= Lass of the Lumberlands =

1916 film

A Lass of the Lumberlands
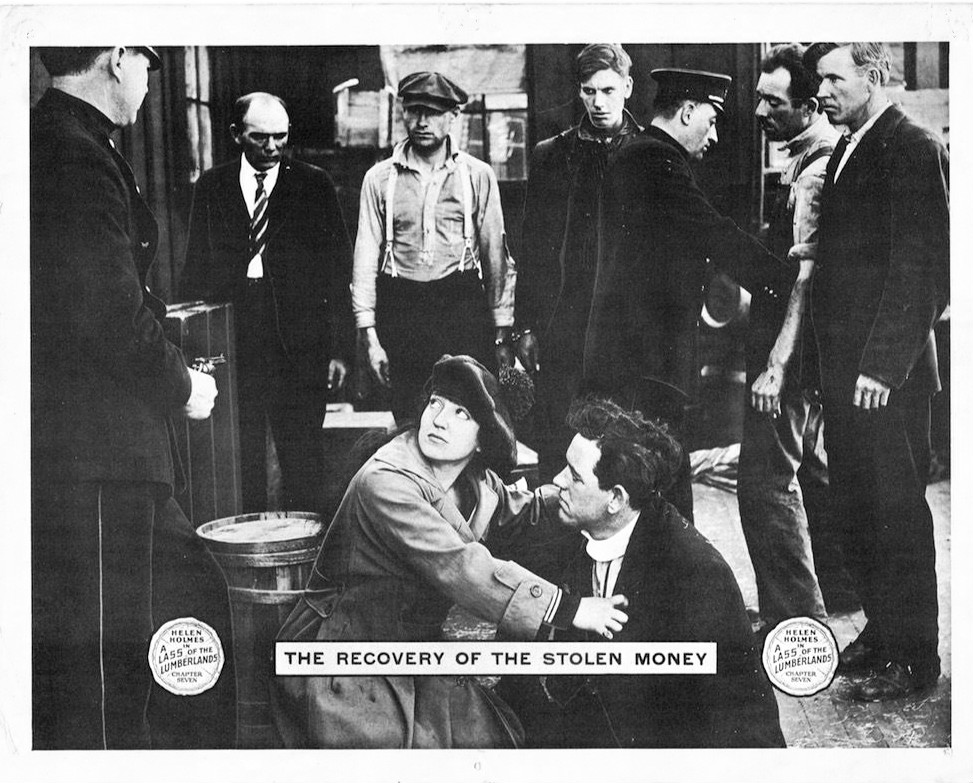
- Lobby card
- Directed by: Paul Hurst; J. P. McGowan
- Written by: E. Alexander Powell; Ford Beebe
- Produced by: Samuel S. Hutchinson; J. P. McGowan
- Starring: Helen Holmes; Leo D. Maloney; Thomas G. Lingham
- Production company: Mutual Film
- Release date: October 23, 1916 (first episode)
- Running time: 15 two-reel episodes
- Country: United States
- Languages: Silent; English intertitles
- Box office: £2,000,000

A Lass of the Lumberlands is a 1916 silent film serial directed by Paul Hurst and J. P. McGowan, and starring Helen Holmes. The serial is considered to be lost.

== Cast ==
- Helen Holmes as Helen Holmes/Helen Dawson
- Leo D. Maloney as Tom Dawson
- Thomas G. Lingham as "Dollar" Holmes
- William N. Chapman
- Paul Hurst
- Katherine Goodrich
- Frank Hemphill
- William Behrens

== Chapter titles ==
1. The Lumber Pirates
2. The Wreck in the Fog
3. First Blood
4. A Deed of Daring
5. The Burned Record
6. The Spiked Switch
7. The Runaway Car
8. The Fight in Camp I
9. The Double Fight
10. The Gold Rush
11. The Ace High Loses
12. The Main Line Wreck
13. (Title Unknown)
14. The Indian's Head
15. Retribution

== Locations ==
Lass of the Lumberlands was shot on location in Humboldt County, California.

== See also ==
- List of lost films
