= Leo Maloney =

Leo Maloney may refer to:

- Leo D. Maloney (1885–1929), American actor and filmmaker
- Leo Maloney (footballer) (born 1937), former Australian rules footballer
