= Hey! Hey! Cowboy =

1927 film

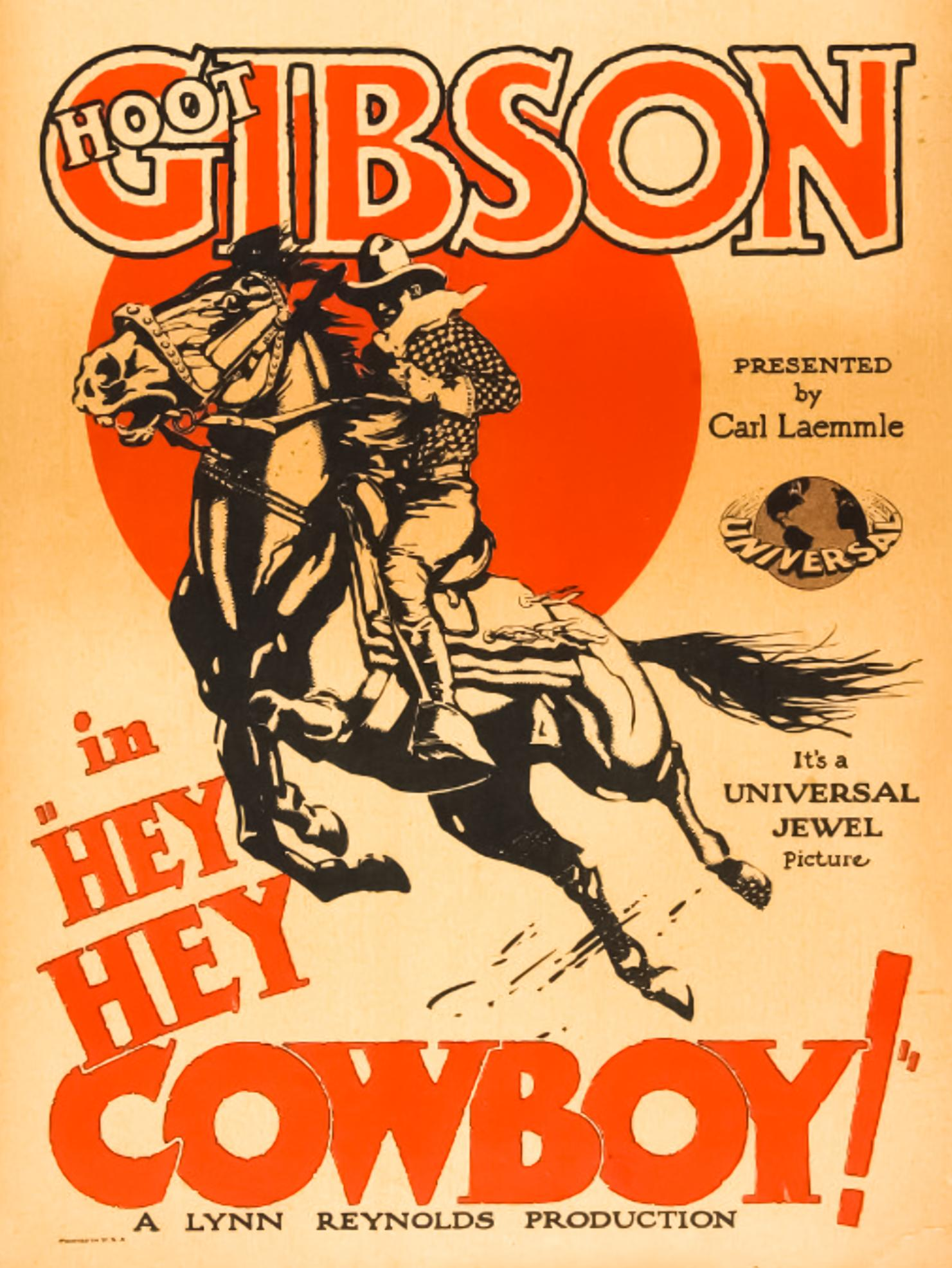
- Directed by: Lynn Reynolds; Edward Laemmle
- Produced by: Carl Laemmle
- Starring: Hoot Gibson
- Cinematography: Harry Neumann
- Distributed by: Universal Pictures
- Release date: April 3, 1927
- Running time: 6 reels
- Country: United States
- Languages: Silent; English intertitles

Hey! Hey! Cowboy is a lost 1927 American silent Western film directed by Lynn Reynolds and Edward Laemmle and starring Hoot Gibson. It was produced and released by Universal Pictures.

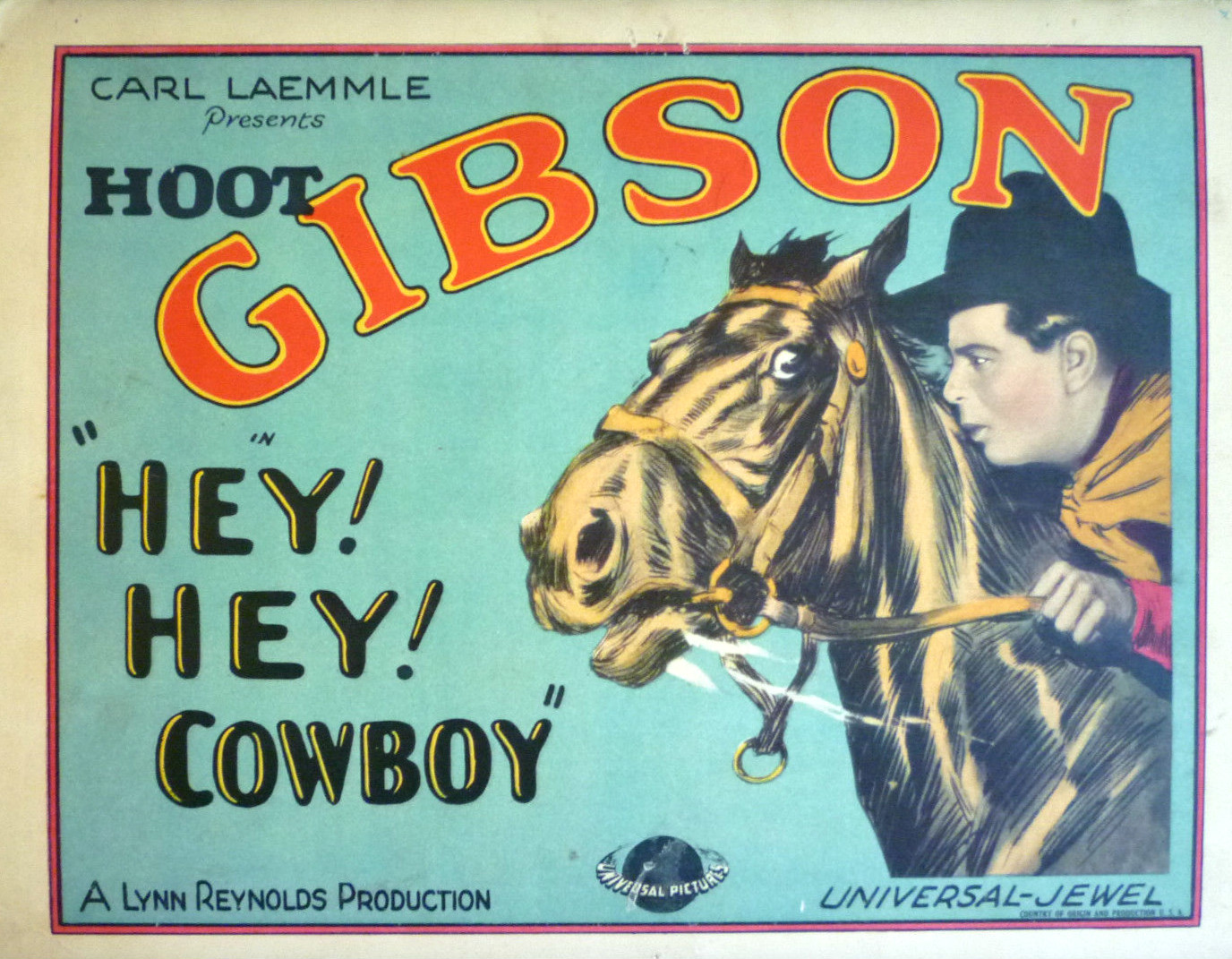
Lobby card

== Cast ==
- Hoot Gibson as Jimmie Roberts
- Nick Cogley as Julius Decker
- Kathleen Key as Emily Decker
- Wheeler Oakman as John Evans
- Clark Comstock as Joe Billings
- Monte Montague as Hank Mander
- Milla Davenport as Aunt Jane
- Jim Corey as Blake
- Slim Summerville as Spike Doolin
