= The Saddle King (1921 film) =

1921 film

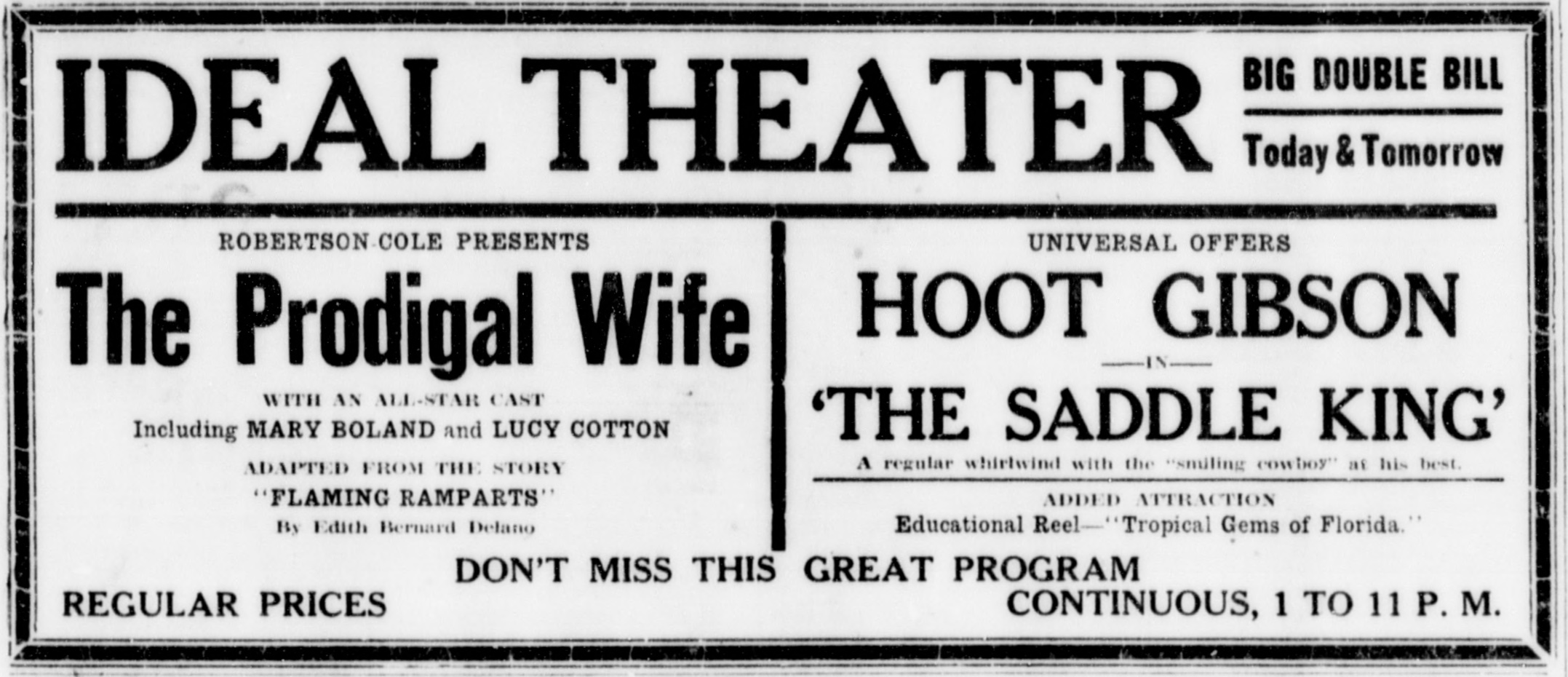
- Contemporary advertisement for the film and for the film The Prodigal Wife
- Directed by: Edward Laemmle
- Written by: Ford Beebe; George Morgan
- Starring: Hoot Gibson
- Release date: January 1, 1921
- Running time: 20 minutes
- Country: United States
- Languages: Silent; English intertitles

The Saddle King is a 1921 American short silent Western film directed by Edward Laemmle and featuring Hoot Gibson.

== Plot ==
This is the plot summary from the studio:

The story is of the usual Western variety and affords the star plenty of opportunity to display his ability as a hard riding, quick thinking cowpuncher of the West.

Gibson is seen in the role of a broken-down cowboy, who applies for work at one of the Western ranches. The boss agrees to hire the wanderer provided he can ride an unmanageable horse. Gibson consents, rides the horse and gets the job. In accomplishing this stunt, he arouses the jealousy of the foreman, for the latter learns that the ranchman's daughter has seen the newcomer subdue the wild animal and is beginning to fall in love with him. To prevent this the villain accuses his rival of many misdeeds, but in the end is a victim of his own folly.

Dorothy Wood and a capable cast support the star.

— Frank Leonard, "The Saddle King", Motion Picture News

== Cast ==
- Hoot Gibson
- Charles Newton
- Dorothy Wood
- Jim Corey
