= The Bronc Stomper =

1928 film

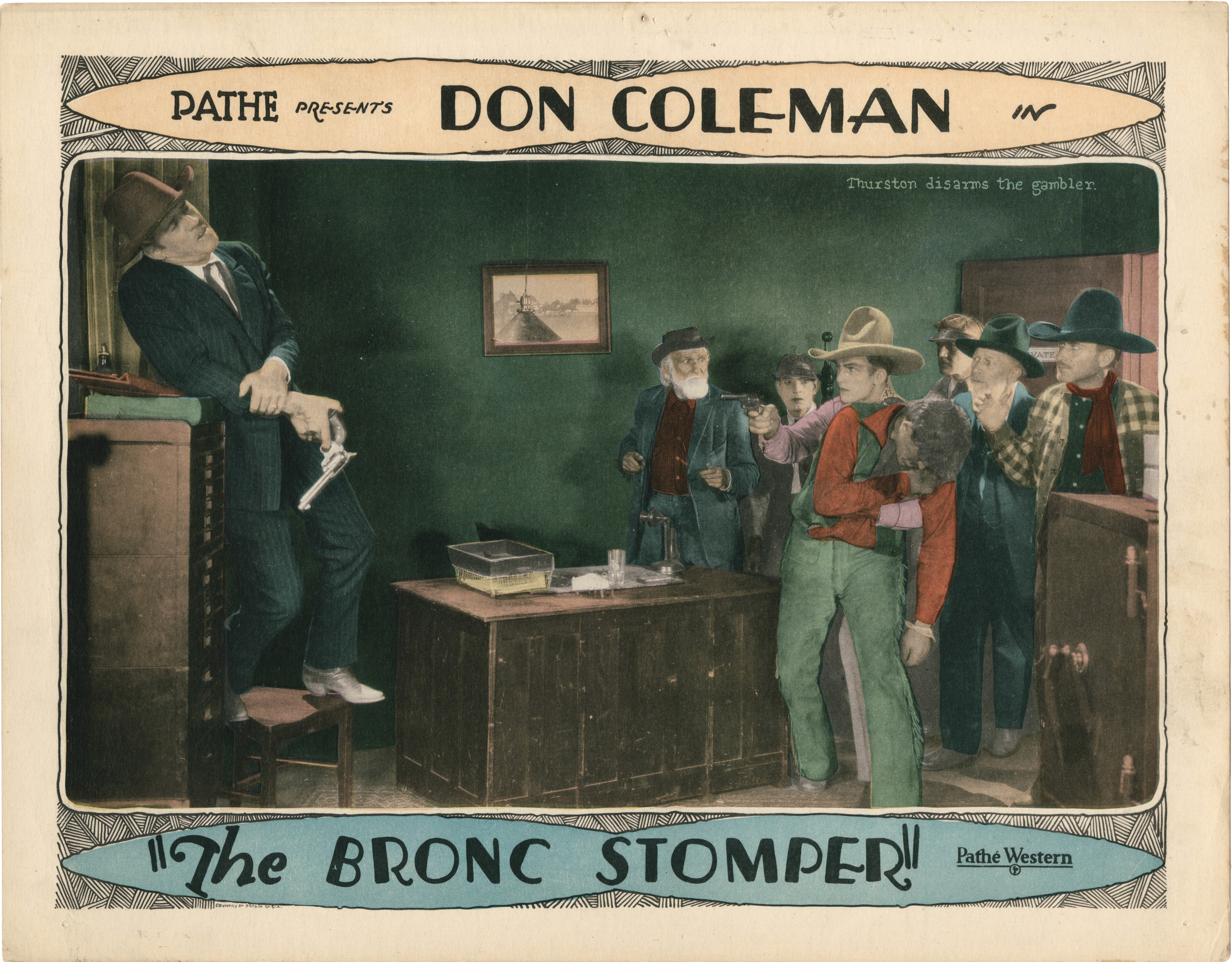
- Directed by: Leo D. Maloney
- Written by: Ford Beebe; Barr Cross
- Produced by: Leo D. Maloney
- Starring: Eugenia Gilbert; Ben Corbett; Tom London
- Cinematography: Edward A. Kull
- Edited by: Joseph Kane
- Production company: Leo Maloney Productions
- Distributed by: Pathé Exchange
- Release date: February 26, 1928
- Running time: 60 minutes
- Country: United States
- Languages: Silent; English intertitles

The Bronc Stomper is a 1928 American silent Western film directed by Leo D. Maloney and starring Eugenia Gilbert, Ben Corbett and Tom London.

== Cast ==
- Eugenia Gilbert as Daisy Hollister
- Don Coleman as Richard Thurston
- Ben Corbett as Yea Bo Smith
- Tom London as Alan Riggs
- Bud Osborne as Slim Garvey
- Frank Clark as James Hollister
- Frederick Dana as R.M. Thompson
- Whitehorse as Town Marshal
- Ray Walters as Deputy Marshal
- Bob Burns as Rodeo Manager
- Florence Lee as Mrs. Hollister

== Preservation ==
With no holdings located in archives, The Bronc Stomper is considered a lost film.
