= The Man from Hard Pan =

1927 film

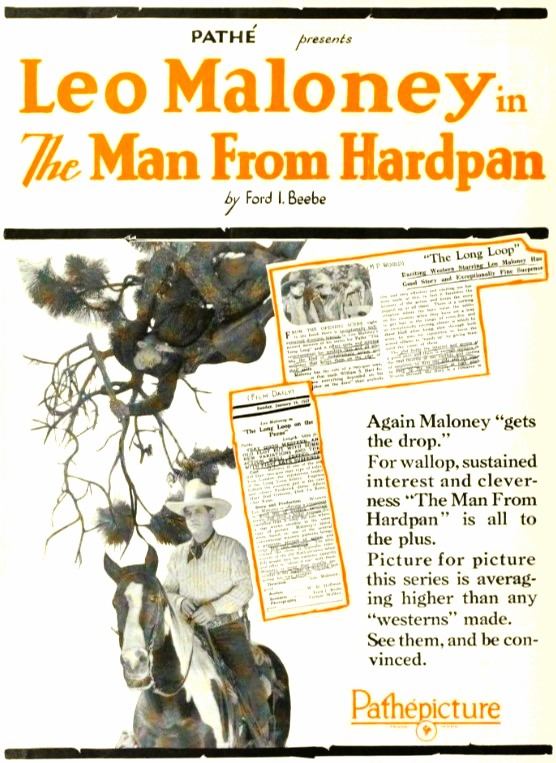
- Advertisement
- Directed by: Leo D. Maloney
- Written by: Ford Beebe
- Starring: Leo D. Maloney; Eugenia Gilbert; Rosa Gore
- Cinematography: Vernon L. Walker
- Production company: Leo Maloney Productions
- Distributed by: Pathe Exchange
- Release date: March 6, 1927
- Running time: 60 minutes
- Country: United States
- Language: Silent (English intertitles)

The Man from Hard Pan is a 1927 American silent Western film directed by Leo D. Maloney and starring Maloney, Eugenia Gilbert, and Rosa Gore.

== Cast ==
- Leo D. Maloney as Robert Alan
- Eugenia Gilbert as Elizabeth Warner
- Rosa Gore as Sarah Lackey
- Murdock MacQuarrie as Henry Hardy
- Paul Hurst as Larry Lackey
- Ben Corbett as Jack Burton
- Al Hart as Sheriff
