= Spook Ranch =

1925 film

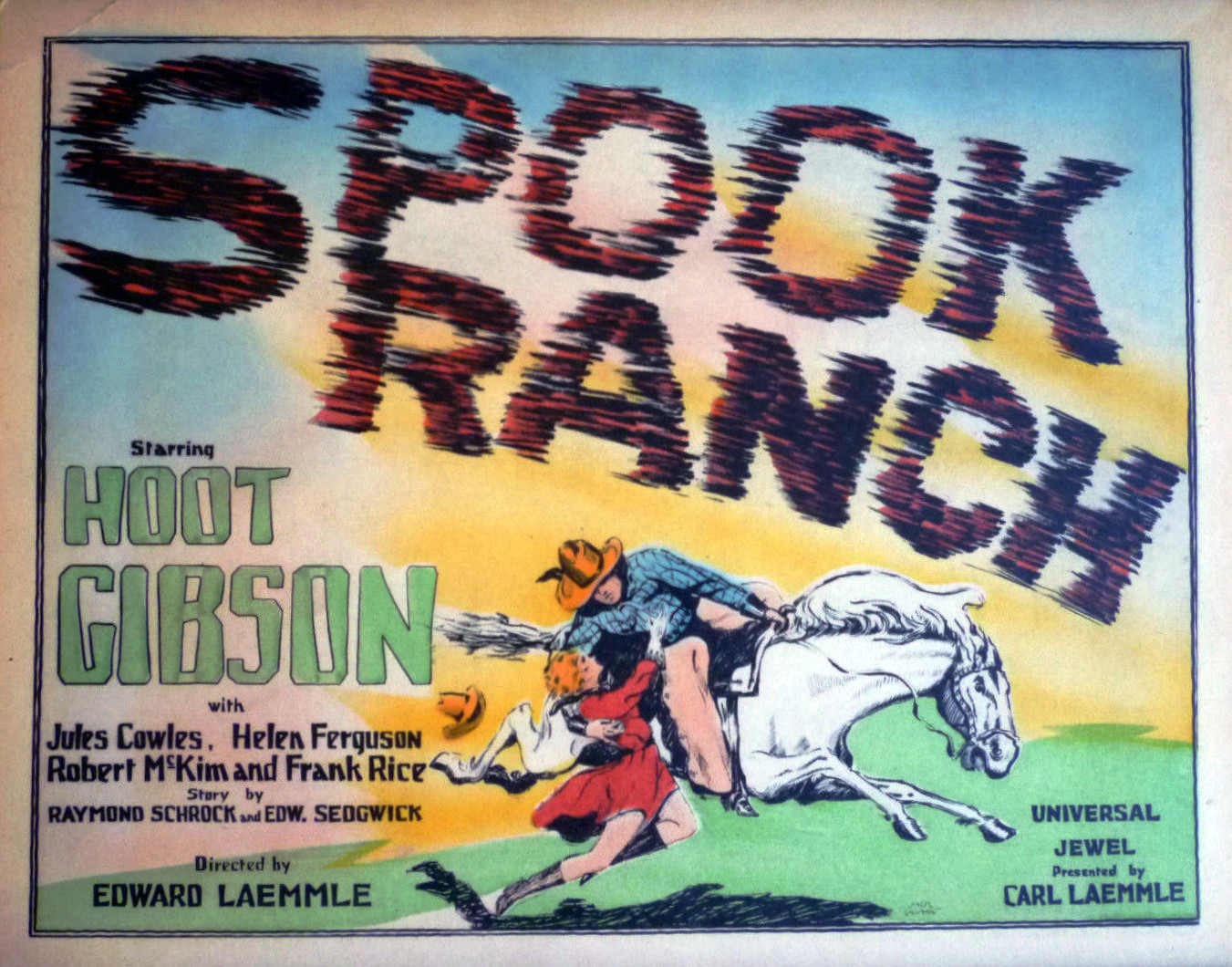
- Lobby card
- Directed by: Edward Laemmle
- Written by: Raymond L. Schrock (story, scenario); Edward Sedgwick (story)
- Produced by: Carl Laemmle
- Starring: Hoot Gibson
- Cinematography: Harry Neumann
- Distributed by: Universal Pictures
- Release date: September 20, 1925
- Running time: 6 reels
- Country: United States
- Languages: Silent; English intertitles

Spook Ranch is a 1925 American silent Western film directed by Edward Laemmle (Carl Laemmle's nephew) and starring Hoot Gibson. It was produced and distributed by Universal Pictures. The film featured white actor Ed Cowles in blackface playing Hoot Gibson's black sidekick, George Washington Black.

Universal Pictures founder Carl Laemmle persuaded his nephew Edward to enter the family business in 1915, after which he specialized mostly in directing westerns. Actress Helen Ferguson retired from acting in 1930 and became a Hollywood publicist. Hoot Gibson enjoyed a sensational career as a major Western star in the 1920s and early 1930s, but wound up dying penniless in 1962, from cancer.

== Plot ==
In a small mining town in the West, the sheriff orders a cowboy named Bill Bangs (Hoot Gibson) and his Negro sidekick to investigate a haunted ranch. They discover that the ranch is not haunted, but rather is inhabited by a gang of criminals who have kidnapped the ranch owner's daughter to ransom her for her father's gold. The cowboy defeats the gang and winds up with the girl.

== Cast ==
- Hoot Gibson as Bill Bangs
- Jules Cowles (credited as Ed Cowles) as George Washington Black
- Tote Du Crow as Navarro
- Helen Ferguson as Elvira
- Robert McKim as Don Ramies, chief villain
- Frank Rice as the Sheriff
- Dick Sutherland (uncredited)

== Preservation status ==
This film is preserved in the Museum of Modern Art and Filmoteca de Catalunya, Barcelona.
