= Border Blackbirds =

1927 film

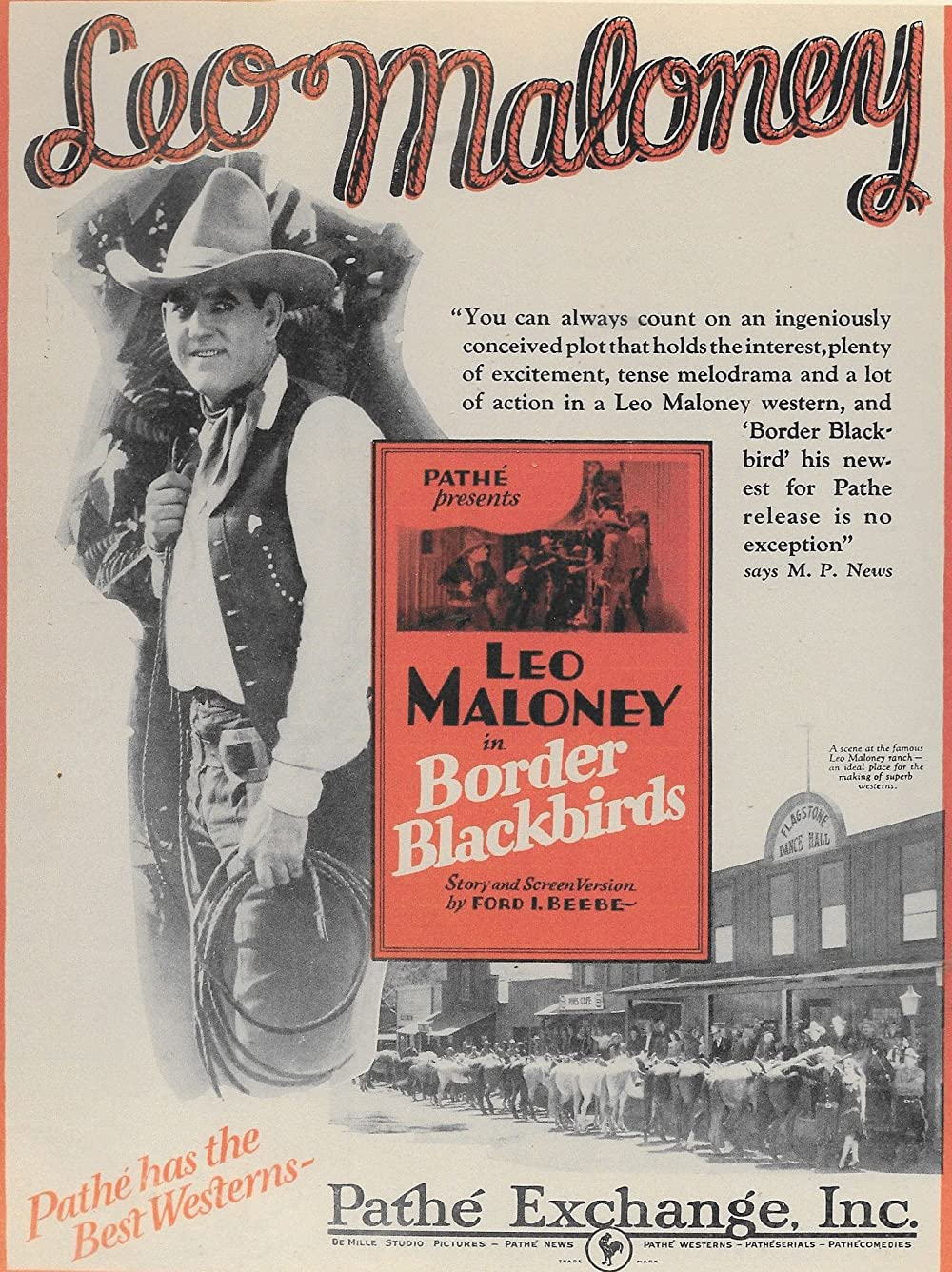
- Directed by: Leo D. Maloney
- Written by: Ford Beebe
- Produced by: Leo D. Maloney
- Starring: Leo D. Maloney; Eugenia Gilbert; Nelson McDowell
- Cinematography: Edward A. Kull
- Production company: Leo Maloney Productions
- Distributed by: Pathé Exchange
- Release date: August 28, 1927
- Running time: 50 minutes
- Country: United States
- Languages: Silent; English intertitles

Border Blackbirds is a 1927 American silent Western film directed by Leo D. Maloney and starring Maloney, Eugenia Gilbert and Nelson McDowell.

== Cast ==
- Leo D. Maloney as Bart Evans
- Eugenia Gilbert as Marion Kingsley
- Nelson McDowell as Mournful Luke
- Joe Rickson as Suderman
- Bud Osborne as McWraight
- Frank Clark
- Morgan Davis
- Tom London
- Don Coleman
- Allen Watt
