= The Oregon Trail (1923 serial) =

1923 film

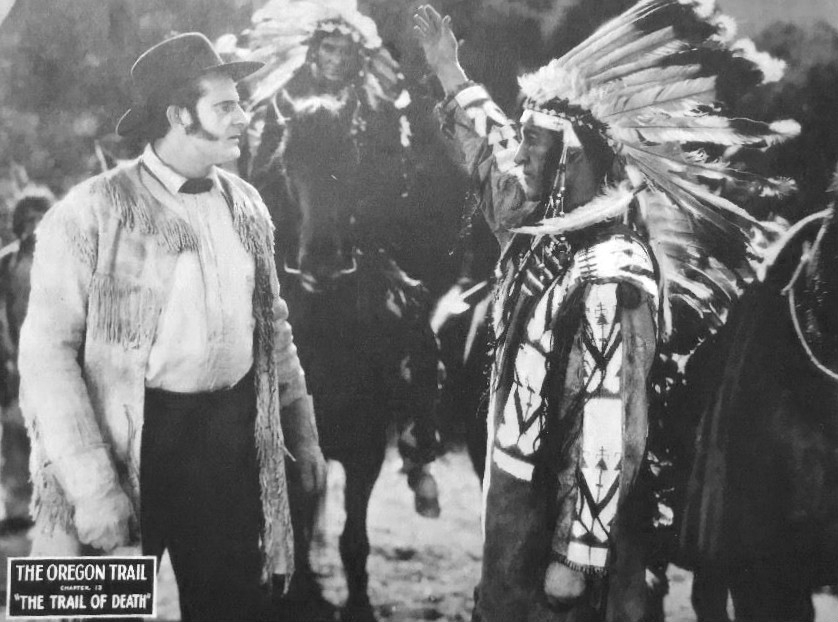
- Lobby card
- Directed by: Edward Laemmle
- Written by: Douglas Bronston; Anthony Coldeway; Robert Dillon; Jefferson Moffitt
- Starring: Art Acord; Louise Lorraine
- Distributed by: Universal Pictures
- Release date: March 12, 1923
- Running time: 18 episodes
- Country: United States
- Languages: Silent; English intertitles

The Oregon Trail is a 1923 American silent Western film serial directed by Edward Laemmle. The film is considered to be lost.

== Cast ==
- Art Acord as Jean Brulet
- Louise Lorraine as Rosita Velázquez
- Duke R. Lee as Dr. Marcus Whitman
- Jim Corey as Rene Coulier
- Burton Law as Rev. Henry Spaulding (as Burton C. Law)
- Sidney De Gray as Hernandez Velázquez
- Ruth Royce as Narcissa Prentiss
- Grace McLean as Mrs. Spaulding
- Dick Carter as Dr. William Gray
- Walter Bytell
- William Ryno (as William H. Ryno)
- Frederick Peters
- Rex the Dog as Jerry (the dog) (as Rex the Wonder Dog)
- Fleetwood the Horse as Fleetwood (Jean's horse)
- Hank Bell as Trapper (uncredited)

== Chapter titles ==
1. Westward Ho!
2. White Treachery
3. Across the Continent
4. Message of Death
5. Wagon of Doom
6. Secret Foes
7. A Man of God
8. Seeds of Civilization
9. Justice
10. The New Era
11. A Game of Nations
12. To Save an Empire
13. Trail of Death
14. On to Washington
15. Santa Fe
16. Fate of a Nation
17. For High Stakes
18. Victory

== See also ==
- List of film serials
- List of film serials by studio
- List of lost films
