= In the Days of Buffalo Bill =

1922 film

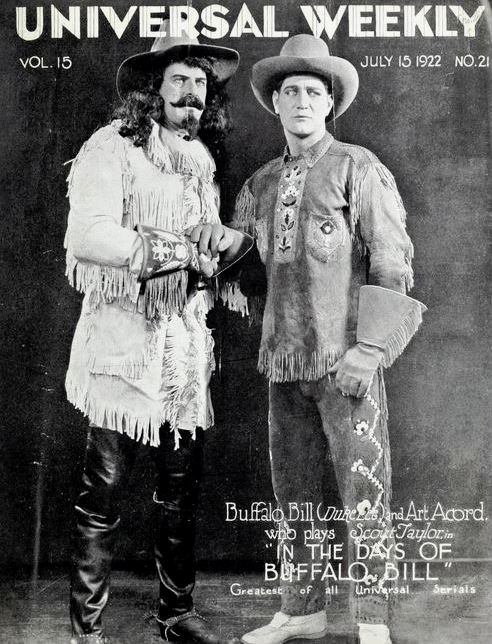
- Cover of Universal Weekly (July 15, 1922)
- Directed by: Edward Laemmle
- Written by: Robert Dillon
- Produced by: Carl Laemmle
- Starring: Art Acord; Duke R. Lee
- Cinematography: Herbert Kirkpatrick; Howard Oswald
- Distributed by: Universal Film Manufacturing Co.
- Release date: September 11, 1922
- Running time: 18 episodes
- Country: United States
- Languages: Silent; English intertitles

In the Days of Buffalo Bill is a 1922 American silent Western film serial directed by Edward Laemmle. The film, which consisted of 18 episodes, is currently classified as lost. A clip of the Golden Spike segment has been found and uploaded to the Internet Archive.

== Production ==
Parts of the film were made at Edgar Rice Burroughs's ranch near Universal City and at Manix, California in the Mojave Desert. The Union Pacific Railroad supplied two antique steam locomotives to represent the Jupiter and Union Pacific 119, as well as three wooden passenger cars. The locomotive which represented Jupiter was a 4-6-0 wheel arrangement, whilst a 4-4-0 played 119.

Citizens from Yermo and as far as Barstow were invited to play as extras for the Golden Spike scene. The UP built a spur track 15 miles east of Yermo to represent Promontory Point. 200 to 300 spectators were reported on the scene that day. A sandstorm disrupted filming, and the cast and crew had to make a mad dash back to Yermo for shelter.

The antique locomotives and cars were stored at the Yermo roundhouse, till a fire destroyed it in March 1922. Both actors and railroad crew worked hastily to rescue the movie train from the roundhouse. Luckily, the engines and cars escaped unscathed. The Union Pacific railroad had them insured for $50,000.

Some production stills from the 1869 episodes have been saved in the Mojave River Valley Museum in Barstow, California since 1975, but were long mistaken as photos of the first train into Barstow in 1883.

== Cast ==
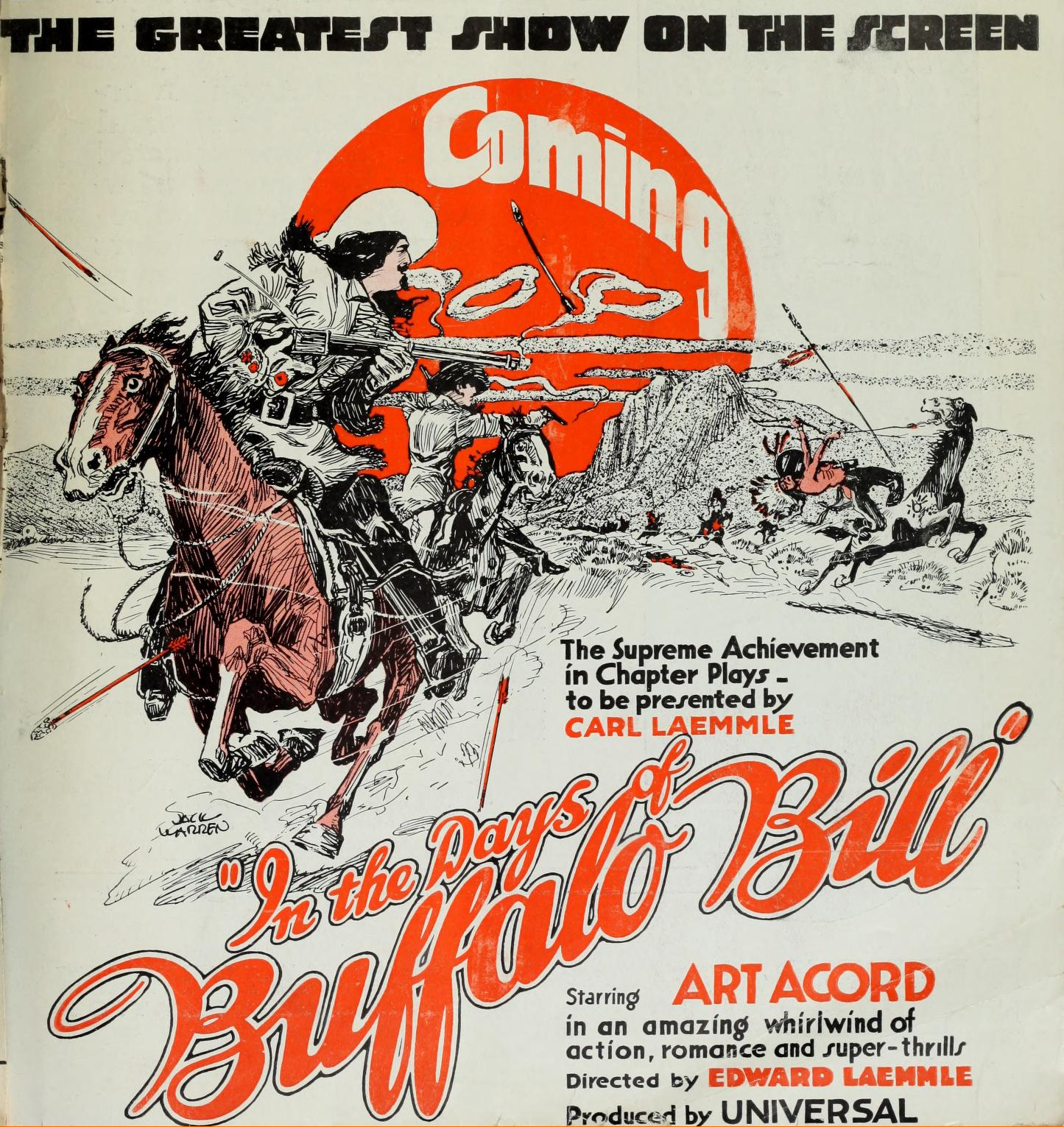
Advertisement in The Film Daily (July 2, 1922)

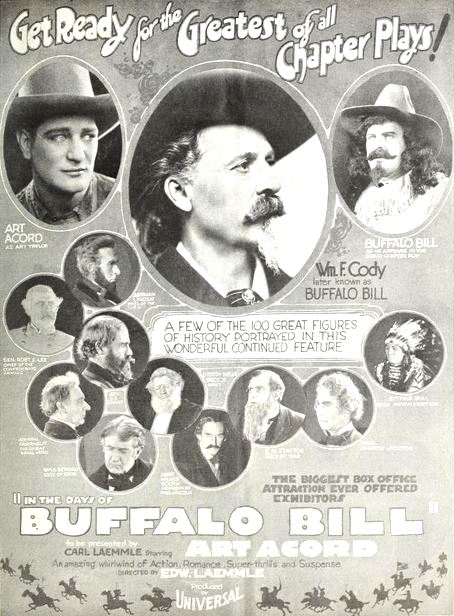
Advertisement in Universal Weekly (June 10, 1922)

- Art Acord as Art Taylor
- Duke R. Lee as Buffalo Bill Cody
- George A. Williams as Calvert Carter
- Jay Morley as Lambert Ashley
- Otto Nelson as Alden Carter
- Pat Harmon as Gaspard
- Jim Corey as Quantrell
- Burton Law as Allen Pinkerton (as Burton C. Law)
- William De Vaull as Edwin M. Stanton (as William P. Devaull)
- Joel Day as Abraham Lincoln (Note: Lincoln and Grant are each played by two actors.)
- J. Herbert Frank as Abraham Lincoln
- Clark Comstock as Thomas C. Durant
- Charles Colby as William H. Seward
- Joseph Hazelton as Gideon Welles (as Joe Hazleton)
- Lafe McKee as Gen. Robert E. Lee (as Lafayette McKee)
- G.B. Philips as Montgomery Blair
- Tex Driscoll as Gen. U.S. Grant (as John W. Morris)
- Harry Myers as Andrew Johnson (as Henry Myers)
- Ruth Royce as Aimee Lenard
- Chief Lightheart as Sitting Bull
- William Knight as Jack Casement
- Elsie Greeson as Louise Frederici
- Buck Connors as Hank Tabor
- Millard K. Wilson as Tim O'Mara (as M.K. Wilson)
- William F. Moran as John Wilkes Booth (as William Moran)
- Silver Tip Baker as Gen. Grenville M. Dodge (as Silvertip Baker)
- Charles Newton as Maj. North
- Alfred Hollingsworth as Chief Justice Chase
- Lester Cuneo
- Marion Feducha as Andrew Johnson as a boy
- Helen Farnum (uncredited)
- Joe Miller (uncredited)
- Dorothy Wood (uncredited)

== Litigation over name "Buffalo Bill" ==
The corporation founded by William F. Cody, the actual Buffalo Bill, and two partners in 1913, which made a film of his wild west exploits, The Adventures of Buffalo Bill (1917), brought a suit in federal court in Colorado seeking an injunction to prevent the 1922 film serial from using the name "Buffalo Bill" and his likeness in any advertising. Applying the law of unfair competition, the court dismissed the suit noting that the name, which at best had only a common law trademark, had acquired a secondary meaning regarding the American West which had lost its exclusivity from being used in several plays without challenge, and that the theater-going public could readily distinguish between the films.

== Chapter titles ==
1. Bonds of Steel
2. In the Enemy's Hands
3. The Spy
4. The Sword of Grant and Lee
5. The Man of the Ages
6. Prisoners of the Sioux
7. Shackles of Fate
8. The Last Shot
9. From Tailor to President
10. Empire Builders
11. Perils of the Plains
12. The Hand of Justice
13. Trails of Peril
14. The Scarlet Doom
15. Men of Steel
16. The Brink of Eternity
17. A Race to the Finish
18. Driving the Golden Spike

== See also ==
- List of film serials
- List of film serials by studio
- List of lost films
