= Blind Trail =

1926 film

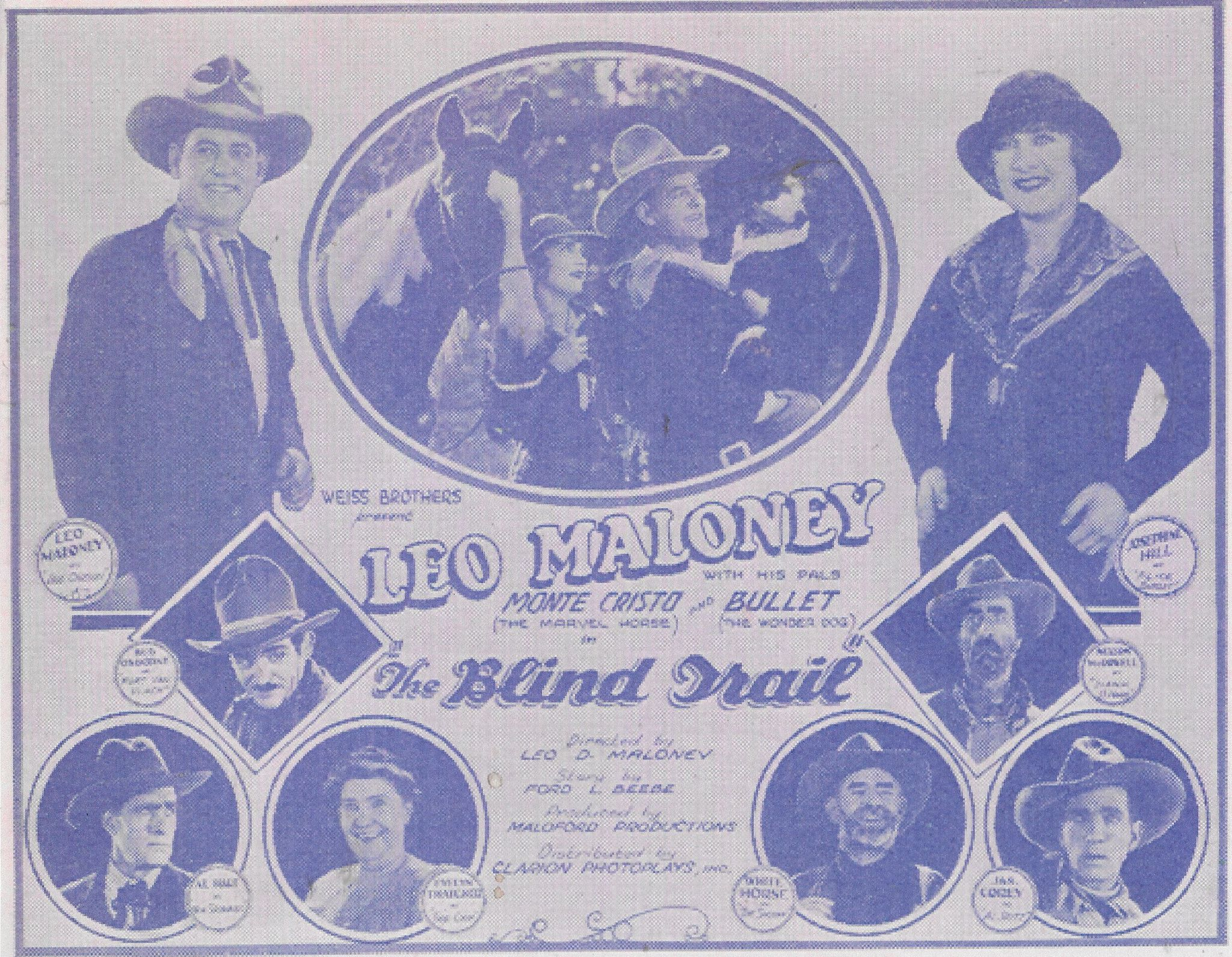
- Directed by: Leo D. Maloney
- Written by: Ford Beebe
- Produced by: Adolph Weiss; Louis Weiss; Max Weiss
- Starring: Leo D. Maloney; Josephine Hill; Nelson McDowell
- Cinematography: Tom Malloy
- Edited by: Joseph Kane
- Production companies: Maloford Productions; Clarion Photoplays
- Distributed by: Weiss Brothers
- Release date: January 15, 1926
- Running time: 53 minutes
- Country: United States
- Languages: Silent; English intertitles

Blind Trail (also The Blind Trail) is a 1926 American silent Western film directed by Leo D. Maloney and starring Maloney, Josephine Hill and Nelson McDowell.

== Plot ==
Bob Carson and his companion Hank O'Hara are journeying through the western frontier when they stop at a local café. A dispute ensues between them and the nefarious individuals Mort Van Vlack and Al Sinclair. Meanwhile, Alice Bartlett, who has recently lost her parents, arrives in town to settle a debt held by moneylender William Skinner against her late father's ranch. Unbeknownst to her, the note is a forgery orchestrated by Skinner and his associates, Mort and Al. A confrontation arises between Skinner and his accomplices over the division of the ill-gotten gains, resulting in Skinner's demise. Carson, investigating the scene, finds himself implicated in the crime when the Sheriff arrives and apprehends him for the murder.

== Cast ==
- Leo D. Maloney as Bob Carson
- Josephine Hill as Alice Bartlett
- Nelson McDowell as Hank O'Hara
- Bud Osborne as Mort Van Vlack
- Jim Corey as Al Leitz
- Al Hart as William Skinner
- Whitehorse as The Sheriff
- Eva Thatcher as The Cook

== Bibliography ==
- Connelly, Robert B. The Silents: Silent Feature Films, 1910-36, Volume 40, Issue 2. December Press, 1998. ISBN 978-0-913204-36-8
- Munden, Kenneth White. The American Film Institute Catalog of Motion Pictures Produced in the United States, Part 1. University of California Press, 1997. ISBN 978-0-520-20970-1
