= Bud Osborne =

American actor (1884–1964)

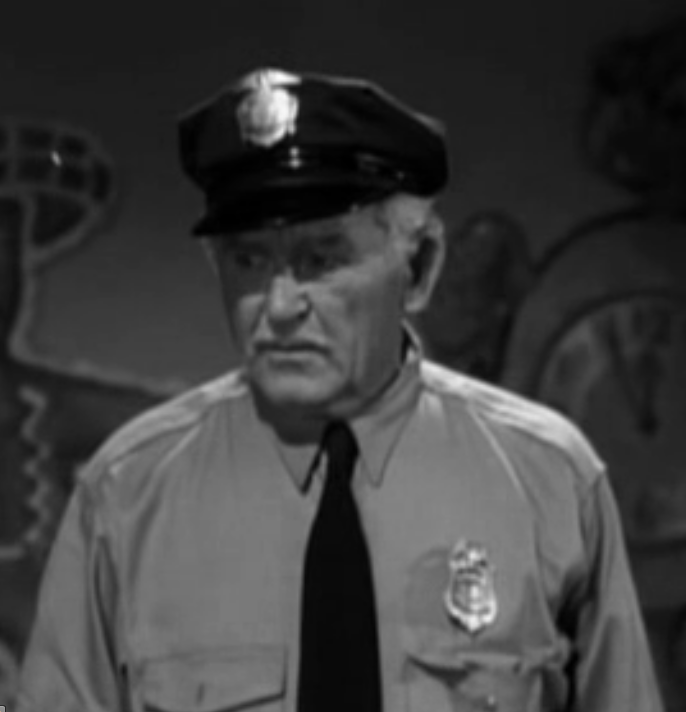
- Osborne in Jail Bait (1954)
- Born: Leonard Miles Osborne; July 20, 1884; Knox County, Texas, U.S.
- Died: February 2, 1964 (aged 79); Hollywood, California, U.S.
- Occupation: Actor
- Years active: 1912–1963

Leonard Miles "Bud" Osborne (July 20, 1884 – February 2, 1964) was an American film actor. He appeared in more than 600 films and television programs between 1912 and 1963.

== Biography ==
Osborne was born Miles Osborne in Knox County, Texas, on February 20, 1884. Osborne attended Oklahoma City schools and was a rancher in Oklahoma's Indian Territory before he became an entertainer. After working with the 101 Ranch Show for five years, he worked with Buffalo Bill's Wild West show for one year in 1912. He became a member of Thomas H. Ince's film company in 1915.

Osborne specialized in westerns, and was also noted for his skill as a stagecoach driver, and was thus much in demand from his first film in 1912 right through the early 1950s. He was working as a stunt man as late as 1948 (at age 64) in Ray Enright's Return of the Bad Men.

Because Bud Osborne worked in westerns almost exclusively, perhaps his most unusual role was that of a big-game hunter in Sam Katzman's 1955 serial The Adventures of Captain Africa. In this low-budget adventure, Osborne was made up and costumed to resemble Frank Buck, to accommodate the use of wild-animal footage from Buck's 1937 serial Jungle Menace. Osborne even appeared in three very-low-budget features directed by exploitation film specialist Ed Wood: Jail Bait (1954), Bride of the Monster (1955), and Night of the Ghouls (filmed in 1959 but not released nationally).

Bud Osborne kept working into his seventies, playing small character parts in such television western series as Have Gun – Will Travel, Bonanza, Bat Masterson, The Life and Legend of Wyatt Earp, Rawhide and The Lone Ranger. His last role was in an episode of Gunsmoke in 1963. His career spanned 51 years, with a total of nearly 700 films and television episodes to his credit.

Osborne died in Hollywood, California at age 79 from a heart attack. He was buried at the Forest Lawn, Hollywood Hills Cemetery in Los Angeles.

== Selected filmography ==
- A Knight of the Range (1916)
- Love's Lariat (1916)
- The Tiger's Trail (1919)
- Vanishing Trails (1920)
- White Eagle (1922)
- Boomerang Justice (1922)
- Barriers of Folly (1922)
- The Prairie Mystery (1922)
- The Ghost City (1923)
- The Way of a Man (1924)
- The Silent Stranger (1924)
- The Knockout Kid (1925)
- The Empty Saddle (1925)
- The Fighting Ranger (1925)
- 3 Bad Men (1926)
- The Outlaw Express (1926)
- The Man from Oklahoma (1926)
- The Blind Trail (1926)
- The Law of the Snow Country (1926)
- Looking for Trouble (1926)
- Cactus Trails (1927)
- Don Desperado (1927)
- Border Blackbirds (1927)
- Rider of the Law (1927)
- The Long Loop on the Pecos (1927)
- Speeding Hoofs (1927)
- King of the Herd (1927)
- The Fighting Stallion (1927)
- The Vanishing Rider (1928)
- The Bronc Stomper (1928)
- Cheyenne Trails (1928)
- The Danger Rider (1928)
- West of Santa Fe (1928)
- On the Divide (1928)
- Yellow Contraband (1928)
- Law of the Mounted (1928)
- The Mystery Rider (1928)
- Texas Tommy (1928)
- The Lariat Kid (1929)
- Bad Men's Money (1929)
- The Cowboy and the Outlaw (1929)
- Wyoming Tornado (1929)
- West of the Rockies (1929)
- The Utah Kid (1930)
- Breed of the West (1930)
- Call of the Desert (1930)
- The Canyon of Missing Men (1930)
- Breezy Bill (1930)
- Call of the West (1930)
- Red Fork Range (1931)
- The Shadow of the Eagle (1932)
- Police Court (1932)
- Texas Cyclone (1932)
- Two-Fisted Law (1932)
- Mark of the Spur (1932)
- Ride Him, Cowboy (1932)
- The Pride of the Legion (1932)
- The Big Stampede (1932)
- Haunted Gold (1932)
- The Telegraph Trail (1933)
- Somewhere in Sonora (1933)
- Circle Canyon (1933)
- The Prescott Kid (1934)
- Western Racketeers (1934)
- Fighting Shadows (1935)
- Riding Wild (1935)
- The Lawless Nineties (1936)
- Ranger Courage (1936)
- The Unknown Ranger (1936)
- The Vigilantes Are Coming (1936)
- Gun Smoke (1936)
- Overland Stage Raiders (1938)
- Santa Fe Stampede (1938)
- Across the Plains (1939)
- The Night Riders (1939)
- New Frontier (1939)
- Frontiers of '49 (1939)
- Allegheny Uprising (1939)
- Lone Star Raiders (1940)
- Pioneer Days (1940)
- West of Pinto Basin (1940)
- Wild Horse Valley (1940)
- Ridin' the Trail (1940)
- Forbidden Trails (1941)
- Underground Rustlers (1941)
- 'Neath Brooklyn Bridge (1942)
- Haunted Ranch (1943)
- Cowboy Commandos (1943)
- Arizona Whirlwind (1944)
- Black Arrow (1944)
- Dead or Alive (1944)
- Law Men (1944)
- The Utah Kid (1944)
- Valley of Vengeance (1944)
- Harmony Trail (1944)
- His Brother's Ghost (1945)
- Fighting Bill Carson (1945)
- Prairie Rustlers (1945)
- Overland Riders (1946)
- Wild West (1946)
- Outlaws of the Plains (1946)
- Trailing Danger (1947)
- West of Dodge City (1947)
- Courtin' Trouble (1948)
- Outlaw Brand (1948)
- Gun Runner (1949)
- Across the Rio Grande (1949)
- Haunted Trails (1949)
- Law of the West (1949)
- Son of Geronimo (1952)
- Jail Bait (1954)
- The Adventures of Captain Africa (1955)
- Bride of the Monster (1956)
- The Rifleman (1958), The Hangman
- Night of the Ghouls (1959)
