= Yellow Contraband =

1928 film by Leo D. Maloney

- Directed by: Leo D. Maloney
- Written by: Ford Beebe
- Produced by: Leo D. Maloney
- Starring: Leo D. Maloney; Eileen Sedgwick; Noble Johnson
- Cinematography: Edward A. Kull
- Edited by: Joseph Kane
- Production company: Leo Maloney Productions
- Distributed by: Pathé Exchange
- Release date: October 28, 1928
- Running time: 60 minutes
- Country: United States
- Languages: Silent; English intertitles

Yellow Contraband is a 1928 American silent thriller film directed by Leo D. Maloney and starring Maloney, Eileen Sedgwick and Noble Johnson.

== Cast ==
- Leo D. Maloney as Leo McMahon / Blackie Harris
- Eileen Sedgwick as Mazie
- Noble Johnson as Li Wong Foo
- Tom London as Drag Conners
- Joe Rickson as Pierre Dufresne
- Bob Burns as Sheriff
- Vester Pegg as Dude McClain
- Walter Patterson as Ice-house Joe
- Bill Patton as Rawhide
- Bud Osborne as Dope Runner
- Frank Ellis as Dope Runner
- Tom B. Forman as Dope Runner

== Bibliography ==
- Munden, Kenneth White. The American Film Institute Catalog of Motion Pictures Produced in the United States, Part 1. University of California Press, 1997.
