= Shipwrecked Among Cannibals =

1920 film

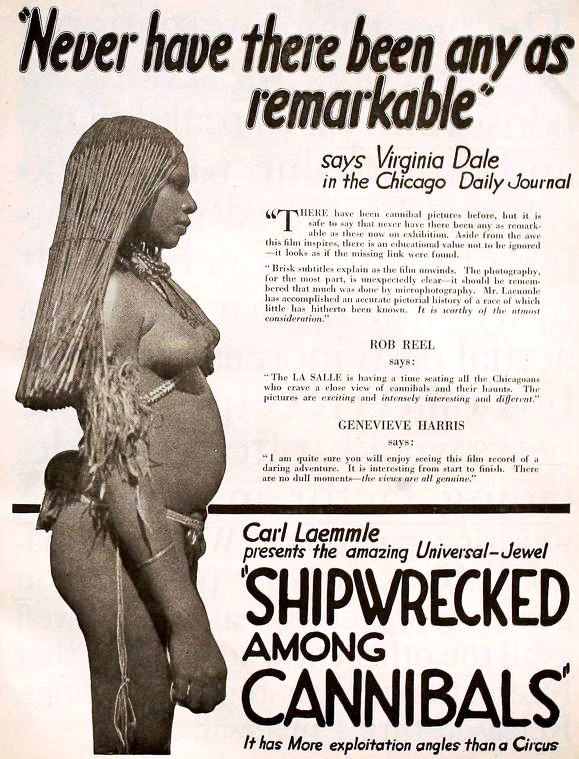
- Advertisement for the film
- Directed by: William F. Adler
- Cinematography: Edward Laemmle and William F. Alder
- Distributed by: Universal Film Manufacturing Company
- Release date: July 4, 1920
- Running time: 6 reels
- Country: United States
- Language: Silent (English intertitles)
- Box office: $1,000,000

Shipwrecked Among Cannibals is a 1920 American silent travel documentary film directed by William F. Alder, and released by Universal Studios in July 1920.

== Production background ==
The film featured episodes from Siam, Java, and New Guinea plus an apparently fictitious encounter with cannibals on a small island in the South Pacific. Filming among the tribes in Dutch New Guinea was done by William F. Alder and Edward Laemmle, who was the nephew of Carl Laemmle, founder of Universal Studios.

== Reception ==
Under the pretense of being an educational ethnographic film, film producers have often justified exploitative elements such as half-clad natives in South Seas island documentaries. At least one educational publication, which appeared to take the film as fully authentic, suggested that this film could with review be used in schools. Although Shipwrecked Among Cannibals generally received good reviews, it did not do well at the box office; however, other accounts say the film was a financial success.

== Preservation status ==
With no listing in any film archives, Shipwrecked Among Cannibals is a lost film.

== See also ==
- Nudity in film
