= The Long Loop on the Pecos =

1927 film

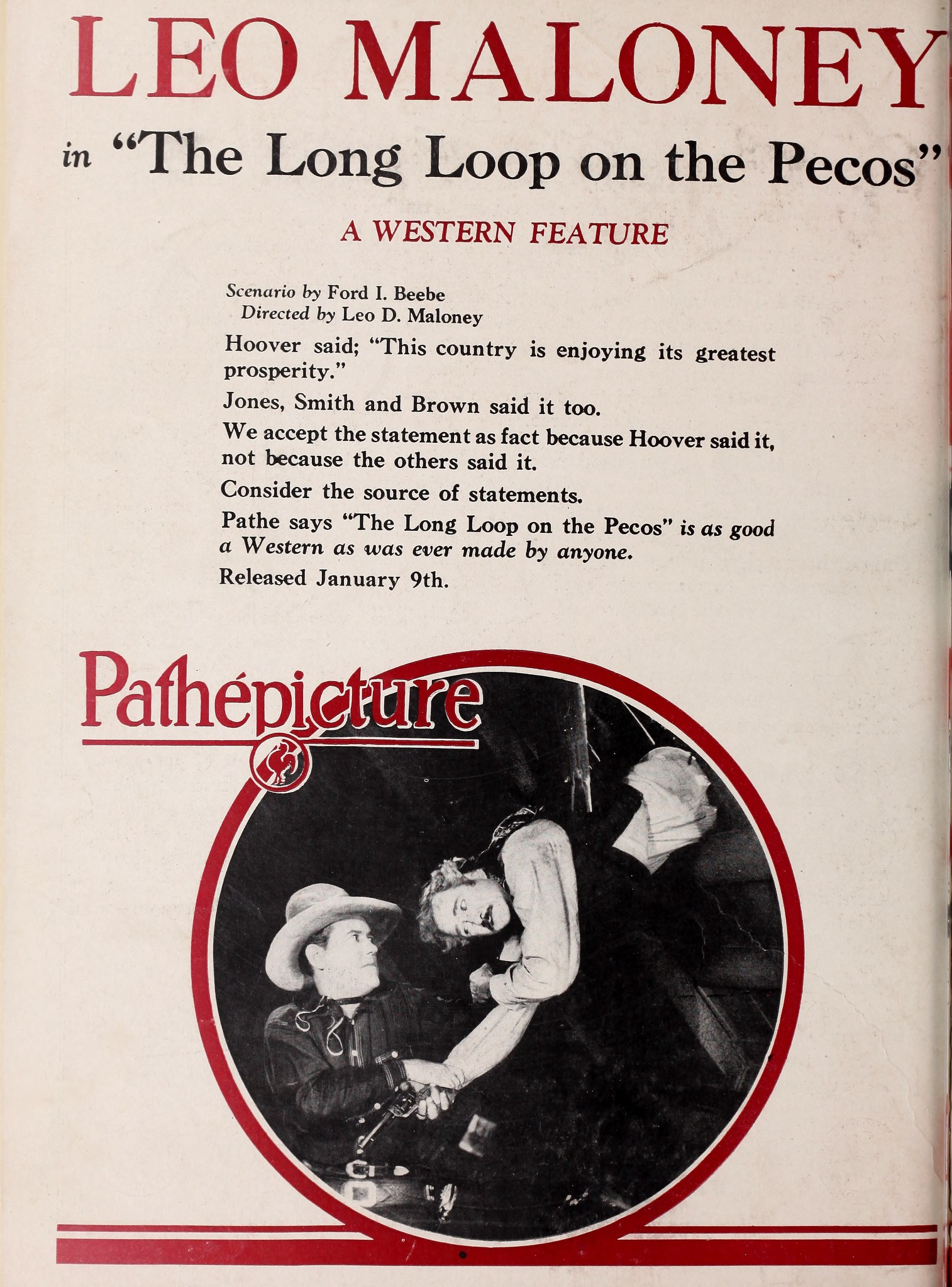
- Advertisement with Maloney and Dana
- Directed by: Leo D. Maloney
- Written by: Ford Beebe; William Dawson Hoffman
- Produced by: Leo D. Maloney
- Starring: Leo D. Maloney; Eugenia Gilbert; Frederick Dana
- Cinematography: Vernon L. Walker
- Production company: Leo Maloney Productions
- Distributed by: Pathe Exchange
- Release date: January 9, 1927
- Running time: 60 minutes
- Country: United States
- Language: Silent (English intertitles)

The Long Loop on the Pecos is a 1927 American silent Western film directed by Leo D. Maloney and starring Maloney, Eugenia Gilbert, and Frederick Dana.

== Cast ==
- Leo D. Maloney as Jim Rutledge
- Eugenia Gilbert as Rose Arnold
- Frederick Dana as Arnold
- Al Hart as Vining
- Tom London as Laird
- Bud Osborne
- Chet Ryan
- Merrill McCormick
- Bob Burns
- Dick La Reno
- Murdock MacQuarrie

== Preservation ==
With no prints of The Long Loop On The Pecos located in any film archives, it is a lost film.
