= Ford Beebe =

American screenwriter, film director (1888–1978)

- Born: November 26, 1888; Grand Rapids, Michigan, United States
- Died: November 26, 1978 (aged 90); Lake Elsinore, California, United States
- Other names: Ford I. Beebe; Ford L. Beebe
- Occupations: Screenwriter; Film director
- Years active: 1916–1977

Ford Ingalsbe Beebe (November 26, 1888 – November 26, 1978) was a screenwriter and director. He entered the film business as a writer around 1916 and over the next 60 years wrote and/or directed almost 200 films.

He specialized in B-movies – mostly Westerns – and action serials, working on the Buck Rogers and Flash Gordon serials for Universal Pictures.

== Life ==
Ford Beebe was born on November 26, 1888, in Grand Rapids, Michigan. Before moving to Hollywood he was a freelance writer who was also experienced in advertising. He arrived in Hollywood in 1916 and began working as a writer for Western films. His first credit was as scenario writer for the 1916 film A Youth of Fortune. Beebe directed for the first time when Leo D. Maloney, who had been directing a film called The Test, fell ill. Beebe became known as a director of low-budget films and serials. He was once described as being "an expert at making something out of nothing." The first serial directed by Beebe was 1932's The Shadow of the Eagle. He went on to direct several other serials, notably Flash Gordon's Trip to Mars, Buck Rogers, The Green Hornet, and Don Winslow of the Navy; these were noted by film historian Hal Erickson to be the best of Beebe's works.

Beebe preferred to direct westerns; speaking to the Evening Independent, he said that westerns were the "bread and butter" of film studios. One western has become a historical landmark: Overland Bound (1929), written by Ford Beebe, was the very first "all-talking" western.

While he was primarily an action specialist, Ford Beebe was a good all-around director capable of handling various genres. Walt Disney hired Beebe to film the live-action reference footage for the "Pastorale" sequence in Fantasia (1940). Beebe's work on Universal's 1942 thriller Night Monster was praised by Alfred Hitchcock, who was impressed with the speed and economy of the production. When singing star Gloria Jean's movie contract was due to expire within one month, Universal needed a musical feature quickly, and assigned Ford Beebe to direct Easy to Look At (1945). Monogram Pictures launched a string of juvenile jungle adventures in 1949; Ford Beebe directed all 12 entries in the Bomba, the Jungle Boy series and scripted 10 of them himself.

== Personal life ==
Beebe was married to writer Frances Wiley. The couple had eight children. Their only son, Ford Beebe, Jr., became a director like his father. They lost twin daughters in infancy and had five daughters who survived it: Frances, Mary, Ruthann, Maxine, and Martha. In Beebe's later life he was married to Kitty Delevanti, with whom he had one son, Mike.

== Selected filmography ==
- The Big Catch (1920)
- A Gamblin' Fool (1920)
- The Grinning Granger (1920)
- One Law for All (1920)
- 'In Wrong' Wright (1920)
- Double Danger (1920)
- The Two-Fisted Lover (1920)
- Tipped Off (1920)
- Superstition (1920)
- Fight It Out (1920)
- The Trail of the Hound (1920)
- The Saddle King (1921)
- The Driftin' Kid (1921)
- Sweet Revenge (1921)
- Kickaroo (1921)
- The White Horseman (1921)
- Winners of the West (1921)
- Too Much Business (1922)
- Battling Bunyan (1924)
- The Business of Love (1925)
- The Outlaw Express (1926)
- The Blind Trail (1926)
- The High Hand (1926)
- Don Desperado (1927)
- The Long Loop on the Pecos (1927)
- Border Blackbirds (1927)
- The Black Ace (1928)
- The Apache Raider (1928)
- The Boss of Rustler's Roost (1928)
- The Bronc Stomper (1928)
- The Code of the Scarlet (1928)
- Yellow Contraband (1928)
- .45 Calibre War (1929)
- Overland Bound (1929)
- The Man from Hard Pan (1927)
- The Vanishing Legion (1931, serial)
- The Pride of the Legion (1932)
- The Prescott Kid (1934)
- The Adventures of Rex and Rinty (1935, serial)
- The Man from Guntown (1935)
- Fighting Shadows (1935)
- Justice of the Range (1935)
- The Revenge Rider (1935)
- Riding Wild (1935)
- Stampede (1936)
- Code of the Range (1936)
- West Bound Limited (1937)
- Jungle Jim (1937, serial)
- Flash Gordon's Trip to Mars (1938, serial)
- Buck Rogers (1938, serial)
- The Phantom Creeps (1939, serial)
- The Stranger from Texas (1939)
- Oklahoma Frontier (1939)
- Flash Gordon Conquers the Universe (1940, serial)
- The Green Hornet (1940, serial)
- Night Monster (1942)
- Enter Arsène Lupin (1944)
- The Invisible Man's Revenge (1944)
- Wagons West (1952)
- Bomba, the Jungle Boy (entire series, 1949-1955)
