= The Grinning Granger =

1920 American short silent Western film

- Directed by: Leo D. Maloney
- Written by: Ford Beebe
- Starring: Hoot Gibson
- Distributed by: Universal Film Manufacturing Company
- Release date: October 9, 1920
- Running time: 20 minutes
- Country: United States
- Languages: Silent; English intertitles

The Grinning Granger is a 1920 American short silent Western film directed and produced by Leo D. Maloney and featuring Hoot Gibson.

== Plot ==
This plot summary is taken from the film's original copyright application at the Library of Congress:

"Grinning" Granger, a wandering cowpuncher, incurs the enmity of "Boney" Simons by whipping him for beating a horse. He further antagonizes him by interfering when Simons attempts to force his unwelcome attention upon Ruth Ransom whose brother, Ned, owns the Lazy-A outfit.

Simons rides to town in a rage and there meets Ned whom he duns for a settlement of a gambling debt. An argument starts which ends in a fight. Granger rides into town and at a distance sees Simons attempting to draw a gun on Ransom who is unarmed. Granger runs to the latter's help but gets there too late. Simons shoots the boy, drops the gun beside him and makes a getaway.

The sheriff hears the shot and hurries to the scene where he finds Granger bending over the body with Simon's gun — still smoking — in his hand. He promptly arrests him for the crime.

Simons, elated at the thought of his enemy being in jail for his crime, goes to the window to make fun of him and tells him that there is now no one to prevent him from having his way with Ruth. Granger realizes the need for immediate action and setting his bed afire starts to yell for help. When the sheriff enters with water, Granger by a clever trick escapes and leaves the sheriff locked inside.

He rides to the ranch, arriving in time to prevent Simons from having his way with Ruth and a fight starts. Simons gets the better of it and throws Granger across the room. As he does so, Granger has hold of his shirt and he takes with him a big pearl button clutched in his hand.

The sheriff arrives in time to keep Simons from killing Granger, and Granger, realizing possibilities in the button he has in his hand tries a ruse to make Simons admit the shooting. He pretends to draw the button from his pocket and tells the sheriff that he found it in Ransom's hand right after the shooting and ends by saying — "And I think it belongs here!"

As he ends, he suddenly jumps forward and fits the button to its place on Simon's shirt. Simons falls for the bluff and admits his guilt but he has the gang covered and starts to back away. He opens the door and backs into the arms of two deputies who are waiting outside.

As he turns to leave the sheriff tells Ruth "Yore brother is still unconscious, but the doc says he'll pull through." Ruth and Granger are happy in the thought that no misery will cloud their new-found love.

— Ford Beebe, story and scenario

== Cast ==
- Hoot Gibson as "Grinning" Granger
- Dorothy Wood as Ruth Ransom
- Kansas Moehring as Ned Ransom
- Jim Corey as "Boney" Simons
- Harry Jackson as the Sheriff

== See also ==
- Hoot Gibson filmography
