= His Auto's Maiden Trip =

- Directed by: Dell Henderson
- Written by: Elmer Booth (story)
- Produced by: Biograph Company
- Starring: Edward Dillon
- Distributed by: General Film Company
- Release date: November 7, 1912
- Running time: short
- Country: USA
- Language: Silent..English titles

His Auto's Maiden Trip is a 1912 silent short film directed by Dell Henderson and produced by the Biograph Company. It was distributed through the General Film Company. It was shown in split-reel form with The Club-Man and the Crook (1912).

== Cast ==
- Edward Dillon - Mr. Jinx
- Florence Lee - Mrs. Jinx
- Charles Murray - A Tramp
- John T. Dillon - A Policeman
- Florence Auer
