= Overland Bound =

1929 film

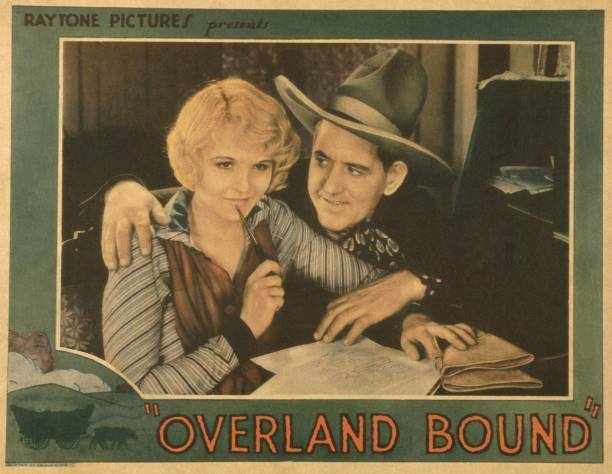
- Theatrical release poster
- Directed by: Leo D. Maloney
- Written by: Ford Beebe
- Produced by: Ralph M. Like; Leo D. Maloney; Harry W. Ramsey; W. Ray Johnston
- Starring: Leo D. Maloney; Allene Ray; Jack Perrin; Lydia Knott
- Cinematography: Walter Haas; William Nobles
- Edited by: Fred Bain
- Production company: Presidio Pictures
- Distributed by: Rayart Pictures
- Release date: November 23, 1929
- Running time: 58 minutes
- Country: United States
- Language: English sound film

Overland Bound is a 1929 American Western film directed by Leo D. Maloney and starring Maloney, Allene Ray, Jack Perrin and Lydia Knott. It is considered to be the first all-talking B Western to be made, following on from the success of the hit 1928 Fox Western In Old Arizona. Despite the drawback of the film's poor sound recording quality, it was successfully distributed. It was Maloney's final film as he died from a stroke shortly after its release.

== Synopsis ==
A man tries to trick a mother and her daughter into selling their ranch, a potentially lucrative property on the site of a future railroad. He hires a man to pose as the mother's long-lost son.

== Cast ==
- Leo D. Maloney as Lucky Lorimer
- Allene Ray as Mary Winters
- Jack Perrin as Larry Withers / Jimmy Winters
- Lydia Knott as Ma Winters
- Hal Taliaferro as Buck Hawkins
- Charles K. French as Underwood
- Albert J. Smith as Keno Creager
- William Dyer as Boss Wheeler
- Starlight the Horse as Starlight
- Bullet the Dog as Bullet

== See also ==
- List of early sound feature films (1926–1929)

== Bibliography ==
- Tuska, Jon. The Vanishing Legion: A History of Mascot Pictures, 1927-1935. McFarland, 1999.
