= The Apache Raider =

1928 film

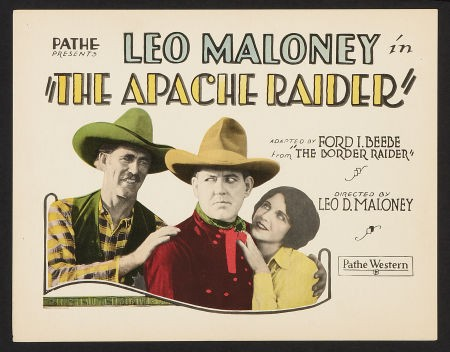
- Directed by: Leo D. Maloney
- Written by: Ford Beebe; William Dawson Hoffman
- Produced by: Leo D. Maloney
- Starring: Leo D. Maloney; Eugenia Gilbert; Tom London
- Cinematography: Edward A. Kull
- Production company: Leo Maloney Productions
- Distributed by: Pathé Exchange
- Release date: February 12, 1928
- Country: United States
- Languages: Silent; English intertitles

The Apache Raider is a 1928 American silent Western film directed by Leo D. Maloney and starring Maloney, Eugenia Gilbert and Tom London.

== Cast ==
- Leo D. Maloney as 'Apache' Bob
- Eugenia Gilbert as Dixie Stillwell
- Don Coleman as Dal Cartwright
- Tom London as Griffin Dawson
- Jack Ganzhorn as 'Breed' Artwell
- Frederick Dana as 'Bit' Ward
- Joan Renee as Juanita Wharton
- Merrill McCormick as Ray Wharton
- Robert Smith as 'Beaze' La Mare
- Walter Shumway as 'Fang' Jaccard
- Murdock MacQuarrie as Don Felix Beinal
- Whitehorse as Ed Stillwell

== Preservation ==
With no holdings located in archives, The Apache Raider is considered a lost film.
