= The Man in Blue (1925 film) =

1925 film by Edward Laemmle

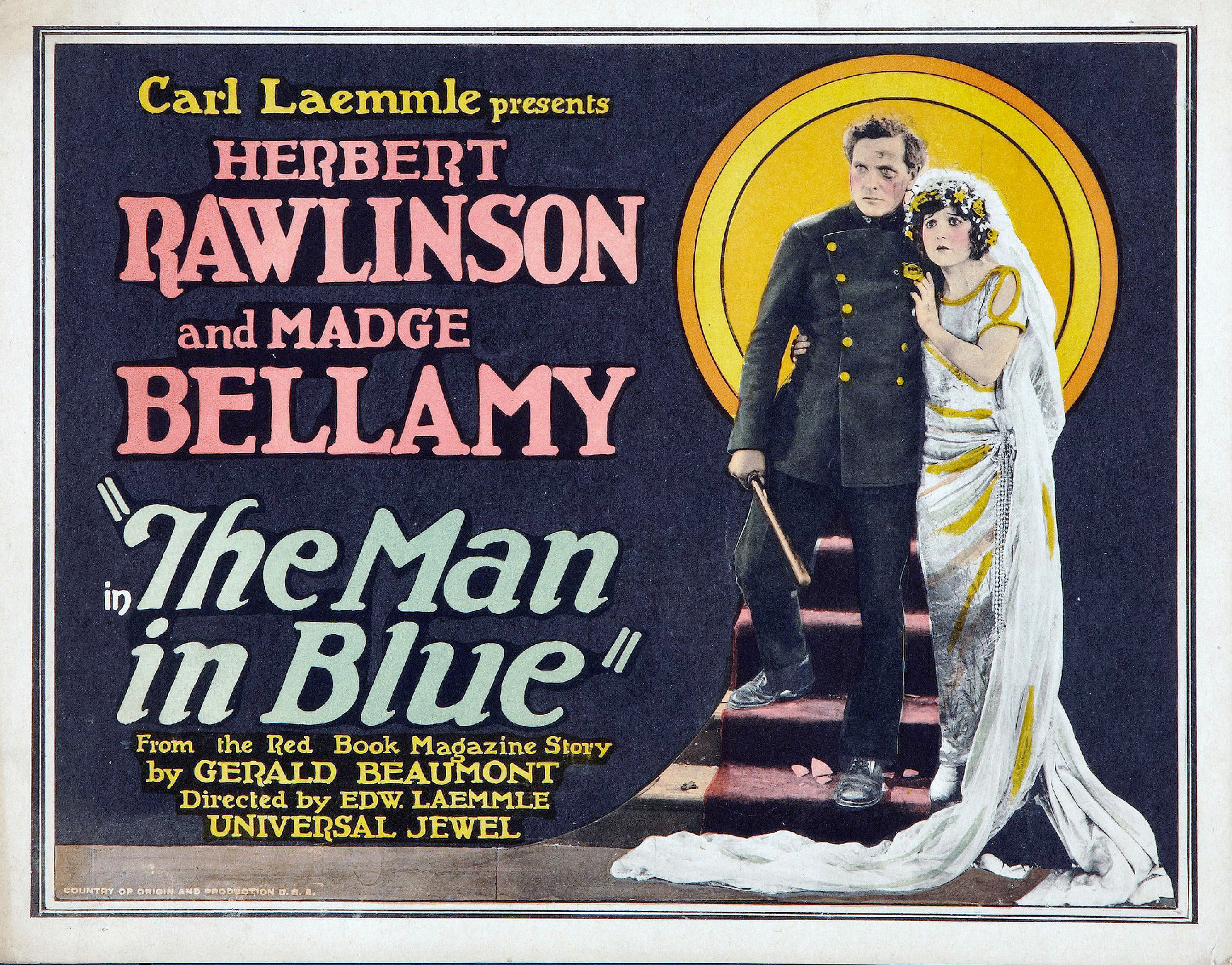
- Lobby card
- Directed by: Edward Laemmle
- Written by: E. Richard Schayer
- Based on: "The Flower of Napoli" by Gerald Beaumont
- Produced by: Carl Laemmle
- Starring: Herbert Rawlinson
- Cinematography: Clyde De Vinna
- Distributed by: Universal Pictures
- Release date: June 21, 1925
- Running time: 6 reels
- Country: United States
- Language: Silent (English intertitles)

The Man in Blue is a 1925 American silent drama film directed by Edward Laemmle and starring Herbert Rawlinson. The film is based upon "The Flower of Napoli" by Gerald Beaumont, a short story first published in the March 1924 issue of Red Book. It was produced and distributed by Universal Pictures.

== Plot ==
As described in a film magazine review, Police Officer Tom Conlin on his beat in New York City's Italian quarter meets and falls in love with a florist's daughter, Tita Sartori. Because he is rearing two children, Tita thinks that he is married. She is being wooed by Italian-American politician Carlo Guido, who is wealthy. The politician kidnaps Tita and keeps her at his apartment. Tom rescues her and tells her that he is single, and she admits that she loves him.

== Cast ==
- Herbert Rawlinson as Tom Conlin
- Madge Bellamy as Tita Sartori
- Nick De Ruiz as Gregoria Vitti
- Andre de Beranger as Carlo Guido
- Cesare Gravina as Tony Sartori
- Jackie Morgan as Pat Malone
- Dorothy Brock as Morna Malone
- D. J. Mitsoras as Cesare Martinelli
- Carrie Clark Ward as Mrs. Shaughnessy
- C. F. Roark as Mr. Shaughnessy
- Martha Mattox as Bendetta
- Harry Mann as Capt. Vittorio Valento

== Preservation ==
The Man in Blue is preserved in the UCLA Film & Television Archive.
