= Sweet Revenge (1921 film) =

1921 film

- Directed by: Edward Laemmle
- Written by: Ford Beebe
- Starring: Hoot Gibson
- Production company: Universal Film Manufacturing Company
- Distributed by: Universal Film Manufacturing Company
- Release date: January 13, 1921
- Running time: 20 minutes
- Country: United States
- Languages: Silent; English intertitles

Sweet Revenge is a 1921 American short silent Western film directed by Edward Laemmle and featuring Hoot Gibson.

== Plot ==
According to a film magazine, "Hoot Douglas is the only cattleman in a land given over to the sheepmen. He loves Betty, daughter of Adams, the wealthiest cattleman in the country, and his love is returned. Adams' foreman, Carnes, dislikes Hoot and determines to get him out of the country. He works up Adams' ire and he finally tells Hoot he will have to get out. Hoot leaves, after telling Adams that some time he will have to come to him (Hoot) and say "Please."

While they are talking Adams' small son, Bobby, roams away, and a search is made for him, without avail. Hoot meets the youngster and takes him to his cabin. He conceives the idea of holding the kid and writing a note to his father telling him he has Bobby and that he can get him by saying "Please." He sees Carnes passing, and asks him to deliver the note, but forgets to seal it. Carnes reads it, and decides he can make a little easy money by demanding ransom for the child. He and his pals accordingly write the old man a note and Adams falls for it. He brings the money to the designated place and is followed by Betty who is seen by the crooks and taken to their cabin, where she is to be held until they can get away. Carnes also decides to get the reward offered, by telling Adams where the boy is. One of his pals goes to Hoot's cabin, knocks Hoot on the head and takes Bobby to Games' cabin. Hoot goes to the cabin and gets the better of Carnes and his pals, just as Adams and a friend ride up. Adams has previously marked the money he had left for the supposed kidnappers, and it is this money which incriminates Carnes and his pals, and everything ends happily for Hoot."

== Cast ==
- Jim Corey as Ben Carnes
- Hoot Gibson as Hoot Douglas
- Otto Nelson as Will Adams
- Roy Stecker as Bobby Adams
- Gertrude Olmstead as Betty Adams
