= Don Desperado =

1927 film

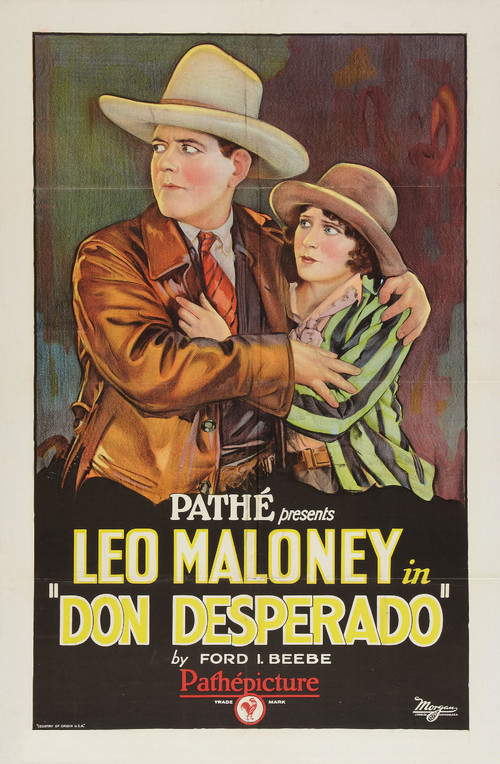
- Directed by: Leo D. Maloney
- Written by: Ford Beebe
- Produced by: Leo D. Maloney
- Starring: Leo D. Maloney; Eugenia Gilbert; Charles Bartlett
- Cinematography: Ben White
- Production company: Leo Maloney Productions
- Distributed by: Pathé Exchange
- Release date: May 8, 1927
- Running time: 50 minutes
- Country: United States
- Languages: Silent; English intertitles

Don Desperado is a 1927 American silent Western film directed by Leo D. Maloney starring Maloney, Eugenia Gilbert and Charles Bartlett.

== Cast ==
- Leo D. Maloney as Leo McHale
- Eugenia Gilbert as Doris Jessup
- Frederick Dana as Nathan Jessup
- Charles Bartlett as Aaron Blaisdell
- Whitehorse as Ables
- Bud Osborne as Frenchy
- Allen Watt as Agent
- Morgan Davis as Joe Jessup
- Harry W. Ramsey as Dr. Wilder
