= Superstition (1920 film) =

1920 film

- Directed by: Edward Laemmle
- Written by: Ford Beebe; Arthur Henry Gooden
- Starring: Hoot Gibson
- Distributed by: Universal Film Manufacturing Co.
- Release date: December 4, 1920
- Running time: 20 minutes
- Country: United States
- Languages: Silent; English intertitles

Superstition is a 1920 American two-reel silent Western film directed by Edward Laemmle for the Universal Film Manufacturing Company and featuring Hoot Gibson. It was based on a story by Arthur Henry Gooden, with a scenario by Ford Beebe.

== Plot ==
This plot comes from the original movie marketing materials in 1920:

Dave Bodie, homesteader, is superstitious to a great degree. He believes in evil omens and to a certain extent they govern his every move. This despite the fact that otherwise he is a courageous young man. Dave is engaged to marry the local school teacher. He meets her on the road home from school and together they sit by a stream talking. The conversation is interrupted by Dave's finding a horseshoe which elates him because he assumes that it means the speedy arrival of good luck. Hallie, the teacher, is above superstition and a quarrel grows out of their opposing ideas on the subject, Hallie ending by throwing away the shoe and returning Dave's engagement ring.

He has not yet reached home when angry at the turn of events, he kicks a can from his path, which frightens a team down below which is being driven townwards by Sadie, the sweetheart of Joe Fields, ranch foreman. Realizing that he is to blame for the runaway, Dave rides after the team and performs a rescue. He drives the team to town for the girl, which action is misunderstood by both Hallie and Joe. Joe is about to take a shot at Dave, but is prevented from it by his friends, who suggest a less dangerous means of revenge.

A few days later Dave receives notice that a contest has been filed against his claim. He is disheartened at this bit of bad luck. He tosses away a cigarette and goes in his shack. The cigarette sets fire to grass and the shack takes fire. Dave goes to the water bucket and finds it empty. He starts to pump water and in his excitement breaks off the pump handle. The house burns. He is accused by Fields of setting it afire deliberately. A fight follows, in which Dave is victor. Hallie, hearing of the contest, is remorseful at her action in throwing away the horseshoe and in sorrow goes to the scene of the quarrel, where she finds the shoe and also the engagement ring which Dave has thrown away in anger.

After whipping Joe, Dave advises him to ask Sadie for the explanation. Fields does so and learns the true state of affairs of how he happened to be driving her. He tears up the contest notice and the two men become friends. Hallie returns to town with the shoe and ring, which she uses to patch up their quarrel.

— A. H. Gooden (story), Ford Beebe (scenario writer), Superstition

== Cast ==
- Hoot Gibson as Dave Bodie
- Dorothy Wood as Hallie Moss
- Jim Corey as Joe Fields
- Betty Keller as Sadie Moore
- Charles Newton (listed as Chas. Newton) as Mr. Moss
