= The Outlaw Express =

1926 film

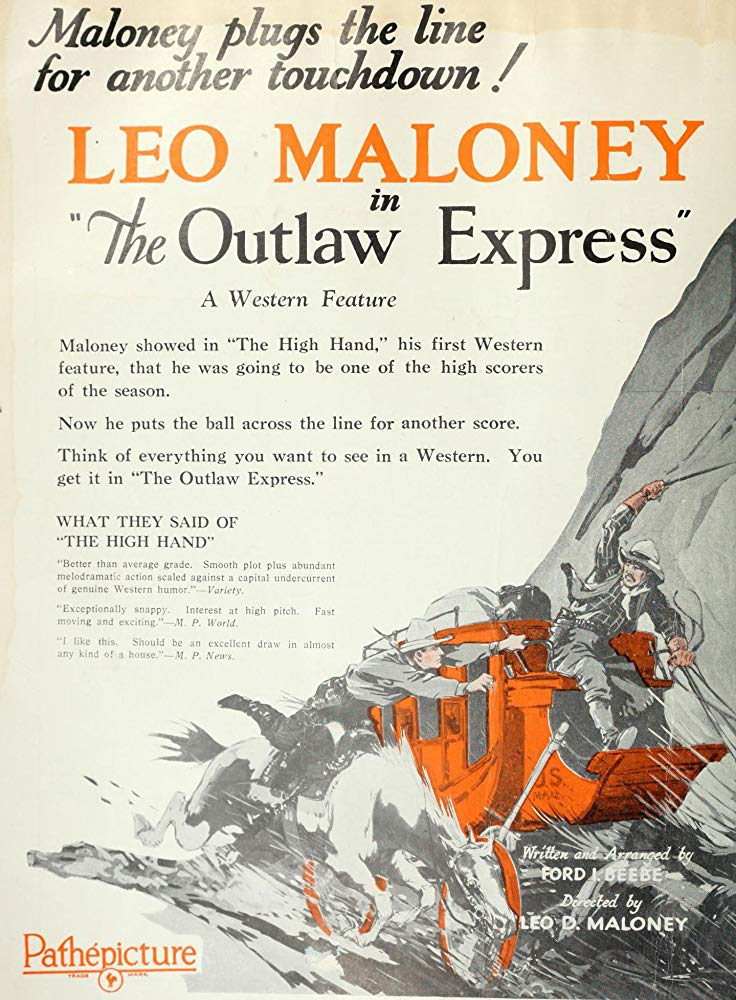
- Directed by: Leo D. Maloney
- Written by: Ford Beebe
- Produced by: Leo D. Maloney
- Starring: Leo D. Maloney; Joan Renee; Melbourne MacDowell
- Cinematography: Harry Cooper
- Production company: Leo Maloney Productions
- Distributed by: Pathe Exchange
- Release date: November 14, 1926
- Country: United States
- Languages: Silent; English intertitles

The Outlaw Express is a lost 1926 American silent Western film directed by Leo D. Maloney and starring Leo D. Maloney, Joan Renee and Melbourne MacDowell.

== Cast ==
- Leo D. Maloney as Miles Wayburn
- Joan Renee as Ann Townsend
- Melbourne MacDowell as Sheriff
- Al Hart as Carl Larson
- Henry Otto as John Mills
- Paul Hurst as Secretary
- Bud Osborne as 'Blackie' Lewis
- Eva Thatcher as Ma Hemstetter
- Nelson McDowell as 'Chaw' Egan
- Fred Burns as 'Borax' Jones
- Frank Ellis as Scott

== Bibliography ==
- Munden, Kenneth White. The American Film Institute Catalog of Motion Pictures Produced in the United States, Part 1. University of California Press, 1997.
