= One Law for All =

1920 film

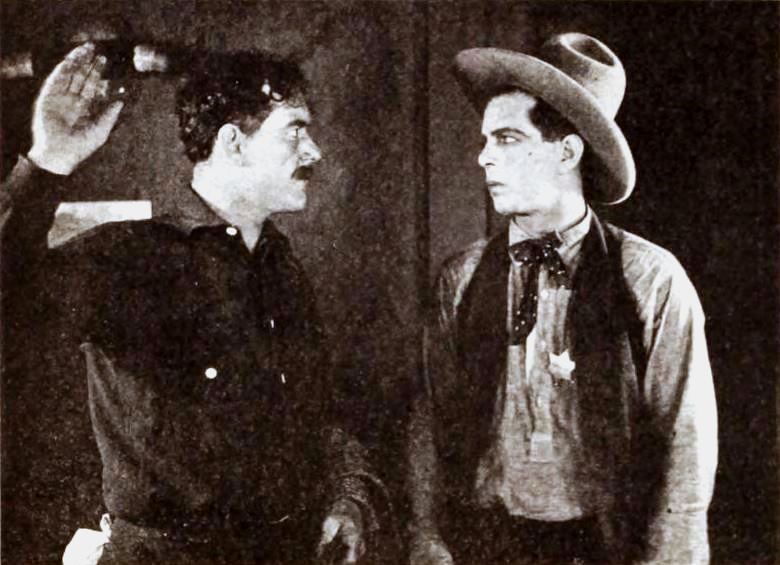
- Still with Leo D. Maloney and Hoot Gibson
- Directed by: Leo D. Maloney
- Written by: Ford Beebe
- Starring: Hoot Gibson
- Production company: Universal Film Manufacturing Company
- Distributed by: Universal Film Manufacturing Company
- Release date: October 16, 1920
- Running time: 20 minutes
- Country: United States
- Languages: Silent; English intertitles

One Law for All is a 1920 American short silent Western film directed by Leo D. Maloney and featuring Hoot Gibson.

== Plot ==
According to a film magazine, "To have come East with a shipment of steers and seeing the docks in a large city meant quite a bit to "Square" Winslow, owner of a large ranch in Arizona. "Square" arrived at the docks in time to see Bjorn Klavok and his daughter, Gerda, who had just come over from the "Country of the Oppressed," exit from the immigration office. Bjorn, through a misunderstanding, gets himself into trouble with an officer of the law, and is rescued by the timely interference of "Square" Winslow. "Square" decides to make a real, true American out of the immigrant, and invites him to his ranch in Arizona.

Things are not so roseate for Bjorn and his daughter on the ranch, as the cowboys seem to take a great delight in jovial expressions at Bjorn's expense, which has a tendency to imbue him with the spirit that America is analogous in fact to the principles of his native country "Square" again comes to his rescue, and convinces him that it would be for the best to shave off his outer facial decorations, which Bjorn reluctantly consents to do.

As time elapses, "Square" is appointed sheriff for the country, and in turn appoints Bjorn foreman of his ranch. "Square" leaves the money for the payroll with Gerda, and rides out to meet Bjorn. who is somewhere on the ranch. Melchor, formerly employed on the ranch, peering through the bushes, sees what has transpired, and knowing Gerda to be alone, takes advantage of her. As he struggles with Gerda, a stranger who has lost himself, enters upon the scene and struggles with Melchor. Melchor notices the arrival of Bjorn and "Square" in the distance, and attempts to extricate himself from the predicament in which he has placed himself. Under threat of death to her father, he forces Gerda to tell them that the stranger is really the crook who attempted to forcibly take the money from her. As "Square" faces the stranger, he discovers that he is his brother. Not desiring to place his own brother under aiTest, he empowers Bjorn with the authority of law, who makes the arrest. "Square," in the meantime, discovers Melchor with the gun on the outside, struggles with him and makes him prisoner, thereby forcing him to confess who the real thief is.

Bjorn is so impressed with this, that he firmly resolves to secure his second papers. He is firmly convinced that the laws of America are in no way analogous to those of his native country. As he expresses his desire that some day his daughter marry an American, "Square" takes him at his word, and pulling out an engagement ring, places it on Gerda's finger."

== Cast ==
- Hoot Gibson as "Square" Wilson
- Dorothy Wood as Gerda Klavok
- Jim Corey as Oily Melchor
- Leo D. Maloney as Bjorn Klavok (credited as Leo Maloney)

== See also ==
- Hoot Gibson filmography
