= The Devil's Partner (1926 film) =

1926 film

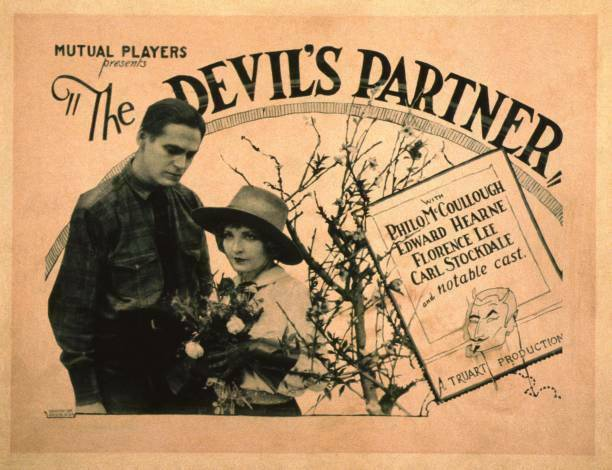
- Directed by: Fred Becker
- Written by: Fred Becker
- Starring: Edward Hearn; Carl Stockdale; Philo McCullough
- Cinematography: John Thompson
- Edited by: Byron Robinson
- Production company: Mutual Players
- Distributed by: Truart Film Corporation
- Release date: March 6, 1926
- Running time: 50 minutes
- Country: United States
- Languages: Silent; English intertitles

The Devil's Partner is a 1926 American silent Western film directed by Fred Becker and starring Edward Hearn, Carl Stockdale and Philo McCullough. A print of The Devil's Partner exists.

== Cast ==
- Edward Hearn as Glen Wilson
- Nancy Deaver as Jane Martin
- Florence Lee as Deputy Sheriff's Wife
- Philo McCullough as Ramon Jennings - Border Rustler
- Carl Stockdale as James Martin - Rancher
- Harvey Clark as Henry Waffle - Deputy Sheriff
- Billie Latimer as Mrs. Henry Waffle
- Fred Becker as Pedro
- Will Walling as Sheriff McHenry
- Hayden Stevenson as Amos Wilson - Rancher
