= Jim Corey =

American actor (1889–1950)

- Born: Arthur Harrison Corey; March 22, 1889; Buffalo, New York, U.S.
- Died: March 26, 1950 (aged 61); Los Angeles, California, U.S.
- Occupation: Actor
- Years active: 1914–1948

Arthur Harrison "Jim" Corey (March 22, 1889 – March 26, 1950) was an American actor. He appeared in more than 300 films between 1914 and 1948. He was born in Buffalo, New York and died in Los Angeles, California.

== Selected filmography ==
- The Master Key (1914) - Wah Sing
- Cheyenne's Pal (1917, Short) - Noisy Jim
- The Phantom Riders (1918) - Foreman
- His Nose in the Book (1920)
- Wolf Tracks (1920)
- Masked (1920)
- The Broncho Kid (1920)
- The Fightin' Terror (1920)
- The Shootin' Kid (1920)
- The Smilin' Kid (1920)
- The Champion Liar (1920)
- The Big Catch (1920)
- A Gamblin' Fool (1920)
- The Grinning Granger (1920)
- One Law for All (1920)
- The Shootin' Fool (1920, Short)
- 'In Wrong' Wright (1920)
- Cinders (1920)
- Double Danger (1920)
- The Two-Fisted Lover (1920)
- Tipped Off (1920)
- Superstition (1920)
- Fight It Out (1920)
- The Man with the Punch (1920)
- The Trail of the Hound (1920)
- The Saddle King (1921, Short)
- The Driftin' Kid (1921)
- Sweet Revenge (1921)
- Out o' Luck (1921)
- Action (1921)
- Winners of the West (1921)
- Red Courage (1921)
- Headin' West (1922)
- In the Days of Buffalo Bill (1922)
- The Oregon Trail (1923)
- The Dangerous Coward (1924)
- Unseen Hands (1924)
- The Border Legion (1924)
- The Burning Trail (1925)
- Wild Horse Mesa (1925)
- The Calgary Stampede (1925)
- Galloping On (1925)
- The Bar-C Mystery (1926)
- The Shoot 'Em Up Kid (1926)
- The Man from Oklahoma (1926)
- Hair-Trigger Baxter (1926)
- The Blind Trail (1926)
- Red Hot Leather (1926)
- Hey! Hey! Cowboy (1927)
- The Last Outlaw (1927)
- Nevada (1927)
- Open Range (1927)
- Tide of Empire (1929)
- Points West (1929)
- The Mounted Stranger (1930)
- The Lone Rider (1930)
- Red Fork Range (1931)
- Guns in the Dark (1937)
- The Shepherd of the Hills (1941)
- Sheriff of Tombstone (1941)
- In Old California (1942)
- Marshal of Reno (1944)
