= Cinders (1920 film) =

1920 film

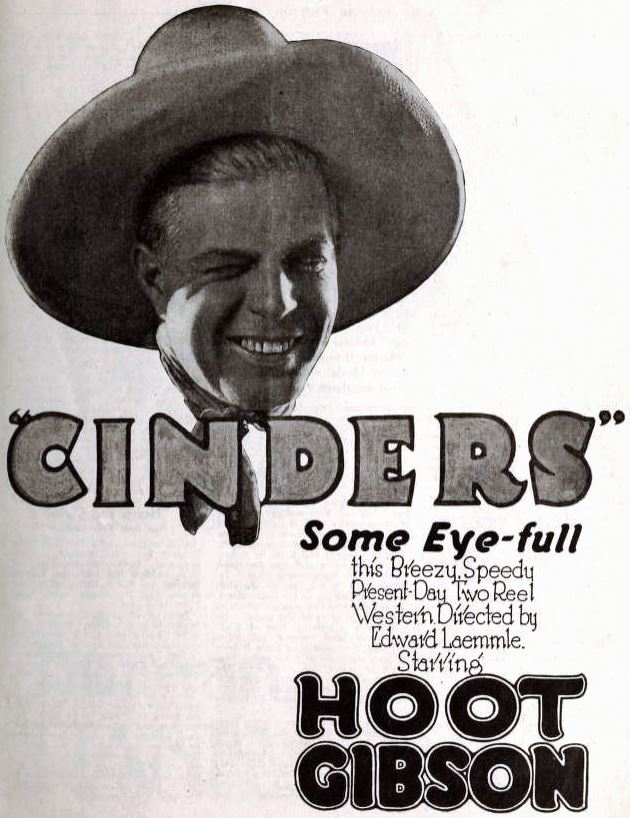
- Trade advertisement
- Directed by: Edward Laemmle
- Written by: George Hively; W. C. Tuttle
- Starring: Hoot Gibson
- Production company: Universal Film Manufacturing Company
- Distributed by: Universal Film Manufacturing Company
- Release date: November 6, 1920
- Running time: 20 minutes
- Country: United States
- Language: Silent (English intertitles)

Cinders is a 1920 American short silent Western film directed by Edward Laemmle and featuring Hoot Gibson.

== Plot ==
As described in a film magazine, Bing fondly adores Joyce and she really loves Bing, but is not into giving him any encouragement. One day Bing flirts with Stella, who is riding in a rail inspection car with her father, a railway company manager, which gets Joyce angry. Stella likes to do daredevil stunts and pranks, and when the train reaches the next railroad station she sends back a message to town that it has been held up. Bing gets the message from the railway agent and races to the scene. In the meantime, 'Wearie' Willie is conducting an actual holdup, and Bing arrives in time to get the draw on him. The conductor, however, misconstrues the actions of Bing and fells him, allowing the real bandit to escape. Stella relents of her actions and trails Bing. Bing catches the bandit just as Stella arrives and, after some explanations, everything is cleared up.

== Cast ==
- Hoot Gibson as 'Bing' Davidson
- Dorothy Wood as Joyce Raymond (credited as Dorothy Woods)
- Jim Corey as 'Wearie' Willie

== See also ==
- List of American films of 1920
