= The Man with the Punch =

1920 film

- Directed by: Edward Laemmle
- Written by: Burl Armstrong; W. C. Tuttle
- Produced by: Carl Laemmle
- Starring: Hoot Gibson
- Release date: December 18, 1920
- Running time: 19 minutes
- Country: United States
- Languages: Silent; English intertitles

The Man with the Punch is a 1920 American short silent Western film directed by Edward Laemmle and featuring Hoot Gibson.

== Plot ==
This is the plot published in The Moving Picture Weekly for December 11, 1920:

Mary Lane and her father, Frank Lane, live in a small western town which is in the grip of a lawless element, at the head of which is the supine sheriff, Jeff Sellers. As cowboys ride shooting through the town, Lane and Mary protest to Sellers, who knocks Lane down. Lane flees, leaving his hat and an old envelope addressed to him. Snake Harris, an outlaw, comes riding into town bringing a letter to Sellers from Shoshone Jim. It seems Sellers has sent to Shoshone for a real bad man. Snake is drunk and loses the letter; also he loses his way and takes the wrong road. The Stranger finds Snake's letter at the crossroads and delivers it to Sellers. Sellers, thinking The Stranger is the one Shoshone sent, plans with The Stranger to rob the stage of a gold shipment. The Stranger is to take Lane's letter and hat, leave them at the scene of the robbery for an alibi, as the stage driver is in on the plan. But The Stranger meets Mary and Lane, has a fight with Snake in the saloon, and Snake is thrown unconscious into jail by Sellers. The Stranger retrieves the letter from Shoshone Jim and a hat of Sellers and robs the stage. Instead of incriminating Lane he has incriminated Sellers with the hat and letter. The Stranger returns [—] meantime the Sheriff has learned his mistake and released Snake. The Stranger binds Snake and the stage driver, hands the incriminating documents to the Sheriff, who, without investigating, arrests Lane. Then it develops that instead of the evidence pointing to Lane, it points to Sellers, and The Stranger arrests him. It develops The Stranger is a deputy United States marshal. During his brief sojourn in town he has met Mary on several occasions, and a strong love attachment has sprung up between them, so that the romance winds everything up happily.

— Studio publicity, The Moving Picture Weekly

== Cast ==
- Hoot Gibson as the stranger (credited as Ed Hoot Gibson)
- Jim Corey as Sheriff Jeff Sellers
- Charles Newton as Frank Lane
- Dorothy Wood as Mary Lane
- Ben Corbett as Snake Harris (uncredited)

== See also ==
- Hoot Gibson filmography
