= A Gamblin' Fool =

1920 film

- Directed by: Leo D. Maloney
- Written by: Ford Beebe
- Starring: Hoot Gibson
- Production company: Universal Film Manufacturing Company
- Distributed by: Universal Film Manufacturing Company
- Release date: October 2, 1920
- Running time: 20 minutes
- Country: United States
- Languages: Silent; English intertitles

A Gamblin' Fool is a 1920 American short silent Western film released by Universal Film Mfg. Co. (later to become Universal Pictures), written by Ford Beebe, directed by Leo D. Maloney and featuring Hoot Gibson.

== Plot ==
This plot comes from the original Library of Congress copyright filing for the film:

"Happy" Newton, a good-natured "boomer" cowpuncher, leaves the range and heads West. He fall in with a pair of cowpunchers, and, succumbing to his usual weakness, gambling, he loses his hat, shirt, horse and saddle.

In the meantime the stage has been robbed by the Yellow Slicker, so-called because of the oilskin garment he wears. After robbing the stage, the Yellow Slicker betakes himself to an isolated cabin, where he leaves his hat, slicker and horse and hurries for the Burton ranch, where, as a cover for his outlawry, he is employed as foreman.

Happy, hatless, coatless and horseless, passes the outlaw's cabin, where he borrows the slicker, hat and horse, leaving a note behind to explain. Naturally, in town, he is taken for the Yellow Slicker and he has to beat a retreat, and, throwing his dice, he decides with their help on the Burton ranch. There things are in bad shape. June, the daughter, is running the ranch for her invalided father. They owe money to Steve Irons (really the Yellow Slicker), and he demands immediate payment or he will foreclose. The brokers have disappointed June, and the money will not arrive until a later stage, before which time Steve has threatened to foreclose. And to make matters worse, Steve insists on marrying June, but is rebuffed.

In applying for work at the ranch, June assumes that Happy is the Slicker and induces him to hold up the midnight stage so that she can get the money to meet her debt. Happy decides to do so, but Steve interferes, having overheard the plan. However, Happy makes a getaway, pursued by the sheriff's posse, which has been directed by Steve, but the girl, by a clever ruse, leads the posse finally in the opposite direction. She loses the posse and is imprisoned by Steve in his cabin. Steve starts out then to grab the midnight stage, but Happy has already accomplished the feat and makes for the cabin. Inside he is captured by Steve. Finally he is taken by the posse. He tries to tell his story, but is not believed. Fortunately, he remembers the note he left in the cabin which provides his alibi.

Who is the Slicker, however? Happy gets a flash in noting Steve's uneasiness, and taking out his trustworthy dice, he rolls them to decide whether Steve is the Slicker. They tell him the truth; there is a fight, and some of the stuff lost on the earlier stage which Steve had held up is uncovered.

The posse leaves with Steve, and Happy is blissful in the thought that with his reward money he can buy an interest in the Burton ranch and be near the dearest girl in the world — June.

— Ford Beebe, story and scenario

== Cast ==
- Hoot Gibson as Happy Newton
- Dorothy Wood as June Burton
- Jim Corey as Steve (Yellow Slicker)
- Harry Jackson as the Sheriff
- Chick Morrison as Rawhide Burton

== See also ==
- Hoot Gibson filmography
