= The Two-Fisted Lover =

1920 film

- Directed by: Edward Laemmle
- Written by: Ford Beebe
- Starring: Hoot Gibson
- Production company: Universal Film Manufacturing Company
- Distributed by: Universal Film Manufacturing Company
- Release date: November 20, 1920
- Running time: 20 minutes
- Country: United States
- Languages: Silent; English intertitles

The Two-Fisted Lover is a 1920 American short silent Western film directed by Edward Laemmle and featuring Hoot Gibson.

== Plot ==
According to a film magazine, "Clara Stebbins is the wife of Sam Griggs, and her five-year-old daughter Emily is their child, but in Twin Springs these facts are not known, and Clara and Emily are treated as outcasts. Sick and without funds, Clara writes Griggs a letter for aid.

A new school teacher arrives, but due to the fact that one child is missing to make the quota demanded by the law, the school will not open. Scot McHale, a bashful young rancher, sympathizing with the young teacher in her distress, decides to go back to school, and thus her position is saved.

Clara dies and the teacher volunteers to adopt the child. Griggs is in love with the teacher, and realizing what McHale does not, that she is in love with him, he determines to poison her mind against him and shows her an unfinished note found in the dead Clara's hand which named her husband as "S." He makes the inference that had the note finished "S" would have been Scot. He further tells her that Scot is really educated and is making a fool of her by going to school. Though resenting Griggs' actions, the teacher becomes suspicious, especially since Scot is so attached to Emily.

She determines to leave town with Emily and as they are in the stage, Griggs again attempts to make love to her, and when she repulses him he grabs the reins during the driver's absence, intending to drive them to an old shack of his in the hills. McHale sees the stage driving like mad over the road; he takes in the situation at a glance and rescues the pretty teacher and her charge. Griggs is thrown out during the fight, and Clara's letter found on him, thus establishing his identity as the husband and clearing Scot of suspicion. A reconciliation follows, and Emily now has a new father as well as mother."

== Cast ==
- Hoot Gibson as Scot McHale
- Dorothy Wood as School Teacher
- Jim Corey as Samuel Griggs
- Walter Crowley as Mr. Brown
- Katherine Bates as Mrs. Brown
- Nancy Caswell as Emily Stebbins
- Charles Newton Doc Wells

== See also ==
- Hoot Gibson filmography
