= Nelson McDowell =

American actor (1870–1947)

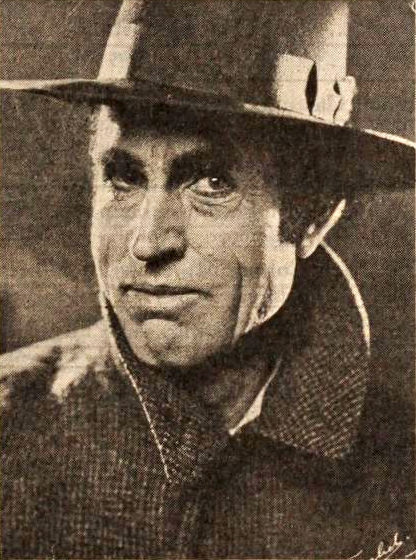
- McDowell in 1920
- Born: August 14, 1870; Greenville, Missouri, US
- Died: November 3, 1947 (aged 77); Hollywood, California, US
- Education: Northwestern University (A.B. and D.D.S.)
- Years active: 1917-1945

Nelson McDowell (August 14, 1870 – November 3, 1947) was an American actor. He appeared in more than 170 films between 1917 and 1945.

McDowell was born in Greenville, Missouri. His parents were N. B. McDowell and Anne Hampton. He attended Leadville (Colorado) High School and Normal College in Fremont, Nebraska, before earning A.B. and D.D.S. degrees from Northwestern University in Chicago. Prior to embarking on a theatrical career, McDowell had a career in dentistry. In 1901, he was appointed professor of orthodontics at the University of Illinois.

In 1902, McDowell acted on stage in Chicago and in Lincoln, Nebraska. His film debut came in 1910 with Biograph.

McDowell died in Hollywood, California after he shot himself.

== Partial filmography ==
- The Scarlet Car (1917)
- The Feud (1919)
- Masked (1920)
- Cupid the Cowpuncher (1920)
- Going Some (1920)
- Down Home (1920)
- The Last of the Mohicans (1920)
- Home Stuff (1921)
- Shadows of Conscience (1921)
- The Silent Call (1921)
- The Girl Who Ran Wild (1922)
- Oliver Twist (1922)
- The Girl of the Golden West (1923)
- Blood Test (1923)
- Pioneer Trails (1923)
- The Ridin' Kid from Powder River (1924)
- Galloping Gallagher (1924)
- The Heart Bandit (1924)
- Idaho (1925)
- Gold and Grit (1925)
- On the Go (1925)
- A Streak of Luck (1925)
- Manhattan Madness (1925)
- The Phantom Bullet (1926)
- Lightning Reporter (1926)
- The Frontier Trail (1926)
- The Blind Trail (1926)
- The Valley of Bravery (1926)
- Fighting with Buffalo Bill (1926)
- The Ramblin' Galoot (1926)
- The Outlaw Express (1926)
- Crossed Signals (1926)
- Border Blackbirds (1927)
- Great Mail Robbery (1927)
- The Bugle Call (1927)
- The Vanishing Rider (1928)
- Wild Blood (1928)
- The Little Shepherd of Kingdom Come (1928)
- Kit Carson (1928)
- Lilac Time (1928)
- The Code of the Scarlet (1928)
- Heart Trouble (1928)
- Queen of the Northwoods (1929)
- The Texas Ranger (1931)
- Guns for Hire (1932)
- The Last of the Mohicans (1932)
- Come On, Tarzan (1932)
- The Scarlet Brand (1932)
- Fighting Through (1934)
- The Dawn Rider (1935)
- Wilderness Mail (1935)
- Gun Smoke (1936)
- Ridin' On (1936)
- Westbound Stage (1939)
- Pioneer Days (1940)
- Roll Wagons Roll (1940)
- Lone Texas Ranger (1945)
