= The High Hand =

1926 film

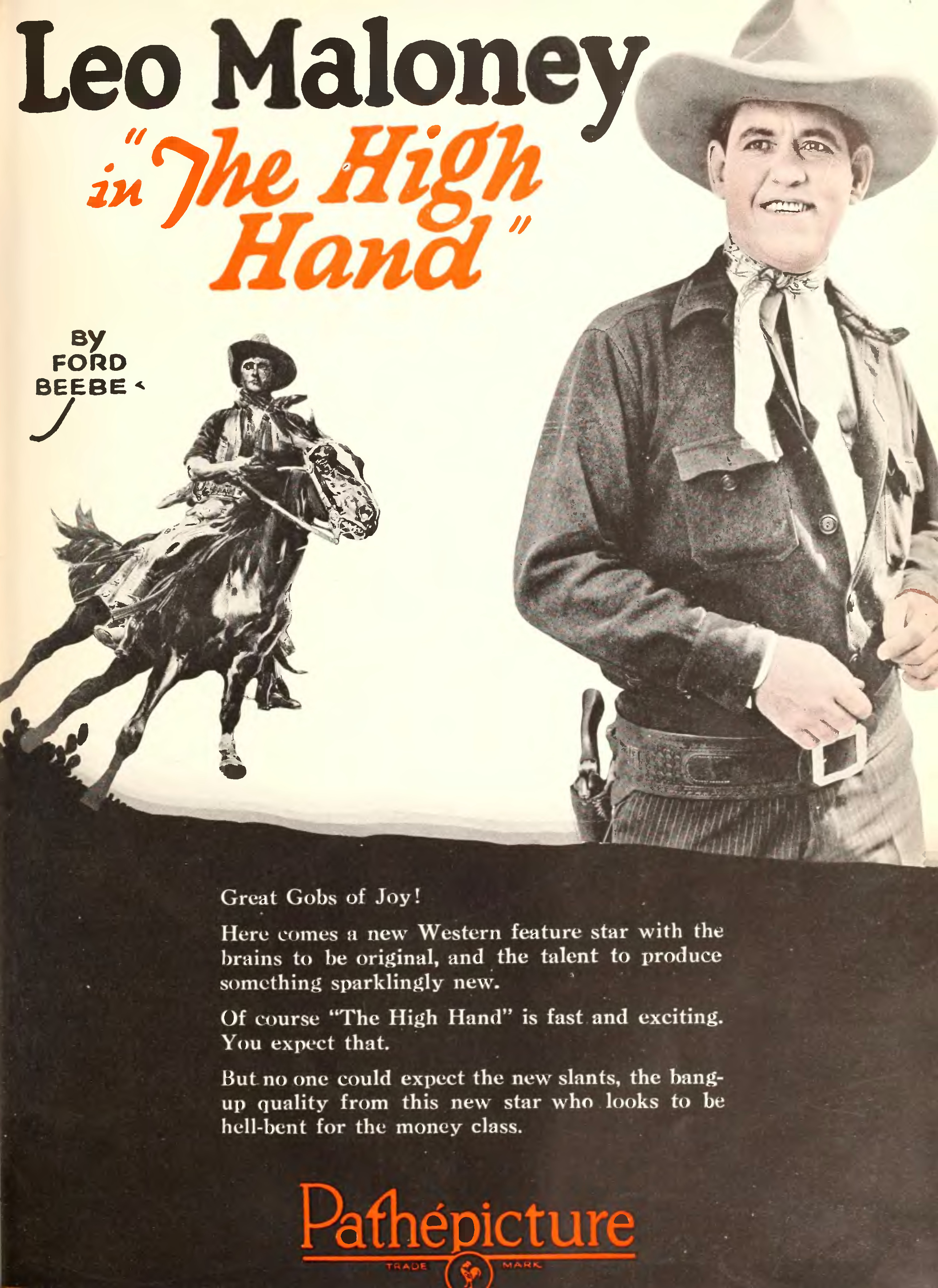
- Directed by: Leo D. Maloney
- Written by: Ford Beebe
- Produced by: Leo D. Maloney
- Starring: Leo D. Maloney; Josephine Hill; Paul Hurst
- Cinematography: Hal Mohr
- Production company: Leo Maloney Productions
- Distributed by: Pathé Exchange
- Release date: September 12, 1926
- Running time: 50 minutes
- Country: United States
- Language: Silent (English intertitles)

The High Hand is a 1926 American silent Western film directed by Leo D. Maloney and starring Maloney, Josephine Hill, and Paul Hurst.

== Cast ==
- Leo D. Maloney as Sandy Sands
- Josephine Hill as Edith Oaks
- Paul Hurst as Chris Doble
- Murdock MacQuarrie as Martin Shaler
- Whitehorse as John Oaks
- Gus Saville as Swamper
- Dick La Reno as Sheriff
- Florence Lee as Mrs. Oaks
- Bob Burns as Cowhand

== Preservation ==
With no prints of The High Hand located in any film archives, it is a lost film.
