= The Pride of the Legion =

1932 film

- Directed by: Ford Beebe
- Written by: Peter B. Kyne; Ford Beebe
- Produced by: Nat Levine
- Starring: Victor Jory; Barbara Kent; Sally Blane
- Cinematography: Ernest Miller; Carl Wester
- Edited by: Ray Snyder
- Production company: Mascot Pictures
- Distributed by: Mascot Pictures
- Release date: October 18, 1932
- Running time: 70 minutes
- Country: United States
- Language: English

The Pride of the Legion is a 1932 American pre-Code crime film directed by Ford Beebe and starring Victor Jory, Barbara Kent and Sally Blane.

== Cast ==
- Victor Jory as Jerry Brewster
- Barbara Kent as Martha Tully
- J. Farrell MacDonald as Police Chief Scott
- Lucien Littlefield as 'Dad' Tully
- Sally Blane as Peggy Smith
- Glenn Tryon as Tommy Tully
- Matt Moore as Cavanaugh
- Ralph Ince as Klafki
- Tom Dugan as Carnes
- Jason Robards Sr. as Moran
- Rin Tin Tin Jr. as Rinty
- Douglass Dumbrille as McMahon
- Bob Kortman as Louis
- Ernie Adams as Shorty
- Bud Osborne as Taylor
- William B. Davidson as Police Sgt. Arnold
- Rodney Hildebrand as Police Sgt. Russell
- Jack Cheatham as Police Sgt. Johnson
- Arnold Gray as Police Officer Jones
- Kernan Cripps as Police Sgt. Miller
- Wally Dean as Police Lt. Clark
- Bert Roach as Drunk
- Jack Mower as Walker
- Suzanne Wood as Dowager
- Charles Maurice as Police Officer Brown
- Charles Schaeffer as Sam
- Hector V. Sarno as Cassinelli

== Bibliography ==
- Tuska, Jon. The Vanishing Legion: A History of Mascot Pictures, 1927-1935. McFarland, 1999.
