= The Big Catch (film) =

1920 film

- Directed by: Leo D. Maloney
- Written by: Ford Beebe; Louis D. Lighton
- Starring: Hoot Gibson
- Production company: Universal Film Manufacturing Company
- Distributed by: Universal Film Manufacturing Company
- Release date: September 25, 1920
- Running time: 20 minutes
- Country: United States
- Languages: Silent; English intertitles

The Big Catch is a 1920 American short silent Western film released by the Universal Film Mfg. Co. (later to become Universal Pictures), written by Ford Beebe, directed by Leo D. Maloney and starring Hoot Gibson.

== Plot ==
According to a film magazine, "Billy Reeves foreman of the Flying-M outfit, has an irresistible way with the ladies. His mates, jealous of his prowess and aiming to take him down a peg, are prompted by Slow Evans, Billy's pal, to take advantage of a column of matrimonial ads to fasten a man-hunting woman on Billy's trail. They frame a letter to the most formidable of the advertisers, a widow by the name of Schwartz, and they duplicate this letter to a number of others. Baron, the owner of the ranch, is expecting a woman buyer from a firm in Omaha, with whom Baron wants to do business. Billy is deputied to meet the buyer and be nice to her, but the boss does not want the boys to know.

Slow and the boys are watching for the replies to their letters. On the way home they find on reading the mail that the Widow Schwartz has swallowed the bait and is on her way to town. To repair the damage they have wrought Slow is sent back to receive her and the plan is that the rest of the boys are to hold her up and give her a scare that will discourage her from going to the ranch. At the same time, a little way behind them, Billy is on his way to meet the lady buyer. On his way into town he lets fall information of his errand and the leader of a gang of bad men overhears it and passes the word along to his men. The widow is the first one off the train and calls for Billy, who, thinking she is the buyer, puts her in the buckboard and starts for the ranch. Slow keeps under cover until Billy has got out of sight and finds a pretty young girl looking for Billy. Slow supposes this is the matrimonial bet and mounts her on a horse. The bandits hold up Billy and the widow, carrying off the widow and leaving Billy tied up. The boys stop Slow and the girl and do their best to frighten her without effect. Billy gets the horses started and meets the boys and the girl. He marshals them to follow the bandits and the widow. They pick up the trail which leads to Chimney Rock Canyon, an inaccessible and impregnable retreat. Billy leaves the girl while he makes a circuit of the canyon rim, looking for the best place to make a drop into the bandit's camp. From an opposite place he sees the girl buyer seized by a bandit. He crosses to a tree and creeps upon the bandits, rescuing the girl and the widow. Slow, to make peace with the widow, promises to marry her, while Billy realizes that the girl is the mate he has been waiting all his life for."

== Cast ==
- Hoot Gibson as Bill
- Dorothy Wood as Jane
- Jim Corey as Slow
- Harry Jackson as Buck
- Chick Morrison as Harris
- Ida Tenbrook as Sarah Smith

== See also ==
- List of American films of 1920
- Hoot Gibson filmography
