= The Prescott Kid =

1934 film by David Selman

- Directed by: David Selman
- Written by: Ford Beebe
- Based on: "Wolves of Catclaw" by Claude Rister
- Starring: Tim McCoy; Sheila Mannors; Joseph Sauers
- Cinematography: Benjamin Kline
- Edited by: Ray Snyder; Richard Cahoon
- Production company: Columbia Pictures
- Distributed by: Columbia Pictures
- Release date: November 8, 1934 (US)
- Running time: 58 minutes
- Country: United States
- Language: English

The Prescott Kid is a 1934 American Western film directed by David Selman, from an original screenplay by Ford Beebe, which stars Tim McCoy, Sheila Mannors, and Joseph Sauers. The picture was released on November 8, 1934. The screenplay was based on a short story, "Wolves of Catclaw", by Claude Rister which had appeared in the November 1933 issue of Rangeland Love Magazine.

== Cast ==
- Tim McCoy as Tim Hamlin
- Sheila Mannors as Dolores Ortega
- Joseph Sauers as Captain Willoughby
- Stephen Chase as Ed Walton
- Hooper Atchley as Bonner
- Albert J. Smith as Frazier
- Harry Todd as Dr. Haley
- Walter Brennan as Stage driver
- Carlos De Valdez as Don Rafael Ortega
- Ernie Adams as Red Larson
- Steve Clark as Crocker
- Tom London as Slim, henchman
- Charles King as J. Bones
- Eddie Cobb as Buck
- Jack Curtis as Bartender
- Bud Osborne as Ames
- Charles Brinley as Manuel
- Dick Botiller as Isadoro
- Joe Delacruz as Antonio
