= Jack Ganzhorn =

Silent film actor and script writer (1881–1956)

- Born: March 21, 1881; Fort Thomas, Arizona Territory
- Died: September 19, 1956 (aged 75); Hollywood, California
- Occupations: Silent Film Actor; Script Writer; Author
- Years active: 1922–1942

Jack Ganzhorn (1881–1956) was a silent film actor and script writer of the 1920s and 1930s – primarily in silent film Westerns, Hawk of the Hills (1927 serial) and Fightin' Odds.

== Family ==
John W. "Jack" Ganzhorn was born on March 21, 1881, in Fort Thomas, Arisona Territory the son of William D. Ganzhorn and Ida A. His mother died in December 1882, when Jack was almost two years old.

== Early years ==
Ganzhorn spent his early years living near Tombstone, Arizona. When the Battleship Maine was fired upon in February 1898, Ganzhorn joined the U.S. Navy during the Spanish–American War, from February 1898 to March 1899, and was wounded in the left foot.

== Filmography ==
- Thorobred, 1922 – as Blackie Wells
- The Iron Horse, 1924 – as Thomas C. Durant (uncredited)
- Fightin' Odds, 1925 – as Dave Ormsby
- Thank You, 1925 – as Gossiping Man (uncredited)
- Hawk of the Hills, 1927 – as Henry Selby
- The Apache Raider (1928) – as Breed Artwell
- The Valley of Hunted Men (1928) – as Frenchy Durant
- Hawk of the Hills, 1929 – as Henry Selby

== Publications ==
- I've Killed Men, by Jack Ganzhorn, Robert Hale Limited, 1910
- Damnation Ranch, by Jack Ganzhorn, The Golden West Magazine, September 1929
- Gamblers Guns, by Jack Ganzhorn, Super Western, December 1937
- Leaden Justice, by Jack Ganzhorn, Wild West Stories Magazine, November 1935
- The Worm, by Jack Ganzhorn, Real Western Stories, February 1956
- Lone Star Western, by Jack Ganzhorn, (Australia) #12, 1950s
