= Florence Lee (born 1864) =

American actress

- Born: February 1864; South Carolina
- Died: February 17, 1933 (aged 68 - 69); Los Angeles, California
- Years active: 1911-1931

Florence Lee (1864–1933) was an American silent era actress who appeared in over 90 films between 1911 and 1931. She is perhaps best known to modern audiences for her last film role, that of the blind girl's grandmother in Charlie Chaplin's City Lights (1931). She also appeared in some Our Gang movies during the 1920s.

== Filmography ==
Year	Title	Role	Note
1911	Enoch Arden	On the Beach	Short
1912	A Voice from the Deep	On Roller Coaster	Short, Uncredited
1912	Won by a Fish	At Dinner	Short
1912	His Auto's Maiden Trip		Short
1913	Almost a Wild Man	Actress in The Rise & Fall of McDoo	Short
1922	Hell's Border		
1922	The Trouper	Mrs. Selden	
1922	Top o' the Morning	Jerry's Aunt	
1923	Mary of the Movies	Mary's Mother	
1924	Jack O'Clubs	Mrs. Miller	
1924	Virtue's Revolt	Mrs. Cane	
1925	Just Plain Folks		
1925	The Love Bug	Grandma Thomas	Short
1925	Across the Deadline	Mrs. Revelle	
1925	Ask Grandma	Grandma	Short
1925	Speed Mad	Grandma Smithers	
1925	The Road Agent	Mrs. Worth - the Mother	
1925	The Flame Fighter	Mrs. Sparks	
1925	Luck and Sand	Roy's Mother	
1952	The Movies	The Boy's Mother	Short, Uncredited
1926	My Stars	Johnny's Mother	
1926	The Devil's Partner	Deputy Sheriff's Wife	
1926	The High Hand	Mrs. Oaks	
1928	The Little Buckaroo	Mrs. Durking	
1928	The Bronc Stomper	Mrs. Hollister	
1931	City Lights	The Blind Girl's Grandmother	(final film role)

== Bibliography ==
- Robinson, David (1985). Chaplin:His Life and Art. New York: McGraw-Hill Books Company. ISBN 0-07-053181-1.
