= Winners of the West (1921 serial) =

1921 film

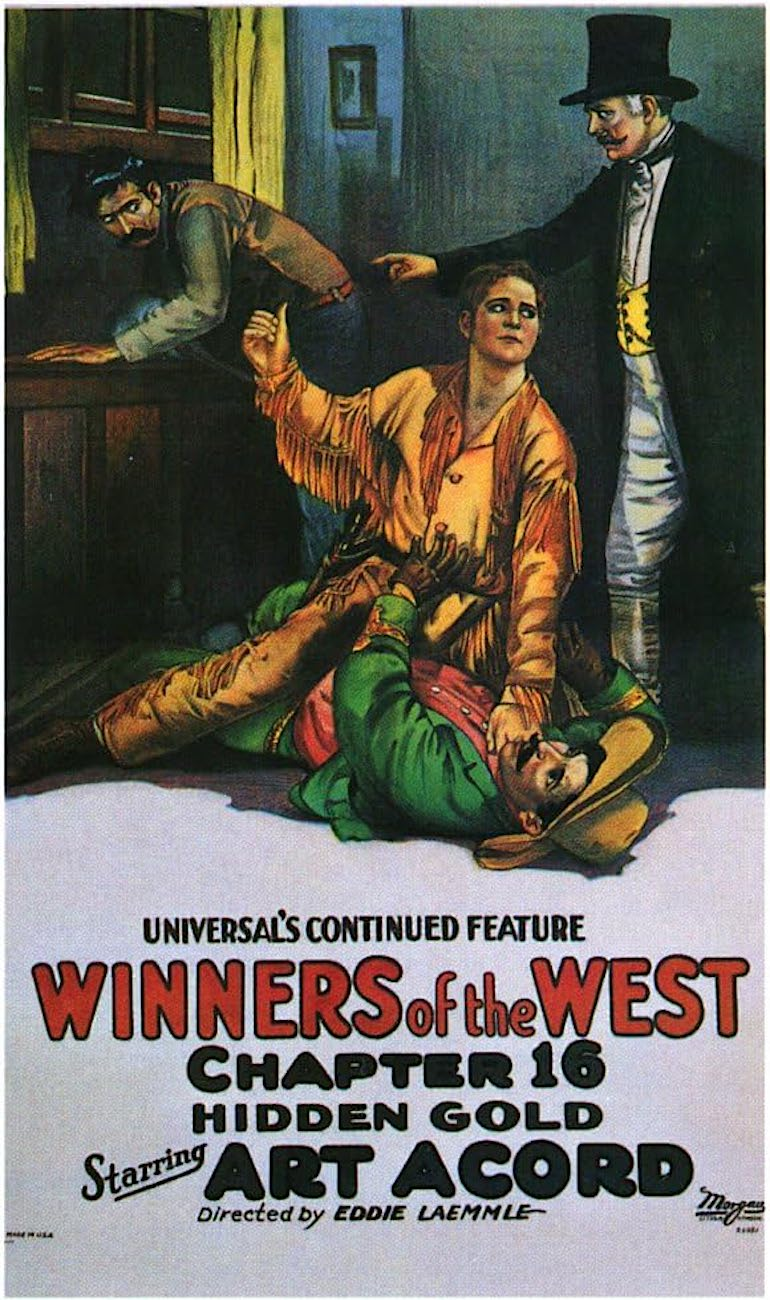
- Film poster for Chapter 16
- Directed by: Edward Laemmle
- Written by: Ford Beebe; Robert Dillon
- Starring: Art Acord; Myrtle Lind
- Distributed by: Universal Film Manufacturing Co.
- Release date: September 26, 1921
- Running time: 18 episodes
- Country: United States
- Languages: Silent; English intertitles

Winners of the West is a 1921 American silent Western film serial directed by Edward Laemmle. This serial is considered to be a lost film.

== Cast ==
- Art Acord as Arthur Standish / The Mysterious Spaniard
- Myrtle Lind as Betty Edwards
- Burton Law as John C. Fremont (credited as Burton C. Law)
- J. Herbert Frank as Squire Blair (credited as Bert Frank)
- Burton S. Wilson as Dr. Edwards (credited as Burt Wilson)
- Jim Corey as Godney
- Scott Pembroke as Louis Blair (credited as Percy Pembroke)
- Bob Kortman as Sioux Warrior (uncredited)

== Chapter titles ==
1. Power of Gold
2. Blazing Arrow
3. Perils of the Plains
4. The Flame of Hate
5. The Fight for a Fortune
6. Buried Alive
7. Fires of Fury
8. Pit of Doom
9. Chasm of Peril
10. Sands of Fear
11. Poisoned Pool
12. Duel in the Night
13. Web of Fate
14. Trail of Mystery
15. Unmasked
16. Hidden Gold
17. Cave of Terror
18. The End of the Trail

== See also ==
- List of film serials
- List of film serials by studio
- List of lost films
