= Fighting Shadows =

1935 film by David Selman

- Directed by: David Selman
- Written by: Ford Beebe
- Produced by: Harry Decker
- Starring: Tim McCoy; Robert Allen; Geneva Mitchell; Ward Bond
- Cinematography: George Meehan
- Edited by: Al Clark
- Production company: Columbia Pictures
- Release date: April 18, 1935 (US)
- Running time: 58 minutes
- Country: United States
- Language: English

Fighting Shadows is a 1935 American Western film directed by David Selman from a screenplay by Ford Beebe, which stars Tim McCoy, Robert Allen, Geneva Mitchell, and Ward Bond. It was McCoy's sixth film in a series of pictures for Columbia Pictures.

== Plot ==
Tim O'Hara is a Canadian Mountie who has been sent into the Indian Territory to investigate claims of a gang of bandits who are terrorizing the local trappers. Being from the area, he looks up an old friend, Hank Bascom, who tells him that a local merchant, Stalkey, has been acting as a middleman for the bandits. When he goes to talk with Stalkey, O'Hara finds his old nemesis, Brad Harrison, already at the store trying to get Stalkey to talk. O'Hara had been in love with Harrison's sister, Martha, but had left the area when he and Harrison had gotten into a heated argument after Harrison had falsely accused O'Hara of stealing from him.

Now, O'Hara tells Harrison to stay out of his way, and as he is beginning to arrest Stalkey, O'Hara is shot at by Randall, a member of the bandit gang. O'Hara pursues Randall, but the bandit escapes. Later, Randall's body is discovered, and Harrison accuses O'Hara of murdering him. To gain the trust of Stalkey, Harrison tells him to go to his cabin to hide out. O'Hara asks Harrison for his help in tracking the gang down, but he refuses. Leaving Harrison, O'Hara goes back to Stalkey's store, where he discovers a cache of stolen furs. Harrison arrives shortly after, and the two men get into a fight, resulting in O'Hara being knocked unconscious. Harrison takes the furs and hides them. Then goes to Stalkey and tells him that O'Hara found them and took them.

Another Mountie, Bob Rutledge, arrives to relieve O'Hara of his duties. After O'Hara refuses to arrest Harrison, who evidence is now pointing to as the gang's leader, Rutledge has O'Hara locked up. When Rutledge goes after Harrison, he is knocked out by Stalkey, but Harrison intervenes and takes the Mountie back to town, rather than letting Stalkey have him killed.

Back in town, Hascom has helped O'Hara to escape, and when Harrison arrives the two men fight. The fight is stopped, however, when Stalkey and the rest of his gang show up and demand that O'Hara turn over the stolen furs. It is revealed that Harrison was not a member of the gang, instead he was trying to get into Stalkey's good graces in order to uncover their identities. O'Hara and Harrison team up, and with several others apprehend the gang.

== Cast ==
- Tim McCoy as Tim O'Hara
- Robert Allen as Bob Rutledge
- Geneva Mitchell as Martha Harrison
- Ward Bond as Brad Harrison
- Si Jenks as Hank Bascom
- Otto Hoffman as Stalkey
- James Mason as Horn
- Bud Osborne as Randall
- Edward LeSaint as Duncan (as Edward Le Saint)
- Richard Alexander as Maddigan
- Allan Sears as Gavin
- Walter Shumway as Jones
- Jess Caven as Hawkins
- Fred Malatesta as Dusquesne
- Ethan Laidlaw as Brannon
- Howard C. Hickman as Inspector Rutledge
- George C. Pearce as Father O'Donovan
- Charles E. Brinley as Lakue
- Jack Mower as Orderly
- Rhody Hathaway as Woodsman
- Steve Clark as Woodsman
- Monte Carter as Trapper
- Robert Wilber as Trapper

(Cast list as per AFI database)

== Production ==
The film was originally titled Guns of the Law, but the title was changed in February 1935. The Legion of Decency gave the picture a Class A rating, meaning that the picture was suitable for the entire family. It was the sixth picture in a series of films which McCoy was making for Columbia Pictures. The picture wrapped production the final week of March 1935.

== Reception ==
The Film Daily gave the film a positive review, "Corking Western provides lots of sock action in suspenseful yarn." The felt the film was excellently acted, directed, produced and filmed. Motion Picture Daily also gave the film a good review. While they felt the plot was a bit worn, they felt it was suspenseful, holding the audience's attention. They especially complimented the cinematography of George Meehan.
