= Edward Laemmle =

American film director (1887–1937)

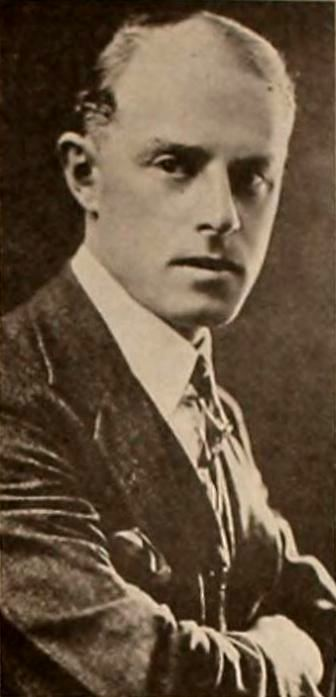
- Laemmle in 1920
- Born: October 25, 1887; Chicago, Illinois
- Died: April 2, 1937 (aged 49); Beverly Hills, California
- Occupation: Film director
- Years active: 1920–1935

Edward Laemmle (October 25, 1887 – April 2, 1937) was an American film director of the silent era. He directed more than 60 films between 1920 and 1935.

== Biography ==
Laemmle was born in Chicago, Illinois, and died in Los Angeles. He was the nephew of Carl Laemmle, founder of Universal Studios. His half sister was Carla Laemmle, dancer and actress. He married Peppi Heller on April 8, 1923; the couple had two girls, Constance and Carlotta, and settled in Beverly Hills, California. He died at his home there from a heart attack on April 2, 1937 at the age of 49.

== Selected filmography ==
- Shipwrecked Among Cannibals (1920)
- Cinders (1920)
- The Two-Fisted Lover (1920)
- Superstition (1920)
- The Man with the Punch (1920)
- The Saddle King (1921)
- Sweet Revenge (1921)
- Winners of the West (1921)
- Top o' the Morning (1922)
- In the Days of Buffalo Bill (1922)
- The Victor (1923)
- The Oregon Trail (1923)
- The Man in Blue (1925)
- Spook Ranch (1925)
- The Whole Town's Talking (1926)
- The Still Alarm (1926)
- Held by the Law (1927)
- Man, Woman and Wife (1929)
- The Drake Case (1929)
