= Leo D. Maloney =

American actor

Leo Daniel Maloney
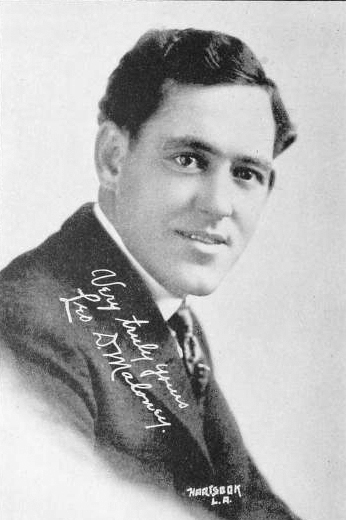
- Maloney in 1915
- Born: January 4, 1888; San Jose, California, U.S.
- Died: November 2, 1929 (aged 41); New York, New York, U.S.
- Education: Santa Clara College
- Occupations: Actor, film director, film producer, screenwriter
- Years active: 1911–1929

Leo Daniel Maloney (January 4, 1888 – November 2, 1929) was an American film actor, director, producer, and screenwriter of the silent era.

== Early life ==
Leo Daniel Maloney was born on January 4, 1888, in San Jose, California. Some sources state, however, that he was born in Santa Rosa, California. He attended Santa Clara College (now Santa Clara University).

== Career ==
He built the "Leo Maloney Studio" in the San Bernardino Mountains of Southern California. He appeared in more than 150 films between 1911 and 1929, and he directed 47 films between 1914 and 1929. He appeared in many Western films by Selig Company (also known as Selig Polyscope Company). His last silent westerns were released by Pathé Exchange.

Leo Maloney's final film was the first independently made talking western, Overland Bound (1929). It was distributed by W. Ray Johnston's Rayart Pictures, later to become better known as Monogram Pictures. Maloney was at a party in Manhattan to celebrate the completion of Overland Bound when he suffered a fatal stroke. His death was probed by police and may have been due to chronic alcoholism.

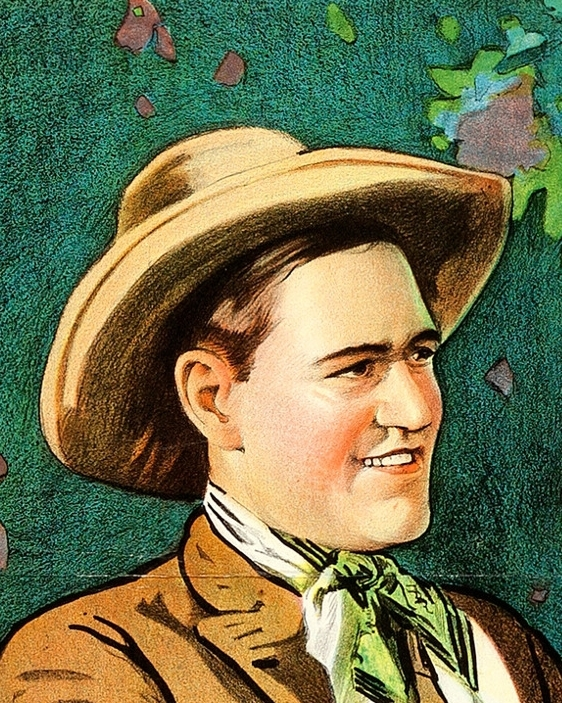
Leo D. Maloney in 1923 poster art

== Filmography ==
- Why the Sheriff Is a Bachelor (1914)
- The Telltale Knife (1914)
- The Hazards of Helen (1914)
- The Man from the East (1914)
- Lass of the Lumberlands (1916)
- The Spitfire of Seville (1919)
- The Fatal Sign (1920)
- The Big Catch (1920)
- A Gamblin' Fool (1920)
- The Grinning Granger (1920)
- One Law for All (1920)
- The Wolverine (1921)
- The Outlaw Express (1926)
- The Blind Trail (1926)
- The High Hand (1926)
- Two-Gun of the Tumbleweed (1927)
- Don Desperado (1927)
- The Man from Hard Pan (1927)
- The Long Loop on the Pecos (1927)
- Border Blackbirds (1927)
- Vultures of the Sea (1928)
- The Black Ace (1928)
- The Apache Raider (1928)
- The Vanishing West (1928)
- The Bronc Stomper (1928)
- Yellow Contraband (1928)
- The Boss of Rustler's Roost (1928)
- .45 Calibre War (1929)
- The Fire Detective (1929)
- Overland Bound (1929, sound film)
