= List of American films of 1921 =

American films released in 1921

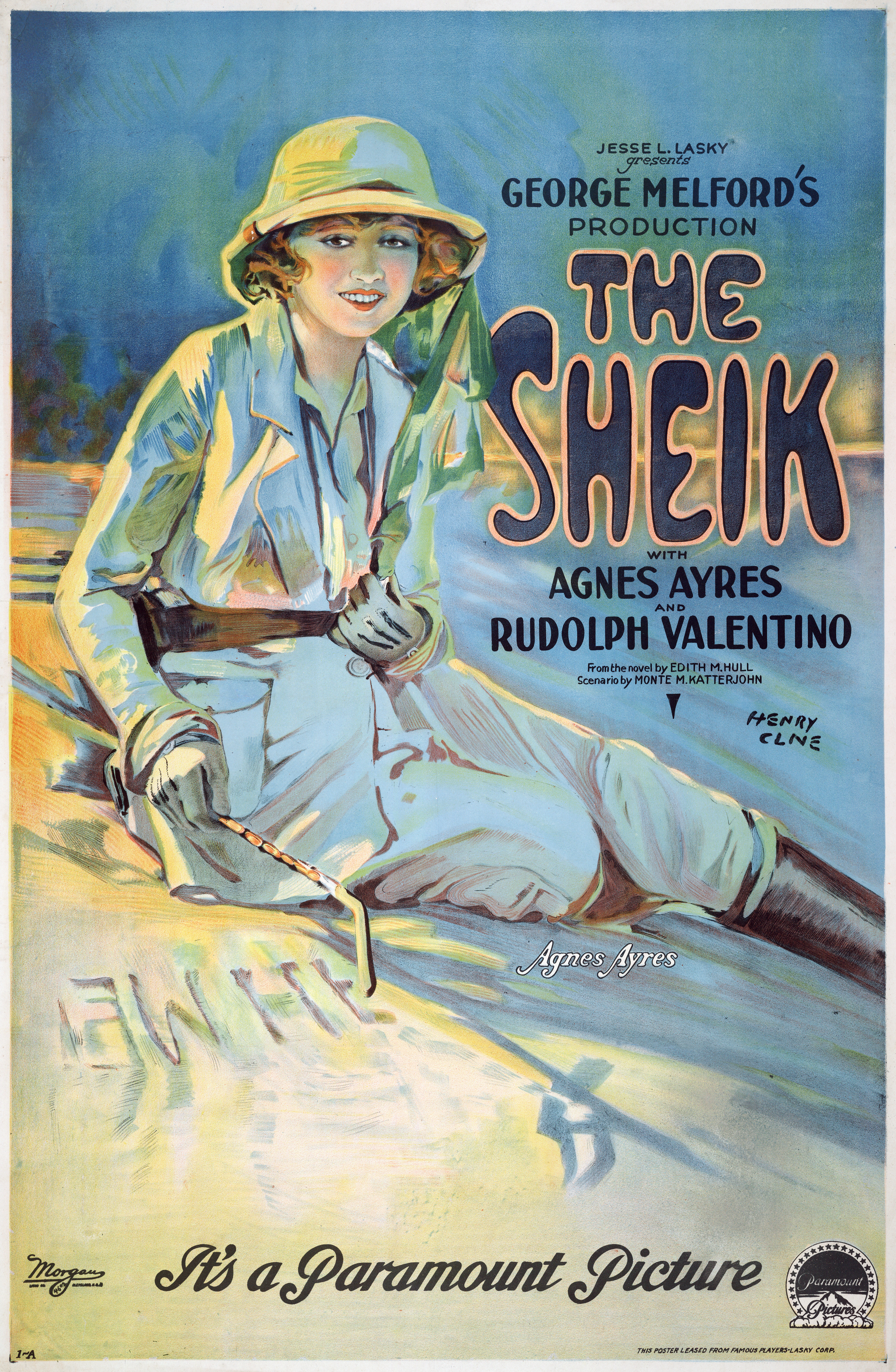
The Sheik starring Rudolph Valentino.

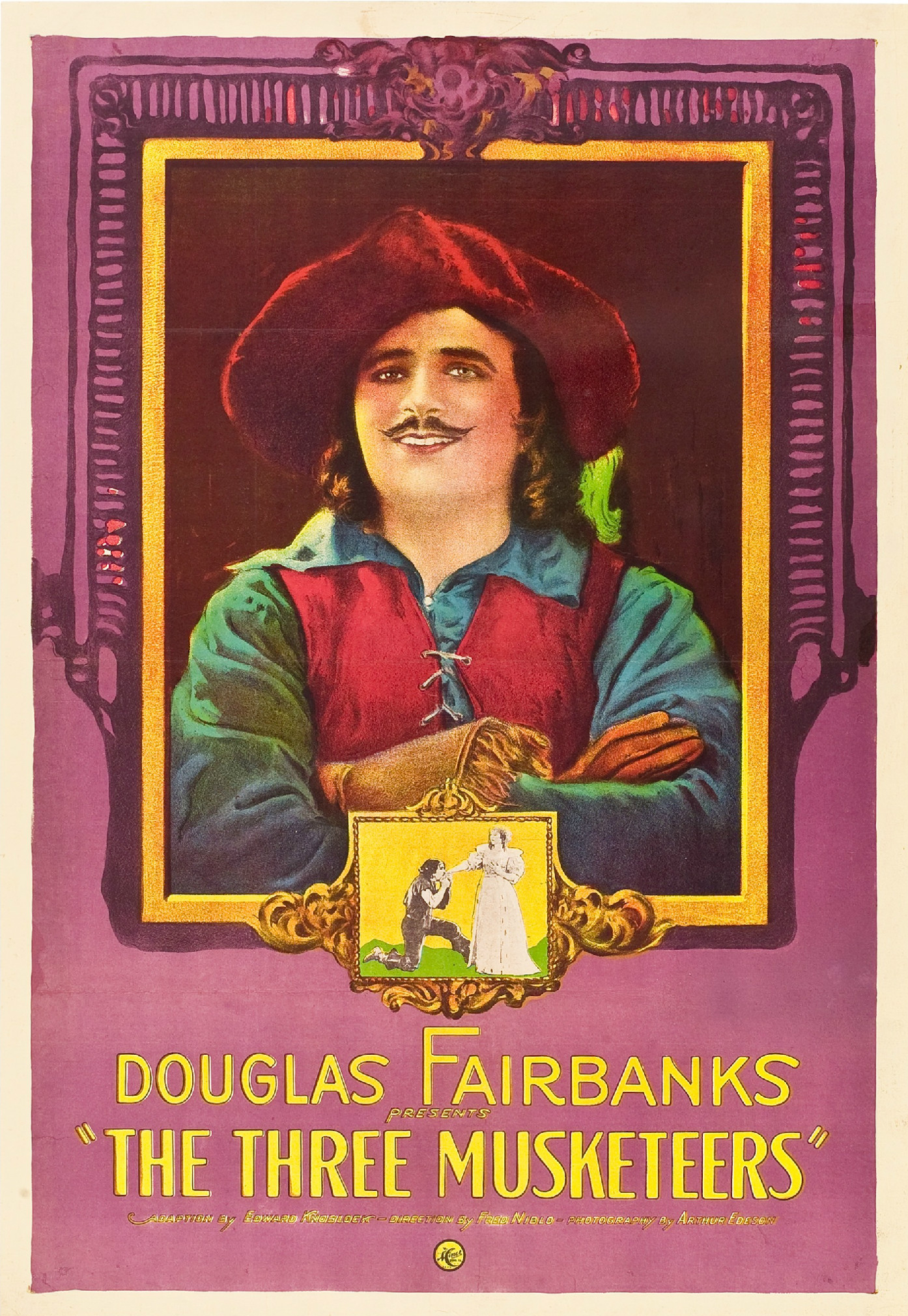
The Three Musketeers starring John Barrymore.

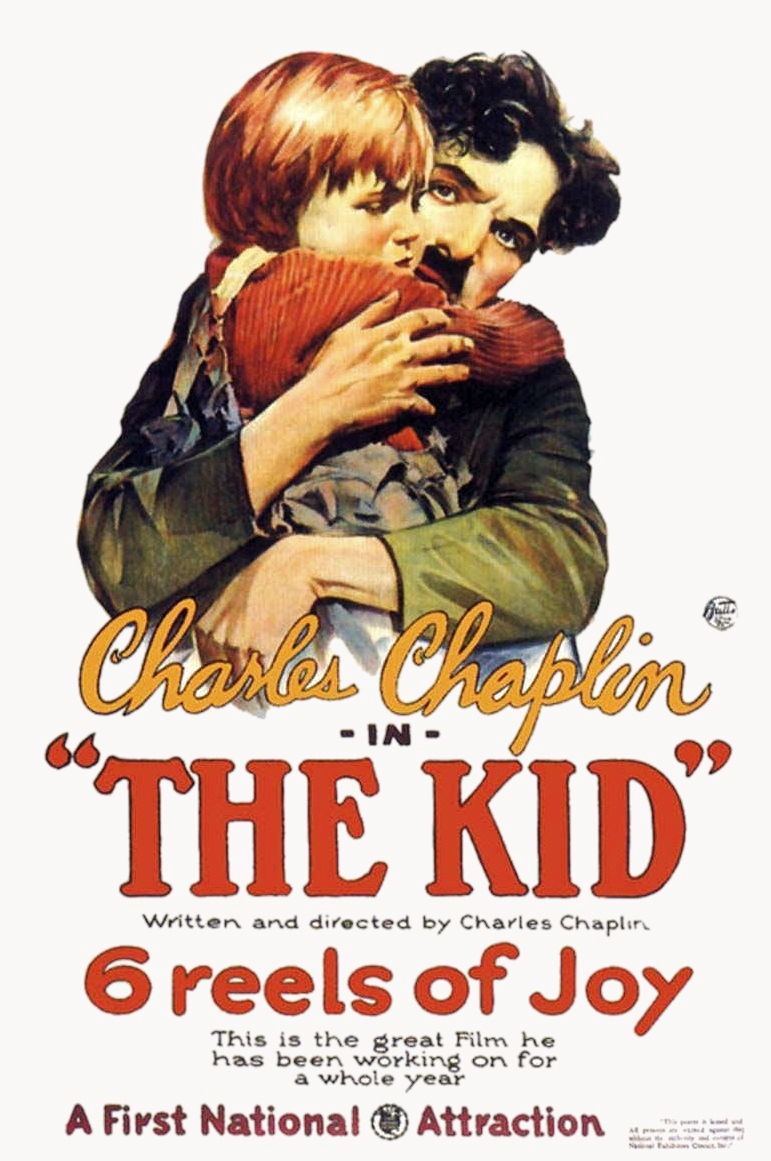
The Kid starring Charlie Chaplin.

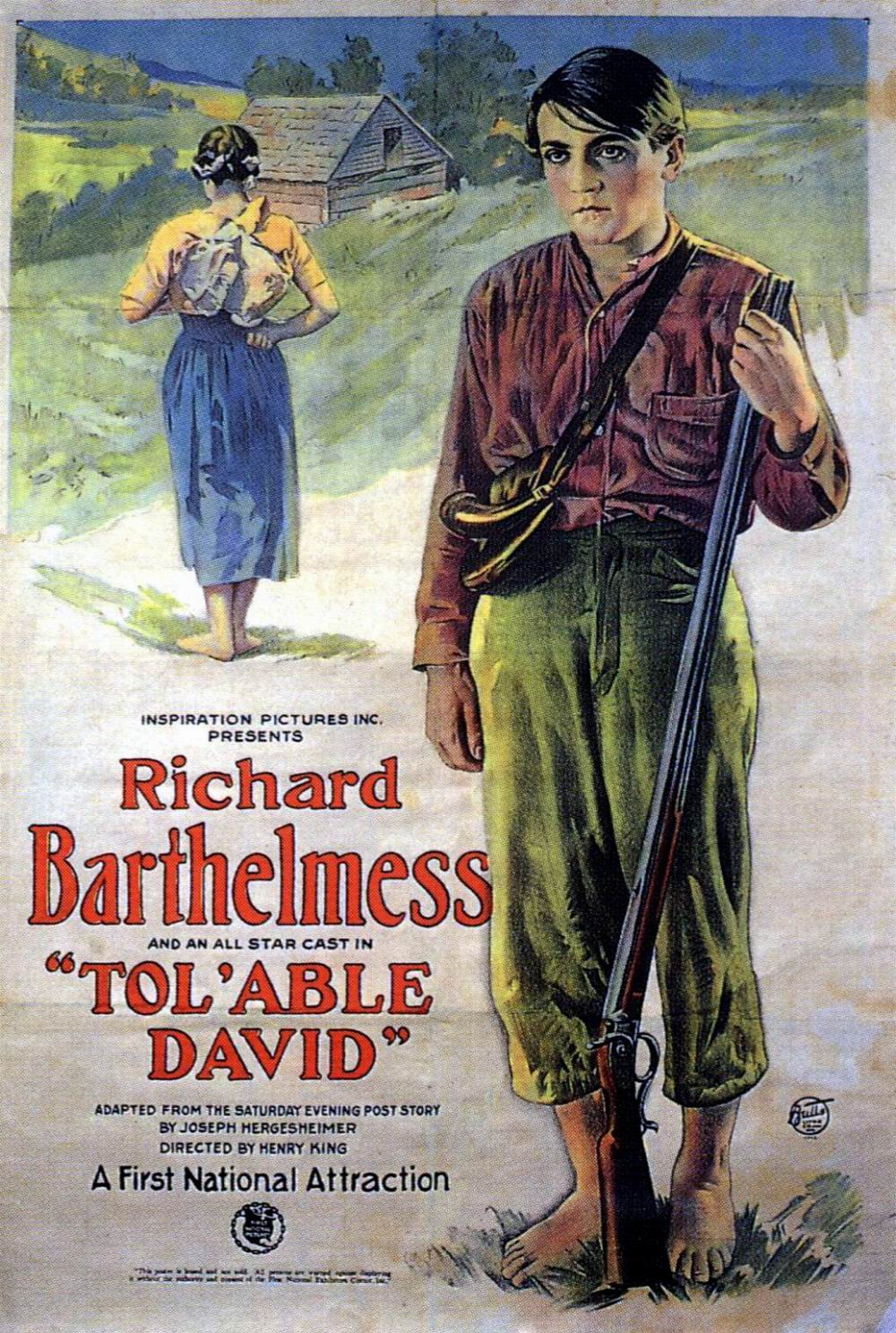
Tol'able David starring Richard Barthelmess.

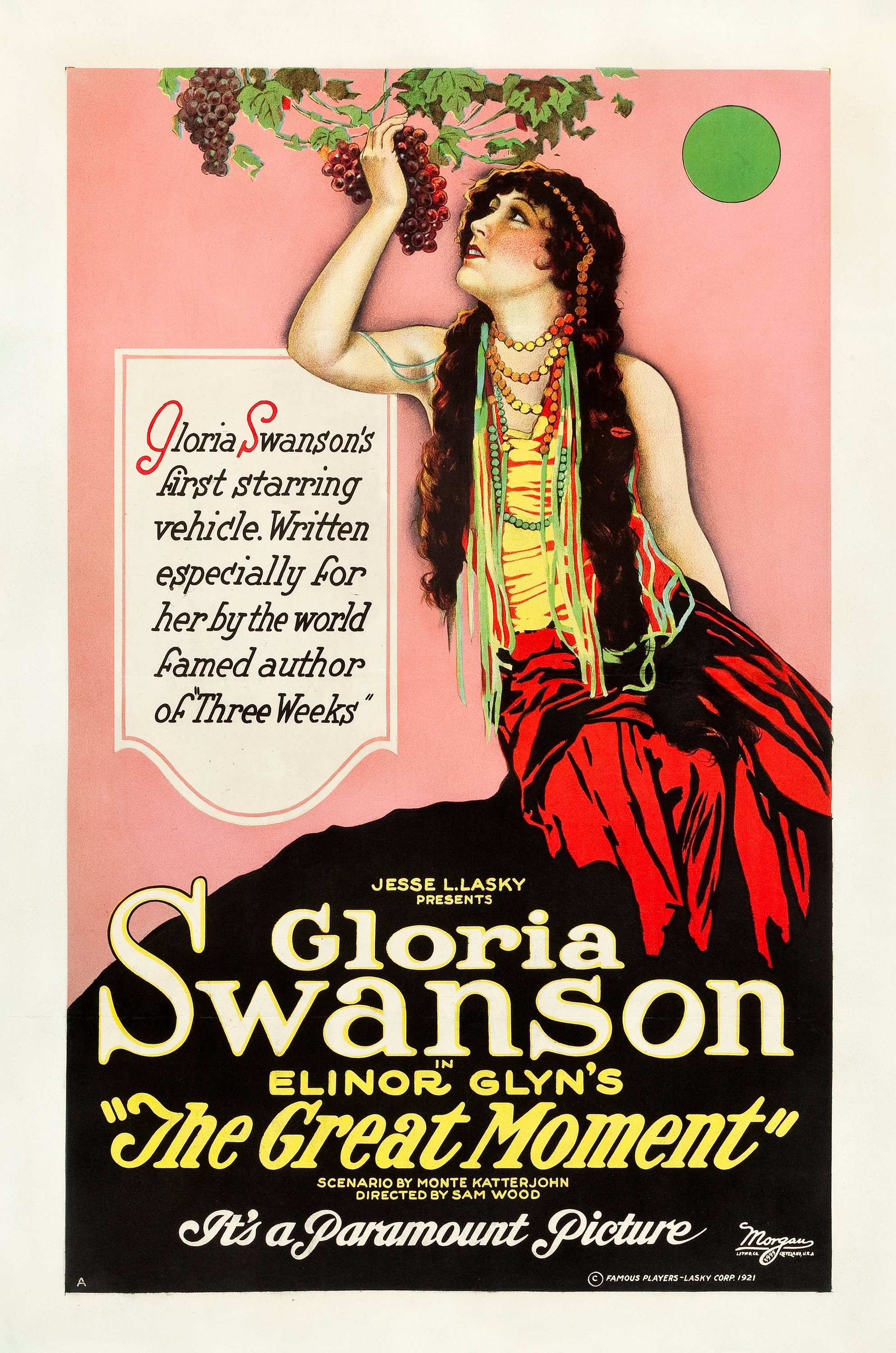
The Great Moment starring Gloria Swanson.

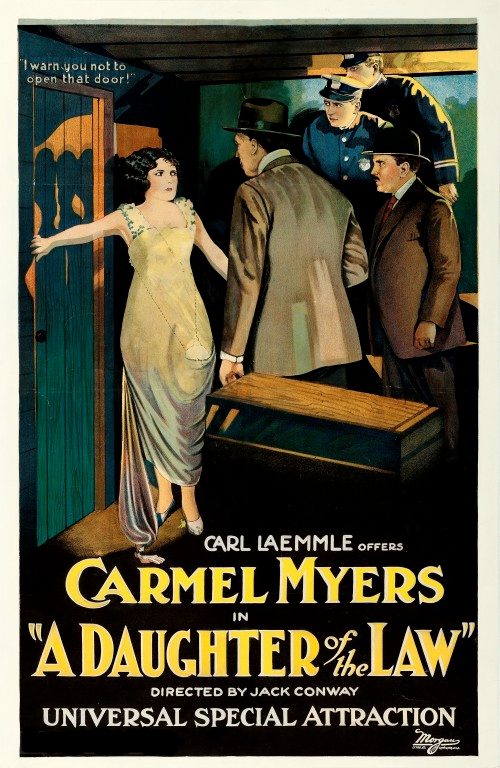
A Daughter of the Law starring Carmel Myers.

Around 800 American feature films were released in 1921. In the years before, during and since World War I several major studios based in Hollywood had come to dominate American film production including Paramount, Fox, Universal, Vitagraph, Goldwyn, First National and United Artists. American-made films enjoyed great commercial success around the world and relied on an established star system.

== A–B ==
Title	Director	Cast	Genre	Notes
The Ace of Hearts	Wallace Worsley	Lon Chaney, Leatrice Joy, John Bowers, Hardee Kirkland, Raymond Hatton	Crime Drama	Goldwyn
Across the Divide	John Holloway	Rex Ballard, Rosemary Theby	Western	Associated Exhibitors
Action	John Ford	Hoot Gibson, Francis Ford, Clara Horton	Western	Universal
The Affairs of Anatol	Cecil B. DeMille	Wallace Reid, Gloria Swanson, Wanda Hawley	Drama	Paramount
After Midnight	Ralph Ince	Ralph Ince, Zena Keefe, Macey Harlam	Drama	Selznick
After the Show	Scott Sidney	Jack Holt, Lila Lee, Eve Southern	Drama	Paramount
After Your Own Heart	George Marshall	Tom Mix, Ora Carew, George Hernandez	Western	Fox
Alias Ladyfingers	Bayard Veiller	Bert Lytell, Ora Carew, Frank Elliott	Comedy	Metro
All Dolled Up	Rollin S. Sturgeon	Gladys Walton, Edward Hearn, Florence Turner	Comedy	Universal
All's Fair in Love	E. Mason Hopper	Richard Dix, May Collins, Stuart Holmes	Comedy	Goldwyn
All Soul's Eve	Chester Franklin	Mary Miles Minter, Jack Holt, Carmen Phillips	Drama	Paramount
Anne of Little Smoky	Edward Connor	Winifred Westover, Dolores Cassinelli, Joe King	Drama	Playgoers
At the End of the World	Penrhyn Stanlaws	Betty Compson, Milton Sills, Mitchell Lewis	Drama	Paramount
At the Stage Door	Christy Cabanne	Billie Dove, Huntley Gordon, Miriam Battista	Romance	FBO
Bachelor Apartments	Johnnie Walker	Edward M. Favor, Bernard Nedell	Comedy	Arrow
The Bait	Maurice Tourneur	Hope Hampton, Jack McDonald, James Gordon	Crime	Paramount
Bar Nothing	Edward Sedgwick	Buck Jones, Ruth Renick, Arthur Edmund Carewe	Western	Fox
Bare Knuckles	James P. Hogan	William Russell, Mary Thurman, George Fisher	Drama	Fox
The Barricade	Christy Cabanne	William H. Strauss, Katherine Spencer, Kenneth Harlan	Drama	FBO
Be My Wife	Max Linder	Max Linder, Alta Allen, Rose Dione	Comedy	Goldwyn
Beach of Dreams	William Parke	Edith Storey, Noah Beery, Jack Curtis	Drama	FBO
Beating the Game	Victor Schertzinger	Tom Moore, Hazel Daly, DeWitt Jennings	Crime	Goldwyn
The Beautiful Gambler	William Worthington	Grace Darmond, Jack Mower, Harry von Meter	Western	Universal
The Beautiful Liar	Wallace Worsley	Katherine MacDonald, Charles Meredith, Joseph J. Dowling	Comedy	First National
Beau Revel	John Griffith Wray	Lewis Stone, Florence Vidor, Kathleen Kirkham	Drama	Paramount
Behind Masks	Frank Reicher	Dorothy Dalton, William P. Carleton, Julia Swayne Gordon	Drama	Paramount
Below the Deadline	J.P. McGowan	Lillian Biron, Bert Sprotte, Robert Anderson	Crime	Independent
Beyond	William Desmond Taylor	Ethel Clayton, Charles Meredith, Earl Schenck	Drama	Paramount
Beyond Price	J. Searle Dawley	Pearl White, Vernon Steele, Ottola Nesmith	Drama	Fox
The Big Adventure	B. Reeves Eason	B. Reeves Eason Jr., Lee Shumway, Gertrude Olmstead	Adventure	Universal
Big Game	Dallas M. Fitzgerald	May Allison, Forrest Stanley, Zeffie Tilbury	Drama	Metro
The Big Punch	John Ford	Buck Jones, Barbara Bedford, Jack Curtis	Western	Fox
Big Town Ideas	Carl Harbaugh	Eileen Percy, Laura La Plante, James Parrott	Comedy	Fox
The Big Town Round-Up	Lynn Reynolds	Tom Mix, Ora Carew, Laura La Plante	Action	Fox
Bits of Life	Marshall Neilan	Lon Chaney, Noah Beery, Sr., Anna May Wong	Drama	First National
Black Beauty	David Smith	Jean Paige, James W. Morrison, Adele Farrington	Drama	Vitagraph
The Black Panther's Cub	Emile Chautard	Florence Reed, Earle Foxe, Norman Trevor	Drama	Independent
Black Roses	Colin Campbell	Sessue Hayakawa, Myrtle Stedman, Tsuru Aoki	Crime	FBO
The Blazing Trail	Robert Thornby	Frank Mayo, Mary Philbin, Lillian Rich	Drama	Universal
Blind Hearts	Rowland V. Lee	Hobart Bosworth, Madge Bellamy, Wade Boteler	Drama	Associated Producers
The Blot	Phillips Smalley, Lois Weber	Claire Windsor, Louis Calhern, Margaret McWade	Melodrama	Independent
The Blushing Bride	Jules Furthman	Eileen Percy, Herbert Heyes, Philo McCullough	Comedy	Fox
Bob Hampton of Placer	Marshall Neilan	James Kirkwood Sr., Wesley Barry, Marjorie Daw	Drama	First National
Boys Will Be Boys	Clarence G. Badger	Will Rogers, Irene Rich, Sidney Ainsworth	Comedy	Goldwyn
The Breaking Point	Paul Scardon	Bessie Barriscale, Walter McGrail, Ethel Grey Terry	Drama	Hodkinson
Brewster's Millions	Joseph Henabery	Fatty Arbuckle, Betty Ross Clarke, Marian Skinner	Comedy	Paramount
Bring Him In	Robert Ensminger, Earle Williams	Earle Williams, Fritzi Ridgeway, Ernest Van Pelt	Drama	Vitagraph
Broadway Buckaroo	Phil Goldstone	William Fairbanks, Marion Aye, Fred Burns	Western	Independent
A Broken Doll	Allan Dwan	Monte Blue, Mary Thurman, Mary Jane Irving	Drama	Associated Producers
The Broken Spur	Ben F. Wilson	Jack Hoxie, Evelyn Nelson, Marin Sais	Western	Arrow
The Bronze Bell	James W. Horne	Courtenay Foote, John Davidson, Claire Du Brey	Drama	Paramount
Bucking the Line	Carl Harbaugh	Maurice 'Lefty' Flynn, Molly Malone, Kathryn McGuire	Drama	Fox
Bucking the Tiger	Henry Kolker	Conway Tearle, Winifred Westover, Gladden James	Drama	Selznick
Bunty Pulls the Strings	Reginald Barker	Leatrice Joy, Russell Simpson, Raymond Hatton	Comedy	Goldwyn
Buried Treasure	George D. Baker	Marion Davies, Norman Kerry, Anders Randolf	Adventure	Paramount
Burn 'Em Up Barnes	George Beranger	Johnny Hines, Edmund Breese, George Fawcett	Comedy	Independent
The Butterfly Girl	John Gorman	Marjorie Daw, Fritzi Brunette, King Baggot	Drama	Pathe Exchange

== C–D ==
Title	Director	Cast	Genre	Notes
The Call of the North	Joseph Henabery	Jack Holt, Madge Bellamy, Noah Beery	Drama	Paramount ǀ The Canadian one of recent (1921 film) ǀǀ Joseph Henaberry, Rudolph Valentino ǀǀ First National
Camille	Ray C. Smallwood	Alla Nazimova, Rudolph Valentino, Patsy Ruth Miller	Drama	Metro
Cappy Ricks	Tom Forman	Thomas Meighan, Agnes Ayres, John St. Polis	Adventure	Paramount
The Case of Becky	Chester M. Franklin	Constance Binney, Montagu Love, Glenn Hunter	Drama	Paramount
The Cave Girl	Joseph J. Franz	Teddie Gerard, Charles Meredith, Boris Karloff	Drama	First National
A Certain Rich Man	Howard Hickman	Carl Gantvoort, Claire Adams, Robert McKim	Drama	Selznick
Charge It	Harry Garson	Clara Kimball Young, Herbert Rawlinson, Betty Blythe	Drama	Independent
The Charm School	James Cruze	Wallace Reid, Lila Lee, Adele Farrington	Comedy	Paramount
The Charming Deceiver	George L. Sargent	Alice Calhoun, Charles Kent, Robert Gaillard	Drama	Vitagraph
Cheated Hearts	Hobart Henley	Herbert Rawlinson, Warner Baxter, Marjorie Daw	Drama	Universal
Cheated Love	King Baggot	Carmel Myers, Allan Forrest, John Davidson	Drama	Universal
The Cheater Reformed	Scott R. Dunlap	William Russell, Seena Owen, Sam De Grasse	Drama	Fox
The Chicken in the Case	Victor Heerman	Owen Moore, Teddy Sampson, Katherine Perry	Comedy	Selznick
Chickens	Jack Nelson	Douglas MacLean, Gladys George, Claire McDowell	Comedy	Paramount
The Child Thou Gavest Me	John M. Stahl	Barbara Castleton, Adele Farrington, Winter Hall	Drama	First National
Children of the Night	John Francis Dillon	William Russell, Ruth Renick, Maurice 'Lefty' Flynn	Comedy	Fox
Chivalrous Charley	Robert Ellis	Eugene O'Brien, George Fawcett, Huntley Gordon	Comedy	Selznick
Cinderella of the Hills	Howard M. Mitchell	Barbara Bedford, Carl Miller, Clarence Wilson	Drama	Fox
The City of Silent Men	Tom Forman	Thomas Meighan, Lois Wilson, Kate Bruce	Drama	Paramount
Clay Dollars	George Archainbaud	Eugene O'Brien, Ruth Dwyer, Frank Currier	Drama	Selznick
Closed Doors	Gustav von Seyffertitz	Alice Calhoun, Harry C. Browne	Drama	Vitagraph
Coincidence	Chester Withey	Robert Harron, June Walker, Bradley Barker	Comedy	Metro
Cold Steel	Sherwood MacDonald	J.P. McGowan, Kathleen Clifford, Stanhope Wheatcroft	Action	FBO
Colorado	B. Reeves Eason	Frank Mayo, Charles Newton, Gloria Hope	Western	Universal
Colorado Pluck	Jules Furthman	William Russell, Margaret Livingston, George Fisher	Drama	Fox
Conceit	Burton George	William B. Davidson, Hedda Hopper, Charles K. Gerrard	Drama	Selznick
The Concert	Victor Schertzinger	Lewis Stone, Myrtle Stedman, Raymond Hatton	Comedy	Goldwyn
Conflict	Stuart Paton	Priscilla Dean, Edward Connelly, Hector V. Sarno	Drama	Universal
A Connecticut Yankee	Emmett J. Flynn	Harry Myers, Pauline Starke, Rosemary Theby	Adventure	Fox
The Conquering Power	Rex Ingram	Rudolph Valentino, Alice Terry, Ralph Lewis	Romance Drama	Metro
The Conquest of Canaan	Roy William Neill	Thomas Meighan, Doris Kenyon, Diana Allen	Drama	Paramount
Courage	Sidney Franklin	Naomi Childers, Sam De Grasse, Adolphe Menjou	Drama	First National
Cousin Kate	Lucille McVey	Alice Joyce, Gilbert Emery, Leslie Austin	Drama	Vitagraph
Crazy to Marry	James Cruze	Fatty Arbuckle, Lila Lee, Edwin Stevens	Comedy	Paramount
The Crimson Cross	George Everett	Edward Langford, Marian Swayne, Eulalie Jensen	Drama	Independent
Crossing Trails	Clifford Smith	Pete Morrison, Esther Ralston, Lew Meehan	Western	Independent
The Cup of Life	Rowland V. Lee	Hobart Bosworth, Madge Bellamy, Niles Welch	Drama	Associated Producers
Cupid's Brand	Rowland V. Lee	Jack Hoxie, Wilbur McGaugh, Mignon Anderson	Western	Arrow
Cyclone Bliss	Francis Ford	Jack Hoxie, Evelyn Nelson, Fred Kohler	Western	Arrow
Danger Ahead	Rollin S. Sturgeon	Mary Philbin, James W. Morrison, Jack Mower	Drama	Universal
Dangerous Curve Ahead	E. Mason Hopper	Helene Chadwick, Richard Dix, Maurice 'Lefty' Flynn	Comedy	Goldwyn
The Dangerous Moment	Marcel De Sano	Carmel Myers, Lule Warrenton, George Regas	Drama	Universal
Dangerous Paths	Duke Worne	Neva Gerber, Ben F. Wilson, Edith Stayart	Drama	Arrow
A Daughter of the Law	Jack Conway	Carmel Myers, John B. O'Brien, Fred Kohler	Crime	Universal
Dawn of the East	Edward H. Griffith	Alice Brady, Kenneth Harlan, Michio Itō	Drama	Paramount
Dead or Alive	Dell Henderson	Jack Hoxie, Joseph W. Girard, Marin Sais	Western	Arrow
Desert Blossoms	Arthur Rosson	William Russell, Helen Ferguson, Wilbur Higby	Drama	Fox
Desperate Trails	John Ford	Harry Carey, Irene Rich, Barbara La Marr	Western	Universal
Desperate Youth	Harry B. Harris	Gladys Walton, J. Farrell MacDonald, Louis Willoughby	Drama	Universal
Devil Dog Dawson	Karl R. Coolidge	Jack Hoxie, Helene Rosson, Evelyn Selbie	Western	Arrow
The Devil	James Young	George Arliss, Lucy Cotton, Sylvia Breamer	Drama	Pathé Exchange
The Devil Within	Bernard J. Durning	Dustin Farnum, Virginia Valli, Nigel De Brulier	Adventure	Fox
Devotion	Burton George	Hazel Dawn, Elmo Lincoln, Violet Palmer	Drama	Associated Producers
Diamonds Adrift	Chester Bennett	Earle Williams, Beatrice Burnham, Otis Harlan	Comedy	Vitagraph
Diane of Star Hollow	Oliver L. Sellers	Bernard Durning, Evelyn Greeley, George Majeroni	Drama	Independent
Discontented Wives	J.P. McGowan	Fritzi Brunette, Andrew Waldron, J.P. McGowan	Drama	Playgoers
Disraeli	Henry Kolker	George Arliss, Florence Arliss, Reginald Denny	Biography	United Artists
A Divorce of Convenience	Robert Ellis	Owen Moore, Katherine Perry, Nita Naldi	Comedy	Selznick
The Dollar-a-Year Man	James Cruze	Fatty Arbuckle, Lila Lee, Winifred Greenwood	Comedy	Paramount
Don't Call Me Little Girl	Joseph Henabery	Mary Miles Minter, Ruth Stonehouse, Jerome Patrick	Comedy	Paramount
Don't Neglect Your Wife	Wallace Worsley	Mabel Julienne Scott, Lewis Stone, Charles Clary	Drama	Goldwyn
Don't Tell Everything	Sam Wood	Gloria Swanson, Wallace Reid, Dorothy Cumming	Drama	Paramount
The Double O	Roy Clements	Jack Hoxie, Steve Clemente, Evelyn Nelson	Western	Arrow
Doubling for Romeo	Clarence G. Badger	Will Rogers, Sylvia Breamer, Raymond Hatton	Comedy	Goldwyn
Dr. Jim	William Worthington	Frank Mayo, Claire Windsor, Robert Anderson	Drama	Universal
Dream Street	D. W. Griffith	Carol Dempster, Charles Emmett Mack, Ralph Graves	Drama	United Artists
Ducks and Drakes	Maurice S. Campbell	Bebe Daniels, Jack Holt, Mayme Kelso	Comedy	Paramount
The Duke of Chimney Butte	Frank Borzage	Fred Stone, Vola Vale, Josie Sedgwick	Western	FBO
Dynamite Allen	Dell Henderson	George Walsh, Edna Murphy, Dorothy Allen	Adventure	Fox

== E–F ==
Title	Director	Cast	Genre	Notes
East Lynne	Hugo Ballin	Edward Earle, Mabel Ballin, Henry G. Sell	Drama	Hodkinson
The Easy Road	Tom Forman	Thomas Meighan, Gladys George, Lila Lee	Drama	Paramount
Eden and Return	William A. Seiter	Doris May, Emmett King, Margaret Livingston	Comedy	FBO
The Education of Elizabeth	Edward Dillon	Billie Burke, Lumsden Hare, Edith Sharpe	Comedy	Paramount
Enchantment	Robert G. Vignola	Marion Davies, Forrest Stanley, Corinne Barker	Comedy	Paramount
Ever Since Eve	Howard M. Mitchell	Shirley Mason, Herbert Heyes, Ethel Lynne	Drama	Fox
Everyman's Price	Burton L. King	Grace Darling, Bud Geary, Nita Naldi	Comedy	Independent
Everything for Sale	Frank O'Connor	May McAvoy, A. Edward Sutherland, Kathlyn Williams	Drama	Paramount
Exit the Vamp	Frank Urson	Ethel Clayton, T. Roy Barnes, Fontaine La Rue	Comedy	Paramount
Experience	George Fitzmaurice	Richard Barthelmess, Reginald Denny, Marjorie Daw	Drama	Paramount
Extravagance	Phil Rosen	May Allison, Robert Edeson, Theodore Von Eltz	Drama	Metro
The Face of the World	Irvin Willat	Edward Hearn, Barbara Bedford, Lloyd Whitlock	Drama	Hodkinson
The Faith Healer	George Melford	Milton Sills, Ann Forrest, Fontaine La Rue	Drama	Paramount
False Kisses	Paul Scardon	Miss DuPont, Pat O'Malley, Lloyd Whitlock	Drama	Universal
The Family Closet	John B. O'Brien	Holmes Herbert, Alice Mann, Kempton Greene	Mystery	Playgoers
Father Tom	John B. O'Brien	Thomas A. Wise, May Kitson	Drama	Playgoers
Fearless Dick	Park Frame	Dick Hatton, Henry Herbert, Otto Lederer	Western	Independent
Fifty Candles	Irvin Willat	Bertram Grassby, Marjorie Daw, Ruth King	Mystery	Hodkinson
The Fighter	Henry Kolker	Conway Tearle, Winifred Westover, Arthur Housman	Drama	Selznick
The Fighting Lover	Fred LeRoy Granville	Frank Mayo, Elinor Hancock, Gertrude Olmstead	Comedy	Universal
Fightin' Mad	Joseph Franz	William Desmond, Virginia Brown Faire, Rosemary Theby	Western	Metro
Fine Feathers	Fred Sittenham	Eugene Pallette, Claire Whitney, Warburton Gamble	Drama	Metro
The Fire Cat	Norman Dawn	Edith Roberts, Walter Long, Beatrice Dominguez	Drama	Universal
The Fire Eater	B. Reeves Eason	Hoot Gibson, Louise Lorraine, Carmen Phillips	Western	Universal
The First Born	Colin Campbell	Sessue Hayakawa, Helen Jerome Eddy, Marie Pavis	Drama	FBO
First Love	Maurice S. Campbell	Constance Binney, Warner Baxter, Betty Schade	Comedy	Paramount
Flower of the North	David Smith	Henry B. Walthall, Pauline Starke, Harry Northrup	Western	Vitagraph
Fool's Paradise	Cecil B. DeMille	Conrad Nagel, Mildred Harris, Theodore Kosloff, Baby Peggy	Romance	Paramount
The Foolish Age	William A. Seiter	Doris May, Hallam Cooley, Otis Harlan	Comedy	FBO
The Foolish Matrons	Maurice Tourneur; Clarence Brown	Hobart Bosworth, Doris May, Kathleen Kirkham	Drama	Associated Producers
Footfalls	Charles Brabin	Tyrone Power Sr., Estelle Taylor, Gladden James	Mystery	Fox
Footlights	John S. Robertson	Elsie Ferguson, Reginald Denny, Marc McDermott	Drama	Paramount
For Those We Love	Arthur Rosson	Betty Compson, Lon Chaney, Richard Rosson	Drama	Goldwyn
Forbidden Fruit	Cecil B. DeMille	Agnes Ayres, Clarence Burton, Theodore Roberts	Drama	Paramount
Forbidden Love	Philip Van Loan	Creighton Hale, George MacQuarrie, Marguerite Clayton	Drama	Playgoers
Forever	George Fitzmaurice	Wallace Reid, Elsie Ferguson, Montagu Love	Romance	Paramount
The Forgotten Woman	Park Frame	Pauline Starke, J. Frank Glendon, Allan Forrest	Drama	Independent
The Four Horsemen of the Apocalypse	Rex Ingram	Rudolph Valentino, Virginia Warwick, Josef Swickard	Drama	Metro
The Fox	Robert Thornby	Harry Carey, Gertrude Claire, Betty Ross Clarke	Western	Universal
The Freeze-Out	John Ford	Harry Carey, Helen Ferguson, Charles Le Moyne	Western	Universal
From the Ground Up	E. Mason Hopper	Tom Moore, Helene Chadwick, DeWitt Jennings	Comedy	Goldwyn
Frontier of the Stars	Charles Maigne	Thomas Meighan, Faire Binney, Alphonse Ethier	Drama	Paramount

== G–H ==
Title	Director	Cast	Genre	Notes
Garments of Truth	George D. Baker	Gareth Hughes, Ethel Grandin, John Steppling	Comedy	Metro
Gasoline Gus	James Cruze	Fatty Arbuckle, Lila Lee, Charles Ogle	Comedy	Paramount
Get-Rich-Quick Wallingford	Frank Borzage	Sam Hardy, Norman Kerry, Doris Kenyon	Comedy	Paramount
Get Your Man	William K. Howard	Buck Jones, Beatrice Burnham, Helene Rosson	Drama	Fox
Ghost City	William Bertram	Helen Holmes, Anne Schaefer, Leo D. Maloney	Western	Independent
The Ghost in the Garret	F. Richard Jones	Dorothy Gish, Ray Grey, Frank Hagney	Comedy	Paramount
Gilded Lies	William P.S. Earle	Eugene O'Brien, Martha Mansfield, Frank Whitson	Drama	Selznick
The Gilded Lily	Robert Z. Leonard	Mae Marsh, Lowell Sherman, Jason Robards Sr.	Drama	Paramount
The Girl from God's Country	Nell Shipman	Nell Shipman, Edmund Burns, George Berrell	Drama	Independent
The Girl from Nowhere	George Archainbaud	Elaine Hammerstein, William B. Davidson, Huntley Gordon	Drama	Selznick
The Girl from Porcupine	Dell Henderson	Faire Binney, William Collier Jr., Jack Drumier	Western	Arrow
The Girl in the Taxi	Lloyd Ingraham	Flora Parker DeHaven, Carter DeHaven, King Baggot	Comedy	First National
The Girl with the Jazz Heart	Lawrence C. Windom	Madge Kennedy, Joe King, Pierre Gendron	Comedy	Goldwyn
Go Straight	William Worthington	Frank Mayo, Cora Drew, Lillian Rich	Drama	Universal
God's Country and the Law	Sidney Olcott	Gladys Leslie, William H. Tooker, Cesare Gravina	Drama	Arrow
The Golden Snare	David Hartford	Lewis Stone, Wallace Beery, Melbourne MacDowell	Drama	First National
Good Women	Louis J. Gasnier	Rosemary Theby, Hamilton Revelle, Earl Schenck	Drama	FBO
The Great Adventure	Kenneth Webb	Lionel Barrymore, Doris Rankin, Octavia Broske	Comedy	First National
The Great Impersonation	George Melford	James Kirkwood, Ann Forrest, Winter Hall	Drama	Paramount
The Great Moment	Sam Wood	Gloria Swanson, Alec B. Francis, Milton Sills	Drama	Paramount
The Greater Claim	Wesley Ruggles	Alice Lake, Jack Dougherty, Edward Cecil	Drama	Metro
The Greater Profit	William Worthington	Edith Storey, Pell Trenton, Lloyd Bacon	Crime	FBO
Greater Than Love	Fred Niblo	Louise Glaum, Margaret Gibson, Eve Southern	Drama	Associated Producers
The Grim Comedian	Frank Lloyd	Jack Holt, Gloria Hope, Laura La Varnie	Drama	Goldwyn
Guile of Women	Clarence G. Badger	Will Rogers, Bert Sprotte, Mary Warren	Comedy	Goldwyn
A Guilty Conscience	David Smith	Antonio Moreno, Betty Francisco, Harry von Meter	Drama	Vitagraph
Habit	Edwin Carewe	Mildred Harris, Ethel Grey Terry, Walter McGrail	Drana	First National
Hail the Woman	John Griffith Wray	Florence Vidor, Lloyd Hughes, Theodore Roberts	Drama	Associated Producers
Handcuffs or Kisses	George Archainbaud	Elaine Hammerstein, Julia Swayne Gordon, Robert Ellis	Drama	Selznick
Hands Off!	George Marshall	Tom Mix, Pauline Curley, Charles K. French	Western	Fox
Headin' North	Charles Bartlett	Pete Morrison, Gladys Cooper, Dorothy Dickson	Western	Arrow
The Heart Line	Frederick A. Thomson	Leah Baird, Jerome Patrick, Frederick Vroom	Drama	Pathe Exchange
The Heart of Maryland	Tom Terriss	Catherine Calvert, Crane Wilbur, Ben Lyon	Drama	Vitagraph
The Heart of the North	Harry Revier	Roy Stewart, Louise Lovely, Harry von Meter	Western	Independent
A Heart to Let	Edward Dillon	Justine Johnstone, Harrison Ford, Marcia Harris	Drama	Paramount
Hearts and Masks	William A. Seiter	Elinor Field, Lloyd Bacon, Francis McDonald	Romantic comedy	FBO
Hearts of Youth	Millard Webb	Harold Goodwin, Glen Cavender, George Fisher	Drama	Fox
Hearts Up	Val Paul	Harry Carey, Arthur Millett, Charles Le Moyne	Western	Universal
Heedless Moths	Robert Z. Leonard	Jane Thomas, Holmes Herbert, Hedda Hopper	Drama	Independent
The Hell Diggers	Frank Urson	Wallace Reid, Lois Wilson, Lucien Littlefield	Drama	Paramount
Her Face Value	Thomas N. Heffron	Wanda Hawley, Lincoln Plumer, Richard Rosson	Drama	Paramount
Her Lord and Master	Edward José	Alice Joyce, Holmes Herbert, Frank Sheridan	Comedy	Vitagraph
Her Mad Bargain	Edwin Carewe	Anita Stewart, Helen Raymond, Adele Farrington	Drama	First National
Her Social Value	Jerome Storm	Katherine MacDonald, Roy Stewart, Bertram Grassby	Drama	First National
Her Sturdy Oak	Thomas N. Heffron	Wanda Hawley, Walter Hiers, Sylvia Ashton	Comedy	Paramount
Her Winning Way	Joseph Henabery	Mary Miles Minter, Gaston Glass, Helen Dunbar	Comedy	Paramount
Hickville to Broadway	Carl Harbaugh	Eileen Percy, William Scott, Rosemary Theby	Comedy	Fox
High Heels	Lee Kohlmar	Gladys Walton, Frederik Vogeding, William Worthington	Drama	Universal
The Highest Bidder	Wallace Worsley	Madge Kennedy, Lionel Atwill, Vernon Steele	Drama	Goldwyn
The Highest Law	Ralph Ince	Ralph Ince, Robert Agnew, Margaret Seddon	Drama	Selznick
Hills of Hate	Ben F. Wilson	Jack Hoxie, Wilbur McGaugh, Evelyn Nelson	Western	Arrow
His Brother's Keeper	Wilfrid North	Martha Mansfield, L. Rogers Lytton, Gretchen Hartman	Crime	Independent
His Greatest Sacrifice	J. Gordon Edwards	William Farnum, Alice Fleming, Evelyn Greeley	Drama	Fox
His Nibs	Gregory La Cava	Chic Sale, Colleen Moore, Joseph Dowling	Comedy	FBO
Hold Your Horses	E. Mason Hopper	Tom Moore, Sylvia Ashton, Naomi Childers	Comedy	Goldwyn
The Hole in the Wall	Maxwell Karger	Alice Lake, Allan Forrest, Frank Brownlee	Drama	Metro
The Home Stretch	Jack Nelson	Douglas MacLean, Beatrice Burnham, Margaret Livingston	Drama	Paramount
Home Stuff	Albert H. Kelley	Viola Dana, Tom Gallery, Josephine Crowell	Comedy	Metro
The House That Jazz Built	Penrhyn Stanlaws	Wanda Hawley, Forrest Stanley, Gladys George	Drama	Paramount
The Hunch	George D. Baker	Gareth Hughes, Ethel Grandin, John Steppling	Comedy	Metro
Hush	Harry Garson	Clara Kimball Young, J. Frank Glendon, Kathlyn Williams	Drama	Independent
Hush Money	Charles Maigne	Alice Brady, George Fawcett, Larry Wheat	Drama	Paramount

== I–J ==
Title	Director	Cast	Genre	Notes
I Am Guilty	Jack Nelson	Louise Glaum, Mahlon Hamilton, Claire Du Brey	Drama	Associated Producers
Idle Hands	Frank Reicher	Gail Kane, Thurston Hall, J. Herbert Frank	Drama	Independent
The Idle Rich	Maxwell Karger	Bert Lytell, Virginia Valli, John Davidson	Comedy	Metro
The Idol of the North	Roy William Neill	Dorothy Dalton, Edwin August, Riley Hatch	Drama	Paramount
If Women Only Knew	Edward H. Griffith	Robert Gordon, Madelyn Clare, Virginia Lee	Drama	FBO
The Infamous Miss Revell	Dallas M. Fitzgerald	Alice Lake, Cullen Landis, Herbert Standing	Mystery	Metro
The Inner Chamber	Edward José	Alice Joyce, Jane Jennings, Holmes Herbert	Drama	Vitagraph
The Innocent Cheat	Ben F. Wilson	Roy Stewart, Sidney De Gray, Rhea Mitchell	Drama	Arrow
The Inside of the Cup	Albert Capellani	William P. Carleton, David Torrence, Edith Hallor	Drama	Paramount
The Invisible Fear	Edwin Carewe	Anita Stewart, Walter McGrail, Allan Forrest	Mystery	First National
The Invisible Power	Frank Lloyd	House Peters, Irene Rich, DeWitt Jennings	Crime	Goldwyn
The Iron Trail	Roy William Neill	Wyndham Standing, Thurston Hall, Reginald Denny	Adventure	United Artists
Is Life Worth Living?	Alan Crosland	Eugene O'Brien, Winifred Westover, Arthur Housman	Drama	Selznick
It Can Be Done	David Smith	Earle Williams, Elinor Fair, Henry A. Barrows	Comedy	Vitagraph
It Isn't Being Done This Season	George L. Sargent	Corinne Griffith, Catherine Calvert, Harry C. Browne	Drama	Vitagraph
Jackie	John Ford	Shirley Mason, William Scott, Harry Carter	Drama	Fox
Jane Eyre	Hugo Ballin	Norman Trevor, Mabel Ballin, Crauford Kent	Drama	Hodkinson
Jim the Penman	Kenneth Webb	Lionel Barrymore, Doris Rankin, Gladys Leslie	Crime drama	First National
The Jolt	George Marshall	Edna Murphy, Johnnie Walker, Raymond McKee	Drama	Fox
The Journey's End	Hugo Ballin	Mabel Ballin, George Bancroft, Wyndham Standing	Drama	Hodkinson
The Jucklins	George Melford	Winter Hall, Mabel Julienne Scott, Monte Blue	Drama	Paramount
Judge Her Not	George Edwardes-Hall	Jack Livingston, Pauline Curley, Harry von Meter	Western	Independent
Just Around the Corner	Frances Marion	Margaret Seddon, Lewis Sargent, Sigrid Holmquist	Drama	Paramount
Just Outside the Door	George Irving	Edith Hallor, Betty Blythe, J. Barney Sherry	Drama	Selznick

== K–L ==
Title	Director	Cast	Genre	Notes
Kazan	Bertram Bracken	Jane Novak, Ben Deeley, Edwin Wallock	Western	Independent
Keeping Up with Lizzie	Lloyd Ingraham	Enid Bennett, Edward Hearn, Otis Harlan	Comedy	Hodkinson
The Kentuckians	Charles Maigne	Monte Blue, Wilfred Lytell, Diana Allen	Drama	Paramount
The Kid	Charlie Chaplin	Charlie Chaplin, Jackie Coogan, Edna Purviance	Comedy drama	First National
The Killer	Jack Conway, Howard C. Hickman	Claire Adams, Frankie Lee, Frank Campeau	Western	Pathe Exchange
King, Queen, Joker	Sydney Chaplin	Sydney Chaplin, Lottie MacPherson	Comedy	Paramount
The Kingfisher's Roost	Louis Chaudet, Paul Hurst	Neal Hart, William Quinn, Ben Corbett	Western	Independent
A Kiss in Time	Thomas N. Heffron	Wanda Hawley, T. Roy Barnes, Walter Hiers	Comedy	Paramount
The Kiss	Jack Conway	Carmel Myers, George Periolat, J.P. Lockney	Drama	Universal
A Knight of the West	Bob McKenzie	Olin Francis, Estelle Harrison, Billy Franey	Comedy	Independent
Know Your Men	Charles Giblyn	Pearl White, Harry C. Browne, Wilfred Lytell	Drama	Fox
Ladies Must Live	George Loane Tucker	Betty Compson, Mahlon Hamilton, Leatrice Joy	Drama	Paramount
The Lady from Longacre	George Marshall	William Russell, Mary Thurman, Mathilde Brundage	Drama	Fox
The Lamplighter	Howard M. Mitchell	Shirley Mason, Raymond McKee, Philo McCullough	Drama	Fox
The Land of Hope	Edward H. Griffith	Alice Brady, Jason Robards Sr., Larry Wheat	Drama	Paramount
The Last Card	Bayard Veiller	May Allison, Alan Roscoe, Irene Hunt	Drama	Metro
The Last Door	William P.S. Earle	Eugene O'Brien, Nita Naldi, Charles Craig	Mystery	Selznick
The Last Trail	Emmett J. Flynn	Maurice 'Lefty' Flynn, Eva Novak, Wallace Beery	Western	Fox
Lavender and Old Lace	Lloyd Ingraham	Marguerite Snow, Seena Owen, Louis Bennison	Drama	Hodkinson
The Leech	Herbert Hancock	Alexander Hall, Claire Whitney	Drama	Selznick
Lessons in Love	Chester Withey	Constance Talmadge, Flora Finch, James Harrison	Comedy	First National
Life's Darn Funny	Dallas M. Fitzgerald	Viola Dana, Gareth Hughes, Kathleen O'Connor	Comedy	Metro
Life's Greatest Question	Harry Revier	Roy Stewart, Louise Lovely, Harry von Meter	Drama	Independent
The Light in the Clearing	T. Hayes Hunter	Eugenie Besserer, Clara Horton, A. Edward Sutherland	Drama	Hodkinson
The Little Clown	Thomas N. Heffron	Mary Miles Minter, Jack Mulhall, Neely Edwards	Comedy	Paramount
The Little Fool	Phil Rosen	Milton Sills, Nigel Barrie, Ora Carew	Drama	Metro
Little Italy	George Terwilliger	Alice Brady, Norman Kerry, George Fawcett	Comedy	Paramount
Little Lord Fauntleroy	Jack Pickford, Alfred E. Green	Mary Pickford, Claude Gillingwater, Joseph J. Dowling	Comedy drama	United Artists
The Little Minister	Penrhyn Stanlaws	Betty Compson, George Hackathorne, Nigel Barrie	Drama	Paramount
Little Miss Hawkshaw	Carl Harbaugh	Eileen Percy, Eric Mayne, Donald Keith	Drama	Fox
Live and Let Live	Christy Cabanne	Harriet Hammond, George Nichols, Dulcie Cooper	Drama	FBO
Live Wires	Edward Sedgwick	Johnnie Walker, Edna Murphy, Alberta Lee	Drama	Fox
The Lost Romance	William C. deMille	Lois Wilson, Jack Holt, Conrad Nagel	Drama	Paramount
Lotus Blossom	James B. Leong, Francis J. Grandon	Lady Tsen Mei, Tully Marshall, Noah Beery	Drama	Independent
The Lotus Eater	Marshall Neilan	John Barrymore, Colleen Moore, Anna Q. Nilsson	Drama	First National
The Love Charm	Thomas N. Heffron	Wanda Hawley, Mae Busch, Sylvia Ashton	Comedy	Paramount
Love, Hate and a Woman	Charles Horan	Grace Davison, Ralph Kellard, Julia Swayne Gordon	Drama	Arrow
The Love Light	Frances Marion	Mary Pickford, Raymond Bloomer, Fred Thomson	Drama	United Artists
Love Never Dies	King Vidor	Lloyd Hughes, Madge Bellamy, Joseph Bennett	Drama	Associated Producers
Love's Penalty	John Gilbert	Hope Hampton, Percy Marmont, Virginia Valli	Drama	First National
Love's Redemption	Albert Parker	Norma Talmadge, Harrison Ford, Montagu Love	Drama	First National
The Love Special	Frank Urson	Wallace Reid, Agnes Ayres, Theodore Roberts	Drama	Paramount
Lovetime	Howard M. Mitchell	Shirley Mason, Raymond McKee, Edwin B. Tilton	Drama	Fox
Lucky Carson	Wilfrid North	Earle Williams, Betty Ross Clarke, Gertrude Astor	Drama	Vitagraph
The Lure of Egypt	Howard C. Hickman	Robert McKim, Claire Adams, Joseph J. Dowling	Drama	Pathe Exchange
The Lure of Jade	Colin Campbell	Pauline Frederick, Thomas Holding, Arthur Rankin	Drama	FBO
The Lure of Youth	Phil Rosen	Cleo Madison, Gareth Hughes, William Conklin	Romance	Metro
Luring Lips	King Baggot	Edith Roberts, Ramsey Wallace, William Welsh	Drama	Universal
Lying Lips	John Griffith Wray	House Peters, Florence Vidor, Joseph Kilgour	Drama	Associated Producers

== M–N ==
Title	Director	Cast	Genre	Notes
The Mad Marriage	Rollin S. Sturgeon	Carmel Myers, Jane Starr, Nola Luxford	Drama	Universal
Made in Heaven	Victor Schertzinger	Tom Moore, Helene Chadwick, Molly Malone	Comedy	Goldwyn
The Magic Cup	John S. Robertson	Constance Binney, Vincent Coleman, Blanche Craig	Adventure	Independent
The Magnificent Brute	Robert Thornby	Frank Mayo, Dorothy Devore, Percy Challenger	Drama	Universal
Maid of the West	Philo McCullough	Eileen Percy, William Scott, Jack Brammall	Drama	Fox
Making the Grade	Fred J. Butler	David Butler, Helen Ferguson, Lillian Lawrence	Comedy	Independent
Mama's Affair	Victor Fleming	Constance Talmadge, Effie Shannon, Kenneth Harlan	Romantic comedy	First National
The Man from Lost River	Frank Lloyd	House Peters, Fritzi Brunette, Allan Forrest	Drama	Goldwyn
A Man of Stone	George Archainbaud	Conway Tearle, Martha Mansfield, Betty Howe	Drama	Selznick
The Man of the Forest	Howard Hickman	Carl Gantvoort, Claire Adams, Robert McKim	Western	Hodkinson
The Man Tamer	Harry B. Harris	Gladys Walton, Rex De Rosselli, William Welsh	Drama	Universal
The Man Trackers	Edward A. Kull	George Larkin, Josephine Hill, Albert J. Smith	Western	Universal
The Man Who	Maxwell Karger	Bert Lytell, Lucy Cotton, Virginia Valli	Comedy	Metro
Man, Woman & Marriage	Allen Holubar	Dorothy Phillips, Ralph Lewis, Margaret Mann	Drama	First National
A Man's Home	Ralph Ince	Harry T. Morey, Kathlyn Williams, Faire Binney	Drama	Selznick
The March Hare	Maurice S. Campbell	Bebe Daniels, Helen Jerome Eddy, Sidney Bracey	Comedy	Paramount
The Marriage of William Ashe	Edward Sloman	May Allison, Wyndham Standing, Zeffie Tilbury	Drama	Metro
Marry the Poor Girl	Lloyd Ingraham	Carter DeHaven, Flora Parker DeHaven	Comedy	Associated Exhibitors
The Mask	Bertram Bracken	Jack Holt, Hedda Nova, Michael D. Moore	Mystery	Independent
The Match-Breaker	Dallas M. Fitzgerald	Viola Dana, Jack Perrin, Edward Jobson	Comedy	Metro
The Matrimonial Web	Edward José	Alice Calhoun, Joseph Striker, Riley Hatch	Drama	Vitagraph
A Midnight Bell	Charles Ray	Charles Ray, Doris Pawn, Donald MacDonald	Comedy	First National
Midsummer Madness	William C. deMille	Jack Holt, Conrad Nagel, Lois Wilson	Drama	Paramount
The Millionaire	Jack Conway	Herbert Rawlinson, Bert Roach, William Courtright	Drama	Universal
The Miracle of Manhattan	George Archainbaud	Elaine Hammerstein, Matt Moore, Leonora von Ottinger	Drama	Selznick
Miss 139	B. A. Rolfe	Diana Allen, Marc McDermott, Eugene Strong	Crime	Independent
Miss Lulu Bett	William C. deMille	Lois Wilson, Milton Sills, Helen Ferguson	Comedy	Paramount
The Mistress of Shenstone	Henry King	Pauline Frederick, Roy Stewart, Emmett King	Romance	FBO
Molly O	F. Richard Jones	Mabel Normand, George Nichols, Anna Dodge	Comedy	First National
The Money Maniac	Léonce Perret	Robert Elliott, Lucy Fox, Henry G. Sell	Drama	Pathe Exchange
Montana Bill	Phil Goldstone	William Fairbanks, Maryon Aye, Robert Kortman	Western	Independent
Moonlight and Honeysuckle	Joseph Henabery	Mary Miles Minter, Monte Blue, Willard Louis	Romance	Paramount
Moonlight Follies	King Baggot	Marie Prevost, Lionel Belmore, George Fisher	Comedy	Universal
Moral Fibre	Webster Campbell	Corinne Griffith, Catherine Calvert, Harry C. Browne	Drama	Vitagraph
Morals	William Desmond Taylor	May McAvoy, William P. Carleton, Marian Skinner	Drama	Paramount
Mother Eternal	Ivan Abramson	Vivian Martin, Thurston Hall, Earl Metcalfe	Drama	Independent
The Mother Heart	Howard M. Mitchell	Shirley Mason, Raymond McKee, Edwin B. Tilton	Drama	Fox
Mother O' Mine	Fred Niblo	Lloyd Hughes, Betty Ross Clarke, Betty Blythe	Drama	Associated Producers
A Motion to Adjourn	Roy Clements	Harry L. Rattenberry, Roy Stewart, Marjorie Daw	Comedy	Arrow
The Mountain Woman	Charles Giblyn	Pearl White, Richard Travers, Corliss Giles	Drama	Fox
My Boy	Victor Heerman, Albert Austin	Jackie Coogan, Mathilde Brundage, Claude Gillingwater	Drama	First National
My Lady Friends	Lloyd Ingraham	Carter DeHaven, Flora Parker DeHaven, Thomas G. Lingham	Comedy	First National
My Lady's Latchkey	Edwin Carewe	Katherine MacDonald, Edmund Lowe, Claire Du Brey	Mystery	First National
The Mysterious Rider	Benjamin B. Hampton	Robert McKim, Claire Adams, Carl Gantvoort	Western	Hodkinson
The New Disciple	Oliver L. Sellers	Pell Trenton, Margaret Mann, Alfred Allen	Drama	Independent
The Night Horsemen	Lynn Reynolds	Tom Mix, Charles K. French, Bert Sprotte	Western	Fox
No Defense	William Duncan	William Duncan, Edith Johnson, Jack Richardson	Drama	Vitagraph
No Man's Woman	Leo D. Maloney	Helen Gibson, Edward Coxen, Aggie Herring	Western	Independent
No Woman Knows	Tod Browning	Max Davidson, Snitz Edwards, Josef Swickard	Drama	Universal
Nobody	Roland West	Jewel Carmen, William B. Davidson, Kenneth Harlan	Mystery	First National
Nobody's Fool	King Baggot	Marie Prevost, Harry C. Myers	Comedy	Universal
Nobody's Kid	Howard Hickman	Mae Marsh, Kathleen Kirkham, Anne Schaefer	Drama	FBO
Not Guilty	Sidney Franklin	Sylvia Breamer, Richard Dix, Molly Malone	Mystery	First National
The Nut	Theodore Reed	Douglas Fairbanks, Marguerite De La Motte, William Lowery	Comedy	United Artists

== O–Q ==
Title	Director	Cast	Genre	Notes
O'Malley of the Mounted	Lambert Hillyer	William S. Hart, Eva Novak, Leo Willis	Western	Paramount
The Oath	Raoul Walsh	Miriam Cooper, Conway Tearle, Anna Q. Nilsson	Drama	First National
The Offenders	Fenwick L. Holmes	Margery Wilson, Percy Helton	Drama	Independent
The Off-Shore Pirate	Dallas M. Fitzgerald	Viola Dana, Jack Mulhall, Edward Jobson	Comedy	Metro
Oh Mary Be Careful	Arthur Ashley	Madge Kennedy, Marguerite Marsh, Harry C. Myers	Comedy	Independent
The Old Nest	Reginald Barker	Dwight Crittendon, Mary Alden, Nick Cogley	Drama	Goldwyn
The Old Swimmin' Hole	Joseph De Grasse	Charles Ray, Laura La Plante, James Gordon	Comedy	First National
Oliver Twist, Jr.	Millard Webb	Harold Goodwin, George Nichols, Clarence Wilson	Drama	Fox
One a Minute	Jack Nelson	Douglas MacLean, Victor Potel, Frances Raymond	Comedy	Paramount
One Man in a Million	George Beban	George Beban, Helen Jerome Eddy, Irene Rich	Drama	FBO
The One-Man Trail	Bernard Durning	Buck Jones, Beatrice Burnham, Helene Rosson	Western	Fox
One Wild Week	Maurice S. Campbell	Bebe Daniels, Mayme Kelso, Herbert Standing	Comedy	Paramount
Opened Shutters	William Worthington	Edith Roberts, Josef Swickard, Joseph Singleton	Drama	Universal
Orphans of the Storm	D. W. Griffith	Lillian Gish, Dorothy Gish, Joseph Schildkraut	Melodrama	United Artists
The Other Woman	Edward Sloman	Jerome Patrick, Jane Novak, Helen Jerome Eddy	Drama	Hodkinson
Out of the Chorus	Herbert Blache	Alice Brady, Vernon Steele, Charles K. Gerrard	Drama	Paramount
Outlawed	Alan James	Bill Patton, Buck Connors, Joe Rickson	Western	Independent
The Outside Woman	Sam Wood	Wanda Hawley, Sidney Bracey, Rosita Marstini	Comedy	Paramount
Over the Wire	Wesley Ruggles	Alice Lake, Al Roscoe, Alan Hale	Drama	Metro
Pardon My French	Sidney Olcott	Vivian Martin, Ralph Yearsley, Grace Van Studdiford	Comedy	Goldwyn
A Parisian Scandal	George L. Cox	George Periolat, Lillian Lawrence, Marie Prevost	Comedy	Universal
Partners of Fate	Bernard Durning	Louise Lovely, William Scott, Rosemary Theby	Drama	Fox
Partners of the Tide	L.V. Jefferson	Jack Perrin, Daisy Jefferson, Gertrude Norman	Drama	Hodkinson
Passing Through	William A. Seiter	Douglas MacLean, Madge Bellamy, Otto Hoffman	Comedy	Paramount
Passion Flower	Herbert Brenon	Norma Talmadge, Courtenay Foote, Eulalie Jensen	Drama	First National
Passion Fruit	John Ince	Doraldina, Edward Earle, Stuart Holmes	Romance	Metro
The Passionate Pilgrim	Robert G. Vignola	Matt Moore, Mary Newcomb, Julia Swayne Gordon	Drama	Paramount
Patsy	John McDermott	Zasu Pitts, Marjorie Daw, Wallace Beery	Comedy	Independent
Paying the Piper	George Fitzmaurice	Dorothy Dickson, Alma Tell, George Fawcett	Drama	Paramount
Payment Guaranteed	George L. Cox	Margarita Fischer, Hayward Mack, Harry Lonsdale	Drama	Pathe Exchange
Peck's Bad Boy	Sam Wood	Jackie Coogan, Wheeler Oakman, Doris May	Comedy	First National
Peggy Puts It Over	Gustav von Seyffertitz	Alice Calhoun, Edward Langford, Leslie Stowe	Comedy	Vitagraph
A Perfect Crime	Allan Dwan	Monte Blue, Jacqueline Logan, Carole Lombard	Comedy	Associated Producers
Penny of Top Hill Trail	Arthur Berthelet	Bessie Love, Wheeler Oakman, Raymond Cannon	Comedy Drama	Independent
Perjury	Harry F. Millarde	William Farnum, Sally Crute, Alice Mann	Drama	Fox
Pilgrims of the Night	Edward Sloman	Lewis Stone, Rubye De Remer, William V. Mong	Drama	Associated Producers
Play Square	William K. Howard	Johnnie Walker, Edna Murphy, Laura La Plante	Drama	Fox
Playing with Fire	Dallas M. Fitzgerald	Gladys Walton, Kathryn McGuire, Eddie Gribbon	Comedy	Universal
The Plaything of Broadway	John Francis Dillon	Justine Johnstone, Crauford Kent, Edwards Davis	Drama	Paramount
Playthings of Destiny	Edwin Carewe	Anita Stewart, Herbert Rawlinson, Walter McGrail	Romance	First National
Poor, Dear Margaret Kirby	William P.S. Earle	Elaine Hammerstein, Helen Lindroth, Warburton Gamble	Drama	Selznick
A Poor Relation	Clarence G. Badger	Will Rogers, Sylvia Breamer, Wallace MacDonald	Comedy	Goldwyn
The Poverty of Riches	Reginald Barker	Richard Dix, Leatrice Joy, Louise Lovely	Drama	Goldwyn
The Power Within	Lem F. Kennedy	William H. Tooker, Nellie Parker Spaulding, Dorothy Allen	Drama	Pathe Exchange
The Price of Possession	Hugh Ford	Ethel Clayton, Rockliffe Fellowes, Reginald Denny	Drama	Paramount
The Primal Law	Bernard J. Durning	Dustin Farnum, Mary Thurman, Philo McCullough	Western	Fox
A Prince There Was	Tom Forman	Thomas Meighan, Mildred Harris, Nigel Barrie	Drama	Paramount
Princess Jones	Gustav von Seyffertitz	Alice Calhoun, Vincent Coleman, Helen Dubois	Comedy	Vitagraph
Prisoners of Love	Arthur Rosson	Betty Compson, Ralph Lewis, Claire McDowell	Romance	Goldwyn
A Private Scandal	Chester M. Franklin	May McAvoy, Ralph Lewis, Kathlyn Williams	Drama	Paramount
Proxies	George D. Baker	Norman Kerry, Zena Keefe, William H. Tooker	Crime	Paramount
Puppets of Fate	Dallas M. Fitzgerald	Viola Dana, Francis McDonald, Jackie Saunders	Drama	Metro
The Queen of Sheba	J. Gordon Edwards	Betty Blythe, Fritz Leiber, Claire de Lorez	Drama	Fox
Queenie	Howard M. Mitchell	Shirley Mason, George O'Hara, Adolphe Menjou	Drama	Fox

== R–S ==
Title	Director	Cast	Genre	Notes
The Rage of Paris	Jack Conway	Miss DuPont, Elinor Hancock, Jack Perrin	Drama	Universal
The Raiders	Nate Watt	Franklyn Farnum, Bud Osborne, Claire Windsor	Action	Independent
Rainbow	Edward José	Alice Calhoun, Charles Kent, George Lessey	Drama	Vitagraph
Reckless Wives	Alador Prince	Leslie Austin, Jane Thomas	Drama	Independent
The Recoil	Milburn Morante	George Chesebro, Evelyn Nelson, Milburn Morante	Western	Independent
Red Courage	B. Reeves Eason	Hoot Gibson, Molly Malone, Joseph W. Girard	Western	Universal
Remorseless Love	Ralph Ince	Elaine Hammerstein, Niles Welch	Drama	Selznick
Reputation	Stuart Paton	Priscilla Dean, Niles Welch, Harry von Meter	Drama	Universal
Rich Girl, Poor Girl	Harry B. Harris	Gladys Walton, Antrim Short, Wadsworth Harris	Drama	Universal
The Rich Slave	Romaine Fielding	Mabel Taliaferro, Joseph W. Smiley, Romaine Fielding	Drama	Independent
The Rider of the King Log	Harry O. Hoyt	Frank Sheridan, Richard Travers, Arthur Donaldson	Action	Pathe Exchange
A Ridin' Romeo	George Marshall	Tom Mix, Rhea Mitchell, Eugenie Forde	Western	Fox
Riding with Death	Jacques Jaccard	Buck Jones, Betty Francisco, Jack Mower	Western	Fox
The Right Way	Sidney Olcott	Sidney D'Albrook, Edwards Davis, Vivienne Osborne	Drama	Independent
Rip Van Winkle	Edward Ludwig	Thomas Jefferson, Milla Davenport, Gertrude Messinger	Fantasy	Hodkinson
The Road Demon	Lynn Reynolds	Tom Mix, Claire Anderson, Charles K. French	Action	Fox
The Road to London	Eugene Mullin	Bryant Washburn, Saba Raleigh, Joan Morgan	Drama	Associated Exhibitors
Roads of Destiny	Frank Lloyd	Pauline Frederick, John Bowers, Jane Novak	Drama	Goldwyn
The Roof Tree	John Francis Dillon	William Russell, Florence Deshon, Sylvia Breamer	Drama	Fox
Room and Board	Alan Crosland	Constance Binney, Thomas Carrigan, Arthur Housman	Drama	Paramount
The Rough Diamond	Edward Sedgwick	Tom Mix, Eva Novak, Hector V. Sarno	Western	Fox
The Rowdy	David Kirkland	Rex De Rosselli, Anna Dodge, Gladys Walton	Drama	Universal
R.S.V.P.	Charles Ray	Charles Ray, Harry Myers, Jean Calhoun	Comedy	First National
The Ruse of the Rattler	J.P. McGowan	J.P. McGowan, Lillian Rich, Dorothea Wolbert	Western	Playgoers
Sacred and Profane Love	William Desmond Taylor	Elsie Ferguson, Conrad Nagel, Helen Dunbar	Drama	Paramount
The Sage Hen	Edgar Lewis	Gladys Brockwell, Wallace MacDonald	Western	Pathe Exchange
A Sailor-Made Man	Fred C. Newmeyer	Harold Lloyd, Mildred Davis, Noah Young	Comedy	Associated Exhibitors
Salvage	Henry King	Pauline Frederick, Ralph Lewis, Milton Sills	Drama	FBO
Salvation Nell	Kenneth Webb	Pauline Starke, Joe King, Gypsy O'Brien	Drama	First National
The Scarab Ring	Edward José	Alice Joyce, Joe King, Eddie Phillips	Mystery	Vitagraph
School Days	William Nigh	Wesley Barry, George Lessey, Nellie Parker Spaulding	Comedy	Warner Bros.
Scrambled Wives	Edward H. Griffith	Marguerite Clark, Pierre Gendron, Virginia Lee	Comedy	First National
Scrap Iron	Charles Ray	Charles Ray, Lydia Knott, Vera Steadman	Drama	First National
The Sea Lion	Rowland V. Lee	Hobart Bosworth, Bessie Love, Emory Johnson	Adventure	Associated Producers
The Secret of the Hills	Chester Bennett	Antonio Moreno, Kingsley Benedict, Elita Proctor Otis	Mystery	Vitagraph
See My Lawyer	Al Christie	T. Roy Barnes, Grace Darmond, Lloyd Whitlock	Comedy	FBO
Sentimental Tommy	John S. Robertson	Gareth Hughes, George Fawcett, May McAvoy	Drama	Paramount
Serenade	Raoul Walsh	Miriam Cooper, George Walsh, Rosita Marstini	Drama	First National
The Servant in the House	Jack Conway	Jean Hersholt, Jack Curtis, Claire Anderson	Drama	FBO
Seven Years Bad Luck	Max Linder	Max Linder, Alta Allen, Ralph McCullough	Comedy	FBO
The Shadow	J. Charles Davis	Muriel Ostriche, Walter Miller	Drama	Independent
Shadows of Conscience	John P. McCarthy	Russell Simpson, Barbara Tennant, Gertrude Olmstead	Western	Independent
Shadows of the West	Paul Hurst	Hedda Nova, Ben Corbett, Arthur Jasmine	Western	Independent
Sham	Thomas N. Heffron	Ethel Clayton, Theodore Roberts, Sylvia Ashton	Romance	Paramount
Shame	Emmett J. Flynn	John Gilbert, Anna May Wong, Doris Pawn	Drama	Fox
Shams of Society	Thomas B. Walsh	Barbara Castleton, Montagu Love, Julia Swayne Gordon	Drama	FBO
The Shark Master	Fred LeRoy Granville	Frank Mayo, Doris Deane, Herbert Fortier	Drama	Universal
The Sheik	George Melford	Rudolph Valentino, Rosemary Theby, Agnes Ayres	Drama, Adventure	Paramount
Sheltered Daughters	Edward Dillon	Justine Johnstone, Riley Hatch, Warner Baxter	Comedy	Paramount
The Sheriff of Hope Eternal	Ben F. Wilson	Jack Hoxie, Marin Sais, Joseph W. Girard	Western	Arrow
A Shocking Night	Eddie Lyons, Lee Moran	Eddie Lyons, Lee Moran, Alta Allen	Comedy	Universal
Short Skirts	Harry B. Harris	Gladys Walton, Ena Gregory, Jack Mower	Drama	Universal
The Sign on the Door	Herbert Brenon	Norma Talmadge, Charles Richman, Lew Cody	Drama	First National
The Silent Call	Laurence Trimble	John Bowers, Kathryn McGuire, William Dyer	Adventure	First National
Silent Years	Louis J. Gasnier	Rose Dione, Tully Marshall, George A. McDaniel	Drama	FBO
The Silver Car	David Smith	Earle Williams, Kathryn Adams, Eric Mayne	Crime	Vitagraph
The Silver Lining	Roland West	Coit Albertson, Jewel Carmen, Leslie Austin	Drama	Metro
The Sin of Martha Queed	Allan Dwan	Mary Thurman, Joseph J. Dowling, Eugenie Besserer	Drama	Associated Exhibitors
Singing River	Charles Giblyn	William Russell, Vola Vale, Clark Comstock	Western	Fox
The Single Track	Webster Campbell	Corinne Griffith, Richard Travers, Charles Kent	Drama	Vitagraph
Skirts	Hampton Del Ruth	Clyde Cook, Chester Conklin, Polly Moran	Comedy	Fox
The Sky Pilot	King Vidor	John Bowers, Colleen Moore, David Butler	Drama	First National
A Small Town Idol	Mack Sennett	Ben Turpin, James Finlayson, Phyllis Haver	Comedy	Associated Producers
The Smart Sex	Fred LeRoy Granville	Eva Novak, Margaret Mann	Comedy	Universal
The Snob	Sam Wood	Wanda Hawley, Walter Hiers, Sylvia Ashton	Comedy	Paramount
Snowblind	Reginald Barker	Russell Simpson, Mary Alden, Pauline Starke	Drama	Goldwyn
Society Secrets	Leo McCarey	Eva Novak, Gertrude Claire, Clarissa Selwynne	Comedy	Universal
Society Snobs	Hobart Henley	Conway Tearle, Ida Darling, Huntley Gordon	Comedy	Selznick
The Son of Wallingford	George Randolph Chester, Lillian Josephine Chester	Wilfrid North, Tom Gallery, Antrim Short	Comedy	Vitagraph
Sowing the Wind	John M. Stahl	Anita Stewart, James Morrison, Myrtle Stedman	Drama	First National
The Speed Girl	Maurice S. Campbell	Bebe Daniels, Theodore von Eltz, Frank Elliott	Comedy	Paramount
The Spenders	Jack Conway	Claire Adams, Robert McKim, Joseph J. Dowling	Comedy	Pathe Exchange
The Stampede	Francis Ford	Texas Guinan, Francis Ford, Fred Kohler	Western	Independent
Steelheart	William Duncan	William Duncan, Edith Johnson, Jack Curtis	Western	Vitagraph
The Sting of the Lash	Henry King	Pauline Frederick, Clyde Fillmore, Lawson Butt	Drama	FBO
Straight from Paris	Harry Garson	Clara Kimball Young, Bertram Grassby, Betty Francisco	Comedy	Independent
Straight from the Shoulder	Bernard J. Durning	Buck Jones, Helen Ferguson, Kid McCoy	Western	Fox
Straight Is the Way	Robert G. Vignola	Matt Moore, Mabel Bert, Gladys Leslie	Comedy	Paramount
Stranger Than Fiction	J.A. Barry	Katherine MacDonald, Wesley Barry, Wade Boteler	Drama	First National
Stardust	Hobart Henley	Hope Hampton, James Rennie, George Humbert	Drama	First National
The Struggle	Otto Lederer	Franklyn Farnum, Edwin Wallock, Bud Osborne	Western	Independent
Such a Little Queen	George Fawcett	Constance Binney, Vincent Coleman, Frank Losee	Drama	Paramount
Sunset Jones	George L. Cox	Charles Clary, James Gordon, Irene Rich	Western	Pathe Exchange
Sure Fire	John Ford	Hoot Gibson, Molly Malone, Fritzi Brunette	Western	Universal
Suspicious Wives	John M. Stahl	Henry Herbert, Mollie King, Ethel Grey Terry	Drama	World
The Swamp	Arthur Berthelet	Sessue Hayakawa, Bessie Love, Lillian Langdon	Drama	FBO

== T ==
Title	Director	Cast	Genre	Notes
A Tale of Two Worlds	Frank Lloyd	Leatrice Joy, Wallace Beery, E. Alyn Warren	Drama	Goldwyn
Tangled Trails	Charles Bartlett	Neal Hart, Jules Cowles, Edward Roseman	Western	Independent
The Ten Dollar Raise	Edward Sloman	William V. Mong, Marguerite De La Motte	Comedy	Associated Producers
Ten Nights in a Bar Room	Oscar Apfel	John Lowell, Kempton Greene	Drama	Arrow
That Girl Montana	Robert Thornby	Blanche Sweet, Mahlon Hamilton, Frank Lanning	Western	Pathe Exchange
Their Mutual Child	George L. Cox	Margarita Fischer, Nigel Barrie, Margaret Campbell	Comedy	Pathe Exchange
There Are No Villains	Bayard Veiller	Viola Dana, Gaston Glass, DeWitt Jennings	Crime	Metro
They Shall Pay	Martin Justice	Lottie Pickford, Allan Forrest, Paul Weigel	Drama	Associated Exhibitors
The Three Musketeers	Fred Niblo	Douglas Fairbanks, Leon Bary, Eugene Pallette	Swashbuckler	United Artists
Three Sevens	Chester Bennett	Antonio Moreno, Jean Calhoun, Emmett King	Drama	Vitagraph
Three Word Brand	Lambert Hillyer	William S. Hart, Jane Novak, Herschel Mayall	Western	Paramount
Through the Back Door	Alfred E. Green	Mary Pickford, Gertrude Astor, Wilfred Lucas	Comedy drama	United Artists
Thunderclap	Richard Stanton	Mary Carr, J. Barney Sherry, Violet Mersereau	Drama	Fox
Thunder Island	Norman Dawn	Edith Roberts, John B. O'Brien, Arthur Jasmine	Adventure	Universal
Tiger True	J.P. McGowan	Frank Mayo, Fritzi Brunette, Elinor Hancock	Mystery	Universal
To a Finish	Bernard J. Durning	Buck Jones, Helen Ferguson, G. Raymond Nye	Western	Fox
Tol'able David	Henry King	Richard Barthelmess, Gladys Hulette, Ernest Torrence	Drama	First National
The Tomboy	Carl Harbaugh	Eileen Percy, Hallam Cooley, Richard Cummings	Comedy	Fox
Too Much Married	Scott R. Dunlap	Mary Anderson, Roscoe Karns, Carmen Phillips	Comedy	Independent
Too Much Speed	Frank Urson	Wallace Reid, Agnes Ayres, Theodore Roberts	Drama	Paramount
Too Wise Wives	Lois Weber	Louis Calhern, Claire Windsor, Phillips Smalley	Drama	Paramount
The Torrent	Stuart Paton	Eva Novak, Elita Proctor Otis, Jack Perrin	Adventure	Universal
Trailin'	Lynn Reynolds	Tom Mix, Eva Novak, Bert Sprotte	Western	Fox
The Traveling Salesman	Joseph Henabery	Fatty Arbuckle, Betty Ross Clarke, Wilton Taylor	Comedy	Paramount
A Trip to Paradise	Maxwell Karger	Bert Lytell, Virginia Valli, Brinsley Shaw	Drama	Metro
Tropical Love	Ralph Ince	Ruth Clifford, Reginald Denny, Huntley Gordon	Drama	Associated Exhibitors
The Truant Husband	Thomas N. Heffron	Mahlon Hamilton, Betty Blythe, Francelia Billington	Comedy	Hodkinson
Trust Your Wife	J.A. Barry	Katherine MacDonald, Charles Richman, Mary Alden	Drama	First National
Two Minutes to Go	Charles Ray	Charles Ray, Mary Anderson, Lionel Belmore	Sports	First National
Two Weeks with Pay	Maurice S. Campbell	Bebe Daniels, Jack Mulhall, George Periolat	Comedy	Paramount

== U–V ==
Title	Director	Cast	Genre	Notes
Uncharted Seas	Wesley Ruggles	Alice Lake, Carl Gerard, Rudolph Valentino	Romance	Metro
Under the Lash	Sam Wood	Gloria Swanson, Mahlon Hamilton, Lillian Leighton	Drama	Paramount
The Unknown	Grover Jones	Richard Talmadge, Andrée Tourneur, Mark Fenton	Action	Independent
The Unknown Wife	William Worthington	Edith Roberts, Spottiswoode Aitken, Casson Ferguson	Drama	Universal
An Unwilling Hero	Clarence G. Badger	Will Rogers, Molly Malone, John Bowers	Comedy	Goldwyn
The Vengeance Trail	Charles R. Seeling	Guinn 'Big Boy' Williams, Marion Aye, Charles Arling	Western	Independent
A Virgin Paradise	J. Searle Dawley	Pearl White, Robert Elliott, Charles Sutton	Adventure	Fox
A Virginia Courtship	Frank O'Connor	May McAvoy, Alec B. Francis, Jane Keckley	Drama	Paramount
A Voice in the Dark	Frank Lloyd	Ramsey Wallace, Irene Rich, Alec B. Francis	Mystery	Goldwyn
Voices of the City	Wallace Worsley	Lon Chaney, Leatrice Joy, John Bowers	Crime	Goldwyn

== W–Z ==
Title	Director	Cast	Genre	Notes
The Wakefield Case	George Irving	Herbert Rawlinson, Charles Dalton, Jere Austin	Mystery	World
The Wallop	John Ford	Harry Carey, Charles Le Moyne, William Steele	Western	Universal
The Way of a Maid	William P. S. Earle	Elaine Hammerstein, Diana Allen, Arthur Housman	Comedy	Selznick
Wealth	William Desmond Taylor	Ethel Clayton, Herbert Rawlinson, Larry Steers	Drama	Paramount
Wedding Bells	Chester Withey	Constance Talmadge, Harrison Ford, Ida Darling	Comedy	First National
Western Hearts	Clifford Smith	Josie Sedgwick, Hal Taliaferro	Western	Independent
What Do Men Want?	Lois Weber	Claire Windsor, J. Frank Glendon, George Hackathorne	Drama	Independent
What Every Woman Knows	William C. DeMille	Lois Wilson, Conrad Nagel, Fred Huntley	Comedy drama	Paramount
What Love Will Do	William K. Howard	Edna Murphy, Johnnie Walker, Barbara Tennant	Drama	Fox
What No Man Knows	Harry Garson	Clara Kimball Young, Lowell Sherman, William P. Carleton	Drama	Independent
What Women Will Do	Edward José	Anna Q. Nilsson, Allan Forrest, Earl Metcalfe	Drama	Pathe Exchange
What's a Wife Worth?	Christy Cabanne	Casson Ferguson, Ruth Renick, Cora Drew	Drama	FBO
What's Worth While?	Lois Weber	Claire Windsor, Louis Calhern, Edwin Stevens	Drama	Paramount
What's Your Reputation Worth?	Webster Campbell	Corinne Griffith, Percy Marmont, Robert Gaillard	Drama	Vitagraph
Whatever She Wants	C.R. Wallace	Eileen Percy, Herbert Fortier, Otto Hoffman	Comedy	Fox
When We Were 21	Henry King	H. B. Warner, Claire Anderson, Christine Mayo	Drama	Pathe Exchange
Where Lights Are Low	Colin Campbell	Sessue Hayakawa, Togo Yamamoto, Goro Kino	Drama	FBO
Where Men Are Men	William Duncan	William Duncan, Edith Johnson, Harry Lonsdale	Western	Vitagraph
While the Devil Laughs	George W. Hill	Louise Lovely, William Scott, G. Raymond Nye	Crime	Fox
Whispering Shadows	Emile Chautard	Lucy Cotton, Philip Merivale, Robert Barrat	Drama	World
The Whistle	Lambert Hillyer	William S. Hart, Frank Brownlee, Myrtle Stedman	Drama	Paramount
White and Unmarried	Tom Forman	Thomas Meighan, Jacqueline Logan, Grace Darmond	Comedy	Paramount
The White Masks	George Holt	Franklyn Farnum, Virginia Lee, Shorty Hamilton	Western	Independent
White Oak	Lambert Hillyer	William S. Hart, Vola Vale, Alexander Gaden	Western	Paramount
Who Am I?	Henry Kolker	Claire Anderson, Gertrude Astor, Niles Welch	Drama	Selznick
Why Girls Leave Home	William Nigh	Anna Q. Nilsson, Julia Swayne Gordon, Corinne Barker	Drama	Warner Bros.
Why Trust Your Husband?	George Marshall	Eileen Percy, Harry Myers, Harry Dunkinson	Comedy	Fox
Wife Against Wife	Whitman Bennett	Pauline Starke, Percy Marmont, Edward Langford	Drama	First National
A Wife's Awakening	Louis J. Gasnier	William P. Carleton, Fritzi Brunette, Sam De Grasse	Drama	FBO
The Wild Goose	Albert Capellani	Mary MacLaren, Holmes Herbert, Dorothy Bernard	Drama	Paramount
Wing Toy	Howard M. Mitchell	Shirley Mason, Raymond McKee, Edward McWade	Drama	Fox
A Wise Fool	George Melford	James Kirkwood, Alice Hollister, Ann Forrest	Drama	Paramount
Wise Husbands	Frank Reicher	Gail Kane, Gladden James, Lillian Worth	Drama	Independent
The Witching Hour	William Desmond Taylor	Elliott Dexter, Winter Hall, Ruth Renick	Drama	Paramount
Without Benefit of Clergy	James Young	Nigel De Brulier, Virginia Brown Faire, Boris Karloff	Drama	Pathe Exchange
Without Limit	George D. Baker	Anna Q. Nilsson, Robert Frazer, Frank Currier	Drama	Metro
The Wolverine	William Bertram	Helen Gibson, Jack Connolly, Leo D. Maloney	Western	Independent
Wolves of the North	Norman Dawn	Herbert Heyes, Percy Challenger, Eva Novak	Western	Universal
The Woman God Changed	Robert G. Vignola	Seena Owen, Henry Sedley, Lillian Walker	Drama	Paramount
Woman's Place	Victor Fleming	Constance Talmadge, Kenneth Harlan, Florence Short	Drama	First National
Women Men Love	Samuel R. Brodsky	William Desmond, Marguerite Marsh, Martha Mansfield	Drama	Independent
The Wonderful Thing	Herbert Brenon	Norma Talmadge, Harrison Ford, Julia Hoyt	Drama	First National
Worlds Apart	Alan Crosland	Eugene O'Brien, Olive Tell, William H. Tooker	Mystery	Selznick
A Yankee Go Getter	Duke Worne	Neva Gerber, James Morrison, Joseph W. Girard	Drama	Arrow
You Find It Everywhere	Charles Horan	Catherine Calvert, Herbert Rawlinson, Macey Harlam	Comedy	Independent

== Serials ==
Title	Director	Cast	Genre	Notes
The Adventures of Tarzan	Robert F. Hill, Scott Sidney	Elmo Lincoln, Louise Lorraine, Scott Pembroke	Serial	Independent
The Avenging Arrow	W.S. Van Dyke, William Bowman	Ruth Roland, Edward Hearn	Serial	Pathe Exchange
Double Adventure	W. S. Van Dyke	Charles Hutchison, Josie Sedgwick, Carl Stockdale	Adventure	Pathé Exchange

== Shorts ==
Title	Director	Cast	Genre	Notes
$10,000 Under a Pillow	Frank Moser		Animated	
Adopting a Bear Cub	John Randolph Bray		Documentary	
The Advisor	Jack White			
Afraid of His Wife	Scott Sidney			
After the Dough	Herman C. Raymaker			
The Alarm	Robert F. Hill			
Alfalfa Love	Fred Fishback			
Among Those Present	Fred C. Newmeyer	Harold Lloyd	Comedy	
Bandits Beware	Lee Kohlmar	Hoot Gibson	Western	
Beating the Game	Lee Kohlmar	Hoot Gibson	Western	
The Boat	Edward F. Cline, Buster Keaton	Buster Keaton	Comedy	
Brownie's Baby Doll		Baby Peggy		
Brownie's Little Venus	Fred Fishback	Baby Peggy		
The Cactus Kid	Lee Kohlmar	Hoot Gibson	Western	
The Clean Up		Baby Peggy		
Crossed Clues	William James Craft	Hoot Gibson	Western	
Double Crossers		Hoot Gibson	Western	
The Driftin' Kid	Albert Russell	Hoot Gibson	Western	
The Fightin' Fury		Hoot Gibson	Western	
Get-Rich-Quick Peggy		Baby Peggy		
The Goat	Buster Keaton	Buster Keaton, Joe Roberts	Comedy	
The Haunted House	Edward F. Cline, Buster Keaton	Buster Keaton	Comedy	
The Heart of Dorean	Robert North Bradbury	Tom Santschi	Western drama	Pathé Exchange
Her Circus Man	James D. Davis	Baby Peggy, Harry Gribbon	Comedy	Universal
The High Sign	Edward F. Cline, Buster Keaton	Buster Keaton, Bartine Burkett	Comedy	
The Honor of Rameriz	Robert North Bradbury	Tom Santschi, Bessie Love, Ruth Stonehouse	Western drama	Pathé Exchange
Humor Risk	Dick Smith	Marx Brothers	Comedy	Never released
I Do	Hal Roach	Harold Lloyd	Comedy	
The Idle Class	Charles Chaplin	Charles Chaplin	Comedy	
Kickaroo		Hoot Gibson	Western	
The Kid's Pal		Baby Peggy		
Lorraine of the Timberlands	Robert North Bradbury	Tom Santschi	Western drama	Pathé Exchange
The Lucky Dog	Jess Robbins	Stan Laurel, Oliver Hardy	Comedy	1st film to feature Laurel & Hardy
The Man Who Woke Up	Lee Kohlmar	Hoot Gibson	Western	
Manhattan	Paul Strand			
Mother o' Dreams	Robert North Bradbury	Tom Santschi	Western drama	Pathé Exchange
The Movie Trail		Hoot Gibson	Western	
A Muddy Bride		Baby Peggy		
Never Weaken	Fred Newmeyer, Sam Taylor	Harold Lloyd	Comedy	
Now or Never	Fred C. Newmeyer, Hal Roach	Harold Lloyd, Mildred Davis	Comedy	
On Account		Baby Peggy		
On with the Show		Baby Peggy		
Out o' Luck		Hoot Gibson	Western	
Pals		Baby Peggy		
The Playhouse	Edward F. Cline, Buster Keaton	Buster Keaton, Virginia Fox, Joe Roberts, Edward F. Cline	Comedy	
Playmates		Baby Peggy		
The Saddle King		Hoot Gibson		
Sea Shore Shapes		Baby Peggy		
The Spirit of the Lake	Robert North Bradbury	Tom Santschi, Bessie Love, Ruth Stonehouse	Western drama	Pathé Exchange
Sweet Revenge	Edward Laemmle	Hoot Gibson	Western	
Teddy's Goat	Fred Fishback	Baby Peggy		
Third Class Male		Baby Peggy		
A Week Off		Baby Peggy		
Who Was the Man?	Lee Kohlmar	Hoot Gibson		
The Wild Wild West	Lee Kohlmar	Hoot Gibson		

== See also ==
- 1921 in the United States
