= Bandits Beware =

1921 film

- Directed by: Lee Kohlmar
- Written by: George Morgan
- Starring: Hoot Gibson
- Release date: June 25, 1921
- Running time: 20 minutes
- Country: United States
- Languages: Silent; English intertitles

Bandits Beware is a 1921 American silent Western film directed by Lee Kohlmar and featuring Hoot Gibson.

== Cast ==
- Hoot Gibson
- Charles Newton
- John Judd
- Marcella Pershing

== See also ==
- List of American films of 1921
- Hoot Gibson filmography
