= Beating the Game =

Beating the Game may refer to:

- Beating the Game (1921 Western film)
- Beating the Game (1921 crime film)
