= The Cactus Kid =

The Cactus Kid may refer to:

- The Cactus Kid (1921 film), an American short Western film
- The Cactus Kid (1930 film), a Mickey Mouse animated short film
- The Cactus Kid (1935 film), an American western film
