= Double Crossers =

1921 film

- Directed by: William James Craft
- Written by: Hoot Gibson; George H. Plympton
- Starring: Hoot Gibson
- Production company: Universal Film Manufacturing Company
- Distributed by: Universal Film Manufacturing Company
- Release date: May 21, 1921
- Running time: 20 minutes
- Country: United States
- Languages: Silent; English intertitles

Double Crossers is a 1921 American short silent Western film directed by William James Craft and featuring Hoot Gibson.

== Plot ==
This synopsis was filed at the Library of Congress with the original copyright application:

The Cactus Kid, a ranger, comes to Heldville, called by those who know it, "Hellville." Momentary anxiety is caused by his advent, but it is soon learned that he is not there on business, and almost every native is relieved. Haskins, dance hall proprietor, an evil man, has long sought the love of Mary, a young widow who lives in a poor shack with her little son. Mary's husband, who was a miner and Haskins's partner was killed two years before in a mysterious fashion and it was never learned what became of the gold he was known to have struck. The Ranger becomes acquainted with Mary when he rescues her little boy, the Kid, from a rough scene in the saloon, knocking out a man to accomplish it. The Ranger is greatly impressed with her and his calls become frequent. Haskins' jealousy is aroused.

Double-crosses Ranger

The Ranger, in order to relieve Mary's poverty, gets some old clothes from the dance hall girls and takes them to Mary, saying they belong to his wife who is too ill to sew. But Mary discovers the deception and knows the Ranger has done it from sheer kindness. When the Ranger has gone, Haskins sets upon a scheme to discredit him with Mary.

The Ranger returns at Christmas time. He takes up a collection from the boys and sends one of them to town to buy out a store for the Kid. Before many more visits on Mary, the Ranger has won her love and they become engaged. Haskins learns of this and is furious, for he wants Mary for himself. He plots against them and in this is overheard by Belle, a dance hall favorite of Haskins', who is jealous of the latter's attentions to Mary.

Belle Overhears Plot

Christmas comes and a great party is given the Kid. The rough men find their first clean joy in years in watching him go for his presents. But a cloud crosses the joy of some, when Haskins presents evidence to the effect that Mary's husband was killed by the Ranger. The latter comes to see Mary but she bars the door to him. He does not know what is wrong until Belle seeks him and tells all through jealousy. The Ranger seeks Haskins's man, who swore the Ranger was a murderer, trying to get out of town. He chases him.

Meanwhile, Haskins is again trying to win Mary. She has lost faith and seems almost ready to take him on any terms. The Kid, playing with some of his toys, loses a ball through a hole in the floor. Digging after it he unearths a cache of gold, put there by Mary's husband before his death. Haskins claims this as his, but tells Mary she can have it if she will take him. A revulsion of feeling comes over her. She refuses and they struggle for the gold. The Ranger catches the other man and forces a confession from him. He returns in time to rescue Mary from Haskins, whom he arrests for the murder of his former partner, Mary's husband. And before he takes the away to jail, the Ranger makes Mary promise that she will await his return.

== Cast ==
- Hoot Gibson as the Cactus Kid
- Marcella Pershing as Mary
- John Judd as Kidd
- Jane Talent credited as Jane Tallent, as Bell

== Censorship ==
Before Double Crossers could be exhibited in Kansas, the Kansas Board of Review required the removal of a scene where girls are drinking and smoking in a saloon.

== See also ==
- List of American films of 1921
- Hoot Gibson filmography
