= Crossed Clues =

1921 film

- Directed by: William James Craft
- Written by: J. Edward Hungerford; George Morgan
- Starring: Hoot Gibson
- Production company: Universal Film Manufacturing Company
- Distributed by: Universal Film Manufacturing Company
- Release date: April 30, 1921
- Running time: 20 minutes
- Country: United States
- Languages: Silent; English intertitles

Crossed Clues is a 1921 American short silent Western film directed by William James Craft and featuring Hoot Gibson. It was described as a "good, clean, wholesome, red-blooded" comedy-drama.

== Plot ==
According to a film magazine, "Dick McGuire is a member of the Cross K outfit and is in love with "Miss Pat," the little "boss," daughter of the owner. Pat is wearing Dick's ring, but Dick has yet to interview the "Old Man" regarding his sentiments. This interview causes Dick considerable uneasiness and he contrives to get the opinion of the outfit as to the best method of procedure. He has the misfortune of mistaking the trimmings on Pat's hat for rabbit's ears and takes a shot at them. Pat is considerably peeved but finally forgives him and accompanies him to the house, waiting outside while he interviews her father.

Dick follows the plan prescribed by one of the punchers, but it miscarries. The "Old Man" leaves no doubt as to his sentiments. "Show me one thousand dollars of yer own an' I'll give you my answer." Dick is confounded. The "Old Man" adds to Dick's discomfort as he adds, "In the meantime, you'd better hike out to the desert an' round up them strays afore they git lost." Dick is crushed and rejoins Pat. Her father's words have made Pat thoughtful. She tells Dick her father is right — that he will have to show her he can do something besides shooting rabbits before they can marry. She returns his ring and Dick feels his cup of bitterness is brimming over. While Dick is out on the desert an outlaw holds up the "Old Man" and steals the monthly payroll. Pat discovers her father locked in a closet and starts the outfit after the robber.

The outlaw comes upon Dick in a gully looking for some strays and orders him to throw up his hands. In the fight which follows the outlaw manages to escape. When Dick learns from the posse of the robbery and the reward offered for the return of the money he is more gloomy than ever and believes fate is against him. But suddenly things begin to brighten as he sees the outlaw, whose escape has been cut off by part of the posse returning in his direction. He catches him with his lasso and as his reward gets the girl with her father's consent and blessing."

== Cast ==
- Hoot Gibson as Dick McGuire
- Jacques Jaccard
- John Judd as Jenkins
- Dorothy Oliver as Pat's mother
- Marcella Pershing as Pat
- William Welsh as Collins

== Censorship ==
Before Crossed Clues could be exhibited in Kansas, the Kansas Board of Review required the removal of all scenes where the outlaw is holding people at gunpoint.

== See also ==
- List of American films of 1921
- Hoot Gibson filmography
