= Out of Luck =

Out of Luck can refer to:

- Out of Luck (1923 film), a 1923 American film
- Out of Luck (2015 film), a 2015 Nigerian film
- Out o' Luck, a 1921 American film
