= Fighting Fury (1921) =

1921 film

- Directed by: Hoot Gibson
- Written by: Arthur Henry Gooden; George Morgan
- Starring: Hoot Gibson
- Release date: February 5, 1921
- Running time: 20 minutes
- Country: United States
- Languages: Silent; English intertitles

Fighting Fury is a 1921 American short silent Western film directed by and starring Hoot Gibson. The film was announced as The Fightin' Fury in 1920. However, it had changed to Fighting Fury by release time.

== Plot ==
This plot summary was published in Wid's Daily, part of Film Daily, on February 20, 1921:

This one stars Hoot Gibson, the smiling cowboy. It might better have been titled "Jazzing Up a Western," as they have sure made the result a lot different from the average picture of this kind. The action goes on much the same as in others, but the titles, appearing every few feet, are in verse, whose only poetry is that it rhymes, kidding the picture. It produces the feeling that the whole thing is a burlesque of a western, only the action isn't overdone enough for a real burlesque. All of the titles are ridiculous, and most of them are funny, so that there will be considerable amusement in the piece, unless your audiences are western fans and demand that the stuff be taken seriously. The plot is a typical one of the type, with the villain robbing a safe in the town bank and leaving evidence to convict the hero. Gertrude Olmstead is the leading lady, and the star also directed the picture. It may prove diverting after the regular run of average short features.

== Cast ==
- Hoot Gibson
- Gertrude Olmstead
- Charles Newton
- Ben Corbett
- Otto Nelson
- John Judd

== See also ==
- List of American films of 1921
- Hoot Gibson filmography
