= The Movie Trail =

1921 film

- Directed by: Charles Thompson
- Written by: George Morgan
- Starring: Hoot Gibson
- Release date: July 9, 1921
- Running time: 20 minutes
- Country: United States
- Languages: Silent; English intertitles

The Movie Trail is a 1921 American short silent Western film directed by Charles Thompson and featuring Hoot Gibson.

== Plot ==
This plot summary is from the original copyright filing at the Library of Congress:

Dick Harris, a Texas Ranger, known as "The Cactus Kid" is on the trail of some smugglers who have been getting some diamonds across the border without paying the duty on them. The trail leads him into the vicinity where a moving picture company is at work.

Donald Lawrence, the leading man of the company uses his work as an actor to camouflage his connection with the smugglers. The "Cactus Kid's" suspicions are aroused regarding Lawrence by seeing him in a mysterious confab with a furtive looking stranger. The "Kid" waits an opportunity and searches Lawrence's room in the hotel. His efforts are futile, the only thing that arouses his curiosity is the numerous sticks of grease paint that Lawrence carries.

The company returns to the studio to complete the picture and the "Cactus Kid" goes with them as an actor in order to keep an eye on Lawrence. In the studio, a new world to the "Cactus Kid," he butts into different mishaps before he gets onto the hang of studio arrangements.

The big scene of the picture calls for Lawrence, as the leading man to cross from one building to another over a slender rope to rescue the leading woman who is trapped in the burning building. He refuses to risk his life on the "stunt" and the "Cactus Kid" is called upon to do it for him.

The "Kid" slips into Lawrence's dressing-room to use his make-up since he has none of his own.

He discovers an uncut diamond has been imbedded in the grease paint. Now he knows how the stones have been smuggled and that Lawrence is the guilty one. Lawrence discovers that his grease paint has been tampered with and also that Dick is a Texas Ranger. His momentary fear is followed by a determination to get "rid" of the "Kid" and save himself from exposure.

The stunt in the picture gives him his idea. While the "Kid" is playing onto the rope in mid-air making his way to where the leading lady is trapped at the blazing window, Lawrence makes his way unnoticed to the opposite window from which the "Kid" had started and starts to cut the rope.

The leading woman sees the dastardly act and cried out a warning to Dick. Dick sees his peril and while suspended in mid-air pulls his gun and shoots Lawrence in the hand. His plot discovered, Lawrence scrambles down from his perch and makes his getaway on a horse. Dick goes after him followed by the leading woman and others. Dick captures him in a ravine after a chase that takes them all through the studio grounds.

With his real identity known, the leading woman experiences a pang of regret at the thought of Dick leaving. Her liking for him since saving her life had deepened into something more than friendship. Dick tells her he would be glad to come back after delivering up his prisoner "if —." Needless to say, the leading woman fills in the "if" so everything ends satisfactorily.

— George Morgan, story and scenario

== Cast ==
- Hoot Gibson as the Texas Kid
- John Judd as Donald Lawrence
- Charles Newton as the Director
- Marcella Pershing as Myrtle Lee

== See also ==
- Hoot Gibson filmography
