= The Exile of Bar-K Ranch =

1915 film

- Directed by: B. Reeves Eason
- Starring: Jack Richardson
- Distributed by: Mutual Film
- Release date: August 9, 1915
- Running time: 2 reels
- Country: United States
- Languages: Silent; English intertitles

The Exile of Bar-K Ranch is a 1915 American short silent Western film directed by B. Reeves Eason.

== Cast ==
- Jack Richardson
- Charles Newton
- Walter Spencer
- Louise Lester
- Jimsy Maye
- Vivian Rich
- Roy Stewart
