= The Wild Wild West (film) =

1921 American silent Western film by Lee Kohlmar

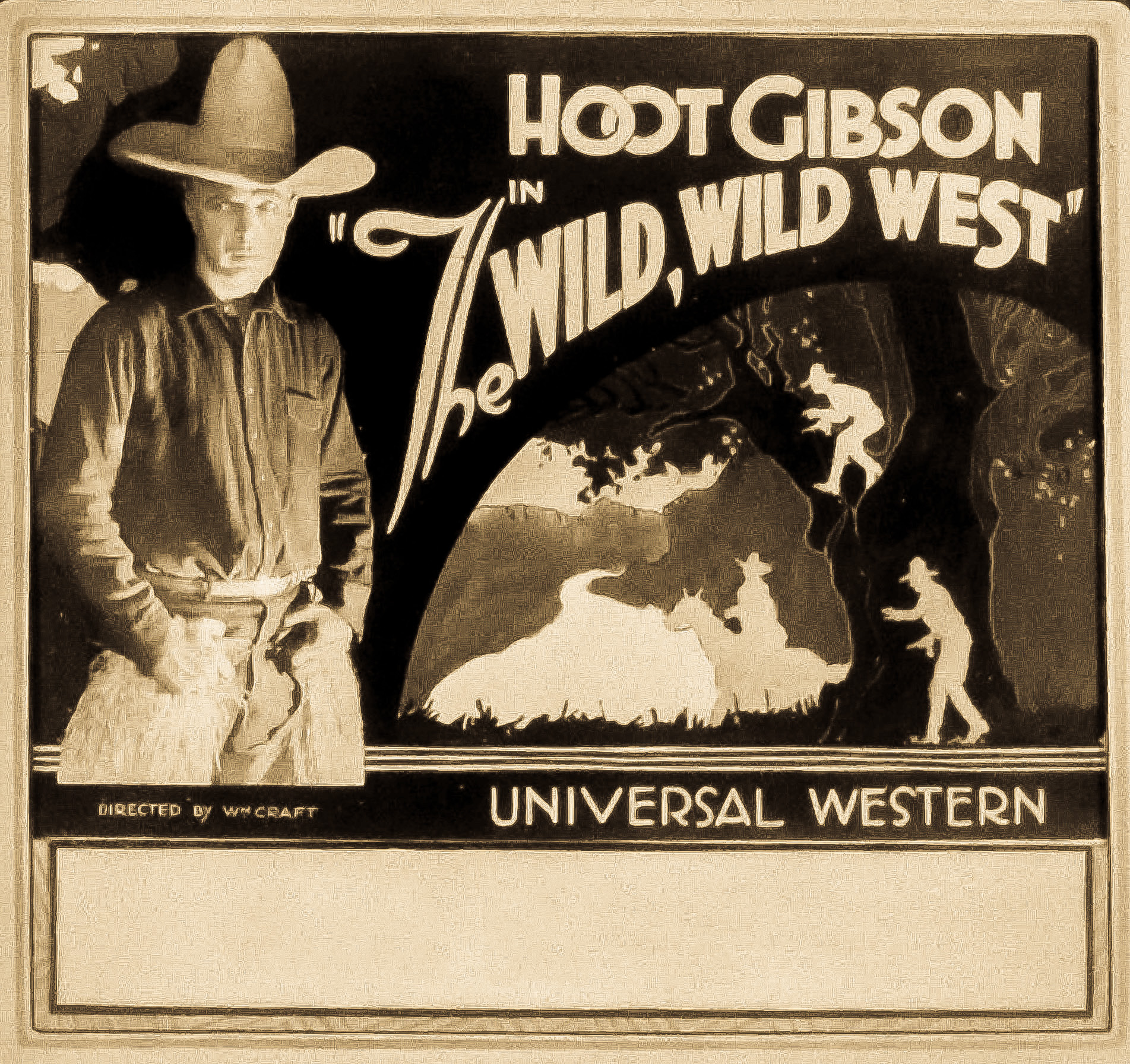
- Film poster
- Directed by: Lee Kohlmar
- Written by: George H. Plympton; Fred V. Williams
- Starring: Hoot Gibson
- Release date: June 4, 1921
- Running time: 20 minutes
- Country: United States
- Languages: Silent; English intertitles

The Wild Wild West is a 1921 American short silent Western film directed by Lee Kohlmar and featuring Hoot Gibson.

== Plot ==
This plot synopsis was filed with the original copyright application at the Library of Congress:

A band of robbers have been making a systematic series of raids on the banks of Western towns. In one of them, one of the robbers is caught, but the others get away. Jimmy Dickson, ranger, learns from the captured man that the town of Dicksonville is to be their next point of attack. Jimmy conceives the idea of going to the town as a tenderfoot. The town was named after his uncle, the Senator, so Jimmy has the latter send a telegram to Col. Thompson, mayor of the town, announcing the arrival of the tenderfoot and asking that he be shown a good time. The Colonel is afraid Jimmy will be disappointed in the town, which is an everyday, busy community, so he gets the idea of turning it into a wild west affair for one day for the tenderfoot's benefit.

Jimmy arrives and meets with a reception which first puzzles, then amuses him. But he is quick to see that the whole thing is a fake, made up for his benefit, especially when the stage is attacked by Indians and rescued by the posse from town. But Jimmy, intent on business, plays up his tenderfoot role for all it is worth.

At the saloon and gambling hall, lately an ice-cream parlor, Jimmy causes some excitement by resenting the intrusion of some bad men and shooting at their feet. As his bullets are the only real ones in the gathering, there is some anxiety until Col. Thompson gets Jimmy's gun and loads it with blanks. Jimmy dances with Betty, the Colonel's daughter, and arouses the jealousy of Reynolds, who up to this time has been her most ardent suitor.

The biggest joke of the day is to be a fake hold-up of the stage, when it will be robbed of the payroll sent to a ranch down the line. The Colonel tells Jimmy that they have been tipped off about it. Jimmy, who has seen some suspicious characters in the town, asks to be taken along.

The hold-up takes place. The colonel and the others hand over the payroll, gleefully watching Jimmy. And their amusement knows no bounds, when he leaps on a horse and goes after the bandits. But it is soon found that the robbers were the real thing, for the other fake ones arrive. And Jimmy has gone after the desperate gang with a gun full of blanks! The colonel rapidly organizes a rescue party.

In the course of his pursuit, Jimmy meets the bandits one at a time and by a ruse, overcomes each one without firing a shot. He has caught and disarmed the last one, who proves to be Reynolds, when the Colonel and the others catch up with him

Congratulations are, indeed, in order, but they fall a bit flat when Jimmy discloses the fact that he is a ranger. But he tells Betty that he will forgive them all if she will let him call on her—and she seems ready to seek his forgiveness.

== Cast ==
- Hoot Gibson as Jimmy Dickson
- Marcella Pershing as Betty Thompson
- Calvert Carter as Col. Thompson
- Jacques Jaccard
- John Judd as Reynolds
