= The Strange Case of Clara Deane =

1932 film

- Directed by: Louis J. Gasnier; Max Marcin
- Screenplay by: Max Marcin
- Starring: Wynne Gibson; Pat O'Brien; Dudley Digges; Frances Dee; George Barbier; Russell Gleason; Lee Kohlmar
- Cinematography: Henry Sharp
- Music by: John Leipold
- Production company: Paramount Pictures
- Distributed by: Paramount Pictures
- Release date: May 6, 1932
- Running time: 60 minutes
- Country: United States
- Language: English

The Strange Case of Clara Deane is a 1932 American pre-Code drama film directed by Louis J. Gasnier and Max Marcin, written by Max Marcin, and starring Wynne Gibson, Pat O'Brien, Dudley Digges, Frances Dee, George Barbier, Russell Gleason and Lee Kohlmar. It was released on May 6, 1932, by Paramount Pictures.

== Plot ==
A young dress designer marries an insurance agent. They soon have a daughter, But what the wife doesn't know is that her husband is actually a criminal, who soon involves her—unwittingly—in robbery. Sentenced to prison, she gives up her baby for adoption. When she is released 15 years later, she set out to find her long-lost daughter. A police inspector get involved in her search and, for reasons of his own, tries to dissuade her from finding her child.

== Cast ==
- Wynne Gibson as Clara Deane
- Pat O'Brien as Frank Deane
- Dudley Digges as Detective Garrison
- Frances Dee as Nancy Deane
- George Barbier as Richard Ware
- Russell Gleason as Norman Ware
- Lee Kohlmar as Moses Herzman
- Cora Sue Collins as Nancy Deane
- Florence Britton as Miriam Ware
