= Beating the Game (1921 Western film) =

1921 film

- Directed by: Lee Kohlmar
- Written by: Robert Dillon; Evelyn McKinney
- Starring: Hoot Gibson
- Distributed by: Universal Film Manufacturing Company
- Release date: July 30, 1921
- Running time: 20 minutes
- Country: United States
- Languages: Silent; English intertitles

Beating the Game is a 1921 American silent Western film directed by Lee Kohlmar and featuring Hoot Gibson.

== Plot ==
This plot summary comes from the original Library of Congress copyright filing:

Jack Collins, foreman of the Three Bar Ranch, risks his life to capture some rustlers after the bandits have raided the ranch. After a stiff battle Jack and his men capture and lead the rustlers back to town. There Jack is handed a telegram calling him East to Oak Center, Indian, to collect an inheritance a deceased uncle left him.

He arrives in Oak Center and is the center of attraction to the population. He treats them, inadvertently, to some Western heroics, when he has occasion to lasso a wild Ford, driven by an inexperienced driver, who happens to be Evelyn Trask, the banker's daughter. Their friendship ripens and Jack, upon the word of Evelyn's father, invests his inheritance in some bogus lots through which a branch line of the new railroad is to go through. The proposition turns out to be a swindle and Jack captures the get-rich-quick men, restores their money to the rubes who invested it with them and starts back home.

When he arrives in the West he has a wife with him, who is Evelyn Trask, the girl he saved in Oak Center.

— Evelyn McKinney, story, Robert Dillon, scenario

== Cast ==
- Hoot Gibson as Jack Collins
- Marcella Pershing as Dorothy Trask
- Harry Archer as Bonker Trask
- W. Stuart McCrea credited as Walter McCrea as George Wellington

== See also ==
- List of American films of 1921
