= The Man Who Woke Up (1921 film) =

1921 film

- Directed by: Lee Kohlmar
- Written by: Robert Dillon; Loyal Underwood
- Starring: Hoot Gibson
- Release date: July 23, 1921
- Running time: 20 minutes
- Country: United States
- Languages: Silent; English intertitles

The Man Who Woke Up is a 1921 American short silent Western film directed by Lee Kohlmar and featuring Hoot Gibson.

== Plot ==
This plot come from the Library of Congress, and the original copyright for the film:

"Too Tired Jones," a cowboy with vast and promising cattle interests is a victim of inertia and indifference. So much so that two rustlers of the names of Tucker and Downs are rapidly depleting Jones' band of horses, and they find hazardous work made easy because Jones is too lazy to trail or fight them.

Not so with Wade Harding. His ranch adjoins that of "Too Tired Jones," and whenever the rustlers invaded his ____ and took his stock [paragraph illegible] in the presence of the cowboys it makes Jones mad, fighting mad.

He awakens from his sub-conscious existence, cleans out the saloon, and Tucker and Downs among them. They follow him to his ranch and knock him on the head. In this condition he is found by Rose and Wade.

From that moment he starts to change into a real live human being. His ranch, long neglected, and in violent disorder, begins to transform. Rose visits him to ask him if he won't get the men in Trail City to attend the Sunday School.

He promises he will, and on Sunday morning he again enters the saloon, warns the citizenry that from now on one hour of Sunday morning has got to be given to God. They attend the services and while this is going on, Tucker and Downs burn down Jones' ranch, kidnap Rose, and with most of Wade Harding's and Jones' stock they flee toward the border.

Jones takes up the trail. He proves by the way he outwits the thieves, recovers Rose and his stock that he is no longer "Too Tired Jones" and after his changing into a real live human being, Rose accepts him as her husband.

— Loyal Underwood, story, and Robert Dillon, scenario

== Cast ==
- Hoot Gibson as Too Tired Jones
- Charles Inslee as Wade Harding
- Marcella Pershing as Jones's niece, Rose
- Artie Ortego credited as Art Ortego as Tucker
- Kansas Moehring as Downs
- Jack Walters as Pop
- William Engle as Lanky
