= The Dilemma (1914 film) =

- Directed by: George Morgan
- Written by: George Morgan
- Starring: William Russell
- Release date: February 5, 1914
- Country: United States
- Languages: Silent; English intertitles

The Dilemma is a 1914 short written and directed by George Morgan and featuring William Russell.
