= The Cactus Kid (1921 film) =

1921 film

- Directed by: Lee Kohlmar
- Written by: George Morgan
- Starring: Hoot Gibson
- Production company: Universal Film Manufacturing Company
- Distributed by: Universal Film Manufacturing Company
- Release date: March 26, 1921
- Running time: 20 minutes
- Country: United States
- Languages: Silent; English intertitles

The Cactus Kid is a 1921 American short silent Western film directed by Lee Kohlmar and featuring Hoot Gibson.

== Plot ==
According to a film magazine, "Dick Harris the Texas Ranger, is loafing around the "Ace High" hotel in the boom oil town when he sees Jeremiah Smucker, a wildcat promoter selling worthless oil leases. Dick laughs at Smucker's efforts to dispose of the options and scares away an easy victim. The oil promoter, not knowing that Dick is a ranger, warns him to keep quiet when he is putting across a business deal.

Allen Johnson, an easy going rancher, sends a letter to the promoter stating that he will arrive on the afternoon train with the cash to buy up some of the oil leases. The afternoon stage is held up by Smucker and "Red" Leary. Queen Johnson slips away on one of the horses and meeting Dick on the road tells him about the holdup while she rides for the other Rangers.

Dick drives away the bandits and becomes very friendly with the rancher and his pretty daughter, who in his estimation, certainly is a "Queen Bee." After Johnson has paid for the leases, Smucker discovers that they are really of great value and schemes to get them back. The girl is kidnapped by "Red" and her father receives a message saying that she will be returned if $5,000 random is paid.

The oil man happens along just about this time and offers out of pure generosity to buy back the leases. Johnson jumps at the chance and hands him the paper while Smucker goes for the money. Dick, in the meantime has discovered where Queen is held a prisoner and arrives at the oil shack as she is about to make her escape. To elude "Red" she climbs up the super structure of one of the oil derricks with "Red" following at her heels. Dick sees them, and, climbing to the top of the derrick, battles with "Red" on top of the tall structure. He sends him hurtling to the ground.

Rushing back to town Dick confronts Smucker with the statement that before his ally had died he had signed a confession implicating his chief in the ransom plot. When Dick flashes his Ranger badge upon Smucker, the oil man is frantic to get possession of the confession. In exchange for the lease Dick hands him the sheet of paper which, when it is examined is without writing of any description. Laughing at the promoter's wrath Dick returns to the Johnson home, and Queen and the big Ranger decide to prospect on the land together."

== Cast ==
- Hoot Gibson as Dick Harris
- Charles Newton as Allen Johnson
- Ben Corbett as "Red" Leary
- Connie Henley Queen Johnson
- Duke R. Lee as Jeremiah Smucker

== Censorship ==
Before The Cactus Kid could be exhibited in Kansas, the Kansas Board of Review required the shortening of the struggle scene in cabin between a man and a woman.

== See also ==
- List of American films of 1921
