= George Morgan (screenwriter) =

American actor

- Born: October 10, 1854; Concord, Delaware, U.S.
- Died: January 8, 1936 (aged 81); Philadelphia, Pennsylvania, U.S.
- Occupation: Screenwriter
- Years active: 1913–1936

George Morgan (1854 – January 8, 1936) was an American male actor and screenwriter. He wrote for more than 100 films between 1913 and 1940. He died in Philadelphia, Pennsylvania.

== Selected filmography ==
Screenwriter

- Dick Tracy (1937)
- The Silent Code (1935)
- Badge of Honor (1934)
- When Lightning Strikes (1934)
- Her Forgotten Past (1933)
- The Lost Special (1932)
- The Devil Horse (1932)
- Human Targets (1932)
- Tangled Fortunes (1932)
- The Hurricane Express (1932)
- The Cyclone Kid (1931)
- Heroes of the Flames (1931)
- Finger Prints (1931)
- Quick Trigger Lee (1931)
- Headin' for Trouble (1931)
- The Pirate of Panama (1929)
- Smilin' Guns (1929)
- Wild Blood (1928)
- A Final Reckoning (1928)
- Two Outlaws (1928)
- Galloping Thunder (1927)
- The Silent Flyer (1926)
- The Winking Idol (1926)
- The Great Circus Mystery (1925)
- Romance and Rustlers (1925)
- Perils of the Yukon (1922)
- The Movie Trail (1921)
- Bandits Beware (1921)
- Crossed Clues (1921)
- Who Was the Man? (1921)
- The Cactus Kid (1921)
- Out o' Luck (1921)
- The Fightin' Fury (1921)
- Kickaroo (1921)
- The Saddle King (1921)
- Her Hour (1917)
- The Dilemma (1914)

Actor

- The Merchant of Venice (1916)
