= Who Was the Man? =

1921 film

- Directed by: Lee Kohlmar
- Written by: William James Craft; George Morgan; George H. Plympton
- Starring: Hoot Gibson
- Distributed by: Universal Film Manufacturing Co.
- Release date: April 16, 1921
- Running time: 20 minutes
- Country: United States
- Languages: Silent; English intertitles

Who Was the Man? is a 1921 American short silent Western film directed by Lee Kohlmar, released by Universal Film Mfg. Co. and featuring Hoot Gibson.

== Plot ==
This summary came from the original copyright filing at the Library of Congress:

Reggie, the son of an Eastern pard of Clem Judson, owner of the Oxo Ranch is given a warm reception by the boys when he arrives at the ranch. Dolly Judson is immediately interested in the tenderfoot, who acquires the enmity of Blake, the ranch foreman.

Out on the range Reggie sees Blake in conference with two rustlers and later learns that much stock has been lost. When Blake sees that Dolly likes the tenderfoot he tries desperately for some way to bring Reggie into disfavor. In Reggie's clothes Blake finds a letter which would indicate that he is married and has a family.

After Blake tells this to Dolly she rebukes the tenderfoot and sends him away without a chance for an explanation. But he has no time for explanations as he has tracked the rustlers down and located their hiding place. He sends a man back for Judson and the other punchers to make an attack.

Reggie follows Blake back to the ranch house as Judson and his men ride out. Dolly is about to consent to marry Blake, so disappointed is she with Reggie, when the Easterner arrives and things start to happen. In a short, fast fight Reggie knocks Blake through a door and locks him in while he carries Dolly off.

Blake and several of his men follow Reggie who gets a lead on them, and locks Dolly in a small cabin and then leads Blake on to the rustlers camp where he is caught by Judson and his men. Reggie returns to Dolly and rides for the minister's house.

He is just about to marry the breathless Dolly when Judson and his men burst into the room. Explanations are quickly made establishing Reggie as a Texas Ranger detailed to clean up the gang of rustlers operating on Judson's property. The letter causing all the trouble was from his married sister and after that Dolly hasn't a word of resistance.

== Cast ==
- Hoot Gibson
- Charles Newton
- Jacques Jaccard
- Marcella Pershing
- Ben Corbett
- John Judd

== See also ==
- Hoot Gibson filmography
