= The Solution to the Mystery =

1915 film

- Directed by: B. Reeves Eason
- Starring: Vivian Rich
- Production company: American Film Manufacturing Company
- Distributed by: Mutual Film
- Release date: December 13, 1915
- Country: United States
- Languages: Silent; English intertitles

The Solution to the Mystery is a 1915 short film produced by the American Film Manufacturing Company, released by Mutual Film and directed by B. Reeves Eason.

== Cast ==
- Vivian Rich as Bessie Mitchell
- Roy Stewart as James T. Willard
- Charles Newton as Wilbur Mitchell
- Gayne Whitman as Franklyn Davis
