= Charles Newton (actor) =

American actor

- Born: October 8, 1874; Rochester, New York, US
- Died: 1926 (aged 51–52)
- Occupation: Actor
- Years active: 1915–1926

Charles Newton (October 8, 1874 – 1926) was an American actor of the silent era. He appeared in more than 70 films between 1915 and 1926. He was born in Rochester, New York.

== Selected filmography ==
- Mountain Mary (1915)
- The Exile of Bar-K Ranch (1915)
- The Silver Lining (1915)
- The Solution to the Mystery (1915)
- True Nobility (1916)
- My Fighting Gentleman (1917)
- The Crow (1919)
- The Fighting Line (1919)
- The Kid and the Cowboy (1919)
- The Prospector's Vengeance (1920)
- Hair Trigger Stuff (1920)
- The Moon Riders (1920)
- Wolf Tracks (1920)
- Double Danger (1920)
- The Two-Fisted Lover (1920)
- Tipped Off (1920)
- Superstition (1920)
- Fight It Out (1920)
- The Man with the Punch (1920)
- The Trail of the Hound (1920)
- The Saddle King (1921)
- Colorado (1921)
- The Fightin' Fury (1921)
- The Cactus Kid (1921)
- Who Was the Man? (1921)
- Bandits Beware (1921)
- The Movie Trail (1921)
- Action (1921)
- Red Courage (1921)
- Sure Fire (1921)
- The Loaded Door (1922)
- In the Days of Buffalo Bill (1922)
- Vanity's Price (1924)
- $50,000 Reward (1924)
- Riders of the Purple Sage (1925)
- Yellow Fingers (1926)
- Western Pluck (1926)
