= Lee Kohlmar =

German actor

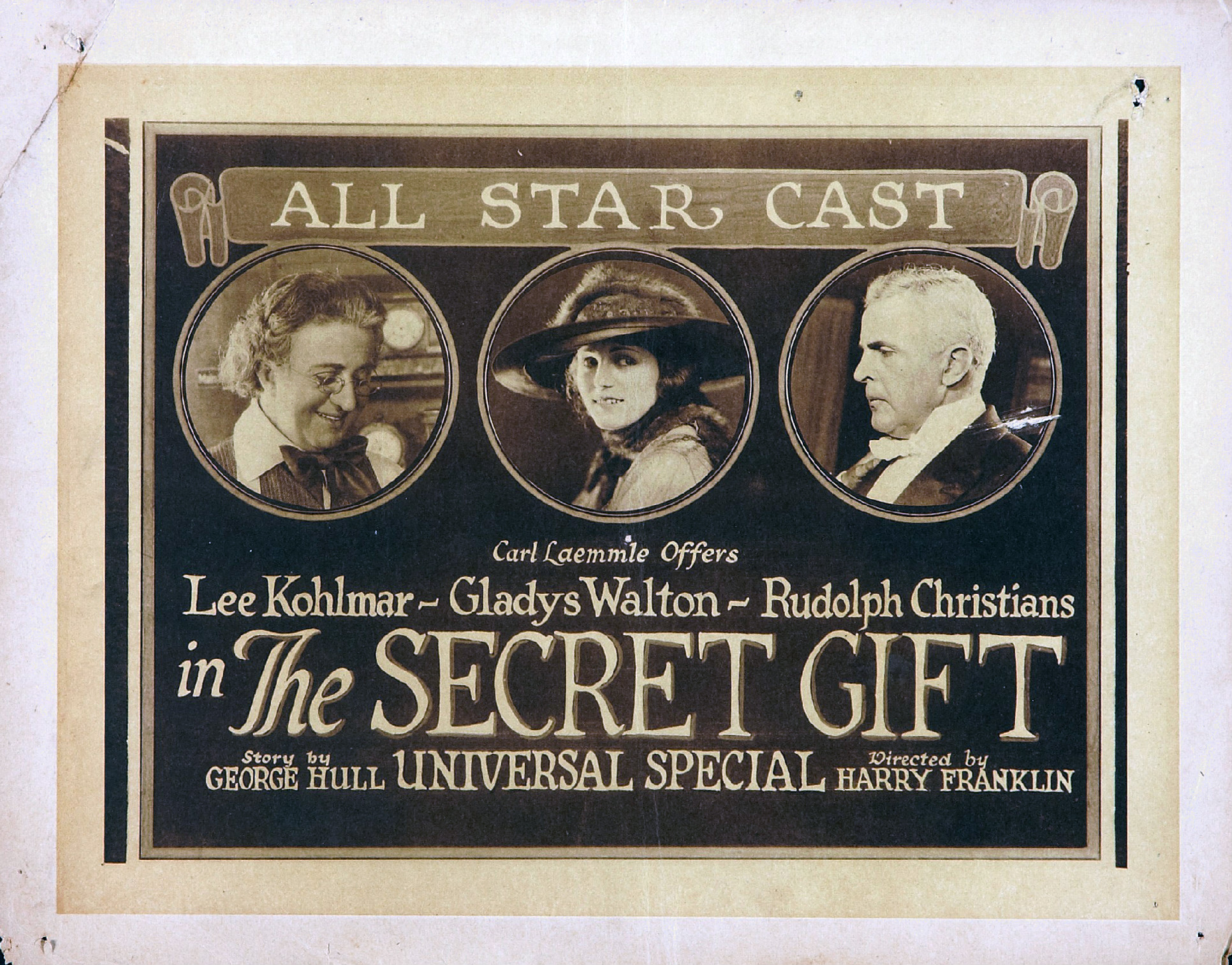
- Kohlmar (left) on lobby card for The Secret Gift (1920)
- Born: 27 February 1873; Forth, Germany
- Died: 14 May 1946 (aged 73); Hollywood, California, U.S.
- Resting place: Mount Judah Cemetery
- Other name: Lee Kolmar
- Occupations: Actor, film director
- Years active: 1916–1941

Lee Kohlmar (27 February 1873 – 14 May 1946) was a German film actor and director. He appeared in more than 50 films between 1916 and 1941. He also directed nine films between 1916 and 1921. He was born in Forth and died in Hollywood, California, from a heart attack. Fred Kohlmar was his son.

== Partial filmography ==
- Judy Forgot (1915) - Dr. Lauberscheimer
- The Secret Gift (1920) - Jan
- The Flaming Disc (1920) - Professor Robert Wade
- Beautifully Trimmed (1920) - Drake
- Orphans of the Storm (1921) - King Louis XVI
- High Heels (1921, director)
- The Cactus Kid (1921, Short, Director)
- Who Was the Man? (1921, Short, Director)
- The Wild Wild West (1921, Short, Director)
- Bandits Beware (1921, Short, Director)
- The Man Who Woke Up (1921, Short, Director)
- Beating the Game (1921, Short, Director)
- Breaking Home Ties (1922) - Father Bergman
- Potash and Perlmutter (1923) - Pasinsky
- The Kibitzer (1930) - Yankel
- The Melody Man (1930) - Adolph
- Personality (1930) - Mr. Himmelschlosser
- Children of Pleasure (1930) - Bernie
- Caught Short (1930) - Peddler
- The Sins of the Children (1930) - Dr. Heinrich Schmidt
- The Strange Case of Clara Deane (1932) - Moses Herzman
- Huddle (1932) - Leo - the Tailor (uncredited)
- The Tenderfoot (1932) - Waiter (uncredited)
- Jewel Robbery (1932) - Hollander
- False Faces (1932) - Earl Wyman (uncredited)
- Scarlet Dawn (1932) - German Tailor (uncredited)
- Silver Dollar (1932) - Hook
- The Match King (1932) - Jeweler (uncredited)
- She Done Him Wrong (1933) - Jacobson (uncredited)
- Forgotten (1933) - Papa Strauss
- Emergency Call (1933) - Elderly Motorist (uncredited)
- I Love That Man (1933) - Old Man Cohen
- Roman Scandals (1933) - Storekeeper
- Son of Kong (1933) - Mickey, 2nd Process Server (uncredited)
- The House of Rothschild (1934) - Doctor
- Twentieth Century (1934) - Beard #2 (uncredited)
- Shoot the Works (1934) - Prof. Jonas
- When Strangers Meet (1934) - Sam Rosinsky
- Music in the Air (1934) - Priest (uncredited)
- The Best Man Wins (1935) - Old German Student (uncredited)
- One More Spring (1935) - Piccolo Player
- Ruggles of Red Gap (1935) - Jailer at Red Gap (uncredited)
- McFadden's Flats (1935) - (uncredited)
- Four Hours to Kill! (1935) - Pa Herman
- Love in Bloom (1935) - Pop Heinrich
- Break of Hearts (1935) - Schubert
- Death from a Distance (1935) - Prof. Ernst Einfeld
- The Farmer Takes a Wife (1935) - Bearded Townsman (uncredited)
- Here Comes Cookie (1935) - Mr. Dingledorp
- The Girl Friend (1935) - German Landlord (uncredited)
- Rendezvous (1935) - Tailor (uncredited)
- Parole! (1936) - Bernstein (uncredited)
- A Son Comes Home (1936) - Proprietor
- Ramona (1936) - Woodcarver Lang (uncredited)
- Wanted! Jane Turner (1936) - John Taylor (uncredited)
- The King and the Chorus Girl (1937) - Second Violinist (uncredited)
- Fly-Away Baby (1937) - Papa - Zeppelin Passenger (uncredited)
- Walter Wanger's Vogues of 1938 (1937) - Employment Clerk (uncredited)
- The Rookie Cop (1939) - Gus - the Night Watchman (uncredited)
- Four Sons (1940) - Doctor (uncredited)
- The Big Store (1941) - Mr. David (uncredited)
