= Out o' Luck =

1921 film

- Directed by: Hoot Gibson
- Written by: George Morgan
- Starring: Hoot Gibson
- Release date: February 19, 1921
- Running time: 20 minutes
- Country: United States
- Languages: Silent; English intertitles

Out o' Luck is a 1921 American short silent Western film directed by and starring Hoot Gibson. It is sometimes mis-catalogued as "Out of Luck," the title of a 1923 film also starring Gibson.

Out o' Luck (1921) in Dutch

== Plot ==
From the copyright application at the Library of Congress:

Out of a job, out of grub and generally out of luck, Buck Kane, a cowpuncher, rides aimlessly around the foothills with nothing on either his mind or his stomach. He meets a bunch of men in uniform and learns that they are guards from an insane asylum, seeking several "nuts" who escaped from the institution the night before. They tell him that he can get a job on the Rankin ranch and Bud starts riding toward the property. On the way he sees Peggy Rankin, daughter of the prosperous rancher, who is roughing it with her maid; that is, she is roughing it with an ultra-modern camping outfit, an automobile tent and other luxuries. She, too, had learned of the escaped lunatics and remembered that the safest way was to humor them.

Buck rides toward them, and the girl and her maid start to run. She remembers to humor a "nut" and greets him profusely as Prince Charming. Thinking that the girl must be crazy, Bud starts to humor her, calling her "Cinderella."

He arrives in time to see Buck save the girl from a real sure-enough lunatic and rewards him with a job, which is less valuable in his estimation than the smile of Peggy, who takes to him enthusiastically and proves to her father that his job on the ranch will grow to include an active part in managing the affairs of the household.

— George Morgan

== Cast ==
- Hoot Gibson
- Connie Henley
- Gertrude Olmstead
- Jim Corey

== See also ==
- Hoot Gibson filmography
