= Colorado (1921 film) =

1921 film

- Directed by: B. Reeves Eason
- Written by: Wallace Clifton; Eleanor Fried
- Produced by: Carl Laemmle
- Starring: Frank Mayo; Charles Newton; Gloria Hope
- Cinematography: Virgil Miller
- Production company: Universal Pictures
- Distributed by: Universal Pictures
- Release date: February 14, 1921
- Running time: 50 minutes
- Country: United States
- Languages: Silent; English intertitles

Colorado is a 1921 American silent Western film directed by B. Reeves Eason and starring Frank Mayo, Charles Newton and Gloria Hope.

== Cast ==
- Frank Mayo as Frank Austin
- Charles Newton as Tom Doyle
- Gloria Hope as Kitty Doyle
- Lillian West as Mrs Doyle
- Charles Le Moyne as James Kincaid
- Tom London as David Collins
- Dan Crimmins as Lem Morgan
- Rosa Gore as Salla Morgan

== Preservation ==
With no holdings located in archives, Colorado is considered a lost film.

== Bibliography ==
- Connelly, Robert B. The Silents: Silent Feature Films, 1910-36, Volume 40, Issue 2. December Press, 1998.
- Munden, Kenneth White. The American Film Institute Catalog of Motion Pictures Produced in the United States, Part 1. University of California Press, 1997.
