= Hoot Gibson =

American actor (1892–1962)

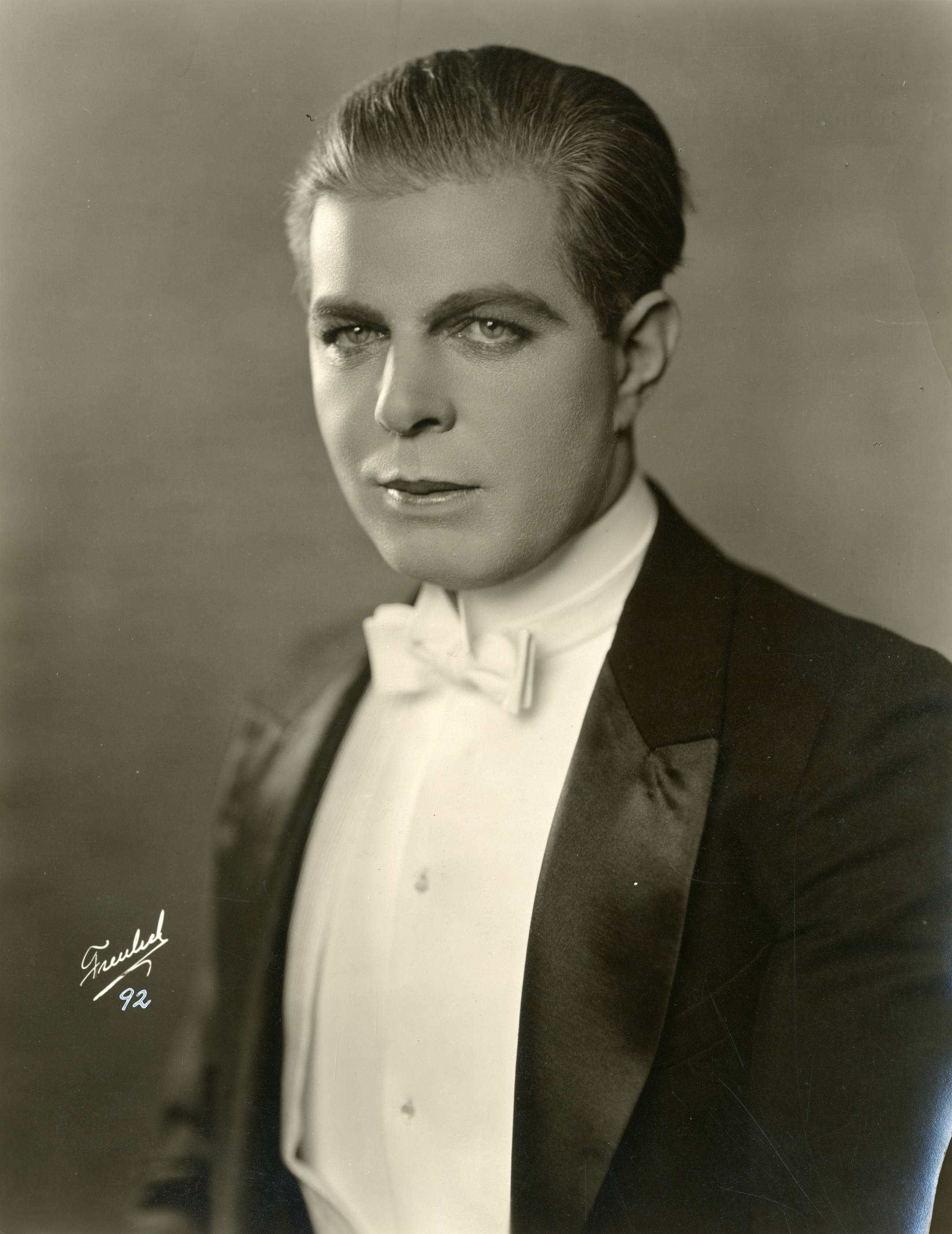
- Gibson, c. 1922
- Born: Edmund Richard Gibson; August 6, 1892; Tekamah, Nebraska, U.S.
- Died: August 23, 1962 (aged 70); Woodland Hills, California, U.S.
- Resting place: Inglewood Park Cemetery, Inglewood, California
- Other names: Ed "Hoot" Gibson; Edward Gibson; Hall Gibson; Ed Hall
- Occupations: Actor; director; producer
- Years active: 1910–1960
- Spouses: Helen Gibson (m. 1913; div. 1920) Helen Johnson (m. 1922; div. 1930) Sally Eilers (m. 1930; div. 1933) Dorothea Dunstan (m. 1942)
- Children: 1

Edmund Richard "Hoot" Gibson (August 6, 1892 – August 23, 1962) was an American rodeo champion, film actor, film director, and producer. While acting and stunt work began as a sideline to Gibson's focus on rodeo, he successfully transitioned from silent films to become a leading performer in Hollywood's growing cowboy film industry.

During the period between World War I and World War II, he was second only to cowboy film legend Tom Mix as a box office draw. He has a star on the Hollywood Walk of Fame and was inducted into the Western Performers Hall of Fame at the National Cowboy & Western Heritage Museum.

== Early life ==
Born Edmund Richard Gibson in Tekamah, Nebraska, on August 6, 1892, he learned to ride a horse at age two. His family moved to California when he was seven years old.

Gibson had a seventh-grade education. "I never had plans to be anything," he explained. "I never took to farming very well, and cattle weren't anything to me, but I was crazy about horses. I just planned to live with horses and ride horses."

Gibson gave varying accounts of how he got his "Hoot" nickname. In an episode of You Bet Your Life (January 19. 1956), he said he acquired the nickname "Hoot" when he used to look for hoot owls in caves as a child in Nebraska. A more likely account was offered by Gibson in an interview: "I got a job at the Owl Drug Company. I delivered things, riding a bicycle. That is where I got the name of Hoot. It came from 'Owl'. The boys started calling me Hoot Owl, and then it got down to Hoot, and Hoot has been with me ever since."

== Career ==
Acting was a minor sideline for Gibson; he competed in rodeos to make a living. In 1912, he won the all-around championship at the famous Pendleton Round-Up in Pendleton, Oregon and the steer roping world championship at the Calgary Stampede.

Gibson's career was temporarily interrupted when he enlisted in the United States Army during World War I as a sergeant in the Tank Corps. When the war ended, he returned to the rodeo business and became good friends with Art Acord, a fellow cowboy and movie actor. The two participated in summer rodeo, then went back to Hollywood for the winter to do stunt work. Gibson recalled, "I went right out to Universal, where I had done stunt riding before the war. I got a part in a picture, a two-reeler, with Breezy Eason directing. I had a juvenile part in this picture, and it was bigger than the lead. [Studio head] Carl Laemmle saw the picture, and he wanted to know who that guy was. Someone told him that I had been with Harry Carey before and played a couple of parts that Harry Carey had give me—first man that had ever given me a part—and Laemmle said, 'Well, give him a lead.' That's the way I got started in two-reel westerns at Universal. Altogether they ran about 60 westerns. Then I was graduated into full-length features with Jack Ford—who is now John Ford, but we always called him Jack. From then on I made eight pictures a year at Universal, up through and including 1930."

Out o' Luck (1921) with Gibson

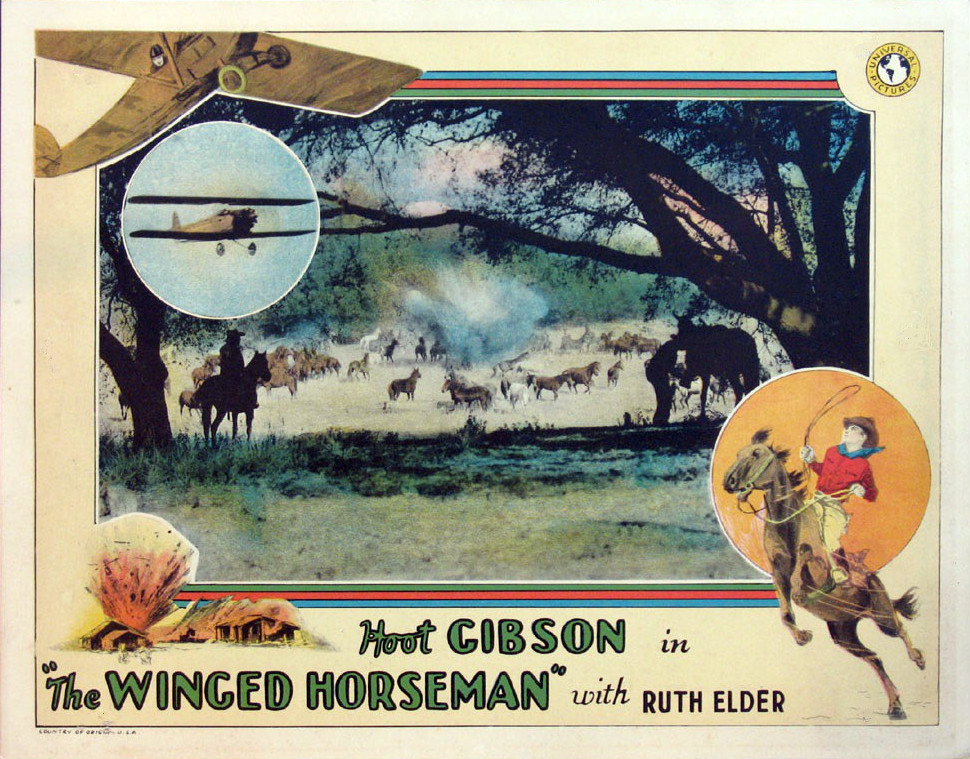
Lobby card for Gibson's film The Winged Horseman (1929)

== Later films ==
Hoot Gibson left Universal, only to find that other studios were not interested in making western features. He signed with independent producer M. H. Hoffman, who kept him working steadily through 1935. Hoffman's Allied Pictures was absorbed by Republic Pictures, where Gibson made a few features and a serial, The Painted Stallion. Gibson also worked for independent producer Walter Futter, and was reunited with old friend Harry Carey for a few features at RKO.

Gibson was off the screen after The Painted Stallion, but was coaxed out of retirement by producer Robert Emmett Tansey. The "trio" format was then popular among western fans—Republic had The Three Mesquiteers, Monogram had The Rough Riders and The Range Busters, and Columbia had Charles Starrett joined by Russell Hayden and Cliff Edwards. Tansey teamed Hoot Gibson with screen veterans Ken Maynard and Bob Steele to form The Trail Blazers. Eleven features were released by Monogram through 1944; these were Gibson's last starring vehicles.

== Financial difficulties and later life ==
Gibson's years of substantial earnings did not see him through his retirement. He had squandered much of his income on high living and poor investments. By the 1950s, Gibson faced financial ruin, in part due to costly medical bills from serious health problems. To get by and pay his bills, he earned money as a greeter at a Las Vegas casino. For a time, he worked in a carnival and took virtually any job his dwindling name value could obtain. At one point he hosted a booth at rodeos that encouraged ranchers to raise nutria. He also appeared in an episode of Groucho's You Bet Your Life, filmed in December 1955. He made the final game with his fellow contestant, but did not win the big money, though he earned himself a share of the $440 prize money for the show.

== Personal life ==
On September 6, 1913, Gibson married Rose August Wenger, a rodeo performer. They had met at the Pendleton Round-Up in Oregon sometime between 1911 and 1913. Under the name Helen Gibson, she became a major film star in her own right for a time, notably in the lead role of The Hazards of Helen. Census records for 1920 indicate they were living separately; Hoot Gibson listed himself as married; Helen listed herself as widowed.

Gibson married vaudeville actress Helen Johnson on April 20, 1922, in Riverside, California. They had one child, Lois Charlotte Gibson. They were divorced on February 2, 1929, in Hollywood, California.

Gibson married film actress Sally Eilers on June 28, 1930. The marriage ended in 1933.

Gibson married a final time to Dorothy Dunstan, a 22-year-old yodeler, on July 3, 1942.

== Death ==
Hoot Gibson died of cancer in 1962 in Woodland Hills, California, at age 70, and was interred in the Inglewood Park Cemetery in Inglewood, California.

== Legacy ==
In 1960, for his contribution to film, Gibson was inducted to the Hollywood Walk of Fame and was honored with a star at 1765 Vine Street in the Motion Pictures section. In 1979, he was inducted into the Western Performers Hall of Fame at the National Cowboy & Western Heritage Museum in Oklahoma City, Oklahoma.
