= Ellison-White Conservatory of Music =

Coordinates: 45.5186°N 122.6821°W

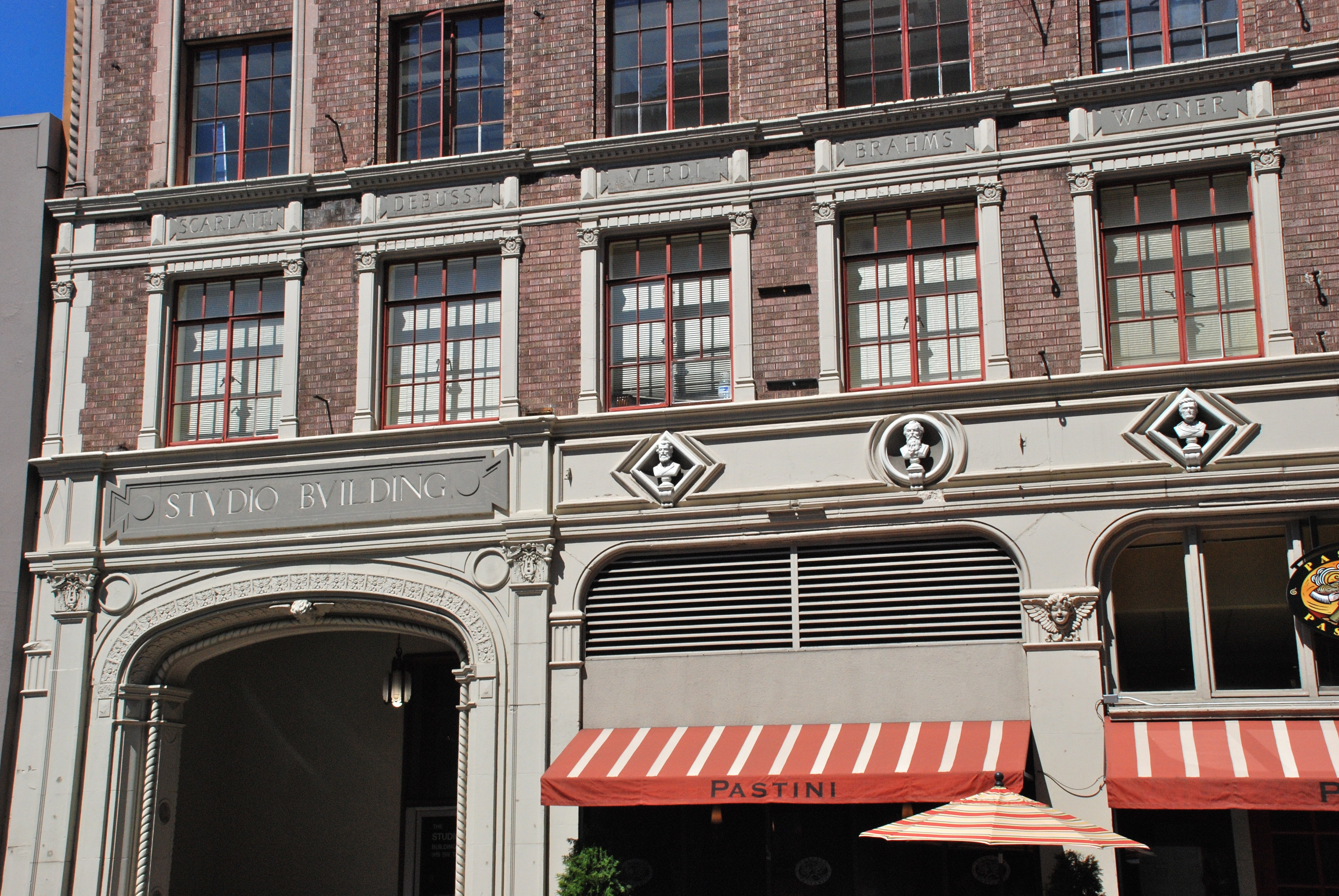
The Studio Building, constructed by the conservatory in 1927, as seen in 2011. Engravings of composers' names are visible above the windows.

The Ellison-White Conservatory of Music was a music conservatory in Portland, Oregon, United States, associated with the Ellison-White Lyceum and Chautauqua Association. The conservatory advertised itself as "answering a need" for a "Standard Conservatory of the Fine Arts" on the U.S. West Coast.

The conservatory opened in 1918 in the Broadway Building, subsequently relocating to northeast Portland. In 1927, the conservatory constructed the nine-story Studio Building in downtown Portland, after which it formally closed some time in the 1940s.

== History ==
Founded by J.R Ellison and Clarence White, the Ellison-White Conservatory was originally located in the Broadway Building in downtown Portland, and held its first classes on September 9, 1918. The conservatory was associated with the Ellison-White Lyceum and Chautauqua Association, which had originated in Boise, Idaho.

The conservatory advertised itself as answering a need for a "Standard Conservatory of the Fine Arts" on the U.S. West Coast. By 1920, the conservatory had relocated from the Broadway Building to a location on Everett Street in northeast Portland. In 1922, the conservatory expanded its voice department. In 1927, the conservatory constructed the historic nine-story Studio Building in downtown Portland, located at SW 9th and Taylor, relocating their operations there. The Studio Building had more than 100 rehearsal studios, sound-proof walls, and was attached to the 450-seat Guild Theatre.

The conservatory was closed by the Ellison-White Lyceum and Chautauqua Association some time in 1940s after the Great Depression, though the exact date is unknown. (Note: The exact date the conservatory ceased operations is unknown. In an Oregon Historical Quarterly article from 1984, Donald Abbott states the conservatory was closed "in the 1930s, likely due to the Great Depression." This is disputed by several sources, however, including an article from the Music Educators Journal from October 1936 that indicates the conservatory was open at date. Subsequent contemporaneous newspaper sources indicate the conservatory was still in operation at least during the early-1940s.)

== Notable people ==
=== Alumni ===
- Walter Chappell, photographer
- Beverley Peck Johnson, vocal coach
- Helen Kleeb, actress
- Jeanette Loff, film actress, singer, and organist

=== Faculty ===
- Pauline Alderman, musicologist
- Jacques Gershkovitch, flautist and conductor

== Sources ==
- Abbott, Donald P. (Fall 1984). "Ellison-White Chautauqua". Oregon Historical Quarterly. 85 (3). Oregon Historical Society: 304–307.
