= Dromgold =

Dromgold is a surname. Notable people with the surname include:

- George Dromgold (1893–1948), American actor and writer
- R. W. Dromgold (c. 1856–1918), American businessman and politician
