= The Last Frontier (serial) =

1932 film

- Directed by: Spencer Gordon Bennet; Thomas Storey
- Written by: Karl R. Coolidge; Robert F. Hill; George H. Plympton; Arthur Rohlsfel; Courtney Ryley Cooper (novel)
- Produced by: Fred McConnell
- Starring: Lon Chaney Jr. Dorothy Gulliver; Ralph Bushman; William Desmond; Joe Bonomo; Pete Morrison; LeRoy Mason
- Cinematography: Edward Snyder; Gilbert Warrenton
- Edited by: Tom Malloy
- Distributed by: RKO Radio Pictures
- Release date: September 5, 1932
- Running time: 12 chapters (213 minutes)
- Country: United States
- Language: English

The Last Frontier is an American Pre-Code 12-chapter serial, distributed by RKO Radio Pictures in 1932. The story was based on the novel of the same name by Courtney Ryley Cooper.

The serial starred Lon Chaney Jr. as the hero The Black Ghost. Dorothy Gulliver was the leading female star. The total running time of the serial is 213 minutes.

This serial was also released theatrically in 1932 as a 70-minute feature version called The Black Ghost.

== Plot ==
The outlaw "Tiger" Morris tries to drive settlers off their land in order to acquire the local gold deposits. A crusading newspaper editor, Tom Kirby, becomes the masked vigilante called The Black Ghost to stop him. The gimmick in this serial is that Chaney is a white man who disguises himself as a Hispanic Zorro-like vigilante, without covering his face (he simply applies a mustache and a hat), and yet his close friends don't ever seem to recognize that he is the Black Ghost. There are two villains in the serial, "Tiger" Morris and a warlike Indian chief nmed Pawnee Blood.

== Cast ==
- Lon Chaney Jr. as Tom Kirby, editor of the local newspaper and the masked vigilante The Black Ghost
- Dorothy Gulliver as Betty Halliday
- Ralph Bushman as Jeff Maitland
- William Desmond as General George Custer
- Joe Bonomo as Joe, one of Morris' henchman. Listed as "Kit Gordon" in the credits.
- Pete Morrison as Hank, one of Morris' henchman
- LeRoy Mason as Buck, Morris' spearpoint heavy (chief henchman)
- Yakima Canutt as Wild Bill Hickok
- Mary Jo Desmond as Aggie Kirby
- Slim Cole as Uncle Happy
- Richard Neill as Leige "Tiger" Morris, outlaw
- Judith Barrie as Rose Maitland
- Claude Payton as Colonel Halliday
- Ben Corbett as Bad Ben, one of Morris' henchman
- Frank Lackteen as Chief Pawnee Blood
- Fritzi Fern as Mariah

== Production ==
The Last Frontier was RKO's only serial.

== Chapter titles ==
1. The Black Ghost Rides
2. The Thundering Herd
3. The Black Ghost Strikes
4. The Fatal Shot
5. Clutching Sands
6. The Terror Trail
7. Doomed
8. Facing Death
9. Thundering Doom
10. The Life Line
11. Driving Danger
12. The Black Ghost's Last Ride

_{Source:}

== See also ==
- List of film serials by year
- List of film serials by studio
