= Fighting Through =

Fighting Through may refer to:

- Fighting Through (1919 film), a silent American drama film
- Fighting Through (1934 film), an American Western film
- Fighting Thru, a 1930 American Western film
