= Pastini =

Chain of Italian restaurants in Oregon, U.S.

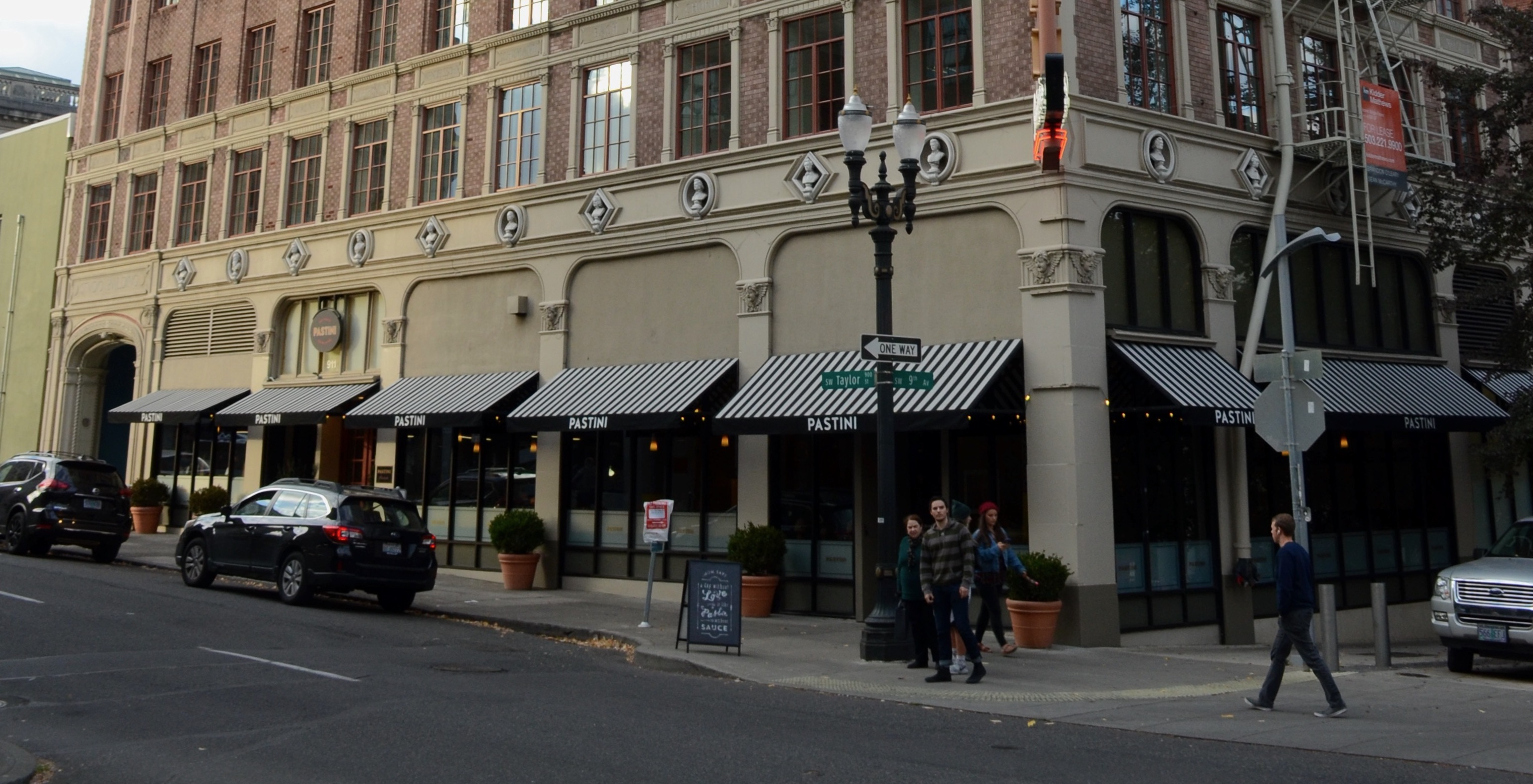
- Exterior of the restaurant in downtown Portland's Studio Building in 2019

Restaurant information
- Established: 2001
- Owners: Craig Bashel; Susan Bashel; Kara Hale
- Food type: Italian
- Location: Bend; Corvallis; Eugene; Portland, Oregon, United States
- Website: pastini.com

Pastini (formerly Pastini Pastaria) is a chain of Italian-American restaurants in the U.S. state of Oregon. There were eight restaurants in 2017. In 2018, the company was among the largest in Oregon owned by women, with approximately 300 employees, according to Portland Business Journal.

== Description ==
Restaurant in southeast Portland, Oregon, 2021

Pastini serves Italian-American cuisine. The Bend restaurant had 30 pasta options in 2014. In 2020, Willamette Week's Matthew Singer called the chain "Oregon's answer to Olive Garden".

== History and locations ==
There were three restaurants in Portland, plus one in Bend and another in Corvallis, in 2016. Craig and Susan Bashel and Kara Hale were owners at the time.

In September 2020, Pastini supplied food to the Lyons Fire Department during the Santiam Fire and donated proceeds from each meal served at restaurants to the Red Cross Cascades Fire fund.

=== Portland ===
Location in northeast Portland, Oregon, 2025

The Bashels and Hale opened the first restaurant near the Lloyd Center in 2001. Five more restaurants were opened in Portland within six years. One of the Portland restaurants is housed on the ground level of the Studio Building, near downtown's Director Park. The restaurant installed a 23.5-foot (7.2 m) sign on the Studio Building's exterior. During a remodel, the restaurant learned some of the Guild Theatre's restrooms were "technically in its space".

Previously, there was a restaurant in northwest Portland's Nob Hill district, which was replaced by Grassa.

In December 2020, Bashel represented Pastini in the Rose City Downtown Collective, a coalition of business seeking to revitalize the city center following the COVID-19 pandemic.

=== Bend and Corvallis ===
Pastini expanded into Bend and Corvallis in 2008. The Bend restaurant opened in the Old Mill District. During the pandemic, the restaurant offered take-out services, as of May.

=== Eugene ===
Owners confirmed plans for a restaurant in Eugene in 2016. The restaurant opened in July 2017.

== Reception ==
Pastini has been included in guides published by Fodor's in 2008, and 2010, and 2011. In her 2011 book Fun with the Family Oregon: Hundreds of Ideas for Day Trips with the Kids, Sarah Pagliasotti said Pastini offered "inexpensive and elegant pasta that's a perennial family favorite". Pastini won first place in the Best Italian category of the Daily Emerald's "Best of Campus" 2020 edition, which said, "This bistro chain is the perfect place to get a classic taste of the Italian food you’re craving with a fun modern twist, both in the ambiance and the flavors. Pastini has a wide range of contemporary plates and appetizers to satisfy whatever genre of noodle you’re hoping for."

== See also ==
- List of companies based in Oregon
- List of Italian restaurants
- List of restaurant chains in the United States
