= Studio Building =

Studio Building may refer to:

- Studio Building (Berkeley, California)
- Studio Building (Boston, Massachusetts)
- Studio Building (66th Street, Manhattan)
- Studio Building (77th Street, Manhattan)
- Studio Building (Portland, Oregon)
- Studio Building (Toronto)

== See also ==
- Sherwood Studio Building (New York City, 1879–1960)
