= Broadway Building =

Broadway Building may refer to:

- Broadway Building (Lorain, Ohio), listed on the National Register of Historic Places in Lorain County, Ohio
- Broadway Building (Portland, Oregon), listed on the National Register of Historic Places in Multnomah County, Oregon
- Broadway Building (Hollywood), a short name for the Broadway Hollywood Building.
