= Hold 'Em Yale (1928 film) =

1928 film

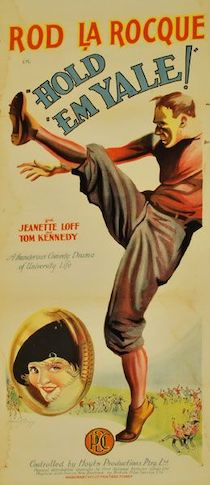
- Theatrical poster
- Directed by: Edward H. Griffith
- Based on: At Yale by Owen Davis
- Produced by: George Dromgold
- Starring: Rod La Rocque; Jeanette Loff
- Cinematography: Arthur Miller
- Edited by: Harold McLernon
- Distributed by: Pathé Exchange
- Release date: May 14, 1928
- Running time: 73 minutes (8 reels)
- Country: United States
- Language: English

Hold 'Em Yale, alternately known as At Yale, is a 1928 American silent comedy film directed by Edward H. Griffith and starring Rod La Rocque, Jeanette Loff, and Hugh Allan. It was adapted from the Owen Davis play of the same name, and executive-produced by Cecil B. DeMille. The film was preserved by the Academy Film Archive in 2013.

== Cast ==
- Rod La Rocque as Jaime Emmanuel Alvarado Montez
- Jeanette Loff as Helen Bradbury
- Hugh Allan as Jack Bradbury
- Joseph Cawthorn as Professor George Bradbury
- Tom Kennedy as Detective
- Jerry Mandy as Jaime's Valet
- Lawrence Grant as Don Alvaro Montez
- Oscar Smith as Black Butler

== Production ==
Production of Hold 'Em Yale began on December 27, 1927.
