= Hidden Gold =

Hidden Gold may refer to:

- Hidden Gold (1932 film), directed by Arthur Rosson
- Hidden Gold (1940 film), directed by Lesley Selander
