= Ex-Flame =

1930 film

- Marian Nixon and Neil Hamilton
- Directed by: Victor Halperin
- Written by: Mrs. Henry Wood (novel); George Draney; Victor Halperin
- Produced by: Edward Halperin; M.H. Hoffman
- Starring: Neil Hamilton; Marian Nixon; Norman Kerry
- Cinematography: Ernest Miller
- Edited by: W. Donn Hayes
- Production company: Liberty Pictures
- Distributed by: Liberty Pictures
- Release date: November 19, 1930
- Running time: 74 minutes
- Country: United States
- Language: English

Ex-Flame is a 1930 American pre-Code drama film directed by Victor Halperin and starring Neil Hamilton, Marian Nixon, and Norman Kerry. The film is an adaptation of the 1861 Victorian novel East Lynne, but is set in contemporary England. This was the first production of the Poverty Row company Liberty Pictures. The following year, a more celebrated film version of the novel was released by Fox Film. Some sources state this is a lost film.

== Cast ==
- Neil Hamilton as Sir Carlisle Austin
- Marian Nixon as Lady Catherine
- Judith Barrie as Barbara Lacey
- Norman Kerry as Beaumont Winthrop
- 'Snub' Pollard as Boggins
- Roland Drew as Umberto
- José Bohr as Argentinean
- Joan Standing as Kilmer
- Cornelius Keefe as Keith
- May Beatty as Lady Harriett
- Lorimer Johnston as Colonel Lacey
- Joseph North as Wilkins
- Charles Crockett as Parson
- Billy Haggerty as Master Stuart Austin
- Louis Armstrong as himself

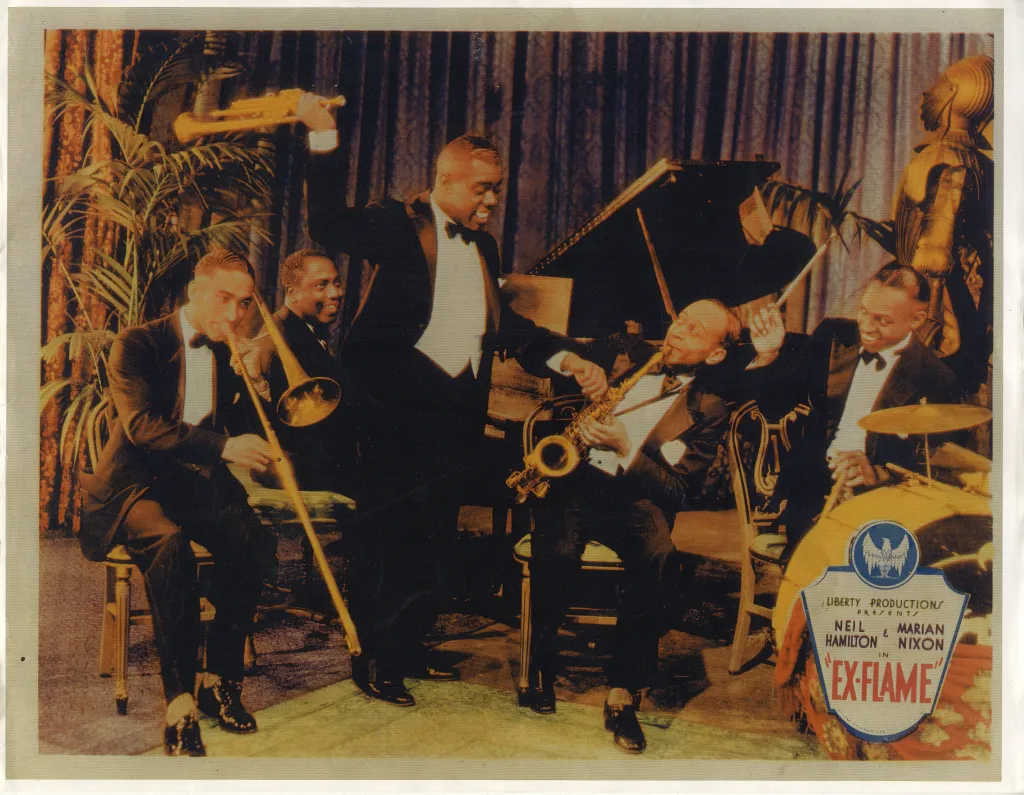
A lobby card featuring Louis Armstrong

== Bibliography ==
- Pitts, Michael R. Poverty Row Studios, 1929–1940: An Illustrated History of 55 Independent Film Companies, with a Filmography for Each. McFarland & Company, 2005.
