= Party Girl (1930 film) =

1930 film

- Cover of sheet music for "Oh! How I Adore You" from Party Girl
- Directed by: Victor Halperin
- Written by: George Draney; Victor Halperin; Monte M. Katterjohn
- Based on: Dangerous Business; 1927 novel by Edwin Balmer
- Produced by: Victor Halperin
- Starring: Douglas Fairbanks Jr. Jeanette Loff; Marie Prevost
- Cinematography: Henry Cronjager; Robert Newhard
- Edited by: Russell F. Schoengarth
- Music by: Harry Stoddard
- Production company: Victory Pictures
- Distributed by: Tiffany Pictures
- Release date: January 1, 1930 (New York City)
- Running time: 67 minutes
- Country: United States
- Language: English

Party Girl is a 1930 American pre-Code crime film directed by Victor Halperin and starring Douglas Fairbanks Jr., Jeanette Loff, and Marie Prevost. It is also known by the alternative title of Dangerous Business, the title of the novel on which it is based. It follows a New York businessman who inadvertently becomes involved in the criminal activities of a covert escort agency.

== Plot ==
Maude Lindsay operates the Lindsay Social Bureau, which is a covert front for a "party girl" escort agency that caters to high-class playboys attempting to close business deals. Jay Rountree, the son of a bottle manufacturer, is engaged to marry his secretary, Ellen Powell, a former party girl, whose roommate, Diana Hoster, secretly works as a party girl.

Around Christmas time, Jay and his friends crash one of the girls' parties, where he meets Leeda Cather, the daughter of a formerly-prominent New York family who has gone destitute. A drunken Jay spends the night with Leeda, awaking in her room the next morning, where she exclaims that he "ruined her" the previous night. When Leeda's "mother" confronts the two in bed, Leeda claims she eloped with Jay the night before, a story which he goes along with. Leeda then suggests to Jay that the two marry that afternoon.

When news of their elopement makes the papers, Leeda calls her ex-fiancé Paul Newcast, a businessman who was hesitant to marry her. Happy to be free of the obligation, he gives Jay's father a business contract, as well as sending Leeda $5,000. Jay overhears the conversation and confronts her, but she insists the marriage benefits him and his father's business. At a Christmas Eve dinner at his family's home, Jay tells his father about Leeda's deception, after which she states she pressured Paul into signing the contract, and threatens to implicate Jay and his father in a public scandal.

Meanwhile, Ellen learns of Jay and Leeda's relationship, and is persuaded to attend one of Maude's parties. Police subsequently arrive at Leeda's apartment to investigate the party girl racket, and make a deal with her if she cooperates with the investigation. Leeda attempts to flee via a fire escape, and falls several stories. Jay arrives just before Leeda dies, and she remorsefully instructs him to save Ellen from the party being raided by police. Jay manages to arrive at the party just before the police and explains to them that he and Ellen are not involved in the party girl racket. Maude attempts to convince the police that Ellen is in fact a party girl, but her secretary, Miss Manning, attests that Ellen has never worked for her. After the police depart, Jay proposes to Ellen and she accepts.

== Cast ==
- Douglas Fairbanks Jr. as Jay Rountree
- Jeanette Loff as Ellen Powell
- Judith Barrie as Leeda Cather
- Marie Prevost as Diana Hoster
- John St. Polis as John Rountree
- Sammy Blum as Sam Metten
- Harry Northrup as Robert Lowry
- Almeda Fowler as Maude Lindsay
- Hal Price as Lew Albans
- Charles Giblyn as Lawrence Doyle
- Sidney D'Albrook as Investigator
- Lucien Prival as Paul Newcast
- Florence Dudley as Miss Manning

== Production ==
During the production of the film, actor Paul Bern dated Loff, Barrie, and Prevost, the film's three principal female stars.

== Release ==
Party Girl premiered in New York City on New Year's Day 1930, expanding on January 25. Due to its themes surrounding sexuality, the film was banned in some U.S. cities, such as Birmingham, Alabama. While the Chicago Board of Censors may not have required any cuts, it passed the film with a pink ticket, or "adults only", while showing at the Woods Theatre. The film was rejected by the British Board of Film Censors and remained unreleased in the UK until 2003, when it was passed with a PG certificate.

=== Home media ===
Alpha Video released Party Girl on DVD on April 25, 2006.

== See also ==
- List of banned films

== Sources ==
- Fleming, E.J. (March 23, 2009). Paul Bern: The Life and Famous Death of the MGM Director and Husband of Harlow. Jefferson, North Carolina: McFarland. ISBN 978-0-786-45274-3.
