= Million Dollar Baby (1934 film) =

- Directed by: Joseph Santley
- Written by: Joseph Santley; John W. Krafft
- Produced by: Ben Verschleiser; W. Ray Johnston
- Starring: Arline Judge; Ray Walker; Jimmy Fay
- Cinematography: Harry Neumann
- Edited by: Carl Pierson
- Production company: Monogram Pictures
- Distributed by: Monogram Pictures
- Release date: December 29, 1934
- Running time: 65 minutes
- Country: United States
- Language: English

Million Dollar Baby is a 1934 American comedy film directed by Joseph Santley and starring Arline Judge, Ray Walker and Jimmy Fay.

== Plot ==
Hoping to cash in on the Shirley Temple craze, a couple of vaudeville actors dress their son up as a girl and enter him into a competition to find a new child star. After winning the contest they travel to Hollywood, but their son escapes from the train before being kidnapped by a gang who plan to extort a ransom from the studio.

== Cast ==
- Arline Judge as Grace Sweeney
- Ray Walker as Terry Sweeney
- Jimmy Fay as Pat Sweeney
- George E. Stone as Joe Lewis
- Willard Robertson as Doctor
- Ralf Harolde as Mac
- Jeanette Loff as Rita Ray
- Arthur Stone as Jim
- Harry Holman as J.D. Pemberton
- Paul Porcasi as Marvelo #1
- Eddie Kane as Bill Dovan
- Claudia Coleman as Studio Actress
- Marc Lawrence as Gangster
- Wilbur Mack as Freeman
- Lee Shumway as Tony
- Edward Peil Sr. as Louie
- Louise Beavers as Black Mother
- Velma Connor as Sister Act

== Bibliography ==
- Jean-Louis Ginibre. Ladies Or Gentlemen: A Pictorial History of Male Cross-dressing in the Movies. Filipacchi Publishing, 2005.
