= St. Louis Woman (film) =

Film directed by Albert Ray

- Directed by: Albert Ray
- Written by: Elwood Ullman; Jack Natteford
- Produced by: Al Alt; Sam Katzman
- Starring: Jeanette Loff; Johnny Mack Brown; Earle Foxe
- Cinematography: George Meehan
- Edited by: S. Roy Luby
- Production company: Screencraft Productions
- Distributed by: Marcy Pictures
- Release date: April 15, 1934
- Running time: 68 minutes
- Country: United States
- Language: English

St. Louis Woman is a 1934 American pre-Code musical drama film directed by Albert Ray and starring Jeanette Loff, Johnny Mack Brown and Earle Foxe. It is also known by the alternative title of Missouri Nightingale.

== Plot ==
After being expelled from college for spending time at a nightclub, a glamorous singer persuades her boyfriend to give him a job on a professional football team. He soon falls in love with her and forgets about his own girlfriend.

== Cast ==
- Jeanette Loff as Lou Morrison, the St. Louis Woman
- Johnny Mack Brown as Jim Warren
- Earle Foxe as Harry Crandall
- Roberta Gale as Eleanor Farnham
- Dareece Murphy as Beezy
- Eddie Clayton as Musician
- Sterrett Ford as Owner
- Tom London as Lions Coach Ryan
- Blackie Whiteford as First Joe
- Louise Holden as Mrs. Warren
- Wilbur Higby as Mr. Warren
- Bruce Mitchell as Detective
- Bernie Lamont as Thug
- Oscar 'Dutch' Hendrian as Thug
- Robert McKenzie as Team Trainer
- Harrison Greene as Man in Soup Line
- Ed Porter as Joe Proctor

== Bibliography ==
- Pitts, Michael R. Poverty Row Studios, 1929–1940: An Illustrated History of 55 Independent Film Companies, with a Filmography for Each. McFarland & Company, 2005.
