= Judith Barrie =

American actress and model

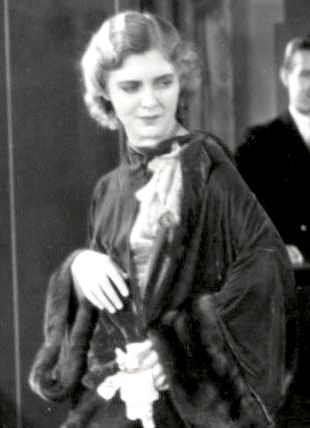
- Barrie in Party Girl, 1929
- Born: Catherine Brown; March 1907; Sacramento, California, U.S.
- Died: January 9, 1991 (aged 83); Reno, Nevada, U.S.
- Occupation(s): Actress, model
- Years active: 1930–1932
- Spouses: Edward Halperin (m. 1928; div. 1932); Norman Coit Lee (m. 1933)

Judith Barrie (born Catherine Brown; March 1907 – January 9, 1991) was an American actress and model who appeared in four films from 1930 to 1932, retiring after her brief marriage to producer Edward Halperin.

== Biography ==
Born Catherine Brown (Note: Barrie's mother is identified as Eva Brown of Lancaster, California in a 1933 article concerning Barrie's marriage to Norman Coit Lee; in this same article, Barrie's birth name is noted as Catherine Brown. Census records from Sacramento during the 1910 census list Fred and Eva Brown and their two daughters, Hermia (b. 1906) and Catherine (b. 1907), residing in the city's 123 enumeration district. A Los Angeles Times profile published March 9, 1930, detailing Barrie's birthday party suggests she was born in early March.) and raised in Sacramento, Barrie was the granddaughter of a wealthy wheat merchant in California. Her father was Fred Brown, and her mother, Eva Brown, of Lincoln, California. She had one older sister, Hermia (born 1906). She graduated from Miss Head's School, a girls' boarding school in Berkeley. After graduating, she worked as a model in New York City, and became a muse of artist James Montgomery Flagg. While in New York, she also performed professionally as a concert pianist.

While modeling, Barrie was noticed by producer Edward Halperin (brother of director Victor Halperin) who suggested to her that she seek a career in film. After appearing in her feature debut in Party Girl (1930) opposite Douglas Fairbanks, Jr, she served as a model for the life-size bronze statue used to welcome visitors at the 1932 Summer Olympics in Los Angeles. She subsequently appeared in Ex-Flame (1930), and the Western The Last Frontier (1932). She was then cast in a lead role opposite Tom Mix in the Western Hidden Gold (1932).

Barrie was married to Edward Halperin from 1928 until 1932, when he filed for divorce, claiming she did not love him. She subsequently married Norman Coit Lee, a broker from New York City, on August 25, 1933 in Reno, Nevada. After her marriage to Lee, Barrie formally retired from acting.

== Filmography ==
| Year | Title | Role | Notes | Ref. |
|---|---|---|---|---|
| 1930 | Party Girl | Leeda Cather | | |
| 1930 | Ex-Flame | Barbara Lacey | Also known as: Mixed Doubles | |
| 1932 | The Last Frontier | Rose Maitland | | |
| 1932 | Hidden Gold | Nora Lane | | |

== Sources ==
- Rhodes, Gary D. (2015). White Zombie: Anatomy of a Horror Film. Jefferson, North Carolina: McFarland. ISBN 978-1-476-60491-6.
