= Don Coleman (actor) =

American actor

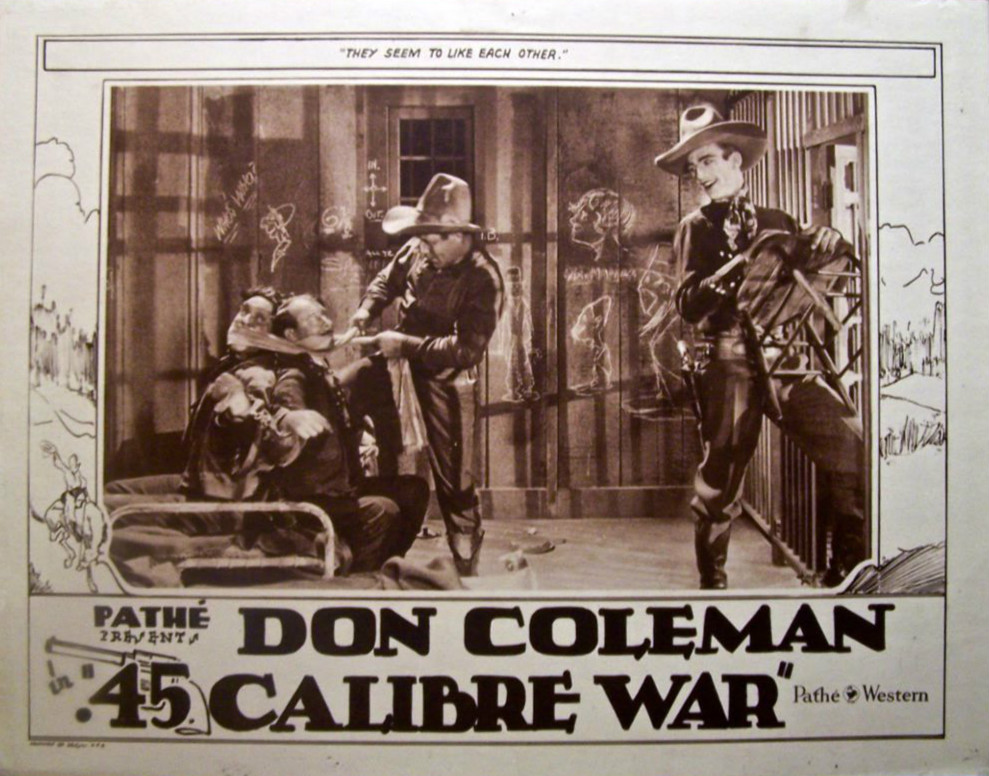
- Born: January 14, 1893; Sheridan, Wyoming, United States
- Died: December 16, 1985 (aged 92); Willits, California, United States
- Occupation: Actor
- Years active: 1925-1930 (film)

Don Coleman (January 14, 1893 – December 16, 1985) was an American film actor. He starred in westerns released by Pathe Exchange during the silent era such as The Black Ace.

== Selected filmography ==
- Border Blackbirds (1927)
- The Bronc Stomper (1928)
- The Boss of Rustler's Roost (1928)
- The Apache Raider (1928)
- The Black Ace (1928)
- .45 Calibre War (1929)

== Bibliography ==
- Munden, Kenneth White. The American Film Institute Catalog of Motion Pictures Produced in the United States, Part 1. University of California Press, 1997.
