= .45 Calibre War =

1929 film

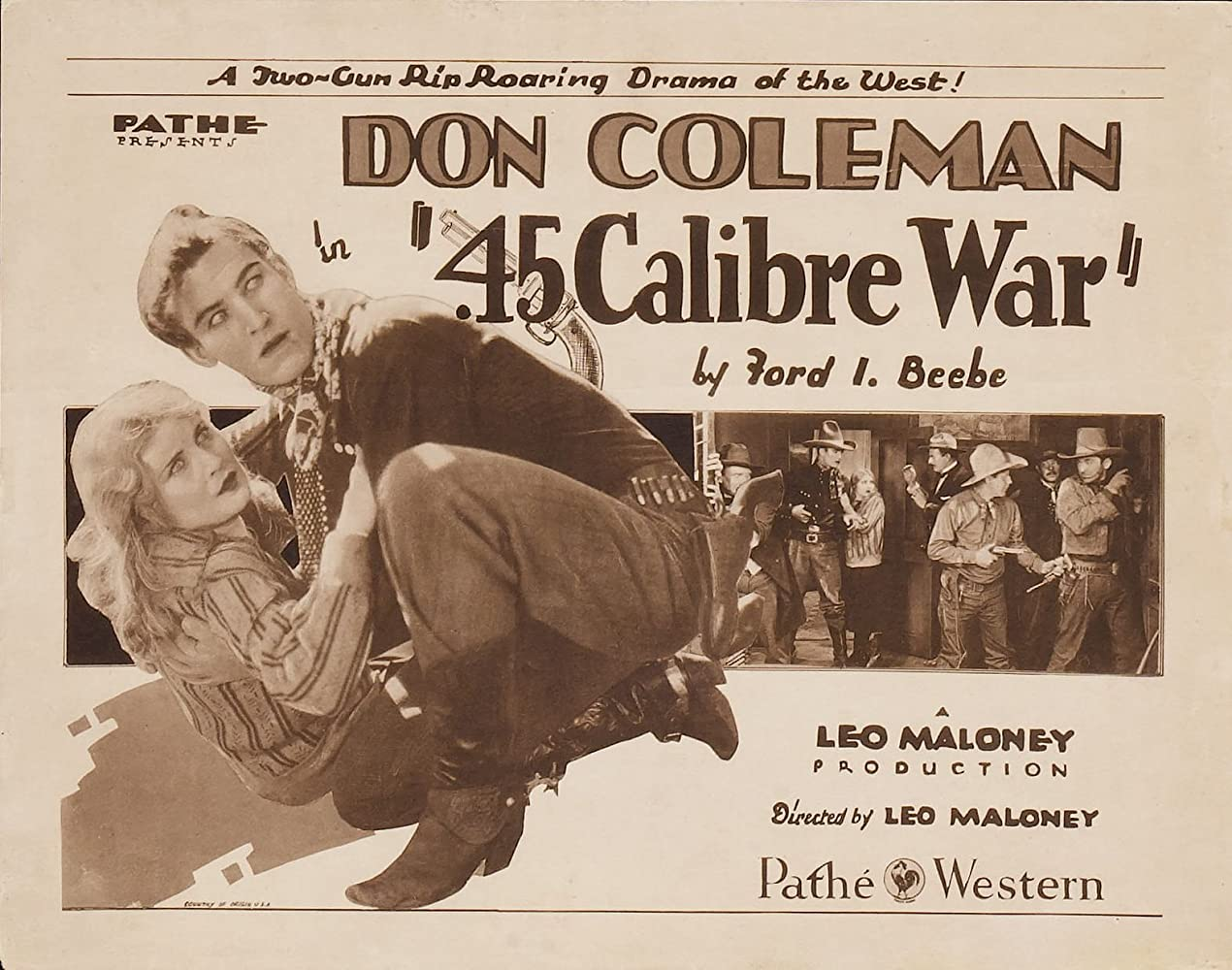
- Directed by: Leo D. Maloney
- Written by: Ford Beebe
- Produced by: Leo D. Maloney
- Starring: Don Coleman; Ben Corbett; Jeanette Loff
- Cinematography: Edward A. Kull
- Edited by: Joseph Kane
- Production company: Leo Maloney Productions
- Distributed by: Pathe Exchange
- Release date: February 17, 1929
- Running time: 50 minutes
- Country: United States
- Languages: Silent; English intertitles

.45 Calibre War is a lost 1929 American silent Western film directed by Leo D. Maloney and starring Don Coleman, Ben Corbett and Jeanette Loff.

== Plot ==
Reed Lathrop returns to his old home, accompanied by his friend, "Toad" Hunter, to investigate a plot that forces ranchers to sell their properties for very low prices. Finding the ranchers demoralized, he organizes a vigilance committee and enlists the aid of the local circuit judge. Darnell, the owner of the saloon, and Blodgett, a local dealer in ranch property, are unmasked as the culprits. Soon a showdown takes place with the ranchers and the outlaws, ending with the criminals hauled off to prison.

== Cast ==
- Don Coleman as Reed Lathrop
- Ben Corbett as 'Toad' Hunter
- Al Hart as Rev. Mr. Simpson
- Ed Jones as Sheriff Henshaw
- Duke R. Lee as Nick Darnell
- Floyd Ames as Jim Walling
- Jeanette Loff as Ruth Walling
- Murdock MacQuarrie as Mark Blodgett
- Orin Jackson as Dr. Sprague

== Preservation ==
With no holdings located in archives, .45 Calibre War is considered a lost film.
