= Annapolis (1928 film) =

1928 film

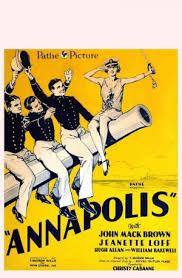
- Directed by: Christy Cabanne
- Written by: F. McGrew Willis (writer); John W. Krafft (titles)
- Based on: story by Royal S. Pease
- Starring: Johnny Mack Brown; Jeanette Loff
- Cinematography: Arthur C. Miller
- Edited by: Claude Berkeley
- Production company: Pathé Exchange/RKO
- Distributed by: Pathé Exchange
- Release date: November 18, 1928
- Running time: 88 minutes; 8 reels
- Country: United States
- Languages: Sound (Synchronized); English intertitles

Annapolis is a 1928 American synchronized sound drama film directed by Christy Cabanne. While the film has no audible dialog, it was released with a synchronized musical score with sound effects using both the sound-on-disc and sound-on-film process. It was recorded using the Photophone sound system. It stars Johnny Mack Brown, Jeanette Loff and Hugh Allan.

Prints and incomplete prints exist.

== Plot ==
Bill and Herbert, both new classmen at the United States Naval Academy in Annapolis, first meet at a railway station near the academy. Bill, the son of a respected naval officer, is earnest and disciplined, focused entirely on fulfilling his duty as a cadet. In contrast, Herbert, more sensitive and quick to take offense, is irked by Bill’s conduct and develops a strong dislike for him from the outset.

Tension brews between the two, erupting in frequent quarrels. During gunnery practice, they nearly come to blows, and later in boat training, Herbert is accidentally knocked overboard by a swinging boom. He blames Bill for the incident. However, Bill later approaches Herbert in a spirit of reconciliation, and the two gradually become close friends.

Disaster strikes again during a navigation exercise when Herbert leaves the wheel to study a chart. The vessel collides with a small boat, nearly drowning two men. A formal investigation is launched, and Herbert is confined to his quarters under suspicion.

Meanwhile, Betty, Herbert’s fiancée, arrives in Annapolis with her Aunt to attend the commencement ball. On the electric train to the academy, Betty meets Bill after he gallantly gives up his seat to a mother and child and takes the only other available one—next to her. They share a charming and unexpected connection. Bill snaps a photograph, believing he’s captured Betty’s image, but when the film is developed by his roommates, Fat and Skippy, it turns out he accidentally photographed a circus freak who had wandered into the frame.

As Bill continues to court Betty, unaware of her engagement to Herbert, Herbert violates his confinement and interrupts a romantic moment between them in the hotel garden. Betty remains silent about her feelings for Bill due to her commitment to Herbert. Later, in a desperate attempt to avoid detection, Herbert assaults a guard while sneaking back into the academy.

Evidence points to Bill as the assailant. Though he knows Herbert is responsible, Bill chooses to take the blame to protect his friend. Betty, learning the truth, appeals to the Admiral and reveals Herbert's guilt. Just as Bill is about to face court-martial, a letter arrives from Herbert confessing to the offense and clearing Bill’s name.

After finding love and understanding amid the duty and honor, Bill and Betty, share a dance at the grand commencement ball.

== Cast ==
- Johnny Mack Brown as Bill
- Hugh Allan as Herbert
- Jeanette Loff as Betty
- Maurice Ryan as Fat
- William Bakewell as Skippy
- Byron Munson as First Classman
- Charlotte Walker as Aunt
- Hobart Bosworth as Father

== Music ==
The film featured a theme song entitled "My Annapolis And You" which was composed by Charles Weinberg and Irving Bibo. Also featured on the soundtrack is the song "Girl of My Dreams" which was composed by Sunny Clapp.

== See also ==
- List of early sound feature films (1926–1929)
