= Jeanette Loff =

American actress

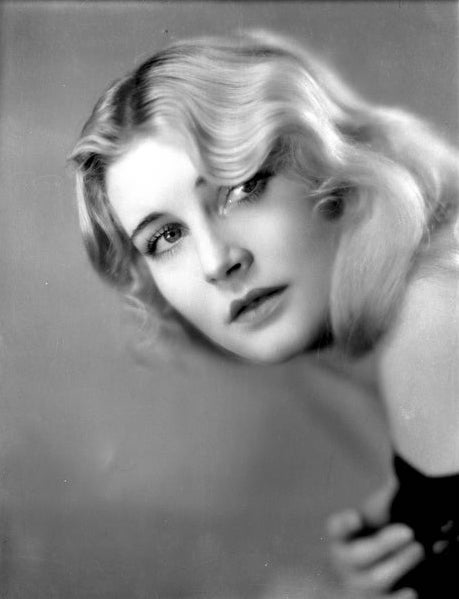
- Loff in 1929
- Born: Janette Clarinda Lov; October 9, 1906; Orofino, Idaho, U.S.
- Died: August 4, 1942 (aged 35); Los Angeles, California, U.S.
- Education: Ellison-White Conservatory
- Occupations: Actress; singer
- Years active: 1927–1934
- Spouses: Harry K. Roseboom (m. 1926; div. 1929) Bertram Eli Friedlob (m. 1936)

Jeanette Loff (born Janette Clarinda Lov; October 9, 1906 – August 4, 1942) was an American actress, musician, and singer who came to prominence for her appearances in several Pathé Exchange and Universal Pictures films in the 1920s.

Born in Idaho, Loff was raised throughout the Pacific Northwest, and began singing professionally as a lyric soprano and performing as an organist while a teenager in Portland, Oregon. She studied music at the Ellison-White Conservatory of Music. After moving to Los Angeles, California, Loff was signed to a film contract by producer Cecil B. DeMille, with Pathé Exchange in 1927. She subsequently signed a contract with Universal Pictures. She appeared in over twenty films during the course of her seven-year career, with lead parts in such films as Hold 'Em Yale (1928) and the controversial crime film Party Girl (1930). She also appeared in the musical King of Jazz (1930) as a vocalist.

Loff formally retired from acting in 1934, with her last screen credit in Joseph Santley's Million Dollar Baby (1934). She died on August 4, 1942, from ammonia poisoning in Los Angeles at the age of 35. Though law enforcement was unable to determine whether her death was an accident or a suicide, Loff's family maintained that she had been murdered.

== Life and career ==
=== 1906–1925: Early life ===
Jeanette Loff was born Janette Clarinda Lov in Orofino, Idaho (Note: Some sources, such as Scott Wilson's Resting Places: The Burial Sites of More Than 14,000 Famous Persons (2016) state Loff was born in "Cronno, Idaho"; however, no documentation of such a town or settlement exists. Loff states in a 1929 Photoplay profile that she was born in the city of Orofino, and 1929 International Motion Picture Almanac also lists her birthplace as Orofino. A 1936 article published in the Chillicothe Constitution-Tribune also states Orofino as her birthplace, and describes it as a "little lumber center in Idaho." However, the Almanac's 1936 issue curiously lists "Cronno" as her birthplace.) to Marius (1878–1961) and Inga (née Loseth; 1885–1971) Lov. She was the eldest of three siblings. Her father, a farmer and a barber who played the violin in local orchestras, was a first-generation American born to Danish parents. (Note: Though newspaper sources claimed that Loff's father Marius was from Copenhagen and a professional violinist, he was in fact born in Minnesota, per his U.S. social services registration card.) Her mother was also a first-generation American, born to Norwegian parents. Marius relocated the family to Ottertail, Minnesota, where Loff lived with her younger sister Irene (1907–1993). (Note: According to U.S. Census records from the 1910 United States Census, Jeanette Loff resided with her parents, Marius (age 30) and Inga (age 25), and her sister Irene (age 3) in Ottertail, Minnesota.) They next moved to Wadena, Saskatchewan, Canada, in 1912 where Marius opened a barbershop. Another sister, Myrtle (1914–1957), was born there. Loff attended Lewiston High School in Lewiston, Idaho.

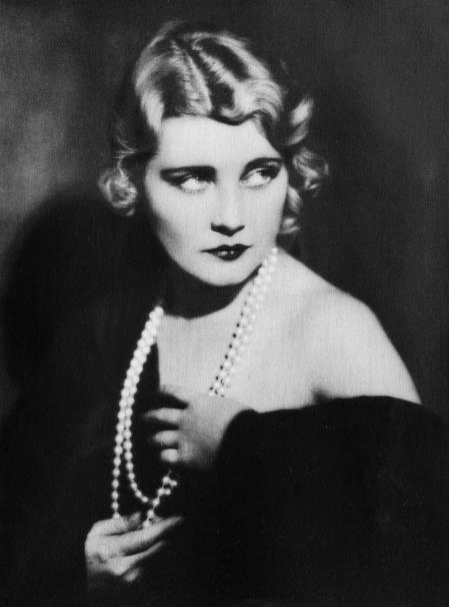
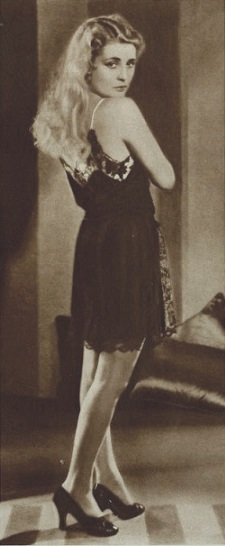
Loff featured in Photoplay, June 1929 (left) and January 1930 (right)

At the age of 11, Loff played the title role in a theatrical production of Snow White and the Seven Dwarfs. At age 16 she was a lyric soprano and had the leading role in an operetta Treasure Hunters. When she was 17 the family moved to Portland, Oregon, where Loff continued her musical education at the Ellison-White Conservatory of Music. She played the organ at theaters in Portland under the name Jan Lov. She sometimes appeared singing theater prologues during vacations from school.

=== 1926–1936: Film career ===
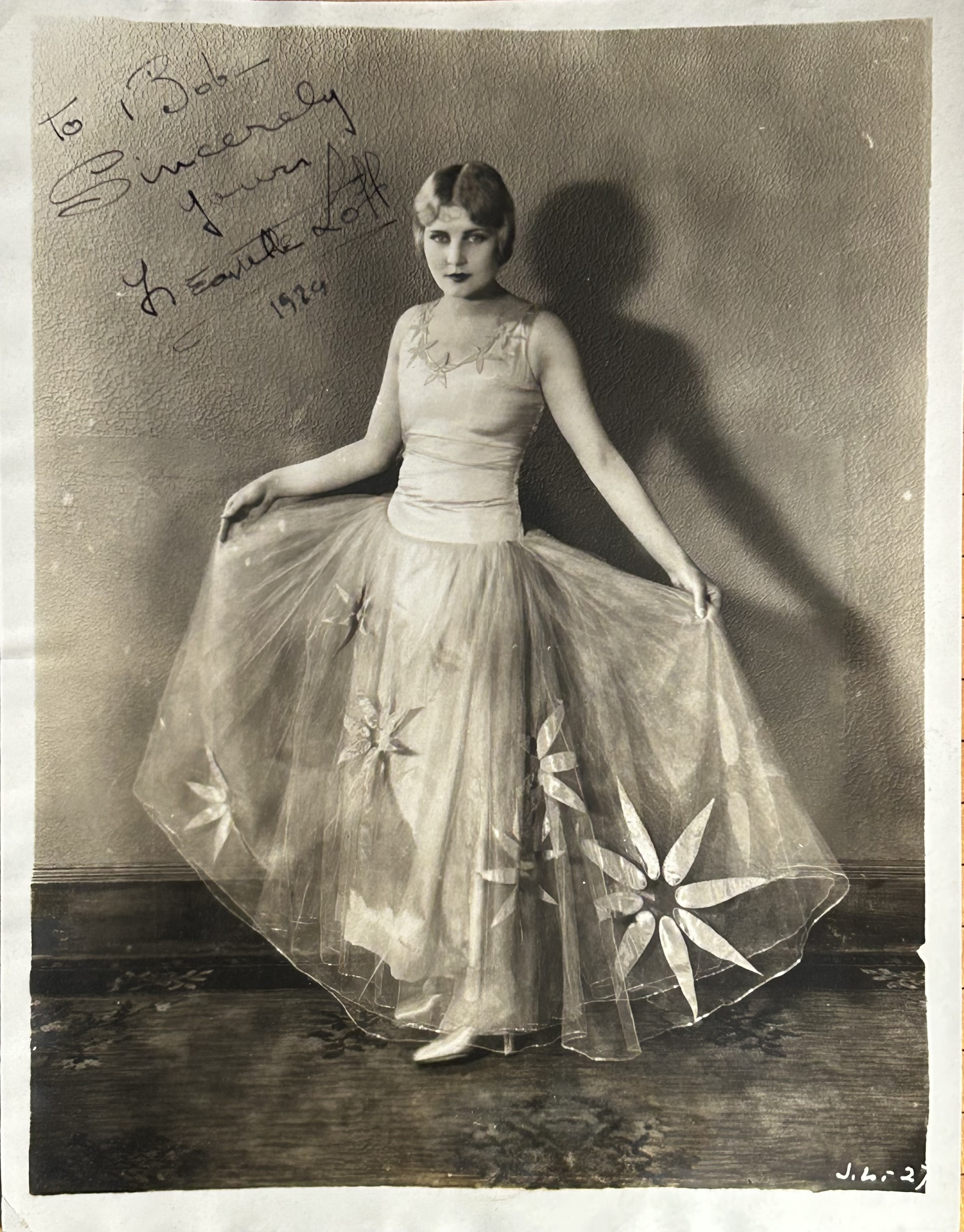
Jeanette Loff (1928)

After moving to Los Angeles, California to pursue a career in entertainment, Loff married jewelry salesman Harry K. Roseboom on October 8, 1926; their divorce was finalized three years later in Portland on October 8, 1929, with Loff claiming Roseboom became jealous and violent toward her because of her budding film career.

Loff's motion picture career began with an uncredited role in the 1927 silent film adaptation of Uncle Tom's Cabin. She was signed to a contract by Cecil B. DeMille with Pathé Exchange, anglicising her surname from Lov to Loff. She was soon cast in ingénue roles in almost every instance, which enticed her to take a break from her movie career and perform on stage. In 1928, Loff was the first person to ride with Santa Claus down Hollywood Boulevard at the first Santa Claus Lane Parade in Los Angeles. In 1930, Pathé opted not to renew Loff's contract, after which she signed with Universal Pictures.

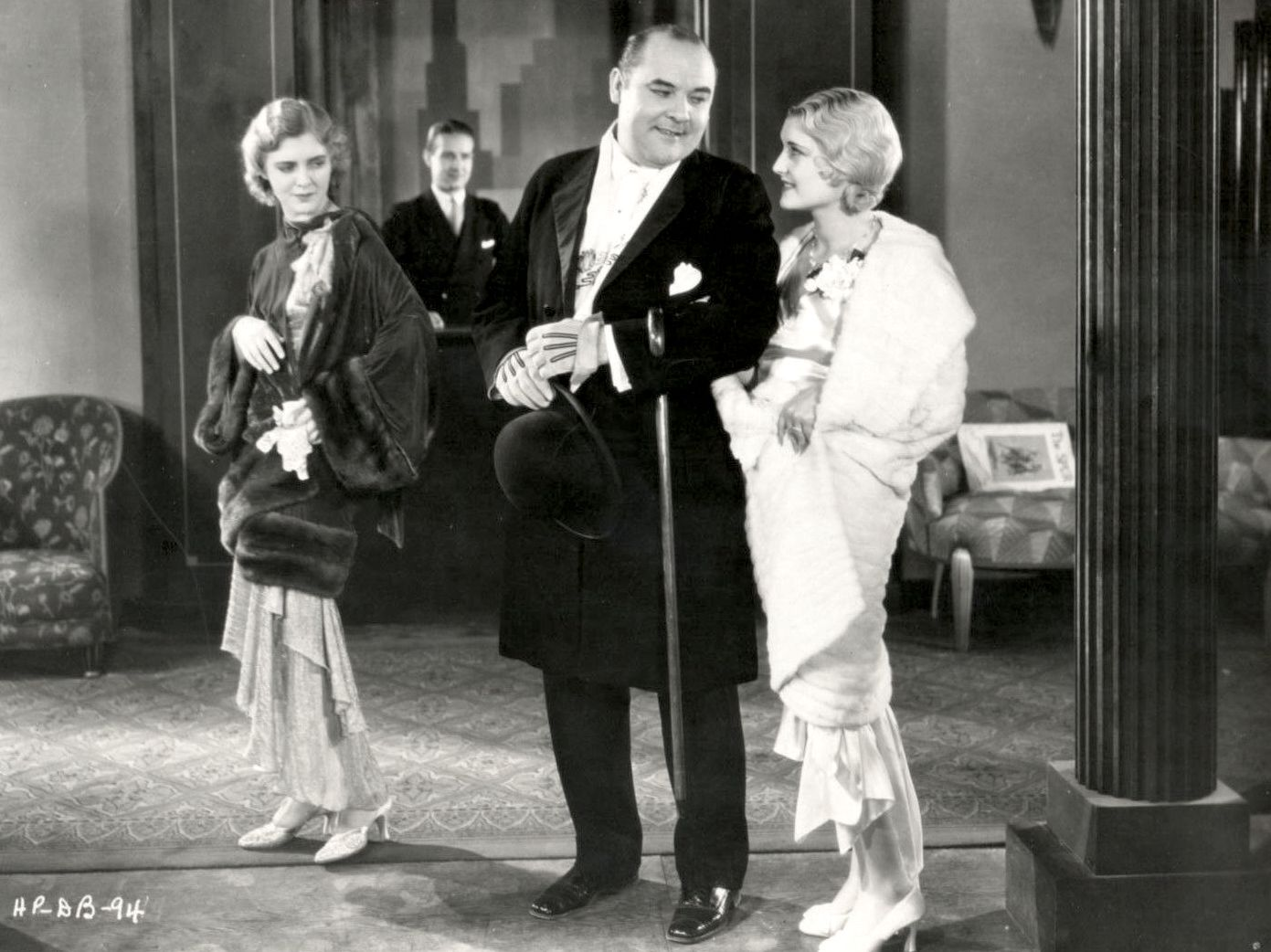
Loff (right) in Party Girl (1930)

Loff's last screen role before she briefly retired was in the Paul Whiteman revue King of Jazz (1930). Her performance as a vocalist in the film was praised by Mordaunt Hall in a New York Times review. She also had a lead role in Party Girl (1930) opposite Douglas Fairbanks Jr., and received critical acclaim for her performance. The film, however, was controversial due to its depiction of an escort agency, and was banned in some U.S. cities.

Loff remained under contract to Universal for some months but made no additional films for the studio. Her absence from the film industry was noted in a 1933 issue of Motion Picture Magazine, in addition to speculation about her personal life:

Jeanette Loff, who has been absent from Hollywood for some time, seems to have been able to make Gilbert Roland forget all the other girls he has been interested in since his break with Norma Talmadge, if you care to believe the idle tongues of the cinema city. Miss Loff is planning to go on tour with Buddy Rogers and his band on the West Coast and later hopes to return to the screen.

=== 1934–1942: Retirement ===
Around 1934, Loff relocated to New York City and appeared in musical plays and with orchestras, before returning to films with a role as a country girl in Flirtation. Her final motion picture performances came in Hide-Out and the Joseph Santley-directed Million Dollar Baby, all released in 1934. After retiring from film, Loff wed Los Angeles businessman Bertram Eli Friedlob in 1936.

== Death ==
On August 1, 1942, Loff ingested ammonia at the Beverly Hills home she shared with husband Friedlob on 9233 Doheny Road. The ammonia ingestion caused severe chemical burns to her throat and mouth. She died three days later of ammonia poisoning on August 4, 1942, in Los Angeles.

The New York Times reported Loff had ingested the ammonia "on the coast," and coroners were unable to determine whether she ingested ammonia either accidentally or intentionally. She had been suffering from a stomach ailment and may have accidentally taken the wrong bottle of medication. While Loff's death could not be patently ruled either accident or suicide, her family maintained that she had been murdered. Loff is interred at Forest Lawn Cemetery in Glendale, California.

== Filmography ==
Key
†	Denotes a lost or presumed lost film.

Year	Title	Role	Notes	Ref.
1926	Young April	Extra	Short film; uncredited	
1926	The Collegians	Student	Short film; uncredited	
1927	Uncle Tom's Cabin	Auction Spectator	Uncredited	
1927	My Friend from India	Marion/Ruth Brooks		
1928	The Man Without a Face †			
1928	Hold 'Em Yale	Helen Bradbury	Alternative title: At Yale	
1928	The Black Ace	Mary		
1928	Man-Made Women	Marjorie		
1928	Annapolis	Betty	Alternative title: Branded a Coward	
1928	Love Over Night	Jeanette Stewart		
1929	The Forty-Five Caliber War	Ruth Walling	Alternative title: 45 Calibre War	
1929	The Sophomore	Barbara Lange	Alternative title: Compromised	
1929	The Racketeer	Millie Chapman	Alternative title: Love's Conquest	
1930	Party Girl	Ellen Powell	Alternative title: Dangerous Business	
1930	The Boudoir Diplomat	Greta		
1930	Fighting Thru	Alice Malden	Alternative titles: Fightin' Ranch, California in 1878	
1930	King of Jazz	Vocalist	Performer of number "The Bridal Veil"	
1934	St. Louis Woman	Lou Morrison, the St. Louis Woman		
1934	A Duke for a Day	Gloria Blossom		
1934	Benny, from Panama	Jeanette Foy		
1934	Hide-Out	Blonde No. 2	Uncredited	
1934	Flirtation	Nancy Poole	Also stars Ben Alexander and Arthur Tracy	
1934	Million Dollar Baby	Rita Ray		

== See also ==
- List of unsolved deaths

== Sources ==
- American Film Institute (1997). The American Film Institute Catalog of Motion Pictures Produced in the United States: Feature Films 1921–1930. University of California Press. ISBN 978-0-520-20969-5.
- Barrios, Richard (1995). A Song in the Dark: The Birth of the Musical Film. Oxford: Oxford University Press. ISBN 978-0-195-08811-3.
- Fleming, E. J. (2008). Paul Bern: The Life and Famous Death of the MGM Director and Husband of Harlow. Jefferson, North Carolina: McFarland. ISBN 978-0-786-45274-3.
- Gevinson, Alan (1997). Within Our Gates: Ethnicity in American Feature Films, 1911-1960. University of California Press. ISBN 978-0-520-20964-0.
- Marling, Karal Ann (2009). Merry Christmas! Celebrating America's Greatest Holiday. Cambridge, Massachusetts: Harvard University Press. ISBN 978-0-674-04062-5.
- Rainey, Bruce (1990). Those Fabulous Serial Heroines: Their Lives and Films. Scarecrow Press. ISBN 978-0-810-81911-5.
- Wilson, Scott (2016). Resting Places: The Burial Sites of More Than 14,000 Famous Persons (3rd ed.). Jefferson, North Carolina: McFarland. p. 451. ISBN 9781476625997.
