= Pauline Alderman =

American musicologist and composer (1893 – 1983)

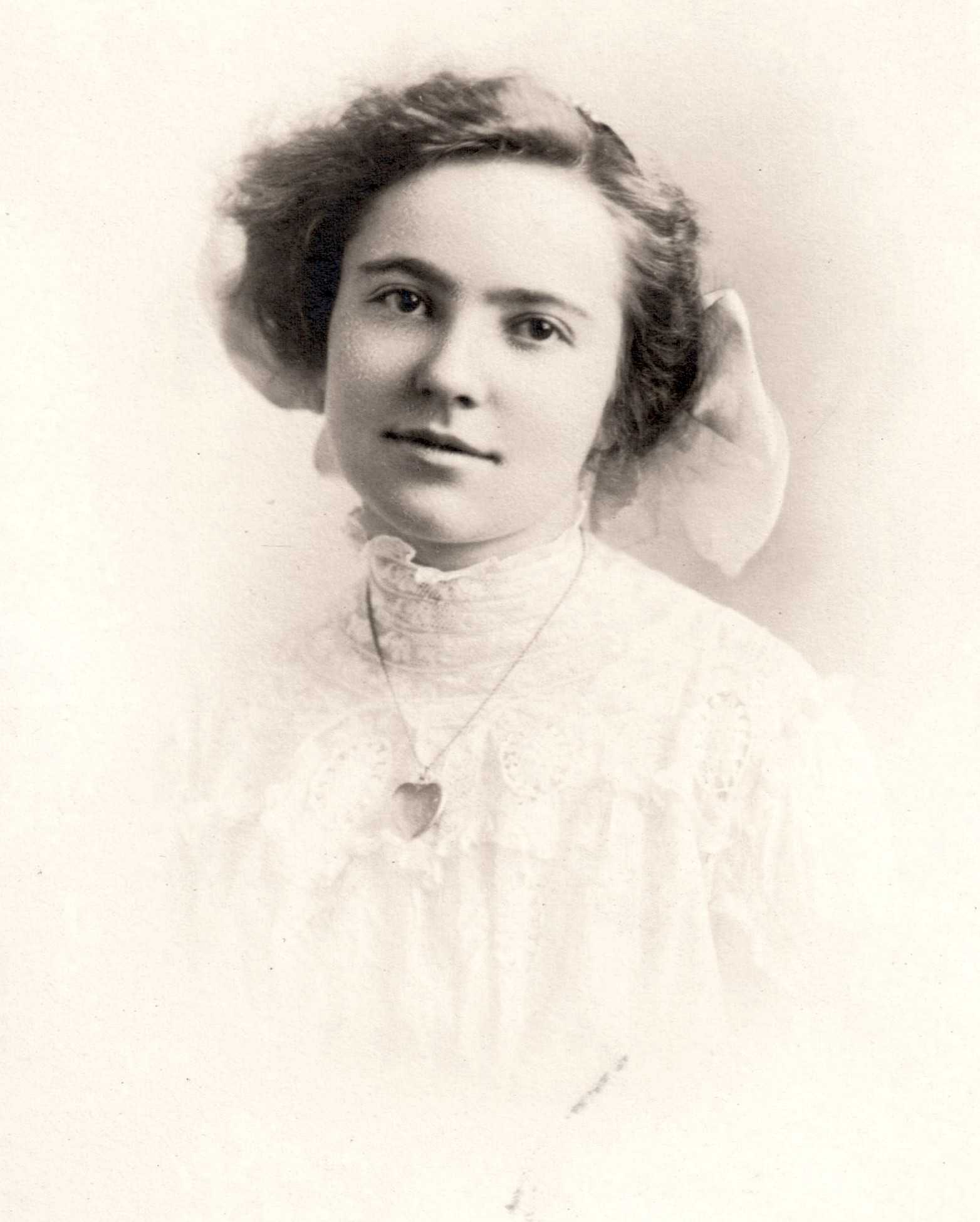
- Alderman in 1911
- Born: Edith Pauline Alderman; January 16, 1893; Lafayette, Oregon, U.S.
- Died: October 11, 1983 (aged 90); Los Angeles, California, U.S.
- Education: Juilliard School; University of Southern California; University of Edinburgh; University of Strasbourg
- Occupations: Musicologist, composer, educator

Edith Pauline Alderman (January 16, 1893 – October 11, 1983) was an American musicologist and composer. She was the founder and the first Chairwoman of the Department of Music History and Literature (musicology) at the University of Southern California, between 1952 and 1960.

== Biography ==
=== Early life and education ===
Alderman was born in Lafayette, Oregon and received training in piano and organ, as well as in English and German literature in her youth. She graduated from Washington High School in Portland, Oregon. Her first teaching career started at the McMinnville junior high school in 1916 where she taught English literature. Alderman further taught history and music in Portland and attended summer music classes at the University of California, Berkeley in Berkeley, California in 1918. Between 1920 and 1923 she became a student of Carolyn Alchin, while she was teaching at the Ellison-White Conservatory of Music, then newly founded conservatory in Portland.

Alderman attended New York Institute of Musical Art (later Juilliard School of Music), where she was a student of Percy Goetschius, in 1923. A year later, she started to teach piano, music theory and history of music at the Pomona College in Claremont, California. Later, from 1928 to 1930, she taught at the University of Washington, then music and literature at the University of Southern California (USC) in Los Angeles, where she earned her Ph.D. degree. Alderman had classes with Arnold Schönberg.

=== Later life and death ===
She moved to Europe in 1938, where she decided to take lessons from Donald Francis Tovey at the University of Edinburgh. She moved to at the University of Strasbourg for doctoral studies. She returned to Los Angeles in 1940, where she was back teaching at the University of Southern California (USC). While teaching, she had composition lessons with Ernst Toch and Lucien Cailliet. Alderman presented her dissertation at USC which she named Antoine Boësset and the Air de Cour and in 1946 she received the first PhD degree in music at USC. In 1952, she became the first Chairwoman of the Department of Music History and Literature which she founded, until her retirement in 1960. She died in Los Angeles, California.

== Legacy ==
Quote from the USC publication Musicology at USC, A Handbook for Graduate Students 2007–2008:

The study of musicology at the University of Southern California has a long and excellent history. Its founding and early development are intertwined with the remarkable career of Pauline Alderman (1893–1983). In 1930 she was appointed to the faculty of USC's "College of Music," where she taught primarily theory and composition. Her interests then turned to music history, and she left USC to study at the University of Edinburgh and later at the University of Strasbourg under the guidance of Yvonne Rokseth. Her researches were interrupted when war descended upon Europe, whereupon she returned to Los Angeles and to USC. Following the war she completed her dissertation, "Anthoine Boësset and the Air de Cour", for which she was awarded in 1946 the first Ph.D. degree in music at this university. She was the founder of the Department of Music History and Literature and its Chair from 1952 until her retirement in 1960. From then until her death in 1983, Pauline Alderman remained an inspiring presence in the lives of students and faculty at USC, and as guest lecturer at colleges and universities across the country.

In addition to her songs, Alderman composed an opera Bombasto Furioso (1938) and the operetta Come On Over (1940), which won the ASCAP Award for 1940, the first time the prize was won by a woman.

The International Congress on Women in Music sponsored by International Alliance for Women in Music has established the Pauline Alderman Award for musicological and journalistic works on women in music in 1982.

Alderman's students included composer Williametta Spencer.

== Works ==
- Antoine Boesset and the Air de Cour, Dissertation, 1946
- A Survey of Vocal Literature (1952)
- Theme and Variations (1943–45)
- Pioneers of Music (1950)
- We Build a School of Music (1989) (For all intents, a rousing autobiography centered on her years at the School of Music.)
