= The Sophomore =

1929 film

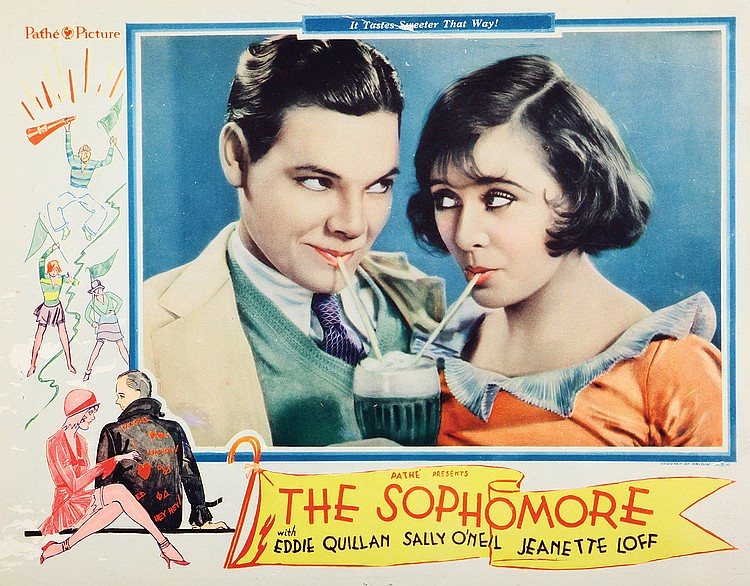
- Lobby card
- Directed by: Leo McCarey
- Written by: Corey Ford; T.H. Wenning; Joseph F. Poland; Walter DeLeon; Earl Baldwin
- Produced by: Joseph P. Kennedy
- Starring: Eddie Quillan; Sally O'Neil; Jeanette Loff
- Cinematography: John J. Mescall
- Edited by: Doane Harrison
- Production company: Pathé Exchange
- Distributed by: Pathé Exchange
- Release date: August 24, 1929
- Running time: 73 minutes
- Country: United States
- Languages: Sound (All-Talking); English intertitles

The Sophomore is a 1929 American sound all-talking pre-Code comedy film directed by Leo McCarey and starring Eddie Quillan, Sally O'Neil, and Jeanette Loff. Made during the early sound era, it was shot using the RCA Photophone sound system. The film survives in an mute print of the alternate sound version known as an International Sound Version which was meant to be played along with Vitaphone discs. It is not known whether the Vitaphone type soundtrack discs to the International Sound Version are extant.

== Plot ==
Sophomore Joe Collins returns to college for his second year, but loses the money for his tuition in a craps game. To raise the money he takes a job working as a soda jerk. When he loses that job, he is supported financially by his co-worker Margie Callahan without his knowledge. Eventually, after a major college football game, he discovers the truth.

== Cast ==
- Eddie Quillan as Joe Collins
- Sally O'Neil as Margie Callahan
- Stanley Smith as Tom Weck
- Jeanette Loff as Barbara Lange
- Russell Gleason as Dutch
- Sarah Padden as Mrs. Collins
- Brooks Benedict as Dan Willis
- Spec O'Donnell as Joe's Nephew
- Walter O'Keefe as Gabriel McAfee - Radio Announcer
- Jimmy Aldine as Student
- Lew Ayres as Sophomore Fraternity Brother
- Ray Cooke as Sophomore Fraternity Brother
- Stuart Erwin as Radio Broadcast Technician
- Dorothy Granger as Co-Ed
- Marian Marsh as Co-Ed
- Grady Sutton as Cupie - Freshman Fraternity Brother
- Gretta Tuttle as Co-Ed
- Dorothy Ward as Co-Ed

== Music ==
The film features a theme song entitled "Little By Little" which was composed by Robert Emmett Dolan (as Bobby Dolan) and Walter O'Keefe. In the film it is sung by Eddie Quillan and Sally O'Neil.

== See also ==
- List of early sound feature films (1926–1929)

== Bibliography ==
- Munden, Kenneth White. The American Film Institute Catalog of Motion Pictures Produced in the United States, Part 1. University of California Press, 1997.
