= Behind the Museum Café =

Restaurant in Portland, Oregon, U.S.

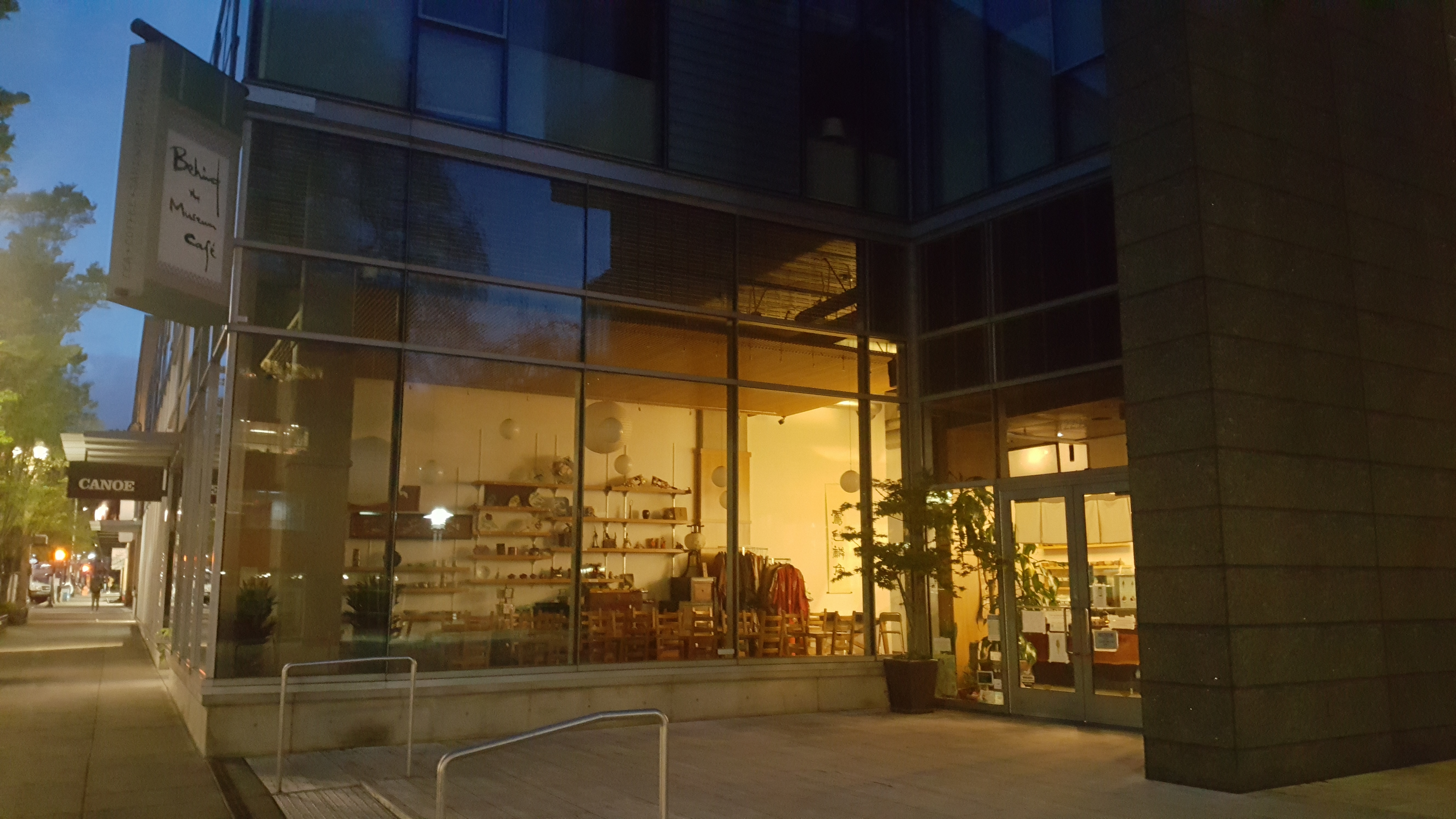
- Exterior of the original cafe, 2022
- Interactive map of Behind the Museum Café

Restaurant information
- Established: 2011
- Owner: Tomoe Horibuchi
- Head chef: Tomoe Horibuchi
- Food type: Japanese
- Location: 1229 SW 10th Ave, Portland, Multnomah, Oregon, 97205, United States
- Coordinates: 45.5164°N 122.6843°W
- Website: behindthemuseumcafe.com

Behind the Museum Café is a cafe with two locations in Portland, Oregon, United States. Owner Tomoe Horibuchi opened the original restaurant in 2011 and followed with a second in 2019.

== Description ==
The original cafe, located west of the Portland Art Museum serves coffee, tea and Japanese small plates, including baguette sandwiches, sweets, onigiri, and otsumami. The drink menu includes espresso, iced coffees, lattes, and other milk drinks; tea options include matcha and hōjicha lattes. A second location in the former Guild Theatre serves matcha and homemade sweets.

Walker MacMurdo of Willamette Week described the cafe as "inconspicuous" and "a microcosm of Japanese culture: a one-stop shop for imported antiques and kimonos and contemporary ceramics, pottery, calligraphy and art in the Japanese tradition". The newspaper has said, "Antique jewelry boxes, kimonos and kokeshi dolls line the walls, and the mix of PSU students, museumgoers and fortunate wanderers seated within are never in a rush to leave."

== History ==
The original Behind the Museum opened in a former Boyd's cafe in 2011. In 2019, owner Tomoe Horibuchi confirmed plans to open a second location called Book of Tea Café in the Japanese bookstore Kinokuniya, within the former Guild Theatre. The second location opened on August 21, 2019.

== Reception ==
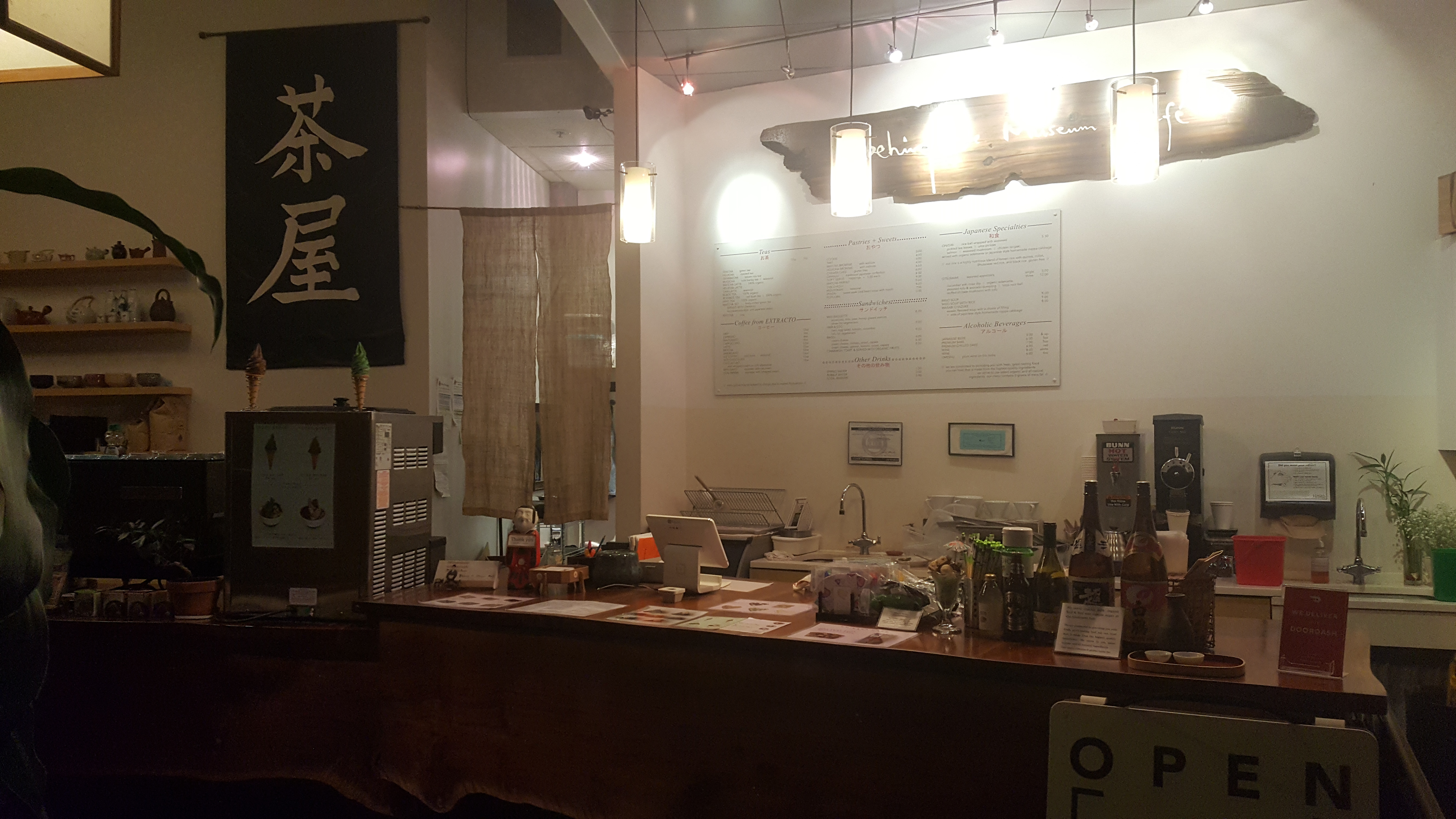
Interior of the original cafe, 2022

In The Oregonian's 2017 list of the ten best coffee shops in downtown Portland, Samantha Bakall described the Behind the Museum as "a serene, almost monastic coffee shop lined with Japanese art and ceramics" and wrote, "Behind the Museum Cafe is one of our favorite cafes in the city. With its high, airy ceilings and lengthy menu of Japanese teas, temple-style snacks and Extracto coffee drinks, it's the perfect place to have a relaxing cup of matcha or catch up on work."

Seiji Nanbu included the cafe in Eater Portland's 2020 list of "where to find mesmerizing matcha treats in Portland and beyond". The business was also included in Eater Portland's 2022 overview of "where to eat and drink in downtown Portland".

== See also ==
- List of Japanese restaurants
- List of restaurant chains in the United States
