= The Boss of Rustler's Roost =

1928 film

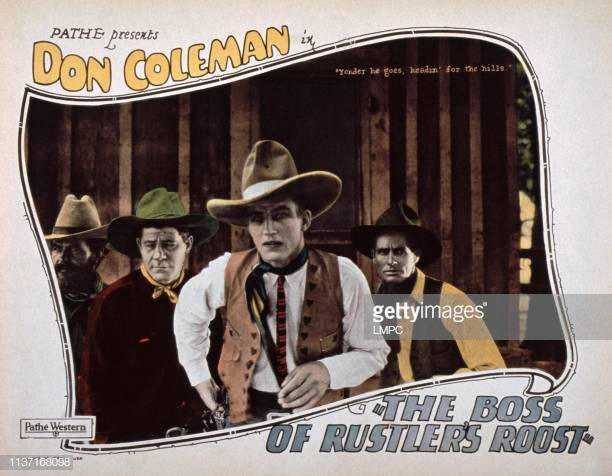
- Directed by: Leo D. Maloney
- Written by: Ford Beebe; William Dawson Hoffman
- Produced by: Leo D. Maloney
- Starring: Eugenia Gilbert; Ben Corbett; Tom London
- Cinematography: Edward A. Kull
- Edited by: Joseph Kane
- Production company: Leo Maloney Productions
- Distributed by: Pathé Exchange
- Release date: January 22, 1928
- Running time: 50 minutes
- Country: United States
- Languages: Silent; English intertitles

The Boss of Rustler's Roost is a 1928 American silent Western film directed by Leo D. Maloney and starring Eugenia Gilbert, Ben Corbett and Tom London.

== Cast ==
- Don Coleman as 'Smiler' Cavanaugh
- Eugenia Gilbert as Fay Everman
- Ben Corbett as 'Tip' Reardon
- Tom London as 'Pronto Giles', the Foreman
- Al Hart as Henry Everman
- Dick Hatton as Bill Everman
- Frank Clark as Jud Porter
- William Bertram as Sheriff Drain
- Chet Ryan as Ranger
