= The Black Ace (1928 film) =

1928 film directed by Leo D. Maloney

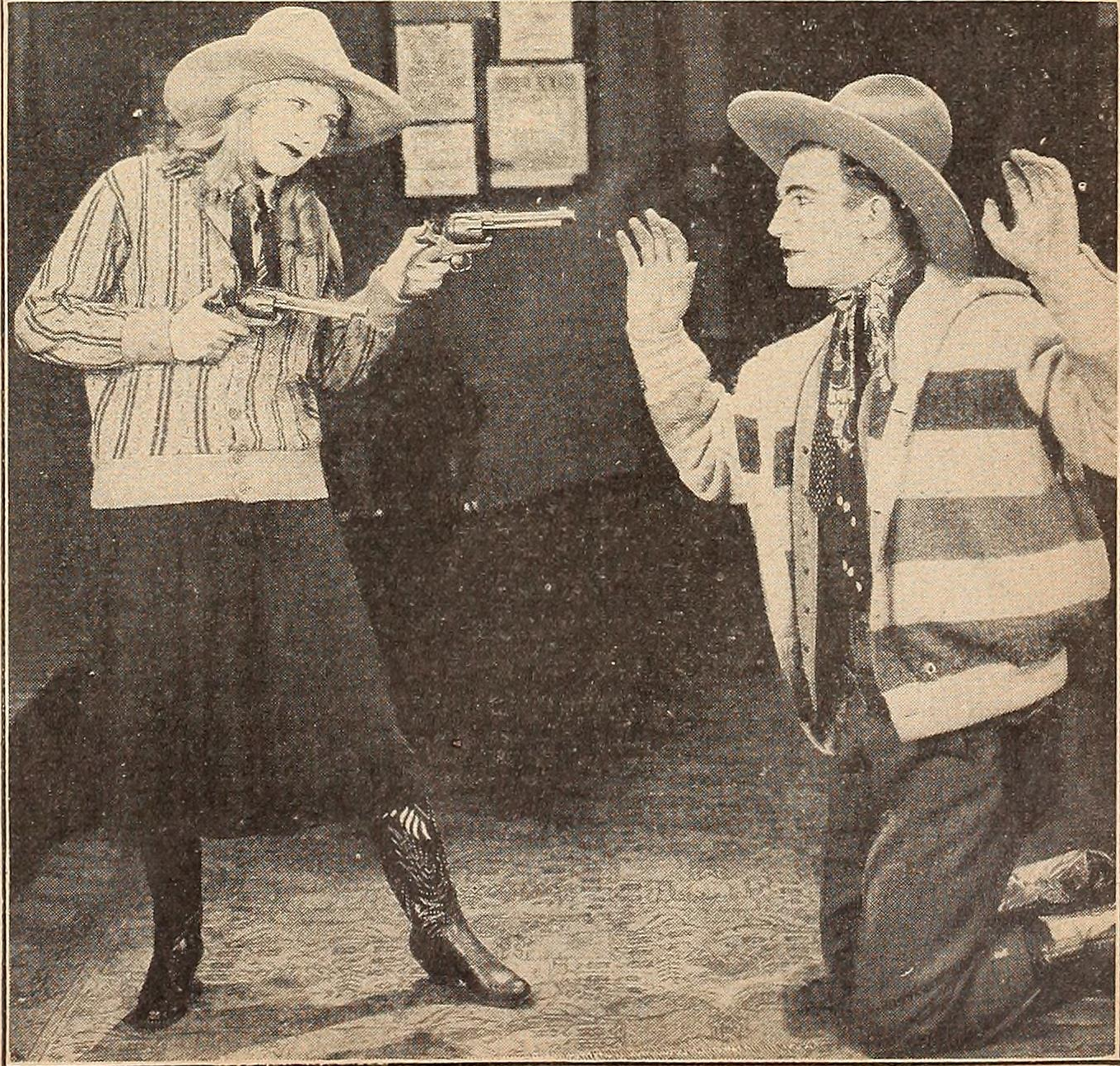
- Jeanette Loff and Don Coleman
- Directed by: Leo D. Maloney
- Written by: Ford Beebe
- Produced by: Leo D. Maloney
- Starring: Don Coleman; Jeanette Loff; J.P. McGowan
- Cinematography: Edward A. Kull
- Edited by: Joseph Kane
- Production company: Leo Maloney Productions
- Distributed by: Pathé Exchange
- Release date: September 2, 1928
- Running time: 60 minutes
- Country: United States
- Languages: Silent; English intertitles

The Black Ace is a 1928 American silent Western film, directed by Leo D. Maloney and starring Don Coleman, Jeanette Loff, and J.P. McGowan.

== Cast ==
- Don Coleman as Dan Stockton
- Jeanette Loff
- Billy Butts
- J.P. McGowan
- Noble Johnson
- William Steele
- Ben Corbett
- Ed Jones
