= Love Over Night =

1928 film

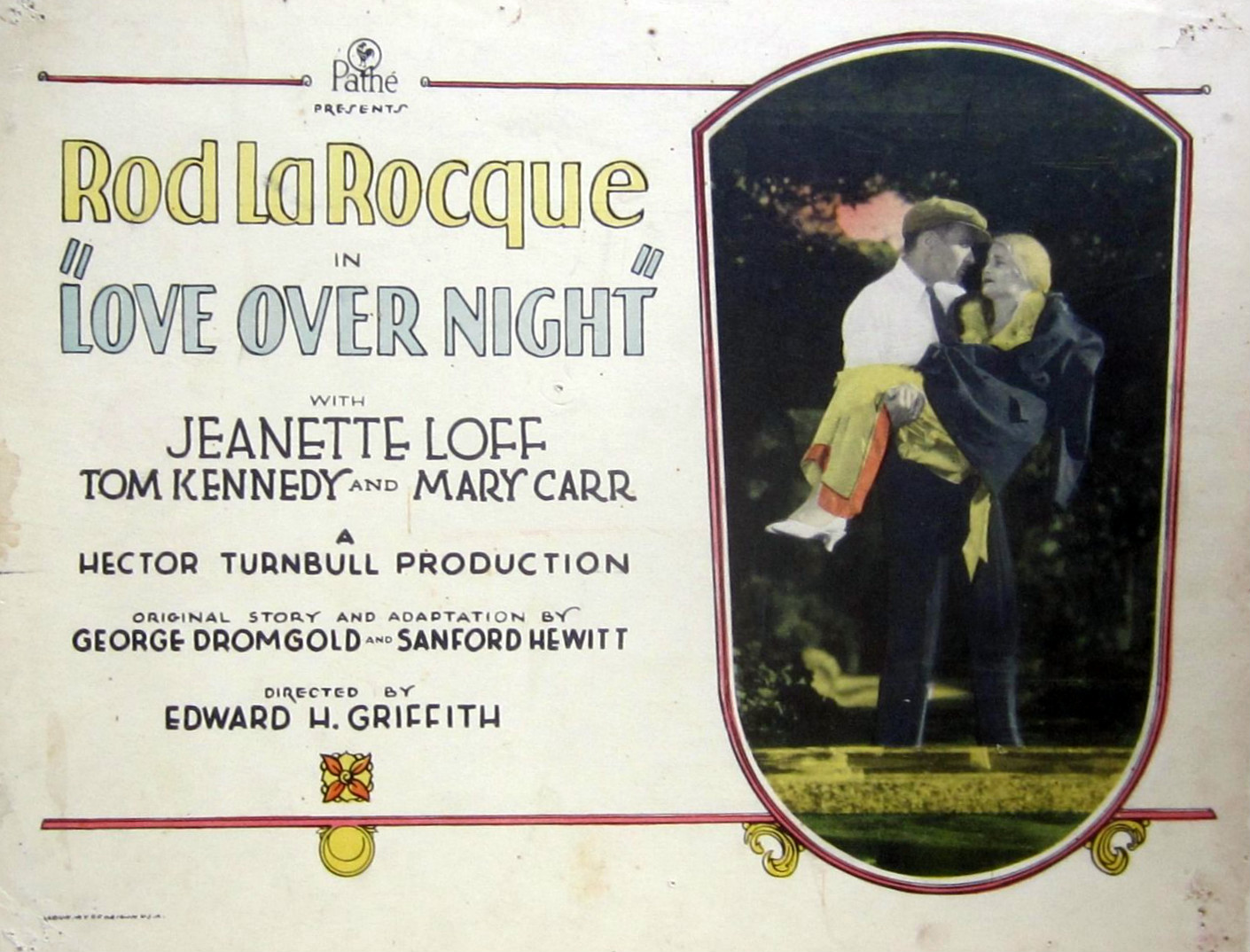
- Lobby card
- Directed by: Edward H. Griffith; E. J. Babille (assistant)
- Written by: George Dromgold (writer); Sanford Hewitt (writer); John W. Krafft (intertitles)
- Produced by: Hector Turnbull
- Starring: Rod La Rocque
- Cinematography: John J. Mescall; Burnett Guffey (ass't camera)
- Edited by: Harold McLernon
- Distributed by: Pathé Exchange
- Release date: November 25, 1928
- Running time: 60 minutes; 6 reels
- Country: United States
- Language: Silent (English intertitles)

Love Over Night is a 1928 American silent comedy film produced and distributed by Pathé Exchange and starring Rod La Rocque. The film was directed by Edward H. Griffith.

A print of Love Over Night is said to be held at the Museum of Modern Art, New York.

== Cast ==
- Rod La Rocque as Richard Hill
- Jeanette Loff as Jeanette Stewart
- Richard Tucker as Richard T. Thorne
- Tom Kennedy as Detective
- Mary Carr as Grandmother
