= An Eastern Westerner =

1920 film

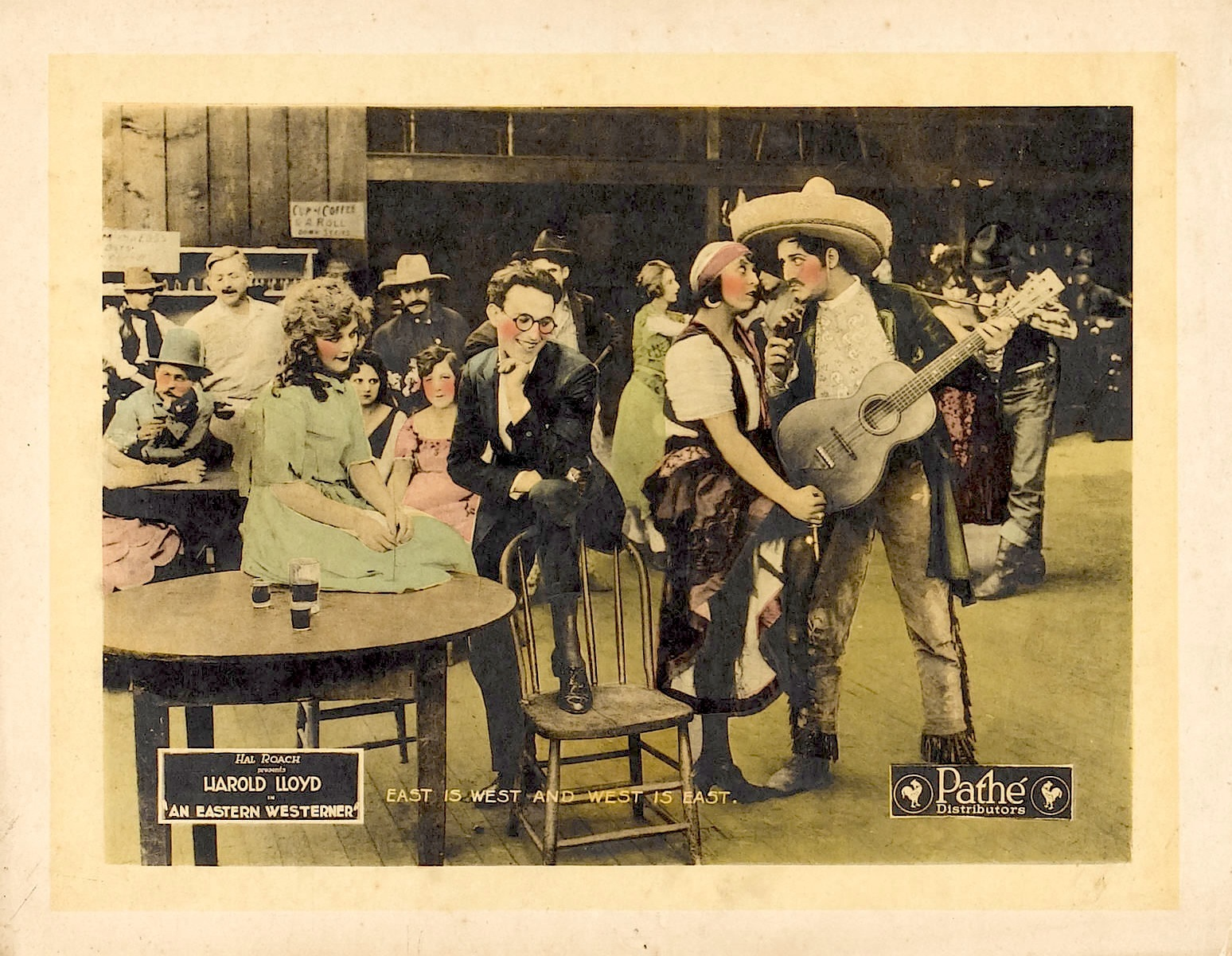
- Lobby card
- Directed by: Hal Roach
- Written by: Frank Terry; H.M. Walker
- Produced by: Hal Roach
- Starring: Harold Lloyd
- Cinematography: Walter Lundin
- Production company: Hal Roach Studios
- Distributed by: Pathé Exchange
- Release date: May 2, 1920
- Running time: 20 minutes
- Country: United States
- Languages: Silent; English intertitles

An Eastern Westerner is a 1920 American silent Western comedy film featuring Harold Lloyd. A copy of the film exists.

== Plot ==
An Eastern Westerner (1920)

The Boy is the hedonistic son of wealthy eastern parents. One night when he returns home at 2 a.m. from a night of carousing at a dance hall, The Boy's strait-laced father sends him packing to his uncle's ranch in a small western community called Piute Pass. Upon arriving there, The Boy becomes smitten with a local girl. She and her father are seeking work from the villainous Tiger Lip Tompkins who owns half the town and terrorizes its people. He has lecherous plans for The Girl. When she rejects Tompkins' advances, Tompkins holds The Girl's father hostage in an upstairs room in a local saloon. The Boy frees The Girl's father and is hotly pursued by a large posse of Tompkins' white-hood clad hirelings who intend to run him out of the state. Using a number of evasive ploys, The Boy eludes the posse and escapes with The Girl. The film ends with The Boy drawing an engagement ring on The Girl's finger to signify his romantic intentions.

== Cast ==
- Harold Lloyd as The Boy
- Mildred Davis as The Girl
- Noah Young as Tiger Lip Tompkins, The Bully, Leader of the Masked Angels
- James T. Kelley (as Jim Kelley)
- Sammy Brooks
- Mark Jones
- Wallace Howe
- Belle Mitchell as Saloon Girl (uncredited)
- William Gillespie as Dance Hall Manager / Mexican with Knife (uncredited)
- Charles Stevenson as The Headwaiter / Card Player (uncredited)
- Ben Corbett as Rope Twirler (uncredited)

== See also ==
- Harold Lloyd filmography
