= Fighting Thru =

1930 film

- Original theatrical poster
- Directed by: William Nigh
- Written by: Jack Natteford
- Starring: Ken Maynard; Jeanette Loff; Wallace MacDonald; Carmelita Geraghty
- Distributed by: Tiffany Pictures
- Release date: December 16, 1930
- Running time: 58 minutes
- Country: United States
- Language: English

Fighting Thru, also known as California in 1878, is a 1930 American pre-Code Western film directed by William Nigh and starring Ken Maynard, Jeanette Loff, and Wallace MacDonald. Its plot follows a gold miner from the California Gold Rush who attempts to save his partner and vie for the affections of a young frontier woman. The film was released by Tiffany Pictures in December 1930, and re-released in 1937 through Amity Pictures.

== Plot ==
Daniel Barton is a recruit of the California Gold Rush who finds that his mining partner, Tennessee Malden, has left town to meet Daniel's departed sister, Alice. Eager to stop their meeting, Daniel pursues Tennessee to a tavern where he finds him playing cards with Fox Tyson, a gambler, Queenie, a barmaid, and Ace Brady, the tavern owner. All three are conspiring to swindle Tennessee of his money.

Later that night, Fox murders Tennessee at his cabin, and frames Daniel as being responsible for the murder. Alice and Ace attest to Fox's version of events. Daniel escapes and subsequently uncovers that Ace and Queenie are planning to obtain power of attorney as a means of diverting Tennessee's interest in Alice. Dan rushes to meet Alice, and convinces her of his innocence in Tennessee's death.

Daniel saves Alice from a stagecoach crash orchestrated by Fox, after which he subdues Ace in a fight at a saloon. The sheriff arrives at the saloon to vindicate Daniel, having heard Fox's dying confession after the stagecoach accident. Ace shoots Daniel, but the gunshot does not kill him. Some time later, Daniel and Alice marry.

== Cast ==
- Ken Maynard as Daniel Barton
- Jeanette Loff as Alice Malden
- Wallace MacDonald as George "Tennessee" Malden
- Carmelita Geraghty as Queenie
- William L. Thorne as Ace Thorne
- Charles King as Fox Tyson - Henchman
- Fred Burns as Sheriff Miles Clay
- Tom Bay as Miner

== Release ==
Fighting Thru was released on December 16, 1930, in the United States.

=== Critical response ===
The Morning Call praised the film, writing that it "is the best Western that has been produced to date." A review in the Cumberland Evening Times similarly praised it as a "Western of high calibre, with plenty of calibre in the form of flashy revolvers which are pleasantly and excitingly playful throughout the picture."
