= Hidden Gold (1932 film) =

1932 film

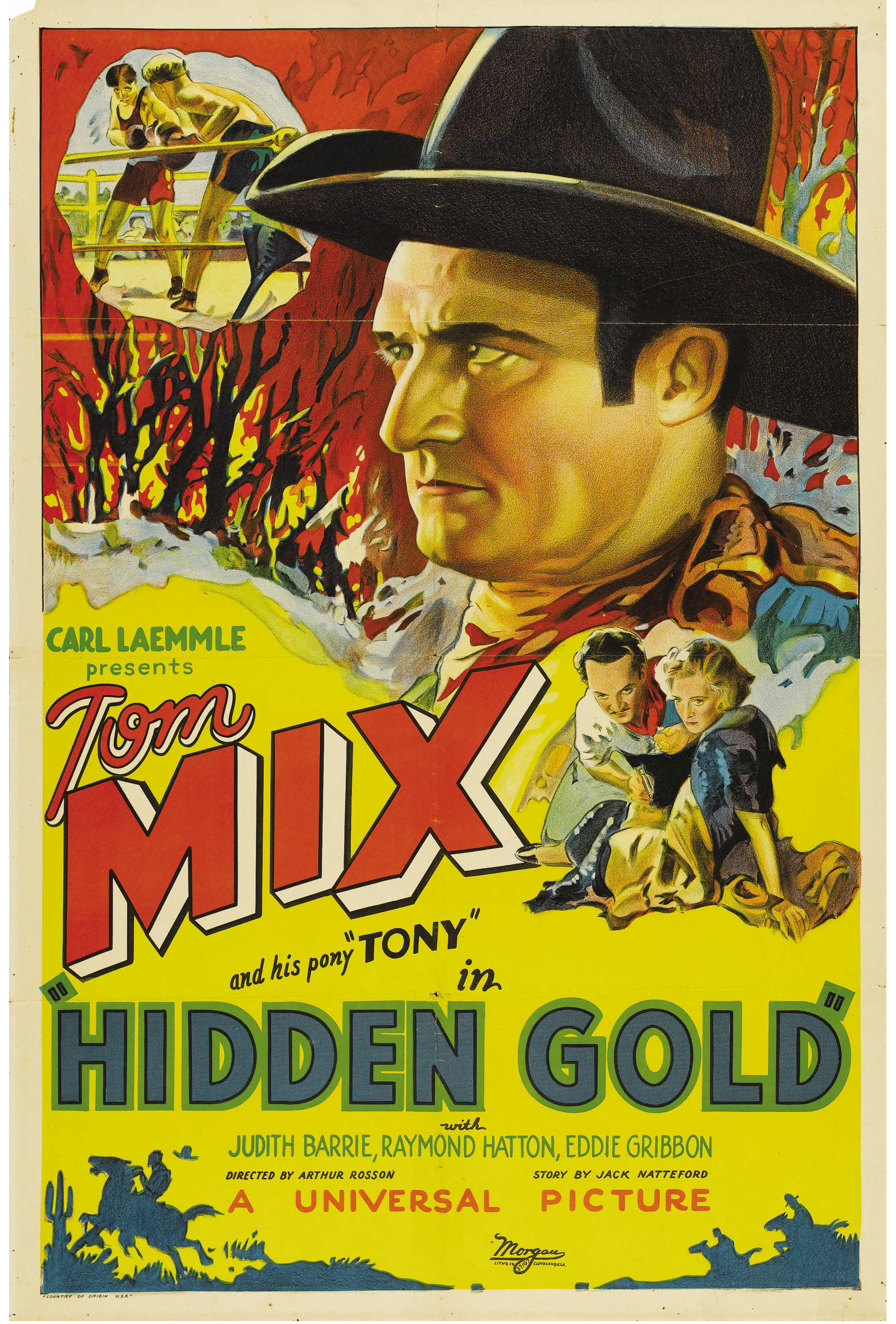
- Theatrical release poster
- Directed by: Arthur Rosson
- Screenplay by: James Mulhauser; Jack Natteford
- Story by: Jack Natteford
- Produced by: Carl Laemmle, Jr. Stanley Bergerman
- Starring: Tom Mix; Judith Barrie; Raymond Hatton; Eddie Gribbon; Donald Kirke; Wallis Clark
- Cinematography: Daniel B. Clark
- Edited by: Maurice Pivar
- Music by: Sam Perry; Heinz Roemheld
- Production company: Universal Pictures
- Distributed by: Universal Pictures
- Release date: November 3, 1932
- Running time: 55 minutes
- Country: United States
- Language: English

Hidden Gold is a 1932 American Western film directed by Arthur Rosson and written by James Mulhauser and Jack Natteford. The film stars Tom Mix, Judith Barrie, Raymond Hatton, Eddie Gribbon, Donald Kirke and Wallis Clark. The film was released on November 3, 1932, by Universal Pictures.

== Plot ==
Doc Griffin and his two henchmen rob a bank and quickly hide the loot before they are apprehended. The handsome owner of the horse ranch Nora Lane loses all her money because of this. The police have Lane's employee Tom Marley infiltrate the prison with the robbers, hoping the thieves will tell Marley where the loot is hidden. When the trio manages to escape from prison, Marley has to hide his cover longer. His undercover action works too well, however, and both Lane and the police think he has actually joined the criminals. Marley then steals horses from Lane's ranch, and she is kidnapped by Griffin who takes her to the woods to find the loot. When he accidentally starts a forest fire, Griffin shoots his henchmen to keep the money for himself. Lane, meanwhile, escapes and runs off with Marley's horse Tony Jr. Marley herself fights through the burning forest, knocks Griffin down and takes the money to a safe place. He frees 'Spike' Weber after the other robber 'Big Ben' Cooper dies. The story ends well: Marley proposes to Lane and returns the loot to the bank.

== Cast ==
- Tom Mix as Tom Marley
- Judith Barrie as Nora Lane
- Raymond Hatton as Spike Webber
- Eddie Gribbon as Big Ben Cooper
- Donald Kirke as Doc Griffin
- Wallis Clark as Jones
- Roy Moore as The Warden
- Tony Jr. the Horse as Tony
