= Ben Corbett =

American actor (1892–1961)

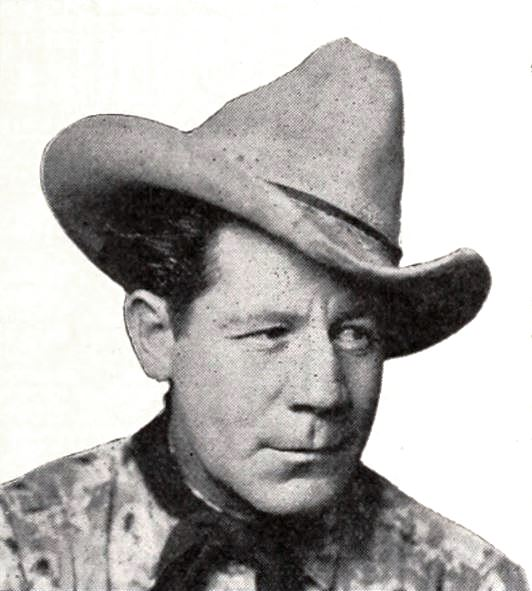
- 1925 magazine
- Born: February 6, 1892; Hudson, Illinois, U.S.
- Died: May 19, 1961 (aged 69); Hollywood, California, U.S.
- Occupation: Actor
- Years active: 1915-1956

Ben Corbett (February 6, 1892 – May 19, 1961) was an American film actor. He appeared in more than 280 films between 1915 and 1956. He was born in Hudson, Illinois and died in Hollywood, California.

Corbett was a trophy-winning rodeo participant. He began working in films as a riding double.

== Partial filmography ==
- Lightning Bryce (1919)
- An Eastern Westerner (1920)
- Fight It Out (1920)
- The Man with the Punch (1920)
- The Trail of the Hound (1920)
- Kickaroo (1921)
- The Fightin' Fury (1921)
- The Kingfisher's Roost (1921)
- The Cactus Kid (1921)
- Who Was the Man? (1921)
- Lure of the Gold (1922)
- Don Quickshot of the Rio Grande (1923)
- The Red Warning (1923)
- The Riddle Rider (1924)
- The Man from Wyoming (1924)
- The Phantom Horseman (1924)
- The Sagebrush Lady (1925)
- The Law of the Snow Country (1926)
- The Roaring Road (1926)
- The Red Raiders (1927)
- The Man from Hard Pan (1927)
- The Black Ace (1928)
- The Bronc Stomper (1928)
- The Boss of Rustler's Roost (1928)
- Put 'Em Up (1928)
- .45 Calibre War (1929)
- Men Without Law (1930)
- Romance of the West (1930)
- The Phantom of the Desert (1930)
- Westward Bound (1930)
- The Lonesome Trail (1930)
- Breed of the West (1930)
- The Kid from Arizona (1931)
- Wild West Whoopee (1931)
- The Hawk (1931)
- The Law of the Tong (1931)
- West of Cheyenne (1931)
- Riders of the Rio (1931)
- The Texas Tornado (1932)
- 45 Calibre Echo (1932)
- Tex Takes a Holiday (1932)
- The Reckless Rider (1932)
- Guns for Hire (1932)
- Trouble Busters (1933)
- Western Racketeers (1934)
- The Border Menace (1934)
- Fighting Through (1934)
- Border Vengeance (1935)
- The Outlaw Tamer (1935)
- Empty Saddles (1936)
- Gun Smoke (1936)
- It Happened Out West (1937)
- Texas Trail (1937)
- Six-Gun Trail (1938)
- Lawless Valley (1938)
- The Fighting Renegade (1939)
- Thank Your Lucky Stars (1943)
- Law Men (1944)
