= Studio Building (Portland, Oregon) =

Building in Portland, Oregon, U.S.

Coordinates: 45.5186°N 122.6821°W

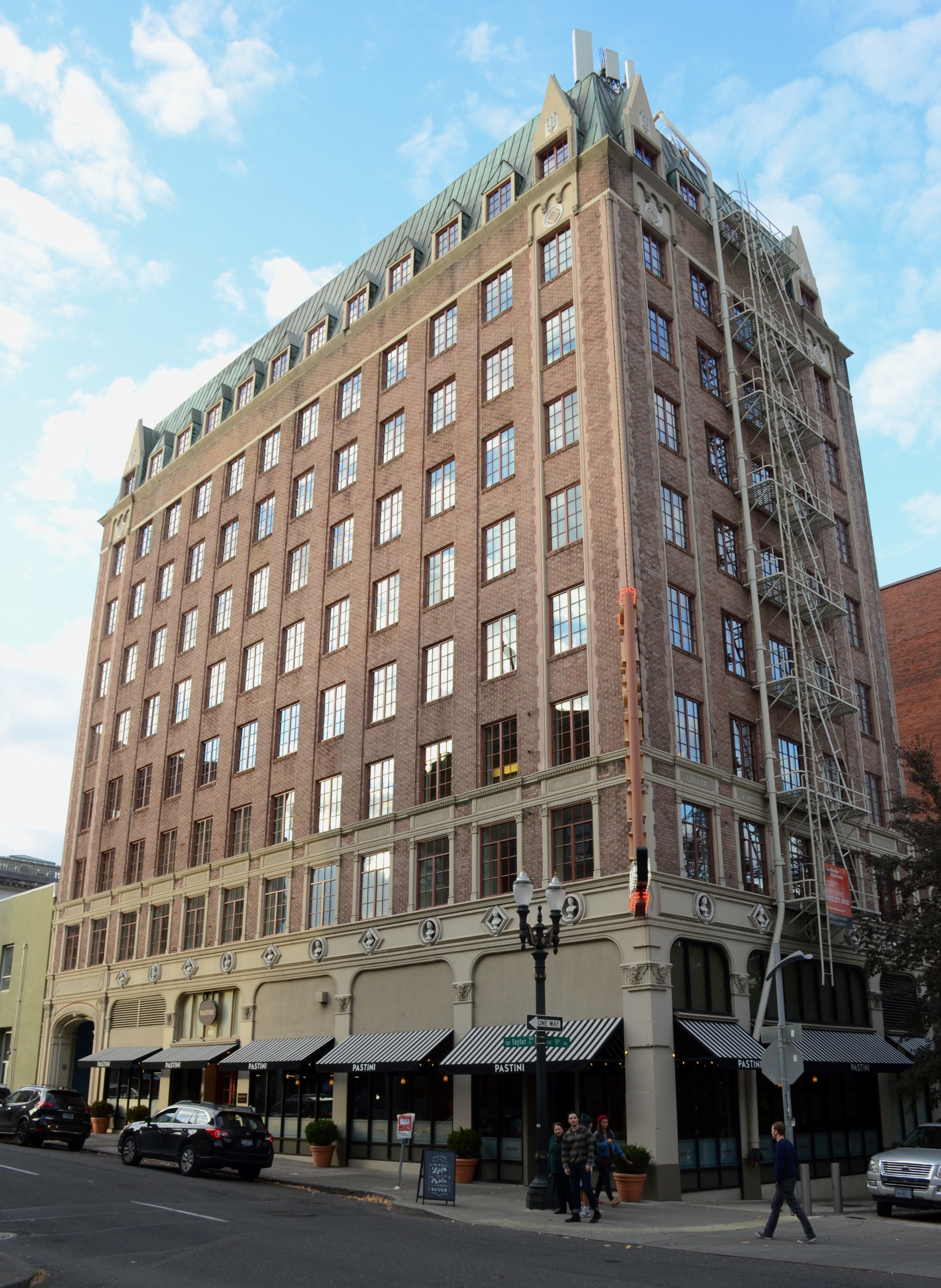
- From the south in 2019
- Interactive map of the Studio Building area

General information
- Location: Portland, Oregon, United States
- Completed: 1927; 99 years ago

Technical details
- Floor count: 9 stories

The Studio Building is a nine-story building in downtown Portland, Oregon. Built in 1927 by the Ellison-White Conservatory of Music, along with the attached Guild Theatre, the building originally had 128 studios for actors and musicians. The exterior displays busts of famous composers. The street level is occupied by the restaurant Pastini, as of 2010.
