= R. W. Dromgold =

Businessman and city councilman

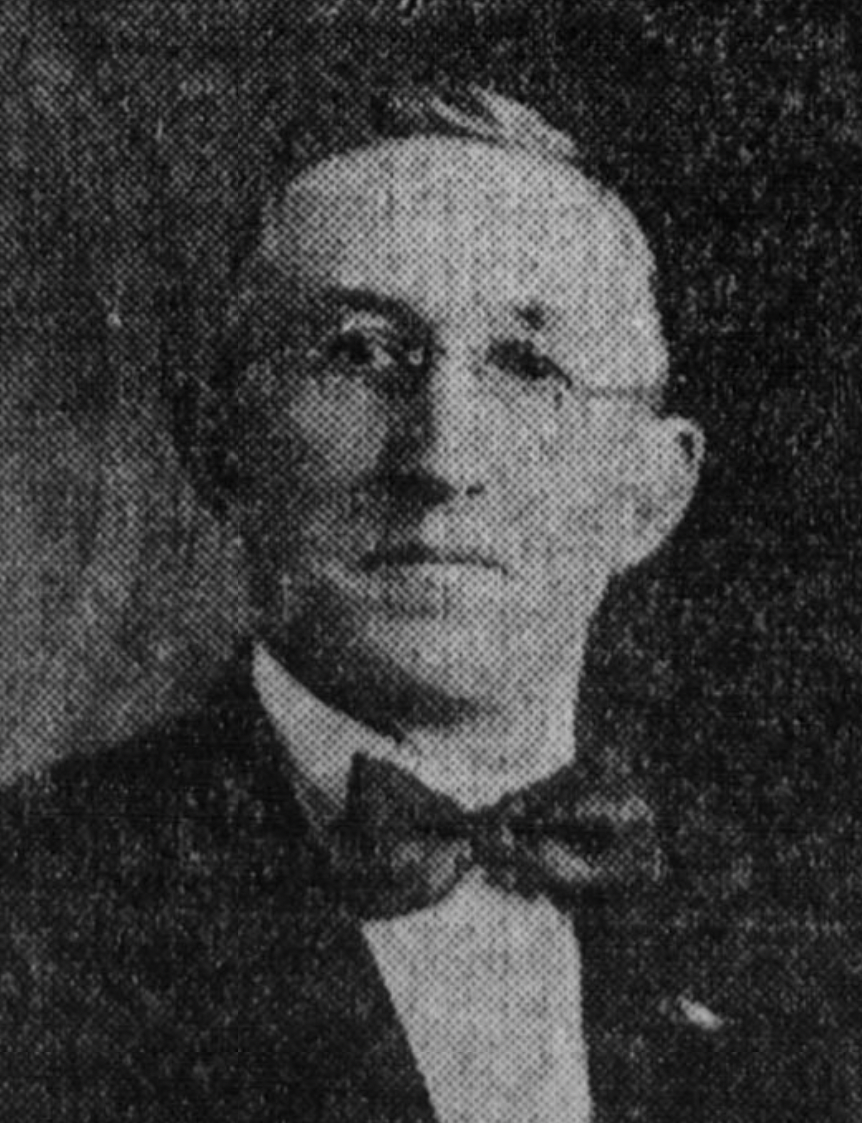
- Dromgold in 1906

Member of the Los Angeles City Council from the 1st ward
- In office December 8, 1906 – December 10, 1909
- Preceded by: Fred L. Ford
- Succeeded by: District eliminated

Personal details
- Born: Reuben Wiger Dromgold c. 1856 Shirleysburg, Pennsylvania, US
- Died: November 7, 1918 Los Angeles, California, US
- Resting place: Evergreen Cemetery, Los Angeles
- Spouse: Nellie M. Squire
- Children: George Dromgold

Reuben Wiger Dromgold (c. 1856 – November 7, 1918), was a Los Angeles businessman who served on the city council there in the early 20th century. His chief accomplishment was securing the erection of the Second Street Bridge across the Los Angeles River, which was inaugurated by President William Howard Taft in 1909.

== Birth and family ==
Reuben Wiger Dromgold was born in "Sharleyburg", Pennsylvania, around 1856 and spent his early years on his mother's farm. He moved to Los Angeles in the 1880s and was married in 1890 to Nellie M. Squire. They had one son, George. The family lived on North Workman Street but moved in 1892 to 447 Temple Street.

== Vocation ==
Dromgold taught school in his home town and then moved to Versailles, Missouri, where he worked with his brother as a wagon-maker for two years. After moving to Los Angeles, he formed a house- and sign-painting business partnership in June 1892 with Paul H. Fitzgerald under the name Star Sign Company.

In November 1899, he was physically assaulted by two other sign painters, Albert M. Imelli and Otto Wieben, on the street in front of Dromgold's business in the Byrne Block; a crowd gathered and separated the men, a policeman was called, the two assailants were arrested and they were fined $15 each in court. It was noted that Dromgold and Imelli had previously been partners "but they separated some time ago, and the feeling between them is not cordial."

== Community work ==
In 1890, Dromgold supported a plan to build a cable car line on Second Street (Angel's Flight) to rise up Bunker Hill, pledging $80 to the project at a mass meeting of the Crown Hills Improvement Society in Ellis College. He was one of the original members of the Los Angeles Chamber of Commerce and of the Merchants and Manufacturers Association.

As president of the East Side Improvement Association, he "fathered" a bridge and viaduct plan for connecting Pasadena and Downey avenues and Buena Vista Street (the present North Broadway). At that time he was living at 127 North Gates Street. It was noted in 1906 that he had "large property interests."

== City Council ==
=== Election ===
Dromgold was a successful candidate for the City Council in the First Ward in 1906, nominated by the Democratic Party and the Non-Partisan organization. He was elected and served a three-year term before a new city charter put an end to the ward election system.

He attempted a comeback in 1915, when he ran for election in a resurrected and refashioned first-past-the-post voting system, in which all candidates ran at large. He finished nineteenth in the primary election, in which eighteen candidates were nominated for the final.

=== Work on the council ===
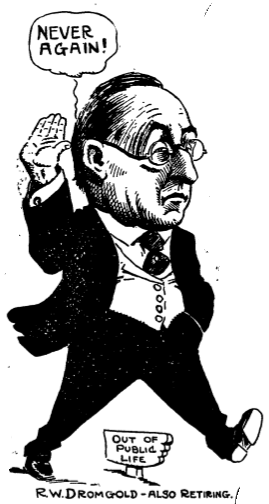
Drawing of Dromgold showing his refusal to run for a second term.

His chief accomplishment was securing the erection of the Second Street Bridge across the Los Angeles River, which was inaugurated by President William Howard Taft in 1909. He was also one of the council members who voted in favor of the Owens River Project to bring water to Los Angeles from East Central California. Other highlights of his tenure:

Dromgold was one of the early proponents of using voting machines in city elections, The city bought 52 of them in 1906 and the county bought 102 the same year, but none were ever used. "A little test will show that the machines will please the people and be a great economy for the public treasury," he said.

The councilman warned that private individuals and companies had filed for deeds with the city engineer for plats of land in the Los Angeles River bed, property that by rights belonged to the city "under the Mexican six-mile-square original grant." He said the gravel rights in the wash were worth "thousands" to the city. The problem came to light when a "teamster" was arrested for taking material from the river bottom on land that was claimed by businessman Cal Forrester.

Forrester began a recall movement against the councilman, but Dromgold did some personal investigation and found, he said, that Forrester's Bishop Street home was built on property that was owned by the city and was never vacated: He slipped a resolution through City Council calling upon the city attorney to investigate and to "dispossess any intruder" if it was found to belong to the city. The city attorney found that the land had been "dedicated many years ago for park purposes, at a time when there was a threat to located a pest-house in the vicinity." The area was at the south end of Elysian Park.

In a similar vein, Dromgold ordered an ordinance prepared that would end the common practice of the city vacating portions of a public street simply because an adjacent property owner wanted to build on it. Adna R. Chaffee, chairman of the Board of Public Works, "agreed that the mere fact that land intended for public use is not now used is no reason why it should be vacated. He also thought the city should be reumunerated in such cases, just as it has to remunerate land when it is condemned."

The council approved an ordinance he introduced to forbid "swinging" electric signs more than thirty inches over the street or sidewalk, and Mayor Arthur C. Harper vetoed it three times on the grounds that business owners wanted to be able to put up larger signs. "My recent trip to San Francisco convinced me that we are making a mistake by not permitting the swinging electric signs here," the mayor said. "At night Fillmore street there is a great white way. There are electric signs in front of almost every place of business."

A community meeting was called by C. H. Randall, editor of the Highland Park Herald, for the purpose of beginning a recall movement against Dromgold, but the stormy meeting of about seventy voters eventually ended with a vote endorsing the councilman's "honesty and integrity."

== Death ==
Dromgold died of heart failure on November 7, 1918, and funeral services were held at Evergreen Cemetery.
