= George Dromgold =

American actor and writer

George C. Dromgold
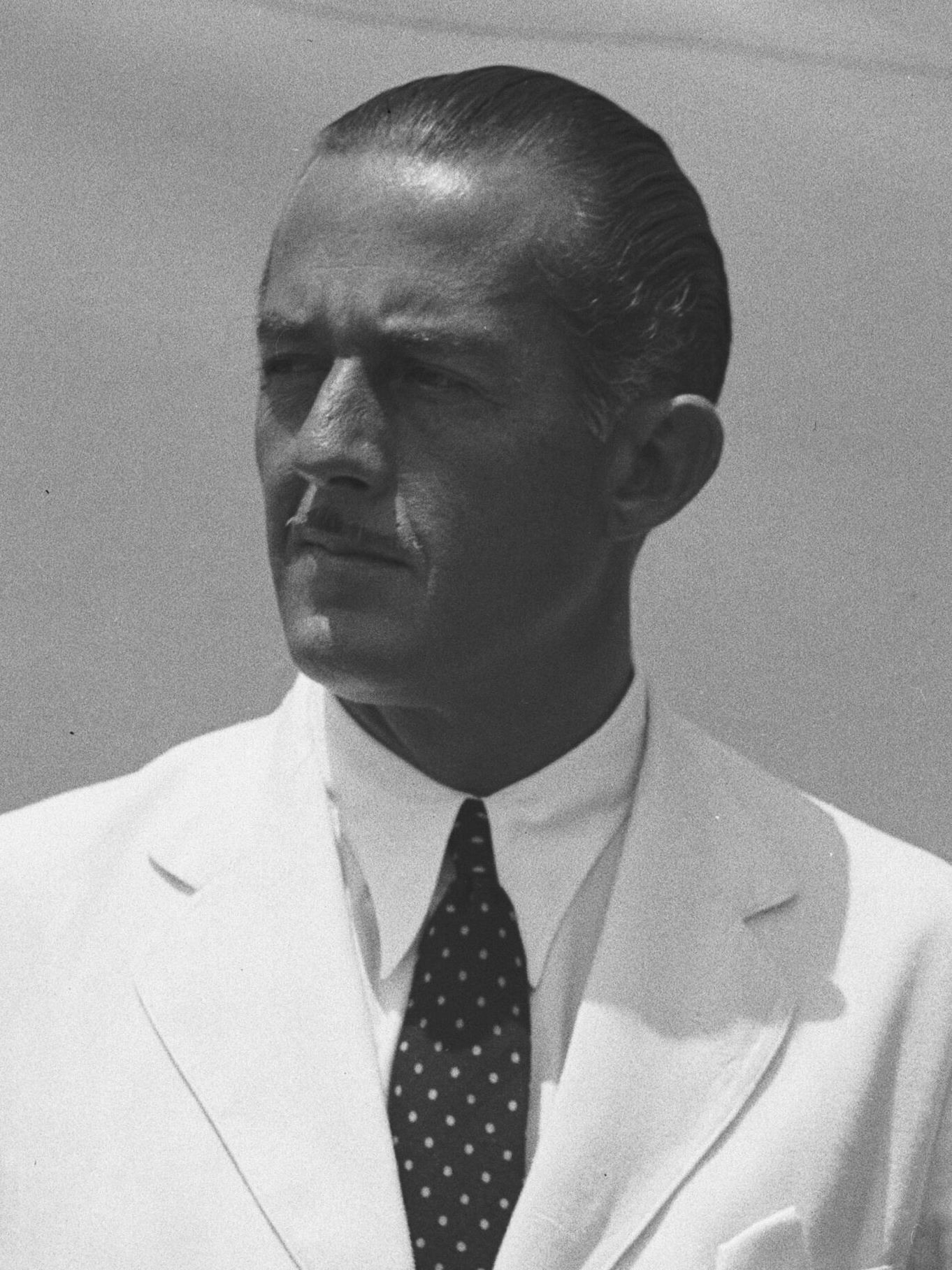
- Dromgold in 1933
- Born: July 14, 1893; Los Angeles
- Died: April 9, 1948 (aged 54); Fort Lauderdale, Florida
- Occupations: actor, writer
- Spouse: Helen S. Dromgold

George C. Dromgold (July 14, 1893 – April 9, 1948) was an actor and writer, who wrote a book about his South Seas exploration.

== Early years ==
George Dromgold was the son of R. W. Dromgold, a Los Angeles businessman, real estate investor, and member of the Los Angeles City Council, and Nellie Squire Dromgold. George Dromgold worked as a salesman, lived for a time in Honolulu, and entered movies in 1914. He received his first screenplay credit in 1927.

== Later career ==
In 1933, Dromgold and James B. Shackelford traveled to the Great Barrier Reef and Papua, spending three months at Fiji. At Suva, they observed and analyzed fire-walking. Dromgold wrote a book, Two Lugs on a Lugger, with photographs by Shackelford, describing their adventures.

== Selected filmography ==
- In Wrong (1919)
- The Web of Chance (1919)
- Go and Get It (1920)
- Through the Back Door (1921)
- Minnie (1922)
- Fools First (1922)
- The Lying Truth (1922)
- Waking Up the Town (1925)
- Polly of the Movies (1927)
- Ragtime (1927)
- Love Over Night (1928)
- Marked Money (1928)
- Celebrity (1928)
- Square Shoulders (1929)
