= Broadway Building (Portland, Oregon) =

Historic building in Portland, Oregon, U.S.

- U.S. National Register of Historic Places
- Portland Historic Landmark
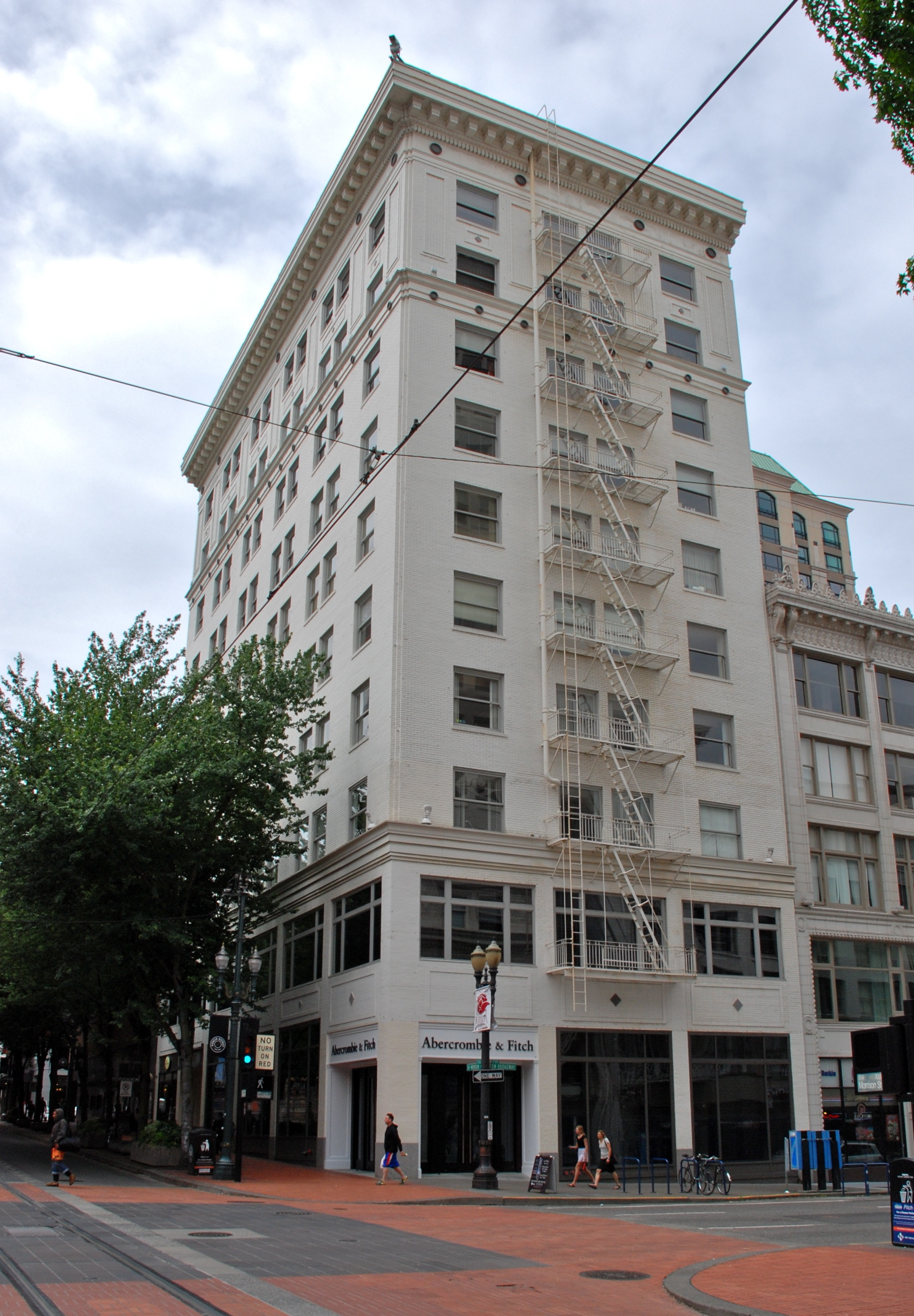
- The Broadway Building in 2014

- Location within Portland, Oregon
- Location: 715 SW Morrison Street; Portland, Oregon
- Coordinates: 45°31′10″N 122°40′47″W
- Built: 1913
- Architect: MacNaughton & Raymond
- Architectural style: Early Commercial
- NRHP reference No.: 96001000
- Added to NRHP: September 12, 1996

The Broadway Building, also known as the Pioneer Park Building, is a building located in downtown Portland, Oregon, that is listed on the National Register of Historic Places.

== See also ==
- National Register of Historic Places listings in Southwest Portland, Oregon
