= Guild Theatre (Portland, Oregon) =

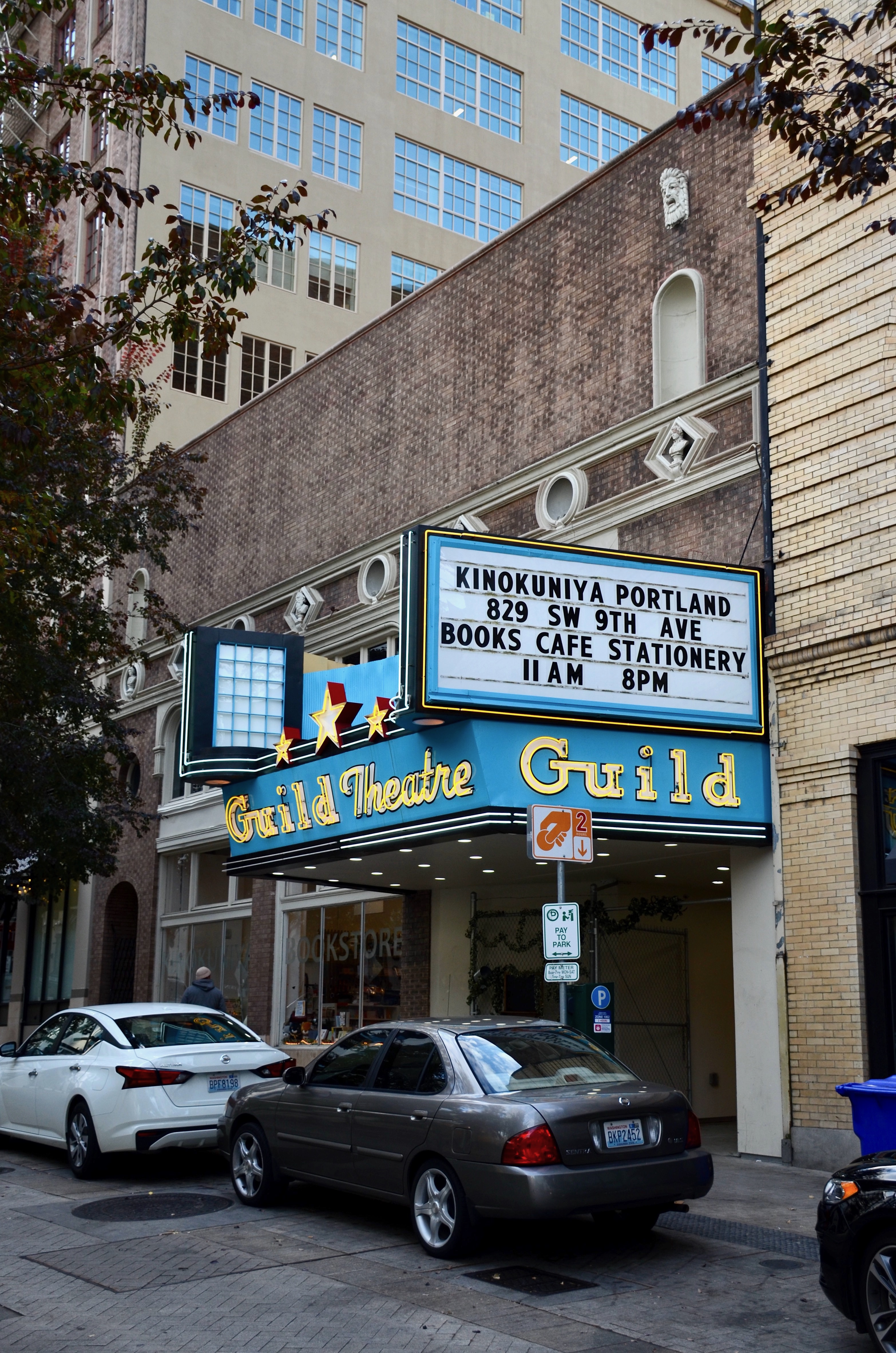
- The former theater in 2019, now a bookshop but with the historic marquee restored
- Interactive map of Guild Theatre
- Former names: Taylor Street Theatre (1927–1947)
- Address: 829 Southwest 9th Avenue
- Location: Portland, Oregon, United States
- Coordinates: 45.519°N 122.682°W
- Owner: TMT Development
- Capacity: 400

Construction
- Opened: 1927
- Renovated: 1956
- Closed: 2006

The Guild Theatre (originally the Taylor Street Theatre) is a historic former theater building in downtown Portland, Oregon, in the United States. The theater was completed and opened in 1927. It closed in 2006 and was converted for retail use in 2018–2019. Since 2019, a Kinokuniya bookstore has occupied the space.

== History ==
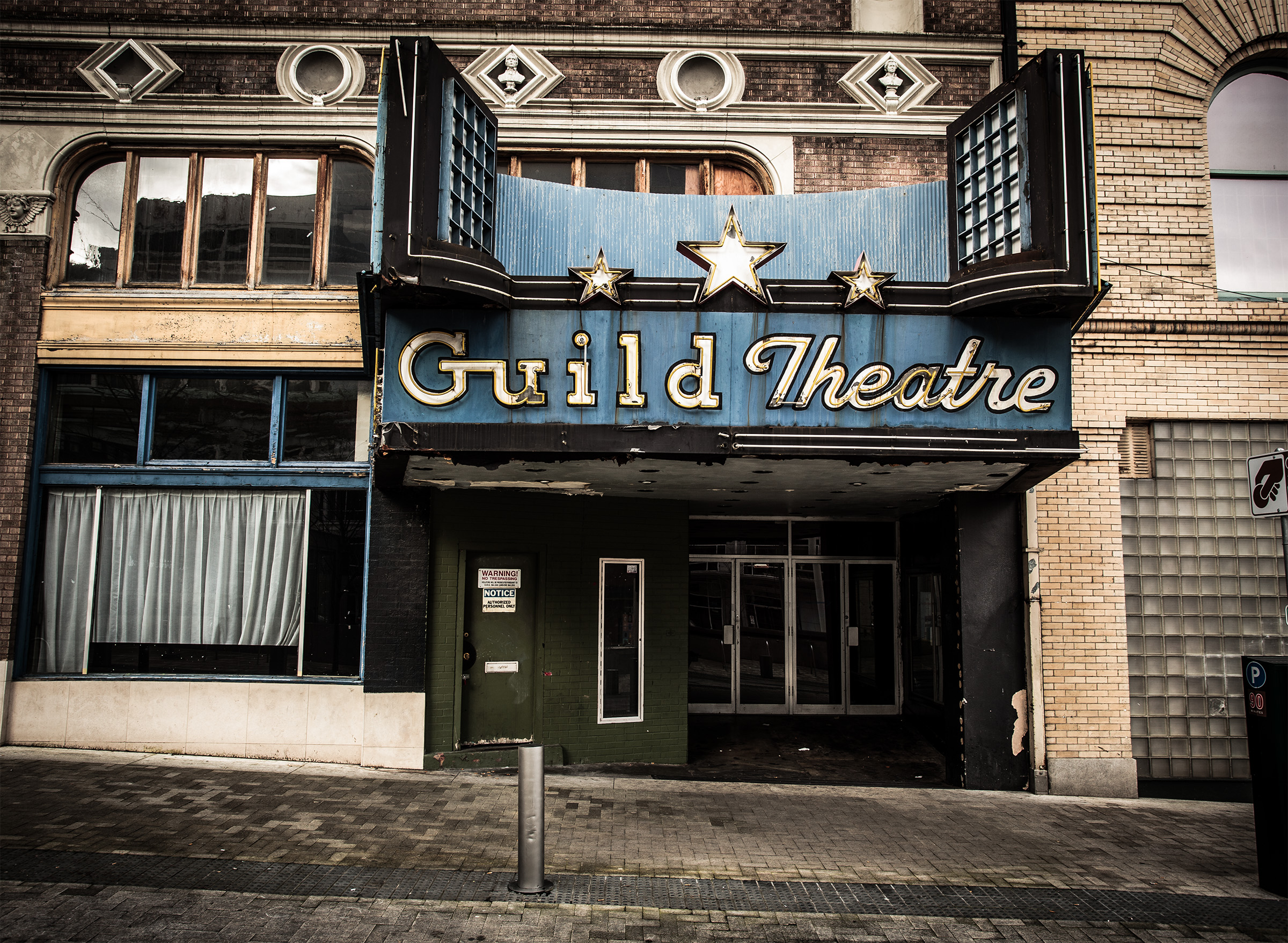
The former theater's main entrance in 2013, seven years after its closure

The Guild was the last remaining single-screen theater in Downtown Portland, completed in 1927. Throughout the 1970s and 1980s, the Guild screened classic films, advertised as "Oregon's finest film classics theater". Later, it changed to showing second-run films. The theater has been closed and out of use since 2006, but a renovation began in 2017, for an unknown purpose. The 5,000-square-foot (460 m^{2}) building was originally called the Taylor Street Theatre until 1947, when J.J. Parker changed the name to the Guild after purchasing the theater. It closed in 2006.

The Guild was the home of the Northwest Film Center and the center's Portland International Film Festival from 1998 to 2006. The center had been allowed to lease the theater from its owner, Tom Moyer, for just $1 a year. A proposal in 2010 to renovate and reopen the theater did not come to fruition.

=== 2017 remodel ===
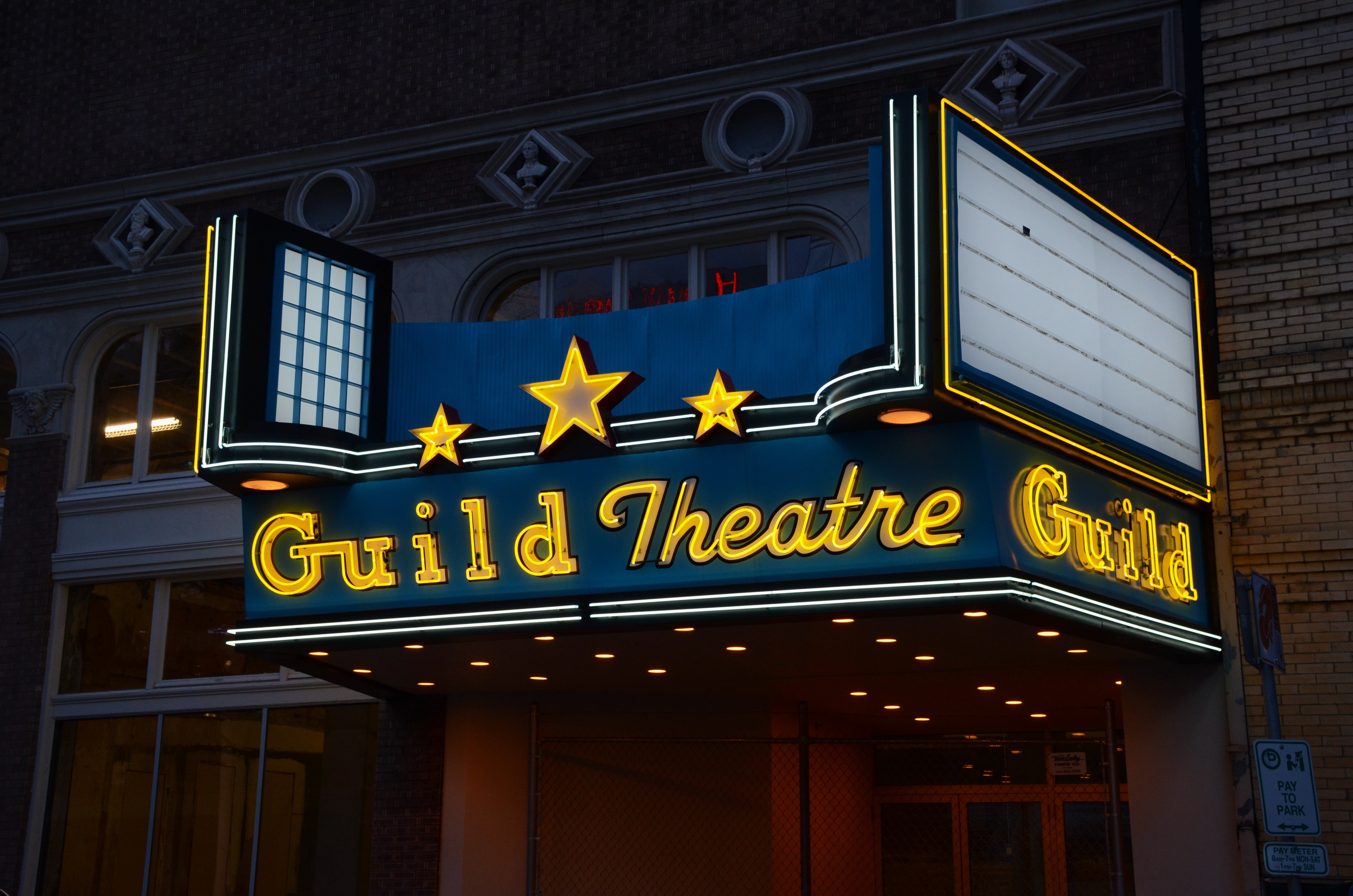
The restored marquee at dusk in 2018

In late 2016, Tom Moyer's company, TMT Development, the property's owner, began work on remodeling the building. TMT also owns the adjacent Studio Building (a nine-story office building), and the work on the theater building is part of that $8 million project to renovate both buildings. In January 2017, the company told the Portland Business Journal that the former theater space is being remodeled for a new tenant whose identity could not yet be revealed, due to a non-disclosure agreement. At that time, TMT was forecasting that its part of the remodeling work would be completed by early spring 2017, and the new tenant would then take over the site, in preparation for its own work on the former theater. Renovation of the marquee took place later in 2017.

In May 2019, the Japanese bookstore chain Books Kinokuniya announced that the former theater would be the site of its new Portland store. The bookstore opened in August 2019. After the remodeling and conversion of the space, the Portland Tribune described the modified interior as "light and airy, to the point of being sparse. The high ceilings are decorated with long strands of fiber, and the upstairs balcony, once the domain of the projectionist is given over to tightly packed rows of Japanese comics and graphic novels."

In 2019, Behind the Museum Café's owner Tomoe Horibuchi confirmed plans to open a second location called Book of Tea Café, within Kinokuniya. The cafe opened on August 21, 2019.
