= List of American films of 1920 =

American films released in 1920

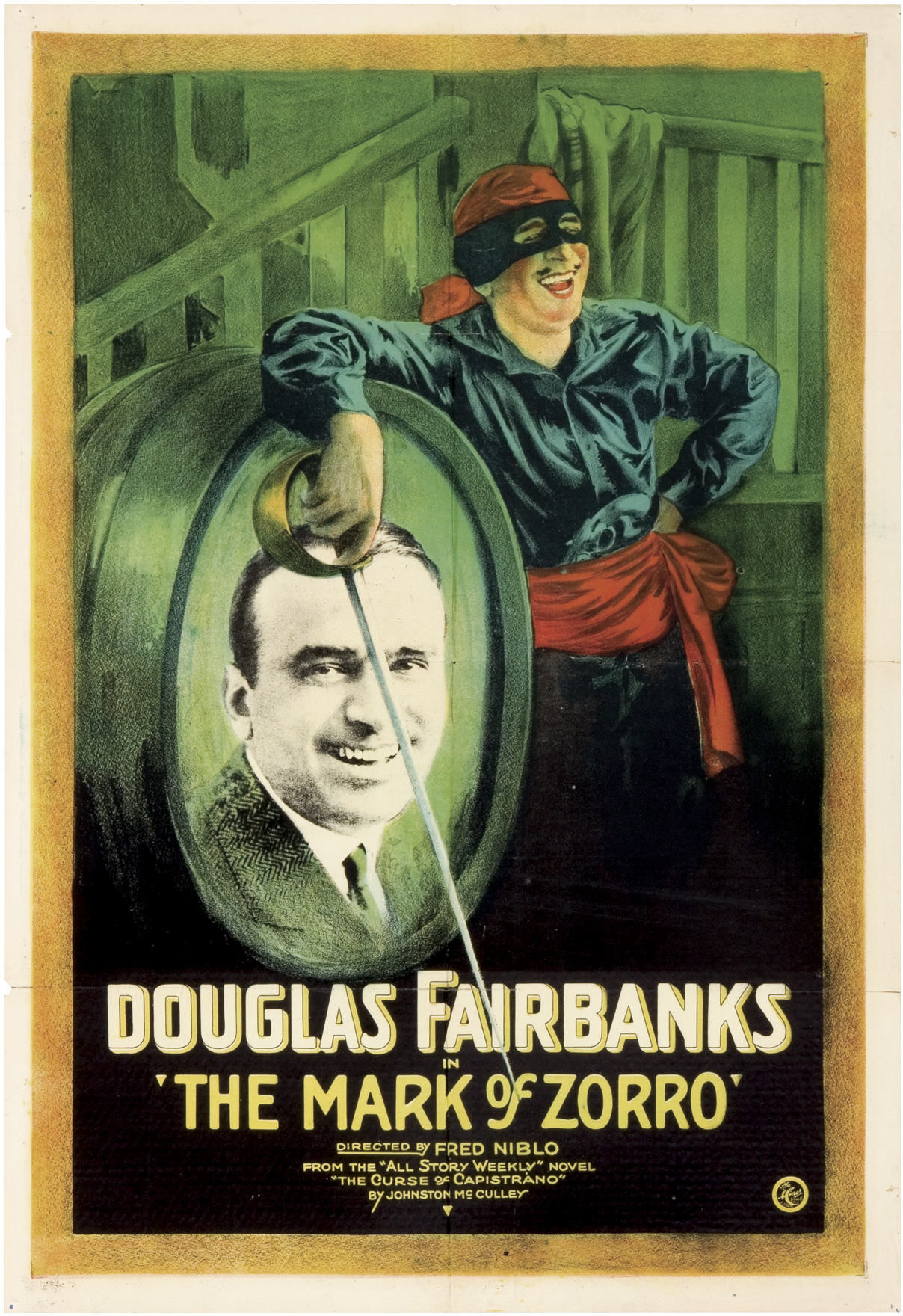
The Mark of Zorro (United Artists) starring Douglas Fairbanks.

In 1920, the U.S. produced more than 630 feature films.

== A ==
Title	Director	Featured Cast	Genre	Note
813	Charles Christie, Scott Sidney	Wedgwood Nowell, Ralph Lewis, Wallace Beery, Laura La Plante	Mystery	FBO
The Adorable Savage	Norman Dawn	Edith Roberts, Jack Perrin	Romance	Universal
The Adventurer	J. Gordon Edwards	William Farnum, Estelle Taylor	Historical	Fox Film
Alarm Clock Andy	Jerome Storm	Charles Ray, George Webb	Comedy	Paramount
Alias Jimmy Valentine	Edmund Mortimer	Bert Lytell, Vola Vale, Eugene Pallette	Crime	Metro
Alias Miss Dodd	Harry L. Franklin	Edith Roberts, Margaret McWade	Comedy	Universal
All of a Sudden Peggy	Walter Edwards	Marguerite Clark, Jack Mulhall	Comedy	Paramount
Always Audacious	James Cruze	Wallace Reid, Margaret Loomis	Romance	Paramount
An Amateur Devil	Maurice S. Campbell	Bryant Washburn, Ann May	Comedy	Paramount
The Amateur Wife	Edward Dillon	Irene Castle, William P. Carleton	Drama	Paramount
April Folly	Robert Z. Leonard	Marion Davies, Conway Tearle	Drama	Paramount
An Arabian Knight	Charles Swickard	Sessue Hayakawa, Jean Acker	Drama	FBO
Are All Men Alike?	Phil Rosen	May Allison, Wallace MacDonald	Comedy-drama	Metro
Away Goes Prudence	John S. Robertson	Billie Burke, Percy Marmont	Comedy	Paramount

== B ==
Title	Director	Featured Cast	Genre	Note
Babs	Edward H. Griffith	Corinne Griffith, George Fawcett	Comedy	Vitagraph
Beautifully Trimmed	Marcel De Sano	Carmel Myers, Irving Cummings	Thriller	Universal
A Beggar in Purple	Edgar Lewis	Lee Shumway, Charles Arling	Drama	Pathe Exchange
The Beggar Prince	William Worthington	Sessue Hayakawa, Josef Swickard	Comedy	FBO
Behold My Wife!	George Melford	Mabel Julienne Scott, Milton Sills, Winter Hall	Drama	Paramount
Below the Surface	Irvin Willat	Hobart Bosworth, Grace Darmond	Drama	Paramount
The Best of Luck	Ray C. Smallwood	Kathryn Adams, Jack Holt, Lila Leslie	Drama	Metro
Beware of the Bride	Howard M. Mitchell	Eileen Percy, Walter McGrail	Comedy	Fox Film
Big Happiness	Colin Campbell	Dustin Farnum, Kathryn Adams	Drama	FBO
Billions	Ray C. Smallwood	Alla Nazimova, Charles Bryant	Comedy	Metro
The Birth of a Soul	Edwin L. Hollywood	Harry T. Morey, Jean Paige	Drama	Vitagraph
Black Is White	Charles Giblyn	Dorothy Dalton, Holmes Herbert	Drama	Paramount
Blackbirds	John Francis Dillon	Justine Johnstone, Charles K. Gerrard	Crime	Paramount
Blackmail	Dallas M. Fitzgerald	Viola Dana, Wyndham Standing	Drama	Metro
Black Shadows	Howard M. Mitchell	Peggy Hyland, Alan Roscoe	Crime	Fox Film
Blind Wives	Charles Brabin	Marc McDermott, Estelle Taylor	Drama	Fox Film
Blind Youth	Edward Sloman	Walter McGrail, Leatrice Joy	Drama	Select
The Blood Barrier	J. Stuart Blackton	Sylvia Breamer, Robert Gordon	Drama	Pathe Exchange
The Blooming Angel	Victor Schertzinger	Madge Kennedy, Pat O'Malley, Margery Wilson	Comedy	Goldwyn
The Blue Moon	George L. Cox	Pell Trenton, Elinor Field	Drama	Pathe Exchange
The Blue Pearl	George Irving	Edith Hallor, Lumsden Hare, Earl Schenck	Mystery	Independent
Blue Streak McCoy	B. Reeves Eason	Harry Carey, Lila Leslie	Western	Universal
Body and Soul	Charles Swickard	Alice Lake, Stuart Holmes	Drama	Metro
Bonnie May	Ida May Park, Joseph De Grasse	Bessie Love, Charles Gordon	Comedy drama	Independent
The Brand of Lopez	Joseph De Grasse	Sessue Hayakawa, Florence Turner	Drama	FBO
The Branded Four	Duke Worne	Ben F. Wilson, Neva Gerber	Action	Select
The Branded Woman	Albert Parker	Norma Talmadge, Percy Marmont, Vincent Serrano	Drama	First National
The Branding Iron	Reginald Barker	Barbara Castleton, James Kirkwood, Russell Simpson	Western	Goldwyn
The Breath of the Gods	Rollin S. Sturgeon	Tsuru Aoki, Arthur Carewe	Drama	Universal
Bright Skies	Henry Kolker	Zasu Pitts, Tom Gallery	Drama	FBO
The Broadway Bubble	George L. Sargent	Corinne Griffith, Joe King	Drama	Vitagraph
A Broadway Cowboy	Joseph Franz	William Desmond, Betty Francisco	Western	Pathe Exchange
Broadway and Home	Alan Crosland	Eugene O'Brien, Elinor Fair	Drama	Selznick
The Broken Gate	Paul Scardon	Bessie Barriscale, Joseph Kilgour	Drama	Pathe Exchange
The Brute Master	Roy Marshall	Hobart Bosworth, Anna Q. Nilsson	Drama	Pathe Exchange
Bullet Proof	Lynn Reynolds	Harry Carey, Fred Gamble	Western	Universal
Burglar Proof	Maurice Campbell	Bryant Washburn, Lois Wilson	Comedy	Paramount
Burning Daylight	Edward Sloman	Mitchell Lewis, Helen Ferguson	Drama	Metro
Burnt Wings	Christy Cabanne	Josephine Hill, Frank Mayo	Drama	Universal
The Butterfly Man	Louis J. Gasnier, Ida May Park	Lew Cody, Louise Lovely, Lila Leslie	Drama	FBO

== C ==
Title	Director	Featured Cast	Genre	Note
Captain Swift	Tom Terriss	Earle Williams, Edward Martindel	Drama	Vitagraph
Chains of Evidence	Dallas M. Fitzgerald	Edmund Breese, Anna Lehr	Mystery	Independent
The Challenge of the Law	Scott R. Dunlap	William Russell, Helen Ferguson	Western	Fox Film
The Cheater	Henry Otto	May Allison, King Baggot	Drama	Metro
A Child for Sale	Ivan Abramson	Gladys Leslie, Creighton Hale	Melodrama	Independent
The Chorus Girl's Romance	William C. Dowlan	Viola Dana, Gareth Hughes	Comedy	Metro
Cinderella's Twin	Dallas M. Fitzgerald	Viola Dana, Wallace MacDonald	Comedy	Metro
The City of Masks	Thomas N. Heffron	Robert Warwick, Lois Wilson, Theodore Kosloff	Comedy drama	Paramount
A City Sparrow	Sam Wood	Ethel Clayton, Walter Hiers	Drama	Paramount
Civilian Clothes	Hugh Ford	Thomas Meighan, Martha Mansfield	Comedy	Paramount
Clothes	Fred Sittenham	Olive Tell, Crauford Kent	Drama	Metro
The Coast of Opportunity	Ernest C. Warde	J. Warren Kerrigan, Herschel Mayall, Fritzi Brunette	Drama	Independent
The Common Sin	Burton King	Rod La Rocque, Nita Naldi	Drama	Independent
Conrad in Quest of His Youth	William C. deMille	Thomas Meighan, Mabel Van Buren	Comedy	Paramount
The Confession	Bertram Bracken	Henry B. Walthall, Francis McDonald	Drama	Independent
The Copperhead	Charles Maigne	Lionel Barrymore, Doris Rankin	Period drama	Paramount
The Corsican Brothers	Colin Campbell	Dustin Farnum, Winifred Kingston	Adventure	Independent
The Cost	Harley Knoles	Violet Heming, Edward Arnold	Drama	Paramount
The Courage of Marge O'Doone	David Smith	Pauline Starke, Niles Welch	Drama	Vitagraph
The County Fair	Maurice Tourneur	Helen Jerome Eddy, David Butler	Drama	Independent
The Cradle of Courage	Lambert Hillyer	William S. Hart, Ann Little, Tom Santschi	Drama	Paramount
Crooked Streets	Paul Powell	Ethel Clayton, Jack Holt	Drama	Paramount
A Cumberland Romance	Charles Maigne	Mary Miles Minter, Monte Blue, John Bowers	Drama	Independent
The Cup of Fury	T. Hayes Hunter	Helene Chadwick, Rockliffe Fellowes	Drama	Goldwyn
Cupid the Cowpuncher	Clarence G. Badger	Will Rogers, Helene Chadwick	Comedy	Goldwyn
Curtain	James Young	Katherine MacDonald, Edwin B. Tilton	Drama	First National
The Cyclone	Clifford Smith	Tom Mix, Colleen Moore	Action	Fox Film
Cynthia of the Minute	Perry N. Vekroff	Leah Baird, Burr McIntosh	Adventure	Independent

== D ==
Title	Director	Featured Cast	Genre	Note
The Dancin' Fool	Sam Wood	Wallace Reid, Bebe Daniels	Comedy	Paramount
Dangerous Business	Roy William Neill	Constance Talmadge, Kenneth Harlan	Comedy	First National
Dangerous Days	Reginald Barker	Lawson Butt, Clarissa Selwynne, Rowland V. Lee	Drama	Goldwyn
The Dangerous Paradise	William P. S. Earle	Louise Huff, Harry Benham	Drama	Selznick
The Dangerous Talent	George L. Cox	Margarita Fischer, Beatrice Van	Drama	Pathe Exchange
Dangerous to Men	William C. Dowlan	Viola Dana, Milton Sills	Comedy	Metro
The Daredevil	Tom Mix	Tom Mix, Eva Novak	Western	Fox Film
A Dark Lantern	John S. Robertson	Alice Brady, Reginald Denny	Drama	Independent
Darling Mine	Laurence Trimble	Olive Thomas, Walter McGrail	Drama	Selznick
The Dark Mirror	Charles Giblyn	Dorothy Dalton, Huntley Gordon	Drama	Paramount
A Daughter of Two Worlds	James Young	Norma Talmadge, William Shea	Drama	First National
The Daughter Pays	Robert Ellis	Elaine Hammerstein, Norman Trevor	Drama	Selznick
The Dead Line	Dell Henderson	George Walsh, Irene Boyle	Action	Fox Film
Dead Men Tell No Tales	Tom Terriss	Catherine Calvert, Percy Marmont, Holmes Herbert	Adventure	Vitagraph
The Deadlier Sex	Robert Thornby	Blanche Sweet, Winter Hall	Comedy	Pathe Exchange
Deadline at Eleven	George Fawcett	Corinne Griffith, Webster Campbell	Drama	Vitagraph
The Deep Purple	Raoul Walsh	Miriam Cooper, Helen Ware	Crime	Independent
Deep Waters	Maurice Tourneur	Barbara Bedford, John Gilbert	Drama	Paramount
Desert Love	Jacques Jaccard	Tom Mix, Francelia Billington, Eva Novak	Western	Fox Film
The Desperate Hero	Wesley Ruggles	Owen Moore, Gloria Hope	Comedy	Selznick
The Devil's Claim	Charles Swickard	Sessue Hayakawa, Colleen Moore, Rhea Mitchell	Drama	FBO
The Devil's Garden	Kenneth Webb	Lionel Barrymore, May McAvoy, Doris Rankin	Drama	First National
The Devil's Pass Key	Erich von Stroheim	Sam de Grasse, Mae Busch	Drama	Universal
The Devil's Riddle	Frank Beal	Gladys Brockwell, William Scott	Drama	Fox Film
The Devil to Pay	Ernest C. Warde	Roy Stewart, Robert McKim, Fritzi Brunette	Mystery	Pathe Exchange
Dice of Destiny	Henry King	H. B. Warner, Lillian Rich	Crime	Pathe Exchange
Dinty	Marshall Neilan	Wesley Barry, Noah Beery, Colleen Moore	Adventure comedy	First National
The Discarded Woman	Burton L. King	Grace Darling, Rod La Rocque	Drama	Independent
Dollar for Dollar	Frank Keenan	Kathleen Kirkham, Harry von Meter	Drama	Pathe Exchange
Dollars and Sense	Harry Beaumont	Madge Kennedy, Kenneth Harlan	Drama	Goldwyn
Dollars and the Woman	George Terwilliger	Alice Joyce, Crauford Kent	Drama	Vitagraph
Don't Ever Marry	Marshall Neilan	Matt Moore, Marjorie Daw	Comedy	First National
Double Speed	Sam Wood	Wallace Reid, Wanda Hawley	Comedy	Paramount
A Double-Dyed Deceiver	Alfred E. Green	Jack Pickford, Marie Dunn	Crime drama	Goldwyn
Down Home	Irvin Willat	Leatrice Joy, James O. Barrows	Drama	Independent
Down on the Farm	Erle C. Kenton	Louise Fazenda, Harry Gribbon	Comedy	United Artists
Dr. Jekyll and Mr. Hyde	John S. Robertson	John Barrymore	Horror	Paramount
Drag Harlan	J. Gordon Edwards	William Farnum, Jackie Saunders	Western	Fox Film
The Dream Cheater	Ernest C. Warde	J. Warren Kerrigan, Wedgwood Nowell	Horror	Independent
Duds	Thomas R. Mills	Tom Moore, Naomi Childers, Christine Mayo	Mystery	Goldwyn
The Dwelling Place of Light	Jack Conway	Claire Adams, Nigel De Brulier	Drama	Pathe Exchange

== E ==
Title	Director	Featured Cast	Genre	Note
Earthbound	T. Hayes Hunter	Wyndham Standing, Mahlon Hamilton, Naomi Childers	Drama	Goldwyn
Easy to Get	Walter Edwards	Marguerite Clark, Rod La Rocque	Comedy	Paramount
The Empire of Diamonds	Léonce Perret	Robert Elliott, Lucy Fox	Crime	Pathe Exchange
The Eternal Mother	Will S. Davis	Florence Reed, Lionel Atwill, Gareth Hughes	Drama	Independent
Even as Eve	B. A. Rolfe	Sally Crute, Marc McDermott	Comedy	First National
Everybody's Sweetheart	Laurence Trimble	Olive Thomas, William Collier Jr.	Comedy drama	Selznick
Everything But the Truth	Eddie Lyons	Eddie Lyons, Lee Moran, Anne Cornwall	Comedy	Universal
Excuse My Dust	Sam Wood	Wallace Reid, Ann Little	Comedy	Paramount
Eyes of the Heart	Paul Powell	Mary Miles Minter, Edmund Burns, Lucien Littlefield	Crime	Independent

== F ==
Title	Director	Featured Cast	Genre	Note
The Face at Your Window	Richard Stanton	Gina Relly, Earl Metcalfe	Drama	Fox Film
Faith	Howard M. Mitchell	Peggy Hyland, Winter Hall	Drama	Fox Film
The False Road	Fred Niblo	Enid Bennett, Lloyd Hughes	Drama	Paramount
The Family Honor	King Vidor	Florence Vidor, Roscoe Karns	Drama	First National
The Fatal Hour	George Terwilliger	Wilfred Lytell, Lionel Pape	Drama	Metro
The Fear Market	Kenneth Webb	Alice Brady, Frank Losee	Drama	Independent
Felix O'Day	Robert Thornby	H. B. Warner, Marguerite Snow, Lillian Rich	Drama	Pathe Exchange
The Fighting Chance	Charles Maigne	Anna Q. Nilsson, Conrad Nagel	Drama	Paramount
The Fighting Shepherdess	Edward José, Millard Webb	Anita Stewart, Wallace MacDonald	Romance	First National
The Figurehead	Robert Ellis	Eugene O'Brien, Anna Q. Nilsson, Ora Carew	Drama	Selznick
Firebrand Trevison	Thomas N. Heffron	Buck Jones, Winifred Westover	Western	Fox Film
Fixed by George	Eddie Lyons	Lee Moran, Eddie Lyons	Comedy	Universal
The Flame of Hellgate	George E. Middleton	Beatriz Michelena, Albert Morrison	Western	Robertson-Cole
Flame of Youth	Howard M. Mitchell	Shirley Mason, Raymond McKee, Philo McCullough	Drama	Fox Film
Flames of the Flesh	Edward LeSaint	Gladys Brockwell, William Scott	Drama	Fox Film
The Flaming Clue	Edwin L. Hollywood	Harry T. Morey, Lucy Fox	Crime	Vitagraph
The Flapper	Alan Crosland	Olive Thomas, Warren Cook	Comedy	Selznick
Flying Pat	F. Richard Jones	Dorothy Gish, James Rennie	Comedy	Paramount
Food for Scandal	James Cruze	Wanda Hawley, Harrison Ford	Comedy	Independent
A Fool and His Money	Robert Ellis	Eugene O'Brien, Rubye De Remer	Drama	Selznick
Footlights and Shadows	John W. Noble	Olive Thomas, Ivo Dawson	Drama	Selznick
For Love or Money	Burton L. King	Virginia Lee, Harry Benham	Drama	Independent
For the Soul of Rafael	Harry Garson	Clara Kimball Young, Bertram Grassby	Drama	Independent
The Forbidden Thing	Allan Dwan	James Kirkwood Sr., Helen Jerome Eddy	Drama	Associated Producers
Forbidden Trails	Scott R. Dunlap	Buck Jones, Winifred Westover	Western	Fox Film
The Forbidden Valley	J. Stuart Blackton	May McAvoy, Bruce Gordon	Drama	Pathe Exchange
The Forbidden Woman	Harry Garson	Clara Kimball Young, Conway Tearle	Drama	FBO
The Forged Bride	Douglas Gerrard	Mary MacLaren, J. Barney Sherry	Crime	Universal
The Fortune Hunter	Tom Terriss	Earle Williams, Jean Paige	Comedy	Vitagraph
The Fortune Teller	Albert Capellani	Marjorie Rambeau, Frederick Burton, Raymond McKee	Drama	FBO
45 Minutes from Broadway	Joseph De Grasse	Charles Ray, Dorothy Devore	Comedy	First National
The Fourteenth Man	Joseph Henabery	Robert Warwick, Bebe Daniels	Comedy	Paramount
The Frisky Mrs. Johnson	Edward Dillon	Billie Burke, Ward Crane, Lumsden Hare	Comedy	Paramount
From Now On	Raoul Walsh	George Walsh, James Marcus	Crime	Fox Film
A Full House	James Cruze	Bryant Washburn, Lois Wilson	Crime	Paramount
The Furnace	William Desmond Taylor	Agnes Ayres, Jerome Patrick	Drama	Independent

== G ==
Title	Director	Featured Cast	Genre	Note
The Gamesters	George L. Cox	Margarita Fischer, Hayward Mack, Lee Shumway	Drama	Pathe Exchange
The Garter Girl	Edward H. Griffith	Corinne Griffith, Sally Crute	Drama	Vitagraph
The Gauntlet	Edwin L. Hollywood	Harry T. Morey, Frank Hagney	Drama	Vitagraph
The Gift Supreme	Ollie L. Sellers	Bernard Durning, Seena Owen, Tully Marshall	Drama	Independent
The Gilded Dream	Rollin S. Sturgeon	Carmel Myers, Tom Chatterton	Drama	Universal
The Girl in Number 29	John Ford	Frank Mayo, Elinor Fair	Drama	Universal
The Girl in the Rain	Rollin S. Sturgeon	Anne Cornwall, Lloyd Bacon	Mystery	Universal
The Girl in the Web	Robert Thornby	Blanche Sweet, Nigel Barrie	Mystery	Pathe Exchange
The Girl of My Heart	Edward LeSaint	Shirley Mason, Raymond McKee	Adventure	Fox Film
Go and Get It	Marshall Neilan	Pat O'Malley, Wesley Barry, Agnes Ayres	Comedy mystery	First National
Godless Men	Reginald Barker	Russell Simpson, Helene Chadwick, John Bowers	Drama	Goldwyn
Going Some	Harry Beaumont	Cullen Landis, Helen Ferguson	Comedy	Goldwyn
The Golden Trail	Lewis H. Moomaw	Jane Novak, Jean Hersholt	Drama	Independent
Good References	Roy William Neill	Constance Talmadge, Vincent Coleman	Comedy	First National
The Great Accident	Harry Beaumont	Tom Moore, Jane Novak	Drama	Goldwyn
The Great Lover	Frank Lloyd	John St. Polis, Claire Adams	Drama	Goldwyn
The Great Redeemer	Clarence Brown	House Peters, Marjorie Daw	Western	Metro
The Great Shadow	Harley Knoles	Tyrone Power Sr., Donald Hall	Drama	Selznick
Greater Than Fame	Alan Crosland	Elaine Hammerstein, Walter McGrail	Drama	Selznick
The Greatest Love	Henry Kolker	Vera Gordon, Bertram Marburgh	Drama	Selznick
The Green Flame	Ernest C. Warde	J. Warren Kerrigan, Fritzi Brunette	Crime	Pathe Exchange
Guilty of Love	Harley Knoles	Dorothy Dalton, Julia Hurley	Drama	Paramount

== H ==
Title	Director	Featured Cast	Genre	Note
Hairpins	Fred Niblo	Enid Bennett, Matt Moore, William Conklin	Drama	Paramount
Half a Chance	Robert Thornby	Mahlon Hamilton, Lillian Rich	Drama	Pathe Exchange
Half an Hour	Harley Knoles	Dorothy Dalton, Charles Richman	Drama	Paramount
The Harvest Moon	J. Searle Dawley	Doris Kenyon, Wilfred Lytell	Drama	Pathe Exchange
Headin' Home	Lawrence C. Windom	Babe Ruth, Margaret Seddon	Sports	Independent
The Heart of a Child	Ray C. Smallwood	Alla Nazimova, Charles Bryant	Drama	Metro
Heart of Twenty	Henry Kolker	Zasu Pitts, Jack Pratt	Comedy	FBO
Heart Strings	J. Gordon Edwards	William Farnum, Paul Cazeneuve	Drama	Fox Film
Hearts Are Trumps	Rex Ingram	Winter Hall, Frank Brownlee, Alice Terry	Drama	Metro
Held by the Enemy	Donald Crisp	Agnes Ayres, Lewis Stone, Wanda Hawley	War drama	Paramount
Held in Trust	John Ince	May Allison, Darrell Foss	Romance	Metro
Heliotrope	George D. Baker	Wilfred Lytell, Julia Swayne Gordon	Drama	Paramount
The Hell Ship	Scott R. Dunlap	Madlaine Traverse, Alan Roscoe	Drama	Fox Film
Help Wanted - Male	Henry King	Blanche Sweet, Frank Leigh	Comedy	Pathe Exchange
Help Yourself	Hugo Ballin	Madge Kennedy, Joseph Striker	Comedy	Goldwyn
Her Beloved Villain	Sam Wood	Wanda Hawley, Tully Marshall	Comedy	Independent
Her Elephant Man	Scott R. Dunlap	Shirley Mason, Alan Roscoe	Drama	Fox Film
Her First Elopement	Sam Wood	Wanda Hawley, Jerome Patrick	Drama	Independent
Her Five-Foot Highness	Harry L. Franklin	Edith Roberts, Ogden Crane	Drama	Universal
Her Honor the Mayor	Paul Cazeneuve	Eileen Percy, Ramsey Wallace	Drama	Fox Film
Her Husband's Friend	Fred Niblo	Enid Bennett, Rowland V. Lee	Drama	Paramount
Her Unwilling Husband	Paul Scardon	Blanche Sweet, Alan Roscoe	Comedy	Pathe Exchange
High Speed	Charles Miller	Edward Earle, Gladys Hulette	Drama	Independent
His House in Order	Hugh Ford	Elsie Ferguson, Holmes Herbert, Vernon Steele	Drama	Paramount
His Own Law	J. Parker Read Jr.	Hobart Bosworth, Rowland V. Lee	Drama	Goldwyn
His Pajama Girl	Donald Edwards	Billie Rhodes, Harry L. Rattenberry	Comedy	Independent
His Wife's Money	Ralph Ince	Eugene O'Brien, Zena Keefe	Drama	Selznick
Hitchin' Posts	John Ford	Frank Mayo, Beatrice Burnham	Drama	Universal
Homer Comes Home	Jerome Storm	Charles Ray, Priscilla Bonner	Comedy	Paramount
Homespun Folks	John Griffith Wray	Lloyd Hughes, Gladys George	Drama	Associated Producers
Honest Hutch	Clarence G. Badger	Will Rogers, Mary Alden	Drama	Goldwyn
The Honey Bee	Rupert Julian	Marguerita Sylva, Nigel Barrie	Drama	Pathe Exchange
Honor Bound	Jacques Jaccard	Frank Mayo, Edward Coxen	Drama	Universal
The Hope	Herbert Blache	Jack Mulhall, Marguerite De La Motte	Comedy	Metro
The House of the Tolling Bell	J. Stuart Blackton	May McAvoy, Eulalie Jensen	Mystery	Pathe Exchange
The House of Toys	George L. Cox	Seena Owen, Pell Trenton, Helen Jerome Eddy	Drama	Pathe Exchange
The House of Whispers	Ernest C. Warde	J. Warren Kerrigan, Fritzi Brunette	Mystery	Pathe Exchange
Huckleberry Finn	William Desmond Taylor	Lewis Sargent, Wallace Beery	Adventure	Paramount
Human Collateral	Lawrence C. Windom	Corinne Griffith, Webster Campbell	Drama	Vitagraph
Human Stuff	B. Reeves Eason	Harry Carey, Charles Le Moyne	Western	Universal
Humoresque	Frank Borzage	Gaston Glass, Vera Gordon, Alma Rubens	Drama	Paramount
The Husband Hunter	Howard M. Mitchell	Eileen Percy, Emory Johnson	Comedy	Fox Film

== I ==
Title	Director	Featured Cast	Genre	Note
The Idol Dancer	D. W. Griffith	Richard Barthelmess, Clarine Seymour, Creighton Hale	Drama	First National
Idols of Clay	George Fitzmaurice	Mae Murray, David Powell	Drama	Paramount
If I Were King	J. Gordon Edwards	William Farnum, Betty Ross Clarke	Drama	Fox Film
'If Only' Jim	Jacques Jaccard	Harry Carey, Carol Holloway, Ruth Royce	Western	Universal
In Folly's Trail	Rollin S. Sturgeon	Carmel Myers, Thomas Holding	Drama	Universal
In Search of a Sinner	David Kirkland	Constance Talmadge, Rockliffe Fellowes	Comedy	First National
In the Heart of a Fool	Allan Dwan	James Kirkwood, Anna Q. Nilsson	Drama	First National
In Walked Mary	George Archainbaud	June Caprice, Thomas Carrigan	Drama	Pathe Exchange
The Inferior Sex	Joseph Henabery	Mildred Harris, Milton Sills, Mary Alden	Drama	First National
The Inner Voice	Roy William Neill	E. K. Lincoln, Agnes Ayres	Drama	Independent
The Invisible Divorce	Thomas R. Mills	Walter McGrail, Leatrice Joy	Drama	Select
The Iron Heart	Denison Clift	Madlaine Traverse, Edwin B. Tilton	Drama	Fox Film
The Iron Rider	Scott R. Dunlap	William Russell, Vola Vale	Western	Fox Film
Isobel or The Trail's End	Edwin Carewe	House Peters, Jane Novak	Adventure	Independent
It's a Great Life	E. Mason Hopper	Cullen Landis, Molly Malone, Clara Horton	Comedy	Goldwyn

== J ==
Title	Director	Featured Cast	Genre	Note
The Jack-Knife Man	King Vidor	F. A. Turner, Harry Todd	Drama	First National
Jack Straw	William C. deMille	Robert Warwick, Carroll McComas	Comedy	Paramount
The Jailbird	Lloyd Ingraham	Douglas MacLean, Doris May	Comedy	Paramount
Jenny Be Good	William Desmond Taylor	Mary Miles Minter, Jay Belasco, Margaret Shelby	Drama	Independent
Jes' Call Me Jim	Clarence G. Badger	Will Rogers, Irene Rich, Lionel Belmore	Drama	Goldwyn
The Joyous Trouble-Makers	J. Gordon Edwards	William Farnum, Louise Lovely	Adventure	Fox Film
Judy of Rogue's Harbor	William Desmond Taylor	Mary Miles Minter, Charles Meredith	Drama	Independent
Just a Wife	Howard C. Hickman	Roy Stewart, Leatrice Joy	Drama	Select
Just Out of College	Alfred E. Green	Jack Pickford, Molly Malone	Comedy	Goldwyn
Just Pals	John Ford	Buck Jones, Helen Ferguson	Western	Fox Film

== K ==
Title	Director	Featured Cast	Genre	Note
The Kentucky Colonel	William A. Seiter	Joseph J. Dowling, Frederick Vroom	Drama	Pathe Exchange
Kismet	Louis J. Gasnier	Otis Skinner, Rosemary Theby, Elinor Fair	Drama	FBO

== L ==
Title	Director	Featured Cast	Genre	Note
The Ladder of Lies	Tom Forman	Ethel Clayton, Jean Acker	Drama	Paramount
A Lady in Love	Walter Edwards	Ethel Clayton, Boyd Irwin	Drama	Paramount
Lady Rose's Daughter	Hugh Ford	Elsie Ferguson, David Powell	Drama	Paramount
Lahoma	Edgar Lewis	Peaches Jackson, Wade Boteler, Jack Perrin	Western	Pathe Exchange
The Land of Jazz	Jules Furthman	Eileen Percy, Ruth Stonehouse, Herbert Heyes	Comedy	Fox Film
The Last of the Mohicans	Clarence Brown, Maurice Tourneur	Wallace Beery	Adventure	Associated Producers
The Last Straw	Denison Clift	Buck Jones, Vivian Rich	Western	Fox Film
Leave It to Me	Emmett J. Flynn	William Russell, Eileen Percy	Comedy	Fox Film
The Leopard Woman	Wesley Ruggles	Louise Glaum, House Peters	Adventure	Associated Producers
Let's Be Fashionable	Lloyd Ingraham	Douglas MacLean, Doris May	Comedy	Paramount
Li Ting Lang	Charles Swickard	Sessue Hayakawa, Allan Forrest	Drama	FBO
Life	Travers Vale	Nita Naldi, Jack Mower	Drama	Paramount
Life of the Party	Joseph Henabery	Roscoe Arbuckle, Winifred Greenwood	Comedy	Paramount
Life's Twist	Christy Cabanne	Bessie Barriscale, Walter McGrail	Drama	FBO
Lifting Shadows	Léonce Perret	Emmy Wehlen, Stuart Holmes, Wyndham Standing	Drama	Pathe Exchange
A Light Woman	George L. Cox	Helen Jerome Eddy, Hallam Cooley, Claire Du Brey	Drama	Pathe Exchange
The Little 'Fraid Lady	John G. Adolfi	Mae Marsh, Tully Marshall	Drama	FBO
The Little Grey Mouse	James P. Hogan	Louise Lovely, Sam De Grasse, Rosemary Theby	Drama	Fox Film
Little Miss Rebellion	George Fawcett	Dorothy Gish, Ralph Graves	Drama	Paramount
The Little Shepherd of Kingdom Come	Wallace Worsley	Jack Pickford, Clara Horton, Pauline Starke	Drama	Goldwyn
The Little Wanderer	Howard M. Mitchell	Shirley Mason, Raymond McKee	Drama	Fox Film
Live Sparks	Ernest C. Warde	J. Warren Kerrigan, Fritzi Brunette	Comedy	Pathe Exchange
Locked Lips	William C. Dowlan	Tsuru Aoki, Yutaka Abe	Drama	Universal
Love	Wesley Ruggles	Louise Glaum, James Kirkwood Sr.	Romance	Associated Producers
The Love Expert	David Kirkland	Constance Talmadge, John Halliday, Natalie Talmadge	Comedy	First National
The Love Flower	D. W. Griffith	Carol Dempster, Richard Barthelmess, George MacQuarrie	Drama	United Artists
Love's Harvest	Howard M. Mitchell	Shirley Mason, Raymond McKee	Drama	Fox Film
Love, Honor and Behave	F. Richard Jones, Erle C. Kenton	Ford Sterling, Charlie Murray	Comedy	First National
Love, Honor and Obey	Leander de Cordova	Wilda Bennett, Claire Whitney	Drama	Metro
Love Madness	Joseph Henabery	Louise Glaum, Matt Moore, Noah Beery	Crime	Pathe Exchange
The Luck of Geraldine Laird	Edward Sloman	Bessie Barriscale, Niles Welch	Drama	FBO
The Luck of the Irish	Allan Dwan	James Kirkwood, Anna Q. Nilsson, Harry Northrup	Drama	Associated Producers

== M ==
Title	Director	Featured Cast	Genre	Note
Madame Peacock	Ray C. Smallwood	Alla Nazimova, John Steppling	Drama	Metro
Madame X	Frank Lloyd	Pauline Frederick	Drama	Goldwyn
Madonnas and Men	B. A. Rolfe	Anders Randolf, Edmund Lowe, Gustav von Seyffertitz	Drama	Independent
Man and His Woman	J. Stuart Blackton	Herbert Rawlinson, Eulalie Jensen, May McAvoy	Drama	Pathe Exchange
A Man from Nowhere	Francis Ford	Jack Hoxie, Frederick Moore	Western	Independent
The Man Who Dared	Emmett J. Flynn	William Russell, Eileen Percy	Drama	Fox Film
The Man Who Had Everything	Alfred E. Green	Jack Pickford, Lionel Belmore	Drama	Goldwyn
The Man Who Lost Himself	Clarence G. Badger	William Faversham, Hedda Hopper	Comedy drama	Selznick
A Manhattan Knight	George Beranger	George Walsh, Warren Cook	Mystery	Fox Film
Man's Plaything	Charles Horan	Montagu Love, Grace Davison, Stuart Holmes	Drama	Independent
The Mark of Zorro	Fred Niblo	Douglas Fairbanks, Marguerite De La Motte	Swashbuckler	United Artists
Marooned Hearts	George Archainbaud	Conway Tearle, Zena Keefe	Drama	Selznick
The Marriage Pit	Frederick A. Thomson	Frank Mayo, Lillian Tucker	Drama	Universal
Married Life	Erle C. Kenton	Ben Turpin, Phyllis Haver, James Finlayson	Comedy	First National
Mary Ellen Comes to Town	Elmer Clifton	Dorothy Gish, Kate Bruce, Ralph Graves	Comedy	Paramount
Mary's Ankle	Lloyd Ingraham	Douglas MacLean, Doris May	Comedy	Paramount
The Master Mind	Kenneth Webb	Lionel Barrymore, Bradley Barker	Crime	First National
A Master Stroke	Chester Bennett	Earle Williams, Vola Vale	Comedy	Vitagraph
Merely Mary Ann	Edward LeSaint	Shirley Mason, Casson Ferguson	Comedy	Fox Film
Mid-Channel	Harry Garson	Clara Kimball Young, J. Frank Glendon	Drama	Independent
The Midlanders	Joseph De Grasse, Ida May Park	Bessie Love, Sydney Deane	Drama	Independent
The Midnight Bride	William J. Humphrey	Gladys Leslie, Virginia Valli	Comedy	Vitagraph
Milestones	Paul Scardon	Lewis Stone, Alice Hollister	Drama	Goldwyn
The Miracle of Money	Hobart Henley	Margaret Seddon, Bess Gearhart Morrison	Drama	Pathe Exchange
The Misfit Wife	Edmund Mortimer	Alice Lake, Forrest Stanley	Drama	Metro
The Misleading Lady	George Irving	Bert Lytell, Lucy Cotton	Comedy	Metro
Miss Hobbs	Donald Crisp	Wanda Hawley, Harrison Ford, Helen Jerome Eddy	Comedy	Independent
A Modern Salome	Leonce Perret	Hope Hampton, Percy Standing	Drama	Metro
Molly and I	Howard M. Mitchell	Shirley Mason, Alan Roscoe	Drama	Fox Film
The Mollycoddle	Victor Fleming	Douglas Fairbanks, Wallace Beery, Ruth Renick	Adventure	United Artists
The Money Changers	Jack Conway	Robert McKim, Claire Adams	Drama	Pathe Exchange
Moon Madness	Colin Campbell	Edith Storey, Sam De Grasse, Josef Swickard	Drama	FBO
The Mother of His Children	Edward LeSaint	Gladys Brockwell, William Scott	Drama	Fox Film
Mrs. Temple's Telegram	James Cruze	Bryant Washburn, Wanda Hawley, Carmen Phillips	Comedy	Paramount
The Mutiny of the Elsinore	Edward Sloman	Mitchell Lewis, Helen Ferguson	Action	Metro
My Husband's Other Wife	J. Stuart Blackton	Sylvia Breamer, May McAvoy	Drama	Pathé Exchange
My Lady's Garter	Maurice Tourneur	Wyndham Standing, Sylvia Breamer	Mystery	Paramount

== N ==
Title	Director	Featured Cast	Genre	Note
Neighbors	Edward F. Cline, Buster Keaton	Buster Keaton, Virginia Fox	Comedy	
The New York Idea	Herbert Blache	Alice Brady, Lowell Sherman, Hedda Hopper	Comedy	Independent
Nineteen and Phyllis	Joseph De Grasse	Charles Ray, Clara Horton	Comedy	First National
Nomads of the North	David Hartford	Betty Blythe, Lon Chaney, Lewis Stone	Crime drama	First National
The North Wind's Malice	Paul Bern	Tom Santschi, Joe King	Drama	Goldwyn
Nothing But Lies	Lawrence C. Windom	Taylor Holmes, Justine Johnstone	Comedy	Metro
Nothing But the Truth	David Kirkland	Taylor Holmes, Poppy Wyndham	Comedy	Metro
Notorious Miss Lisle	James Young	Katherine MacDonald, Nigel Barrie	Drama	First National
The Notorious Mrs. Sands	Christy Cabanne	Bessie Barriscale, Forrest Stanley	Drama	FBO
Number 17	George Beranger	George Walsh, Louis Wolheim	Adventure	Fox Film
Number 99	Ernest C. Warde	J. Warren Kerrigan, Fritzi Brunette	Drama	Pathe Exchange
Nurse Marjorie	William Desmond Taylor	Mary Miles Minter, Clyde Fillmore, George Periolat	Drama	Independent

== O ==
Title	Director	Featured Cast	Genre	Note
Occasionally Yours	James W. Horne	Lew Cody, Betty Blythe	Drama	FBO
Officer 666	Harry Beaumont	Tom Moore, Jean Calhoun, Jerome Patrick	Comedy	Goldwyn
Old Dad	Lloyd Ingraham	Mildred Harris, John St. Polis, Myrtle Stedman	Drama	First National
An Old Fashioned Boy	Jerome Storm	Charles Ray, Ethel Shannon	Comedy	Paramount
Old Lady 31	John Ince	Emma Dunn, Henry Harmon	Comedy drama	Metro
On with the Dance	George Fitzmaurice	Mae Murray, David Powell, Holmes Herbert	Drama	Paramount
Once a Plumber	Eddie Lyons	Eddie Lyons, Lee Moran	Comedy	Universal
Once to Every Woman	Allen Holubar	Dorothy Phillips, Margaret Mann	Drama	Universal
One Hour Before Dawn	Henry King	H. B. Warner, Anna Q. Nilsson	Mystery	Pathe Exchange
The Orphan	J. Gordon Edwards	William Farnum, Louise Lovely, Henry Hebert	Western	Fox Film
Other Men's Shoes	Edgar Lewis	Crauford Kent, Irene Boyle	Drama	Pathe Exchange
Out of the Snows	Ralph Ince	Ralph Ince, Zena Keefe	Drama	Selznick
Out of the Storm	William Parke	Barbara Castleton, John Bowers, Sidney Ainsworth	Drama	Goldwyn
Outside the Law	Tod Browning	Priscilla Dean, Wheeler Oakman	Crime thriller	Universal
Over the Hill to the Poorhouse	Harry Millarde	Mary Carr, William Welsh, Johnnie Walker	Drama	Fox Film
Overland Red	Lynn Reynolds	Harry Carey, Vola Vale	Western	Universal

== P ==
Title	Director	Featured Cast	Genre	Note
Pagan Love	Hugo Ballin	Mabel Ballin, Togo Yamamoto	Romance	Pathe Exchange
The Palace of Darkened Windows	Henry Kolker	Claire Anderson, Arthur Edmund Carewe, Jay Belasco	Comedy	Select
The Paliser Case	William Parke	Pauline Frederick, Alan Roscoe	Mystery	Goldwyn
Paris Green	Jerome Storm	Charles Ray, Ann May	Comedy	Paramount
Parlor, Bedroom and Bath	Edward Dillon	Ruth Stonehouse, Eugene Pallette	Comedy	Metro
Partners of the Night	Paul Scardon	Pinna Nesbit, William B. Davidson	Drama	Goldwyn
Passers By	J. Stuart Blackton	Herbert Rawlinson, Ellen Cassidy	Drama	Pathe Exchange
Passion's Playground	J. A. Barry	Katherine MacDonald, Norman Kerry	Drama	First National
The Path She Chose	Phil Rosen	Anne Cornwall, J. Farrell McDonald	Drama	Universal
The Peddler of Lies	William C. Dowlan	Frank Mayo, Ora Carew	Mystery	Universal
Peaceful Valley	Jerome Storm	Charles Ray, Harry Myers	Comedy	First National
Pegeen	David Smith	Bessie Love, Edmund Burns	Drama	Vitagraph
The Penalty	Wallace Worsley	Charles Clary, Lon Chaney, Doris Pawn	Crime	Goldwyn
The Perfect Woman	David Kirkland	Constance Talmadge, Charles Meredith	Comedy	First National
The Phantom Melody	Douglas Gerrard	Monroe Salisbury, Henry A. Barrows	Drama	Universal
Pink Tights	B. Reeves Eason	Gladys Walton, Jack Perrin	Romance	Universal
Pinto	Victor Schertzinger	Mabel Normand, Cullen Landis	Western comedy	Goldwyn
The Pleasure Seekers	George Archainbaud	Elaine Hammerstein, Webster Campbell	Drama	Selznick
The Plunger	Dell Henderson	George Walsh, Virginia Valli	Drama	Fox Film
The Point of View	Alan Crosland	Elaine Hammerstein, Rockliffe Fellowes	Drama	Selznick
Polly of the Storm Country	Arthur Rosson	Mildred Harris, Emory Johnson, Charlotte Burton	Drama	First National
Polly With a Past	Leander de Cordova	Ina Claire, Ralph Graves, Marie Wainwright	Drama	Metro
Pollyanna	Paul Powell	Mary Pickford	Drama	United Artists
The Poor Simp	Victor Heerman	Owen Moore, Nell Craig, Harry L. Rattenberry	Comedy	Selznick
Prairie Trails	George Marshall	Tom Mix, Charles K. French	Western	Fox Film
The Prey	George L. Sargent	Harry Benham, Alice Joyce	Drama	Vitagraph
The Price of Redemption	Dallas M. Fitzgerald	Bert Lytell, Seena Owen	Crime	Metro
The Prince Chap	William C. deMille	Thomas Meighan, Kathlyn Williams	Drama	Paramount
The Prince of Avenue A	John Ford	James J. Corbett, Richard Cummings	Drama	Universal
The Purple Cipher	Chester Bennett	Earle Williams, Vola Vale	Mystery	Vitagraph

== R ==
Title	Director	Featured Cast	Genre	Note
Red Foam	Ralph Ince	Zena Keefe, Huntley Gordon	Drama	Selznick
The Red Lane	Lynn Reynolds	Frank Mayo, Lillian Rich	Drama	Universal
Remodeling Her Husband	D. W. Griffith	Dorothy Gish, James Rennie	Comedy	Paramount
Respectable by Proxy	J. Stuart Blackton	Sylvia Breamer, Eulalie Jensen	Drama	Pathe Exchange
The Restless Sex	Robert Z. Leonard	Marion Davies, Carlyle Blackwell	Drama	Paramount
The Revenge of Tarzan	Harry Revier, George M. Merrick	Gene Pollar, Karla Schramm, Estelle Taylor	Adventure	Goldwyn
The Riddle: Woman	Edward José	Geraldine Farrar, Montagu Love, Adele Blood	Drama	Pathe Exchange
Riders of the Dawn	Jack Conway	Roy Stewart, Claire Adams	Western	Pathe Exchange
The Right of Way	John Francis Dillon	Bert Lytell, Gibson Gowland, Leatrice Joy	Drama	Metro
The Right to Love	George Fitzmaurice	Mae Murray, David Powell, Holmes Herbert	Drama	Paramount
Rio Grande	Edwin Carewe	Rosemary Theby, Allan Sears	Western	Pathe Exchange
Risky Business	Rollin S. Sturgeon	Gladys Walton, Lillian Lawrence	Drama	Universal
The River's End	Victor Heerman, Marshall Neilan	Lewis Stone, Marjorie Daw, Jane Novak	Western	First National
The Road of Ambition	William P. S. Earle	Conway Tearle, Gladden James	Drama	Selznick
The Road to Divorce	Phil Rosen	Mary MacLaren, William Ellingford	Drama	Universal
Romance	Chester Withey	Doris Keane, Basil Sydney	Romance	United Artists
The Romance Promoters	Chester Bennett	Earle Williams, Helen Ferguson	Comedy	Vitagraph
A Romantic Adventuress	Harley Knoles	Dorothy Dalton, Charles Meredith	Drama	Paramount
The Rookie's Return	Jack Nelson	Douglas MacLean, Doris May	Comedy	Paramount
Rose of Nome	Edward LeSaint	Gladys Brockwell, William Scott	Drama	Fox Film
Rouge and Riches	Harry L. Franklin	Mary MacLaren, Wallace MacDonald	Drama	Universal
Rogues and Romance	George B. Seitz	June Caprice, Marguerite Courtot	Drama	Pathe Exchange
The Round-Up	George Melford	Roscoe Arbuckle, Irving Cummings, Mabel Julienne Scott	Comedy	Paramount

== S ==
Title	Director	Featured Cast	Genre	Note
The Sagebrusher	Edward Sloman	Marguerite De La Motte, Noah Beery	Western	Pathe Exchange
Sand	Lambert Hillyer	William S. Hart, Mary Thurman	Western	Paramount
The Saphead	Herbert Blaché	Buster Keaton, Edward Connelly	Comedy	Metro
The Scoffer	Allan Dwan	Mary Thurman, Philo McCullough	Drama	First National
Scratch My Back	Sidney Olcott	Helene Chadwick, T. Roy Barnes	Comedy	Goldwyn
The Scuttlers	J. Gordon Edwards	William Farnum, Jackie Saunders	Drama	Fox Film
The Sea Rider	Edwin L. Hollywood	Harry T. Morey, Alice Calhoun	Drama	Vitagraph
The Sea Wolf	George Melford	Noah Beery, Raymond Hatton, Mabel Julienne Scott	Drama	Paramount
The Secret Gift	Harry L. Franklin	Gladys Walton, Lee Kohlmar	Drama	Universal
Seeds of Vengeance	Oliver L. Sellers	Bernard J. Durning, Eugenie Besserer	Drama	Select
The Servant Question	Dell Henderson	William Collier Sr., Virginia Lee	Comedy	Selznick
Sex	Fred Niblo	Louise Glaum, Irving Cummings, Viola Barry	Drama	Pathe Exchange
The Shadow of Rosalie Byrnes	George Archainbaud	Elaine Hammerstein, Edward Langford	Drama	Selznick
The Shark	Dell Henderson	George Walsh, Robert Broderick	Drama	Fox Film
She Couldn't Help It	Maurice S. Campbell	Bebe Daniels, Emory Johnson	Comedy	Independent
She Loves and Lies	Chester Withey	Norma Talmadge, Conway Tearle	Comedy drama	Select
Shod with Fire	Emmett J. Flynn	William Russell, Helen Ferguson	Western	Fox Film
Shore Acres	Rex Ingram	Alice Lake, Robert D. Walker	Drama	Metro
Sick Abed	Sam Wood	Wallace Reid, Bebe Daniels	Comedy	Paramount
The Silent Barrier	William Worthington	Sheldon Lewis, Corinne Barker	Drama	Pathe Exchange
Silk Hosiery	Fred Niblo	Enid Bennett, Geoffrey Webb	Comedy	Paramount
Silk Husbands and Calico Wives	Alfred E. Green	House Peters, Mary Alden	Drama	Independent
The Silver Horde	Frank Lloyd	Myrtle Stedman, Betty Blythe	Adventure	Goldwyn
Simple Souls	Robert Thornby	Blanche Sweet, Charles Meredith	Drama	Pathe Exchange
The Sin That Was His	Hobart Henley	William Faversham, Lucy Cotton, Pedro de Cordoba	Drama	Selznick
Sink or Swim	Richard Stanton	George Walsh, Enid Markey	Comedy	Fox Film
Sinners	Kenneth Webb	Alice Brady, Augusta Anderson	Drama	Independent
The Sins of Rosanne	Tom Forman	Ethel Clayton, Jack Holt, Fontaine La Rue	Drama	Paramount
The Sins of St. Anthony	James Cruze	Bryant Washburn, Lucien Littlefield	Comedy	Paramount
A Sister to Salome	Edward LeSaint	Gladys Brockwell, Edwin B. Tilton	Drama	Fox Film
The Six Best Cellars	Donald Crisp	Wanda Hawley, Bryant Washburn	Comedy	Paramount
The Skywayman	James P. Hogan	Ormer Locklear, Louise Lovely	Drama	Fox Film
A Slave of Vanity	Henry Otto	Pauline Frederick, Arthur Hoyt, Nigel Barrie	Drama	FBO
Slaves of Pride	George Terwilliger	Alice Joyce, Percy Marmont	Drama	Vitagraph
The Slim Princess	Victor Schertzinger	Mabel Normand, Tully Marshall	Comedy	Goldwyn
Smoldering Embers	Frank Keenan	Frank Keenan, Jay Belasco, Katherine Van Buren	Drama	Pathe Exchange
So Long Letty	Al Christie	Colleen Moore, Walter Hiers	Comedy	FBO
Someone in the House	John Ince	Edmund Lowe, Vola Vale	Drama	Metro
Something Different	Roy William Neill	Constance Binney, Lucy Fox, Ward Crane	Drama	Independent
Something to Think About	Cecil B. DeMille	Elliott Dexter, Gloria Swanson, Monte Blue	Drama	Paramount
The Song of the Soul	John W. Noble	Vivian Martin, Fritz Leiber	Drama	Goldwyn
The Soul of Youth	William Desmond Taylor	Lewis Sargent, Lila Lee	Drama	Paramount
Sooner or Later	Wesley Ruggles	Owen Moore, Seena Owen	Comedy	Selznick
The Spirit of Good	Paul Cazeneuve	Madlaine Traverse, Dick La Reno	Drama	Fox Film
A Splendid Hazard	Allan Dwan	Henry B. Walthall, Rosemary Theby	Drama	First National
The Sporting Duchess	George Terwilliger	Alice Joyce, Percy Marmont	Drama	Vitagraph
Square Shooter	Paul Cazeneuve	Buck Jones, Charles K. French	Western	Fox Film
The Star Rover	Edward Sloman	Courtenay Foote, Thelma Percy	Drama	Metro
The Stealers	Christy Cabanne	William H. Tooker, Norma Shearer	Drama	FBO
The Stolen Kiss	Kenneth Webb	Constance Binney, Rod La Rocque	Romance	Independent
Stolen Moments	James Vincent	Rudolph Valentino, Marguerite Namara	Drama	Independent
Stop Thief	Harry Beaumont	Tom Moore, Hazel Daly, Irene Rich	Comedy	Goldwyn
The Strange Boarder	Clarence G. Badger	Will Rogers, Irene Rich	Comedy	Goldwyn
The Street Called Straight	Wallace Worsley	Charles Clary, Naomi Childers, Lawson Butt	Drama	Goldwyn
Stronger Than Death (1920 film)	Robert Z. Leonard	Alla Nazimova, Charles Bryant	Drama	Metro
The Strongest	Raoul Walsh	Renée Adorée, Harrison Hunter	Drama	Fox Film
Suds	John Francis Dillon	Mary Pickford, Albert Austin	Comedy	United Artists
Sundown Slim	Val Paul	Harry Carey, Charles Le Moyne	Western	Universal
Sunset Sprague	Paul Cazeneuve, Thomas N. Heffron	Buck Jones, Patsy De Forest, Henry Hebert	Western	Fox Film
Sweet Lavender	Paul Powell	Mary Miles Minter, Sylvia Ashton, Milton Sills	Drama	Independent

== T ==
Title	Director	Featured Cast	Genre	Note
The Tattlers	Howard M. Mitchell	Madlaine Traverse, Jack Rollens	Drama	Fox Film
His Temporary Wife	Joseph Levering	Rubye De Remer, Edmund Breese, Mary Boland	Comedy	Independent
The Terror	Jacques Jaccard	Tom Mix, Francelia Billington	Western	Fox Film
Terror Island	James Cruze	Harry Houdini, Lila Lee	Adventure	Paramount
The Testing Block	Lambert Hillyer	William S. Hart, Eva Novak	Western	Paramount
The Texan	Lynn Reynolds	Tom Mix, Gloria Hope	Western	Fox Film
The Third Generation	Henry Kolker	Betty Blythe, Mahlon Hamilton	Drama	FBO
The Third Woman	Charles Swickard	Carlyle Blackwell, Louise Lovely, Gloria Hope	Drama	FBO
The Thirteenth Commandment	Robert G. Vignola	Ethel Clayton, Monte Blue, Anna Q. Nilsson	Drama	Paramount
The Thirtieth Piece of Silver	George L. Cox	Margarita Fischer, King Baggot, Forrest Stanley	Drama	Pathe Exchange
39 East	John S. Robertson	Constance Binney, Reginald Denny	Comedy	Independent
$30,000	Ernest C. Warde	J. Warren Kerrigan, Fritzi Brunette, Carl Stockdale	Drama	Pathe Exchange
The Tiger's Coat	Roy Clements	Lawson Butt, Myrtle Stedman	Drama	Pathe Exchange
Thou Art the Man	Thomas N. Heffron	Robert Warwick, Lois Wilson	Drama	Paramount
A Thousand to One	Rowland V. Lee	Hobart Bosworth, Ethel Grey Terry	Drama	Associated Producers
The Tiger's Cub	Charles Giblyn	Pearl White, John Davidson	Drama	Fox Film
To Please One Woman	Lois Weber	Claire Windsor, George Hackathorne	Drama	Paramount
A Tokyo Siren	Norman Dawn	Tsuru Aoki, Peggy Pearce	Drama	Universal
The Toll Gate	Lambert Hillyer	William S. Hart, Anna Q. Nilsson	Western	Paramount
The Tower of Jewels	Tom Terriss	Corinne Griffith, Webster Campbell	Crime	Vitagraph
Treasure Island	Maurice Tourneur	Lon Chaney, Shirley Mason	Adventure	Paramount
3 Gold Coins	Clifford Smith	Tom Mix, Margaret Loomis	Western	Fox Film
The Tree of Knowledge	William C. deMille	Robert Warwick, Kathlyn Williams, Wanda Hawley	Drama	Paramount
The Triflers	Christy Cabanne	Edith Roberts, Forrest Stanley	Drama	Universal
Trumpet Island	Tom Terriss	Marguerite De La Motte, Wallace MacDonald	Drama	Vitagraph
The Truth	Lawrence C. Windom	Madge Kennedy, Thomas Carrigan	Comedy drama	Goldwyn
The Truth About Husbands	Kenneth S. Webb	Anna Lehr, Holmes Herbert	Drama	First National
The Turning Point	J. A. Barry	Katherine MacDonald, Nigel Barrie	Drama	First National
Twin Beds	Lloyd Ingraham	Carter DeHaven, Flora Parker DeHaven, Helen Raymond	Comedy	First National
Twins of Suffering Creek	Scott Dunlap	William Russell, Louise Lovely	Drama	Fox Film
Two Kinds of Love	B. Reeves Eason	Fontaine La Rue, George A. McDaniel	Western	Universal
Two Moons	Edward LeSaint	Buck Jones, Carol Holloway	Western	Fox Film
Two Weeks	Sidney Franklin	Constance Talmadge, Conway Tearle	Romantic comedy	First National

== U ==
Title	Director	Featured Cast	Genre	Note
Uncharted Channels	Henry King	H. B. Warner, Kathryn Adams, Sam de Grasse	Drama	FBO
Under Crimson Skies	Rex Ingram	Elmo Lincoln, Mabel Ballin, Harry von Meter	Adventure	Universal
Under Northern Lights	Jacques Jaccard	Tom London, Virginia Brown Faire	Drama	Universal
Unseen Forces	Sidney Franklin	Sylvia Breamer, Conrad Nagel	Drama	First National
The Untamed	Emmett J. Flynn	Tom Mix, Pauline Starke	Western	Fox Film
Up in Mary's Attic	William Watson	Eva Novak, Harry Gribbon	Comedy	Independent
The U.P. Trail	Jack Conway	Kathlyn Williams, Marguerite De La Motte	Western	Pathe Exchange

== V ==
Title	Director	Featured Cast	Genre	Note
The Valley of Doubt	Burton George	Arline Pretty, Thurston Hall, Anna Lehr	Drama	Selznick
The Valley of Tomorrow	Emmett J. Flynn	William Russell, Mary Thurman	Action	Pathe Exchange
The Very Idea	Lawrence C. Windom	Taylor Holmes, Virginia Valli	Comedy	Metro
The Vice of Fools	Edward H. Griffith	Alice Joyce, Robert Gordon	Drama	Vitagraph
The Village Sleuth	Jerome Storm	Charles Ray, Winifred Westover	Comedy	Paramount
The Virgin of Stamboul	Tod Browning	Priscilla Dean, Wallace Beery	Drama	Universal

== W ==
Title	Director	Featured Cast	Genre	Note
The Walk-Offs	Herbert Blaché	May Allison, Emory Johnson	Comedy	Metro
Wanted at Headquarters	Stuart Paton	Eva Novak, Lee Shumway	Crime	Universal
Water, Water, Everywhere	Clarence G. Badger	Will Rogers, Irene Rich	Comedy	Goldwyn
Way Down East	D. W. Griffith	Lillian Gish, Richard Barthelmess, Lowell Sherman	Drama	United Artists
The Way Women Love	Marcel Perez	Rubye De Remer, Walter Miller	Mystery	Independent
The Web of Deceit	Edwin Carewe	Dolores Cassinelli, Franklyn Hanna	Drama	Pathé Exchange
The Week-End	George L. Cox	Margarita Fischer, Milton Sills	Comedy	Pathe Exchange
West Is West	Val Paul	Harry Carey, Charles Le Moyne	Western	Universal
What Happened to Jones	James Cruze	Bryant Washburn, Margaret Loomis	Comedy	Paramount
What Happened to Rosa	Victor Schertzinger	Mabel Normand, Tully Marshall	Comedy	Goldwyn
What Women Love	Nate Watt	Annette Kellerman, Ralph Lewis	Comedy	First National
What Women Want	George Archainbaud	Louise Huff, Robert Ames	Drama	Independent
What Would You Do?	Denison Clift	Madlaine Traverse, George A. McDaniel	Drama	Fox Film
What's Your Hurry?	Sam Wood	Wallace Reid, Lois Wilson	Drama	Paramount
What's Your Husband Doing?	Lloyd Ingraham	Douglas MacLean, Doris May	Comedy	Paramount
When Dawn Came	Colin Campbell	Lee Shumway, Colleen Moore	Drama	Independent
While New York Sleeps	Charles Brabin	Estelle Taylor, Marc McDermott	Crime	Fox Film
The Whisper Market	George L. Sargent	Corinne Griffith, George MacQuarrie, Eulalie Jensen	Drama	Vitagraph
Whispering Devils	Harry Garson	Conway Tearle, Rosemary Theby	Drama	Independent
Whispers	William P. S. Earle	Elaine Hammerstein, Matt Moore	Drama	Selznick
The White Circle	Maurice Tourneur	Spottiswoode Aitken, Harry Northrup	Drama	Paramount
The White Dove	Henry King	H. B. Warner, Clare Adams	Drama	FBO
White Lies	Edward LeSaint	Gladys Brockwell, Josephine Crowell	Drama	Fox Film
The White Moll	Harry Millarde	Pearl White, Richard Travers	Crime	Fox Film
White Youth	Norman Dawn	Edith Roberts, Alfred Hollingsworth	Drama	Universal
Why Change Your Wife?	Cecil B. DeMille	Gloria Swanson, Thomas Meighan, Bebe Daniels	Comedy	Paramount
Why Women Sin	Burton L. King	Anna Luther, Claire Whitney, Charles K. Gerrard	Drama	Independent
The Willow Tree	Henry Otto	Viola Dana, Edward Connelly	Drama	Metro
Within Our Gates	Oscar Micheaux	Evelyn Preer, Floy Clements	Drama	Independent
The Woman and the Puppet	Reginald Barker	Geraldine Farrar, Lou Tellegen, Dorothy Cumming	Romance	Goldwyn
The Woman Game	William P. S. Earle	Elaine Hammerstein, Florence Billings	Drama	Selznick
The Woman Gives	Roy William Neill	Norma Talmadge, Edmund Lowe	Drama	First National
The Woman God Sent	Laurence Trimble	Zena Keefe, Warren Cook	Drama	Selznick
The Woman in His House	John M. Stahl	Mildred Harris, Ramsey Wallace	Drama	First National
The Woman in Room 13	Frank Lloyd	Pauline Frederick, Richard Tucker	Mystery	Goldwyn
The Woman in the Suitcase	Fred Niblo	Enid Bennett, William Conklin	Drama	Paramount
A Woman Who Understood	William Parke	Bessie Barriscale, Forrest Stanley	Drama	FBO
A Woman's Business	B.A. Rolfe	Olive Tell, Edmund Lowe, Donald Hall	Drama	Independent
Women Men Forget	John M. Stahl	Mollie King, Lucy Fox	Drama	Independent
The Wonder Man	John G. Adolfi	Georges Carpentier, Faire Binney, Florence Billings	Adventure	FBO
The Wonderful Chance	George Archainbaud	Eugene O'Brien, Martha Mansfield	Crime	Selznick
The World and His Wife	Robert G. Vignola	Montagu Love, Alma Rubens, Gaston Glass	Drama	Paramount
A World of Folly	Frank Beal	Vivian Rich, Philo McCullough	Drama	Fox Film
Would You Forgive?	Scott R. Dunlap	Vivian Rich, Tom Chatterton	Drama	Fox Film
The Wrong Woman	Ivan Abramson	Olive Tell, Montagu Love	Drama	Independent

== Y ==
Title	Director	Featured Cast	Genre	Note
The Yellow Typhoon	Edward José	Anita Stewart, Ward Crane, Joseph Kilgour	Drama	First National
Yes or No	Roy William Neill	Norma Talmadge, Frederick Burton, Lowell Sherman	Drama	First National
You Never Can Tell	Chester M. Franklin	Bebe Daniels, Jack Mulhall	Comedy	Independent
Young Mrs. Winthrop	Walter Edwards	Ethel Clayton, Helen Dunbar	Drama	Paramount
Youthful Folly	Alan Crosland	Olive Thomas, Crauford Kent	Drama	Selznick

== Serials ==
Title	Director	Featured Cast	Genre	Note
The $1,000,000 Reward	George A. Lessey	Lillian Walker, Coit Albertson	Drama serial	
Daredevil Jack	W. S. Van Dyke	Jack Dempsey, Josie Sedgwick	Adventure serial	

== Shorts ==
Title	Director	Featured Cast	Genre	Note
Among Those Present	Fred C. Newmeyer	Harold Lloyd, Mildred Davis	Comedy Short	
The Big Catch	Leo D. Maloney	Hoot Gibson	Western Short	
The Brand Blotter		Hoot Gibson	Western	
The Broncho Kid	Mack V. Wright	Hoot Gibson	Western Short	
The Champion Liar	Hoot Gibson	Hoot Gibson	Western Short	
Cinders	Edward Laemmie	Hoot Gibson	Short	
Convict 13	Edward F. Cline, Buster Keaton	Buster Keaton, Joe Roberts	Comedy	
Double Danger	Albert Russell	Hoot Gibson	Western	
An Eastern Westerner	Hal Roach	Harold Lloyd	Comedy	
Fight It Out	Albert Russell	Hoot Gibson	Western	
The Fightin' Terror	Hoot Gibson	Hoot Gibson	Western	
A Gamblin' Fool	Leo D. Maloney	Hoot Gibson	Western	
The Garage	Fatty Arbuckle	Fatty Arbuckle, Buster Keaton	Comedy Short	
Get Out and Get Under	Hal Roach	Harold Lloyd	Comedy	
The Grinning Granger	Leo D. Maloney	Hoot Gibson	Western	
Hair Trigger Stuff	B. Reeves Eason	Hoot Gibson	Western	
Haunted Spooks	Alfred J. Goulding, Hal Roach	Harold Lloyd	Comedy	
Held Up for the Makin's	B. Reeves Eason	Hoot Gibson	Western	
High and Dizzy	Hal Roach	Harold Lloyd	Comedy	
His Nose in the Book	B. Reeves Eason	Hoot Gibson	Western	
His Royal Slyness	Hal Roach	Harold Lloyd, Mildred Davis	Comedy	
'In Wrong' Wright	Albert Russell	Hoot Gibson	Western	
The Jay Bird	Phil Rosen	Hoot Gibson	Western	
The Man with the Punch	Edward Laemmle	Hoot Gibson	Western	
Masked	Mack V. Wright	Hoot Gibson, Virginia Browne Faire	Western	
Number, Please?	Fred C. Newmeyer, Hal Roach	Harold Lloyd	Comedy	
One Law for All	Leo D. Maloney	Hoot Gibson	Western Short	
One Week	Edward F. Cline, Buster Keaton	Buster Keaton	Comedy	
The Rattler's Hiss	B. Reeves Eason	Hoot Gibson	Western	
Roarin' Dan	Phil Rosen	Hoot Gibson	Western	
Runnin' Straight	Arthur J. Flaven	Hoot Gibson	Western	
The Scarecrow	Edward F. Cline, Buster Keaton	Buster Keaton	Comedy Short	
The Sheriff's Oath	Phil Rosen	Hoot Gibson	Western	
Shipwrecked Among Cannibals	William F. Adler		Documentary	
The Shootin' Fool	Hoot Gibson	Hoot Gibson	Western	
The Shootin' Kid	Hoot Gibson	Hoot Gibson	Western	
The Smilin' Kid	Hoot Gibson	Hoot Gibson	Western	
The Stranger	W. C. Tuttle	Hoot Gibson	Western	
Superstition	Edward Laemmle	Hoot Gibson	Western	
Thieves' Clothes	Mack V. Wright	Hoot Gibson, Alma Bennett	Western	
Tipped Off	Albert Russell	Hoot Gibson	Western	
The Trail of the Hound	Albert Russell	Hoot Gibson, Jeff Corey	Western	
The Two-Fisted Lover	Edward Laemmle	Hoot Gibson	Western	
West Is Best	Phil Rosen	Hoot Gibson, Josephine Hill	Western	
Wolf Tracks	Mack V. Wright	Hoot Gibson	Western	

== See also ==
- 1920 in the United States
