= Hoot Gibson filmography =

Actor filmography

This is a complete filmography of American actor Hoot Gibson (August 6, 1892 – August 23, 1962), including his performances between 1910 and 1960. Gibson appeared in more than 200 films.

== Background ==
Gibson's career began in 1910 with early silent film "shorts", and he continued as a movie star once "talkies" were introduced, his first sound film being The Long, Long Trail (1929). Primarily starring in Western films, Gibson worked with many directors, including John Ford, who would direct many popular American Westerns and Civil War films, over his fifty years of film production, including The Horse Soldiers (1959), starring John Wayne, in which Gibson played a supporting role. As with many silent and early recordings, a number of Gibson's films are considered to be lost.

== Filmography ==
Year	Title	Role	Director(s)	Notes
1910	The Two Brothers		D. W. Griffith	Short
1910	Pride of the Range		Francis Boggs	Short
1911	The New Superintendent		Francis Boggs	Short, Uncredited
1912	His Only Son			Short
1913	Cowboy Sports and Pastimes			Short
1913	In the Secret Service			Short
1914	Shotgun Jones	Tom Lattier - the Son	Colin Campbell	Short
1914	The Telltale Knife		William Duncan	Short
1914	The Hazards of Helen	Messenger / Etzer	J.P. McGowan	A film series (or serial); he appeared in Episode 26, "The Wild Engine" (aired May 8, 1915).
1914	The Man from the East	Butler	Tom Mix	Short
1915	Buckshot John	Medicine Show Crowd	Hobart Bosworth	Uncredited
1915	The Man from Texas	Deputy	Tom Mix	Short, Uncredited
1915	The Death Train	Etzer, Doyle's pal	J.P. McGowan	Short
1915	The Pay Train	Orturo	J.P. McGowan	Short
1915	Judge Not; or The Woman of Mona Diggings		Robert Z. Leonard	Uncredited
1915	The Ring of Destiny	Jack	Cleo Madison	Short
1915	Stingaree		James W. Horne	Serial
1916	A Knight of the Range	Bob Graham	Jacques Jaccard	Short
1916	Stampede in the Night	Jack Harding	Jacques Jaccard	Short
1916	The Night Riders		Jacques Jaccard	Short
1916	The Passing of Hell's Crown	The Cowboy	Jacques Jaccard	Short
1916	The Wedding Guest		Jacques Jaccard	Short
1917	The Voice on the Wire		Stuart Paton	
1917	A 44-Calibre Mystery	Joe	Fred Kelsey	Short
1917	The Golden Bullet	"Red" Johnson	Fred Kelsey	Short
1917	The Wrong Man	Chip's pal	Fred Kelsey	Short
1917	Cheyenne's Pal	Cowboy	John Ford	Short
1917	The Soul Herder	Chuck Rafferty	John Ford	Short
1917	Straight Shooting	Danny Morgan (credits) / Sam Turner (titles)	John Ford	
1917	The Texas Sphinx	Bob Giles	Fred Kelsey	Short
1917	The Secret Man	Chuck Fadden	John Ford	
1917	A Marked Man		John Ford	Short
1918	Headin' South		Allan Dwan; Arthur Rosson	
1918	The Woman in the Web	Vassily, Ivan's Brother	Paul Hurst; David Smith	
1918	Play Straight or Fight	Dick Rankin	Paul Hurst	Short
1918	The Midnight Flyer	Danny Morgan	George Marshall	Short
1918	The Branded Man	Sheriff		
1918	Danger, Go Slow		Robert Z. Leonard	Uncredited
1919	The Black Horse Bandit		Harry Harvey	Short
1919	The Fighting Brothers	Lonnie Larkin	John Ford	Short
1919	His Buddy		George Holt	Short
1919	The Rustlers		Reginald Barker	Short
1919	Ace High		George Holt	Short
1919	Rustlers	The Deputy	John Ford	Short
1919	Gun Law	Bart Stevens aka Smoke Gublen	John Ford	Short
1919	The Gun Packer	Gang Leader	John Ford	Short
1919	By Indian Post	Chub	John Ford	Short
1919	Kingdom Come		George Holt	Short
1919	The Fighting Heart		B. Reeves Eason	Short
1919	The Four-Bit Man		B. Reeves Eason	Short
1919	The Jack of Hearts	The Prairie Dog	B. Reeves Eason	Short
1919	The Crow	Tim McKenzie - the Crow	B. Reeves Eason	Short
1919	The Face in the Watch		Edward A. Kull	Short
1919	The Tell Tale Wire	Steve Larmon	B. Reeves Eason	Short
1919	The Trail of the Holdup Man	Bob Watson	George Holt	Short
1919	The Lone Hand	Jeffrey Halley	George Holt	Short
1919	The Double Hold-Up	The Broncho Kid	Phil Rosen	Short
1920	The Jay Bird	Tom Jackson	Phil Rosen	Short
1920	West Is Best		Phil Rosen	Short
1920	Roarin' Dan	Roarin' Dan	Phil Rosen	Short
1920	The Sheriff's Oath		Phil Rosen	Short
1920	Hair Trigger Stuff		B. Reeves Eason	Short
1920	Runnin' Straight		Arthur J. Flaven	Short
1920	Held Up for the Makin's		B. Reeves Eason	Short
1920	The Rattler's Hiss		B. Reeves Eason	Short
1920	His Nose in the Book		B. Reeves Eason	Short
1920	Wolf Tracks		Mack V. Wright	Short
1920	Masked		Mack V. Wright	Short
1920	Thieves' Clothes		Mack V. Wright	Short
1920	The Broncho Kid		Mack V. Wright	Short
1920	The Fightin' Terror		Hoot Gibson	Short
1920	The Shootin' Kid		Hoot Gibson	Short
1920	The Smilin' Kid		Hoot Gibson	Short
1920	The Champion Liar		Hoot Gibson	Short
1920	The Big Catch	Billy Reeves - the Foreman of the Ranch	Leo D. Maloney	Short
1920	A Gamblin' Fool		Leo D. Maloney	Short
1920	The Grinning Granger		Leo D. Maloney	Short
1920	One Law for All		Leo D. Maloney	Short
1920	The Shootin' Fool		Hoot Gibson	Short
1920	'In Wrong' Wright	'In Wrong' Wright	Albert Russell	Short
1920	Cinders	Bing Davidson	Edward Laemmle	Short
1920	Double Danger	Jim Marvin / Jerry Marvin	Albert Russell	Short
1920	The Two-Fisted Lover	Scot McHale	Edward Laemmle	Short
1920	Tipped Off	Billy Steele	Albert Russell	Short
1920	The Stranger			Short
1920	Superstition	Dave Bodie	Edward Laemmle	Short
1920	The Brand Blotter			Short
1920	Fight It Out	Sandy Adams	Albert Russell	Short
1920	The Man with the Punch	The stranger	Edward Laemmle	Short
1920	The Trail of the Hound		Albert Russell	Short
1920	Winning a Home			Short
1921	The Saddle King		Edward Laemmle	Short
1921	The Driftin' Kid	The Driftin' Kid	Albert Russell	Short
1921	Sweet Revenge		Edward Laemmle	Short
1921	Kickaroo		Albert Russell	Short
1921	The Fightin' Fury		Hoot Gibson	Short
1921	Out o' Luck		Hoot Gibson	Short
1921	The Cactus Kid	The Cactus Kid	Lee Kohlmar	Short
1921	Who Was the Man?	The Texas Ranger	Lee Kohlmar	Short
1921	Crossed Clues		William James Craft	Short
1921	Double Crossers		William James Craft	Short
1921	The Wild Wild West		Lee Kohlmar	Short
1921	Bandits Beware		Lee Kohlmar	Short
1921	The Movie Trail		Charles Thompson	Short
1921	The Man Who Woke Up		Lee Kohlmar	Short
1921	Beating the Game		Lee Kohlmar	Short
1921	Action	Sandy Brouke	John Ford	
1921	Red Courage	Pinto Peters	B. Reeves Eason	
1921	Sure Fire	Jeff Bransford	John Ford	
1921	The Fire Eater	Bob Corey	B. Reeves Eason	
1921	The Winning Track			Short
1922	Headin' West	Bill Perkins	William James Craft	
1922	The Bearcat	The Singin' Kid	Edward Sedgwick	
1922	Step on It!	Vic Collins	Jack Conway	
1922	Trimmed	Dale Garland	Harry A. Pollard	
1922	The Loaded Door	Bert Lyons	Harry A. Pollard	
1922	The Galloping Kid	"Simplex" Cox	Nat Ross	
1922	The Lone Hand	Laramie Lad	B. Reeves Eason	
1922	Ridin' Wild	Cyril Henderson	Nat Ross	
1923	Kindled Courage	Andy Walker	William Worthington	
1923	The Gentleman from America	Dennis O'Shane	Edward Sedgwick	
1923	Single Handed	Hector MacKnight	Edward Sedgwick	
1923	Dead Game	"Katy" Didd	Edward Sedgwick	
1923	Double Dealing	Ben Slowbell	Henry Lehrman	
1923	Shootin' for Love	Duke Travis	Edward Sedgwick	
1923	Out of Luck	Sam Pertune	Edward Sedgwick	
1923	Blinky	Geoffrey Arbuthnot Islip (Blinky)	Edward Sedgwick	
1923	The Ramblin' Kid	The Ramblin' Kid	Edward Sedgwick	
1923	The Thrill Chaser	Omar K. Jenkins	Edward Sedgwick	
1924	Hook and Ladder	Ace Cooper	Edward Sedgwick	
1924	Ride for Your Life	Bud Watkins	Edward Sedgwick	
1924	40-Horse Hawkins	Luke Hawkins	Edward Sedgwick	
1924	Broadway or Bust	Dave Hollis	Edward Sedgwick	
1924	Hit and Run	"Swat" Anderson	Edward Sedgwick	
1924	The Sawdust Trail	Clarence Elwood Butts	Edward Sedgwick	
1924	Hello, 'Frisco	Himself	Slim Summerville	
1924	The Ridin' Kid from Powder River	Bud Watkins	Edward Sedgwick	
1925	The Hurricane Kid	The Hurricane Kid	Edward Sedgwick	
1925	The Taming of the West	John Carleton	Arthur Rosson	
1925	The Saddle Hawk	Ben Johnson	Edward Sedgwick	
1925	Let 'er Buck	Bob Carson	Edward Sedgwick	
1925	Spook Ranch	Bill Bangs	Edward Laemmle	
1925	The Calgary Stampede	Dan Malloy	Herbert Blaché	
1926	The Arizona Sweepstakes	Coot Cadigan	Clifford Smith	
1926	Chip of the Flying U	Chip Bennett	Lynn Reynolds	
1926	The Flaming Frontier	Bob Langdon	Edward Sedgwick	
1926	The Phantom Bullet	"Click" Farlane	Clifford Smith	
1926	The Man in the Saddle	Jeff Morgan Jr.	Lynn Reynolds; Clifford Smith	
1926	The Shoot 'Em Up Kid		Hoot Gibson	
1926	The Texas Streak	Chad Pennington / Tommy Hawk	Lynn Reynolds	
1926	The Buckaroo Kid	Ed Harley	Lynn Reynolds	
1927	The Silent Rider	Jerry Alton	Lynn Reynolds	
1927	The Denver Dude	Rodeo Randall	B. Reeves Eason	
1927	Hey! Hey! Cowboy	Jimmie Roberts	Edward Laemmle; Lynn Reynolds	
1927	The Prairie King	Andy Barden	B. Reeves Eason	
1927	The Hero on Horseback	Billy Garford	Del Andrews	
1927	Painted Ponies	Bucky Simms	B. Reeves Eason	
1927	Galloping Fury	Billy Halen	B. Reeves Eason	
1928	The Rawhide Kid	Dennis O'Hara	B. Reeves Eason	
1928	A Trick of Hearts	Benjamin Franklin Tully	B. Reeves Eason	
1928	The Flyin' Cowboy	Bill Hammond	B. Reeves Eason	
1928	The Wild West Show	Rodeo Bill	Del Andrews	
1928	Riding for Fame	Scratch 'Em Hank Scott	B. Reeves Eason	
1928	Clearing the Trail	Pete Watson	B. Reeves Eason	
1928	Burning the Wind	Richard Gordon Jr.	Herbert Blaché; Henry MacRae	
1928	The Danger Rider	Hal "Tucson Joe" Doyle	Henry MacRae	
1929	King of the Rodeo	Montana Kid	Henry MacRae	
1929	Smilin' Guns	Jack Purvin	Henry MacRae	
1929	The Lariat Kid	Tom Richards	B. Reeves Eason	
1929	The Winged Horseman	Skyball Smith	B. Reeves Eason; Arthur Rosson	A stuntwoman, Leta Belle Wichart, was killed doubling for Ruth Elder. Wichart fell 3,000 feet without her parachute opening. She was 22 or 23 years old and reputed to be one of the most experienced woman jumpers in the USA.
1929	Points West	Cole Lawson Jr.	Arthur Rosson	
1929	The Long Long Trail	The Ramblin' Kid	Arthur Rosson	
1929	Courtin' Wildcats	Clarence Butts	Jerome Storm	
1930	The Mounted Stranger	Pete Ainslee aka The Ridin' Kid	Arthur Rosson	
1930	Trailing Trouble	Ed King	Arthur Rosson	
1930	Roaring Ranch	Jim Dailey	B. Reeves Eason	
1930	Trigger Tricks	Texas Ranger Tim Brennan	B. Reeves Eason	
1930	Spurs	Bob Merril	B. Reeves Eason	
1930	The Concentratin' Kid	Concentratin' Kid	Arthur Rosson	
1931	Clearing the Range	Curt "El Capitan" Fremont	Otto Brower	
1931	Wild Horse	Jim Wright	Sidney Algier; Richard Thorpe	
1931	Hard Hombre	William Penn "Peaceful" Patton	Otto Brower	
1931	Wir schalten um auf Hollywood	Himself	Uncredited	
1932	The Local Bad Man	Jim Bonner	Otto Brower	
1932	The Gay Buckaroo	Clint Hale	Phil Rosen	
1932	Spirit of the West	Johnny Ringo posing as Ben Bailey	Otto Brower	
1932	A Man's Land	Tex Mason	Phil Rosen	
1932	The Boiling Point	Jimmy Duncan	George Melford	
1932	Cowboy Counsellor	Dan Alton	George Melford	
1933	The Dude Bandit	"Ace" Cooper posing as Tex	George Melford	
1933	The Fighting Parson	Steve Hartley	Harry L. Fraser	
1935	Sunset Range	"Reasonin'" Bates	Ray McCarey	
1935	Rainbow's End	Neil Gibson Jr.	Norval Spencer	
1935	Powdersmoke Range	Stony Brooke	Wallace Fox	
1935	Frontier Justice	Brent Halston	Robert F. McGowan	
1935	Swifty	Swifty	Alan James	
1936	Lucky Terror	Lucky Carson aka The Lucky Terror	Alan James	
1936	Feud of the West	"Whitey" Revell	Harry L. Fraser	
1936	The Last Outlaw	Chuck Wilson	Christy Cabanne	
1936	The Riding Avenger	Buck "The Morning Glory Kid" Bonner	Harry L. Fraser	
1936	Cavalcade of the West	Clint Knox	Harry L. Fraser	
1937	The Painted Stallion	Walter Jamison	Alan James; Ray Taylor; William Witney	12-episode movie serial; 212 minute running time.
1938	The Painted Stallion	Walter Jamison	Alan James; Ray Taylor; William Witney	67-minute-long feature version produced from editing the 1937 series footage together.
1943	Wild Horse Stampede	Marshal Hoot Gibson	Alan James	
1943	The Law Rides Again	U.S. Marshal Hoot Gibson	Ken Maynard	
1943	Blazing Guns	Marshal Hoot Gibson	Robert Emmett Tansey	
1943	Death Valley Rangers	Hoot Gibson	Robert Emmett Tansey	
1944	Westward Bound	Hoot Gibson	Robert Emmett Tansey	
1944	Arizona Whirlwind	Hoot Gibson	Robert Emmett Tansey	
1944	Outlaw Trail	Hoot Gibson	Robert Emmett Tansey	
1944	Sonora Stagecoach	Hoot Gibson	Robert Emmett Tansey	
1944	Marked Trails	Hoot Parkford	John P. McCarthy	
1944	The Utah Kid	Marshal Hoot Higgins	Vernon Keays	
1944	Trigger Law	Hoot Gibson	Vernon Keays	
1946	Flight to Nowhere	Sheriff Bradley	William Rowland	
1953	The Marshal's Daughter	Marshal Ben Dawson	William A. Berke	
1959	The Horse Soldiers	Sgt. Brown	John Ford	
1960	Ocean's 11	Roadblock Deputy	Lewis Milestone	Uncredited, (final film role)
