= Double Danger =

Double Danger can refer to:

- Double Danger (1920 film), a 1920 silent film
- Double Danger (1938 film), a 1938 film
