= Tipped Off =

Tipped Off may refer to:

- Tipped Off (1920 film), American short silent Western film
- Tipped Off (1923 film), American silent drama film
