= The Secret Four =

1921 film by Albert Russell and Perry N. Vekroff

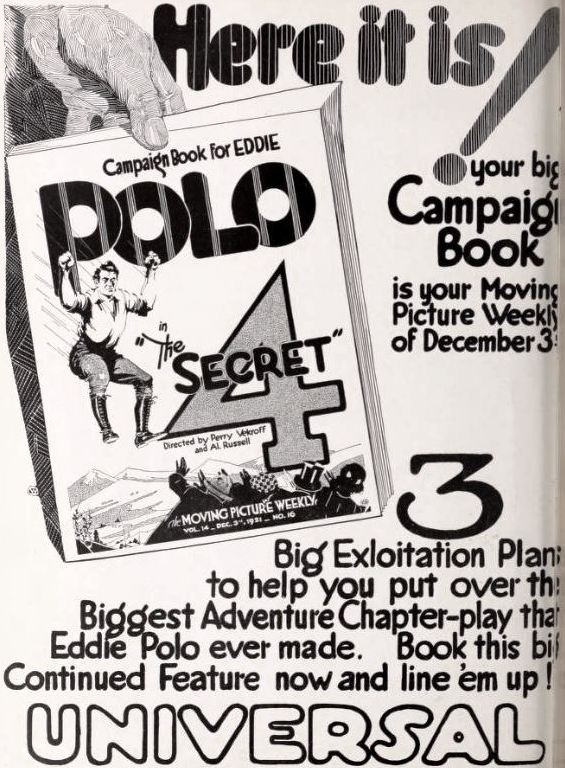
- Advertisement
- Directed by: Albert Russell; Perry N. Vekroff
- Written by: Anthony Coldeway
- Starring: Eddie Polo; Kathleen Myers
- Distributed by: Universal Film Manufacturing Co.
- Release date: December 19, 1921
- Running time: 15 episodes
- Country: United States
- Language: Silent (English intertitles)

The Secret Four is a 1921 American action film serial directed by Albert Russell and Perry N. Vekroff. The film is now considered lost.

== Plot ==
International spies compete to seize world power by cornering the market in oil supplies in the United States.

== Cast ==
- Eddie Polo
- Kathleen Myers
- Doris Deane
- Hal Wilson
- William Welsh
- Thelma Daniels

== Chapter titles ==
1. Behind the Mask
2. The House of Intrigue
3. Across the Chasm
4. The Dive of Despair
5. Black Waters
6. The Highway of Fate
7. The Creeping Doom
8. The Flaming Forest
9. The Fight in the Dark
10. The Burning Pit
11. The Stampede of Death
12. Floods of Fury
13. The Man Trap
14. The Hour of Twelve
15. Black Gold

== See also ==
- List of film serials
- List of film serials by studio
- List of lost films
