= Fight It Out =

1920 film

- Directed by: Albert Russell
- Written by: Ford Beebe; W. C. Tuttle
- Starring: Hoot Gibson
- Cinematography: Alfred H. Lathem
- Release date: December 11, 1920
- Running time: 20 minutes
- Country: United States
- Languages: Silent; English intertitles

Fight It Out is a 1920 American short silent Western film directed by Albert Russell and starring Hoot Gibson.

== Plot ==
Sandy Adams, a western cowboy, discovers a gang's plot. The gang planned to frame a local rancher, Duncan McKenna, for a spree of cattle thefts. In response, Sandy Adams methodically turns members of the gang against each other.

== Cast ==
- Hoot Gibson as Sandy Adams
- Charles Newton as Duncan McKenna
- Jim Corey as Slim Allen
- Dorothy Wood as Jane McKenna
- Ben Corbett as Henchman

== See also ==
- List of American films of 1920
- Hoot Gibson filmography
