= Kickaroo =

1921 film

- Directed by: Albert Russell
- Written by: Ford Beebe; George Morgan
- Starring: Hoot Gibson
- Release date: January 22, 1921
- Running time: 20 minutes
- Country: United States
- Languages: Silent; English intertitles

Kickaroo is a 1921 American short silent Western film directed by Albert Russell and featuring Hoot Gibson.

== Plot ==
This plot comes from the original Library of Congress copyright registration:

Buck McGrew is courting Molly, daughter of O'Neill of the Star Cross Ranch. Joe Lee also desires Molly and is envious of Buck. He is only waiting an opportunity to discredit Buck in her eyes. Buck is very fond of drink and is trying hard for Molly's sake to give it up.

One Sunday when Buck is waiting for Molly to go driving he meets one of the punchers of the Star Cross ranch who has a brand new drink with lots of kick in it. They go into the bunk house to test it, and when they open the first bottle it makes a terrific explosion, which brings Molly, Joe and O'Neill to the scene. Molly then and there tells Buck she will give him one more chance, and if he ever tastes a drop again she is through with him. It is then that Joe conceives the brilliant idea of doping Buck, thus discrediting him forever in Molly's eyes. He meets him one day and offers him a bottle which he says is called "kickaroo" with a great kick in it. Buck at first resists, but the temptation proves too great, and he takes just a "taste." He presents himself at the O'Neill house in a drunken state, and Molly decides once and for all to break Buck of his bad habit.

When Buck awakes he finds himself stretched out on a table with a sheet over him, and discovers every one mourning for him. He jumps up, but no one seems to see him. They have a coffin built and a grave dug, and Buck finally doesn't know whether he is dead or not. He notices the headboard of the grave, on which is a verse to the effect that Buck McGrew died from the effect of too much "kickaroo." Joe comes on the scene, and seeing the mournful preparations thinks he has killed Buck. Then when he sees Buck he thinks it is his spirit and is terror-stricken. In his terror he confesses to having doped Buck, but says he didn't intend to kill him. They see mourners carrying the coffin to the grave (all for Buck's benefit, of course), and Buck forces Joe to go up to the grave and confess that he had doped him. They are dumbfounded, and Molly goes into Buck's arms. Joe tries to make a getaway, but Buck sees him, and, pushing Molly aside, gives chase.

— George Morgan (original story) and Ford Beebe (scenario)

== Cast ==
- Hoot Gibson as Buck McGrew
- Gertrude Olmstead as Mollie O'Neill
- Otto Nelson as Rawhide O'Neill
- Ben Corbett as Joe Lee

== See also ==
- Hoot Gibson filmography
