= Lone Fighter =

1923 film

- Directed by: Albert Russell
- Produced by: Anthony J. Xydias
- Starring: J.B. Warner; Vester Pegg; Josephine Hill
- Production company: Sunset Productions
- Distributed by: Aywon Film Corporation
- Release date: November 1, 1923
- Running time: 50 minutes
- Country: United States
- Language: Silent (English intertitles)

Lone Fighter is a 1923 American silent Western film directed by Albert Russell and starring J.B. Warner, Vester Pegg, and Josephine Hill.

== Plot ==
As described in a film magazine review, Certain Lee, a Texas Ranger, is trailing an outlaw band headed by Macklyn Vance. Lee falls in love with Rose Trimball. She is convinced by Vance that Lee is responsible for the jailing of Harvey Bates, the man she had promised to marry. Rose betrays Lee into the hands of the gang. He escapes after his horse assists in untying his bonds. Bates breaks out of jail and tells Rose that Vance is his enemy. Bates and Vance meet, fight at the edge of a cliff, fall over and are killed. Lee then wins the affections of Rose.

== Cast ==
- J.B. Warner as Certain Lee
- Vester Pegg as Harvey Bates
- Josephine Hill as Rose Trimball
- Joe Ryan as Macklyn Vance
- Jim Gamble as Patrick Trimball
