= The Fightin' Terror =

1920 film

- Directed by: Hoot Gibson
- Written by: Harvey Gates
- Starring: Hoot Gibson
- Production company: Universal Film Manufacturing Company
- Distributed by: Universal Film Manufacturing Company
- Release date: June 19, 1920
- Running time: 20 minutes
- Country: United States
- Languages: Silent; English intertitles

The Fightin' Terror is a 1920 American short silent Western film directed by and featuring Hoot Gibson.

== Plot ==
According to a film magazine, "John Burrows, Professor of entomology, is on a visit to Arizona with his daughter Alice, for their annual vacation. On their way they are chased by a fearless character known in the vicinity as "The Fightin' Terror," who wanted to let them know that a tire had dropped from the rear of the auto. They are overcome with fear and ride wildly to town to inform the sheriff, who, himself, is not overly anxious to meet this demon fighter. After the "Terror" makes known his reason for this wild chase, they are all relieved and the Professor introduces himself and his daughter, emphasizing the fact that he is in Arizona to study the life of the "Fairy Queens." The Terror misunderstands his mission and takes him to one of the dance halls inhabited by many of the dancing girls. Alice is shocked and upbraids the "Terror" for his seemingly funny actions. They leave in disgust and start to look for a place to stay while in Arizona. Dick LaRue offers his house for their convenience and they accept. Dick makes hay while the sun shines and the "Terror" is rebuffed by Alice when he offers her a bunch of fish for the dinner, which he caught himself, in order to make amends for the seeming joke which he played unknowingly.

The Professor tells the "Terror" about a certain species of butterfly which he desires and the "Terror" starts on a hunt for butterflies. He finally gets the desired one and makes a present of it to the Professor, thereby winning back the good graces of Alice.

The "Terror" goes back to town and is informed by the Sheriff that the Professor is wanted for leaving with the college funds. The "Terror" goes back to secure the butterfly from the Professor but it has disappeared.

Dick LaRue has told Alice about a fight which has been arranged between the "Terror" and Slug Martin, his opponent, and Alice has secured the "Terror's" promise not to go through with this fight. But when the "Terror" finds that only one thousand dollars can save the Professor, he takes on his opponent and knocks him out, thereby winning the one thousand dollars and saving the Professor from arrest. After Alice finds out the circumstances which prompted the "Terror" to forget his promise, she forgives him. Dick LaRue, who has attempted to make an attack upon Alice, is beaten by the "Terror" who also finds upon him the butterfly which was lost. Dick is turned over to the sheriff, as the "Terror" sweeps Alice into his arms."

== Cast ==
- Hoot Gibson as The Fightin' Terror
- Yvette Mitchell as Alice
- Jim Corey as Jack Fenton
- Mark Fenton as John Burrows, Professor
- George Rand as Dick LaRue
- Harry Tenbrook as Slug Martin

== See also ==
- List of American films of 1920
- Hoot Gibson filmography
