= The White Horseman =

1921 film

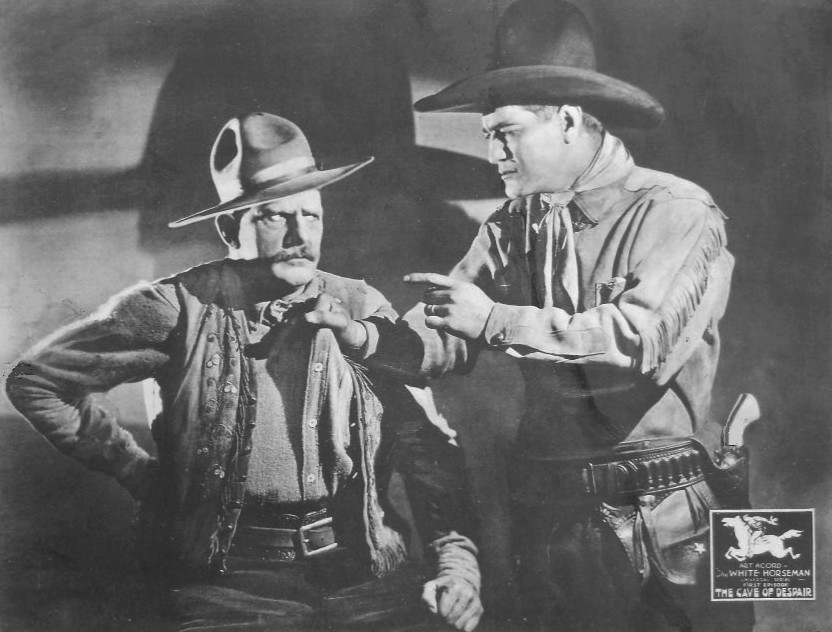
- Lobby card from "Cave of Despair"
- Directed by: Albert Russell
- Written by: Ford Beebe; Albert Russell
- Produced by: William Lord Wright
- Starring: Art Acord; Eva Forrestor
- Distributed by: Universal Film Manufacturing Co.
- Release date: May 30, 1921
- Running time: 18 episodes
- Country: United States
- Languages: Silent; English intertitles

The White Horseman is a 1921 American silent Western film serial directed by Albert Russell. The serial consisted of eighteen episodes and is now considered lost although some print clippings are known to have survived.

== Cast ==
- Art Acord as Wayne Allen / The White Horseman
- Eva Forrestor as Jean Ramsey (as Iva Forrester)
- Duke R. Lee as John Ramsey / Sam Ramsey / The Mummy Man
- Beatrice Dominguez as Zona
- Hank Bell as The White Spider
- Tote Du Crow as Cuevas
- Marie Tropic as Onava

== Chapters ==
1. Cave of Despair
2. The Spider's Web
3. The Mummy Man
4. The Death Trap
5. Trails of Treachery
6. Furnace of Fear
7. Brink of Eternity
8. Pit of Evil
9. The Opal Bracelet
10. In the Enemy's Hands
11. A Race with Death
12. The Bridge of Fear
13. The Hill of Horror
14. A Jest of Fate
15. A Conquest of Courage
16. Fire of Fury
17. The Wings of Destiny
18. The Avenging Conscience

== See also ==
- List of film serials
- List of film serials by studio
