= The Shootin' Fool =

1920 film

- Directed by: Hoot Gibson
- Written by: Jeanne Spencer; F. Hadden Ware
- Starring: Hoot Gibson
- Production company: Universal Film Manufacturing Company
- Distributed by: Universal Film Manufacturing Company
- Release date: October 23, 1920
- Running time: 20 minutes
- Country: United States
- Languages: Silent; English intertitles

The Shootin' Fool is a 1920 American short silent Western film directed by and featuring Hoot Gibson. There was a 1926 Pathé animated short of the same name.

== Plot ==
This plot come from the Library of Congress copyright registration, initially listed as "Some Shooter." Some of the movie posters have this title instead of "The Shootin' Fool."

One of the favorite sports of Tim Morgan was to keep everyone on edge by his daring shooting—which he did just to keep in practice. No one had the courage to tell Tim what a nuisance his practicing was to the community until Daisy McAlester and her father, in quest of a climate beneficial for his health, happened along during one of Tim's sprees and got in the way of one of his wild shots. Dorothy had the foliage on the top of her hat shot off. When Tim learnt of his latest deed, he lost no time in apologizing, much to the amusement of the recipient, who rather took a fancy to him and his frankness.

Daisy and her father register at the hotel in Prickly Heat, where a recent arrival, James Durbin, is attracted by their somewhat crude methods. He overhears Daisy and her father discuss where to put their worldly possessions for safe keeping, and determines upon a plan to get hold of the money while they are out looking for a ranch to purchase.

On their way to look at a ranch, Daisy and her father are held up by some ruffians who demand the money. Tim, who is practicing his favorite pastime nearby, hears their pleas for help and rushes to their assistance, making prisoners of the thieves. Durbin, who has accompanied Daisy and her father, covers Tim with a gun and makes it appear as if Tim is one of the crooks, inasmuch as he has in his possession the money which he took from the crooks when they were caught. Things look hazy for Tim until the sheriff compares the photo he has in a letter for the arrest of a noted criminal lurking somewhere in the West with the man before him, James Durbin. Quickly noticing the similarity, the sheriff shows Durbin the letter. Durbin confesses his guilt by attempting to gain the upper hand on the sheriff and the crowd. He is soon overpowered and taken to jail.

A few years later we see Tim and Daisy—Tim receiving a severe tongue lashing at the hands of Daisy, who is now his wife, for engaging in his favorite pastime in front of their youngsters.

— F. Hadden Ware and his spouse Jeanne Spencer (Ware), scenario writers

== Cast ==
- Hoot Gibson as Tim Morgan
- Dorothy Wood as Daisy McAlester
- Jim Corey as James Durbin
- James Gibson as Father

== See also ==
- Hoot Gibson filmography
