= The Rattler's Hiss =

1920 film

- Directed by: B. Reeves Eason
- Written by: George Hively
- Starring: Hoot Gibson
- Distributed by: Universal Film Manufacturing Company
- Release date: March 22, 1920
- Running time: 20 minutes
- Country: United States
- Languages: Silent; English intertitles

The Rattler's Hiss is a 1920 American short silent Western film directed by B. Reeves Eason.

== Plot ==
According to a film magazine, "The mid-summer life of the Circle C Ranch would have been pretty quiet had it not been for two things — the practical joking of Larry Donovan, the boss of the ranch, and the presence of "Dusky" Walters and his band of outlaws and cattle thieves in the neighborhood. Larry did not know about the band and probably he would have cared less if he had known for all Larry cared about was his little joke and he carried this to extremes. The only person Larry took seriously was Marjorie Taylor whose father owned the neighboring ranch, and he was willing and anxious to surrender to her for life.

One day when he was calling on Marjorie, her father came in with a set of green rattles and a large sized shudder. "That's the fifth rattler I've killed to-day!" he declared. Everyone hated rattlers and the peculiar and unmistakable noise that the reptile makes just before he is going to strike would cause a mummy to jump out of its swathings. The episode put a new idea into Larry's head and he began to practice the hiss of the rattler until he had it down fine. He tried it on the gang when he went home, and twenty men jumped forty feet in the air.

Just then came word that Dusky Walters had been cornered in Turtle Canyon and the whole gang rushed to cut them off at the pass. Most of the band were captured, but Walters and two of his men came through, though Walters had a bullet in his aim from Larry's gun. He decided to get even with Larry by stealing his girl and taking her to a cabin on the desert. He knew that Larry would follow and he was ready for him. As Larry got to a poisoned spring with his mouth parched and his eyes red and bleary, Walters rose up from the other side of the spring with a gun in either hand. He had the drop but Larry was a quick thinker. The next instant Walters heard the dreaded hiss of the rattler and he jumped just the same as any one else would have jumped. Only when he came down he was looking into Larry's gun. So the rattler's hiss finally brought Larry to the cabin just in time to save the girl from two lieutenants of Walters'."

== Cast ==
- Hoot Gibson as Larry Donovan
- Mildred Moore as Marjorie Taylor
- Tote Du Crow as Zeb Taylor
- George Field as "Dusky" Walters

== Censorship ==
Before The Rattler's Hiss could be exhibited in Kansas, several intertitles and scenes had to be eliminated from reel 2. The titles removed were "Give us a kiss", "It's not you she wants to kiss", and "Cut the cards for her", and all struggle scenes except the rescue.

== See also ==
- Hoot Gibson filmography
