= Thelma Percy =

British film actress

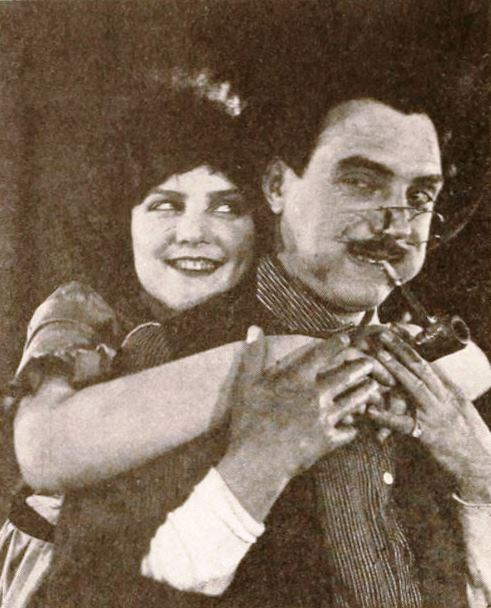
- Percy with Max Linder in Seven Years Bad Luck (1921)
- Born: 20 October 1903; Belfast, Northern Ireland
- Died: 6 July 1970 (aged 66); Santa Monica, California, US
- Occupation: Actress
- Years active: 1920–1922
- Spouse: W.A. Brady Jr (m. 1920)

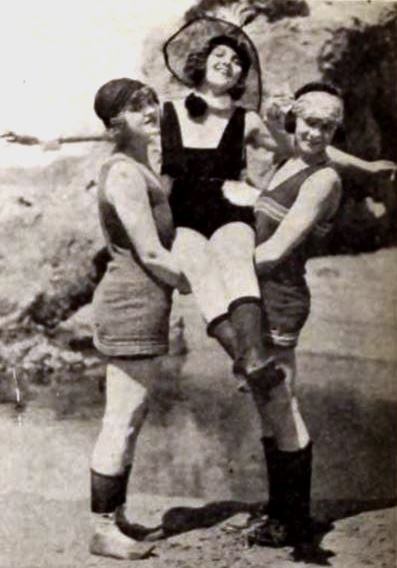

Thelma Agnes Percy (October 20, 1903 – July 6, 1970) was an Irish-American actress. She was born in Belfast, Northern Ireland. Fellow actress Eileen Percy was her sister. She appeared on stage in the 1922 show The Blushing Bride. Percy died in Santa Monica, California.

== Filmography ==
- The Vanishing Dagger (1920) as Elizabeth Latimer
- The Beggar Prince (1920) as Sosad
- Wolf Tracks (1920)
- The Stage Hand (1920) as The Animal Trainer
- The Star Rover (1920) as Faith Levering
- Seven Years Bad Luck (1921) as Station Agent's Daughter
- High and Dry (1921)
