= His Nose in the Book =

1920 film

- Directed by: B. Reeves Eason
- Written by: B. Reeves Eason; Henry Murray
- Starring: Hoot Gibson
- Distributed by: Universal Film Manufacturing Company
- Release date: April 17, 1920
- Running time: 20 minutes
- Country: United States
- Languages: Silent; English intertitles

His Nose in the Book (also known as The Texas Kid) is a 1920 American short silent Western film directed by B. Reeves Eason and featuring Hoot Gibson.

== Plot ==
According to the copyright description, "Pop Carson had a very fine ranch and it was going along smoothly but Pop was much more interested in his books than he was in being the management of the ranch. Nothing but the wildest melodrama and detective stories satisfied Pop and when he got his nose in a book of this kind, an earthquake would not shake it out again.

Bobby his six year old son was an imp of mischief who took every advantage of his father’s literary preoccupation to play pranks on him. If it had not been for Mrs. Carson, Pop would have forgotten even to draw the monthly pay for the payroll. Ramirez was the leader of a small band of desperadoes who were fearful of their skins to work in the open but who were ready for any desperate capers that did not look too dangerous. Seeing the big wad of money which Carson was carrying home, they decided to annex it in some manner and Carson had no sooner reached home than one of the desperadoes stole little Bobby and left a note that he would be held at a certain cabin for ransom, the ransom mentioned being approximately the size of the payroll.

Bobby was left to play with an old Indian in the cabin while the desperadoes stationed themselves to watch the approach of Carson whom they had warned to come alone. He came, and after he had been blindfolded, was taken to the cabin but to his astonishment and to the dismay of the desperadoes, little Bobby was no-wheres to be seen. He had wandered out into the desert alone. The shock to the men was so great that Carson got the drop on them and tied them up. Then he and his wife, who had in the meantime appeared on the scene, and the old Indian, following separate trails, started out, and after an all day’s search found little Bobby and all was well."

== Cast ==
- Hoot Gibson as Pop Carson
- Mildred Moore as Mrs. Carson
- B. Reeves Eason Jr. as Bobby Carson
- Jim Corey
- George Field as Ramirez
- Tom London credited as Leonard Clapham

== See also ==
- Hoot Gibson filmography
