= The Smilin' Kid =

1920 film

- Directed by: Hoot Gibson
- Written by: Arthur Henry Gooden; Robert J. Horner
- Starring: Hoot Gibson
- Production company: Universal Film Manufacturing Company
- Distributed by: Universal Film Manufacturing Company
- Release date: August 21, 1920
- Running time: 20 minutes
- Country: United States
- Languages: Silent; English intertitles

The Smilin' Kid is a 1920 American short silent Western film directed by and featuring Hoot Gibson.

== Plot ==
This plot summary is from the film's copyright registration at the Library of Congress:

Maizie Gray and her widowed mother are squatters on a few acres of the Blue River Range, where they determine to carry out their end of the bitter war always waged between the cowboy and squatter. The girl is wooed by Curly Crow, a designing cowpuncher, whom the mother fears. A smiling stranger appears one day, and the girl falls for his clean-cut manners. He departs, however, warned by Curly Crow to keep away from his reserve. He is more worried, however, by overhearing Curly tell the girl that he, Curly, is the only one that can prevent Cal Cady, boss of the Blue River Range, from ejecting them from their little homestead.

Stranger sets out in search of Curly Crow, who has joined the forces of Scorpion, bandit chieftain, at his hiding place. He comes across Scorpion mistreating Chicquita, whom he has stolen from her people. In the fight that ensues, Stranger is captured and tied to a scaffold, but a stogie which Scorpion has stuck in his mouth, proves a life-saver, for he burns the rope with its fire and dashes back to the Morgan ranch, where he gives the alarm, and, together with the cowpunchers, he captures the bandits.

Later Maizie goes to the haystack for an armful of hay, and uncovers the face of Curly Crow. Her screams bring her mother on the scene, and together they discover the entire gang gagged in the haystack. But their surprise is still greater when they discover that Stranger is no other than Cal Cady, boss of the range, whom they had so feared. Maizie, in trepidation, asks Cal if he will make them move, as Curly had threatened, and Cal smilingly answers: "Maybe if you let me come to see you—lots—I'll let you stay—for a while."

— Robert J. Horner, scenario writer (from a story by Arthur Henry Gooden)

== Cast ==
- Hoot Gibson
- Dorothy Wood
- Lucille Rubey credited as Lucille Ruby
- Mary Royce
- Jim Corey

== See also ==
- Hoot Gibson filmography
