= 'In Wrong' Wright =

1920 film

- Directed by: Albert Russell
- Written by: Ford Beebe
- Starring: Hoot Gibson
- Production company: Universal Film Manufacturing Company
- Distributed by: Universal Film Manufacturing Company
- Release date: October 30, 1920
- Running time: 20 minutes
- Country: United States
- Languages: Silent; English intertitles

'In Wrong' Wright is a 1920 American silent Western film directed by Albert Russell and starring Hoot Gibson.

== Plot ==
According to a film magazine, "Although "In Wrong" Wright and Bob Hall are friendly rivals in everything they undertake to do, yet they are inseparable pals until the more deadly of the sex, Mary by name, the niece of the boss, arrives for a visit to the ranch. Wright and Hall pick cards to see who will be the lucky one to meet her at the station and Hall wins. On the way back to the ranch he tries to make Wright appear as a villain to Mary and when she arrives at the ranch and is greeted by Wright, "In Wrong" is greeted with a rebuff.

Wright determines right then to prove to her that he is not so bad as painted but in every endeavor to justify his claim of being a gentle-themselves when Mary happens along and get Wright in worse. Mary decides to take a ride one morning and wanders away alone. She soon loses her way in the mountains and finally decides to rest in a cabin nearby. The boys in the meantime learning of her absence become alarmed and start out on a hunt. Wright again "gets in wrong" with Mary when after being found, she locates him sound asleep near the ranch and accuses him of showing no interest whatsoever in helping find her.

Wright learns that Hall was the one that located Mary and remained with her at the cabin. Thinking Hall has betrayed her confidence, Wright starts after Hall, who has left the ranch for parts unknown. When Wright finds that Hall is missing, he is firmly convinced that his convictions were true. He finds Hall and forces him back to the ranch at the point of a gun to marry Mary, thinking he has wronged the girl. He then learns that no harm was done and that Hall left because Mary had refused him her hand in marriage. Again Wright sees that he has "gummed" the deal and is about disgusted until Mary tells him that he is not so bad after all and that she has always understood his intentions."

== Cast ==
- Hoot Gibson as Jack Wright
- Dorothy Wood as Mary Brown
- Harry Jackson as Foreman
- Charles Herzinger as Father (credited as C.W. Herzinger)
- Tom London as Sheriff (credited as Leonard Clapham)
- Jim Corey as Deputy

== See also ==
- Hoot Gibson filmography
