= Roarin' Dan =

1920 Hoot Gibson short silent film

- Directed by: Phil Rosen
- Written by: Arthur Henry Gooden
- Starring: Hoot Gibson
- Distributed by: Universal Film Manufacturing Company
- Release date: January 24, 1920
- Running time: 20 minutes
- Country: United States
- Languages: Silent; English intertitles

Roarin' Dan is a 1920 American short silent Western film directed by Phil Rosen and featuring Hoot Gibson.

== Plot ==
This plot comes from the original copyright registration at the Library of Congress:

Roarin' Dan had struck it rich on his claim at Norton's Pass but he didn't know it because he hadn't bothered to follow up the vein. One of his guns had five notches on the stock so Norton's Pass decided that Roarin' Dan was a good man to leave out of a fight. Even Crook Nose Smith, the local bad man, allowed Dan to shout him down in an argument without pulling a gun. But Dan wasn't bad and the notches on his gun were there when he bought the weapon in a pawnshop in San Francisco. However reputation is everything.

Now Dan was well known — in theory — to all the population of the Pass except Susy, the new school-marm from the East, and when Dan met Susy he met a new sensation altogether. Dan decided that all the boys' education was deficient, so taking advantage of a chance meeting with Susy he asked if she would hold a spelling class for them. Susy said yes, but Mrs. McGinnis told her what a bad man Roarin' Dan was, so Susy decided to give the spelling class a miss.

Dan meanwhile had collected the boys and went with him to attend the class. Susy didn't show up, so Dan sent the boys back and went to Susy's house himself. There he kidnapped Susy and took her to the saloon where they put the drinks out of sight and started the spelling class. Susy was furious — so she took the opportunity of showing up Dan as the worst speller in the class. She told him he couldn't spell and to prove that he could, Dan took both his guns and spelt out on the front of the bar with bullet holes the statement "Susy's my gal." Susy fled from the saloon.

Dan drank deep and played high and soon Crook Nose won all his cash. Dan staked his mining claim deed against the pot and — lost. Then he had a quarrel with Crook Nose and Crook Nose's pal hit Dan over the head with a bottle. Dan went to sleep, and Crook Nose and his friend tied him on his horse and turned the animal loose.

From her window Susy saw the figure of Dan lolling over his horse's neck. Finding Dan bleeding and insensible, she led the horse to Dan's cabin, and got him into bed. There she stayed all through the night nursing him.

Crook Nose and his friend meanwhile had a quarrel over the loot they had got from Dan, and Crook Nose announced his intention of mailing the deed for the claim to the land office for a transfer to himself. The friend determined to hold up the stage with the mails and get the deed. So early next morning he lay in wait on the road. Dan came to his senses, left Susy in his cabin and rode down to have it out with Crook Nose. On his way he saw the other crook holding up the stage, so he held up the robber and took the letter with the deed for his own claim back into his keeping. Crook Nose accused Dan of robbing the stage but Dan beat him up and made him and his friend confess the error of their ways. And finally Susy discovered that Dan's spelling wasn't so bad after all.

— Arthur H. Gooden, story and scenario

== Cast ==
- Hoot Gibson as Roarin' Dan
- Leo Pattee as Crook Nose
- Ethel Shannon as Susy
- Mrs. Kruge as Mrs. McGinnis

== Censorship ==
Before Roarin' Dan could be exhibited in Kansas, the Kansas Board of Review required the removal of the stagecoach hold-up scene and the intertitle saying "Because I was with him all night."

== See also ==
- Hoot Gibson filmography
