= Held Up for the Makin's =

1920 film

- Directed by: B. Reeves Eason
- Written by: George W. Hill; Philip Hubbard
- Starring: Hoot Gibson
- Production company: Universal Film Manufacturing Company
- Distributed by: Universal Film Manufacturing Company
- Release date: March 20, 1920
- Running time: 20 minutes
- Country: United States
- Languages: Silent; English intertitles

Held Up for the Makin's is a 1920 American short silent Western film directed by B. Reeves Eason.

== Plot ==
According to a film magazine, "Owing to an unfortunate mix-up in ordering, two towns in the grand and glorious West were deprived of the great indulgence. No, not booze, cigarettes. Goldspur and Lasco, the two towns in question were plumb loco for a smoke. The last pack was put up as a prize and the Bronco Kid won it in the closest race of his career. But over in Goldspur they heard of a small consignment coming on the next stage and decided to go out and meet it.

In the meantime, "No-luck" Eddie Fielding had written to his sister to come out and share the prosperity which he anticipated as the outcome of his claim. The next day he found it was worthless. He brooded over this fact a few weeks and decided that he would have to hold up the stage to get money somehow to. support his sister. As luck would, have it he tried to hold up the stage the tobacco was on, not dreaming that his sister would come on that same stage. But he was not startled enough by seeing her to desist, and he got the fatal "box" and escaped. Only his sister had seen him and the Broncho Kid, who had tried a rescue but had been prevented by the beauty of Stella. When he learned her story he made a break for Eddie's cabin and surprised him in the act of taking out two cartons of cigarettes.

"Terbacer, that's worse than money. They'll lynch you sure if they find that on you." He was right, too. That Goldspur bunch was so rabid that they decided to hold up the stage themselves. They were like a nest of angry hornets when they found that No Luck Eddie had been ahead of them. They descended on the unlucky: Eddie's cabin like a cyclone. But Broncho had planned it all out for the brother of his new divinity. He had blazed a trail with boxes of cigarettes away from the cabin and up into a hollow blind where they lost themselves, and when each cowboy had a cigarette in his mouth he straightway forgot about the heinous crime of No Luck Eddie Fielding."

== Cast ==
- Hoot Gibson as The Broncho Kid
- Mildred Moore as Stella Fielding
- George Field as "Half Portion" Adams

== See also ==
- Hoot Gibson filmography
