= The Sheriff's Oath =

1920 film

- Directed by: Phil Rosen
- Written by: Paul Annixter
- Starring: Hoot Gibson
- Production company: Universal Pictures
- Distributed by: Universal Pictures
- Release date: February 28, 1920
- Running time: 20 minutes; (2 reels)
- Country: United States
- Languages: Silent; English intertitles

The Sheriff's Oath is a 1920 American short silent Western film directed by Phil Rosen and featuring Hoot Gibson. The film was produced and distributed by Universal Pictures.

== Plot ==
According to a film magazine, "Jim Morraine newly elected sheriff of Tenstrike county, calls on Mary Anice to ask her to marry him. He meets her father, who, learning his mission, orders him off the place. Jim's father volunteers to go and see Anice. Meanwhile Bart Hawkins, Jim's rival, has also been kicked off the place by old Anice, for the same reason. Bart's Indian servant, Crowfoot, is gathering firewood in the ravine which separates Anice's cabin from Bart's.

When Old Morraine asks Anice why he objects to Jim, Anice insults him and the two men come to grips. Morraine pulls his gun and fires at Anice who is standing on the brink of a steep slide. Anice, startled, by the shot which misses him and goes through Crowfoot's hat, steps back and tumbles down the slide. He is stunned. Morraine thinking he has killed the old man, resolves to make a get-a-way.

Anice comes too, and struggles to his feet, but Bart who has seen the whole incident, sees a way to get rid of Anice and calmly shoots Anice dead. Crowfoot has seen both incidents. Jim, as sheriff, is brought to the scene of the murder. He knows that his father has been to see Anice, and suspects him. He goes home and finds his father's gun with one sheel [sic] spent. Old Morraine make no attempt to conceal his action from Jim. Jim, however, holds to his oath and arrests his father. His mother casts him off. The verdict of the jury is "Guilty" and the sentence is death. Jim, takes off his badge and resigns his office.

Bart kicks Crowfoot out, on the day of the hanging, and in revenge he goes to Mary and tells her that Bart Hawkins killed her father. Telling Crowfoot to wait in her cabin Mary finds Jim and tells him. Jim phones to the Governor, but he is on an auto trip. Jim tells the sheriff to arrest Bart and tells Mary to get Crowfoot while he rides to intercept the Governor for Morraine's pardon.

He overtakes the Governor, dropping down a cliff into his machine, but the governor does not believe the story. Jim holds him up and tells him he has to get to the jail and stop the hanging or he will get to the other world first. They drive to the jail, arriving twenty minutes before the time set for the hanging. But Crowfoot cannot be found and the Governor says he cannot interfere.

Bart who saw the Indian in Mary's cabin has become suspicious, so he questions the Indian and finding that he has seen the murder, he shoots him. The clock is one minute before the fatal hour, when Crowfoot, just able to crawl, gets to the jail and tells his story before he dies. Morraine is dragged from the scaffold and saved while Bart is held for his double crime. Jim and Mary are united."

== Cast ==
- Hoot Gibson as Jim Morraine
- Arthur Mackley as His Father
- Martha Mattox as His Mother
- Josephine Hill as Mary Anice
- James O'Neill as Her Father (credited as Jim O'Neal)
- J. Herbert Frank as Bart Hawkins (credited as Bert Frank)
- William Harrison as Crowfoot

== See also ==
- Hoot Gibson filmography
