= The Shootin' Kid =

1920 film

- Directed by: Hoot Gibson
- Written by: George W. Pyper
- Starring: Hoot Gibson
- Release date: July 1, 1920
- Running time: 20 minutes
- Country: United States
- Languages: Silent; English intertitles

The Shootin' Kid is a 1920 American silent Western film directed by and featuring Hoot Gibson.

== Plot ==
This summary comes from the Library of Congress copyright registration.

Bud Hazen is an able foreman of a ranch, but he cannot summon the courage to propose to Eva Lord, daughter of the boss. For that reason his punchers poke fun at him. At last Bud decides to propose by letter, and is in the act of copying one from a book, when he gets word that he must help run down a gang of horse thieves. Shorty, posing as one of Bud's punchers, but in reality a spotter for the thieves, writes a warning note to the gang and it is this note which Eva accidentally receives instead of the love letter Bud intended for her. Eva thinks Bud a criminal and is heartbroken. Shorty discovers that Eva knows of the warning, and to silence her, kidnaps her to the thieves' hangout in the hills. Bud, returning for Eva's verdict, finds his unopened note and also the warning note of Shorty. Understanding the whole situation, he races to the rescue, saves Eva and captures the whole gang. Naturally he captures the answer he wanted in addition.

— George W. Pyper, scenario writer

== Cast ==
- Jim Corey as Shorty
- Hoot Gibson as Bud Hazen
- Lucille Ruby as Eva

== See also ==
- Hoot Gibson filmography
