= The Jay Bird =

1920 film

- Directed by: Phil Rosen
- Written by: Jack Jevne
- Starring: Hoot Gibson
- Production company: Universal Film Manufacturing Company
- Distributed by: Universal Film Manufacturing Company
- Release date: January 3, 1920
- Running time: 20 minutes
- Country: United States
- Languages: Silent; English intertitles

The Jay Bird is a 1920 American short silent Western film directed by Phil Rosen and featuring Hoot Gibson.

== Plot ==
This plot comes from the Library of Congress copyright registration:

Tom Jackson was a happy-go-lucky individual whose sole capital was his geniality, and $10 in silver. Frog Flats had one financier and that was Pa Giggles. Tom knew that if he was ever going to win Sally Diggles he would have to establish a financial standing with the old man so he became a depositor in the Diggles Banking Institution and every time he went in to draw out a dollar he got a look at Sally who was the office force. James Wilson and his silent partner, Donovan, had deposited a check for $2,500, with Mr. Diggles for conditions showed a way for a promising smelter operation for Frog Flats in which Watson was to put up a dollar for every local dollar subscribed. Frog Flats put up every dollar that it could raise and of course all of this money went into the bank's safe. The only cloud on Mr. Diggles' horizon was Tom but he had almost forgotten him until Tom told him that he and Sally were going to make arrangements for being engaged and that he was going to build her a house and buy her a ring n'everything. Tom's house and Watson's plans matured at the same time. Watson's plans fitted nicely into a traveling bag and required a time for their execution. While Tom was getting Sally accustomed to the sight of the house which he had built from packing boxes and chicken coups (sic), Watson's valise exploded and blew open the safe which was as he had planned. The shock was so great that it also demolished Tom's house, but his nine dollars worried him more than the house did and his luck was with him too. Before the posse which had been hastily summoned could get into operation, he had both thieves tied at the side of the road and when the excited banker came up he was busy extracting his nine dollars from the smelter funds and other securities. Of course he got the girl and Frog Flats was so grateful that they built them a home.

— Jack Jevne, scenario writer

== Cast ==
- Hoot Gibson as Tom Jackson
- Josephine Hill as Sally Diggles

== Censorship ==
Before The Jay Bird could be exhibited in Kansas, the Kansas Board of Review required the shortening of the struggle scene in the buggy.

== See also ==
- Hoot Gibson filmography
