= Runnin' Straight =

1920 Hoot Gibson silent film

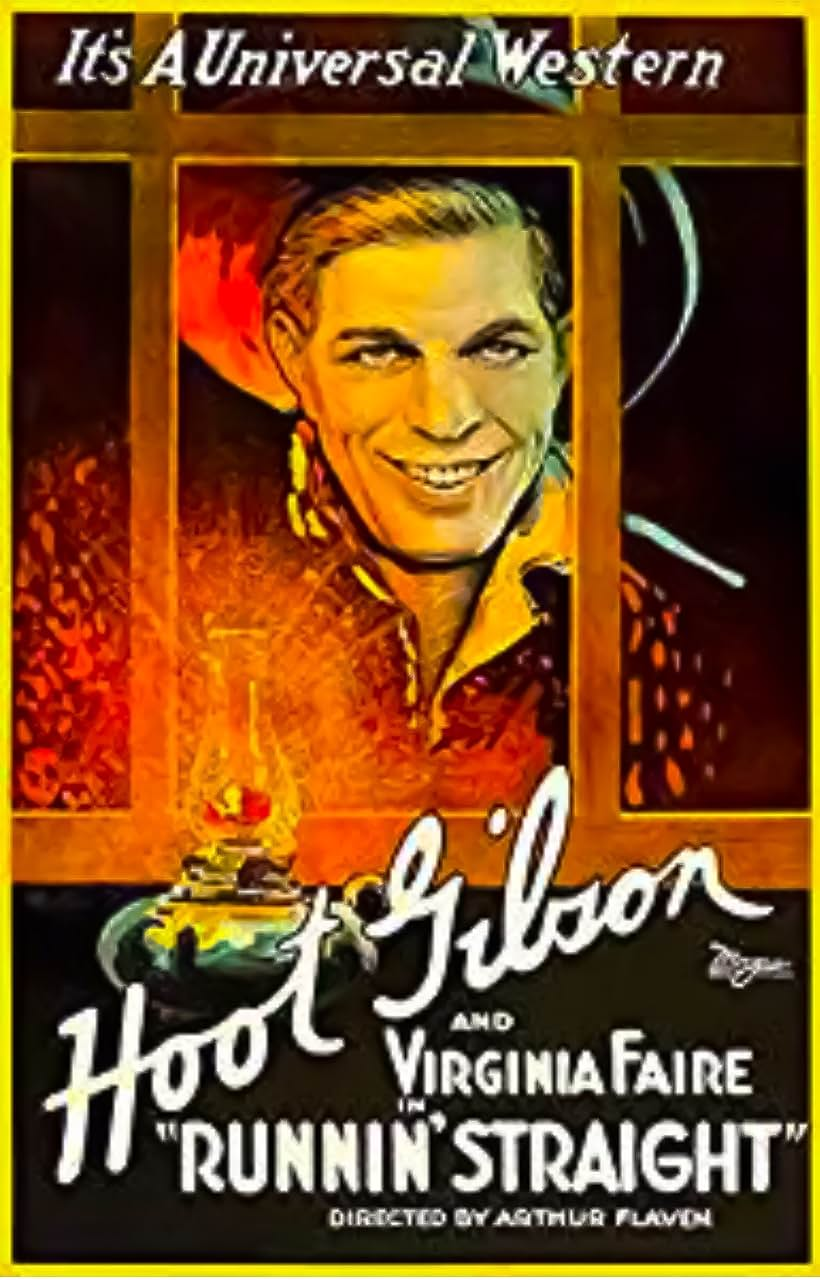
- Directed by: Arthur J. Flaven
- Written by: Philip Hubbard
- Starring: Hoot Gibson
- Release date: March 13, 1920
- Running time: 20 minutes
- Country: United States
- Languages: Silent; English intertitles

Runnin' Straight is a 1920 American short silent Western film directed by Arthur J. Flaven and featuring Hoot Gibson.

== Plot ==
This description comes from the original Library of Congress copyright filing for the film:

Jim Ward, a product of the big city, fell in with the Spider and his gang. These gentry did a flourishing trade in safe-breaking and Jim became adept at twirling the tumbler. With the gang was Maggie — and she and Jim became friends — and more. Then Jim was caught red-handed on one of the Spider's jobs and he retired to Sing-Sing for a stretch. The evidence against Maggie was vague, so she got off.

While Jim was in jail, Maggie thought things over and cut loose from the Spider and when Jim came out, Maggie got word with him before the Spider could spin another web and she made Jim promise to run straight. Jim nearly starved, but he wouldn't break faith with Maggie so he caught the "Box Car" Limited and went West.

In the little town of Sawbuck he found a big house with an open window and in the window shone a light. Jim went in and found a safe. While trying the tumblers the cop saw Jim at work. He stepped into the room and trod on the burglar-alarm which Jim had stepped over. That brought Colonel Anderson, the Sawbuck banker, downstairs and he explained to the cop that the window had been left open for his son's return.

Jim was amazed and the Colonel explained that he had driven his own son out of the house — regretted it ever since — and had left the window open and the light shining each night to bring his Tom home. As Tom didn't come, the Colonel meant to give Jim a chance. He was quick at figures and the Colonel took him into the bank and gave him a home in the big house, where he met Mary, the Colonel's ward. Jim and Mary were fast friends and — nothing more, because Mary told Jim all about Tom and how she loved him.

One night when Jim was at the bank, Tom Anderson did come back. He went to the bank, broke in through a window and "souped" the vault. Jim found him at work. The explosion of the vault as the door blew out put Tom off his guard for a moment and Jim got his gun from him and held him up. Then he recognized Tom from his photograph and told him that this would surely kill the Colonel. Tom broke down and wished he could go back, but there was the wrecked vault to account for. Jim told Tom to go home "straight." Jim would attend to the vault. So Tom went home and found the open window and the light shining. Jim stayed in the bank and saw the best chance in the world to get rich quick staring him in the face, but he remembered the Colonel's square deal and his own promise to Maggie and he didn't take as much as a dollar bill. He just left and started hoboing back East to Maggie. And the job in the bank was put down to Jim's account.

— Philip Hubbard, story and scenario

== Cast ==
- Hoot Gibson as Jim Hardy
- Virginia Brown Faire as Mary
- Ted Brooks as Tom Anderson
- L. M. Wells as Colonel Anderson
- C.E. Anderson credited as Captain Charles E. Anderson as Spider
- Rhea Haines as Maggie

== See also ==
- Hoot Gibson filmography
