= The Trail of the Hound =

1920 film

- Directed by: Albert Russell
- Written by: Ford Beebe
- Starring: Hoot Gibson
- Release date: December 25, 1920
- Running time: 20 minutes
- Country: United States
- Languages: Silent; English intertitles

The Trail of the Hound is a 1920 American short silent Western film directed by Albert Russell and featuring Hoot Gibson.

== Plot ==
This plot summary comes from the original Library of Congress filing for the copyright:

Bob Lane and Slim Rodgers are in love with the boss's daughter, Alice. Alice plays no favorites but Bob wins first place by beating Slim for the mail. Alice is elated over her letter, for her uncle is sending her an angora poodle. They are all very happy when her father enters to learn the cause of the merriment. On hearing the news he looks very forlorn, as pups are not to his liking. Alice informs Bob that he is to drive her to the city for the dog. As they leave her father tells Slim that he will give him money for an engagement ring if he will make away with the pup before it reaches the farm. He follows the two to town and as Alice is doing a little shopping, Bob steps into the meat market leaving the pup alone. Hungry Higgins, a town bum spies the pup and steals it. Slim watching from a distance, tells Alice and Bob on their return that the pup jumped from the buggy and was killed by freight. They are heartbroken and Alice blames Bob for leaving the pup alone. She then asks Slim to take her home. In the meantime the tramp has purchased some hair dye and has dyed the pup black. He then approaches Bob, who is sitting very dejected and offers the pup for sale. Bob thinking that he might be able to make it up with Alice buys the dog.

Todd, one of their neighbors, is sorrowing over the loss of his dog, Tillie. He is telling Alice's father of his loss, just as Bob presents Alice with the pup; she, thinking it is Todd's dog, refuses it — Bob is taken back, but has no chance to escape and hides the dog in his hat just as Alice's father and Todd come out. Bob beats it to the bunk house and is followed by Todd and Alice's father. They accuse Bob of stealing the dog and Bob brings forth the pup only to find it is not Todd's. Alice's father then tells him Alice can have the dog, and to bring her down there for it. While he is gone he again bribes Slim to make away with the dog. Bob and Alice return to find the dog gone. They see Slim making his getaway and they follow. Bob overtakes him at the bank of a small stream and a terrific battle ensues, the pup being dropped into the water.

Alice and her father drive up just as Bob knocks Slim out. He then makes for the pup who is unable to get out of the water only to find that it has washed white. This delights Alice who forgives Bob for the past and taking the buggy they start for home, leaving the impression that it will be a very happy ending.

— Ford Beebe, story and scenario

== Cast ==
- Hoot Gibson as Bob Lane
- Jim Corey as Slim Dodgers
- Charles Newton as Chub Gray
- Ben Corbett as Hungry Higgins
- W.S. Weatherwax as Simon Todd
- Dorothy Wood as Alice Gray

== See also ==
- Hoot Gibson filmography
