= The Driftin' Kid (1921 film) =

1921 film

- Directed by: Albert Russell
- Written by: Ford Beebe; J. Edward Hungerford
- Starring: Hoot Gibson
- Release date: January 8, 1921
- Running time: 20 minutes
- Country: United States
- Languages: Silent; English intertitles

The Driftin' Kid is a 1921 American short silent Western film directed by Albert Russell and featuring Hoot Gibson.

== Plot ==
The Driftin' Kid was "a story of love and adventure" set "entirely in the West". A ranch hand falls in love with the boss's daughter. He also delivers a letter to a rancher; upsetting hews in that letter leads to a fatal shooting.

== Cast ==
- Hoot Gibson
- Artie Ortego credited as Art Ortego
- Gertrude Olmstead
- Lulu Jenks credited as Lule B. Jenks
- Jim Corey
- Otto Nelson

== See also ==
- List of American films of 1921
