= Paul Cazeneuve =

French politician

Paul Cazeneuve (10 January 1852, Lyon - 30 March 1934 Paris) was a French politician. He belonged to the Radical Party. He was a member of the Chamber of Deputies from 1902 to 1909 and a Senator from 1909 to 1920.
