= Albert Russell (director) =

American filmmaker and actor (1890–1929)

- Born: Albert E. Lerche; August 2, 1890; New York, New York, U.S.
- Died: March 4, 1929 (aged 38); Los Angeles, California, U.S.
- Occupation(s): Director, screenwriter, actor
- Years active: 1912–1923
- Spouse: Vola Vale (m.1918–div.1926)
- Children: 1
- Relatives: William Russell

Albert Russell (Born Albert E. Lerche; August 2, 1890 – March 4, 1929) was an American director, screenwriter and actor of the silent era. He directed 18 films between 1919 and 1923. He also wrote five screenplays between 1916 and 1921.

He was born in New York, New York, and died from pneumonia in Los Angeles, California. His brother was actor William Russell, who died two weeks earlier from pneumonia.

== Filmography ==
- Baseball Madness (1917)
- The Lion Man (1919)
- The Moon Riders (1920 – story)
- 'In Wrong' Wright (1920)
- Double Danger (1920)
- Tipped Off (1920)
- Fight It Out (1920)
- The Trail of the Hound (1920)
- The Driftin' Kid (1921)
- Kickaroo (1921)
- No Monkey Business (1921) (as Al Russell)
- The White Horseman (1921)
- The Secret Four (1921)
- The Room of Death (1921) (as Al Russell)
- Matching Wits (1922)
- Trickery (1922) (as Al Russell)
- The Call of Courage (1922) (as Al Russell)
- A Treacherous Rival (1922) (as Al Russell)
- The Verdict (1922) (as Al Russell)
- Lone Fighter (1923)
