= Double Danger (1920 film) =

1920 film

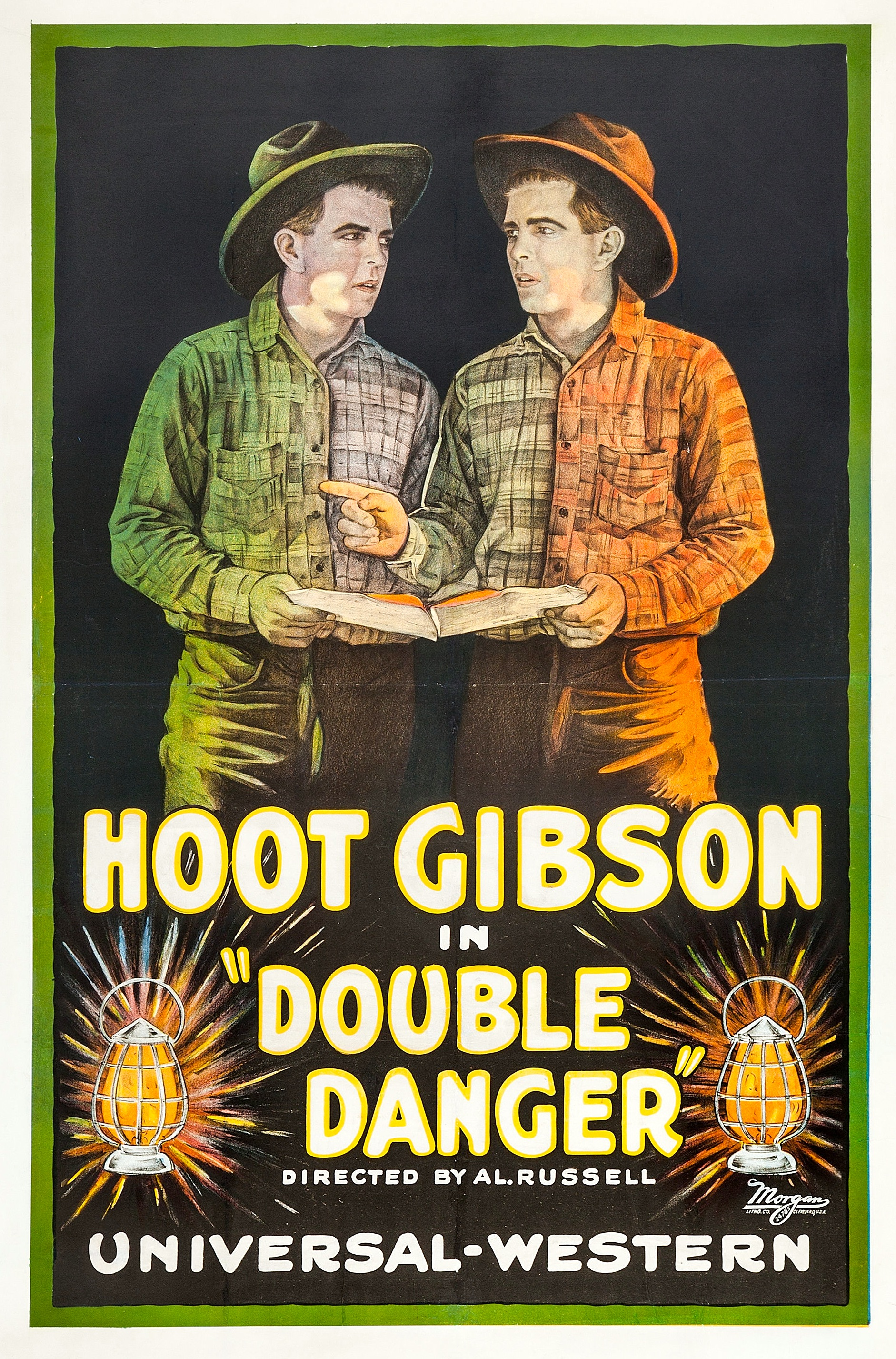
- Poster for the film
- Directed by: Albert Russell
- Written by: Ford Beebe
- Starring: Hoot Gibson
- Production company: Universal Film Manufacturing Company
- Distributed by: Universal Film Manufacturing Company
- Release date: November 13, 1920
- Running time: 20 minutes
- Country: United States
- Languages: Silent; English intertitles

Double Danger is a 1920 American short silent Western film directed by Albert Russell and featuring Hoot Gibson.

== Plot ==
According to a film magazine, "Jim and Jerry Marvin were twins, whose resemblance was so remarkable that when folks owed Jim money they would be likely to pay it to Jerry, who would then give it to Jim and explain. But as years rolled on, Jim and Jerry separated. Jerry secured a position as foreman on the Circle-Bar ranch, while Jim wandered about simlessly [sic] from one job to another.

An old fire-eater was Dawson, Jerry's boss — but that did not deter his daughter, Peggy, from issuing instructions and seeing that they were carried out by her dad as well as the foreman, even though she was in love with Jerry.

"Bull" Condon, Dawson's neighboring rancher was in love with Peggy, but the feeling was not mutual and when he arrived at the ranch to see Dawson relative to meeting the note which he held on the farm, he suggested to Dawson that if Peggy said the word, the note could take care of itself. But Dawson showed his true spirit by ordering Condon oif the ranch, saying that he would have the money that afternoon to liquidate the obligation.

Jerry goes to the bank to secure the money for Dawson and Condon follows with the intention of holding him up on his way back and securing the money. Jim, who wanders into this part of the country, unaware that his brother Jerry is in the vicinity, is mistaken for Jerry by Condon and knocked unconscious. Condon searches him for the money, but is unsuccessful. Jim's horse races away to Dawson's ranch and when Peggy and Dawson see the riderless horse, they start out on a hunt for Jerry, thinking he has been hurt. They find Jim and mistake him for Jerry. Peggy's sister administers aid and Jim starts making love to her, she thinking it is Jerry. Peggy enters just as Jim is embracing her sister and give Jim back the engagement ring, thinking Jim is Jerry. Jim is astonished, but takes it and hands it to Peggy's sister. Dawson questions Jim about the money and the note and he protests his innocence.

Later, however, in an effort to finally outwit Condon, the both brothers, the two girls and the father are all brought together They do put it over finally on Condon, and then Jerry turns to Peggy and Jim turns to Mary and Dawson turns to the four of them and peace seems to have settled at last."

== Cast ==
- Hoot Gibson as Jim Marvin/Jerry Marvin
- Dorothy Wood as Peggy Dawson
- Georgia Davey as Mary Dawson
- Charles Newton as Mr. Dawson
- Jim Corey as "Bull" Condon

== See also ==
- List of American films of 1920
