= The Stranger (1920 film) =

1920 film

- Written by: W. C. Tuttle
- Starring: Hoot Gibson
- Release date: December 4, 1920
- Running time: 20 minutes
- Country: United States
- Languages: Silent; English intertitles

The Stranger is a 1920 American short silent Western film featuring Hoot Gibson.

== Cast ==
- Hoot Gibson
- Dorothy Woods
