= Tipped Off (1920 film) =

1920 film

- Directed by: Albert Russell
- Written by: Ford Beebe
- Starring: Hoot Gibson
- Production company: Universal Film Manufacturing Company
- Distributed by: Universal Film Manufacturing Company
- Release date: November 27, 1920
- Running time: 20 minutes
- Country: United States
- Languages: Silent; English intertitles

Tipped Off is a 1920 American short silent Western film directed by Albert Russell and featuring Hoot Gibson.

== Plot ==
This plot summary comes from the original copyright registration at the Library of Congress:

"Hundred Proof" Ross, a prohibition sufferer, fires his foreman, Billy Steele, for making love to his daughter, Marion. Ross leaves for town to receive a mysterious package and Billy and Marion decide to elope. They drive to town, intending to catch the first train.

Ross secures his express package and invites two friends to an alleyway for a drink. The town marshall starts to investigate and Ross saunters down the street with the officer in pursuit.

At the station Billy leaves Marion with the grips while he secures the tickets. Marion sees her father coming, and wishing to evade him steps outside leaving the grips unguarded. Ross looks in vain for a place to hide his bottle, spies the grip and slips in the bottle, intending to rescue it after he has placated the marshall.

Discovering that the next train is not due for several hours, Billy sends Marion to the hotel to secure a room. He walks by Ross and the marshall, carrying the grips, his former employer being unable to stop him on account of the officer's presence. Ross is released when no liquor is found on his person, and he follows Billy to the hotel, trying to explain about the contents of the grip. Billy knows nothing of the bottle and refuses to talk to the man who had fired him.

In the meanwhile an escaped convict, in need of a change of clothes, waylays a circuit-riding preacher and forces him to trade. He also takes the preacher's horse and rides into town. The marshall has been notified to be on the lookout for the escaped convict and has a posse gathered. The convict scents trouble and, looking for a safe place to hide, finds his way to a hotel room adjoining Marion's quarters.

Ross, still on the trail of the bottle, enters the room occupied by Marion, where he saw Billy deposit the grips. Marion hides in the closet and is not discovered by her father. When Billy returns and learns of Ross's visit, he thinks he is being pursued by the father on account of a mistaken impression of his intentions towards Marion. He decides to find a minister at once to perform the marriage ceremony. In the hall he discovers the convict, who is trying to escape as soon as the posse has passed, and believing him to be a minister, Billy insists that he accompany him to the adjoining room and tie the knot.

Many laughable complications occur before the situation is finally cleared up, the convict recaptured, the real minister rescued from his embarrassing position and Billy and Marion married with her father's blessings.

— Ford Beebe, story and scenario

== Cast ==
- Hoot Gibson as Billy Steele
- Gertrude Olmstead as Marion Ross
- Jim Corey as John Carnes
- Charles Newton as "Hundred Proof" Ross
- Jack Walters as the Rev. Sommers
