= Libin =

Libin may refer to:

== People ==
- Alvin Libin (born 1931), Canadian businessman and philanthropist
- Liu Libin (born 1995), Chinese volleyball player
- Phil Libin (born 1972), Russian entrepreneur
- Wang Libin (born 1963), Chinese basketball player
- Xiang Libin (born 1967), Chinese researcher
- Zalmon Libin (1872-1955), American playwright
- Zhang Libin (born 1955), Chinese roboticist

== Places ==
- Libín, Czech Republic
- Libin, Belgium, Walloon municipality located in the province of Luxembourg

== Other ==
- Libin Cardiovascular Institute of Alberta, Canada
