= Sky Ranger =

Sky Ranger or Skyranger can refer to:

- The Sky Ranger (1921 film), an American 15-episode/chapter silent film serial
- The Sky Ranger (1928 film), an American silent short film
- Skyranger 30, VSHORAD
- Skyranger 35, VSHORAD
- Best Off Skyranger, very light aircraft type, 1990-2020s era
- Commonwealth Skyranger (originally the Rearwin Skyranger), light aircraft type, 1940s-era
- Space Sheriff Gavan, the Japanese TV series aired in the Philippines as Sky Ranger Gabin
