= James W. Morrison =

American actor

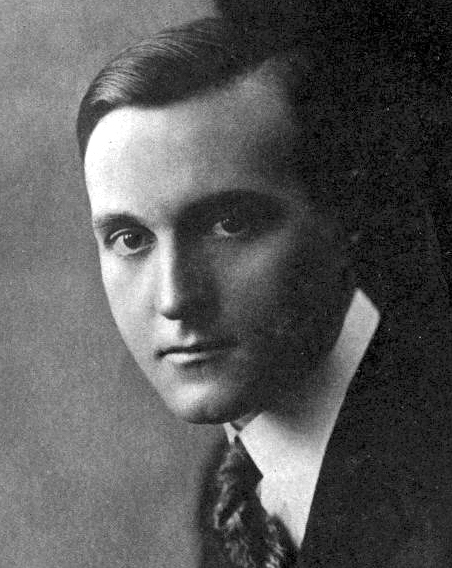
- Morrison in 1921
- Born: James Woods Morrison; November 15, 1888; Mattoon, Illinois, U.S.
- Died: November 15, 1974 (aged 86); New York, New York, U.S.
- Occupations: film actor, author
- Years active: 1911–1927

James W. Morrison (November 15, 1888 – November 15, 1974) was an American actor and author. He appeared in 187 films between 1911 and 1927.

== Biography ==
Morrison was born in Mattoon, Illinois, United States, on November 15, 1888. He went to the University of Chicago and then the American Academy of Dramatic Arts in New York City. Vitagraph Studios then hired him for a salary of $25 a week, and he debuted in a 30-minute film of A Tale of Two Cities released by Vitagraph in February 1911. Morrison was one of the primary actors of Vitagraph from 1911 to 1916.

In 1916, Morrison signed a contract with Ivan Abramson's Ivan Film Productions, appearing in seven Ivan melodramas from 1916 and 1918, starting with 1916's The Sex Lure. Enlighten Thy Daughter (1917) was the most popular of these films. In 1918, Morrison appeared in Vitagraph's Over the Top, which Morrison later said was one of his favorite films. Morrison continued to play roles into the 1920s, last acting in 1926.

He later published two novels, Road End (1927) and April Luck (1932). He taught speech and drama classes at Packer Collegiate Institute in Brooklyn for many years.

Morrison died in New York, New York on November 15, 1974, 86 years to the day of his birth.

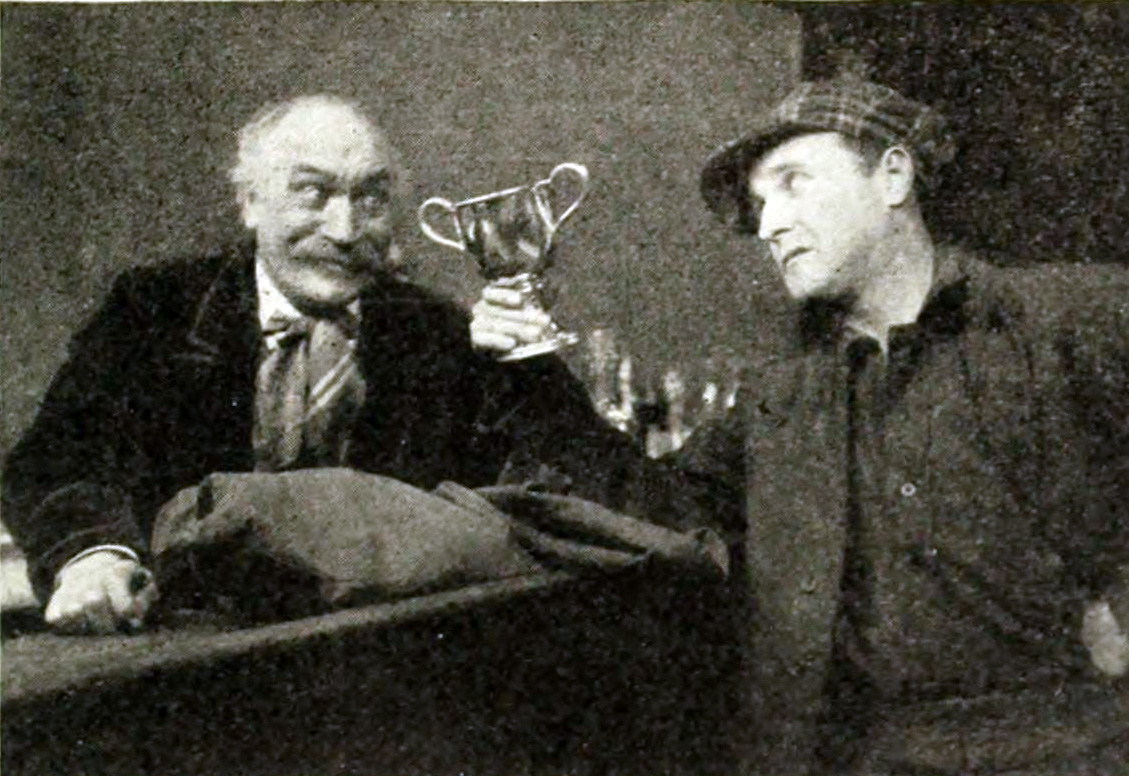
The Redemption of Dave Darcey (1916)

== Partial filmography ==
- A Tale of Two Cities (1911)
- A Cure for Pokeritis (1912)
- As You Like It (1912)
- Beau Brummel (1913)
- The Battle Cry of Peace (1915)
- The Wheels of Justice (1915)
- The Sex Lure (1916)
- The Enemy (1916)
- Enlighten Thy Daughter (1917)
- One Law for Both (1917)
- Sins of Ambition (1917)
- Over the Top (1918)
- How Could You, Caroline? (1918)
- The Woman Game (1920)
- Black Beauty (1921)
- Sowing the Wind (1921)
- A Yankee Go Getter (1921)
- Danger Ahead (1921)
- Shattered Idols (1922)
- Handle with Care (1922)
- The Little Minister (1922)
- Only a Shop Girl (1922)
- The Dangerous Age (1923)
- The Little Girl Next Door (1923)
- The Nth Commandment (1923)
- The Man Next Door (1923)
- On the Banks of the Wabash (1923)
- Captain Blood (1924)
- Wreckage (1925)
- The Pride of the Force (1925)
- The Impostor (1926)
