= Pearl Shepard =

American actress

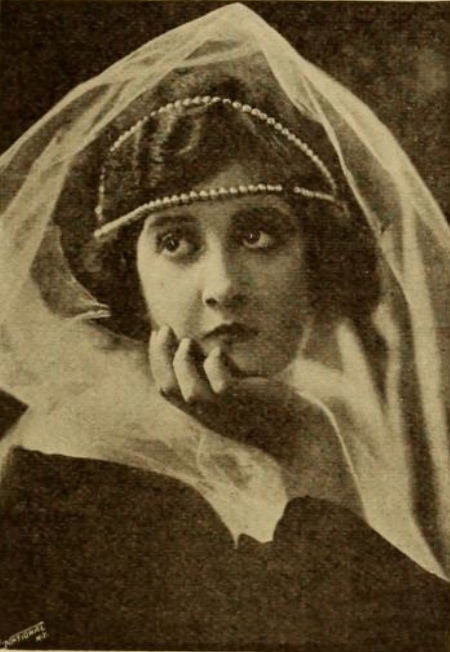
- Pearl Shepard, from a 1919 publication
- Born: Pearl Ginsberg; January 17, 1900; New York, New York, U.S.
- Died: September 8, 1993 (aged 93); Oceanside, California, U.S.
- Other name: Pearl Ginsburg
- Occupation: Actress

Pearl Shepard (January 17, 1900 – September 8, 1993), born Pearl Ginsberg, was an American actress in silent films. Her relationship with an Egyptian prince was in the headlines in 1924 and 1925.

== Biography ==
Shepard was from New York City, the daughter of Morris (or Maurice) Ginsberg and Essie Ginsberg. Her father was a furrier, born in Russia.

Shepard, known for her auburn hair, won a beauty contest at Madison Square Garden, and gained a film contract from the Thanhouser Company. Florence La Badie was her mentor at Thanhouser. She appeared in more than a dozen short silent films and several longer films, between 1917 and 1922, often comedies directed by Frank P. Donovan.

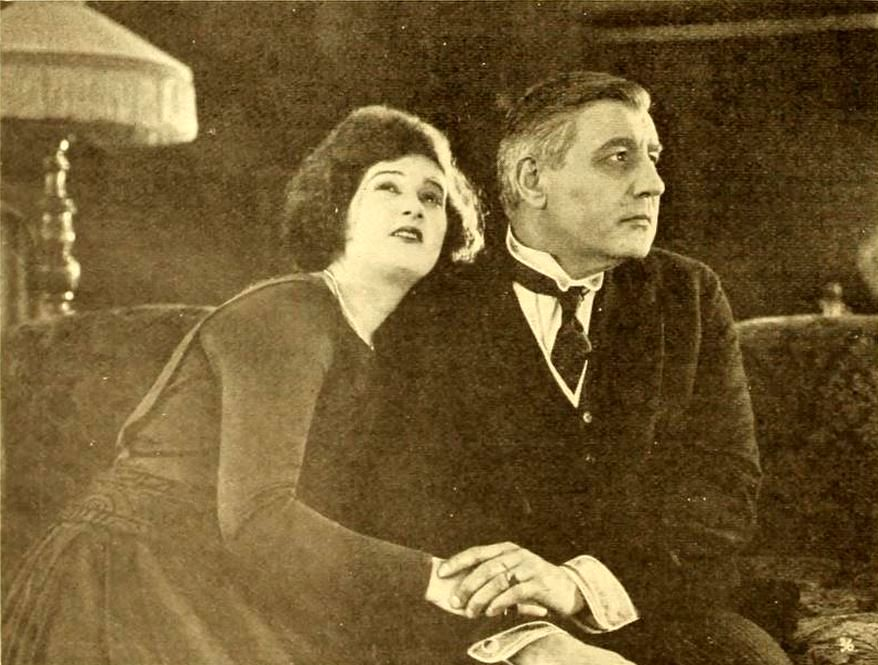
Pearl Shepard and Charles Richman in a still from The Echo of Youth (1919), directed by Ivan Abramson

In 1924, Shepard's family announced that she had married Egyptian prince Mohammed Ali Ibrahim in 1923. He was described as a "sporting prince", and had previously been linked to actresses Mabel Withee and Mabel Normand. She was rumored to be back in New York City without him in 1925. In 1935, she was still hoping to marry him, though he was linked with other actresses in the 1930s. She lived with her sister in Rye, New York, in the 1950s.

== Filmography ==
- The New Butler (1916, short, with Jerold T. Hevener)
- A Harem Romance (1917, short)
- His Winning Ways (1917, short)
- Stealing a Sweetheart (1917, short)
- A Boarding House Battle (1917, short)
- A Hash House Romance (1917, short)
- The Echo of Youth (1919)
- Break the News to Mother (1919)
- Bullin' the Bullsheviki (1919)
- Why Leave Your Husband? (1920)
- His Valet (1921, short)
- The Price of Possession (1921)
- Mother Eternal (1921)
- The Wages of Sin (1922)
- Go Get 'Em Hutch (1922)
- Between Two Husbands (1922)
