= Ashes of Love =

Ashes of Love may refer to:

- Ashes of Love (film), a 1918 American silent drama film
- Ashes of Love (TV series), a 2018 Chinese television series
