= Sins of the Parents =

Sins of the Parents may refer to:

- Sins of the Parents (1914 film), an American silent film
- Sins of the Parents (1919 film), a German silent film
- Sins of the Parents, a 2008 film featuring Maurice Kirya
