= Paula Shay =

American actress

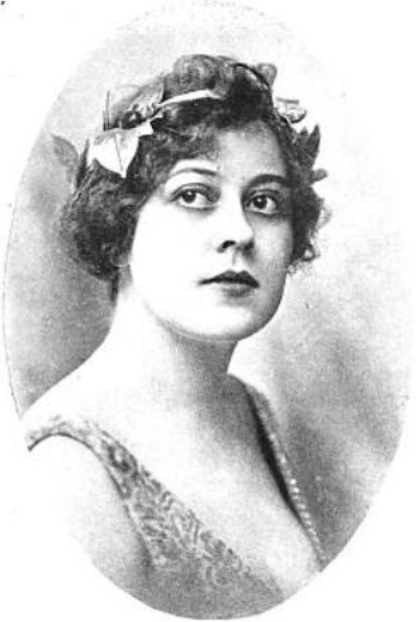
- Paula Shay, from a 1917 publication
- Born: April 22, 1893; Toledo, Ohio, U.S.
- Died: October 14, 1972 (age 79); Scottsdale, Arizona, U.S.
- Other names: Paula Shay Sleicher, Paula Shay Davis, Paula Crawford
- Occupations: Actress, writer, artist

Paula Shay (April 22, 1893 – October 14, 1972), also known as Paula Sleicher, Paula Shay Davis, and Paula T. Crawford, was an American actress, writer and artist. She appeared on stage and in silent film in the 1910s and 1920s. Later she wrote poetry, plays, and instructional texts, and was known as a local artist in Florida.

== Early life and education ==
Shay was born in Toledo, Ohio, the daughter of William D. Shay and Jessie Shay.

== Career ==
Shay appeared in silent films between 1915 and 1922, including the melodramas Forbidden Fruit (1915) and The Immortal Flame (1916), both directed by Ivan Abramson. Her Broadway credits included roles in The Whirlwind (1919–1920), Toto (1921), The Teaser (1921), and Whitewashed (1924). She also starred in a touring production of Everywoman in 1917 and 1918, produced by Henry W. Savage. In 1923 she starred in Lawful Larceny in summer stock.

Shay joined the Red Cross during World War I, saying "We stage folk want to do our bit for our country, even though we are regarded as gay and light and flippant; we have our serious moods just as everyday people have; it isn't all greasepaint and makeup, and there are very few of us who haven't been touched by the war." Shay was invited to participate in an Actors' Equity Association exhibition of art by actors in 1923, in New York City.

In the 1930s and 1940s Shay taught art and acting. The Strait Museum in Florida exhibited art by Paula Shay Davis the 1950s. She was an active member of the Lake Worth Art League, into the 1960s.

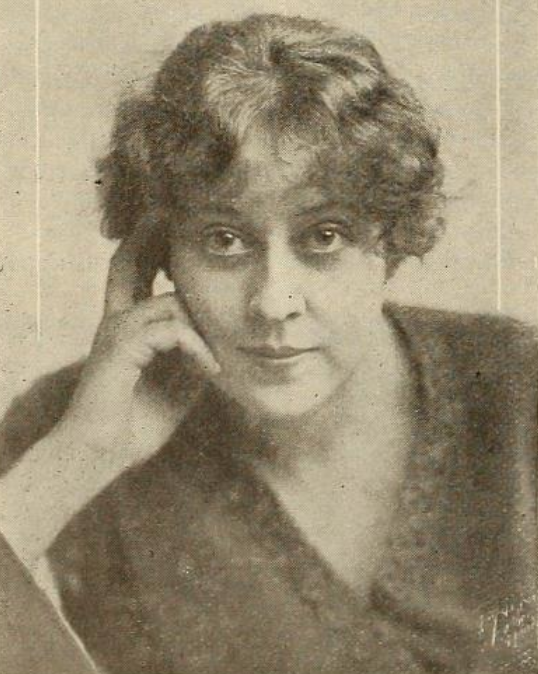
Paula Shay, from a 1916 publication

== Filmography ==
- Forbidden Fruit (1915)
- A Fool's Paradise (1916)
- The Immortal Flame (1916)
- The City of Illusion (1916)
- Fresh Air (1917)
- Ashes of Love (1918)
- The Spirit of Lafayette (1919)
- The Black Panther's Cub (1921)
- A Stage Romance (1922)

== Writings ==
- "November" (1937, poem, American Poetry Magazine)
- The Last Proposal (1937, one-act play)
- Radiant Memory (1937, one-act play)
- Lightning Strikes Twice (1943, play, with Margaret F. Bower)
- Individualized Lessons on the Fundamentals of Good American Speech (1947)
- "Painting for Pleasure" (1964, The Palm Beach Post)

== Personal life ==
Shay married industrial engineer Ralph H. Sleicher in the 1930s. He died in 1950. She married Joseph Davis in October 1951. Her third husband was writer Merwin R. Crawford; he survived her when she died in 1972, in Scottsdale, Arizona, at the age of 79.
