= The Echo of Youth =

1919 film by Ivan Abramson

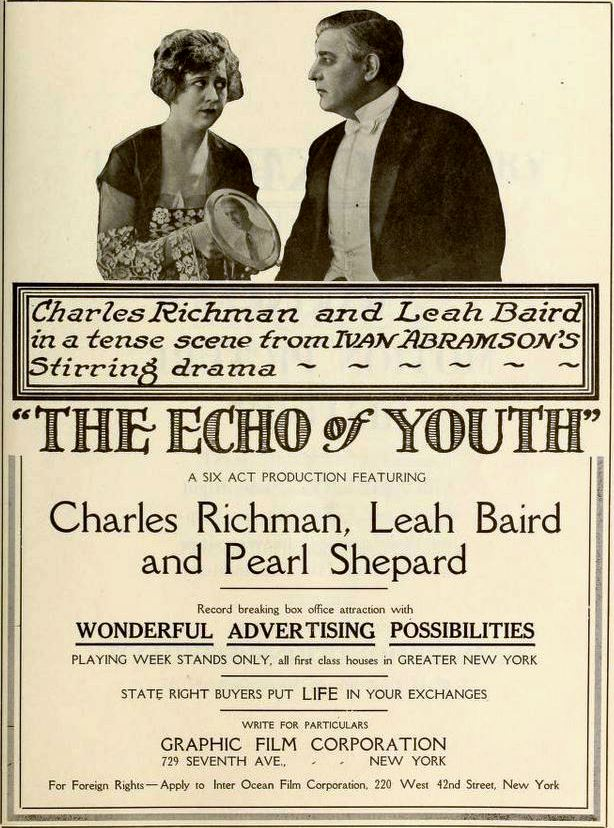
- Ad for film
- Directed by: Ivan Abramson
- Written by: Ivan Abramson
- Produced by: Graphic Film Corporation
- Release date: February 1919
- Running time: 6 reels
- Country: United States
- Language: Silent (English intertitles)

The Echo of Youth is a lost 1919 American silent drama film written and directed by Ivan Abramson, and featuring Charles Richman, Leah Baird, Pearl Shepard, and Marie Shotwell.

== Plot ==
Cabaret singer Olive Martin (played by Baird) approaches her former lover Peter Graham (Richman), just recently elevated to the Supreme Court, about the fact that he is the father of her out-of-wedlock son. To avoid exposing this scandal, Olive demands that Peter divorce his wife (played by Shotwell) and marry her. Meanwhile, the alleged son, Harold (played by Jack McLean) is falling in love in Boston with Anita (Pearl Shepherd)—who is Peter's daughter with his wife. News of their engagement and impending incestuous marriage requires Peter to divulge what he knows and forbid the marriage. In typical Abramson fashion, however, it is revealed that Olive has lied about Harold being her son—instead he is the son of Olive's brother-in-law merely being used by Olive for blackmail! Peter's plan to commit suicide is successfully stopped, and the wedding free to proceed.

== Cast ==
- Charles Richman as Peter Graham
- Leah Baird as Olive Martin
- Pearl Shepard as Anita Graham
- Jack McLean as Harold Martin
- William Bechtel as Thomas Donald
- Marie Shotwell as Ruth Carlyle Graham
- Howard Hall as John Carlyle
- Peggy Shanor as Marian Ducet
- Philip Van Loan as Marcel Ducet

== Background ==
Released in February 1919, the film was the last picture Abramson directed for Graphic Film Corporation while it was a joint venture with William Randolph Hearst. The reviews for the movie were negative, aside from those issued by Hearst's papers. The Chicago Tribune, for example, called it "awful" and the "worst picture on the docket."
