= The Little Girl Next Door (1923 film) =

1923 silent film

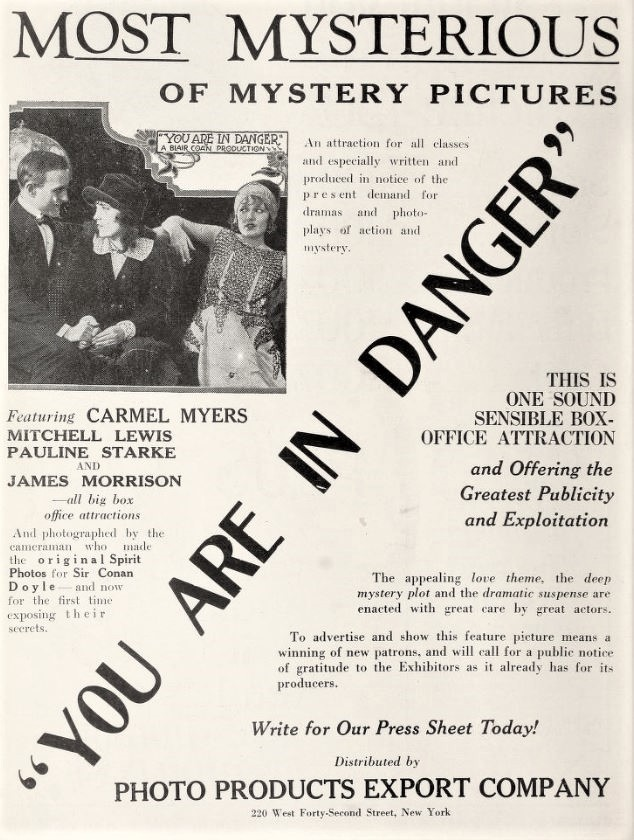
- Advertisement using the alternative title
- Directed by: W.S. Van Dyke
- Written by: Louis Weadock
- Starring: Pauline Starke; James Morrison; Carmel Myers
- Cinematography: André Barlatier
- Production company: Blair Coan Productions
- Release date: April 28, 1923
- Running time: 60 minutes
- Country: United States
- Languages: Silent; English intertitles

The Little Girl Next Door is a 1923 American silent drama film directed by W.S. Van Dyke and starring Pauline Starke, James Morrison, and Carmel Myers. It was also released under the alternative title You Are in Danger.

== Plot ==
As described by a Chicago Tribune reviewer, the film tells the tale of "an ingenuous young man from the country falls into the clutches of a city dope ring, and is finally rescued by a maiden, pure, but made wise by sad experience". This reviewer viewed the film as a remake of the 1916 film of the same name.

== Cast ==
- Pauline Starke as Mary Slocum
- James Morrison as Jim Manning
- Carmel Myers as Milly Amory
- Mitchell Lewis as Tug Wilson
- Edgar Kennedy as Hank Hall

== Bibliography ==
- Connelly, Robert B. The Silents: Silent Feature Films, 1910-36, Volume 40, Issue 2. December Press, 1998.
