= Sins of Ambition =

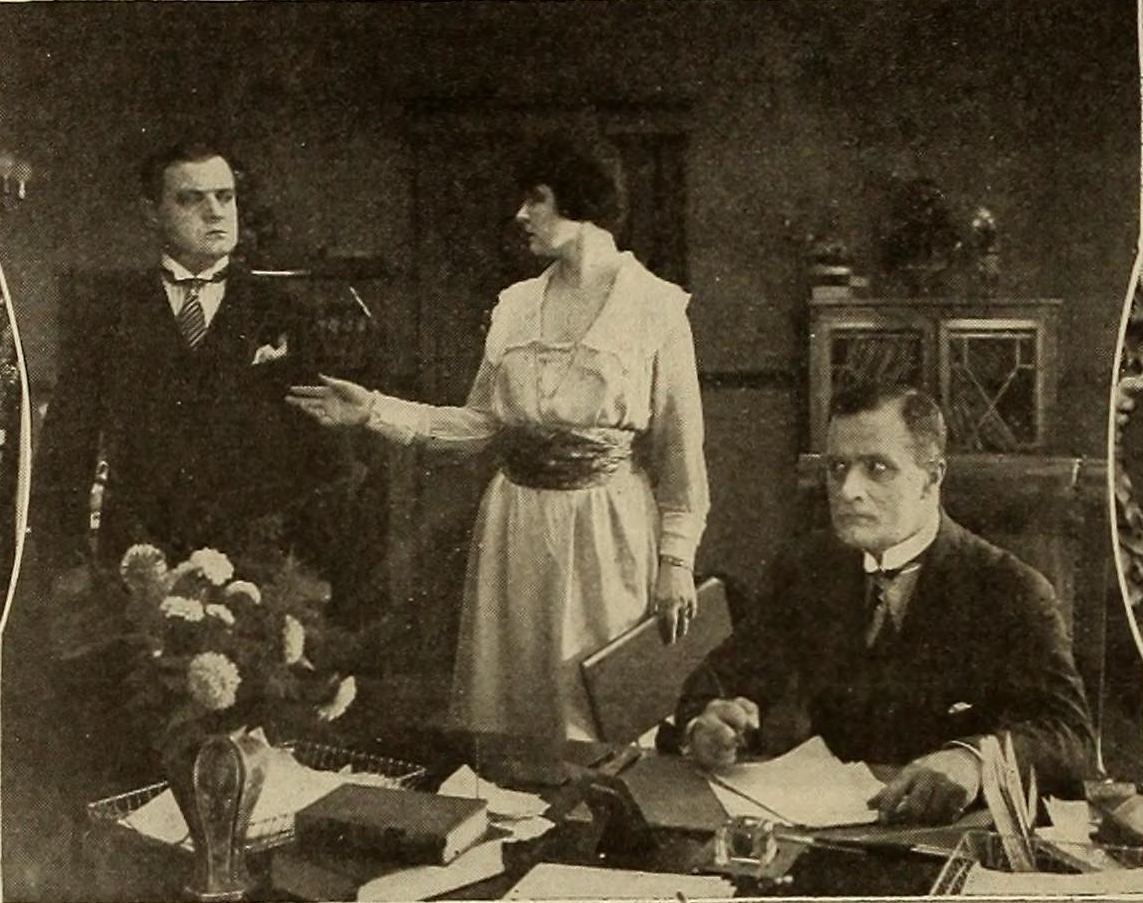
- Directed by: Ivan Abramson
- Written by: Ivan Abramson
- Starring: James W. Morrison; Wilfred Lucas; Anders Randolf; Leah Baird; Barbara Castleton
- Cinematography: Marcel Le Picard
- Music by: George W. Beynon
- Production company: Ivan Film Productions
- Release date: December 19, 1917
- Running time: 78 minutes (6-7 reels)
- Country: United States
- Languages: Silent; English intertitles

Sins of Ambition is a 1917 American silent drama film directed and written by Ivan Abramson, and starring James W. Morrison, Wilfred Lucas, Anders Randolf, and Leah Baird. The film was produced by Ivan Film Productions and released on a states rights basis.

== Plot ==
The linguist Andrew Maxwell has spent nineteen years of his married life perfecting a universal language, which he hopes will spawn world peace. He asks his wife Laurette, a former actress, to contact her former admirer, Prescott, to extend the mortgage on their estate. Laurette, frustrated by her husband's neglect of her and her daughter, and their impoverished state, tells Prescott of their current situation. His dormant love for her is awakened, and he encourages her to perform again.

At a fundraising garden party, Laurette stars as Lady Macbeth and enjoys the applause so much, she wants to return to the stage. Prescott proposes that she divorce Maxwell and marry him instead, promising to make her a star, which she accepts. As he embraces her, Maxwell discovers them and refuses her request for a divorce, believing it will bring shame to their daughter, Ruth. In order for him to grant the divorce, Laurette tells him that Ruth is not his biological child and Maxwell strikes her to the floor. He consents to the divorce.

Laurette and Ruth move apart from Maxwell, and Ruth is determined find the cause of the divorce. She goes to Maxwell herself to inquire the reason, but his pride prevents him from speaking to her. When she tearfully asks how he could treat his own daughter so cruelly, he responds that he has no children and leaves. She returns home to find her mother preparing, with Prescott, to return to the stage, and her plan to marry him. Resenting the unhappiness of her father, Ruth sets a trap where she seduces Prescott away from her mother, and convinces Laurette and her own fiancee, Franklin, that they are in love. Franklin pulls a revolver and Prescott is killed in the struggle.

Calling Maxwell in desperation, Laurette confesses that she lied about Ruth being another man's daughter, and he rushes to their aid. That evening, Laurette was expected to appear before a massive theater audience, and her manager, panicking, arrives at her home to convince her to perform, at least once. Laurette refuses, seeing her ambition as unrighteous. Ruth is arrested on the charge of murder, but is acquitted, leaving the family to finally reunite.

== Cast ==
- James W. Morrison as Franklin Church
- Wilfred Lucas as Andrew Maxwell
- Anders Randolf as Charles Prescott
- Leah Baird as Laurette Maxwell
- Barbara Castleton as Ruth Maxwell
- Edmund Lawrence as Jay Church
- Madlaine Traverse as Violet

== Reception ==
Exhibitor's Herald gave the film a positive review, despite finding the story to be "melodramatic in the extreme." The reviewer praised the performances of the cast, enjoyed the "lavish settings," and the novel photography.

Motion Picture News reviewer Joseph L. Kelley called the picture "average," though described the action later in the picture as "forges ahead with a strength of purpose that impresses."

Moving Picture World reviewer Edward Weitzel was mostly positive, but felt that the story was "overburdened" with too many motives compelling the action forward. He also critiqued Barbara Castleton for her overacting.

Wid's Filmdom's review was negative, saying of the direction "It was astounding to see how bad some of these people who have done such good work before can be." The reviewer extensively criticized the lighting during close ups, the cinematography, and the tinting, as poor. They also criticized the story as being a "jumbled affair" and the intertitles for containing "dozens of speeches that no human being would ever make," and "particularly bad." The only praise in the review was saved for Madlaine Traverse, who "carried her scenes more humanly than did any of the other members of the cast."

== Censorship ==
The Kansas Board of Review required three intertitles to be removed before Sins of Ambition could be exhibited in the state. The eliminations were an intertitle in reel 3, saying "Don't worry about Ruth. Suppose I were to tell you she is not your child." Two intertitles were removed from reel 7, saying "Did Ruth kill her father?" and "She is your child." Similarly, the Chicago Board of Censors required the same intertitle from reel 3 to be removed, and "Did Ruth kill her father?" from reel 6. Additionally, the board removed "My thirst for fame and glory made me lie. Ruth is your own child; I swear it." from the same reel.

== Preservation ==
A print survives at the Library of Congress film archive.
