= The Child Thou Gavest Me =

1921 film directed by John M. Stahl

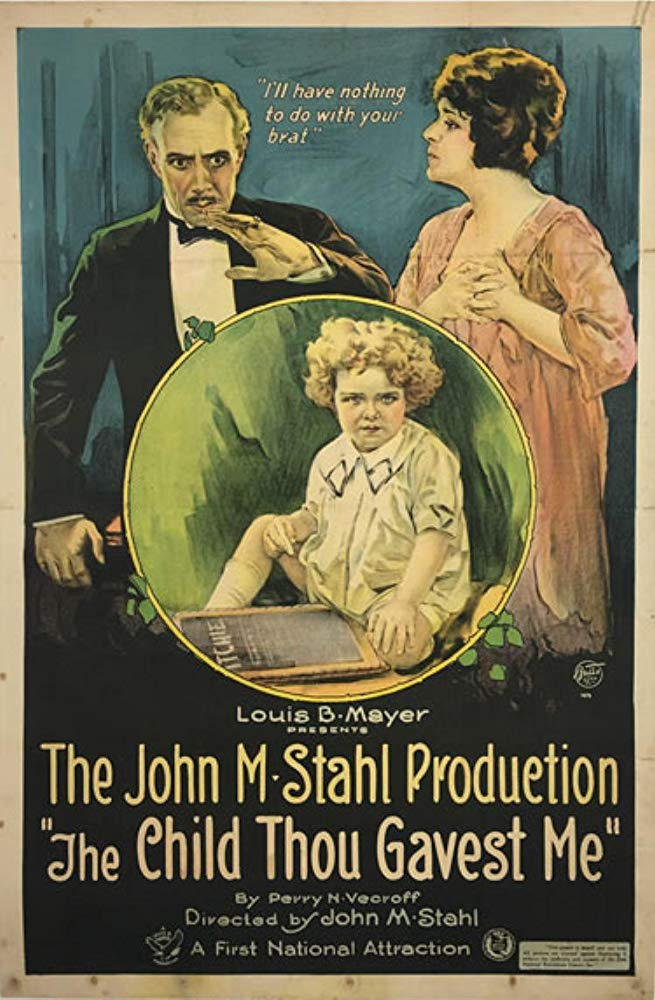
- Theatrical release poster
- Directed by: John M. Stahl
- Screenplay by: Chester L. Roberts
- Story by: Perry N. Vekroff
- Produced by: John M. Stahl
- Starring: Barbara Castleton; Adele Farrington; Winter Hall; Lewis Stone; William Desmond; Richard Headrick
- Cinematography: Ernest Palmer
- Edited by: Madge Tyrone
- Production company: John M. Stahl Productions
- Distributed by: Associated First National Pictures
- Release date: August 20, 1921
- Running time: 60 minutes
- Country: United States
- Language: Silent (English intertitles)

The Child Thou Gavest Me is a 1921 American silent drama film directed by John M. Stahl and written by Chester L. Roberts. The film stars Barbara Castleton, Adele Farrington, Winter Hall, Lewis Stone, William Desmond, and Richard Headrick. The film was released on August 20, 1921, by Associated First National Pictures.

== Plot ==
The film begins with a wedding. During the ceremony the bride's illegitimate child suddenly appears. The marriage is maintained on the outside, but within the couple the jealousy of the husband leads to strong conflicts.

== Cast ==
- Barbara Castleton as Norma Huntley
- Adele Farrington as Her Mother
- Winter Hall as Her Father
- Lewis Stone as Edward Berkeley
- William Desmond as Tom Marshall
- Richard Headrick as Bobby
- Mary Elizabeth Forbes as Governess

== Preservation ==
A nearly complete print of The Child Thou Gavest Me, 5,967 feet of its original 6,091 feet, is held by the Library of Congress. The print was screened at Pordenone Silent Film Festival in 2018.
