= One Law for Both =

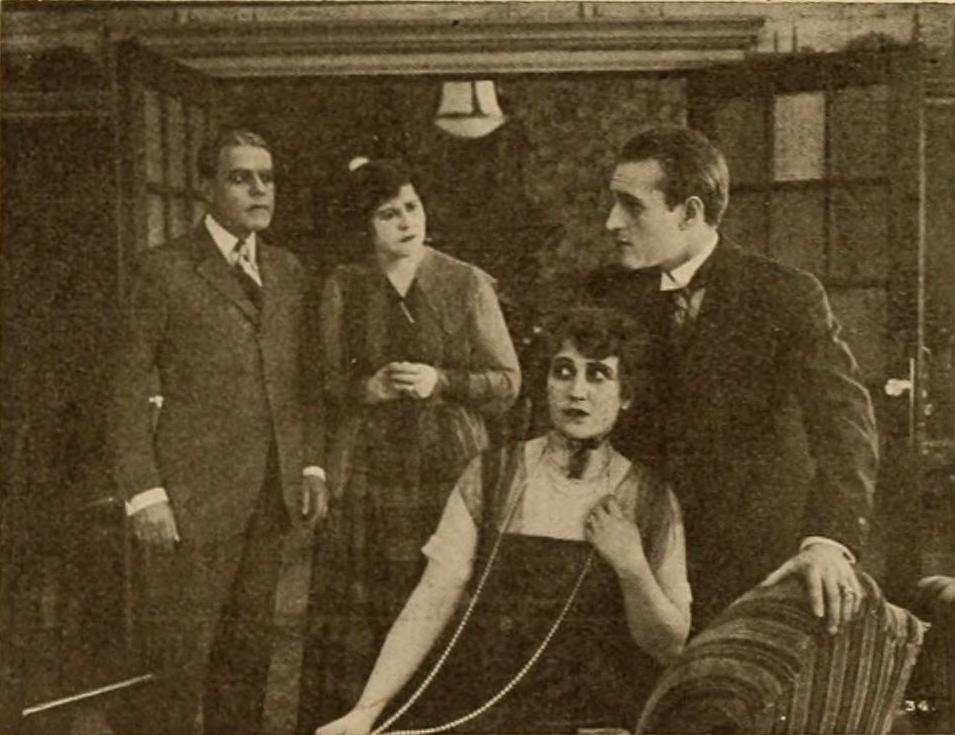
- Scene with (from left) Vincent Serrano, Leah Baird, Rita Jolivet, and James W. Morrison
- Directed by: Ivan Abramson
- Produced by: Ivan Film Productions
- Release date: May 19, 1917
- Running time: 80 minutes
- Country: United States
- Language: Silent (English intertitles)

One Law for Both is a 1917 American silent drama film directed by Ivan Abramson.

== Plot ==
Elga Pulsaki (Rita Jolivet) and her brother Ossip (James W. Morrison) emigrate to the United States from Russia to escape persecution. Elga marries Norman Hutchinson (Vincent Serrano), but their marital bliss is torn asunder when Norman learns that Elga had had sex with a government official in Russia who had threatened her brother. Norman throws Elga out of the house, but Norman's sister reminds him that he did not suggest the same course of action for her when she realized her husband (Count de Fernac, played by Pedro de Cordoba) had previously fathered a child out of wedlock. Struck by cognitive dissonance—the unequal treatment of the sexes—Norman apologizes to Elga and they are reunited.

== Cast ==
- Rita Jolivet at Elga Pulaski
- James W. Morrison as Ossip Pulaski
- Leah Baird as Helen
- Vincent Serrano as Norman Hutchinson
- Paul Capellani as Baron Jan Slezak
- Helen Arnold as Magda
- Pedro de Cordoba as Count de Fernac
- Margaret Greene as Renee
- Anders Randolf as The Governor, General Gourko
- Hassan Mussalli as Feodor Wolski
- Walter Gould as Henri

== Reception ==
One Law for Both was director Ivan Abramson's most involved production to that point in terms of expense, length, and cast, featuring a well-known cast of respected actors. The Moving Picture World found the finished product to be "far too long" with a "very slow and somewhat tedious" tempo, and with rapid unexplained jumping of scene between America and Russia. But the New York press gave it very favorable reviews.

Like many American films of the time, One Law for Both was subject to cuts by city and state film censorship boards. The Chicago Board of Censors cut, starting with reel 3, several intertitles including "I will free all of the prisoners - for a price", "I am to become the wife of the noblest man in Poland and I will not come to him degraded", "The break of another day", "I, a spy, a traitor? Rather did I betray my honor to set you free", and "Elga forgive our accusation. You did not commit an act of shame", and the scene of a man drawing back portieres to a bedroom and the two following bedroom scenes; in reel 4 the intertitle "I must kill the man who robbed you of your honor" and the shooting of Slezak and his falling; in reel 5 the scene of a woman's gown falling off of her shoulders and the intertitle "I will expect you in the palace within an hour"; in reel 6 the vision scene of the bedroom in the governor's palace; and in reel 7 intertitles "I love my other papa better" and "Elga's was a sacrifice for others", two scenes of a man in the adventuress' bedroom, and a vision of the shooting.

== Status ==
The film's preservation status is classified as unknown, which suggests that it is a lost film.
