= The Black Panther's Cub =

1921 film

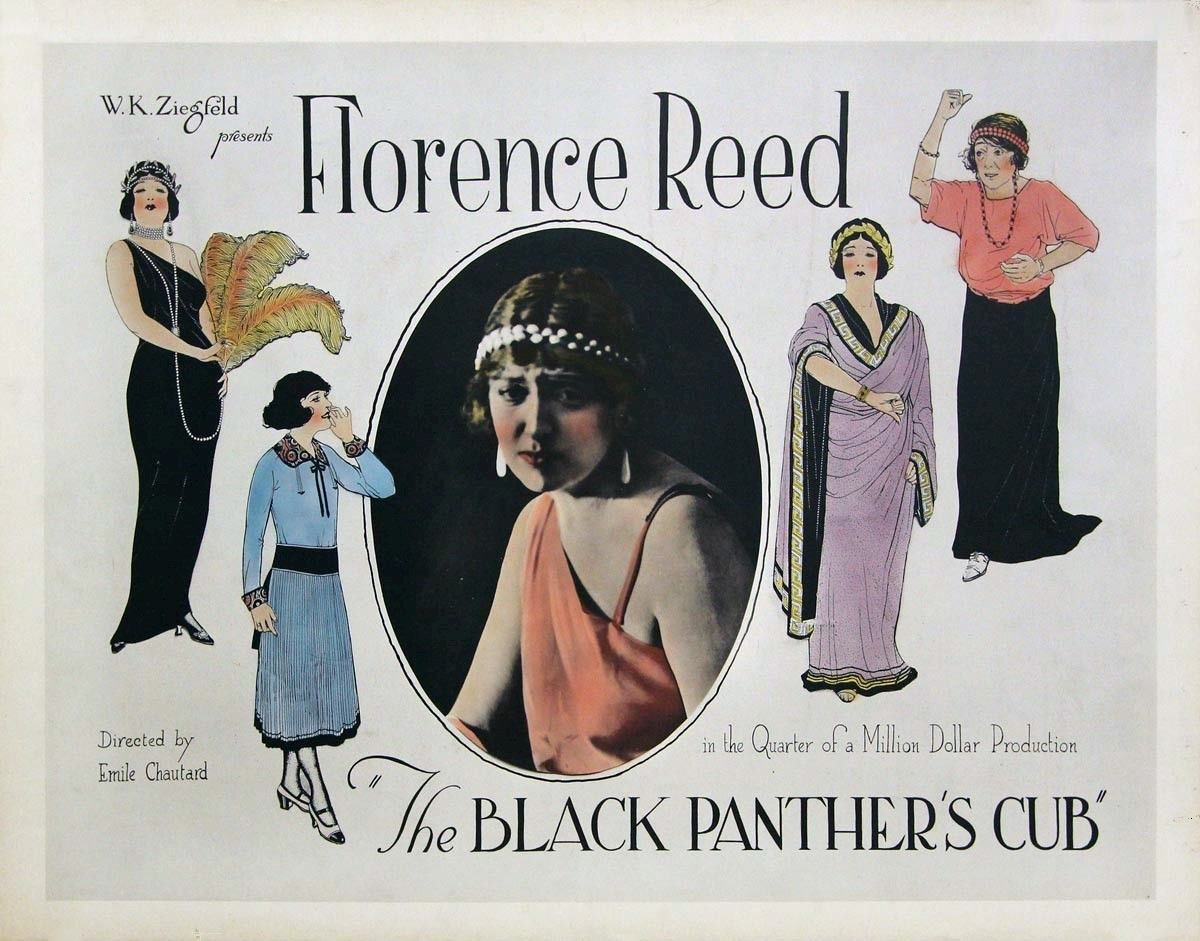
- Film poster
- Directed by: Emile Chautard
- Written by: Algernon Swinburne (poem: Faustine); Ethel Donoher (story); Philip Bartholomae (adaptation)
- Produced by: William F. Ziegfeld
- Starring: Florence Reed; Earle Foxe; Norman Trevor; Henry Stephenson; Tyrone Power Sr.
- Cinematography: Jacques Monteran – (French Wikipedia); Alfred Ortlieb
- Production company: Ziegfeld Cinema Corporation
- Distributed by: Equity Pictures Corporation
- Release date: May 15, 1921 (U.S.)
- Running time: 5 reels
- Country: United States
- Language: Silent (English intertitles)

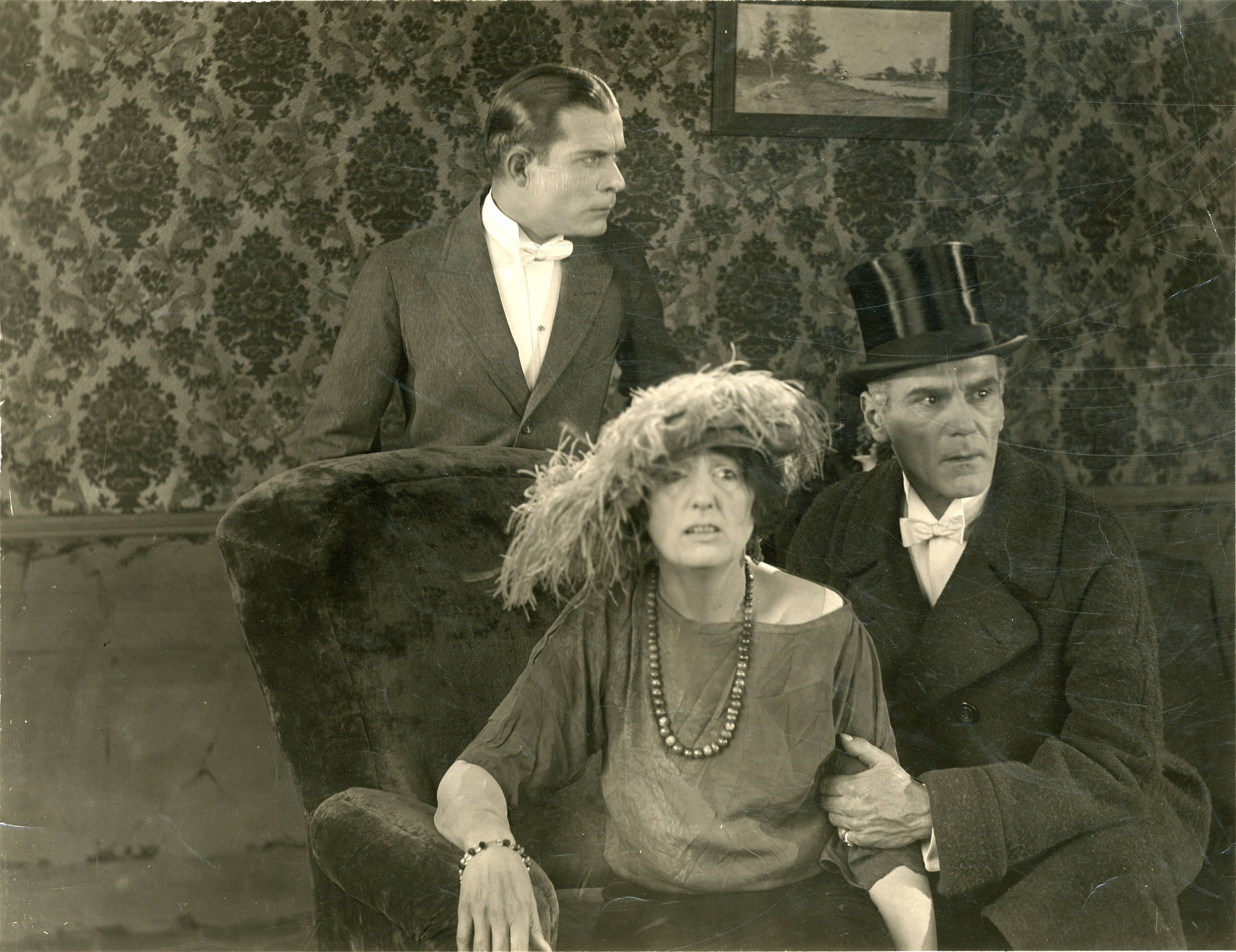
Still photo from the film, with Florence Reed, Earle Foxe, and Norman Trevor

The Black Panther's Cub is a 1921 American silent melodrama film produced by William K. Ziegfeld, Florenz Ziegfeld's younger brother. It stars stage actress Florence Reed in her last silent screen portrayal where she plays multiple roles. It is a lost film.

== Plot ==
As summarized in a film publication, when the law closes the Black Panther's (Reed) house, she gives her daughter into the keeping of her old friend Clive (Stephenson). Clive dies and the Cub (Reed), now a young lady, learns who her mother was. Lord Maudsley (Foxe), Clive's son, is in financial difficulty. He makes the Cub believe that dead benefactor has left large debts, and persuades her to reopen her mother's establishment to obtain the money. She does, and the former admirers of the Black Panther marvel at the way she has retained her youth. Eventually the Cub meets her mother (Reed), now an old woman, in a dive to which the Cub has fled with an admirer to get away from the man she loved, but feared to face in her new existence. The place is raided and the mother is shot. Later Maudsley admits that it was he who needed the money, and the lover forgives the Cub and they are happy together.

== Cast ==
- Florence Reed as The Black Panther / Mary Maudsley / Faustine
- Norman Trevor as Sir Marling Grayham
- Henry Stephenson as Clive, Earl of Maudsley
- Paul Doucet as Victim of Chance (credited as Paul Ducet)
- Don Merrifield as Sir Charles Beresford
- Henry Carvill as Lord Whitford
- Louis R. Grisel as Butler (credited as Louis Grisel)
- Earle Foxe as Lord Maudsley
- William Roselle as Hampton Grayham
- Paula Shay as Evelyn Grayham
- Halbert Brown as Mr. Laird
- Charles Jackson as Stable Boy
- Ernest Lambart as Money Lender
- Frank DeVernon as Philanthropist
- Tyrone Power Sr. as Count Boris Orliff (credited as Tyrone Power)
