= Helen Lackaye =

American actress

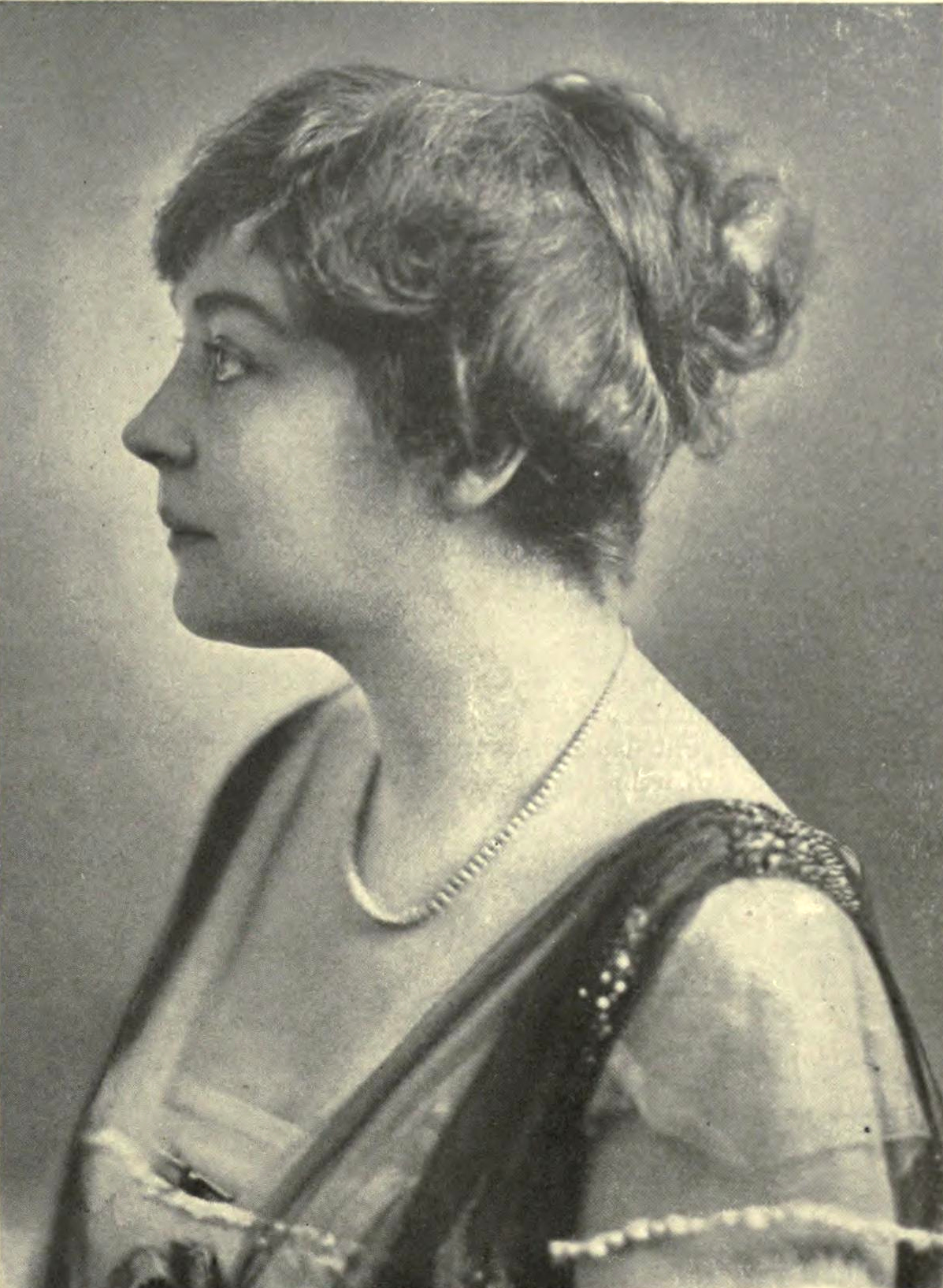
- Helen Lackaye, from a 1916 publication
- Born: January 10, 1883; Washington, D.C.
- Died: October 19, 1940 (aged 57)
- Spouse: Harry J. Ridings
- Relatives: Wilton Lackaye (brother)

Helen Lackaye (January 10, 1883 – October 19, 1940) was an American actress.

== Life and career ==
Lackaye was born on January 10, 1883, in Washington, D.C. She was the sister of actors Wilton Lackaye and James Lackaye and attended school at Holy Cross Convent in Washington, D. C.

Lackaye debuted on stage in New York City in Ninety and Nine at the Academy of Music, after which she performed with Amelia Bingham's repertory company. She debuted on Broadway portraying Hippolyta in A Midsummer Night's Dream (1903).

She was married to Harry J. Ridings, who managed the Cohan Grand Opera House in Chicago.

Lackaye died on October 19, 1940, on a Baltimore and Ohio train travelling through Pennsylvania to the Jersey City Terminal in Jersey City, New Jersey.

At the time of her death, Lackaye had been living in New York for twelve years and had effectively retired from acting. The previous year she had taught dramatics in Cincinnati, Ohio.

== Filmography ==
=== In theatre ===
- She Walked in Her Sleep (1918)
- Crooked Gamblers (1920) as Mrs. Robertson
- As Ye Mould (1921) as Mrs. J. Lomax Graham
- Captain Applejack (1921) as Mrs. Pengard
- Izzy (1924) as Mary Byrd
- 90 Horse Power (1926) as Mrs. Charles Loring
- Gentle Grafters (1926) as Kitty Doyle
- Revolt (1928) as Mrs. Emily Pasteel

=== In film ===
- The Knife (1918) as Louise Meredith
