= Go Get 'Em Hutch =

1922 film

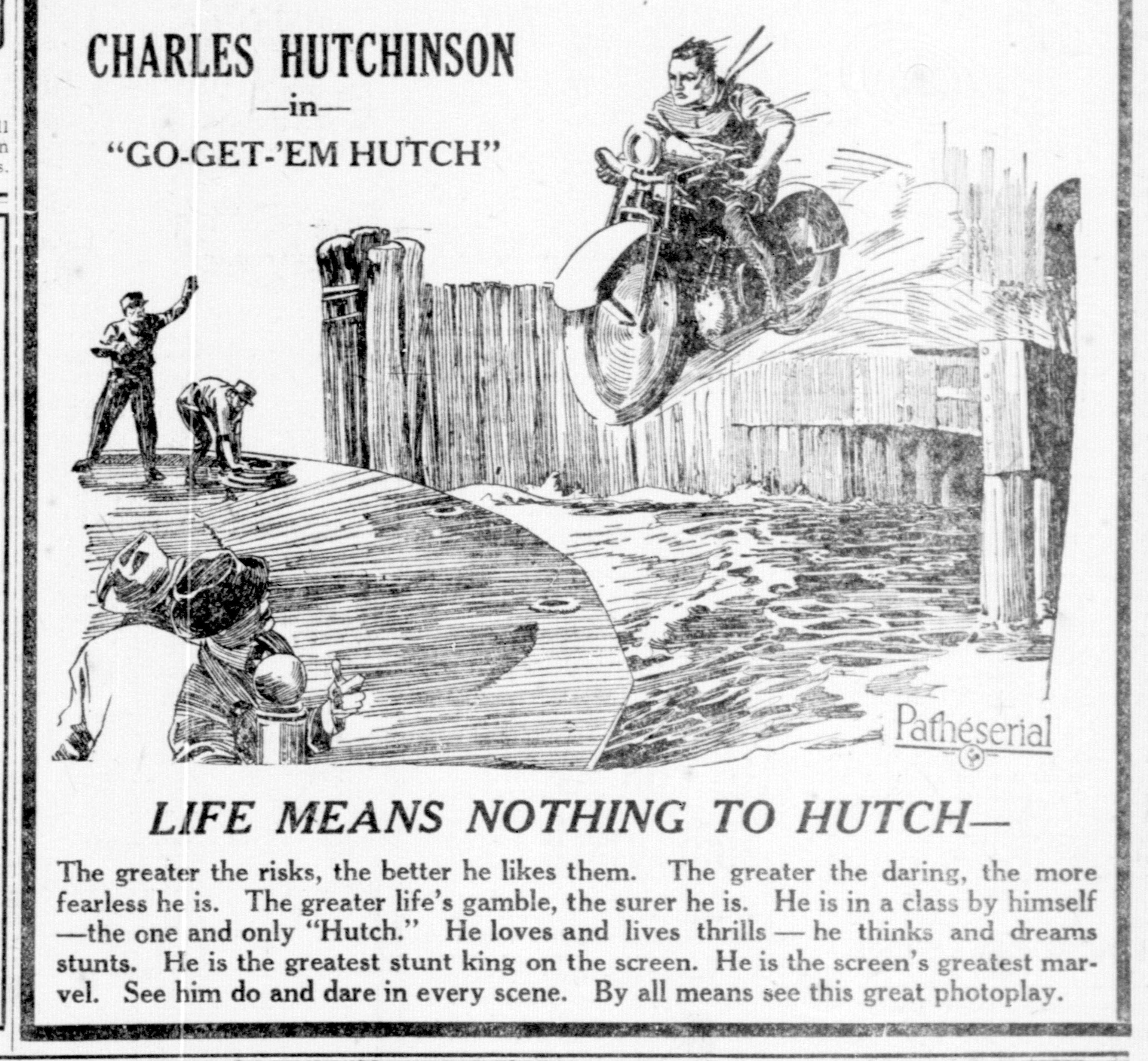
- Drawing to advertise the film in a contemporary newspaper
- Directed by: George B. Seitz
- Written by: Frank Leon Smith
- Produced by: George B. Seitz
- Starring: Charles Hutchison; Marguerite Clayton
- Production company: George B. Seitz Productions
- Distributed by: Pathé Exchange
- Release date: April 9, 1922
- Running time: 15 episodes
- Country: United States
- Language: Silent (English intertitles)

Go Get 'Em Hutch is a 1922 American drama film serial directed by George B. Seitz. The story concerns a crooked lawyer who is the head of a crime syndicate. He seeks to prevent the operation of the ships owned by the heroine, played by Marguerite Clayton. Hutch, the title character played by Charles Hutchison, comes to her rescue.

The film is presumed to be lost however all or parts are listed as being held at Gosfilmofond, the National Film Foundation of the Russian Federation.

== Plot ==
As described in a film magazine, the theme centers around Hutch McClellund (Hutchison), owner of McClellund Shipping Industries, who forms a partnership with Dariel Bainbridge (Clayton), who has inherited her father's shipbuilding business. Hilton Lennox (Neill) and Fay Vallon (Shepard) are unscrupulous plotters who aim to prevent Hutch from getting his ships out to sea with their cargoes. These obstacles allow Hutch numerous opportunities for spectacular stunts.

== Cast ==
- Charles Hutchison as Hutch McClellund
- Marguerite Clayton as Dariel Bainbridge
- Richard Neill as Hilton Lennox
- Frank Hagney
- Pearl Shepard as Fay Vallon
- Joe Cuny
- Cecile Bonnel

== Chapter titles ==
1. Chained to the Anchor
2. The Falling Wall
3. The Runaway Car
4. The Crushing Menace
5. Shot into Space
6. Under the Avalanche
7. On Danger's Highway
8. The Broken Life Line
9. Under the Cauldron
10. The Edge of the Roof
11. The Air-Line Route
12. Between the Rails
13. Under the Ice
14. In the Doorway of Death
15. Ten Minutes to Live

== See also ==
- List of film serials
- List of film serials by studio
