= Meddling Women =

1924 film by Ivan Abramson

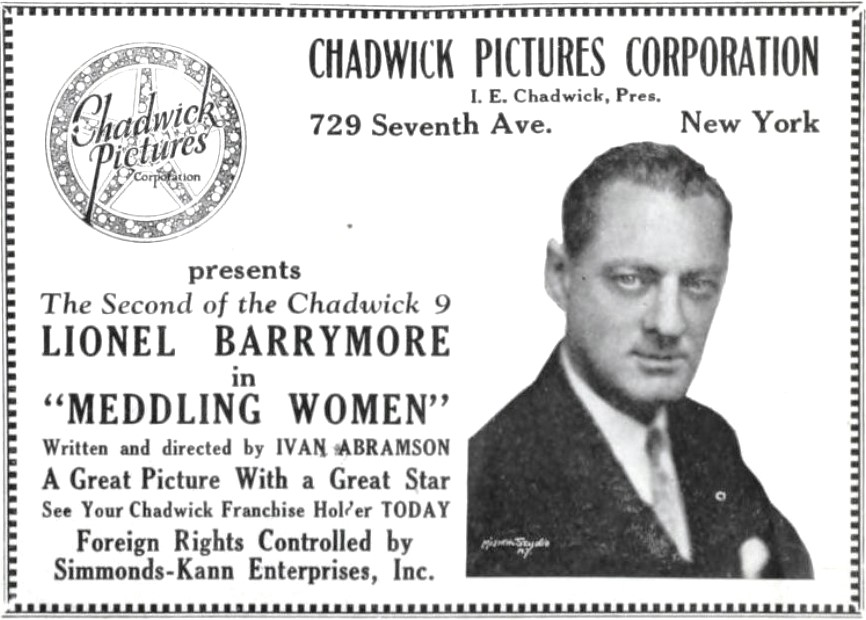
- Advertisement
- Directed by: Ivan Abramson
- Written by: Ivan Abramson
- Produced by: I.E. Chadwick
- Starring: Lionel Barrymore
- Cinematography: Frank Zucker
- Production company: Chadwick Pictures Corporation
- Release date: November 15, 1924 (United States)
- Running time: 7 reels
- Country: United States
- Language: Silent (English intertitles)

Meddling Women is a 1924 American silent drama film produced by Chadwick Pictures Corporation and distributed by them and/or a State's Rights basis. Directed by Ivan Abramson, the film stars Lionel Barrymore.

== Cast ==
- Lionel Barrymore as Edwin Ainsworth/John Wells
- Sigrid Holmquist as Grace Ainsworth
- Dagmar Godowsky as Madeline
- Hugh Thompson as Harold Chase
- Ida Darling as Mrs. Ainsworth
- Alice Hegeman as Claudia Browne
- Antonio D'Algy as Vincente (credited as Tony D'Algy)
- William Bechtel as Doctor Giani

== Preservation ==
A copy of Meddling Women is preserved in the Library of Congress.

== See also ==
- Lionel Barrymore filmography
