= The Sky Ranger (1928 film) =

1928 film

- Directed by: Harry Joe Brown (credited as Harry J. Brown)
- Written by: Thomson Burtis
- Based on: Russ Farrell, Aviator stories by Thomson Burtis
- Produced by: Charles R. Rogers; Bruce Mitchell (assistant producer)
- Starring: Reed Howes; Marjorie Daw; Roy Stewart
- Cinematography: Frank Good
- Production companies: Educational Films; Charles R. Rogers Productions
- Distributed by: Educational Films
- Release date: September 23, 1928
- Running time: 32 minutes (two reels)
- Country: United States
- Language: Silent (English intertitles)

The Sky Ranger is a 1928 American silent short film. Directed by Harry Joe Brown the film was an adventure film involving the character of "flyboy" Russ Farrell. (Note: The earlier film serial, The Sky Ranger had the same title, but was unrelated.)

== Plot ==
Agent Russ Farrell (Reed Howes) of the U.S. Air Patrol, is assigned to the border patrol on the United States/Mexico border. He meets Nancy Feldmore (Marjorie Daw), who worries about his dangerous job.

Farrell flies to a rough border town, where Nancy's father, Senator Feldmore (Henry A. Barrows) is being held prisoner by Chinese smugglers.

Using his aircraft to good advantage, Farrell overcomes the smugglers, and frees the Senator, earning Nancy's gratitude.

== Cast ==
- Reed Howes as Russ Farrell
- Marjorie Daw as Nancy Feldmore
- Roy Stewart as Captain Kennard
- Henry A. Barrows Senator Feldmore (credited as Henry Barrows)
- Bobby Dunn as Obie, the mechanic
- Tom Santschi as "Blackie" Williams
- Buck Black as Buck Feldmore

== Production ==
The Sky Ranger was based on the popular "Russ Farrell" magazine stories, that appeared in The American Boy magazine. The films that were developed were part of a Russ Farrell, Aviator series starring Reed Howes as the dashing, devil-may-care flyboy hero.

== Reception ==
The Sky Ranger was a short that would appear on the "bottom of the bill" as a B-film. The leading man, Reed Howes, was an expert stunt performer, but was not an aviator. Consequently, "most of the more dangerous flying stunts were performed by doubles. Diminutive short-subject "funster" Bobby Dunn provides marginal comic relief."
