= Wilton Lackaye =

American actor (1862–1932)

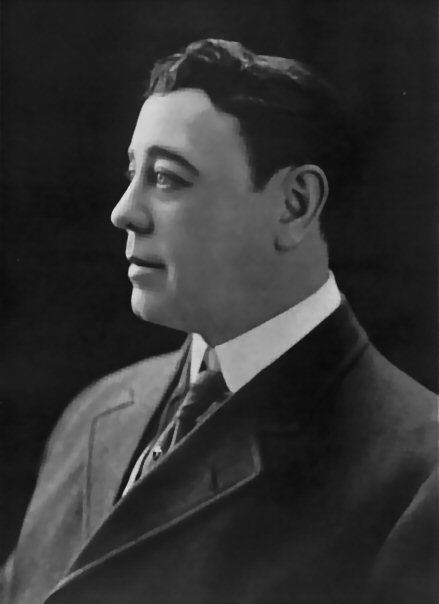
- Theatre Magazine, 1908

Shepherd of The Lambs
- In office 1906–1907
- Preceded by: DeWolf Hopper
- Succeeded by: Augustus Thomas

Personal details
- Born: William Andrew Lackey; September 30, 1862 Loudoun County, Virginia
- Died: August 22, 1932 (aged 69) New York City, New York
- Resting place: Calvary Cemetery, Queens, N.Y.
- Spouse(s): Annie Lewis (died 1896); Alice Evans (1 child); Katherine Alberta Riley
- Children: 1
- Relatives: Helen Lackaye (sister)

Wilton Lackaye (né William Andrew Lackey; September 30, 1862 – August 22, 1932) was an American stage and film actor, who originated the role of Svengali (from the 1895 novel Trilby) in both stage and film.

== Early life ==
William Andrew Lackey was born in Loudoun County, Virginia, the son of James Lackey and his wife, Margaret Bagnam. He attended Georgetown University and Ottawa College, initially planning to be a priest. As an amateur, he acted with the Lawrence Barrett Club of Washington.

== Career ==
Lackaye's professional acting debut occurred in 1883 when he portrayed Lucentio in Francesca da Rimini at the Star Theatre in New York. That summer, he performed with a stock company in Dayton, after which he worked with the Carrie Swain Company.

He created the role of Svengali in the play Trilby in 1895 which he played on screen in 1915 opposite Clara Kimball Young. His film debut came in The Pit (1914). Lackaye toured in vaudeville during World War I, performing in the one-act plays Quits and The Bomb.

== Personal life ==
He married three times: first to actress Annie Lewis, second to Alice Evans, and lastly to Katherine Alberta Riley. He had a son Wilton Lackaye Jr. with Alice Evans.

He had two siblings in show business: James Lackaye Jr. and Helen Lackaye.

== Death ==
Lackaye died of an acute heart attack at age 69 at his home in New York City. His funeral was held in St. Malachy's Roman Catholic Church, and he was buried in Calvary Cemetery.

== Filmography ==
- The Pit (1914)
- Children of the Ghetto (1915)
- Trilby (1915)
- The Man of Shame (1915)
- God's Crucible (1921)
- What's Wrong with the Women? (1922)
- The Lone Wolf (1924)
- For Woman's Favor (1924)
- The Sky Raider (1925)
