= The Impostor (1926 film) =

1926 American silent film

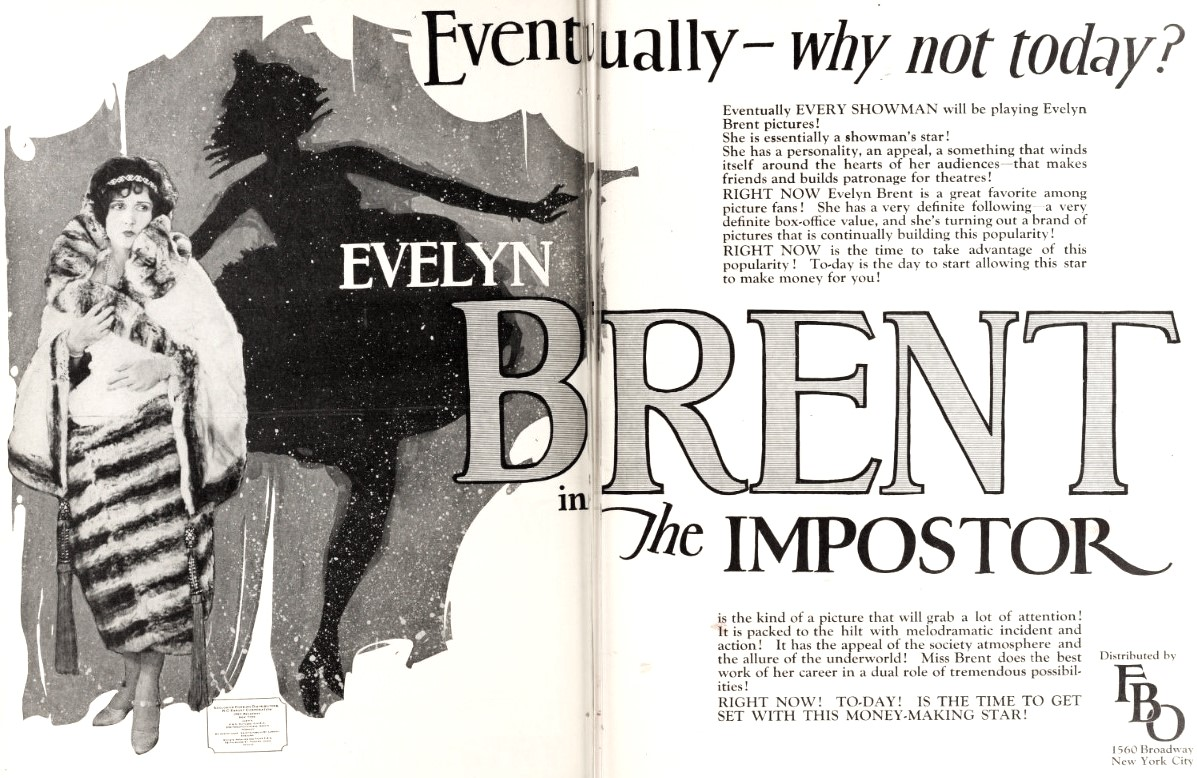
- Advertisement
- Directed by: Chester Withey
- Written by: Ewart Adamson; Clifford Howard
- Produced by: Joseph P. Kennedy
- Starring: Evelyn Brent; Carroll Nye; James Morrison
- Cinematography: Roy H. Klaffki
- Production company: Gothic Productions
- Distributed by: Film Booking Offices of America
- Release date: September 12, 1926
- Running time: 60 minutes
- Country: United States
- Language: Silent (English intertitles)

The Impostor is a 1926 American silent crime film directed by Chester Withey and starring Evelyn Brent, Carroll Nye, and James Morrison.

== Plot ==
As described in a film magazine, Dick Gilbert, a struggling young man, uses a family jewel as collateral for a loan to cover his gambling debts. However, the jewel is then stolen by a notorious gambler. His sister Judith disguises herself as a street girl to retrieve the jewel, which her father was holding as security for a Count. She pretends to also be a thief, leading to exciting incidents. After learning that the jewel has been sold to a social climber seeking to improve her standing with the Gilbert family, Judith, still disguised as a thief, offers to impersonate herself at a garden party. During the party, the woman returns the jewel. After several interesting occurrences, Judith manages to return the jewel to the safe in time. Her brother, unaware of this, confesses. The thief De Mornoff breaks in, again attempting to steal the jewel, but Judith confronts him with a gun. The brother is forgiven, and Bruce Gordon, a newspaper reporter who has been following the "girl thief" for the story, desires to marry her to "make an honest woman of her" and learns her identity. Judith tells the reporter that he still has a chance with her.

== Cast ==
- Evelyn Brent as Judith Gilbert
- Carroll Nye as Dick Gilbert
- James Morrison as Bruce Gordon
- Frank Leigh as De Mornoff
- James Quinn as Lefty
- Carlton Griffin as Morris
- Edna Griffin as Ann Penn

== Bibliography ==
- Connelly, Robert B. The Silents: Silent Feature Films, 1910-36, Volume 40, Issue 2. December Press, 1998. ISBN 0-913-20436-6
- Munden, Kenneth White. The American Film Institute Catalog of Motion Pictures Produced in the United States, Part 1. University of California Press, 1997. ISBN 9780520209695
