= Peggy Shanor =

American actress in silent films (1895–1935

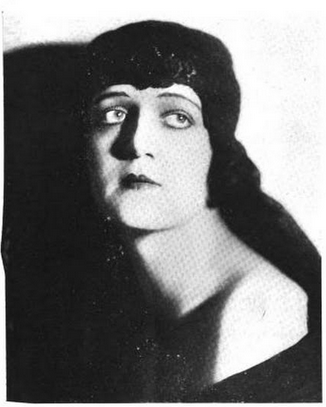
- Shanor, from a 1918 publication.
- Born: 1895; Sistersville, West Virginia, Virginia, U.S.
- Died: May 30, 1935 (aged 39); New York City, New York, U.S.
- Occupation: Actress

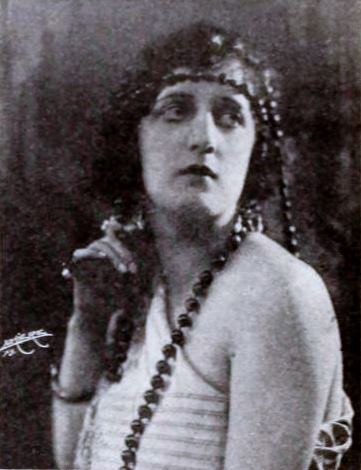
Shanor, January 1920

Peggy Shanor (November 1895 – May 30, 1935) was an American actress in silent films.

== Early life ==
Margaret Marion Shanor was from Sistersville, West Virginia, and raised in the Pittsburgh area, the daughter of Perry Absalom Shanor and Etta Kate Leasure Shanor. Her father, who was elected to represent Sistersville in the West Virginia legislature soon after Peggy was born, was a leader in the Loyal Order of Moose, and the International Order of Odd Fellows.

== Career ==
Shanor appeared in several silent films, notably in vamp roles in serials, including The House of Hate (1918), The Queen of Hearts (1918), The Echo of Youth (1919), The Lurking Peril (1919), The Mystery Mind (1920), The Man Who Stole the Moon (1921), and The Prodigal Judge (1922). "Peggy Shanor distinguished herself, in The House of Hate, by her ability to go upstairs in a truly regal manner," noted one film magazine of her day. She declined an offer to make films for an English production company in 1919. Shanor commented on her typecasting as a "vamp" in a 1920 interview: "I don't know why the public persists in calling any woman character in a play or picture who has red blood, brains or allurement a 'vamp'. The word irritates me excessively."

Stage roles, mainly in Somerville, Massachusetts, included Yes or No? (1917), Behind the Screen (1922), The Goldfish (1923), Very Bright Green (1923), Grumpy (1923), and Love 'Em and Leave 'Em (1926).

Shanor was one of the entertainers donating their talents at a "smoke fund" benefit in New York in 1918, raising money to send cigarettes to American troops in World War I. In 1921, she visited orphans in the Jewish Foster Home of Germantown, with colleagues Vera Gordon and Stanley Price. In 1922 she was in the news for her role in a "hospital mystery", as fellow film actor Earle Foxe collapsed in her apartment at the Knickerbocker Hotel. They were rumored to be romantically involved.

== Personal life ==
Peggy Shanor was engaged to marry Harry Caplan in 1923. She died in New York City in 1935, aged 39 years, "after a brief illness", according to her obituary in Variety.
