= Out of the Storm (1920 film) =

1920 film directed by William Parke

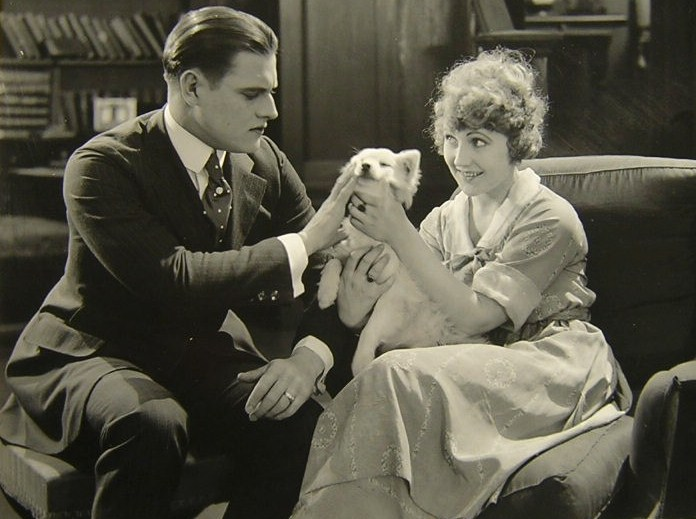
- A scene from the film
- Directed by: William Parke
- Written by: J.E. Nash
- Based on: Tower of Ivory by Gertrude Atherton
- Starring: Barbara Castleton; John Bowers; Sidney Ainsworth
- Cinematography: André Barlatier
- Edited by: Frank E. Hull
- Production company: Eminent Authors Pictures
- Distributed by: Goldwyn Pictures Corporation
- Release date: June 1920
- Running time: 50 minutes
- Country: United States
- Language: Silent (English intertitles)

Out of the Storm is a 1920 American silent drama film directed by William Parke, and starring Barbara Castleton, John Bowers, and Sidney Ainsworth. It is an adaptation of Gertrude Atherton's 1910 novel Tower of Ivory.

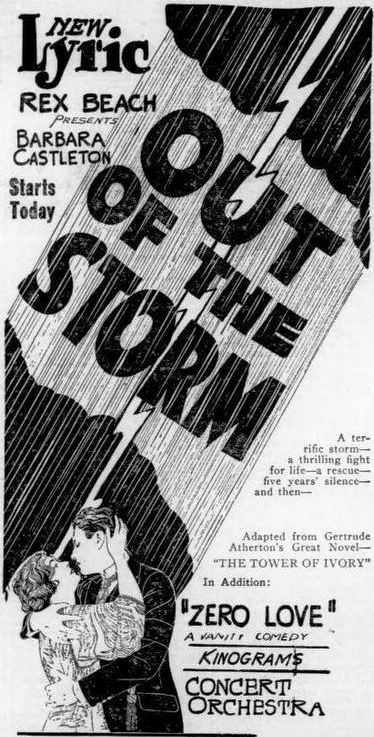
Newspaper advertisement

== Plot ==
As described in a film magazine, Margaret Hill (Castleton), a singer in a disreputable cafe, attracts the attention of Al Levering (Ainsworth), and he offers to have her voice cultivated. At the end of several years, Levering is arrested for embezzlement, and confesses that he stole to give Margaret her chance. While he is serving his sentence Margaret finishes her musical education and tours England, where she meets John Ordham (Bowers), who saved her from drowning in a shipwreck while en route to Europe. Levering escapes from jail and goes to London to claim his protege. To protect Ordham from the wrath of Levering, she tells the Englishman that Levering is her husband. Police pick up the trail of the ex-convict and while he is trying to make his escape he is killed. This leaves nothing in the way of the love between Margaret and Ordham.

== Cast ==
- Barbara Castleton as Margaret Hill
- John Bowers as John Ordham
- Sidney Ainsworth as Al Levering
- Doris Pawn as Mabel Cutting
- Elinor Hancock as Mrs. Cutting
- Lawson Butt as Lord Bridgeminster
- Ashton Dearholt as Walter Driscombe
- Edythe Chapman as Lady Bridgeminster
- Carrie Clark Ward as Teddy
- Lincoln Stedman as Sir Reggie Blanchard
- Clarissa Selwynne as Lady Rosamond
- J. Ray Avery

== Differences from the book ==
In the original text, Tower of Ivory (1910) by Gertrude Atherton, Margaret Hill and John Ordham would meet on a boat and fall in love. However, they become separated due to a shipwreck, and would reunite 5 years later by accident at Hill’s concert. Ordham would then approach Hill and ask for her hand in marriage. This is different from the film, in which Ordham would rescue Hill from the shipwreck, and that event would be the one that sparked their romantic relationship. The director likely made this change to decrease run-time and add a suspenseful sea rescue scene, which proved to be the right idea since that scene in particular was praised by critics.

== Critical response ==
Out of the Storm (1920) received generally negative feedback from the audience. As the fourth movie out of eleven adapted from a novel, original text’s author Gertrude Atherton is certainly no stranger to adaptations onto the big screen. The plot was praised for its ability to “hold one’s interest by reason of its melodramatic moments, which are punctuated by other scenes that lack reality”, but the largest disappointment was certainly the performance that lead actress Castleton failed to deliver. Critics from the Exhibitors Herald described Castleton’s acting as “unnatural and stilting”, and was the “most unnatural and unempathetic of the entire cast.” They further stated that she “plays it with too much restraint”. This left audiences unsatisfied, considering castleton having “a very good account of herself” in other films. One redeeming factor from critics were that the shipwreck scene was “one of the best shipwreck scenes” to be produced at that time.

== Preservation ==
With no prints of Out of the Storm located in any film archives, it is considered a lost film.

== Bibliography ==
- Goble, Alan. The Complete Index to Literary Sources in Film. Walter de Gruyter, 1999.
