= The Mystery Mind =

1920 silent film serial by Will S. Davis

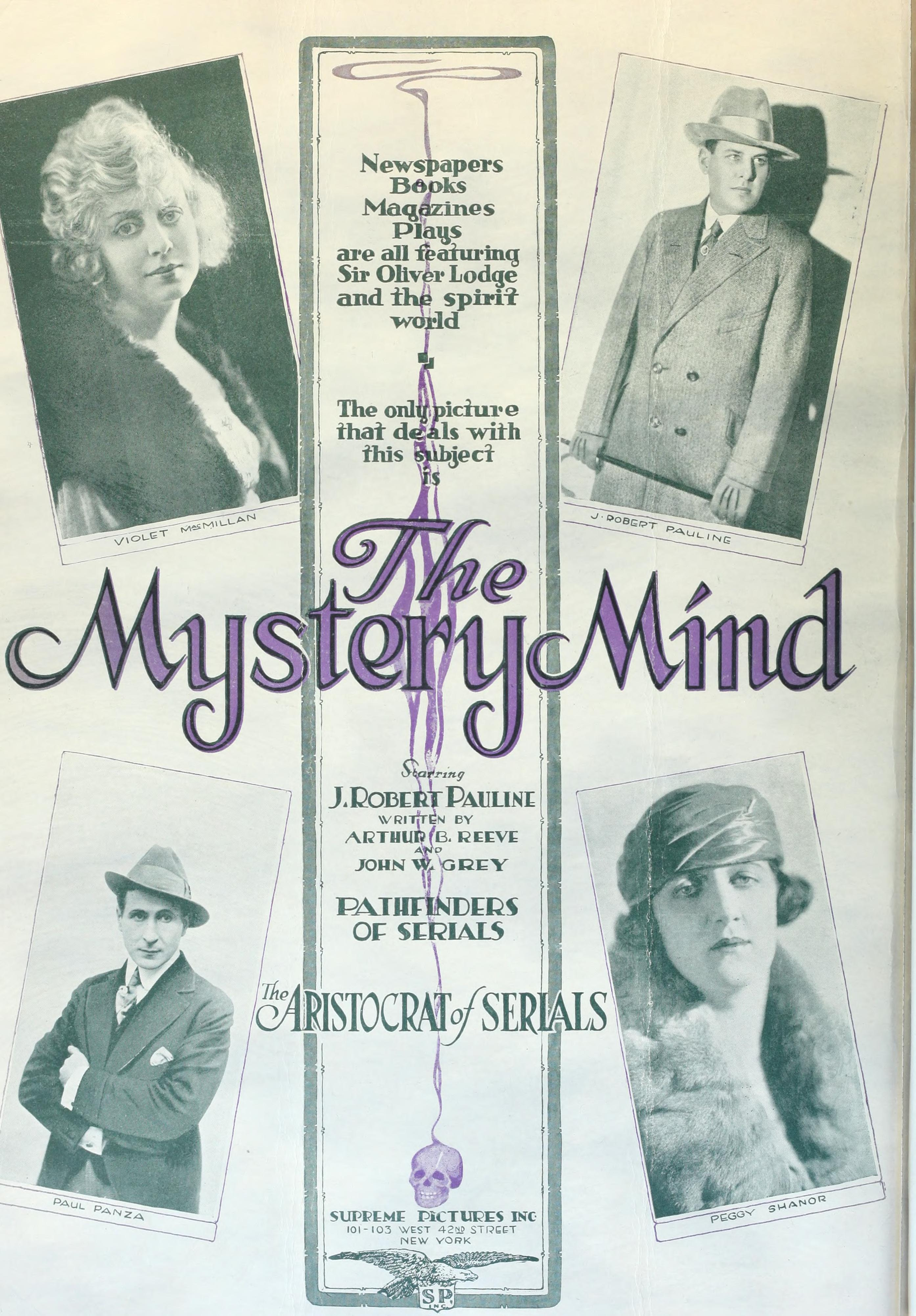
- Magazine advertisement
- Directed by: Will S. Davis; Fred Sittenham
- Written by: John W. Grey; Arthur B. Reeve
- Production company: Supreme Pictures
- Release date: November 1920

The Mystery Mind is a 1920 American crime drama silent black and white film serial directed by Will S. Davis and written by John W. Grey and Arthur B. Reeve. An homonym novel is based on this film, also written by Grey.

In the story a variety of weird assassins controlled by "the Mystery Mind," a disembodied voice who can command living people to do his bidding, threaten Violet Bronson, the daughter of an explorer, who they believe may know the location of the treasure of Atlantis. She is defended by her fiance Robert Dupont, a hypnotist, and her adoptive father who she calls "Doctor Daddy." The assassins include a hunchback, a faceless man called Phantom Face, Carl "the Wolf" Canfield, Vera "the Snake" Collins, "The Fox" and a strangler. A new weird menace appears in almost every episode, making this serial the one that likely included more villains in the cast than any other. The trail to the treasure leads to the Orinoco in Florida and there a weird civilization dominated by a three-eyed witch doctor is discovered, as is the treasure and the secret of the entity known as the Mystery Mind.

The setup of the serial draws inspiration from The Mysteries of Myra, a 1916 serial in which another young blonde heroine also subject to the mental control of a master villain is protected by a man with a romantic interest in her who also has a mystical side to him from a variety of weird threatening menaces, again, often one new threat or even monster per episode. One episode of Myra was actually entitled "The Mystery Mind."

The episodes of the film were The Hypnotic Club, The Fires of Fury, The War of Wills, The Fumes of Fear, Though Waves, A Halo of Help, The Nether World, The Mystery Mind, Dual Personality, Hounds of Hate, The Sleepwalker, The Temple of the Occult, The Building Ray, The Water Cure, and The Gold of the Gods.

== Cast ==
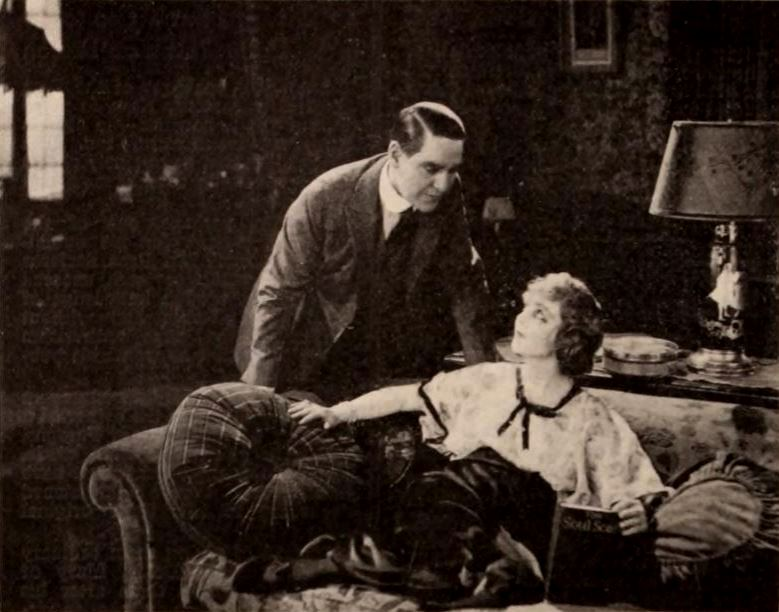
Film still with Pauline and MacMillan

- J. Robert Pauline as Robert Dupont
- Violet MacMillan as Violet Bronson
- Paul Panzer as Carl 'The Wolf' Canfield
- Ed Rogers as Carl Canfield
- Peggy Shanor as Vera Collins
- Saville De Sacia
- Edward Elkas
- Arthur Pierot
- Baby Ivy Ward as Violet as a child

== Preservation ==
It is unknown whether the film serial survives as no copies of any episodes have been located, likely lost.
