= Annie Lewis =

American actress

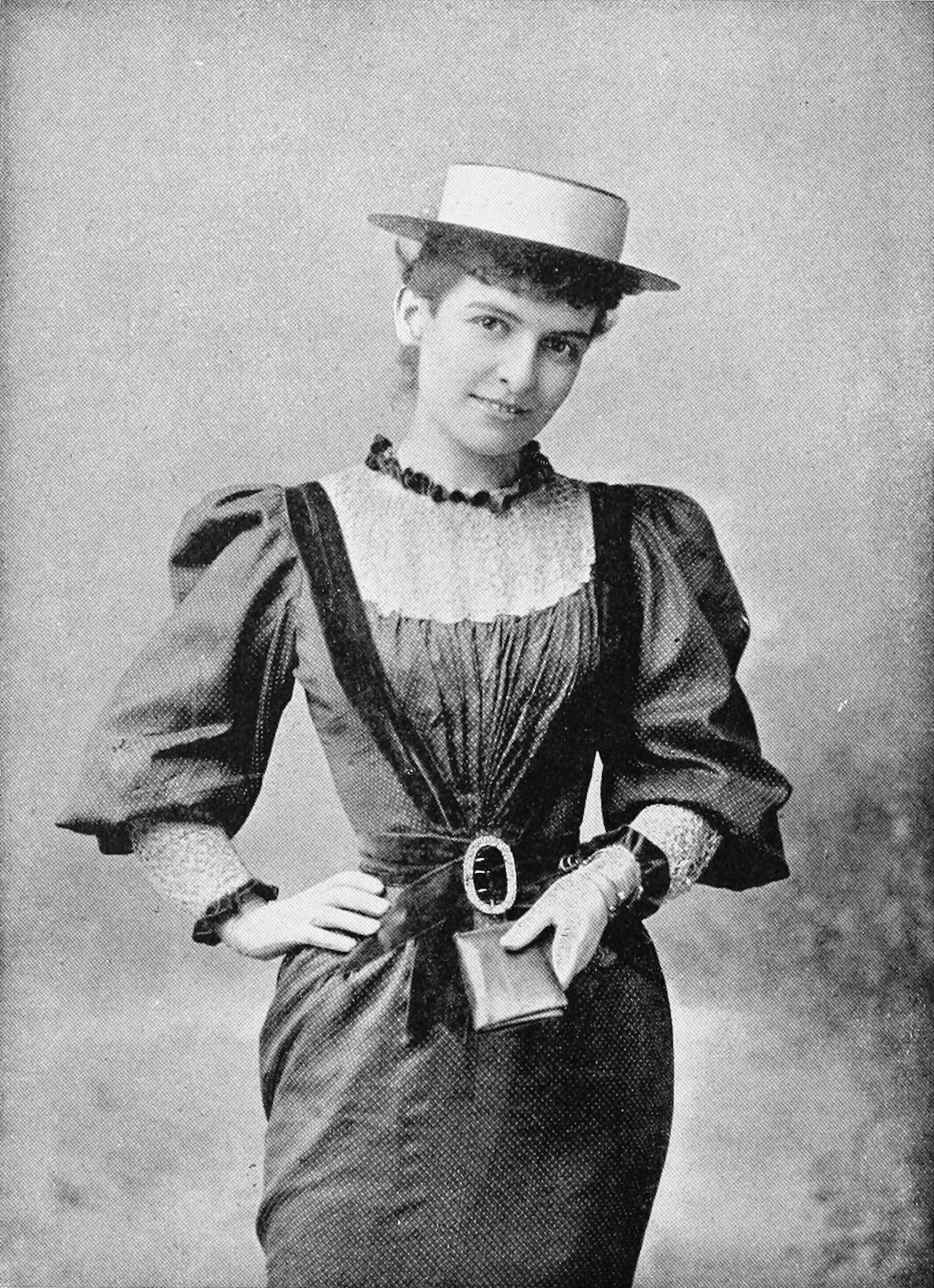
- The Marie Burroughs Art Portfolio of Stage Celebrities, 1894
- Born: Annie B. Lewis c. 1869; Washington D. C., USA
- Died: October 5, 1896 (aged 27); Washington D. C., USA
- Other name: Little Annie Lewis
- Occupation: Musical comedy soubrette
- Spouse: Wilton Lackaye

Annie Lewis (c. 1869 – October 5, 1896) was an American soubrette of light operas and musical comedies who died from tuberculosis in her twenties.

== Biography ==
Annie B. Lewis was born and raised in Washington D.C. where her father, Charles Lewis, clerked for the U.S. Treasury Department. Early on Lewis demonstrated a talent for mimicry and by age four she was performing on stage under the eye of her mother, Amelia Lewis, a former parlor entertainer. At that age her song-and-dance routine oftentimes would be performed atop a piano to enable her to be seen by the audience.

By sixteen Lewis was touring the country with her own company as the soubrette in Lincoln A. Fisher's Little Trump, and the following year with Charles Verner in Shamus O’Brien, a romantic comedy from the poem by Frederick Maeder and Thomas B. Macdonough. Lewis would go on to play leading roles in productions of Favette, a comedietta in one act, adapted for the stage by John Treshar from the story by Ouida; Our Irish Visitor; David Loyd's The Woman-Hater; Gus Heege productions of A Lumber Camp in Winter and Yon Yonson; the comic opera Prince Pro Tem by Robert A. Barnet and Lewis S. Thompson, first performed at the Boston Museum on September 17, 1894; Frederick Hallen and Joseph Hart's vaudeville skit Later On; and A Nutmeg March by William Hawthorn.

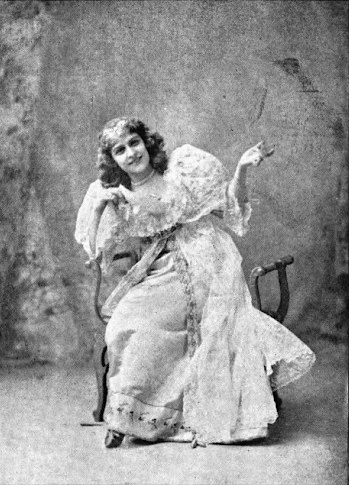
Photograph of Lewis published in The Opera Glass magazine, 1894

In May 1895 she supported Camille D'Arville at the Broadway Theatre in A Daughter of the Revolution, a historical comic opera by J. Cheever Goodwin and Ludwig Engländer. A short time later ill health would force her to withdraw from performing.

Lewis married William Lackey on December 22, 1886, in Essex, Ontario, Canada. Lackey was known on the stage as Wilton Lackaye and would go on to have a long career in theater and film. At the time she was 17 and he 25.

She died in October 1896 at her parents' Washington home, nearly a year after what was thought to have been a bad cold had developed into tuberculosis. Lewis spent some time in the months that followed in the American Southwest in a hope that the dry weather there would help improve her health. A successful benefit concert organized by her brother-in-law in the summer of 1896 in Washington D. C. raised needed funds for her care. Just two years earlier it had been reported in the press that Lewis had purchased in cash a $9,000 granite-and-brick house for her parents in the Chevy Chase, neighborhood of Washington D. C.
