= How Could You, Caroline? =

1918 silent film by Frederick A. Thomson

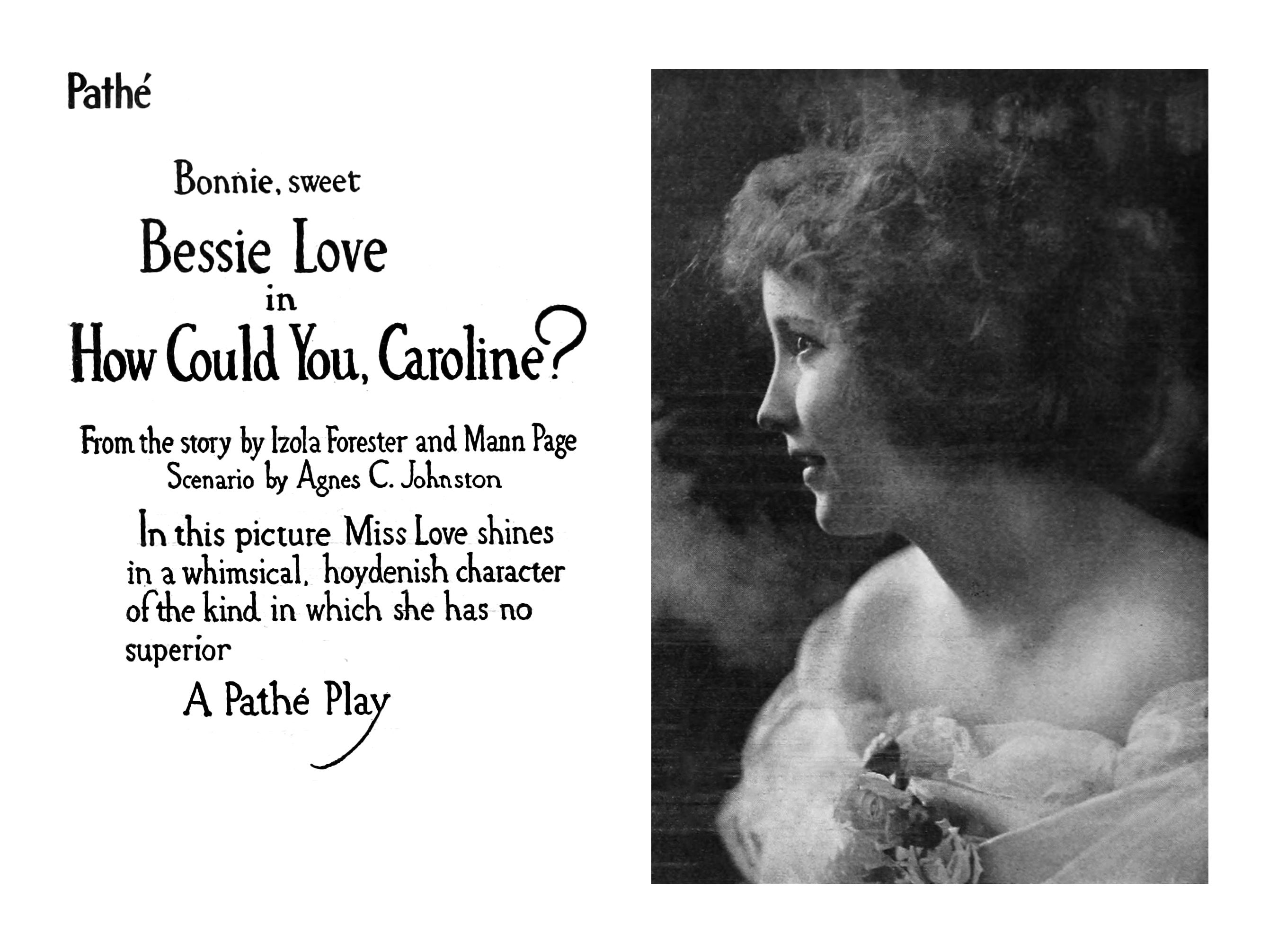
- Magazine advertisement
- Directed by: Frederick A. Thomson
- Screenplay by: Agnes Christine Johnston
- Based on: "How Could You, Caroline?" (story) by: Izola Forester; Mann Page
- Starring: Bessie Love; James W. Morrison; Dudley Hawley
- Production company: Pathé Exchange
- Distributed by: Pathé Exchange
- Release date: May 5, 1918 (U.S.)
- Running time: 5 reels
- Country: United States
- Language: Silent (English intertitles)

How Could You, Caroline? is a 1918 American silent comedy-drama film directed by Frederick A. Thomson, with a screenplay by Agnes Christine Johnston. It stars Bessie Love, James W. Morrison, and Dudley Hawley.

The film was shot in Charleston, South Carolina. It is presumed lost.

== Plot ==
Caroline (Love), a student at a boarding school, attends the wedding of her sister Ethel (Earle), where handsome taxi driver Reginald (Hawley) is to be her date. Reginald's taxi breaks down while giving Caroline a ride, and Caroline is late to the wedding. As punishment, she is sent to her room, but she escapes and decides to elope with Reginald, only to discover that he is married.

Later, Caroline is engaged to Bob (Morrison). Caroline disguises herself as a masked dancer at his bachelor party to see whether he truly loves her. Bob marries the masked dancer. Caroline reveals her identity, which Bob already had realized, and they are happy together.

== Cast ==
- Bessie Love as Caroline Rodgers
- James W. Morrison as Bob Worth
- Dudley Hawley as Reginald Van Allen
- Henry Hallam as Mr. Rodgers
- Edna Earle as Ethel Rodgers
- Amelia Summerville as Mrs. Rodgers

== Reception ==
A contemporaneous review called the plot "rather frail and considerably padded at the end", but praised the performances of Love and Hawley. Love's wardrobe was cited as fashionable.

Screenwriter Agnes Christine Johnston's depiction of the female lead character has been praised as efficiently creating complex female identities.
