= Barbara Castleton =

American actress

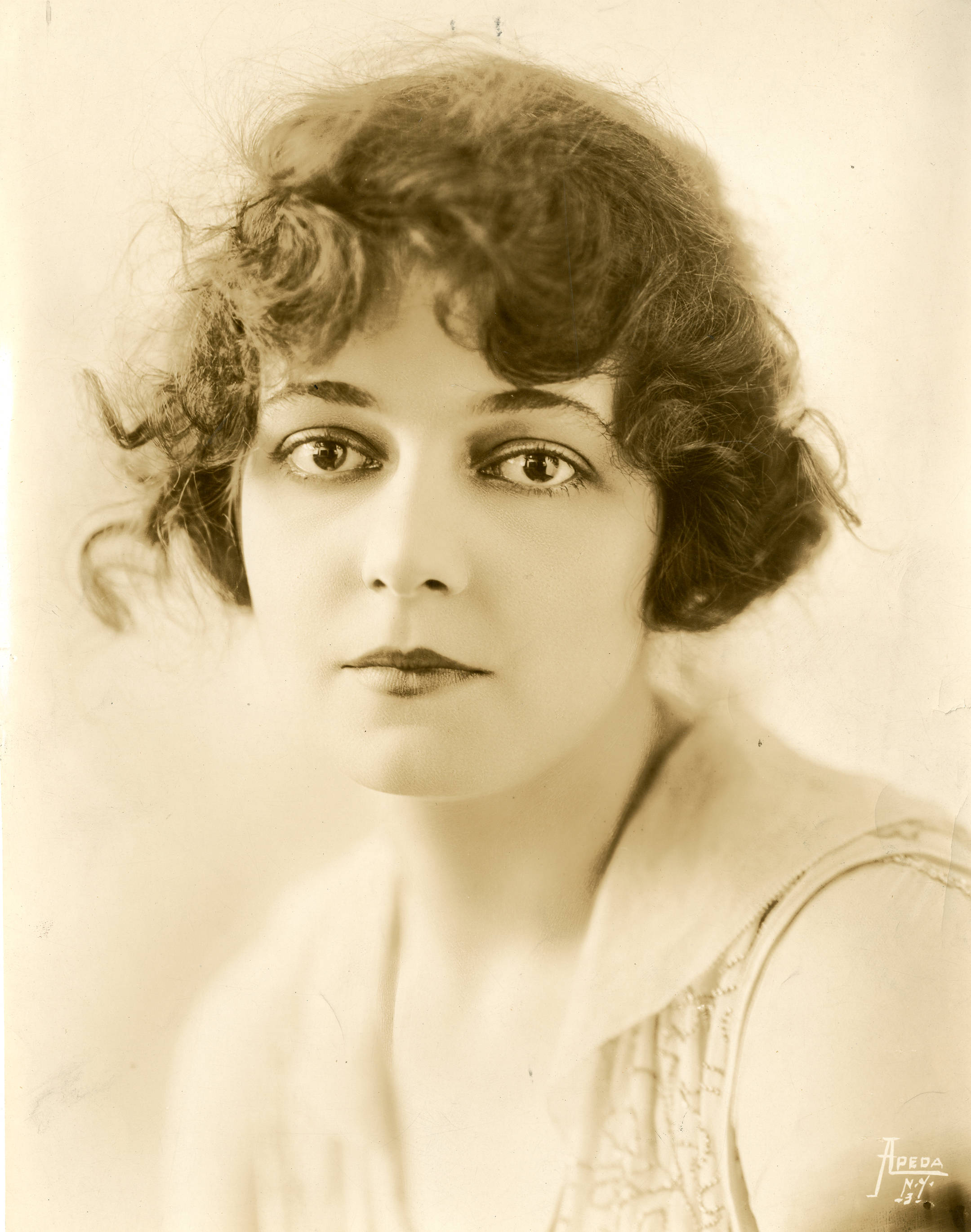
- Castleton, c. 1920
- Born: September 14, 1894; Little Rock, Arkansas, United States
- Died: December 23, 1978 (aged 84); Boca Raton, Florida, United States
- Occupation: Actress
- Years active: 1914–1923

Barbara Castleton (September 14, 1894 – December 23, 1978) was an American silent film actress. Castleton appeared in motion pictures from 1914 through 1923, accumulating 28 screen credits.

== Career ==
Born in Little Rock, Arkansas, Castleton was one of the lower echelon stars who made films for Samuel Goldwyn Studio, along with Cullen Landis, James Kirkwood, and Rowland Lee. The company's major stars were Madge Kennedy, Geraldine Farrar, Will Rogers, and Tom Moore. Her first performance as a film actress came in The Ordeal (1914). She had the lead in Branding Iron (1920), a film directed by Reginald Barker.

== Personal life and death ==
Her first husband was George W. Zimmerman, an attorney from Vancouver, British Columbia. Castleton won a divorce suit from Zimmerman in October 1921 in Reno, Nevada. She contended that he gambled and lived beyond his income. The decree was granted on grounds of cruelty.

Castleton was a collector of furniture. In March 1923, she purchased a pair of early 17th century blue velvet armchairs with Van Dyke fringe and a 17th century octagonal walnut center table with an elaborately carved base. The pieces were purchased at the Dabissi sale of fine old furniture held at the American Art Galleries in New York City.

Castleton died in Boca Raton, Florida in 1978.

== Filmography ==
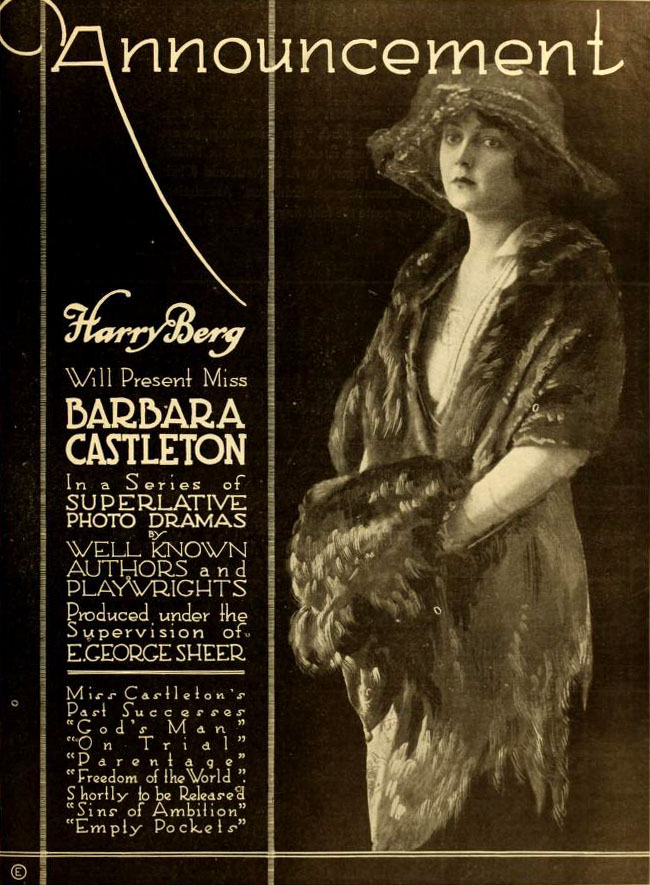
Advertisement (1917)

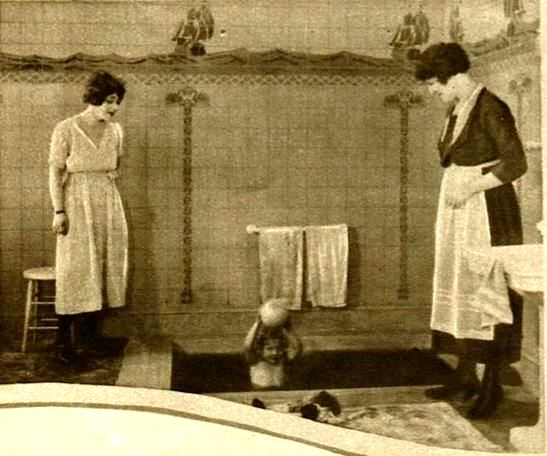
Still from The Child Thou Gavest Me (1921) with Barbara Castleton (left) and Richard Headrick as the child Bobby.

Year	Title	Role	Notes
1914	The Ordeal		Alternative title: The Mothers of Liberty
1916	A Daughter of the Gods		
1917	For the Freedom of the World	Betty Milburn	
1917	Her Good Name	Agnes Gurnee	
1917	God's Man	Bertie	
1917	On Trial	Mrs. Robert Strickland	
1917	Parentage	Agnes Melton	
1917	Sins of Ambition	Ruth Maxwell	
1918	Empty Pockets	Muriel Schuyler	
1918	Vengeance	Lady Elsie Drillingcourt	
1918	The Heart of a Girl	Betty Lansing	
1918	Heredity	Nedda Trevor, as an adult	Alternative title: The Blood of the Trevors
1918	Just Sylvia	Sylvia	
1919	Peg o' My Heart	Ethel Chicester	*first filmed version of famous play produced by Famous Players–Lasky. It was never released due to copyright conflict with J. Hartley Manners and his wife Laurette Taylor. Taylor starred in a permitted version in 1922 for Metro Pictures directed by King Vidor
1919	What Love Forgives		
1919	The Silver King		
1919	The Rough Neck	Frances	Alternative title: The Roughneck
1919	The Man Who Turned White		
1919	Dangerous Hours	May Weston	
1920	Dangerous Days	Audrey Valentine	
1920	Out of the Storm	Margaret Hill	
1920	The Branding Iron	Joan Carver	
1921	The Child Thou Gavest Me	Norma Huntley	
1922	False Fronts	Helen Baxter	
1922	What's Wrong with the Women?	Janet Lee	
1922	The Streets of New York	Lucy Bloodgood	
1922	My Friend the Devil	Anna Ryder	
1923	The Net	Allayne Norman	
