= Over the Top (1918 film) =

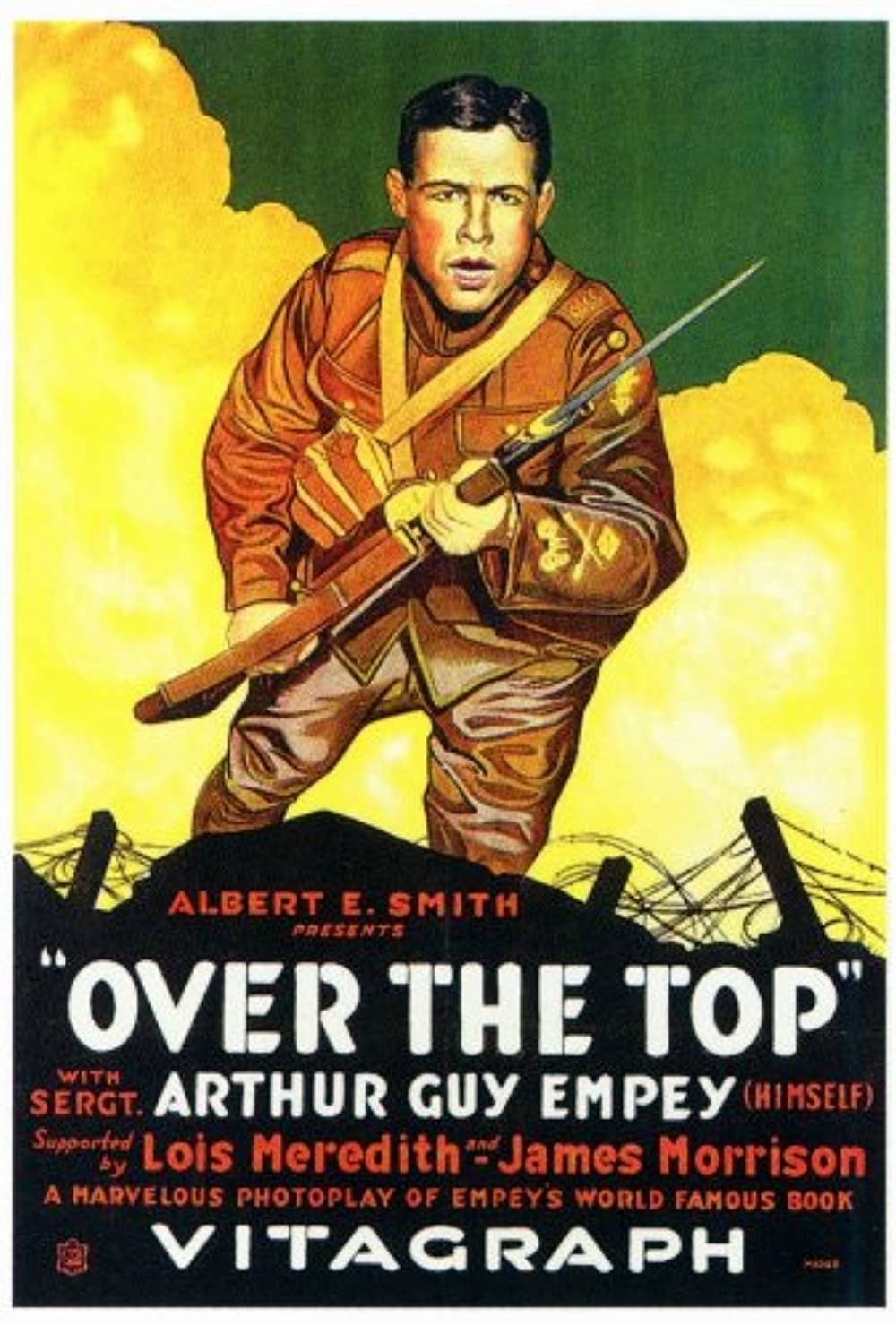
- Directed by: Wilfrid North
- Written by: Arthur Guy Empey (book); Robert Gordon Anderson
- Produced by: Albert E. Smith
- Starring: Arthur Guy Empey; Lois Meredith; James W. Morrison
- Cinematography: Tom Malloy
- Production company: Vitagraph Company of America
- Distributed by: V-L-S-E
- Release date: March 31, 1918
- Running time: 9 reels
- Country: United States
- Languages: Silent; English intertitles

Over the Top is a 1918 American silent war film directed by Wilfrid North and starring Arthur Guy Empey, Lois Meredith and James W. Morrison. The film is based on a book of the same name by Empey, detailing his service as an American volunteer with the British Army on the Western Front. Location shooting for the trench scenes took place at Camp Wheeler in Georgia.

President Woodrow Wilson attended the Washington premiere along with his wife and a number of cabinet members.

== Cast ==
- Arthur Guy Empey as Sergeant James Garrison 'Garry' Owen
- Lois Meredith as Helen Lloyd
- James W. Morrison as Albert Lloyd
- Arthur Donaldson as Friederich von Emden
- Julia Swayne Gordon as Mrs. Wagner
- Mary Maurice as Mrs. Margaret McNeal
- Betty Blythe as Madame Arnot
- Nellie Anderson as Sonia
- William Calhoun as Thomas Waldron
- William H. Stucky as Geoffry Blake

== Bibliography ==
- Jeff Menne & Christian B. Long. Film and the American Presidency. Routledge, 2015.
