= What's Wrong with the Women? =

1922 film

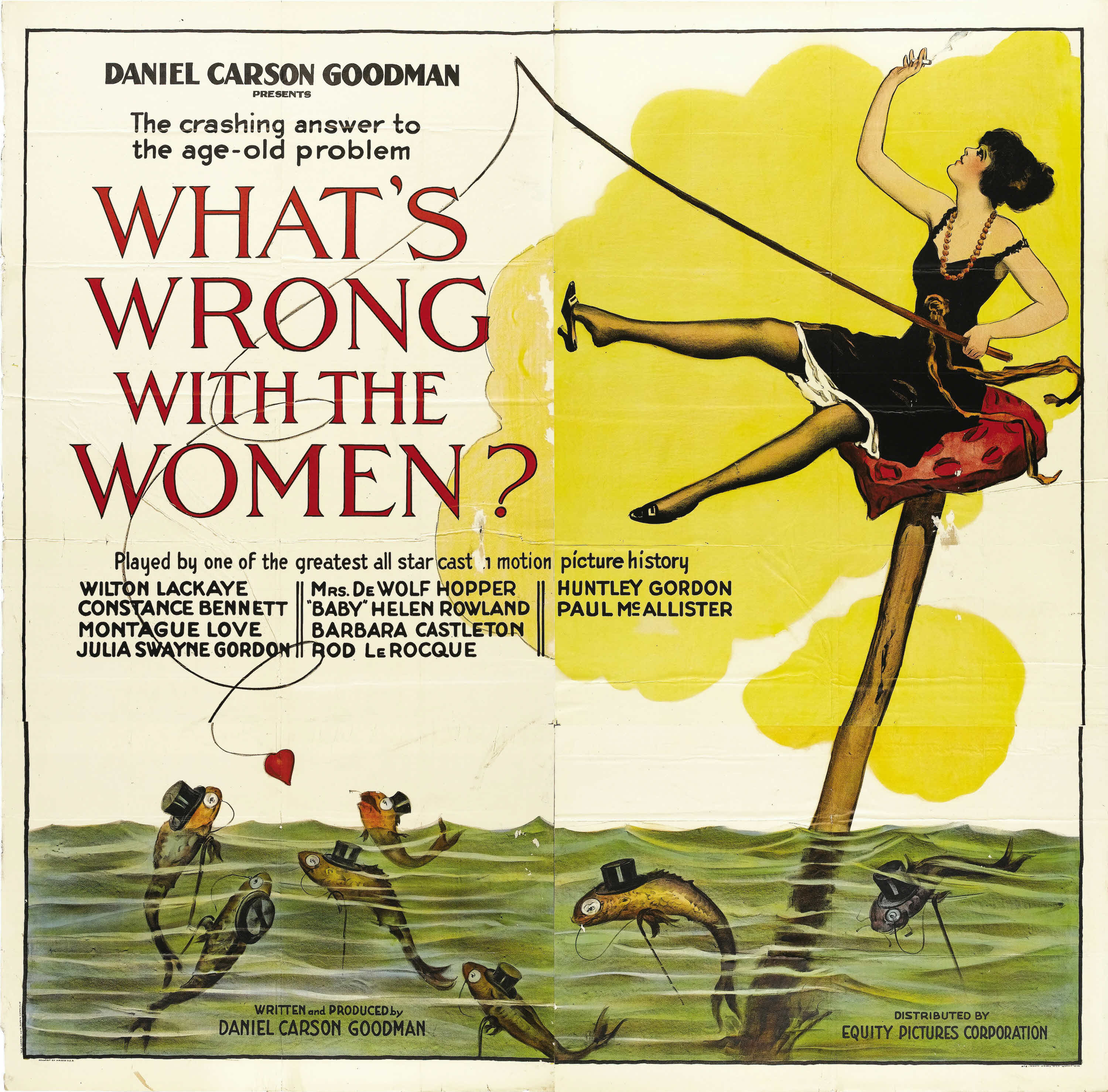
- Ttheatrical release poster
- Directed by: Roy William Neill
- Written by: Daniel Carson Goodman
- Produced by: Daniel Carson Goodman
- Starring: Wilton Lackaye; Barbara Castleton; Constance Bennett
- Cinematography: George J. Folsey
- Production company: Daniel Carson Goodman Productions
- Distributed by: Equity Pictures
- Release date: September 12, 1922
- Running time: 70 mins.
- Country: United States
- Language: Silent (English intertitles)

What's Wrong with the Women? is 1922 American silent Jazz Age drama film, directed by Roy William Neill, produced by Daniel Carson Goodman, and starring Wilton Lackaye, Barbara Castleton, and Constance Bennett. It is not known whether the film currently survives, which suggests that it is a lost film.

== Cast ==
- Wilton Lackaye as James Bascom
- Constance Bennett as Elise Bascom
- Montagu Love as Arthur Belden
- Julia Swayne Gordon as Mrs. Bascom
- Barbara Castleton as Janet Lee
- Rod La Rocque as Jack Lee
- Huntley Gordon as Loyd Watson
- Paul McAllister as John Mathews
- Mrs. Oscar Hammerstein as A Friend
- Mrs. De Wolf Hopper as Mrs. Neer (*aka Hedda Hopper)
- Helen Rowland as Baby Helen Lee
