= Xiangli Bin =

Chinese politician

- 相里斌
- Born: March 1967 (age 59); Xi'an, Shaanxi, China
- Education: University of Science and Technology of China; Northwest University
- Scientific career
- Fields: Optics
- Workplaces: Institute of Optoelectronics, Chinese Academy of Sciences (CAS)

Xiangli Bin (Chinese: 相里斌; pinyin: Xiànglǐ Bīn; born March, 1967) is a Chinese research professor at the Institute of Optoelectronics, Chinese Academy of Sciences (CAS). He has served as a vice-president of the CAS since 2016. He is a member of the Chinese Society for Optical Engineering (CSOE) and Chinese Optical Society (COS), and an academician of the CAS.

== Education ==
Xiangli was born in Xi'an, Shaanxi, China in March 1967, while his ancestral home in Wanrong County, Shanxi. He earned his bachelor's degree from the University of Science and Technology of China in July 1990, and doctor's degree from the Xi'an Institute of Optics and Precision Mechanics, Chinese Academy of Sciences (CAS) in June 1995. Then he was a postdoctoral fellow at Northwest University.

== Career ==
In February 1998, he was assigned to the Xi'an Institute of Optics and Precision Mechanics, Chinese Academy of Sciences, serving until February 2005. From March 2005 to September 2006, he successively served as deputy director and director of the Bureau of High Technology Research and Development, Chinese Academy of Sciences. In September 2006, he was promoted to become dean of Xi'an Branch of Chinese Academy of Sciences, and held that office until June 2008. He became president of Institute of Optoelectronics, Chinese Academy of Sciences in July 2008, and served until October 2013. He was director of Innovation Academy for Microsatellites, Chinese Academy of Sciences in September 2009, serving until May 2016. In 2015, he was appointed general director of Beidou Navigation Satellite System (BDS). In April 2016 he was named vice-president of Chinese Academy of Sciences (CAS).

In July 2023, Xiang Libin was appointed as a member of the Leading Party Members Group of the National Development and Reform Commission (NDRC), at vice-ministerial level. In June 2024, he became Vice Chairman of the NDRC.

He was a delegate to the 11th and 12th National People's Congress. In October 2017 he became a delegate to the 19th National Congress of the Chinese Communist Party.

== Honors and awards ==
- Fellow of the Society of Photo-Optical Instrumentation Engineers (SPIE)
- 2013 State Science and Technology Award (Second Class)
- 2015 State Science and Technology Award (Special Award)
- November 6, 2018 Science and Technology Award of the Ho Leung Ho Lee Foundation
- November 22, 2019 Member of the Chinese Academy of Sciences (CAS)
