= Ashes of Love (film) =

1918 film

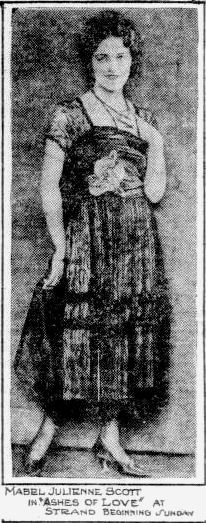
- Newspaper advertisement
- Directed by: Ivan Abramson; William Abramson (ass't)
- Written by: Ivan Abramson
- Starring: James K. Hackett; Effie Shannon
- Cinematography: Marcel Le Picard
- Production company: Graphic Film Corporation
- Distributed by: State's Rights
- Release date: August 15, 1918
- Running time: 6 reels
- Country: United States
- Language: Silent (English intertitles)

Ashes of Love is a 1918 American silent drama film directed by Ivan Abramson and starring James K. Hackett and Effie Shannon. It was distributed on the State's Rights system.

== Cast ==
- James K. Hackett as Arthur Woodridge
- Effie Shannon as Louise Mordyke
- Rubye De Remer as Ethel Woodridge
- Mabel Julienne Scott as Helen Rosedale
- Hugh Thompson as Howard Rosedale
- Paula Shay
- Dora Mills Adams
- William B. Davidson
- William Bechtel
- Thea Talbot

== Preservation status ==
Preservation of this film is conflicting. Silent era has it existing in only one reel while the Library of Congress online resource has the whole film in its collection.
