= The Sex Lure =

1916 silent banned film by Ivan Abramson

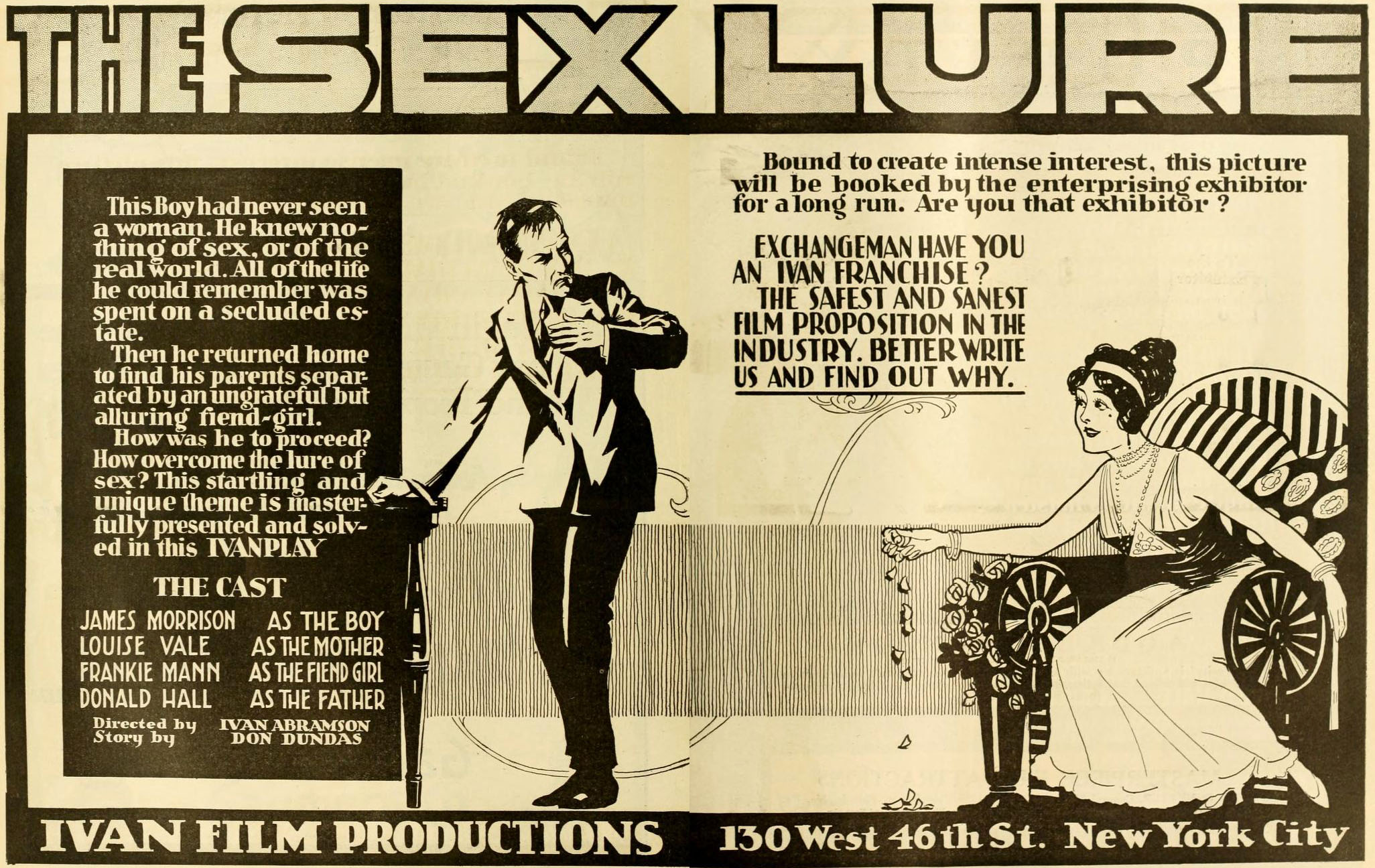
1916 advertisement for The Sex Lure

The Sex Lure is a silent film that was banned in 1916. It was directed by Ivan Abramson who was known for his titillating films. Although the film's content was not especially scandalous, the film's title and advertising were enough to incur bans of the film at a time when partial nudity was tolerated. A legal case was filed against New York's commissioner Bell over the censorship.

The plot involved an adopted daughter (played by Frankie Mann) trying to break up a marriage.
