= The Sky Ranger (1921 film) =

1921 film

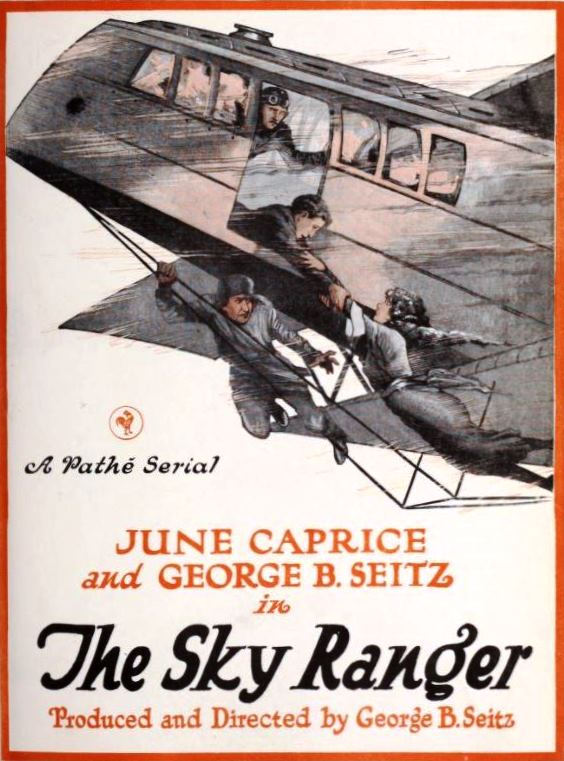
- Advertisement
- Directed by: George B. Seitz
- Written by: Frank Leon Smith (scenario)
- Produced by: George B. Seitz
- Starring: George B. Seitz; June Caprice
- Production company: George B. Seitz Productions
- Distributed by: Pathé Exchange
- Release date: May 1, 1921 (first chapter)
- Running time: 15 episodes/chapters
- Country: United States
- Language: Silent (English intertitles)

The Sky Ranger (aka The Man Who Stole the Moon) is a 1921 American 15-episode/chapter silent film serial. Directed by George B. Seitz who also starred with June Caprice, the film serial was an adventure film with locales as exotic as Tibet. The plot staple of an inventor of aviation technology having to contend with conspirators who wish to steal the invention, often appeared in aviation films. (Note: The idea of creating a "silent" or stealthy aircraft was a familiar theme in aviation films of the period, including The Silent Flier (1926), Eagle of the Night (1928) and Trapped in the Sky (1939).) The Sky Ranger is considered to be lost.

== Plot ==
George Rockwell is young and adventurous. He meets June, a beautiful young girl on the road and decides she will be his wife. But Professor Elliott, June's father, has him thrown out the door. George does not give up and saves the Professor from his cousin Murdock, who was trying to kill him. Professor Elliott has made a number of important inventions, including developing a fast, silent aircraft. His latest work concerns a new, powerful light, which is the object of those criminals who want to steal the invention.

On the day of their engagement, George and June are abducted on an aircraft which takes them to Tibet. Dr. Santro, Murdock's accomplice, is the culprit. He and his wife Tharen leave the two in the hands of angry Tibetans. The two lovers are locked into a box with only a tiny hole in it through which they can see some food that is out of their reach. As if that was not enough suffering, one of the abductors decides to shoot them through the box.

George miraculously opens the box with a rock he had picked up before. As he tries to capture two horses, June is taken away in the desert by a Tibetan. George follows the traces left by his horse and rescues June in time.

== Chapter titles ==
Lobby card for episode 3-In Hostile Hands

Lobby card for episode 6-The Crystal Prism

1. Out of the Clouds
2. The Sinister Signal
3. In Hostile Hands
4. Desert Law
5. Mid-Air
6. The Crystal Prism
7. Danger's Doorway
8. Dropped from the Clouds
9. The House on the Roof
10. Trapped
11. The Seething Pool
12. The Whirling Menace
13. At the Last Minute
14. Liquid Fire
15. The Last Raid

== Cast ==
- George B. Seitz as George Oliver Rockwell
- June Caprice as June Elliott
- Harry Semels as Dr. Santro
- Frank Redman as Professor Elliott
- Joe Cuny as Murdock
- Peggy Shanor as Tharen
- Charles "Patch" Revada as Bean
- Spencer Gordon Bennet
- Tom Goodwin as The Butler (credited as Thomas Goodwin)
- Marguerite Courtot

== Production ==
The Sky Ranger was not to be confused on the 1928 short film based on the popular "Russ Farrell" magazine stories and the film series, Russ Farrell, Aviator that stars Reed Howes as the dashing, devil-may-care flyboy hero.

== Reception ==
When The Sky Ranger was released as a film serial with the first chapter playing on May 1, 1921, a decision was made to rename the serial to The Man Who Stole the Moon. The new title was a way to market the production as more of a science fiction film, capitalizing on interest in this genre. The Man Who Stole the Moon was compared to a similar film, A Message from Mars, a 1921 American silent fantasy comedy film released by Metro Pictures on April 11, 1921.

== See also ==
- List of film serials
- List of film serials by studio
- List of lost films
