= Zalmon Libin =

American dramatist

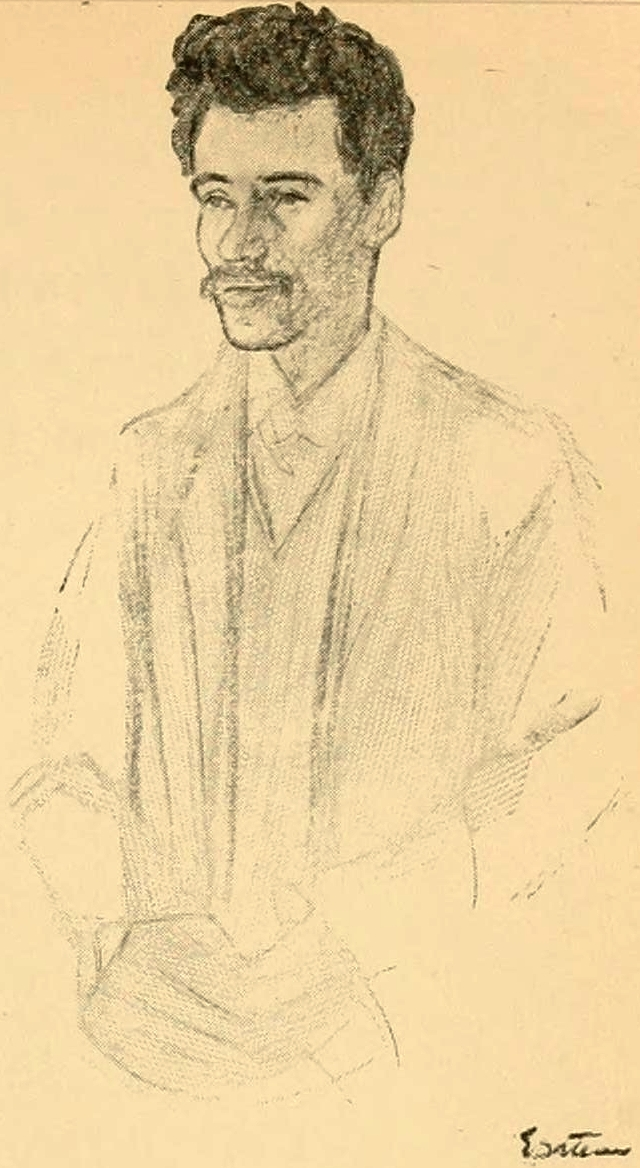
Zalmon Libin

Zalmon Libin, usually known as Z. Libin (1872-1955; real name: Yisrael-Zalman Hurvits or Gurvitz), was a writer of short stories and a playwright in Yiddish theater, active around 1900.

"The O. Henry of the East Side" [Goldberg, 1918, 688] was born in the Russian Empire and emigrated to the United States in 1892.

Sol Liptzin describes his short stories as "about Jewish proletarians, grim portraits of the anguish and tears of tenement dwellers in New York's Lower East Side..." [Liptzin, 1972,82] His plays included both tragedies and comedies. Gebrokhene Hertzer (Broken Hearts, 1903) was filmed in 1926, starring Maurice Schwartz. His play Di Groyse Frage (The Great Question) was performed at the Arch Street Theater in Philadelphia in 1916, on the subject of birth control, and starred Jacob P. Adler and Sara Adler.

Isaac Goldberg, writing in 1918, was much more impressed with Libin's stories than his plays: "Although he has been mentioned as the compromiser, on the stage, between the purely literary drama and popular trash, there is altogether too little literature in the compromise. Libin makes his living from his plays; he will live through his tales." [Goldberg, 1918, 688]
