= Ivan Abramson =

Silent film director

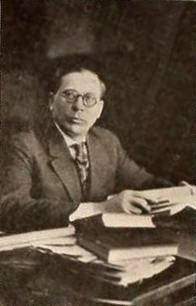
- Born: 1869; Russia
- Died: September 15, 1934 (aged 64–65); Manhattan, New York City, New York

Ivan Abramson (1869 – September 15, 1934) was a director of American silent films in the 1910s and 1920s.

Abramson emigrated to the United States from the Russian Empire in the 1880s and soon became involved in the Jewish newspaper field. In 1905, he founded an opera company. In 1914, he founded Ivan Film Productions to produce silent films, with Sins of the Parents as the first release. In 1917, after success with pictures including One Law for Both and Enlighten Thy Daughter, he partnered with William Randolph Hearst to form the Graphic Film Corporation (GFC).

Abramson's films are often melodramas with titillating titles such as Forbidden Fruit (1915) and A Child for Sale (1920), and sexual hygiene films such as The Sex Lure (1916) and Enlighten Thy Daughter (1917). Abramson often aimed to make a moral argument with his films. He stated that the intention of his films was to "point out an evil in life through one character and at the same time show the manner in which that evil might be cured through another character." The GFC ended with the 1919 release of The Echo of Youth.

In 1923, Abramson and Sidney M. Goldin directed East and West, filmed in Austria and starring Molly Picon, and which had English and Yiddish subtitles.

Abramson died on September 15, 1934, in New York's Mount Sinai Hospital, survived by his wife Liza Einhorn.

== Selected filmography ==
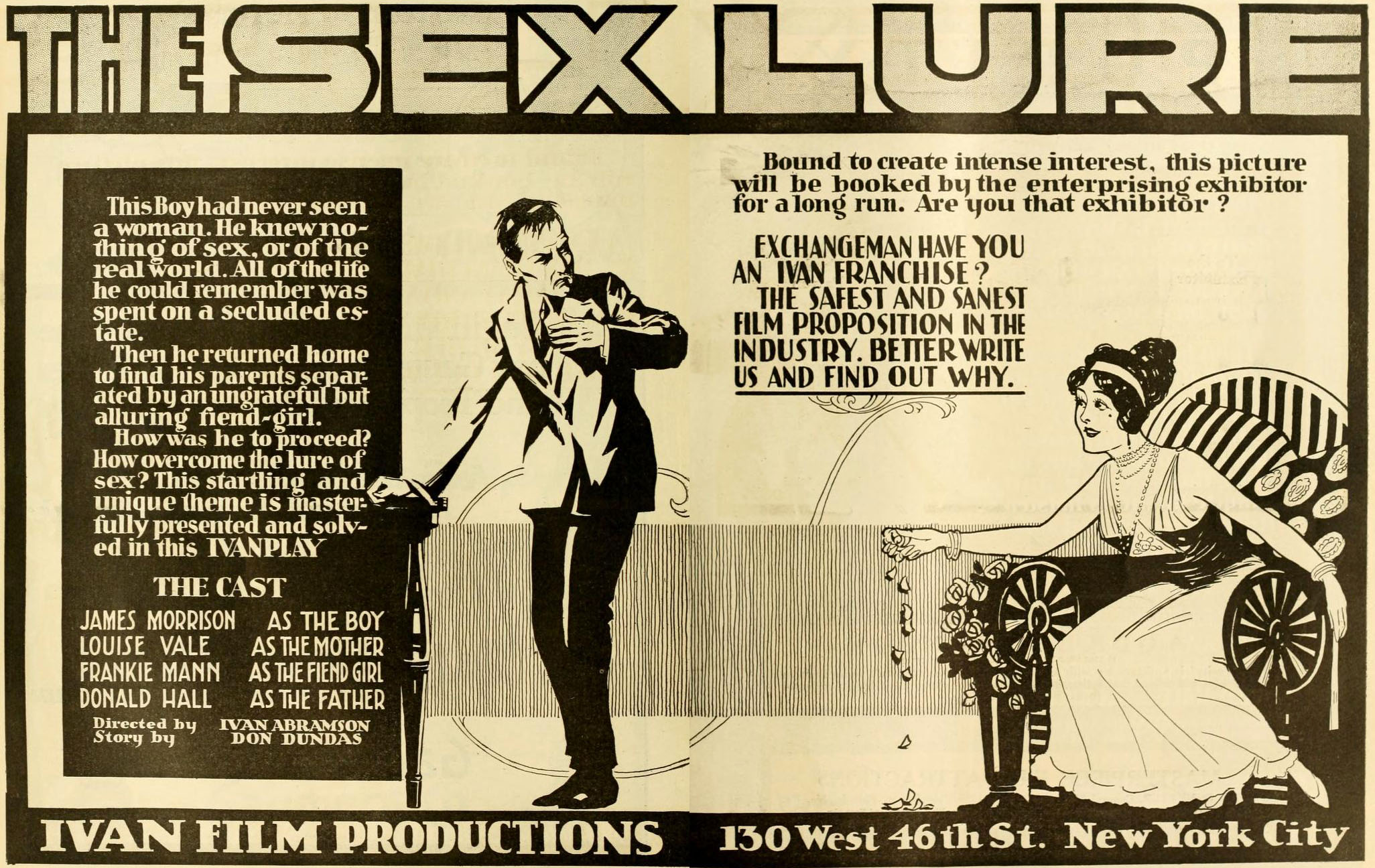
The Sex Lure (1916)

- Sins of the Parents (1914)
- Should a Woman Divorce? (writer/producer) (1914)
- A Mother's Confession (1915)
- Forbidden Fruit (1915)
- The Sex Lure (1916)
- A Fool's Paradise (1916)
- One Law for Both (1917)
- Sins of Ambition (1917)
- Married in Name Only (1917) (writer)
- Enlighten Thy Daughter (1917)
- When Men Betray (1918)
- Ashes of Love (1918)
- The Echo of Youth (1919)
- A Child for Sale (1920)
- Wildness of Youth (1922)
- East and West (1923)
- I Am the Man (1924)
- Meddling Women (1924)

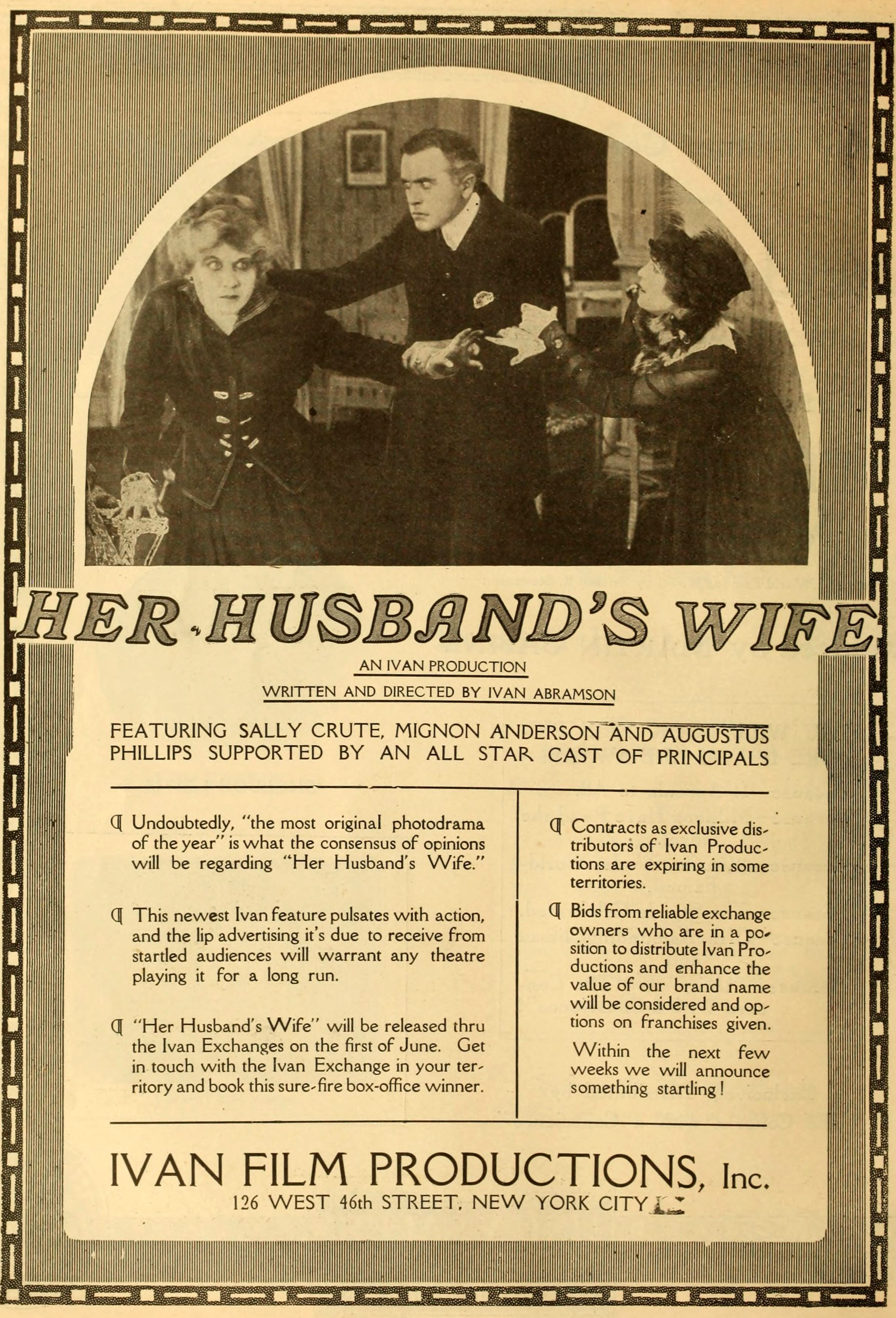
Her Husband's Wife (1916)
