= André Barlatier =

French-American cinematographer

André Barlatier was a cinematographer. He moved to the U.S. from Paris, France and had a long career in filmmaking. Neptune's Daughter was the first American film he made. Annette Kellerman starred. He shot Exclusive Rights using Panchromatic film.

He made films in India that were shown at the Rue Taibout Biograph Theatre.

In 1928 he was a member of A.S.C. and was written about in an entry touting stereoscopic film.

== Filmography ==
- Neptune's Daughter (1914)
- Extravagance (1916)
- The Black Butterfly (1916)
- The Scarlet Oath (1916)
- The Burglar (1917)
- The Argyle Case (1917)
- A Daughter of the Gods (1916)
- To-Day (1917)
- The Eleventh Commandment (1918 film)
- The Burden of Proof (1918)
- A Regular Girl (1919)
- Out of the Storm (1920)
- Darling Mine (1920)
- Earthbound (1920)
- The Kentuckians (1921)
- Without Limit (1921)
- A Dangerous Adventure (serial) (1922)
- The Miracle Makers (1923)
- The Destroying Angel (1923)
- The Girl Next Door (1923)
- The Flying Dutchman (1923)
- The Painted Flapper (1924)
- The Snob (1924 film) (1924)
- Half-A-Dollar-Bill (1924)
- The Primrose Path (1925))
- Barriers Burned Away (1925)
- Cheaper to Marry (1925)
- Lady of the Night (1925)
- Spangles (1926)
- Exit Smiling (1926)
- Exclusive Rights (1926)
- Going the Limit (1926)
- Her Honor, the Governor (1926)
- Devil's Island (1926)
- Teo Can Play (1926)
- Adam and Evil (1927 film)
- Your Wife and Mine (1927)
- On Ze Boulevard (1927)
- Tea for Three (1927)
- The Bugle Call (1927)
- The Baby Cyclone (1928)
- Beau Broadway (1928)
- The Passion Song (1928)
- A Single Man (1929)
- Borrowed Wives (1930)
- Jungle Bride (1933)
- 3 Dumb Clucks (1937)
- Termites of 1938 (1938)
- Wee Wee Monsieur (1938)
- Redhead (1941)
