= When Husbands Deceive =

1922 film

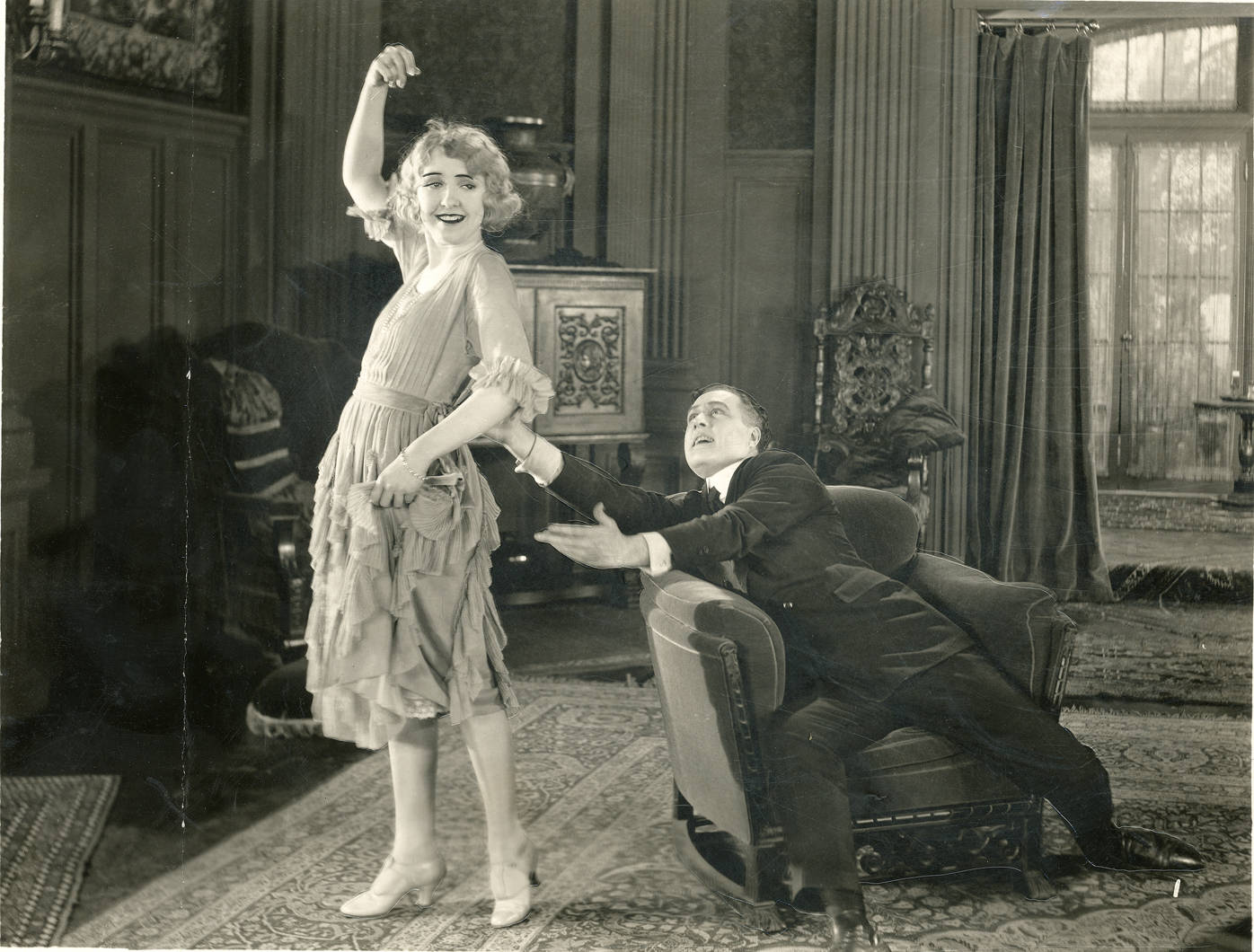
- Directed by: Wallace Worsley
- Written by: Leah Baird
- Produced by: Arthur F. Beck
- Starring: Leah Baird; William Conklin; Eulalie Jensen
- Cinematography: Charles J. Stumar
- Production company: Arthur F. Beck Serial Productions
- Distributed by: Associated Exhibitors
- Release date: August 20, 1922
- Running time: 50 minutes
- Country: United States
- Languages: Silent; English intertitles

When Husbands Deceive is a 1922 American silent drama film directed by Wallace Worsley and starring Leah Baird, William Conklin and Eulalie Jensen.

== Cast ==
- Leah Baird as Viola Baxter
- William Conklin as Marshall Walsh
- Jack Mower as Richard Fletcher
- Eulalie Jensen as Lulu Singleton
- John Cossar as Andrew Singleton

== Preservation ==
With no prints of When Husbands Deceive located in any film archives, it is considered a lost film. The film was cited by National Film Preservation Board on the Lost U.S. Silent Feature Films list in February 2021.

== Bibliography ==
- Munden, Kenneth White. The American Film Institute Catalog of Motion Pictures Produced in the United States, Part 1. University of California Press, 1997.
