= Rough Going =

1925 film

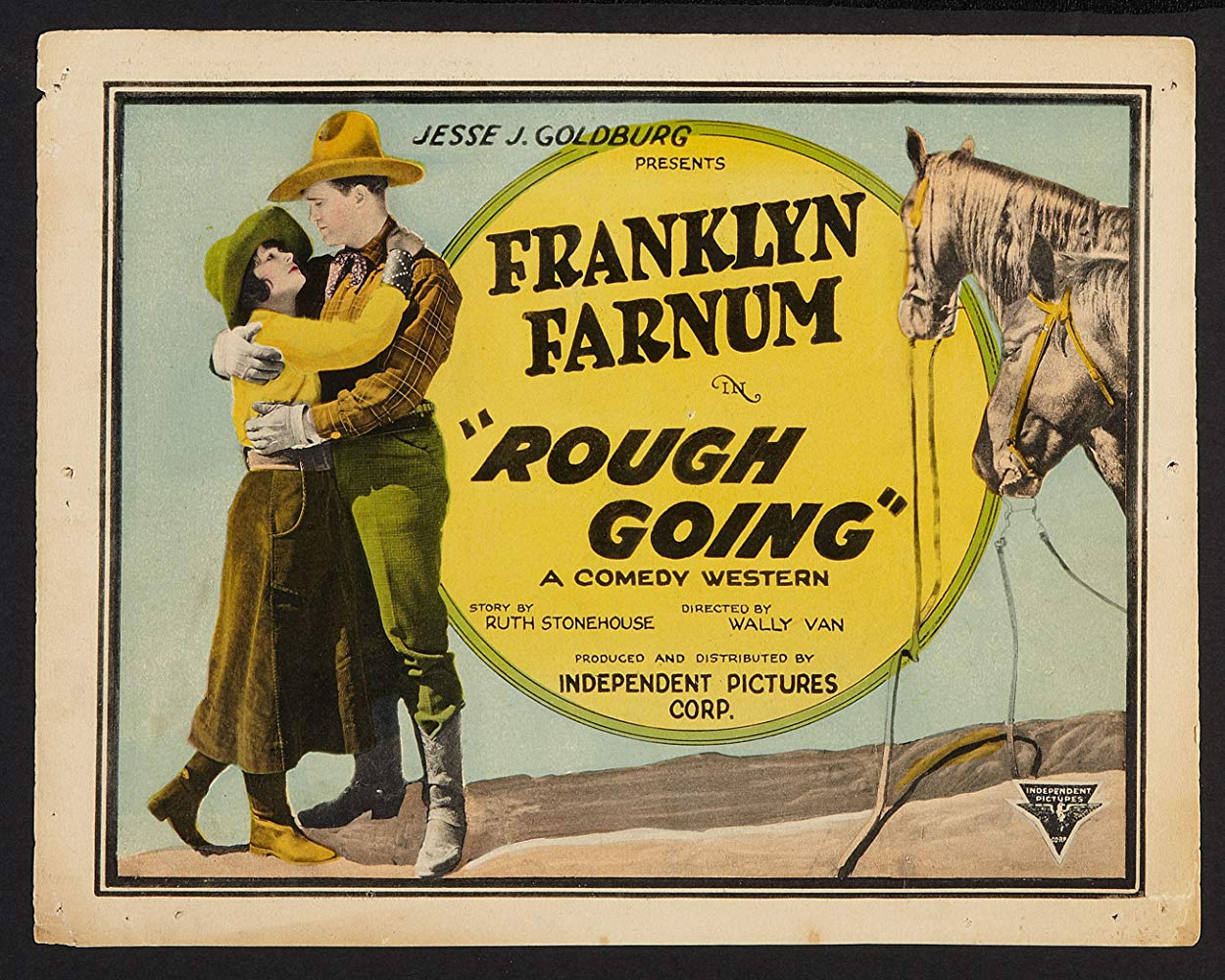
- Directed by: Wally Van
- Written by: Ruth Stonehouse
- Produced by: Independent Pictures
- Starring: Franklyn Farnum
- Cinematography: Allen Siegler
- Release date: August 16, 1925
- Running time: 50 minutes
- Country: United States
- Languages: Silent; English intertitles

Rough Going is a 1925 American silent Western film directed by Wally Van and starring Franklyn Farnum. Actress Ruth Stonehouse provided the story.

It is preserved in the Library of Congress collection and at Cinematheque Royale de Belgique, Bruxelles(Brussels).

== Cast ==
- Franklyn Farnum- Himself
- Marion Harlan - Patricia Burke
- Vester Pegg - Jim Benton
- Dora Baker - Mother Blue
- Alys Murrell - "La Rosita"
- Buck Black - Micky
