= The Drivin' Fool =

1923 film

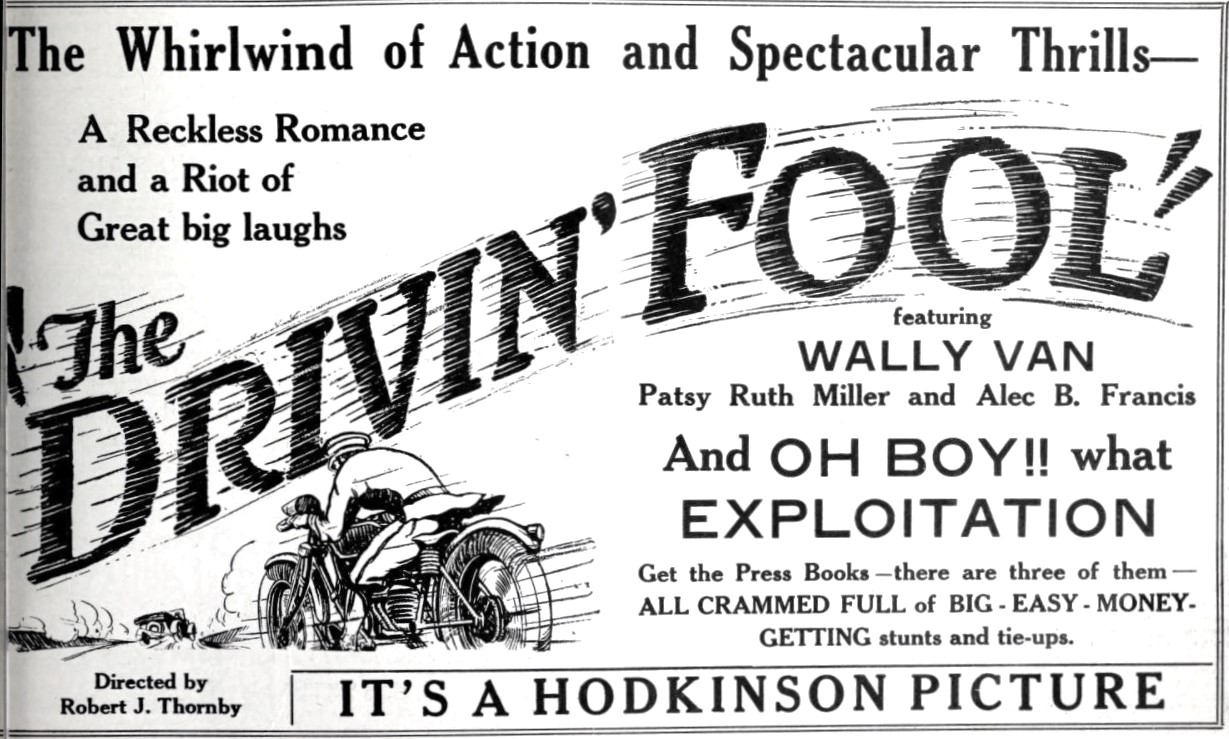
- Advertisement
- Directed by: Robert Thornby
- Written by: Walter Anthony; H.H. Van Loan
- Based on: "The Drivin' Fool" by William F. Sturm
- Starring: Wally Van; Alec B. Francis; Patsy Ruth Miller
- Cinematography: Stephen Rounds; Archie Stout
- Production company: Regent Pictures
- Distributed by: W. W. Hodkinson Corporation
- Release date: September 12, 1923
- Running time: 60 minutes
- Country: United States
- Language: Silent (English intertitles)

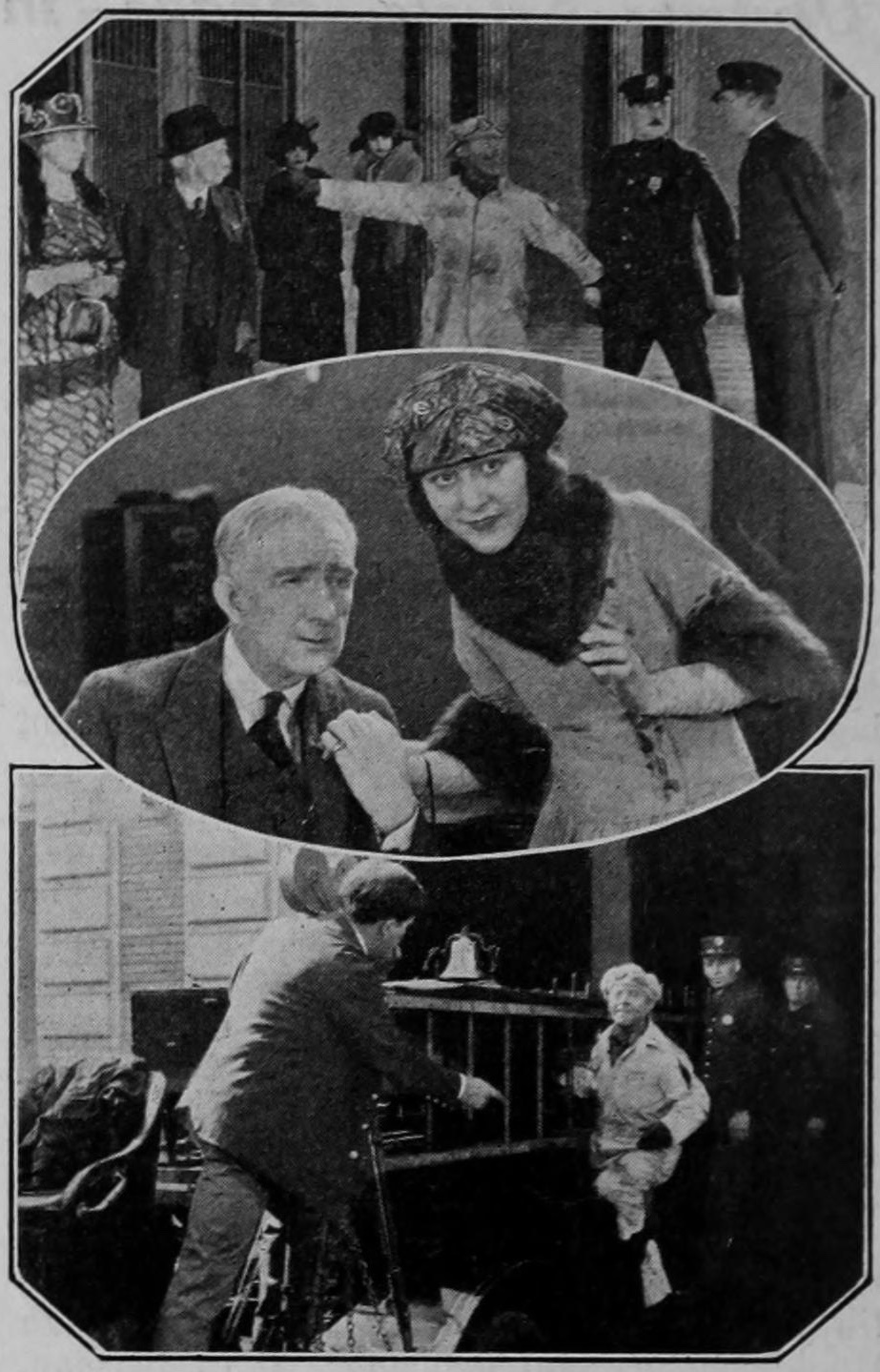
Scenes from the film

The Drivin' Fool is a 1923 American silent comedy action film directed by Robert Thornby and starring Wally Van, Alec B. Francis, and Patsy Ruth Miller.

== Cast ==
- Wally Van as Hal Locke
- Alec B. Francis as John Moorhead
- Patsy Ruth Miller as Sylvia Moorhead
- Wilton Taylor as Henry Locke
- Ramsey Wallace as Richard Browlee
- Wilfrid North as Howard Grayson
- Jessie J. Aldriche as Horatio Jackson Lee St. Albans
- Kenneth R. Bush as John Lawson

== Preservation ==
With no prints of The Drivin' Fool located in any film archives, it is a lost film.

== Bibliography ==
- Munden, Kenneth White. The American Film Institute Catalog of Motion Pictures Produced in the United States, Part 1. University of California Press, 1997.
