= Barriers Burned Away =

1925 film

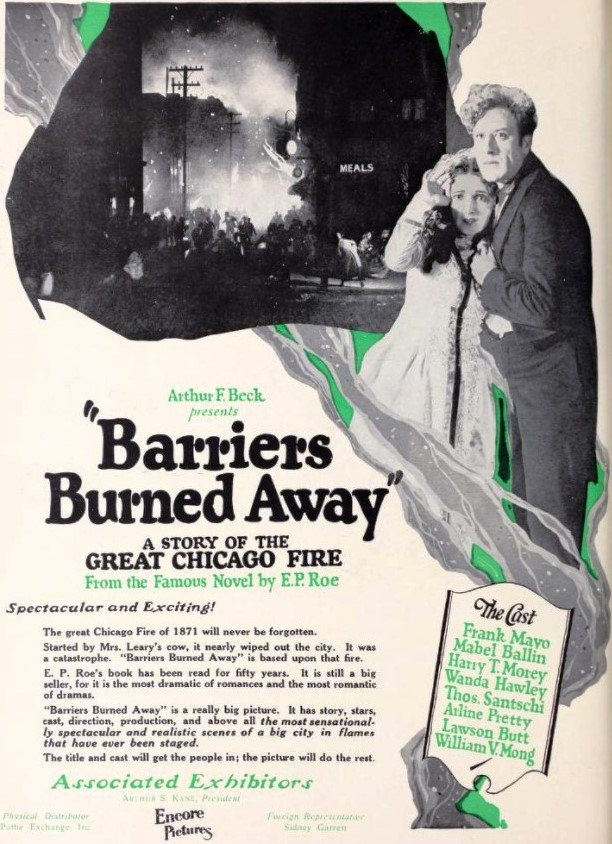
- Trade advertisement
- Directed by: W.S. Van Dyke
- Written by: Leah Baird
- Based on: Barriers Burned Away by Edward Payson Roe
- Produced by: Arthur F. Beck
- Starring: Mabel Ballin; Eric Mayne; Frank Mayo
- Cinematography: André Barlatier
- Production company: Encore Pictures
- Distributed by: Pathé Exchange
- Release date: January 4, 1925
- Running time: 70 minutes
- Country: United States
- Language: Silent (English intertitles)

Barriers Burned Away is a 1925 American silent historical drama film directed by W.S. Van Dyke and starring Mabel Ballin, Eric Mayne, and Frank Mayo. It is set at the time of the Great Chicago Fire in 1871.

The film is loosely adapted from the 1872 novel of the same name by Edward Payson Roe.

== Plot ==
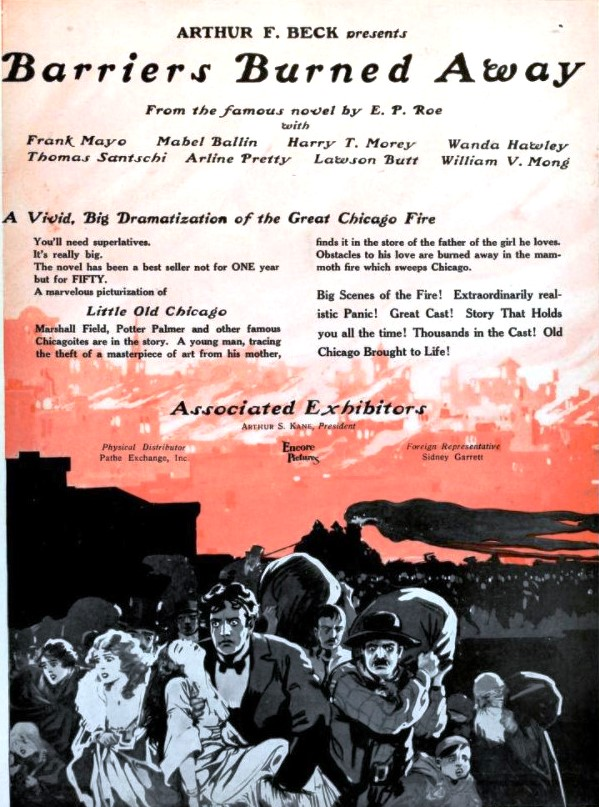
Advertising from November 30, 1924 The Film Daily

As described in a review in a film magazine, Wayne Morgan, an artist, learns from his mother that a valuable painting has been stolen. In order to track it down, he takes a job as a porter in the Randolph Art Shop. He eventually discovers the picture has been copied and denounces the copy as lacking inspiration, claiming the original. Mellon, who stole it, is sent to prison and Wayne gets his position as store manager. Christine Randolph, painter of the copy, whom Wayne falls in love with, then tells him it was all a plot to get even with him. The great Chicago fire breaks out, due to Mrs. Leary’s cow kicking over a lantern, setting fire to the barn. The whole city is destroyed, and Wayne rescues Christine who declares her real love for him.

== Cast ==
Actors	Characters
Mabel Ballin	Christine Randolph
Eric Mayne	Mark Randolph
Frank Mayo	Wayne Morgan
Wanda Hawley	Molly Winthrop
Wally Van	Gale Winthrop
Arline Pretty	Mildred McCormick
Lawson Butt	Earl of Tarnsey
Tom Santschi	Hon. Bill Cronk
Harry T. Morey	Howard Mellon
Jim Mason	Slim Edwards
J.P. Lockney	Patrick Leary
Mrs. Charles Craig	Mrs. Leary
William V. Mong	Peg-Leg Sullivan
Pat Harmon	Halstead Street Terror
Frankie Mann	Kitty

== Preservation ==
A print of Barriers Burned Away is located in the Cineteca Italiana in Milan.

== Bibliography ==
- Munden, Kenneth White. The American Film Institute Catalog of Motion Pictures Produced in the United States, Part 1. University of California Press, 1997.
