= Associated Exhibitors =

American film distribution company

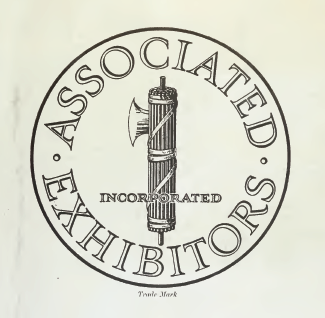
Company logo

Associated Exhibitors was an American film distribution company active during the silent era. The company did not produce its own pictures but released productions by independent producers, handling a mixture of low-budget and more prestigious films during the 1920s. Established in 1920, it had a close association with Pathe Exchange, another medium-sized American company.

During the early 1920s Associated Exhibitors was headed by president Arthur S. Kane, before leaving for Universal Pictures in 1925. During these years the number of films increased, while the quality declined. Having resisted the practice of block booking for many years, Associated Exhibitors adopted it in 1925. After being taken over by a business group, the company announced its plans to acquire a studio and begin film production under the oversight of Pat Powers, however this did not occur. In 1926 Lewis J. Selznick was appointed to manage the company following the bankruptcy of his own studio.

The company was drawn increasingly closer to Pathe Exchange, which gradually subsumed its assets. The final release to go out under the Associated Exhibitors banner was the western Bad Man's Bluff released on December 26, 1926. Pathe would itself before long be merged into the larger conglomerate RKO Pictures.

== Filmography ==
- The Riddle: Woman (1920)
- The Devil (1921)
- What Women Will Do (1921)
- A Sailor-Made Man (1921)
- The Rider of the King Log (1921)
- The Road to London (1921)
- They Shall Pay (1921)
- The Sin of Martha Queed (1921)
- Across the Divide (1921)
- Marry the Poor Girl (1921)
- Tropical Love (1921)
- The Unfoldment (1922)
- Handle with Care (1922)
- Hills of Missing Men (1922)
- Woman, Wake Up (1922)
- Don't Doubt Your Wife (1922)
- Sunshine Harbor (1922)
- Grandma's Boy (1922)
- The Real Adventure (1922)
- Silas Marner (1922)
- When the Devil Drives (1922)
- Up in the Air About Mary (1922)
- Her Majesty (1922)
- When Husbands Deceive (1922)
- Dusk to Dawn (1922)
- The Bootlegger's Daughter (1922)
- Till We Meet Again (1922)
- The Woman Who Fooled Herself (1922)
- Dr. Jack (1922)
- Breaking Home Ties (1922)
- Conquering the Woman (1922)
- The Tents of Allah (1923)
- Is Divorce a Failure? (1923)
- Alice Adams (1923)
- Stormy Seas (1923)
- The Man Between (1923)
- Destroying Angel (1923)
- Tea: With a Kick! (1923)
- Going Up (1923)
- The Miracle Makers (1923)
- The Extra Girl (1923)
- The Courtship of Miles Standish (1923)
- The Yankee Consul (1924)
- Three Miles Out (1924)
- The Greatest Love of All (1924)
- Why Get Married? (1924)
- When a Girl Loves (1924)
- The Lone Wolf (1924)
- The Spitfire (1924)
- Racing Luck (1924)
- Unseen Hands (1924)
- The New School Teacher (1924)
- The Sixth Commandment (1924)
- Never Say Die (1924)
- East of Broadway (1924)
- The Price of a Party (1924)
- Lend Me Your Husband (1924)
- Is Love Everything? (1924)
- Battling Bunyan (1924)
- Bad Company (1925)
- Introduce Me (1925)
- The Sky Raider (1925)
- The Adventurous Sex (1925)
- Headlines (1925)
- Under the Rouge (1925)
- Keep Smiling (1925)
- Manhattan Madness (1925)
- His Buddy's Wife (1925)
- Camille of the Barbary Coast (1925)
- Fifty-Fifty (1925)
- Counsel for the Defense (1925)
- The Pinch Hitter (1925)
- The Ship of Souls (1925)
- North Star (1925)
- Hearts and Fists (1926)
- The Lady from Hell (1926)
- The Nutcracker (1926)
- Shadow of the Law (1926)
- The Skyrocket (1926)
- White Mice (1926)
- Two Can Play (1926)
- The Highbinders (1926)
- The Earth Woman (1926)
- The Unfair Sex (1926)
- The Broadway Boob (1926)
- The Galloping Cowboy (1926)
- Rawhide (1926)
- The Dangerous Dub (1926)
- Twisted Triggers (1926)
- The Miracle of Life (1926)
- The Carnival Girl (1926)
- Code of the Northwest (1926)
- The Hidden Way (1926)
- The Bonanza Buckaroo (1926)
- King of the Saddle (1926)
- The Flying Mail (1926)
- Flames (1926)
- The Big Show (1926)
- The Ramblin' Galoot (1926)
- Ace of Action (1926)
- The Call of the Wilderness (1926)
- The Bandit Buster (1926)
- Bad Man's Bluff (1926)

== Bibliography ==
- Richard Lewis Ward. When the Cock Crows: A History of the Pathé Exchange. SIU Press, 2016.
