= We're Rich Again =

1934 film by William A. Seiter

- Directed by: William A. Seiter
- Written by: Alden Nash (play); Ray Harris
- Starring: Edna May Oliver; Billie Burke; Marian Nixon
- Edited by: George Crone
- Production company: RKO Radio Pictures
- Distributed by: RKO Radio Pictures
- Release date: July 13, 1934
- Running time: 71 minutes
- Country: United States
- Language: English

We're Rich Again is a 1934 American comedy-drama film directed by William A. Seiter and starring Edna May Oliver, Billie Burke, and Marian Nixon. It is based on the play And Who Will Be Clever by Alden Nash.

== Premise ==
In Santa Barbara, California, the formerly wealthy Page family tries to stave off bill collectors and repossessors for three days until Carolyn marries a rich man.

== Cast ==
- Edna May Oliver as Maude Stanley
- Billie Burke as Linda Page
- Marian Nixon as Arabella Sykes (as Marion Nixon)
- Reginald Denny as Bookington "Bookie" Wells
- Joan Marsh as Carolyn "Carrie" Page
- Buster Crabbe as Erasmus Rockwell "Erp" Pennington (as Larry "Buster" Crabbe)
- Grant Mitchell as Wilbur Page
- Gloria Shea as Victoria "Vic" Page
- Edgar Kennedy as Healy
- Otto Yamaoka as Fugi
- Lenita Lane as Charmion
- Dick Elliott as Fred Green
- Andrés de Segurola as Jose (as Andreas de Segurola)
