= Spangles (1926 film) =

1926 film

- Directed by: Frank O'Connor
- Written by: Hugh Hoffman (adaptation); Leah Baird (scenario); Walter Anthony
- Based on: Spangels by Nellie Revell
- Produced by: Carl Laemmle
- Starring: Marian Nixon
- Cinematography: Andre Barlatier (French Wikipedia)
- Distributed by: Universal Pictures
- Release date: November 7, 1926
- Running time: 58 minutes; 6 reels
- Country: United States
- Language: Silent (English intertitles)

Spangles is a 1926 American silent drama film produced and distributed by Universal Pictures. It was directed by Frank O'Connor and starred Marian Nixon, Pat O'Malley, and Hobart Bosworth.

== Plot ==
As described in a film magazine review, Robert 'Big Bill' Bowman, owner of the circus, is engaged to 'Spangles' Delancy, the pretty bareback rider, but she loves Dick Hale, a young fugitive she has shielded from the police as she believes him innocent of the murder he is accused of committing. Bowman finally gives Dick a chance in the chariot race, but rivalry from a jealous rider antagonizes Dick and spoils the race. Dick is fired and, when threatened with exposure by Bowman, he turns himself in at the nearest police station. There Dick learns that the real murderer has confessed to the crime. Dick returns to the circus lot but is threatened with lynching by a mob who think that he is responsible for the killing of Bowman, who was mysteriously murdered the previous night. It is later discovered that Bowman was killed by Sultan, the huge circus elephant. Spangles and Dick are now free to wed.

== Cast ==
- Marian Nixon as 'Spangles' Delancy
- Pat O'Malley as Dick Hale, Dick Radley
- Hobart Bosworth as Robert 'Big Bill' Bowman
- Gladys Brockwell as Mlle. Dazie
- Jay Emmett as Jack Milford
- James Conly as Biff, a Halfwit
- Grace Gordon as Davidina, the Bearded Lady
- Paul Howard as Armless Man
- Tiny Ward as Goliath, A Giant
- Charles Becker as Little Tommy Tumtack, a Dwarf
- Nellie Lane as Fat Lady
- Clarence Wertz as Rawlins
- Harry Schultz as Strong Man
- Herbert Shelly as Skeleton
- Walter Brennan as Lunch Counterman (uncredited)
- Joe Martin as Joe Martin, The Chimp (uncredited)

== Preservation ==
A print of Spangles is located at the UCLA Film & Television Archive, Library of Congress, and George Eastman Museum Motion Picture Collection, and it has been released on DVD.
