= Jungle Bride =

1933 film

- Directed by: Harry O. Hoyt; Albert H. Kelley
- Written by: Leah Baird (story and scenario)
- Produced by: Arthur F. Beck; I.E. Chadwick
- Starring: See below
- Cinematography: André Barlatier; Harry Jackson
- Edited by: Arthur Huffsmith
- Production company: Chadwick Pictures
- Distributed by: Monogram Pictures
- Release date: January 10, 1933
- Running time: 63 minutes
- Country: United States
- Language: English

Jungle Bride is a 1933 American pre-Code film directed by Harry O. Hoyt and Albert H. Kelley.

== Plot ==
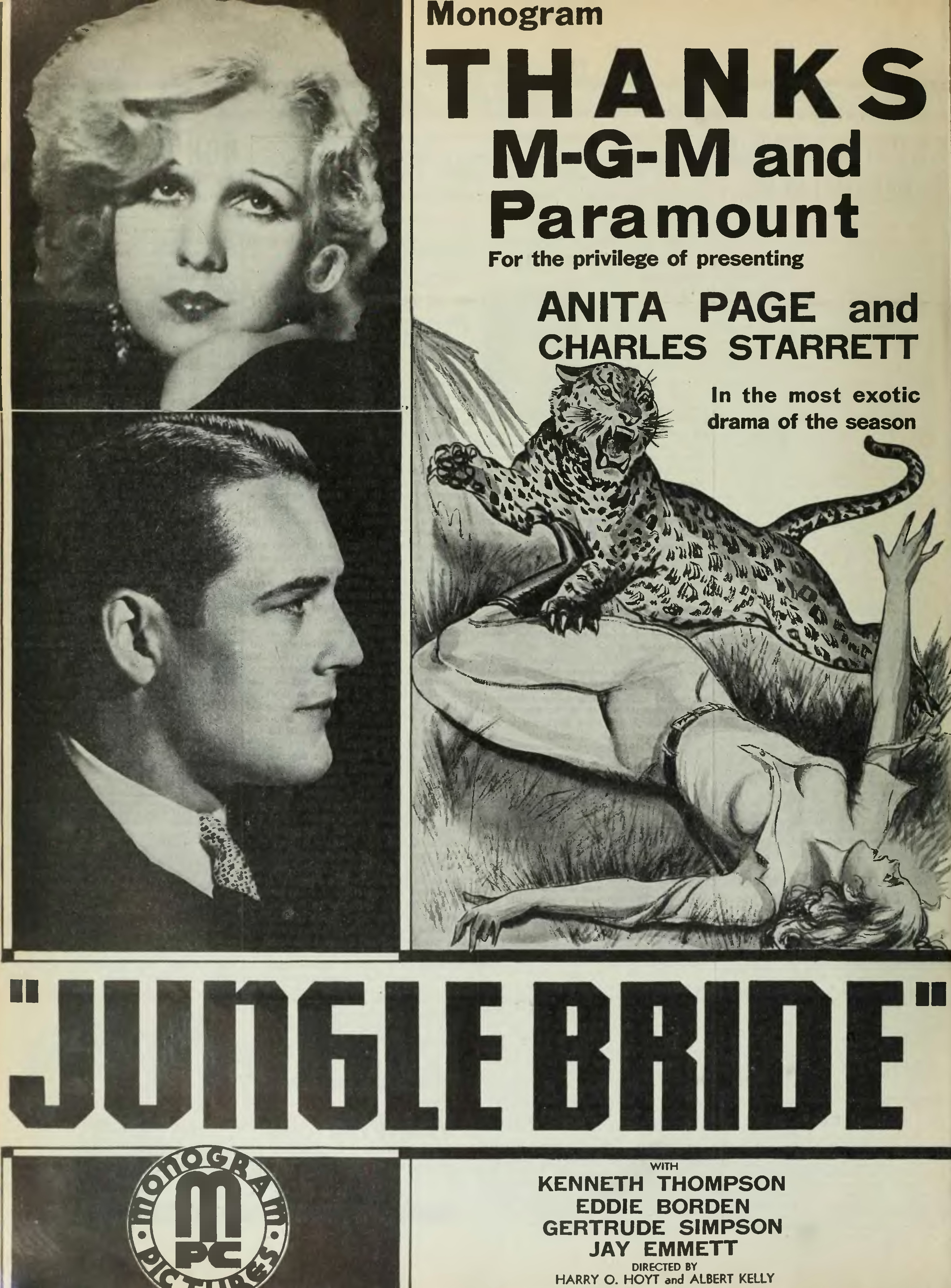
1932 ad from The Film Daily

Doris Evans suspects that an actor has committed murder, so she and her fiancé follow him aboard a ship. Following a storm, they end up shipwrecked on a tropical island with some of the other castaways. They try to cooperate on the island, even as tensions flare.

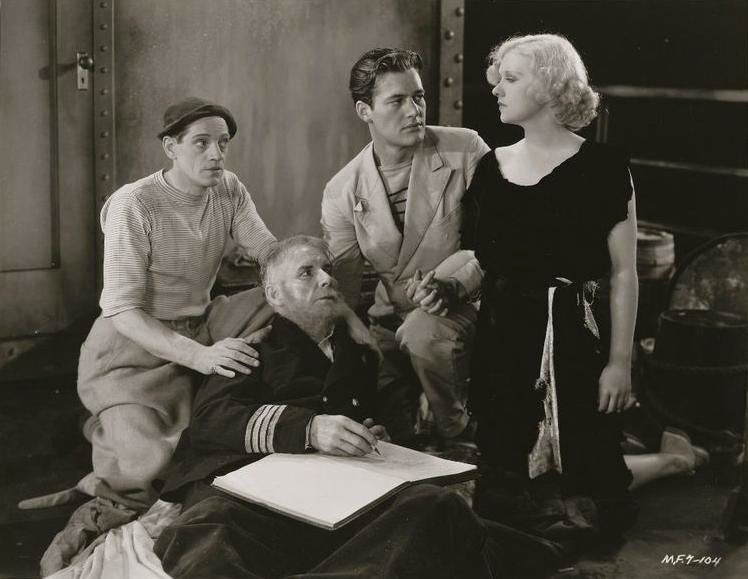
Jungle Bride, 1933

== Cast ==
- Anita Page as Doris Evans
- Charles Starrett as Gordon Wayne
- Kenneth Thomson as John Franklin
- Eddie Borden as Eddie Stevens
- Gertrude Simpson as Laura
- Jay Emmett as Jimmy
- Clarence Geldart as Capt. Andersen
