= Wally Van =

American actor

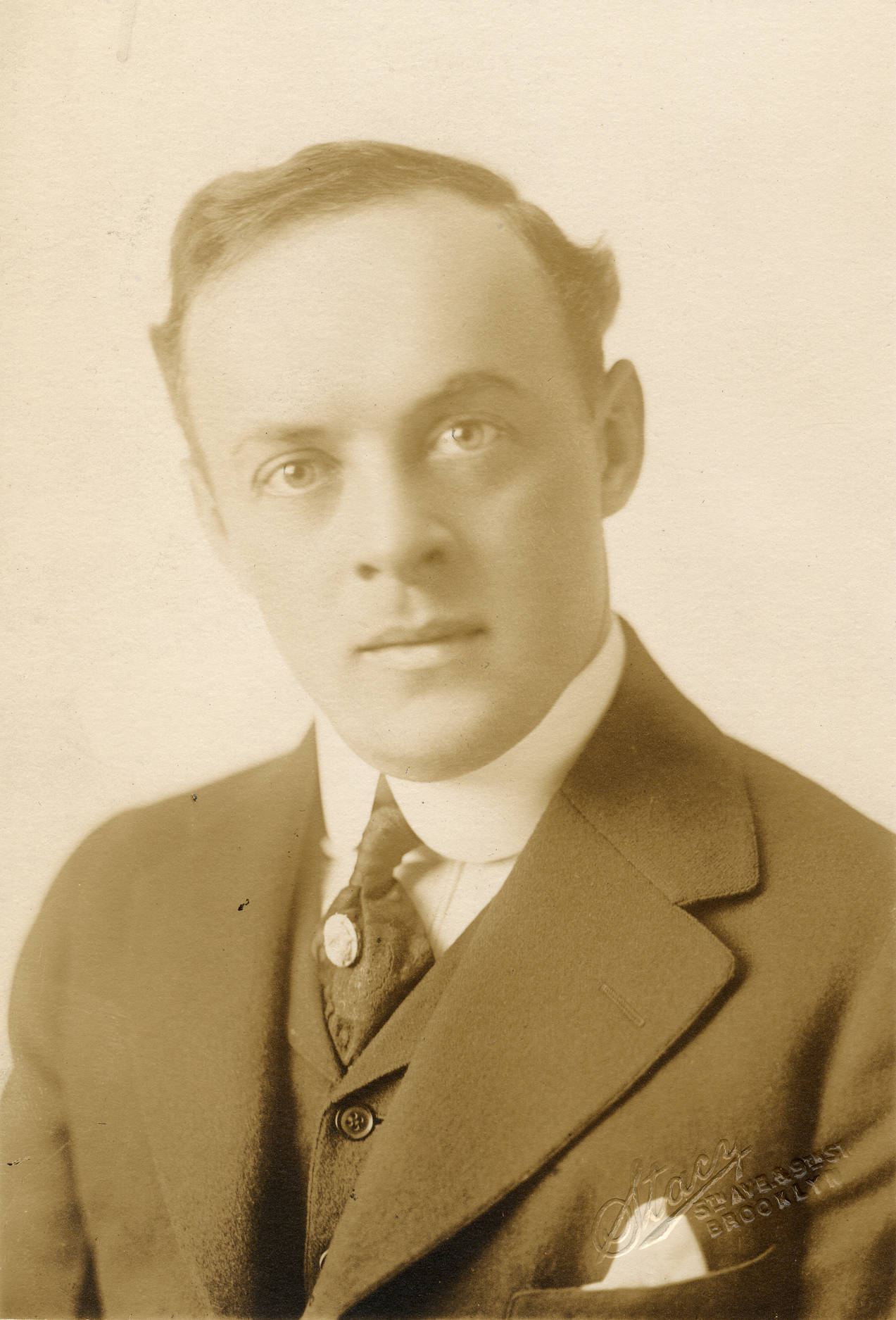
- Born: Charles Wallace Van Nostrand; September 27, 1880; New Hyde Park, New York
- Died: May 9, 1974 (aged 93); Englewood, New Jersey
- Occupations: Actor; Film director
- Years active: 1913–25
- Spouse: Anitra MacTavish

Wally Van (born Charles Wallace Van Nostrand; September 27, 1880 – May 9, 1974) was an American actor and film director of the silent era.

== Early years ==
Van was born Charles Wallace Van Nostrand on September 27, 1880, in New Hyde Park, New York. His Dutch ancestors settled in New York in 1638. His father, Charles A. Van Nostrand, worked in the United States Customs Office, Van had two sisters and a brother. After being educated in Brooklyn's public schools, he graduated from the School of Sciences in New York City.

Friends in college began calling him Wally Van. He graduated from a technical school as a civil engineer, but later he sold leather goods, then worked as an electrical engineer. As an engineer, he worked for the Brooklyn Rapid Transit Company. A job maintaining engines of speedboats owned by the president of Vitagraph Studios provided an opening for him to get into films. His engineering background also helped him to design improvements for cameras at Vitagraph.

== Film career ==
J. Stuart Blackton, founder of Vitagraph, saw Van as a natural comedian and put him in a starring role in his film debut in 1910. For 14 years thereafter, Van directed and starred in films and often wrote for them. For five years, Van was director general for the Hallmark Company, "a producing firm with 26 exchanges throughout the country".

Van appeared in 75 films between 1913 and 1925. He also directed 42 films between 1914 and 1925.

In April 1941, Van announced establishment of Royal Palms Productions in Miami, Florida, with himself as president. The company had plans to build a studio but began production in the existing duPont Building. By September 1941 he had completed the comedy Important Business, described as "a Wally-Van 'Featurette'".

== Personal life and death ==
Van was married to Anitra MacTavish, an actress in musical comedies. He died in Englewood, New Jersey.

== Selected filmography ==
- Our Wives (1913)
- The Scarlet Runner (1916)
- The Evil Eye (1920)
- East Side - West Side (1923)
- The Common Law (1923)
- Slave of Desire (1923)
- The Drivin' Fool (1923)
- Rough Going (1925)
- Barriers Burned Away (1925)
