= Leah Baird =

American actress (1883–1971)

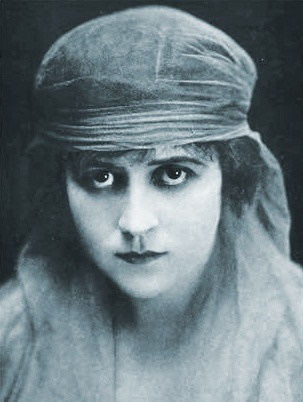
- Baird in Stars of the Photoplay, 1916
- Born: Ada Frankenstein; June 20, 1883; Chicago, Illinois, U.S.
- Died: October 3, 1971 (aged 88); Los Angeles, California, U.S.
- Resting place: Hollywood Forever Cemetery
- Years active: 1910–1957
- Spouse: Arthur F. Beck (m. 1914)

Leah Baird (born Ada Frankenstein; June 20, 1883 – October 3, 1971) was an American actress and screenwriter.

== Life ==
Baird was born in Champaign County, Illinois. on June 20, 1883, the daughter of William Frankenstein and Bertha Schreiver Frankenstein Rathjen. She had two older sisters, Augusta and Mathilda. Both her parents were alcoholics and her mother was one of the richest madams in Central Illinois.

An early star for Vitagraph Studios, Baird began her film career in 1910 in Jean and the Waif opposite Jean, the Vitagraph Dog. She played several leads in William F. Brady's troupe, opposite Douglas Fairbanks. In the late 1910s she played in 15 episodes of the serial Wolves of Kultur. Baird wrote and produced film during the 1920s.

Baird later became a screenwriter and contributed to a number of Clara Bow features. She was married to producer Arthur F. Beck.

Baird was under contract to Warner Bros. for seventeen years, where she appeared in character roles and as an extra.

== Partial filmography ==
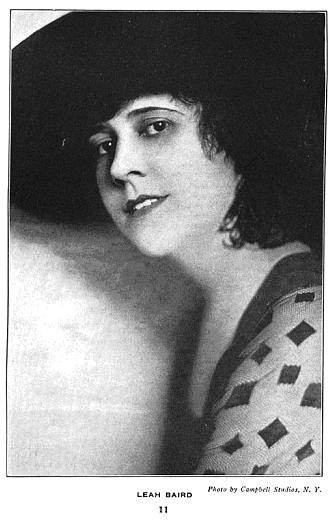
Photo from The First One Hundred Noted Men and Women of the Screen by Carolyn Lowrey pub. 1920

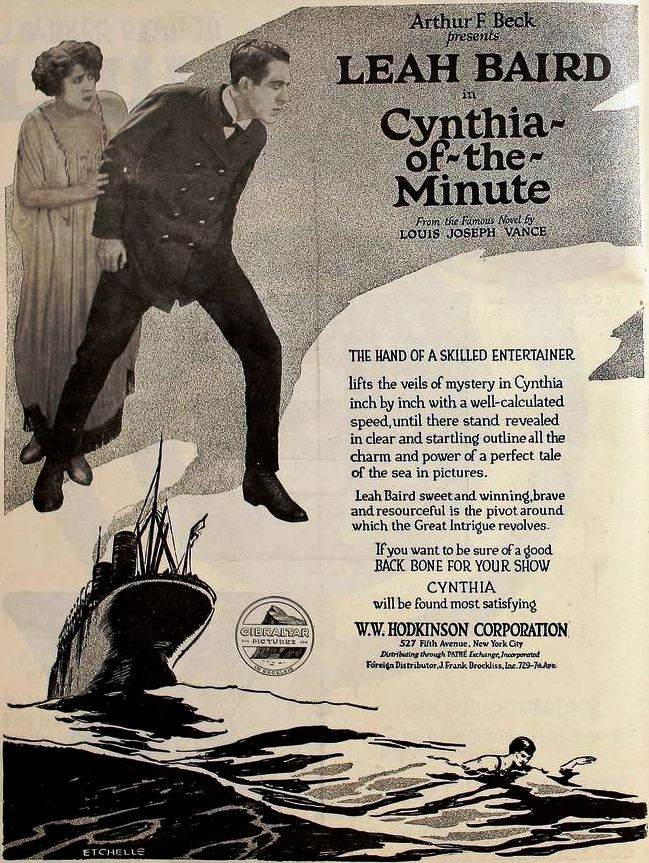
1920

=== Actress ===
- Jean and the Waif (1910, Short)
- Chumps (1912, Short) - Terpsine - the Cause
- A Cure for Pokeritis (1912, Short)
- All for a Girl (1912, Short) - Mrs. Gardner
- The Locket; or When She Was Twenty (1913)
- Red and White Roses (1913, Short) - Beth Whitney
- Hearts of the First Empire (1913, Short) - Beatrice
- Ivanhoe (1913) - Rebecca of York
- Absinthe (1914) - Madame Dumas
- Neptune's Daughter (1914) - Princess Olga
- The Man That Might Have Been (1914, Short) - Mrs. William Rudd
- Lights of New York (1916) - Yolande Cowles
- The People vs. John Doe (1916) - Woman Lawyer
- The Devil's Pay Day (1917) - Jean Haskins
- One Law for Both (1917) - Helen
- Sins of Ambition (1917) - Laurette Maxwell
- The Fringe of Society (1917) - Myra Strang
- A Sunset (1917)
- Moral Suicide (1918) - Fay Hope
- Life or Honor? (1918) - Helen West
- Wolves of Kultur (1918) - Alice Grayson
- The Echo of Youth (1919) - Olive Martin

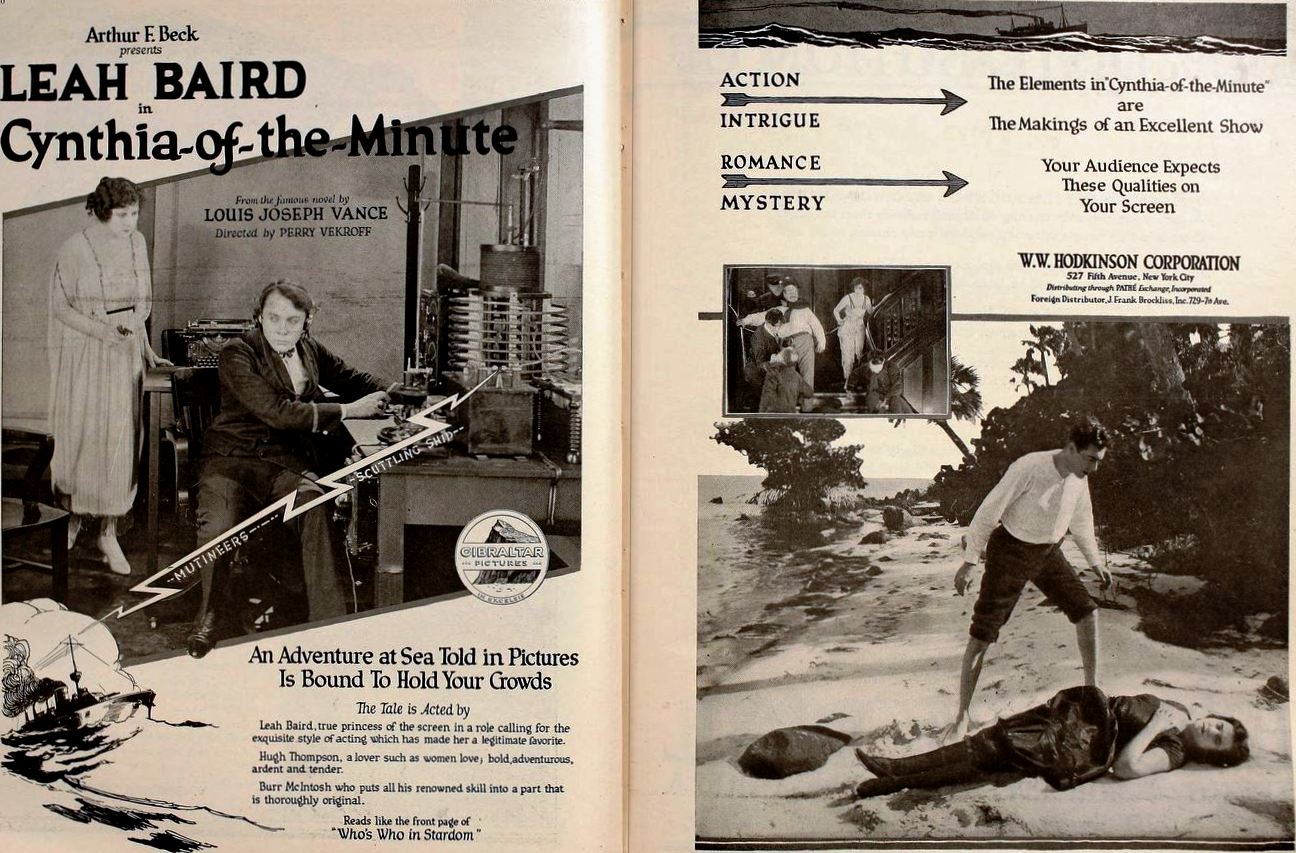

- As a Man Thinks (1919) - Elinor Clayton
- The Volcano (1919) - Ruth Carroll
- The Capitol (1919) - Margaret Kennard / Agnes Blake
- Cynthia of the Minute (1920) - Cynthia
- The Heart Line (1921) - Fancy Gray
- The Bride's Confession (1921)
- Don't Doubt Your Wife (1922) - Rose Manning
- When the Devil Drives (1922) - Blanche Mansfield
- When Husbands Deceive (1922) - Viola Baxter
- Is Divorce A Failure? (1923) - Carol Lockwood
- The Destroying Angel (1923) - Mary Miller / Saraa Law
- The Miracle Makers (1923) - Doris Mansfield
- Fangs of the Wolf (1924)
- The Unnamed Woman (1925) - Billie Norton
- Bullets for O'Hara (1941) - Police Matron
- Bad Men of Missouri (1941) - Ms. Brooks (uncredited)
- Manpower (1941) - Mrs. Taylor - Prison Matron (uncredited)
- One Foot in Heaven (1941) - Minor Role (uncredited)
- Blues in the Night (1941) - Nurse (uncredited)
- The Body Disappears (1941) - Rest Home Nurse (uncredited)
- Dangerously They Live (1941) - Fake Telephone Operator (uncredited)
- The Man Who Came to Dinner (1942) - Fan at Train Station (uncredited)
- All Through the Night (1942) - Woman (uncredited)
- Kings Row (1942) - Aunt Mamie (uncredited)
- The Male Animal (1942) - Trustee's Wife (uncredited)
- Lady Gangster (1942) - Prison Matron
- Yankee Doodle Dandy (1942) - Housekeeper (uncredited)
- The Big Shot (1942) - Mrs. Carter (uncredited)
- Secret Enemies (1942) - Hotel Maid (uncredited)
- Busses Roar (1942) - Second Old Maid
- Truck Busters (1943) - Floor Nurse (uncredited)
- Air Force (1943) - Nurse #2 (uncredited)
- Action in the North Atlantic (1943) - Mother (uncredited)
- This Is the Army (1943) - Old-Timer's Wife (uncredited)
- Watch on the Rhine (1943) - Miss Drake (uncredited)
- Thank Your Lucky Stars (1943) - Bus Passenger (uncredited)
- The Desert Song (1943) - Arab Woman (uncredited)
- The Adventures of Mark Twain (1944) - Elderly Woman (uncredited)
- Make Your Own Bed (1944) - John's Wife (uncredited)
- The Last Ride (1944) - Mrs. Bronson (uncredited)
- Pillow to Post (1945) - Sailor's Mother (uncredited)
- Mildred Pierce (1945) - Police Matron (uncredited)
- My Reputation (1946) - Minor Role (uncredited)
- Shadow of a Woman (1946) - Mrs. Calvin
- The Verdict (1946) - French Charwoman (uncredited)
- Humoresque (1946) - Professor (uncredited)
- Flaxy Martin (1949) - Tenement Resident (uncredited)
- The Girl from Jones Beach (1949) - Board Member (uncredited)
- The Man Who Cheated Himself (1950) - Police Matron (uncredited)
- How to Be Very, Very Popular (1955) - (uncredited)
- Around the World in Eighty Days (1956) - Minor Role (uncredited)
- The Phantom Stagecoach (1957) - Mrs. Simms (uncredited)
- The Hard Man (1957) - Townswoman (uncredited) (final film role)

=== Writer ===
- The Dawning (1912)
- Cynthia-Of-The-Minute (1920), scenario
- Don't Doubt Your Wife (1922), scenario
- When Husbands Deceive (1922), scenario
- When the Devil Drives (1922), scenario
- The Miracle Makers (1923), story
- The Destroying Angel (1923), scenario
- Is Divorce a Failure? (1923), scenario
- Barriers Burned Away (1925), scenario
- The Primrose Path (1925), screenplay
- The Unnamed Woman (1925), story
- Devil's Island (1926), scenario
- Spangles (1926), scenario
- Shadow of the Law (1926), scenario
- The False Alarm (1926), scenario
- The Return of Boston Blackie (1927), screenplay and continuity
- Stolen Pleasures (1927), story
- Jungle Bride (1933), story

=== Producer ===
- Cynthia of the Minute (1920)
- The Miracle Makers (1923)
- Shadow of the Law (1926)
