= Pauline Wagner =

American actress

Pauline Wagner McCourtney
- Born: Pauline Cynthia Wagner; August 18, 1910
- Died: May 2, 2014 (aged 103); La Crescenta, California, U.S.
- Occupations: Film actress, beauty pageant winner, stunt double, dancer
- Years active: 1928-1941

Pauline Cynthia Wagner (August 18, 1910 – May 2, 2014) was an American actress, dancer and glamour girl who had minor roles in the 1930s and 1940s. She made her debut in King of Jazz in 1930. She was also a founding member of the Screen Actors Guild.

Her first significant role was in College Lovers where she played Frank's girlfriend. She was Fay Wray's understudy in King Kong in 1933. She had small parts in Lady Killer and Mr. Deeds Goes to Town. She worked for Metro-Goldwyn-Mayer and RKO. Her film career ended in 1941.

== Personal life and death ==
Wagner, who had resided in Glendale, California, after retiring opened a baby store and wrote a book, she was married to Alfred J. McCourtney and died on May 2, 2014, aged 103. She was also married to assistant film director Mike Lally. They had a daughter, who died of an illness when she was seven weeks old.
