= Courage (1930 film) =

1930 film by Archie Mayo

- Directed by: Archie Mayo
- Written by: Walter Anthony based on the play by Tom Barry
- Starring: Belle Bennett; Marian Nixon; Leon Janney; Richard Tucker; Rex Bell
- Distributed by: Warner Bros. Pictures, Inc.
- Release date: May 22, 1930
- Running time: 73 Minutes
- Country: United States
- Language: English

Courage is a 1930 American pre-Code drama film directed by Archie Mayo that was produced by Warner Bros. Pictures in 1929 and released early in 1930. The movie is based on a stage play of the same name by Tom Barry which was a hit on Broadway in 1928.

== Plot ==
Mary Colbrook, the widowed mother of seven children living in Sioux City, Iowa. She moves with them to Cambridge, Massachusetts to educate her children with culture and give them every advantage.

Mary, who is unversed in financial matters, soon faces poverty for herself and her children. She takes out a loan from an unscrupulous lender, James Rudlin, who neglects to ask her for collateral. Mary is later only able to partially pay her creditors.

Muriel, Mary's eldest daughter, is shocked by her mother's actions and attempts to sacrifice herself to Rudlin to clear her mother's obligations, although she is engaged to marry a well-to-do Harvard undergraduate. A stern aunt appears and is hell bent on taking her brother's children away from their mother. The aunt manages to turn Bennett's children against their mother, with the exception of her son, Bill, who, fortuitously, inherits the fortune of a neighbouring spinster which allows Mary to be reunited with the rest of her children. Mary discovers noble qualities in Rudlin and agrees to become his future wife.

== Cast ==
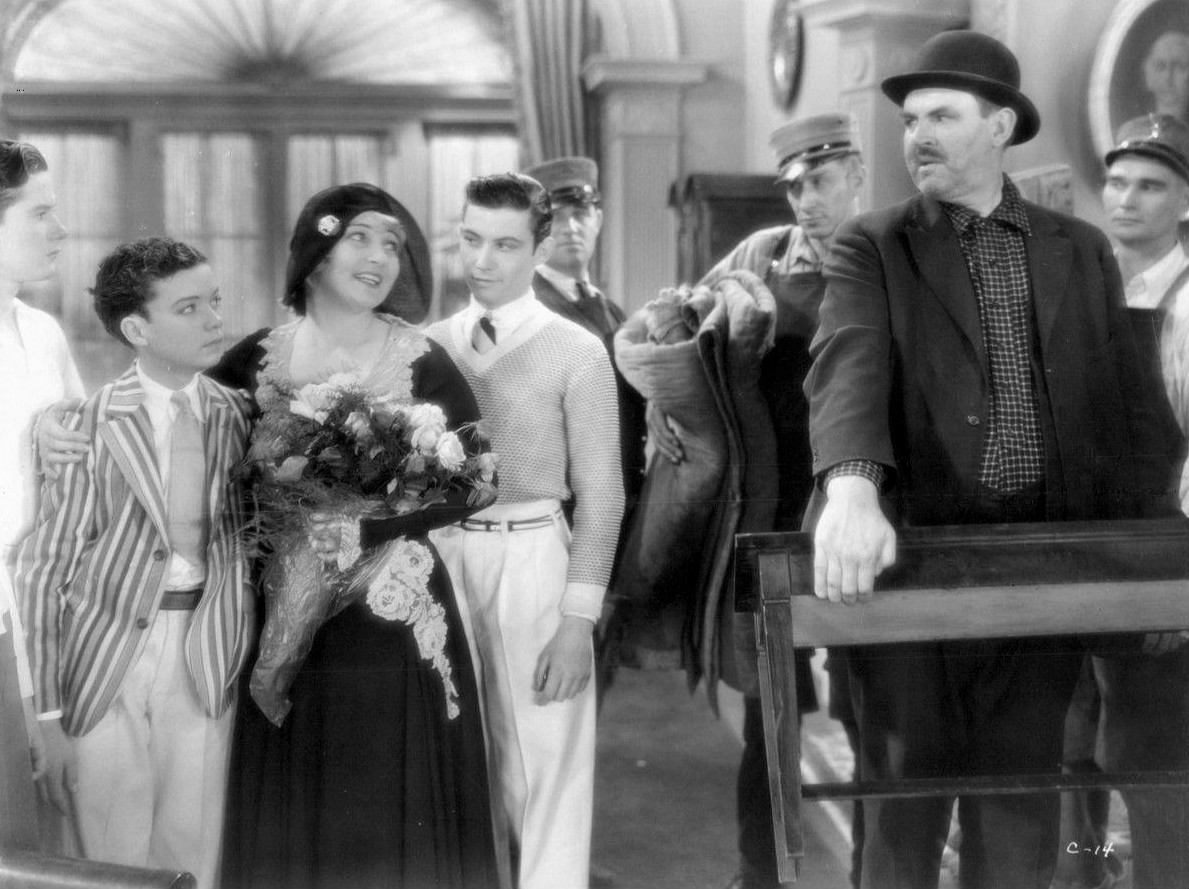
A scene from the film with Belle Bennett and Richard Tucker.

- Belle Bennett as Mary Colbrook
- Marian Nixon as Muriel Colbrook
- Rex Bell as Lynn Willard
- Richard Tucker as James Rudlin
- Leon Janney as Bill Colbrook
- Blanche Friderici as Aunt Caroline
- Charlotte Henry as Gwendolyn Colbrook
- Dorothy Ward as Gladys Colbrook
- Byron Sage as Richard Colbrook
- Don Marion as Vincent Colbrook
- Carter De Haven Jr. as Reginald Colbrook

== Preservation ==
The film is believed to be lost. No film elements, other than stills, are known to exist. The complete soundtrack, however, survives on Vitaphone disks.

== See also ==
- List of lost films
- List of early Warner Bros. talking features
