= Is Divorce a Failure? =

1923 film

Is Divorce A Failure?
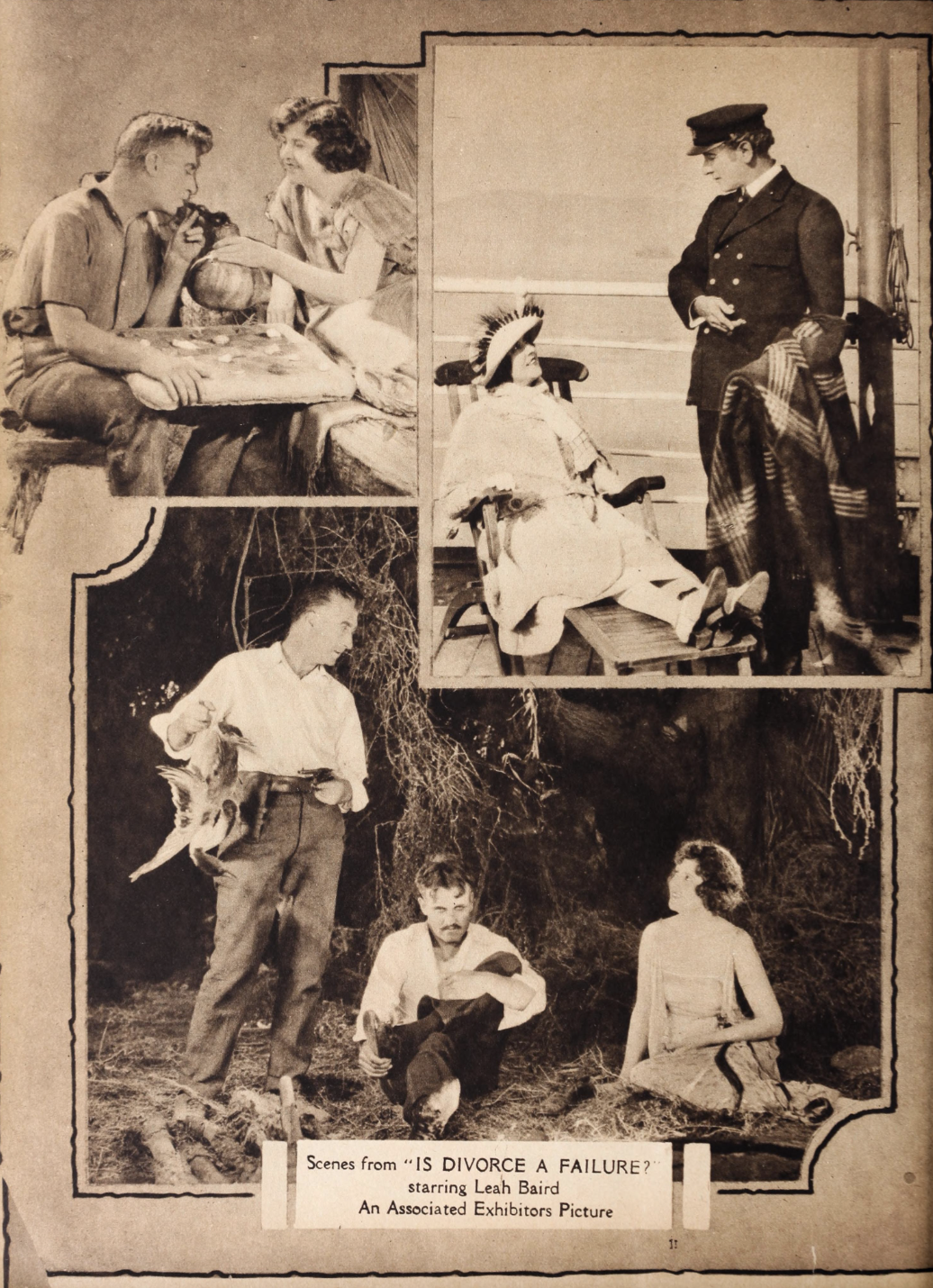
- Trade press advertisement for the film from Moving Picture World
- Directed by: Wallace Worsley
- Written by: Leah Baird (adaptation, screenplay)
- Based on: play: All Mine by Dorian Neve
- Produced by: Arthur Beck
- Starring: Leah Baird
- Cinematography: Arthur F. Beck
- Distributed by: Associated Exhibitors; Pathé Exchange
- Release date: March 16, 1923
- Running time: 6 reels
- Country: United States
- Language: Silent (English intertitles)

Is Divorce A Failure is a 1923 silent drama film written by and starring Leah Baird. Arthur Beck, Baird's husband, produced and Wallace Worsley directed.

== Cast ==
- Leah Baird - Carol Lockwood
- Richard Tucker - David Lockwood
- Walter McGrail - Kelcey Barton
- Tom Santschi - Smith
- Alec B. Francis - Philip Wilkinson

== Preservation ==
With no prints of Is Divorce A Failure? located in any film archives, it is considered a lost film.
