= The Primrose Path (1925 film) =

1925 film

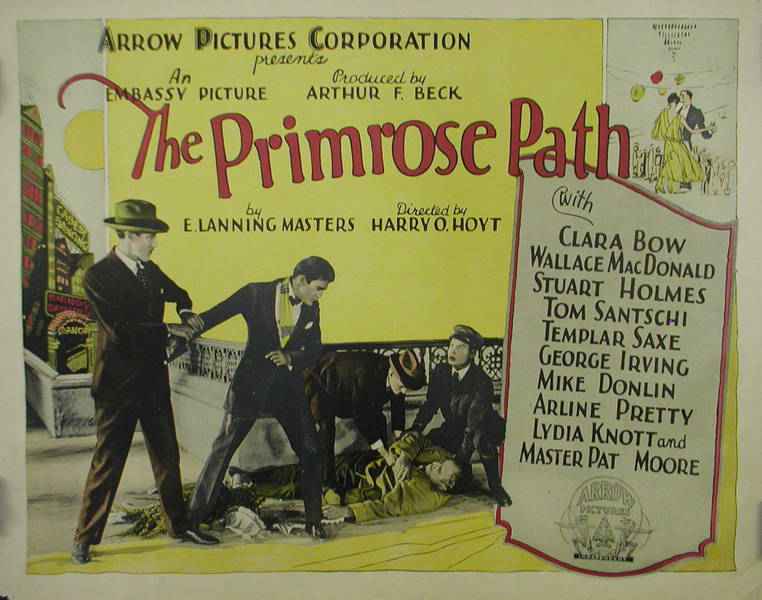
- Directed by: Harry O. Hoyt
- Written by: Leah Baird
- Produced by: Hunt Stromberg
- Starring: Wallace MacDonald; Clara Bow; Arline Pretty
- Cinematography: André Barlatier
- Production company: Arrow Film Corporation
- Distributed by: Arrow Film Corporation
- Release date: September 15, 1925
- Running time: 60 minutes
- Country: United States
- Languages: Silent; English intertitles

The Primrose Path is a 1925 American silent drama film directed by Harry O. Hoyt and starring Wallace MacDonald, Clara Bow and Arline Pretty.

== Plot ==
Bruce Armstrong, a young man with a history of drinking and gambling ills, agrees to be part of a diamond-smuggling operation in order to pay off his debts to Tom Canfield, a corrupt Broadway producer. Armstrong completes his task, but he kills another conspirator, Big Joe Snead, in a fight after the diamonds are taken by a third conspirator, Dude Talbot. Shortly before Armstrong is to die in the electric chair, Talbot confesses to the police that he had pilfered the diamonds, that Snead was a ruthless killer, and that Armstrong certainly killed Snead in self-defense.

== Cast ==
- Wallace MacDonald as Bruce Armstrong
- Clara Bow as Marilyn Merrill
- Arline Pretty as Helen
- Stuart Holmes as Tom Canfield
- Pat Moore as Jimmy Armstrong
- Tom Santschi as Big Joe Snead
- Lydia Knott as Mrs. Armstrong
- Templar Saxe as Dude Talbot
- Mike Donlin as Federal Officer Parker
- Henry Hall as Court Officer
- George Irving as Prosecutor John Morton

== Preservation ==
Complete prints of The Primrose Path are held by the Cinematheque Royale de Belgique in Brussels, the BFI in London, the George Eastman Museum in Rochester and the UCLA Film and Television Archive in Los Angeles.

== Bibliography ==
- Munden, Kenneth White. The American Film Institute Catalog of Motion Pictures Produced in the United States, Part 1. University of California Press, 1997.
