= Marian Nixon =

American actress (1904–1983)

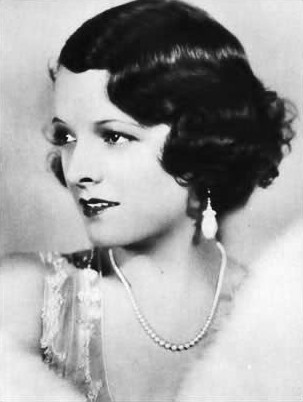
- Nixon in Photoplay, 1930
- Born: Marja Nissinen; October 20, 1904; Superior, Wisconsin, U.S.
- Died: February 13, 1983 (aged 78); Los Angeles, California, U.S.
- Other name: Marion Nixon
- Occupations: Actress; vaudevillian; dancer
- Years active: 1922–1936
- Spouses: Joseph Benjamin (m. 1925; div. 1927) Edward Hillman, Jr. (m. 1929; div. 1933) William A. Seiter (m. 1934; died 1964) Ben Lyon (m. 1972; died 1979)
- Children: 4
- Relatives: Ted Griffin (grandson); Barbara Lyon (stepdaughter)

Marian Nixon (born Marja Nissinen; October 20, 1904 – February 13, 1983) was an American film actress. Sometimes credited as Marion Nixon, she appeared in more than 70 films.

== Career ==
Born in Superior, Wisconsin, in 1904, to parents of Finnish descent, Nixon began her career as a teen dancing in choruses in vaudeville. She began appearing in bit part in films in 1922 and landed her first substantial role in the 1923 film Cupid's Fireman opposite Buck Jones. The following year, she was named a WAMPAS Baby Star. Nixon continued to work steadily throughout the mid to late 1920s appearing in Riders of the Purple Sage (1925), Hands Up! (1926), and The Chinese Parrot (1927). In 1929, she made her talkie debut as the lead in Geraldine. Later that same year, Nixon appeared opposite Al Jolson in Say It with Songs followed by General Crack in 1930. In 1931, Nixon's Beauty Arts Institute moved into the Equitable Building of Hollywood; Nixon was president of the company.

In 1932, she starred as Rebecca in the film adaption of Rebecca of Sunnybrook Farm with Ralph Bellamy. Following the release of Rebecca, Nixon co-starred in Winner Take All with James Cagney. The next year she had a supporting role in John Ford's Pilgrimage. In 1934, Nixon attempted to change her wholesome image with a role in the comedy We're Rich Again. The film was not a success and, after appearing in eight more films, Nixon retired from acting in 1936. She made her last film, Captain Calamity, at the age of 32.

== Personal life ==
Nixon was married four times. She married boxer Joseph Benjamin in 1925, but they divorced two years later. Then, on August 11, 1929, Nixon married Chicago department store heir Edward Hillman Jr. at his parents' home. That union ended in 1933. The following year, Nixon wed director William A. Seiter with whom she had worked on the film We're Rich Again. Their marriage lasted until Seiter's death in 1964 and produced three children: Christopher Seiter, Selena, and Jessica. Finally, on April 1, 1972, in Los Angeles, she married actor/producer Ben Lyon, although her obituary in the Chicago Tribune reports that she married Lyon in 1971.

Her grandsons are the screenwriters Ted Griffin and Nicholas Griffin, the sons of a daughter Nixon had with husband William Seiter.

== Death ==
Nixon died at Cedars-Sinai Medical Center of complications following open heart surgery on February 13, 1983, and is buried at Forest Lawn Memorial Park, Glendale, California.

== Recognition ==
For her contribution to the motion picture industry, Nixon has a star on the Hollywood Walk of Fame at 1724 Vine Street in Los Angeles, California. It was dedicated on February 8, 1960.

== Filmography ==
Year	Title	Role	Notes
1923	Rosita	Undetermined Bit Role	Uncredited
1923	The Shriek of Araby	Minor Role	Uncredited
1923	Big Dan	Dora Allen	
1923	Cupid's Fireman	Agnes Evans	Lost film
1924	The Vagabond Trail	Lou Macon	Lost film
1924	The Circus Cowboy	Bird Taylor	Lost film
1924	Just Off Broadway	Jean Lawrence	Lost film
1924	The Last of the Duanes	Ruth	
1925	The Hurricane Kid	Joan Langdon	Credited as Marion Nixon
1925	Durand of the Bad Lands	Molly Gore	Lost film
1925	Riders of the Purple Sage	Bess Erne	
1925	The Saddle Hawk	Rena Newhall	Lost film
1925	I'll Show You the Town	Hazel Deeming	
1925	Let 'er Buck	Jacqueline McCall	Credited as Marion Nixon; Lost film
1925	Where Was I?	Alicia Stone	
1925	The Sporting Life	Nora Cavanaugh	
1926	Hands Up!	Mae	preserved by the U.S. Library of Congress
1926	What Happened to Jones	Lucille Bigbee	
1926	Rolling Home	Phyllis	Lost film
1926	Devil's Island	Rose Marie	
1926	Spangles	Spangles Delancy	
1927	Heroes of the Night	Mary Allen	
1927	Down the Stretch	Katie Kelly	
1927	Out All Night	Molly O'Day	Lost film
1927	The Chinese Parrot	Sally Phillmore	Lost film
1927	Taxi! Taxi!	Rose Zimmerman	
1927	The Auctioneer	Ruth Levi	Lost film
1928	The Fourflusher	June Allen	
1928	Out of the Ruins	Yvonne Gilbert	Lost film
1928	How to Handle Women	Beatrice Fairbanks	Lost film
1928	Jazz Mad	Elsa Hausmann	
1928	Red Lips	Cynthia Day	Lost film
1929	The Rainbow Man	Mary Lane	
1929	In the Headlines	Anna Lou Anderson	Lost film
1929	Young Nowheres	Annie Jackson	Lost film
1929	Geraldine	Geraldine	
1929	Man, Woman and Wife	Bella Rogers / Helen Brandon	
1929	Silks and Saddles	Lucy Calhoun	
1929	The Red Sword	Vera	Lost film
1929	Say It with Songs	Katherine Lane	
1929	Show of Shows	Performer	
1929	General Crack	Archduchess Maria Luisa	Silent version extant, sound version lost
1930	Scarlet Pages	Nora Mason	
1930	Ex-Flame	Lady Catherine	Lost film
1930	The Pay-Off	Annabelle	
1930	The Lash	Dona Dolores Delfino	
1930	Courage	Muriel Colbrook	Lost film
1930	College Lovers	Madge Hutton	Lost film
1931	Sweepstakes	Babe Ellis	
1931	Women Go on Forever	Betty	Lost film
1931	A Private Scandal	Mary Gate	
1932	Charlie Chan's Chance	Shirley Marlowe	
1932	After Tomorrow	Sidney Taylor	
1932	Winner Take All	Peggy Harmon	
1932	Amateur Daddy	Sally Smith	
1932	Too Busy to Work	Rose	
1932	Madison Square Garden	Bee	
1932	Rebecca of Sunnybrook Farm	Rebecca	
1933	Best of Enemies	Lena Schneider	
1933	Chance at Heaven	Glory Franklyn	Credited as Marion Nixon
1933	Face in the Sky	Madge	
1933	Doctor Bull	May Tupping	
1933	Pilgrimage	Mary Saunders	
1934	Strictly Dynamite	Sylvia Montgomery	
1934	We're Rich Again	Arabella Sykes	
1934	By Your Leave	Andree	
1934	Embarrassing Moments	Jane	
1934	Once to Every Bachelor	Natalie Stuart	
1934	The Line-Up	Peggy Arnold	
1935	Sweepstake Annie	Annie Foster	Alternative title: Annie Doesn't Live Here Anymore
1936	Tango	Treasure McGuire	
1936	The Drag-Net	Katherine 'Kit' van Buren	
1936	The Reckless Way	Helen Rogers	
1936	Captain Calamity	Madge Lewis	
