= Richard Tucker (actor) =

American actor (1884–1942)

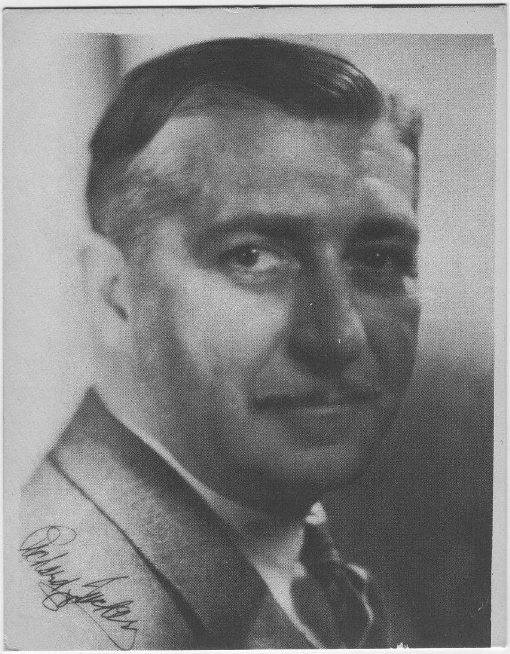
- Tucker in 1920
- Born: June 4, 1884; Brooklyn, New York, U.S.
- Died: December 5, 1942 (aged 58); Woodland Hills, Los Angeles, California, U.S.
- Resting place: Forest Lawn Memorial Park, Glendale, California
- Occupation: Actor
- Years active: 1911–1940
- Spouse(s): Mabel Reed (m. 1906; div. 19??); Ruth Mitchell (m. 1924; div. 19??); Arlene Andrews (m. 1931; div. 1936); Erma O. Deen (m.193?; div.1938)

Richard Whitlock Tucker (June 4, 1884 – December 5, 1942) was an American actor. Tucker was born in Brooklyn, New York. Appearing in more than 260 films between 1911 and 1940, he was the first official member of the Screen Actors Guild (SAG) and a founding member of SAG's Board of Directors. Tucker died in Woodland Hills, Los Angeles from a heart attack. He is interred at Forest Lawn Memorial Park, in an unmarked niche in Great Mausoleum, Columbarium of Faith.

== Personal life ==
In December 1931, Tucker announced his intention to marry his third wife, New York dancer Arlene Andrews. They married on December 15 and divorced in October 1936, having been separated for over a year. In September 1938, he divorced his wife of "a few months", Erma O. Deen.

== Selected filmography ==
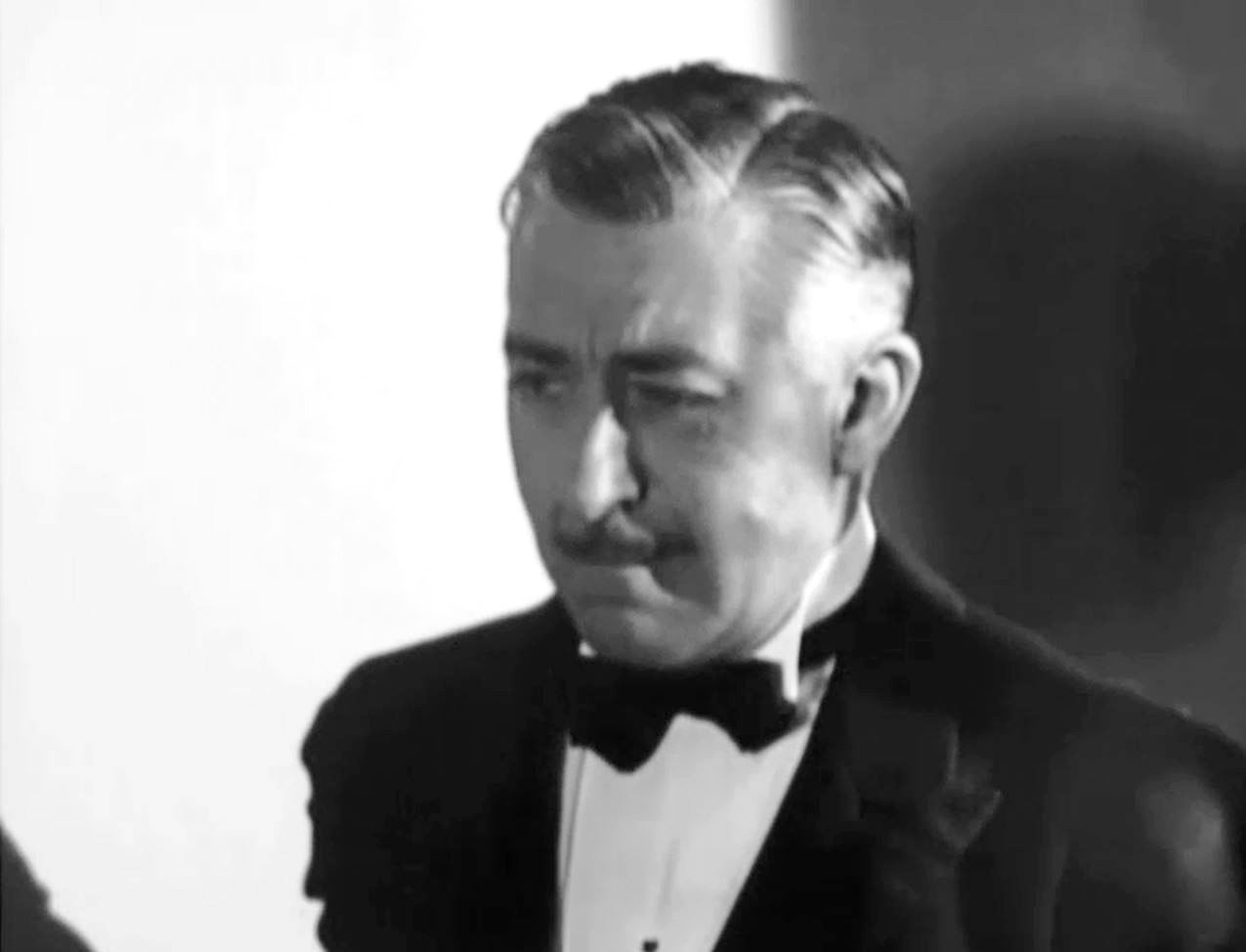
Tucker in The Road to Ruin (1934)

- Who Will Marry Mary? (1913) - Duke Leonardo de Ferrara
- The Midnight Ride of Paul Revere (film) (1914), directed by Charles Brabin
- Vanity Fair (1915) - George Osborne
- The Ring of the Borgias (1915) - Donald Rivers
- When Love Is King (1916) - Felix, the King
- The Cossack Whip (1916) - Sergius Kordkin
- The Master Passion (1917) - Professor Alberto Martino
- Threads of Fate (1917) - Dr. Grant Hunter
- Pardners (1917) - Justus Morrow
- The Royal Pauper (1917) - William, The Prince Charming, at 21
- The Cloud (1917) - John Saunders
- The Law of the North (1917) - The Rt. Hon. Reginald Annesley
- The Power of Decision (1917) - Austin Bland
- The On-the-Square Girl (1917) - Actor
- The Little Chevalier (1917) - Delaup
- Think It Over (1917) - Henry Whitworth
- Babbling Tongues (1917) - Viscount de Bellerive
- Behind the Mask (1917) - Lord Strathmore
- The Woman in Room 13 (1920) - Joe
- Dollars and Sense (1920) - George Garrison
- Darling Mine (1920) - Jay Savoy
- The Great Lover (1920) - Ward
- The Branding Iron (1920) - Prosper Gael
- Roads of Destiny (1921) - Lewis Marsh
- A Voice in the Dark (1921) - Lieutenant Patrick Cloyd
- The Old Nest (1921) - Tom at 36
- Don't Neglect Your Wife (1921) - George Geary
- What Love Will Do (1921) - Herbert Dawson
- Everything for Sale (1921) - Lee Morton
- Voices of the City (1921) - Clancy
- A Virginia Courtship (1921) - Dwight Neville
- Grand Larceny (1922) - Franklin
- The Worldly Madonna (1922) - Alan Graves
- Yellow Men and Gold (1922) - Lynch
- Strange Idols (1922) - Malcolm Sinclair
- When the Devil Drives (1922) - John Graham
- A Self-Made Man (1922) - Hugo Bonsall
- Rags to Riches (1922) - Blackwell Clarke
- Remembrance (1922) - J.P. Grout Jr.
- Hearts Aflame (1923) - Philip Rowe
- The Dangerous Age (1923) - Robert Chanslor
- Poor Men's Wives (1923) - Richard Smith-Blanton
- Is Divorce a Failure? (1923) - David Lockwood
- Lovebound (1923) - Paul Meredith
- Her Accidental Husband (1923) - Paul Dupré
- The Eleventh Hour (1923) - Herbert Glenville
- Cameo Kirby (1923) - Cousin Aaron Randall
- The Broken Wing (1923) - Sylvester Cross
- Beau Brummel (1924) - Lord Stanhope
- 40-Horse Hawkins (1924) - Rudolph Catalina
- Helen's Babies (1924) - Tom Lawrence
- The Fast Worker (1924) - Roxbury Medcroft
- The Tornado (1924) - Ross Travers
- The Star Dust Trail (1924) - John Benton
- The Bridge of Sighs (1925) - Glenn Hayden
- The Man Without a Country (1925) - Aaron Burr
- The Air Mail (1925) - Jim Cronin
- The Lure of the Wild (1925) - Gordon Daniels
- The Golden Cocoon (1925) - Mr. Renfro
- The Blind Goddess (1926) - Henry Kelling
- That's My Baby (1926) - Schuyler Van Loon
- Devil's Island (1926) - Jean Valyon
- Shameful Behavior? (1926) - Jack Lee
- The Lily (1926) - Huzar
- A Kiss in a Taxi (1927) - Henri Le Sage
- Matinee Ladies (1927) - Tom Mannion
- The World at Her Feet (1927) - Dr. H.G. Pauls
- Wings (1927) - Air Commander
- Dearie (1927) - Luigi
- The Bush Leaguer (1927) - Wallace Ramsey
- The Desired Woman (1927) - Sir Sydney Vincent
- Sumuru (1927) - Antonio Santos
- Women's Wares (1927) - Frank Stanton
- The Jazz Singer (1927) - Harry Lee
- Beware of Married Men (1928) - Leonard Gilbert
- Thanks for the Buggy Ride (1928) - Mr. McBride
- The Crimson City (1928) - Richard Brand
- A Bit of Heaven (1928) - Mark Storm
- The Grain of Dust (1928) - George
- Loves of an Actress (1928) - Baron Hartman
- Show Girl (1928) - Jack Milton
- Captain Swagger (1928) - Phil Poole
- Show Folks (1928) - Vaudeville Performer
- On Trial (1928) - Prosecuting Attorney
- Love Over Night (1928) - Richard TThorne
- My Man (1928) - Waldo
- The Border Patrol (1928) - Earl Hanway
- Lucky Boy (1928) - Mr. Ellis
- Daughters of Desire (1929)
- The Dummy (1929) - Blackie Baker
- The Squall (1929) - Josef
- This Is Heaven (1929) - E.D. Wallace
- The King of the Kongo (1929) - Chief of the Secret Service
- The Unholy Night (1929) - Col. Davidson
- Half Marriage (1929) - Mr. Page
- Painted Faces (1929) - District Attorney
- Navy Blues (1929) - Man Dancing with Alice (uncredited)
- Peacock Alley (1930) - Martin Saunders
- Puttin' On the Ritz (1930) - Fenway Brooks
- The Lone Defender (1930, Serial) - Introductory Host / Narrator (uncredited)
- The Benson Murder Case (1930) - Anthony Benson
- Courage (1930) - James Rudlin
- Safety in Numbers (1930) - F. Carstair Reynolds
- Shadow of the Law (1930) - Lew Durkin
- Recaptured Love (1930) - Rawlings
- Manslaughter (1930) - J.P. Albee, Attorney
- College Lovers (1930) - Gene Hutton
- Brothers (1930) - Prosecuting Attorney
- The Bat Whispers (1930) - Mr. Bell
- Madonna of the Streets (1930) - Kingsley
- Inspiration (1931) - Galand, the Writer
- Stepping Out (1931) - Charley Miller
- The Spy (1931) - Minor Role
- Hell Bound (1931) - Gilbert
- Too Young to Marry (1931) - Chester Armstrong
- Seed (1931) - Bliss
- Up for Murder (1931) - Cyril Herk
- The Black Camel (1931) - Wilkie Ballou (uncredited)
- A Holy Terror (1931) - Tom Hedges
- Graft (1931) - District Attorney Martin Harrison
- Convicted (1931) - Tony Blair
- The Deceiver (1931) - Mr. Lawton
- X Marks the Spot (1931) - Prosecutor Walter
- The Devil Plays (1931) - Gerald Murdock
- Maker of Men (1931) - Mr. Rhodes
- The Shadow of the Eagle (1932, Serial) - Maj. Evans
- Careless Lady (1932) - Captain Gerard
- Symphony of Six Million (1932) - Guest at Redemption Ceremony (uncredited)
- Flames (1932) - Garson
- Week-End Marriage (1932) - Mr. Jameson (uncredited)
- The Stoker (1932) - Alan Ballard
- Guilty as Hell (1932) - District Attorney
- Pack Up Your Troubles (1932) - Mr. Smith
- A Successful Calamity (1932) - Lawrence, Partington's Partner
- Hat Check Girl (1932) - Mr. Reynolds (uncredited)
- The Crash (1932) - Frank Parrish (uncredited)
- The Ironmaster (1933) - Paul Rankin
- Men Must Fight (1933) - Doctor (uncredited)
- Daring Daughters (1933) - Lawton
- The World Gone Mad (1933) - Graham Gaines
- The Working Man (1933) - Reeves Co. Board Member (uncredited)
- Made on Broadway (1933) - Party Guest (uncredited)
- Her Resale Value (1933)
- Midnight Mary (1933) - Club Imperial Manager (uncredited)
- Saturday's Millions (1933) - Mr. Chandler
- Meet the Baron (1933) - Radio Station Boss (uncredited)
- Day of Reckoning (1933) - Party Guest (uncredited)
- Only Yesterday (1933) - One of Jim's Friends (uncredited)
- College Coach (1933) - Regent (uncredited)
- Goodbye Love (1933) - Eddie the Lawyer
- The Women in His Life (1933) - Prosecutor (uncredited)
- Public Stenographer (1934) - James Martin Sr.
- This Side of Heaven (1934) - Henry W. Maxwell - Producer (uncredited)
- The Show-Off (1934) - Mr. Edwards (uncredited)
- The Countess of Monte Cristo (1934) - Joe - Picture Director
- The Road to Ruin (1934) - Mr. Dixon
- Looking for Trouble (1934) - Fuller (uncredited)
- A Modern Hero (1934) - Mr. Eggelson
- Sadie McKee (1934) - Dr. Patrick - with Dr. Briggs (uncredited)
- Wild Gold (1934) - Cafe Manager (uncredited)
- Operator 13 (1934) - Execution Officer (uncredited)
- Money Means Nothing (1934) - George Whitney
- Back Page (1934) - John H. Smith
- Baby, Take a Bow (1934) - Mr. Carson
- Paris Interlude (1934) - Stevens
- Handy Andy (1934) - Mr. Beauregard
- The Girl from Missouri (1934) - Paige's Office Manager (uncredited)
- Take the Stand (1934) - Mr. Burnside
- A Successful Failure (1934) - J.W. Blair, Atlas Broadcasting
- Elinor Norton (1934) - Civilian Doctor (uncredited)
- Evelyn Prentice (1934) - Mr. Dillingham - Party Guest (uncredited)
- Sing Sing Nights (1934) - Attorney General
- Biography of a Bachelor Girl (1935) - Mr. Neff (uncredited)
- Buried Loot (1935, Short) - Bank President (uncredited)
- Symphony of Living (1935) - Michael Rupert
- Society Doctor (1935) - McKenzie - Doctor in Gallery (uncredited)
- Shadow of Doubt (1935) - Mark Torrey
- West Point of the Air (1935) - George - Dare's Companion at Football Game (uncredited)
- Mister Dynamite (1935) - Doctor (uncredited)
- $10 Raise (1935) - Mr. Striker (uncredited)
- Murder in the Fleet (1935) - Harry Jeffries
- Calm Yourself (1935) - Police Inspector
- Dante's Inferno (1935) - Mr. Hamilton (uncredited)
- Here Comes the Band (1935) - Jim - Banker in Band
- Diamond Jim (1935) - Headwaiter (uncredited)
- It's in the Air (1935) - Revenue Chief (uncredited)
- Too Tough to Kill (1935) - Mulhern (uncredited)
- Ring Around the Moon (1936) - Baxter
- The Farmer in the Dell (1936) - Lou Wagner (uncredited)
- The Great Ziegfeld (1936) - Barber Shop Customer (uncredited)
- In Paris, A.W.O.L. (1936) - Army Officer
- Flash Gordon (1936, Serial) - Professor Gordon
- Special Agent K-7 (1936) - John Adams - Chief Agent
- In His Steps (1936)
- Libeled Lady (1936) - Barker (uncredited)
- Two Minutes to Play (1936) - Lyman Gaines
- Flying Hostess (1936) - Doctor
- The Plot Thickens (1936) - John Carter
- Headline Crasher (1936) - Sen. James Tallant
- We Who Are About to Die (1937) - Defense Attorney (uncredited)
- She's Dangerous (1937) - District Attorney
- The Woman I Love (1937) - General (uncredited)
- Shall We Dance (1937) - Mr. Russell - Attorney (uncredited)
- Armored Car (1937) - John Hale
- Dangerous Holiday (1937) - Stone (uncredited)
- I Cover the War! (1937) - Army Officer
- Roaring Timber (1937) - Brooks (uncredited)
- Make a Wish (1937) - Grant
- Jungle Menace (1937) - Robert Banning
- Big City (1937) - Dr. Franklin (uncredited)
- Trapped by G-Men (1937) - Agency Chief Conover
- The Girl Said No (1937) - Charles Dillon
- Something to Sing About (1937) - Mr. Blaine
- Rosalie (1937) - Colonel Brandon (uncredited)
- She's Got Everything (1937) - Dr. Blicker (uncredited)
- The Girl of the Golden West (1938) - Colonel (uncredited)
- The Higgins Family (1938) - Burgess
- Test Pilot (1938) - Pilot in Cafe (uncredited)
- Delinquent Parents (1938) - Harry Jefferson
- On the Great White Trail (1938) - Inspector Newcomb
- Letter of Introduction (1938) - Mr. Tucker (uncredited)
- The Texans (1938) - Gen. Corbett (uncredited)
- Sons of the Legion (1938) - State Commander
- Sweethearts (1938) - Man in Lobby (uncredited)
- The Girl Downstairs (1938) - Opera House Manager (uncredited)
- Trade Winds (1938) - John Johnson
- Risky Business (1939) - District Attorney
- They Made Her a Spy (1939) - Colonel at Explosion (uncredited)
- Sudden Money (1939) - Mr. Rodney Hinds
- Girl from Rio (1939) - Roger Montgomery
- The Covered Trailer (1939) - Doctor
- The Great Victor Herbert (1939) - Michael Brown
- Road to Singapore (1940) - Officer on Ship (uncredited)
