= The Evil Eye (1920 serial) =

1920 film

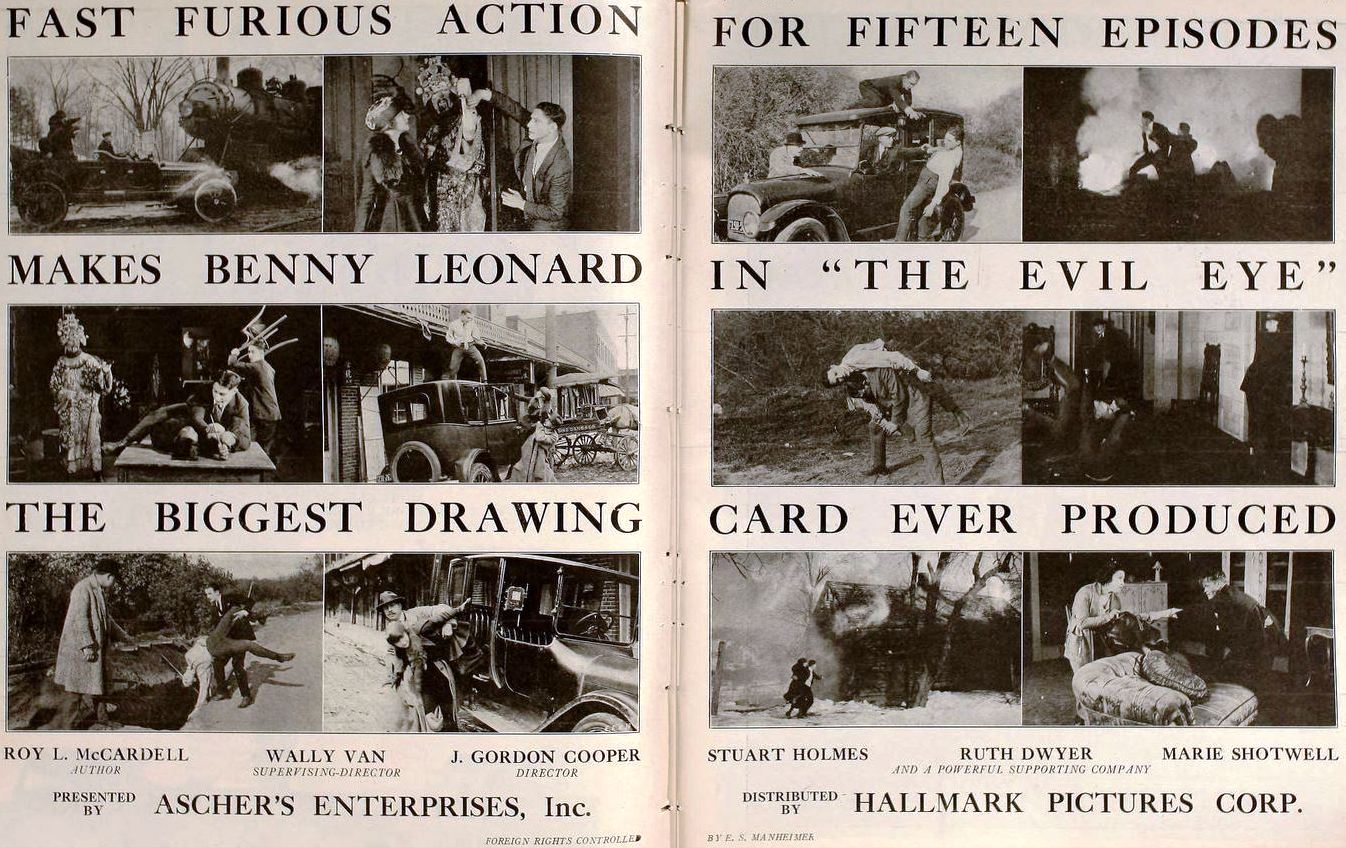
- Advertisement
- Directed by: J. Gordon Cooper; Wally Van
- Written by: Roy L. McCardell
- Starring: Benny Leonard; Ruth Dwyer
- Production company: Hallmark Pictures Corporation
- Distributed by: Asher’s Enterprise
- Release date: May 1920
- Running time: 15 episodes
- Country: United States
- Language: Silent (English intertitles)

The Evil Eye is a 1920 American silent action film serial directed by J. Gordon Cooper and Wally Van, written by Roy L. McCardell, and starring world lightweight boxing champion Benny Leonard, with Ruth Dwyer and Stuart Holmes. Produced by Hallmark Pictures Corporation and distributed by Asher’s Enterprise, the serial was released in 15 episodes beginning in May 1920. 14 of the original 15 35mm episodes survive.

== Cast ==
- Benny Leonard as Frank Armstrong
- Ruth Dwyer as Dora Druce
- Stuart Holmes as Denton Drake
- Walter Horton as David Druce
- Marie Shotwell as Mrs. David Druce
- Rosita Marstini as Marcia Lamar (credited as Madame Marie Marstini)
- Leslie King as Holy Joe The Money Lender
- Bernard Randall as Dopey Dick

== Chapter titles ==
1. Below the Deadline
2. In the House of the Blindmen
3. The Golden Locket
4. Vengeance of the Dead
5. Trapped by Treachery
6. On the Wings of Death
7. The Double Cross
8. (unknown title)
9. Ferocious Foes
10. Evil influence
11. A Monstrous Menace
12. The Path of Doom
13. The House of Horror
14. The Death Boxer
15. Winning Out

== Preservation status ==
The Evil Eye is not a lost serial. Records for individual episodes are held in the Library of Congress film archive (American Film Institute / Donald Nichol collection), and 14 of the original 15 episodes exist. The serial is as of 2026 in the process of being restored by Eric Stedman of the Serial Squadron.

== See also ==
- List of film serials
- List of film serials by studio
- List of lost films
