= The Unnamed Woman =

1925 film

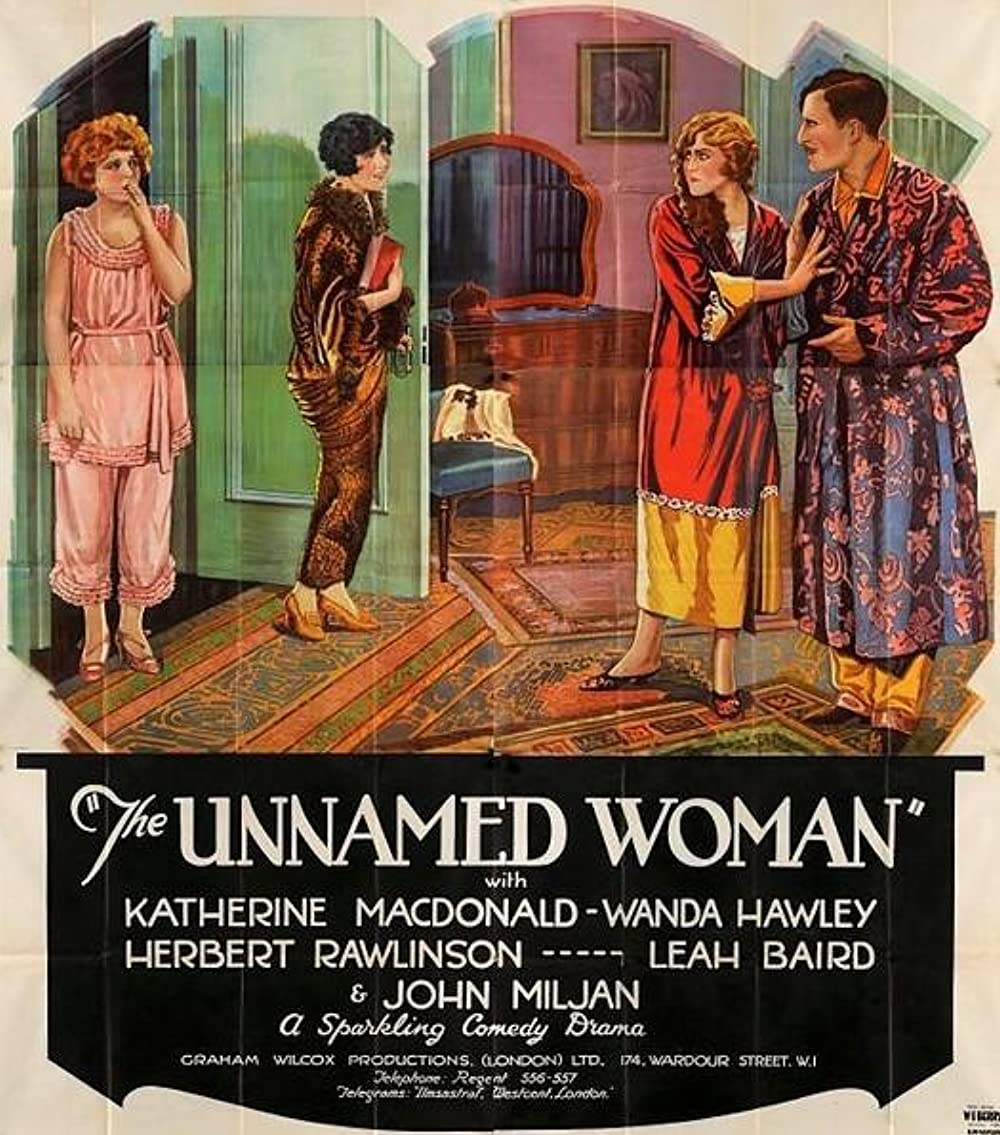
- Directed by: Harry O. Hoyt
- Written by: Leah Baird; Charles E. Blaney
- Produced by: Arthur F. Beck
- Starring: Katherine MacDonald; Herbert Rawlinson; Wanda Hawley
- Production company: Embassy Pictures Corporation
- Distributed by: Arrow Film Corporation; Graham-Wilcox Productions (UK)
- Release date: October 24, 1925
- Running time: 60 minutes
- Country: United States
- Languages: Silent; English intertitles

The Unnamed Woman is a 1925 American silent drama film directed by Harry O. Hoyt and starring Katherine MacDonald, Herbert Rawlinson and Wanda Hawley.

== Cast ==
- Katherine MacDonald as Flora Brookes
- Herbert Rawlinson as Donald Brookes
- Wanda Hawley as Doris Gray
- Leah Baird as Billie Norton
- John Miljan as Archie Wesson
- Mike Donlin as Chauffeur

== Preservation ==
With no prints of The Unnamed Woman located in any film archives, it is considered a lost film.

== Bibliography ==
- Connelly, Robert B. The Silents: Silent Feature Films, 1910-36, Volume 40, Issue 2. December Press, 1998.
- Munden, Kenneth White. The American Film Institute Catalog of Motion Pictures Produced in the United States, Part 1. University of California Press, 1997.
