= The Miracle Makers =

1923 silent film

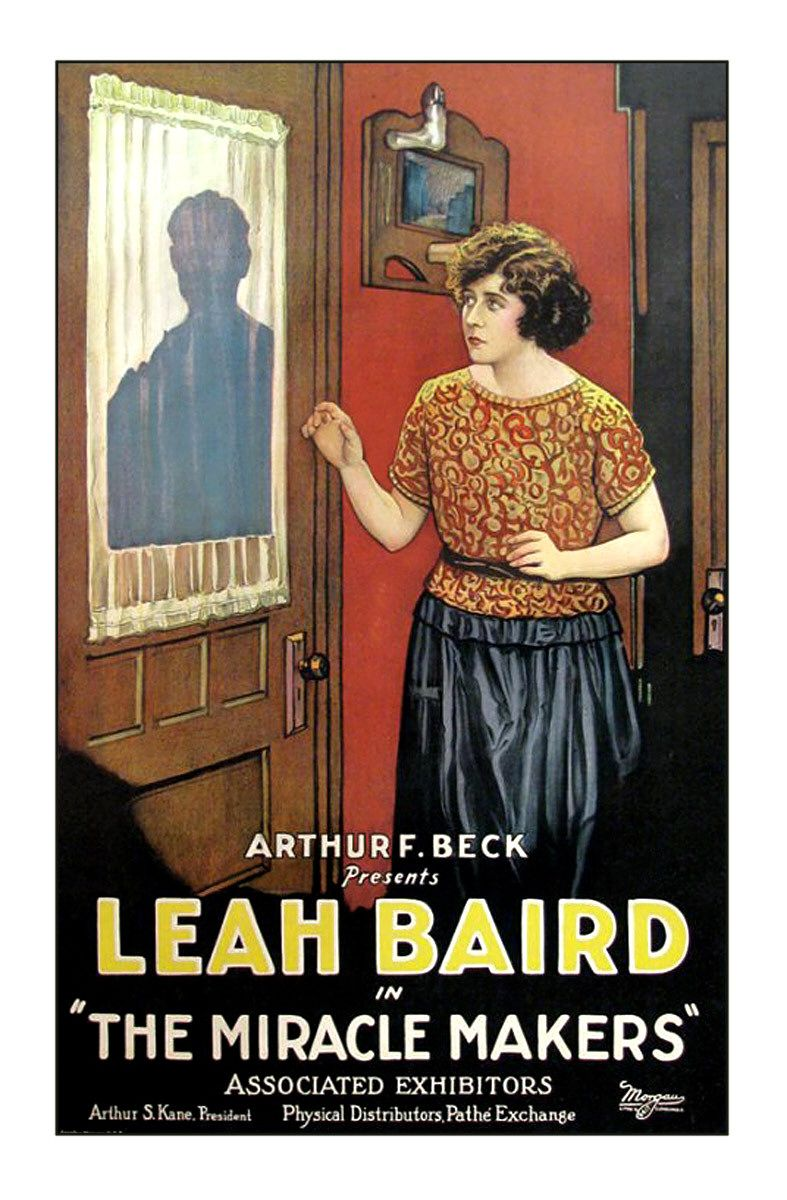
- Directed by: W.S. Van Dyke
- Written by: Leah Baird
- Produced by: Arthur F. Beck
- Starring: Leah Baird; George Walsh; Edith Yorke
- Cinematography: André Barlatier
- Production company: Leah Baird Productions
- Distributed by: Associated Exhibitors
- Release date: October 14, 1923
- Running time: 60 minutes
- Country: United States
- Languages: Silent; English intertitles

The Miracle Makers is a 1923 American silent drama film directed by W.S. Van Dyke and starring Leah Baird, George Walsh and Edith Yorke.

== Synopsis ==
Doris Mansfield is forced to marry Bill Bruce, despite being engaged to another man. When Bruce is sent to jail for smuggling illegal immigrants, she has a chance to start again with her real love, but he believes she has abandoned him and has gone to serve in World War I in Europe.

== Cast ==
- Leah Baird as Doris Mansfield
- George Walsh as Fred Norton
- Edith Yorke as Mrs. Emma Norton
- George Nichols as Captain Joe Mansfield
- Edythe Chapman as Mrs. Martha Mansfield
- Richard Headrick as Doris Mansfield's Baby
- Mitchell Lewis as Bill Bruce

== Preservation ==
With no prints of The Miracle Makers located in any film archives, it is considered a lost film. The film was cited by National Film Preservation Board on the Lost U.S. Silent Feature Films list in October 2020.

== Bibliography ==
- Connelly, Robert B. The Silents: Silent Feature Films, 1910-36, Volume 40, Issue 2. December Press, 1998.
