= Don't Doubt Your Wife =

1922 film

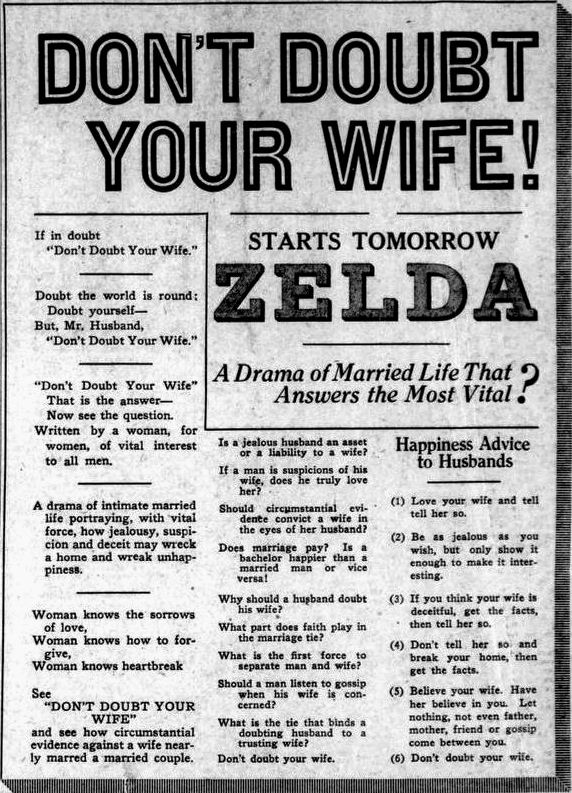
- Duluth Herald Newspaper Ad
- Directed by: James W. Horne
- Written by: Leah Baird
- Screenplay by: Leah Baird
- Produced by: Arthur F. Beck
- Starring: Leah Baird; Emory Johnson; Edward Peil Sr.
- Cinematography: Charles J. Stumar
- Distributed by: Associated Exhibitors
- Release date: March 12, 1922
- Running time: 5 reels
- Country: United States
- Language: Silent (English intertitles)

Don't Doubt Your Wife is a 1922 American silent drama film directed by James W. Horne based on the story by Leah Baird and starring Leah Baird and Emory Johnson. The movie was released on March 12, 1922 by Associated Exhibitors.

== Plot ==
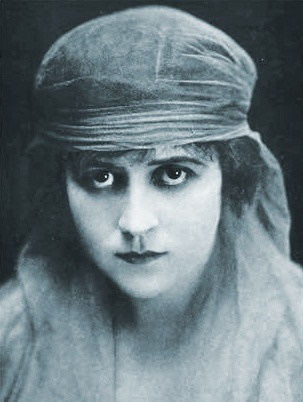
Leah Baird

Rose Manning, played by Leah Baird, is traveling home when a storm breaks out. She needs to take shelter and dry-off. She sees a nearby roadhouse and pulls-in. As luck would have it, taking refuge in the same lodge is an old boyfriend - Herbert Olden played by Emory Johnson.

Suddenly like the storm, prohibition agents show up to raid the lodge. Panic ensues. Even though Rose was drying her clothes and only partially clad, she still manages to bail out a back window. Herbert likewise follows her outside using the same window. Herbert senses she's embarrassed and cold, so he offers his coat.

Rose makes it home. She walks in the front door after midnight wearing Herbert Olden's coat. Rose's husband suspects she is having an affair. Her husband, John Manning, played by Edward Peil Sr, immediately orders her to pack up and leave. Rose pleads her case, but John will hear none of it. John states he will file for divorce in the morning.

Herbert Olden's mother remembers Rose. The Rose she knows couldn't have a secret affair with her son, despite what her husband thinks. She talks Rose into making one final appeal to her husband to take her back. Once again, her husband will not accept her explanation. He still intends to file for divorce.

Herbert Olden feels sorry for his old flame. He tries to make things better by offering to marry Rose once she gets her divorce. Rose is emotionally distraught, decides to accept his marriage proposal. The wedding plans solidify and the wedding scheduled. On the day of the wedding, Rose finds out she is pregnant. She is carrying her ex-husband's child. Herbert discovers Rose is expecting. He also finds out the baby is John Mannings. Herbert decides now is the time for a reconciliation between Rose and John.

John is having second thoughts about his divorce. Then Herbert appears and informs John of Rose's condition. John believes he made a big mistake when he parted ways with Rose. John drives to the church where the wedding is about to take place. He begs Rose for forgiveness. Rose forgives him. John takes Herbert's position on the altar. The reunited couple is married.

== Cast ==
Actor	Role
Leah Baird	Rose Manning
Edward Peil Sr	John Manning
Emory Johnson	Herbert Olden
Mathilde Brundage	Mrs. Evanston
Katherine Lewis	Marie Braban

== Production ==
Actress Leah Baird wrote the original story and screenplay for this production. She also starred and produced the photoplay.

== Preservation ==
Many silent-era films did not survive for reasons as explained on this Wikipedia page. (Note: Film is history. With every foot of film lost, we lose a link to our culture, the world around us, each other, and ourselves. – Martin Scorsese, filmmaker, director NFPF Board A report by Library of Congress film historian and archivist David Pierce estimates that: around 75% of original silent-era films have perished; 14% of the 10,919 silent films released by major studios exist in their original 35 mm or other formats; 11% survive only in full-length foreign versions or film formats of lesser image quality.)

According to the Library of Congress website, this film has a status of - No holdings located in archives; thus, it is presumed all copies of this film are lost.

== Gallery ==
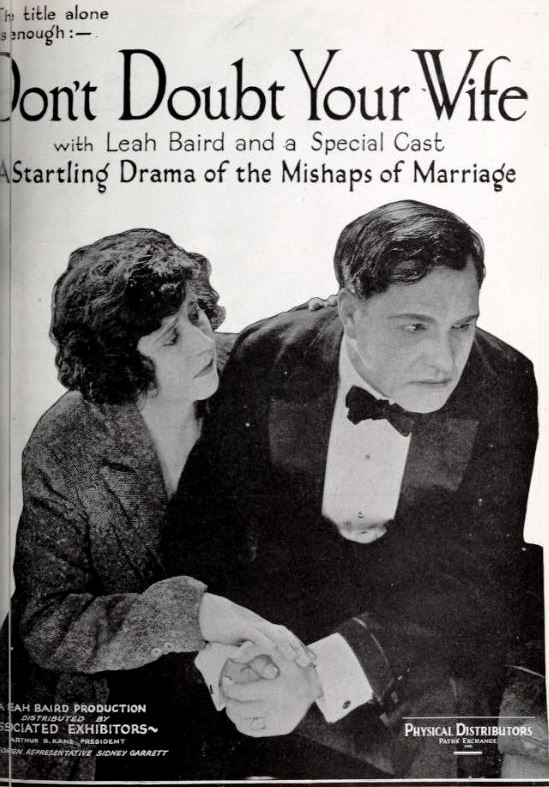
Exhibitors Herald Ad

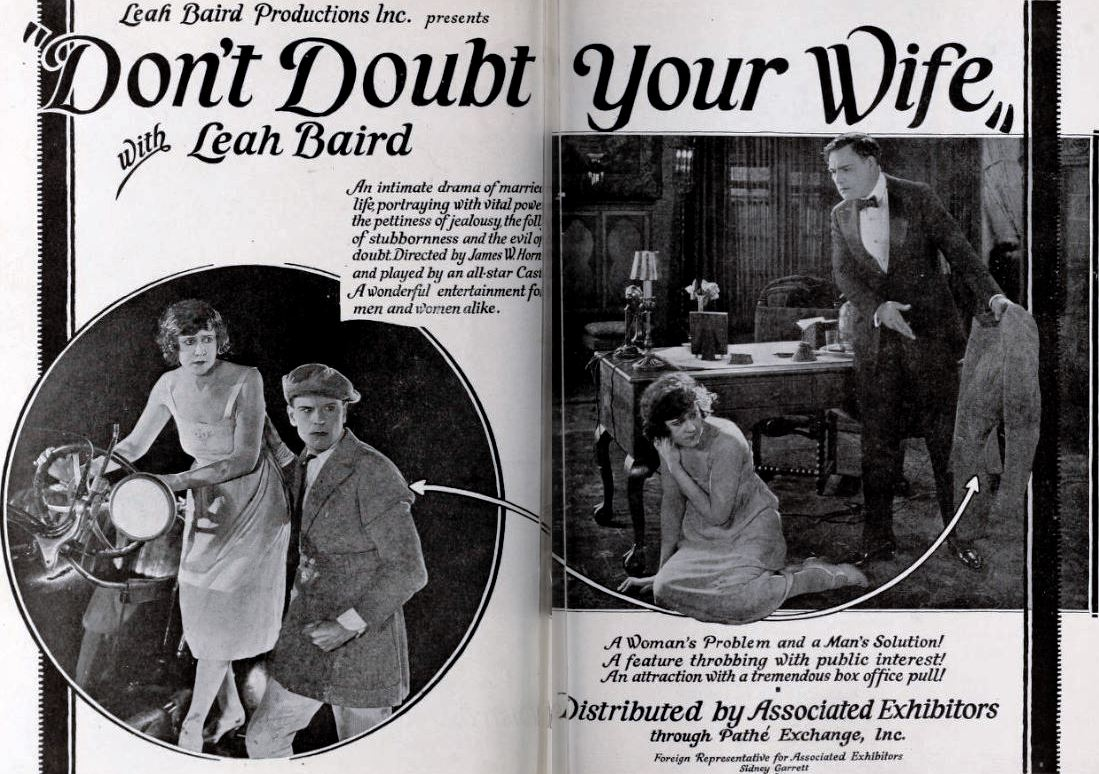
Exhibitors Herald Ad

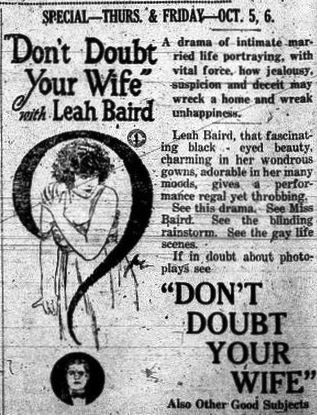
Newspaper Ad

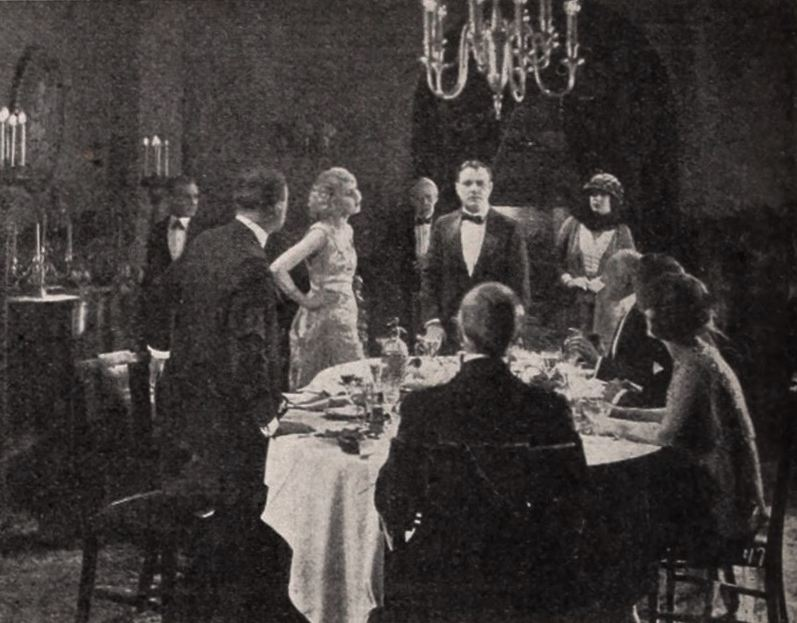
Movie Still

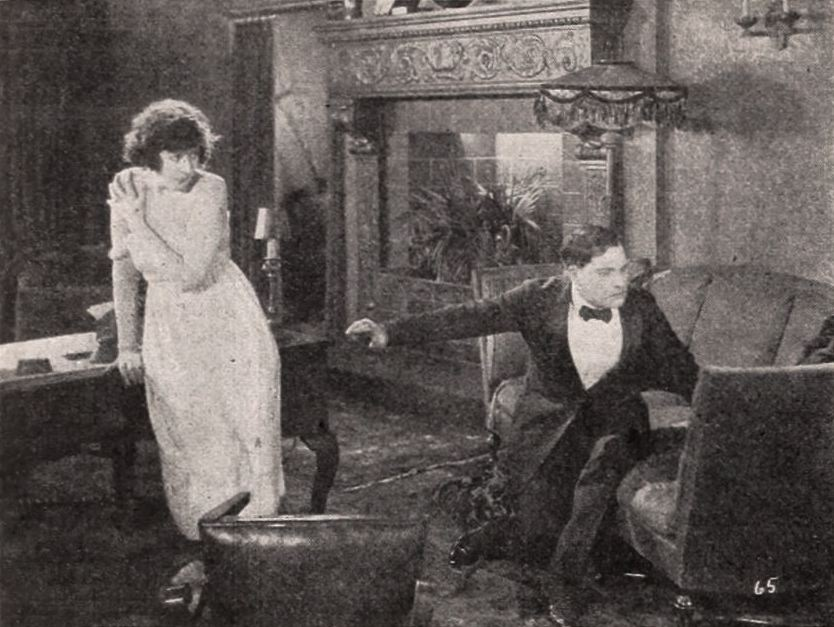
Movie Still

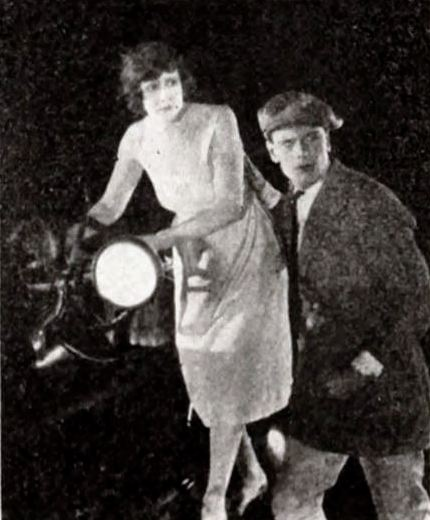
Movie Still
