= College Lovers =

1930 film

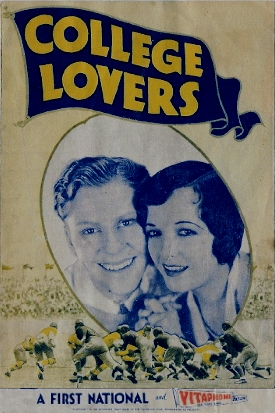
- Theatrical release poster
- Directed by: John G. Adolfi
- Written by: Douglas Z. Doty
- Story by: Earl Baldwin
- Starring: Jack Whiting; Marian Nixon; Frank McHugh; Guinn 'Big Boy' Williams
- Cinematography: Frank Kesson
- Edited by: Fredrick Y. Smith
- Music by: Alois Reiser
- Production company: First National Pictures
- Distributed by: First National Pictures
- Release date: October 5, 1930 (U.S.)
- Running time: 61 minutes
- Country: United States
- Language: English

College Lovers is a 1930 American pre-Code comedy film produced and released by First National Pictures, a subsidiary of Warner Bros. Pictures, and directed by John G. Adolfi. The movie stars Jack Whiting, Marian Nixon, Frank McHugh and Guinn 'Big Boy' Williams. The film was based on the story by Earl Baldwin.

== Plot ==
"Tiny" Courtley, a star football player, decides to leave Sanford college after he has found that his girlfriend has eloped with another man. He is driven to the train station by Eddie Smith, his best friend, and also a football player for the same college. Frank Taylor, who plays the part of the student manager of the Sanford college athletic association as well as part of the president of the student body, knows that the college needs Tiny to win the important game against Colton college.

Frank conspires with his girlfriend, Madge Hutton, to stop Tiny from leaving. He also makes use of the Frank's assistant, "Speed" Haskins. Madge fakes a suicide on a bridge when she notices Eddie and Tiny approaching. They quickly run to help her and both of them fall in love with her, without realizing that she really love Frank. Tiny and Eddie soon become suspicious of each other and constantly spy on each other, leaving Madge to spend her time with Frank. Just before the big game, Eddie and Tiny have an argument and show no interest in the upcoming game. Frank suggests that Madge write each of them an identical love note, telling the recipient that she loves him alone.

When Tiny and Eddie receive these notes, they end their quarrelling, each thinking that Madge prefers them to the other. Halfway through the game, one of them discovers the other's note and they begin accusing each other of stealing their notes. Their fighting causes them to be benched. Colton ties the score and promises to be the winner, which so scares Eddie and Tiny that they shake hands and go back into the game. When the winning touchdown for Sanford is a matter of inches away from the goal line, the two backs waste the last minute of the game trying to decide which of them will have the honor of making the final touchdown and the game ends in a tie.

== Cast ==
- Jack Whiting as Frank Taylor
- Marian Nixon as Madge Hutton
- Frank McHugh as "Speed" Haskins
- Guinn 'Big Boy' Williams as "Tiny" Courtley
- Russell Hopton as Eddie Smith
- Wade Boteler as Coach Donovan
- Phyllis Crane as Josephine Crane
- Richard Tucker as Gene Hutton
- Charles Judels as Spectator
- Pauline Wagner as "Speed" Haskins' Girl Friend

== Production ==
The film was planned as a full-scale musical comedy. The majority of the musical numbers of this film, however, were cut out before general release in the United States because the public had grown tired of musicals by late 1930. Although music was mentioned when the film was first released, ads and reviews soon mentioned that, even though Jack Whiting was a musical comedy star, there was no singing in the picture. These cuts accounts for the very short length of the film. The film was marketed as a straight comedy film. The complete musical film was released intact in countries outside the United States where a backlash against musicals never occurred.

== Songs ==
Although some modern sources mention the songs "One Minute of Heaven" and "Up and At 'Em" as being performed in this film, they were actually written for the 1929 musical comedy The Forward Pass. Since the film is now lost, and the music was cut from circulating prints in the United States, it is not certain what songs were written for this picture.

== Preservation ==
No film elements are known to survive, although there is a copy of the screenplay in the Department of Rare Books and Special Collections at Princeton University Library. The soundtrack, which was recorded on Vitaphone disks, may survive in private hands. It is unknown whether a copy of this full version still exists.

== See also ==
- List of lost films
