= Darling Mine =

1920 film

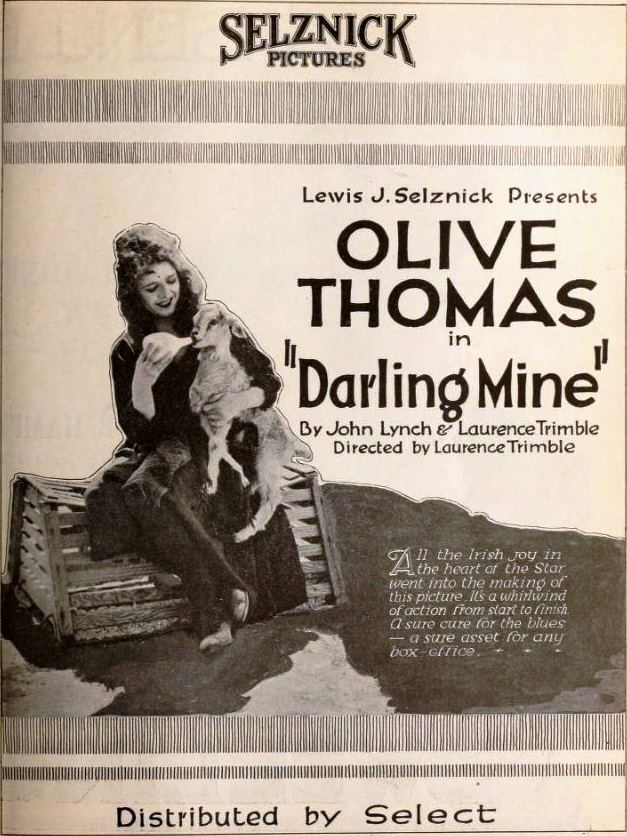
- Directed by: Laurence Trimble
- Written by: John Lynch; Laurence Trimble
- Produced by: Lewis J. Selznick
- Starring: Olive Thomas; Walter McGrail; Walt Whitman
- Cinematography: André Barlatier
- Production company: Selznick Pictures
- Distributed by: Selznick Pictures
- Release date: August 16, 1920
- Running time: 50 minutes
- Country: United States
- Languages: Silent; English intertitles

Darling Mine is a lost 1920 American silent drama film directed by Laurence Trimble and starring Olive Thomas, Walter McGrail and Walt Whitman.

== Cast ==
- Olive Thomas as Kitty McCarthy
- Walter McGrail as Roger Davis
- Walt Whitman as James McCarthy
- J. Barney Sherry as Gordon Davis
- Margaret McWade as Agnes McCarthy
- Betty Schade as Vera Maxwell
- Richard Tucker as Jay Savoy

== Bibliography ==
- Connelly, Robert B. The Silents: Silent Feature Films, 1910-36, Volume 40, Issue 2. December Press, 1998.
- Munden, Kenneth White. The American Film Institute Catalog of Motion Pictures Produced in the United States, Part 1. University of California Press, 1997.
