= When the Devil Drives (film) =

1922 silent film by Paul Scardon

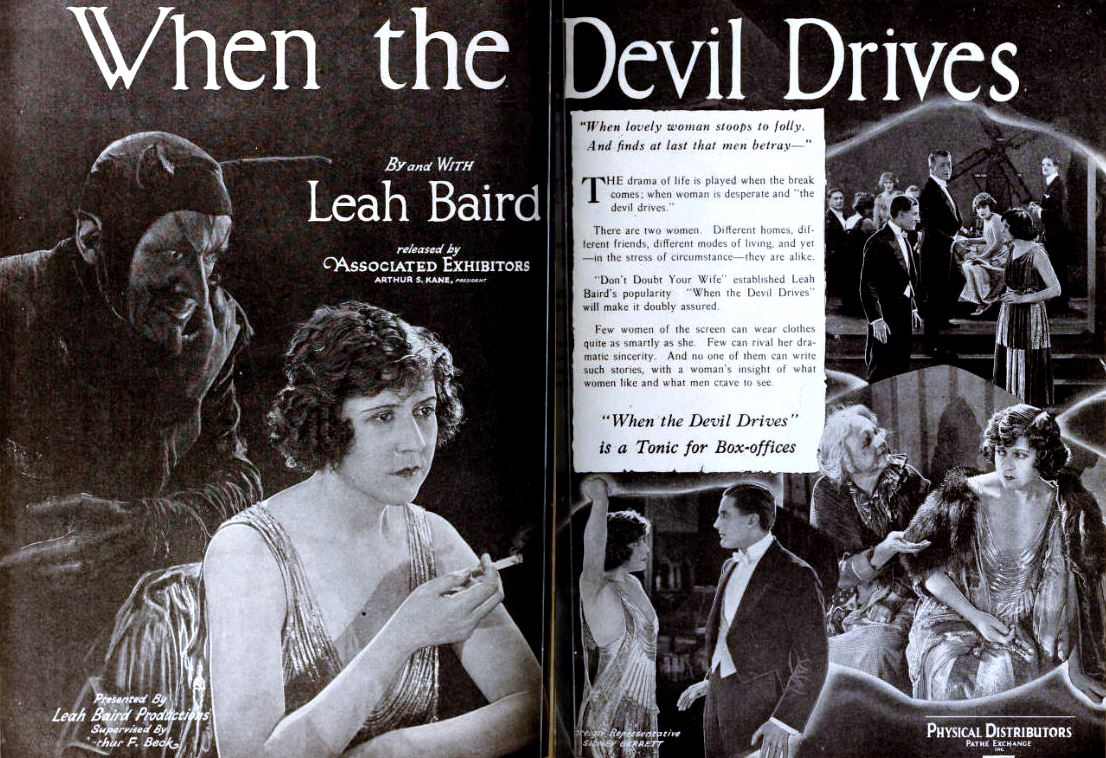
- Directed by: Paul Scardon
- Written by: Leah Baird
- Produced by: Arthur F. Beck
- Starring: Leah Baird; Arline Pretty; Richard Tucker
- Cinematography: Charles J. Stumar
- Production company: Leah Baird Productions
- Distributed by: Associated Exhibitors
- Release date: June 4, 1922
- Running time: 50 minutes
- Country: United States
- Languages: Silent; English intertitles

When the Devil Drives is a 1922 American silent drama film directed by Paul Scardon and starring Leah Baird, Arline Pretty and Richard Tucker.

== Cast ==
- Leah Baird as Blanche Mansfield
- Arline Pretty as Grace Eldridge
- Richard Tucker as John Graham
- Vernon Steele as Robert Taylor
- Katharine Lewis as Nanette Henley

== Preservation ==
With no prints of When the Devil Drives located in any film archives, it is considered a lost film. The film was cited by National Film Preservation Board on the Lost U.S. Silent Feature Films list in February 2021.

== Bibliography ==
- Munden, Kenneth White. The American Film Institute Catalog of Motion Pictures Produced in the United States, Part 1. University of California Press, 1997.
