= The Destroying Angel =

1923 silent film

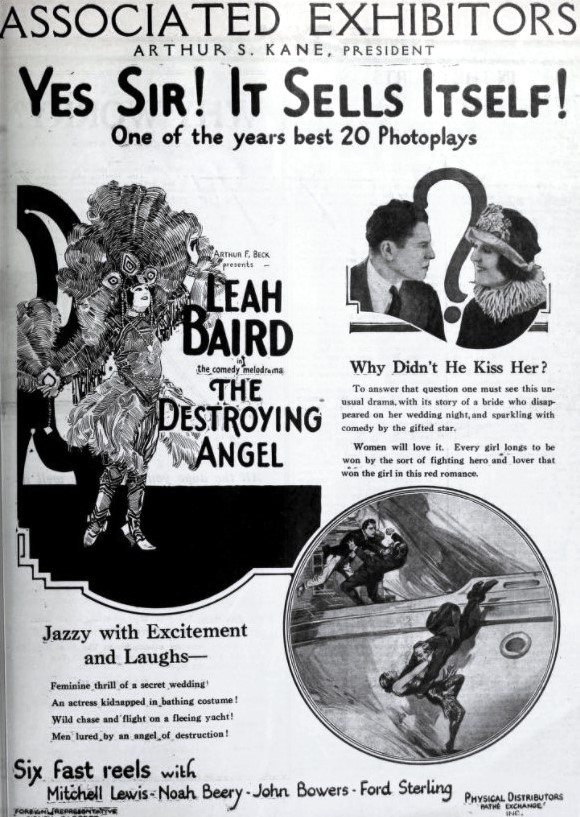
- Directed by: W.S. Van Dyke
- Written by: Leah Baird
- Based on: The Destroying Angel by Louis Joseph Vance
- Starring: Leah Baird; John Bowers; Noah Beery
- Cinematography: André Barlatier
- Production company: Leah Baird Productions
- Distributed by: Associated Exhibitors
- Release date: August 19, 1923
- Running time: 60 minutes
- Country: United States
- Languages: Silent; English intertitles

The Destroying Angel is a 1923 American silent comedy film directed by W.S. Van Dyke and starring Leah Baird, John Bowers and Noah Beery.

The film is based on Louis Joseph Vance's 1912 novel of the same name.

== Cast ==
- Leah Baird as Mary Miller / Saraa Law
- John Bowers as Hugh Miller Whittaker
- Noah Beery as Curtis Drummond
- Ford Sterling as Max Weil
- Mitchell Lewis as 'Strangler' Olsen
- Philip Sleeman as Kidnapper

== Preservation ==
With no prints of The Destroying Angel located in any film archives, it is considered a lost film.

== Bibliography ==
- Munden, Kenneth White. The American Film Institute Catalog of Motion Pictures Produced in the United States, Part 1. University of California Press, 1997.
