= Devil's Island (1926 film) =

1926 film

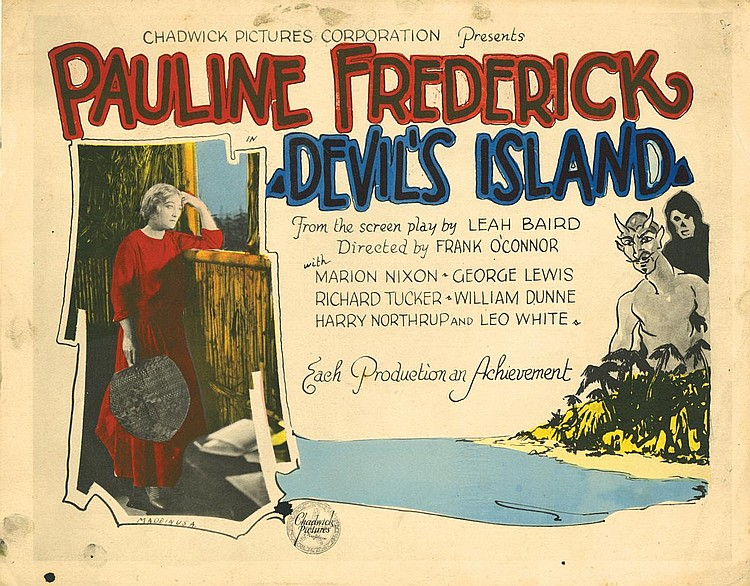
- Lobby card
- Directed by: Frank O'Connor
- Written by: Leah Baird (story & scenario)
- Produced by: I.E. Chadwick
- Starring: Pauline Frederick; Marian Nixon
- Cinematography: Andre Barlatier - (French Wikipedia)
- Distributed by: Chadwick Pictures
- Release date: July 10, 1926
- Running time: 70 minutes
- Country: United States
- Language: Silent (English intertitles)

Devil's Island is a 1926 American silent drama film produced and distributed by Chadwick Pictures and directed by Frank O'Connor. The film stars Pauline Frederick, Richard Tucker, and Marian Nixon.

== Cast ==
- Pauline Frederick as Jeannette Picto
- Marian Nixon as Rose Marie
- Richard Tucker as Jean Valyon
- George J. Lewis as Leon Valyon
- William R. Dunn as Guillet
- Leo White as Chico
- John Miljan as Andre Le Fevier
- Harry Northup as The Commandant
- Tom Mintz (uncredited)

== Preservation ==
Complete prints of Devil's Island are held by the Library of Congress, the UCLA Film & Television Archive in Los Angeles, and the Swedish Film Institute in Stockholm. The Library of Congress also holds a digital copy of the film, converted from a 16 mm print.
