= Two Can Play (1926 film) =

1926 film by Nat Ross

- French poster
- Directed by: Nat Ross
- Written by: Reginald Fogwell
- Based on: Two Can Play by Gerald Mygatt
- Starring: George Fawcett; Allan Forrest; Clara Bow
- Cinematography: André Barlatier
- Edited by: Gene Milford
- Production company: Encore Pictures
- Distributed by: Associated Exhibitors
- Release date: February 21, 1926
- Running time: 6 reels
- Country: United States
- Languages: Silent; English intertitles

Two Can Play is a 1926 American silent drama film directed by Nat Ross and starring George Fawcett, Allan Forrest, and Clara Bow.

== Plot ==
As described in a film magazine review, Dorothy Hammis, a young woman who is in love with James Radley, a high living but worthy young man, learns that her wealthy financier father objects to their engagement and says that he favors another one for whom the woman does not care. Secretly, the father has hired Robert MacForth, a former pilot, to assist in ending the engagement by discrediting James. To win her from the man he dislikes, the father sends both men and his daughter on an airplane trip but gives instructions to the man he favors to pretend a wreck of the machine. The airplane is really wrecked and the pilot proves to be cowardly. When the father learns what has happened, he alters his opinion of James, the man he previously thought unworthy.

== Cast ==
- George Fawcett as John Hammis
- Allan Forrest as James Radley
- Clara Bow as Dorothy Hammis
- Wallace MacDonald as Robert MacForth
- Vola Vale as Mimi

== Preservation ==
With no prints of Two Can Play located in any film archives, it is a lost film.

== Bibliography ==
- Munden, Kenneth White. The American Film Institute Catalog of Motion Pictures Produced in the United States, Part 1. University of California Press, 1997.
