= Walter Anthony =

Screenplay/titles/documentary film writer

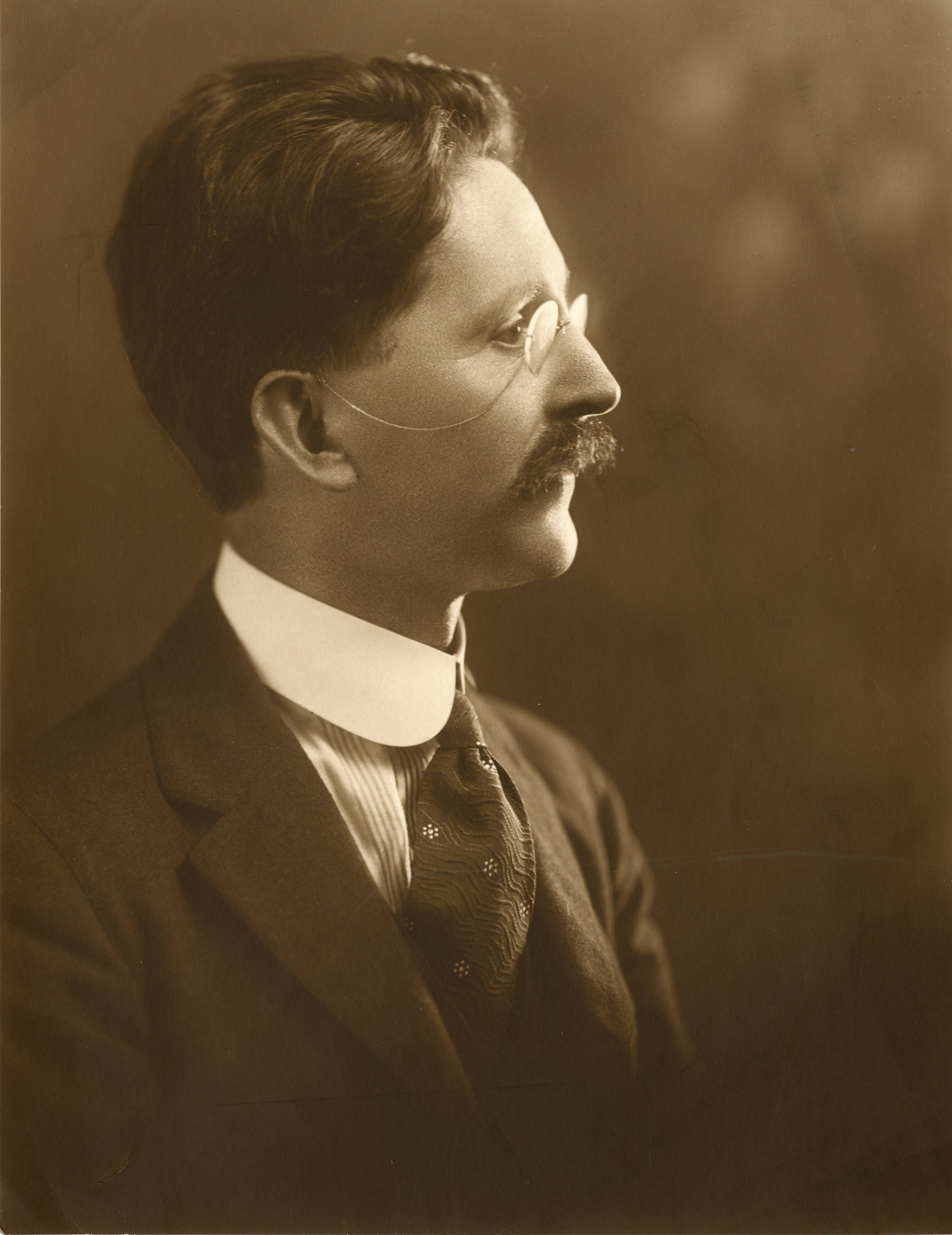
Walter Anthony, circa 1919

Walter Anthony (February 13, 1872 in Stockton, California – May 1, 1945 in Hollywood, California) was a screenplay, titles, and documentary film writer. Before Walter started writing in films he was a dramatic and musical critic for The San Francisco Call, San Francisco Chronicle, and Seattle Post-Intelligencer. At the time he came to work for the Post-Intelligencer in 1919, Seattle magazine The Town Crier described him as, "one of the few really authoritative critics of music and the drama in America." Writing in 1942 in a guest column for Walter Winchell, Lionel Barrymore singled out Anthony among the "great stage critics."

== Selected filmography ==
- Foolish Wives (1922)
- Oliver Twist (1922)
- The Drivin' Fool (1923)
- A Boy of Flanders (1924)
- The Lightning Rider (1924)
- When a Man's a Man (1924)
- After Business Hours (1925)
- The Phantom of the Opera (1925)
- The Cat and the Canary (1927)
- The Last Performance (1927)
- Jazz Mad (1928)
- The Michigan Kid (1928)
- The Man Who Laughs (1928)
- Girl Overboard (1929)
- Love and the Devil (1929)
- All Quiet on the Western Front (1930)
- Courage (1930)
- General Crack (1930)
- Golden Dawn (1930)
- Paroled from the Big House (1938)
