= Women's suffrage in film =

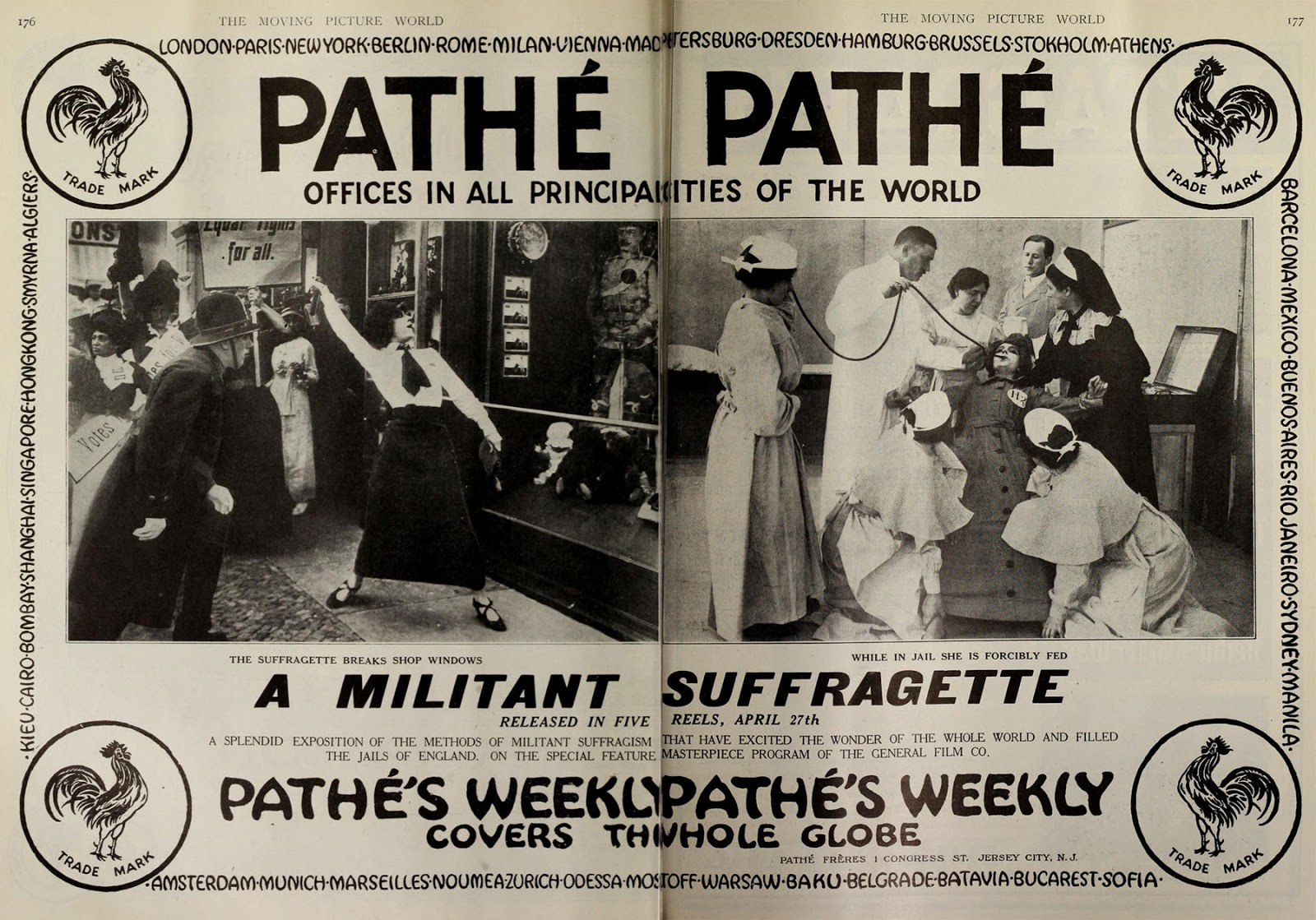
This advertisement for A Militant Suffragette (1913) shows the film's main character smashing a window (left) and being force-fed by doctors in jail (right).

Women's suffrage, the legal right of women to vote, has been depicted in film in a variety of ways since the invention of narrative film in the late nineteenth century. Some early films satirized and mocked suffragists and Suffragettes as "unwomanly" "man-haters," or sensationalized documentary footage. Suffragists countered these depictions by releasing narrative films and newsreels that argued for their cause. After women won the vote in countries with a national cinema, women's suffrage became a historical event depicted in both fiction and nonfiction films.

== General ==
=== Early silent films, 1898–1915 ===
Renewed campaigns for women's suffrage in France, the United Kingdom, and the United States coincided with the invention of the motion picture and the creation of the film industries in these same countries. Because of this, women's suffrage was a topic in some of the earliest narrative films. Film scholar Martin F. Norden views "suffrage films" as a distinct genre that had its "one and only heyday during the years prior to World War I". Like most films of the silent era, very few of these motion pictures survive, though descriptions from film magazines of the time help us understand their content and messages.

Early comedies and melodramas lampooned or attacked women's suffrage. Comedies created laughable suffragist characters, while melodramas showed suffragists ruining their lives, families, and communities. These films "echoed the vehement cries of politicians, journalists, and preachers who feared that women's suffrage would spell the death of femininity and the family."

Less than three years after the invention of narrative cinema, George Albert Smith satirized suffragists in his silent short film The Lady Barber (1898). In this comedy, a woman suffragist takes over a barbershop and begins cutting the hair of the "bewildered" male customers. Many such films explored what might happen if men and women switched gender roles, or if women took on the activities and responsibilities of men; examples include Alice Guy-Blaché's Les Résultats du féminisme (1906); She Would Be a Business Man (1910); and Georges Méliès's Fire! Fire! Fire! (1911). While Guy-Blaché's film used satire to demonstrate the sexism and abuse women face in a society ruled by men, films like Fire! Fire! Fire!, The Reformation of the Suffragettes (1911), and A Lively Affair (1912) showed women humiliated into abandoning the suffrage movement after trying to do the work of men.

A Busy Day (1914)

Comedies also used cross-dressing to parody suffragists. In the 1899 film Women's Rights, two men dressed as women unknowingly have their skirts nailed to a fence. Charlie Chaplin played a woman in the 1914 short film A Busy Day (originally titled A Militant Suffragette). Other films depicted women in male attire, including The Suffragette's Dream (1909), Méliès's For the Cause of Suffrage (1909), and A Cure for Suffragettes (1913, written by Anita Loos).

Carrie Nation may have been the first suffragist to be the subject of a film, though it was her hatchet-wielding temperance actions that were caricatured in Kansas Saloon Smashers and Why Mr. Nation Wants a Divorce (both released in 1901).

Not all early films opposed suffrage. In 1911 and 1912, Alma Webster Powell published two pro-suffrage photoplays. One of these, The First Woman Jury in America, was made into a film starring Flora Finch. Our Mutual Girl, a weekly serial that began in 1914 to promote Mutual Film, had several pro-suffrage chapters. In one, the heroine attended a suffrage meeting in Times Square and was introduced to Harriot Stanton Blatch and Inez Milholland.

==== Newsreels ====
Documentary news footage of suffrage demonstrations could present the movement in a positive or negative light. In 1908, British suffragettes invited news cameras to film a rally in Hyde Park, London; the footage became the first news coverage of women's suffrage on film. But newsreels could also present documentary footage of the suffrage movement in a sensationalized manner. For example, the newsreel Suffragettes Again (1913) showed firefighters attempting to put out a large fire supposedly set by British suffragettes. News cameras documented suffragist Emily Davison's 1913 death at the Epsom Derby and her funeral procession.

Newsreel footage of suffragist Emily Davison's death (1913)

Fictional comedies like How Women Win (1911) and Was He a Suffragette (1912) incorporated documentary or newsreel footage of real suffrage demonstrations, as did Votes for Women (1912) a melodrama produced by suffragists.

Thomas Edison recorded speeches by prominent American suffragists for his Kinetophone, an early system for synchronized sound, in 1913, but the resulting film has since been lost.

==== Films by suffragist organizations ====
Inspired by Suffrage drama and other public performances, the National American Woman Suffrage Association (NAWSA) and the Women's Political Union (WPU) both produced films featuring suffragist heroines as social reformers who take on corrupt politicians. High-profile suffragists from their respective organizations made appearances in two of these films: Jane Addams and Anna Howard Shaw appeared in NAWSA's Votes for Women (1912), while Emmeline Pankhurst and Harriot Stanton Blatch appeared in WPU's 80 Million Women Want–? (1913).

Chicago suffragists shot and screened footage to show first-time voters how to cast a ballot.

In 1914, NAWSA member Ruth Hanna McCormick released the pro-suffrage melodrama Your Girl and Mine. But suffragists found filmmaking too expensive to be sustainable and thus stopped making films after this.

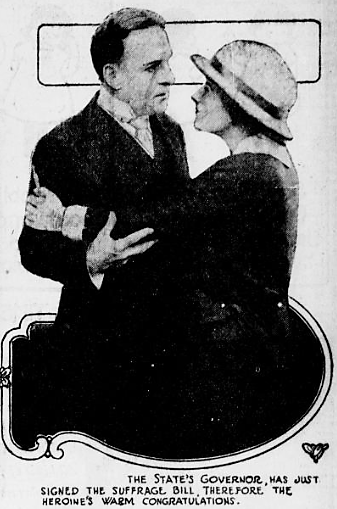
Image and caption from a New York Tribune article about the pro-suffrage film Your Girl and Mine (1914)

=== Later silent films, 1915–1919 ===
Though suffrage organizations did not make any official films after 1914, early Hollywood studios and filmmakers continued to comment on the campaign for women's suffrage in their films. Dorothy Davenport starred in Mothers of Men (1917), a melodrama that depicted a future where a suffragist holds an important political office. The Woman in Politics (1916), One Law for Both (1917), and Woman (1918) continued to "applaud suffragists' long persistent efforts for political equality."

=== Historical depictions, 1932–present ===
In the 1930s, American films began to look back at the campaign for women's suffrage in the U.S. and U.K. Fox Film Corporation released The Cry of the World, a documentary about the devastation of World War I that touched on women's suffrage and prohibition, in 1932. Subsequent historical depictions of women's suffrage included documentaries like This is America (1933), The Golden Twenties (1950), and 50 Years Before Your Eyes (1950); dramas such as The Man Who Dared (1933), Rendezvous (1935), Lillian Russell (1940), and Adventure in Baltimore (1949); musicals like The Shocking Miss Pilgrim (1947) and One Sunday Afternoon (1948); comedies including The Strawberry Blonde (1941), The First Traveling Saleslady (1956) and The Great Race (1964); and westerns like The Lady from Cheyenne (1941), Cattle Queen (1951), and Rails Into Laramie (1954).

Laura E. Nym Mayhall has argued that mid-twentieth-century depictions of suffragists like Mrs. Banks in the internationally distributed Walt Disney blockbuster Mary Poppins (1964) were part of a campaign to soften the history of suffragettes. The film includes the pro-suffrage song “Sister Suffragette” and can be considered a positive commemoration of suffrage history. However, Anna Stevenson has also highlighted how "the upheaval of the Banks household in the film reflects the chaos anti-suffragists believed would result from upturning social hierarchies based on gender, class, and race."

Twenty-first century films like Iron Jawed Angels (2004) and Suffragette (2015) have won popular and industry acclaim for reincorporating the radicalism of the suffrage movement. Iron Jawed Angels, introduced Alice Paul and her suffragettes to American and international audiences, whilst Suffragette explored the lives of militant women across the British class divide and depicted police surveillance of the militants.

== By country ==
=== Canada ===
The NAWSA-produced American pro-suffrage film Your Girl and Mine was shown by the Montreal Suffrage Association shortly after its 1914 release.

In 1958, the National Film Board of Canada released Women on the March, a documentary about the women's suffrage movement, women's political activism, and the United Nations.

=== France ===
Two of France's legendary film pioneers, Alice Guy-Blaché and Georges Méliès, each made films on the topic of women's suffrage in the first decade of the twentieth century. Guy-Blaché's Les Résultats du féminisme (1906) depicts a world of gender-role reversal, in which men are sexually harassed by women, while Méliès's For the Cause of Suffrage (1909) and Fire! Fire! Fire! (1911) use gender-role reversal and crossdressing to mock suffragists.

=== Germany ===
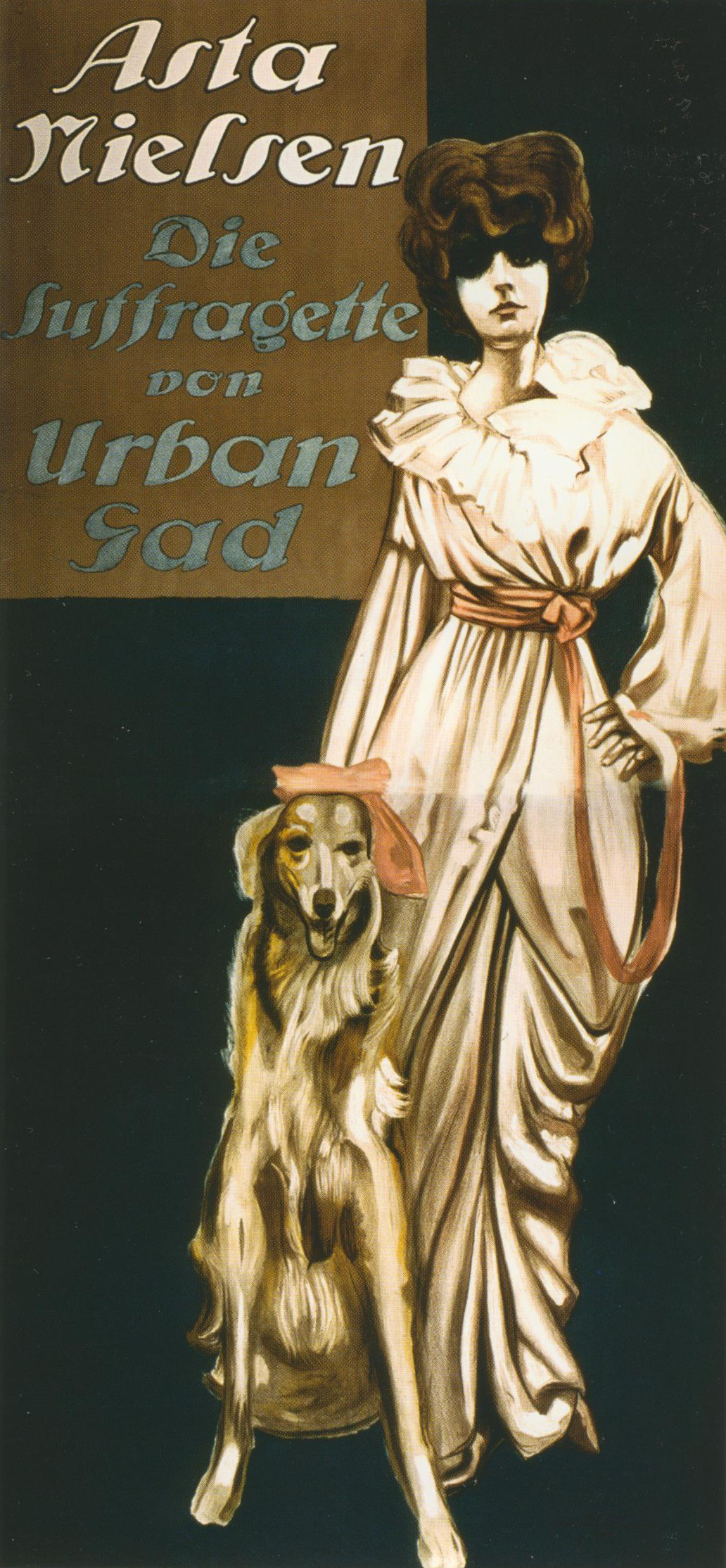
Color poster for Die Suffragette (1913)

Die Suffragette (1913, English: The Suffragette), also released as The Militant Suffragette, starred Asta Nielsen as a British suffragette who becomes involved in a plot to murder a politician. The film was distributed in Germany, America, England, Brazil, and Sweden.

=== Switzerland ===
The Divine Order (2017) is a Swiss comedy-drama about the referendum that granted women's suffrage in Switzerland in 1971. The file was written and directed by Petra Volpe, who spent years researching the era to accurately capture the conservative atmosphere of rural Switzerland. It was selected as the Swiss entry for the Best Foreign Language Film at the 90th Academy Awards.

=== United Kingdom ===
The earliest comedies about suffragists, The Lady Barber (1898) and Women's Rights (1899), were produced in Britain before the term "suffragette" was coined. Britain continued to make both fiction and nonfiction films about and featuring suffragettes, including Mass Meeting of Suffragettes (1910) and Milling the Militants (1913).

In 1908, British suffragettes invited news cameras to film a demonstration in Hyde Park, resulting in the first nonfiction film footage of the suffrage movement. Another early newsreel featuring suffragettes was produced by the Warwick Trading Company. It was shot in Newcastle, on the occasion of a visit to the city by the Prime Minister David Lloyd George on 8 October 1909. Suffragists can be seen in the film carrying banners and wearing ‘Votes for Women’ sashes.

British suffragettes were frequently featured in films made in other countries, as: "the British suffrage movement, which was the most violent, garnered the most interest among filmmakers—even fictional scenarios made by studios in other countries, such as Germany, Sweden and the USA, were often set in England to capitalize on the colorful protestors, who embraced the term 'suffragette'." See, for example, Die Suffragette (1913, English: The Suffragette), a German film in which Asta Nielsen plays a British suffragette.

In 1969 the British musical film Oh! What a Lovely War featured Sylvia Pankhurst, played by Vanessa Redgrave, addressing a hostile crowd with a speech against World War I before being jeered from her podium by the audience. This was followed by the landmark 1974 BBC television drama series Shoulder to Shoulder which covered the 1890s to 1919 in Britain over six episodes. It followed the suffrage movement as it was influenced by three of the Pankhurst women, Emmeline, Christabel and Sylvia and also included the story of the working class activist Annie Kenney. It was re-broadcast in 2024 on the 50th anniversary of the original airing.

Several other British television shows have featured suffragette characters and often "a common trope is the aristocratic lady dabbling with the suffragettes". During the first series of Downton Abbey, Lady Sybil Crawley goes to a Liberal Party rally attended by suffragettes, reads pamphlets about why women should get the vote and discusses female enfranchisement with her irritated father the Earl of Grantham and her romantic interest Tom Branson. In the 2012 show Parade's End a married aristocratic soldier has an affair with a young suffragette, and in the first series of Mr Selfridge the titular businessman finds his daughter campaigning amongst the crowd of a women's suffrage march in front of his new Selfridge's Department Store.

Between 2013 and 2015 the BBC comedy series Up the Women followed a fictional suffragist group called "the Banbury Intricate Craft Circle Politely Requests Women’s Suffrage". Emmeline Pankhurst makes an appearance in episode 3, played by Sandi Toksvig.

The 2015 film Suffragette is a historical drama about the British movement starring Carey Mulligan, Helena Bonham Carter, Anne-Marie Duff, Brendan Gleeson and Meryl Streep. It follows the fictional laundry worker and suffragette Maud Watts and includes secondary characters based on real individuals, including Emily Davison, Emmeline Pankhurst and David Lloyd George. The film was praised for historical accuracy, for its depiction of imprisonment and hunger striking, and has been described as "inspiring".

The documentary Make More Noise! Suffragettes in Silent Film was released in 2015 by the British Film Institute (BFI). It compiled early 20th-century film and newsreel footage to show how the suffragette movement was portrayed in silent films and wider media and depicted the societal perceptions that suffragettes faced. The 2018 documentary No Man Shall Protect Us follows a group of British suffragettes known as "The Bodyguard" in 1913 and 1914. These women trained in martial arts (known as Suffrajitsu) and carried concealed weapons to protect their fellow suffragettes from harm and arrest.

The upcoming film Lioness, a joint production between the National Film Development Corporation of India (NFDC) and the British Film Institute (BFI) about the life of Sophia Duleep Singh was announced in 2023.

=== United States ===
American film pioneer Thomas Edison's Edison Studios made early silent films satirizing both suffragists and anti-suffragists. These include The Senator and the Suffragette (1910) and A Suffragette in Spite of Himself (1911).

Films like Coon Town Suffragettes (1911) mocked both the suffrage movement and African-Americans.

But some American movie makers, especially women, were publicly in favor of suffrage. Mary Pickford was photographed reading a British "Votes for Women" publication. Women like Lois Weber and Bess Meredyth who worked at Universal Pictures and lived in Universal City, California, the studio's unincorporated community, ran for public office on a "suffrage ticket" that garnered publicity in 1913.

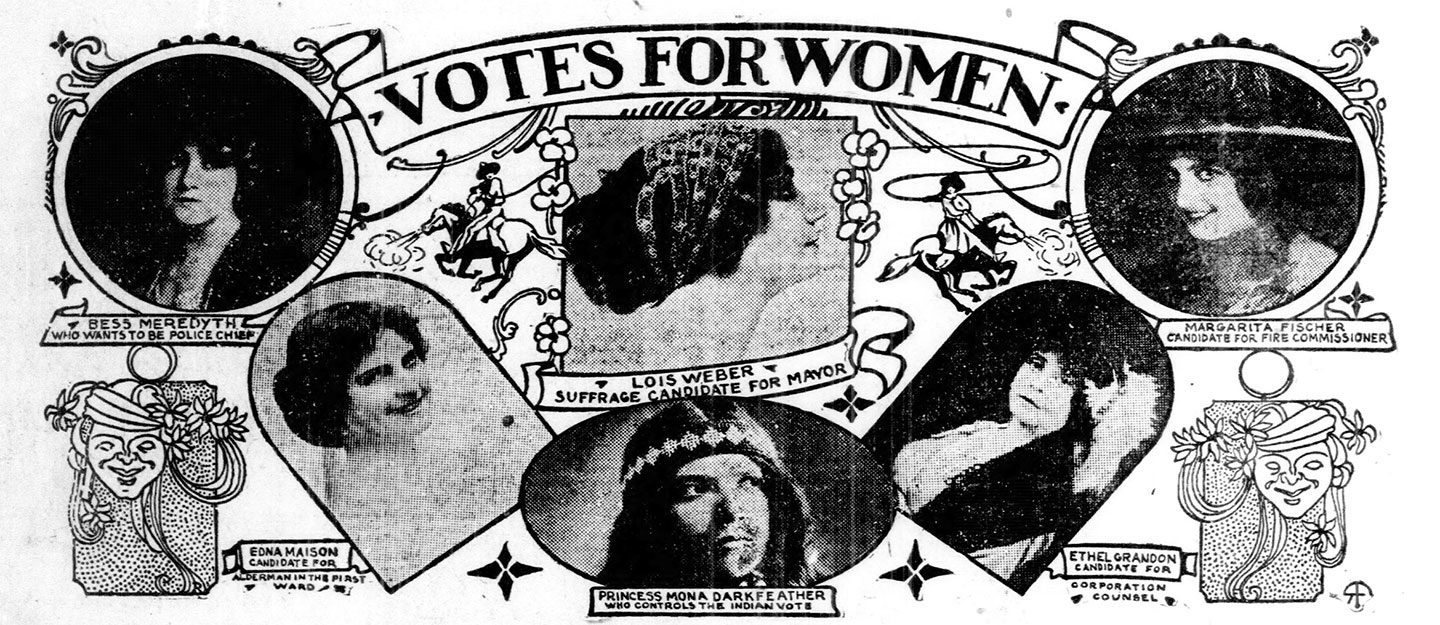
Advertisement for the "Suffrage Ticket" in the 1913 Universal City elections

Florence Lawrence participated in the Woman suffrage parade of 1913 on horseback, where she was filmed in Kinemacolor. Screenwriter Frances Marion participated in the October 23, 1915 parade that brought more than 30,000 supporters of women's suffrage onto the streets of New York City. Actress Fan Bourke opened The Princess, a 500-seat "votes for women" movie theatre, in New Rochelle, New York in late 1915.

The 1967 comedy, The Ballad of Josie, starring Doris Day, has women's suffrage as a major plot line. The movie is set in pre-state Wyoming, which in 1869 became the first government in the world in which women were given the right to vote.

In the 21st century, PBS American Experience's 2023 documentary The Vote was released to commemorate the campaign waged by American women for the right to vote and the passage of the 19th Amendment.

== See also ==
- Suffrage drama
- Art in the women's suffrage movement in the United States
- Music and women's suffrage in the United States
