= Your Girl and Mine =

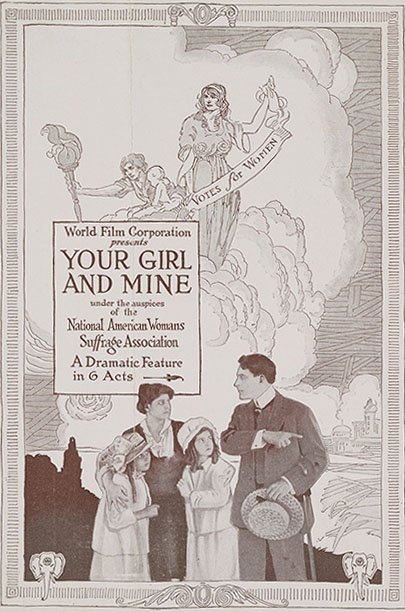
- Directed by: Giles R. Warren
- Written by: Gilson Willets
- Produced by: William Selig
- Production company: Selig Polyscope Co.
- Distributed by: World Film Company
- Release date: 1914
- Running time: 70 minutes
- Country: United States
- Languages: Silent film English inter-titles

Your Girl and Mine is a 1914 film promoting woman's suffrage. It was sponsored by Ruth Hanna McCormick as well as the National American Woman Suffrage Association (NAWSA). It was produced by William Selig and directed by Giles R. Warren. Gilson Willets wrote the script. Motography covered the film. The movie was shot in Chicago, Illinois.

On October 14, 1914, the film premiered at the Auditorium Theatre, Chicago. McCormick wrote about the film for the Richmond Times-Dispatch stating the "melodramatic photoplay will prove as effective in gaining Votes for Women as Uncle Tom's Cabin was in the abolition of slavery."

The film featured Katharine Kaelred, Olive Wyndham, and Grace Darmond. Also appearing was Anna Howard Shaw addressing a suffrage convention. The complete cast had more than 400 members.

It was shown at theaters nationwide over a two-year period. McCormick and the NAWSA organized to coordinate advertising and ticket sales.

== Cast ==
Cast as listed in the AFI Catalog

- Olive Wyndham as Rosalind Fairlie
- Clara Smith as Aunt Jane
- John Charles as Ben Austin
- Katherine Henry as Kate Price
- Walter Roberts as Old Austin
- Mrs. Tony West as Mrs. Austin
- Charlotte Stevens as Helen
- Ruth Grove as Beatrice
- Katharine Kaelred as Eleanor Holbrook/Belle Justly
- Francis Lenze as Rickets
- Sydney Booth as Lt. Governor Richard Burbank
- Grace Darmond as Equal Suffrage, an allegorical figure
- Margaret Collier as Justice, an allegorical figure
- Dr. Anna Howard Shaw as herself
- Helen Ware
- Louis Mann

== Gallery ==
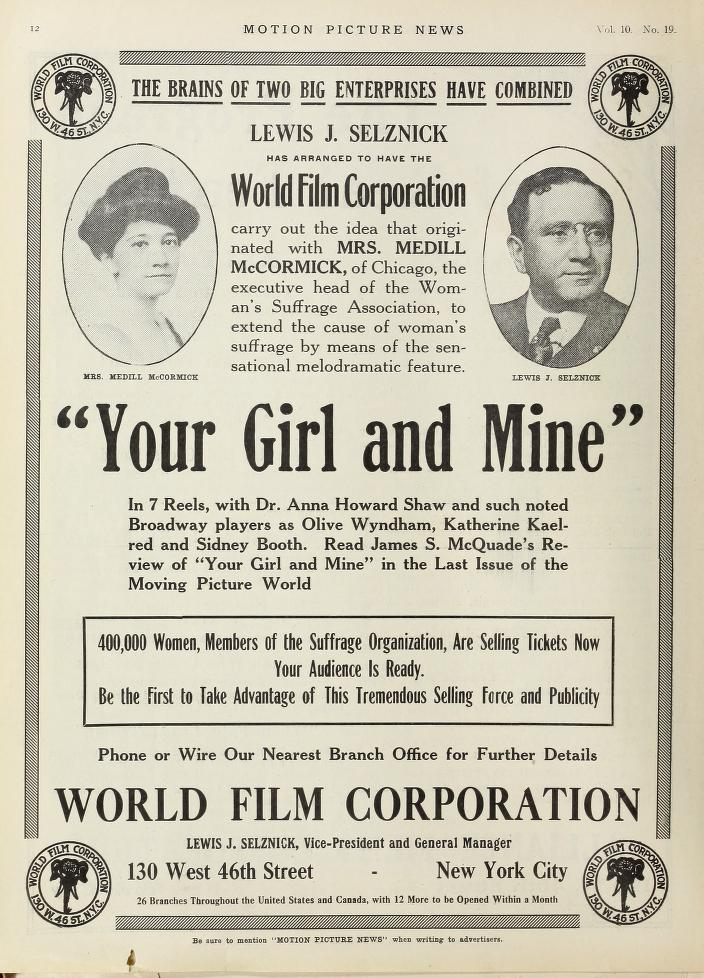
"Your Girl and Mine" advertisement

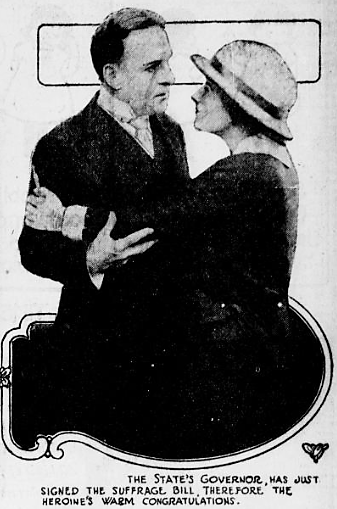
Still from the silent film "Your Girl and Mine", 1914

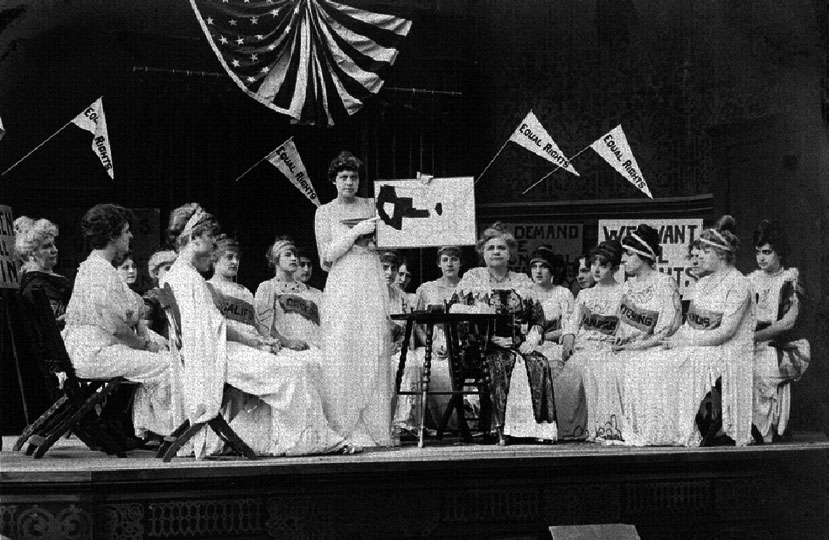
Still from the silent film "Your Girl and Mine", 1914

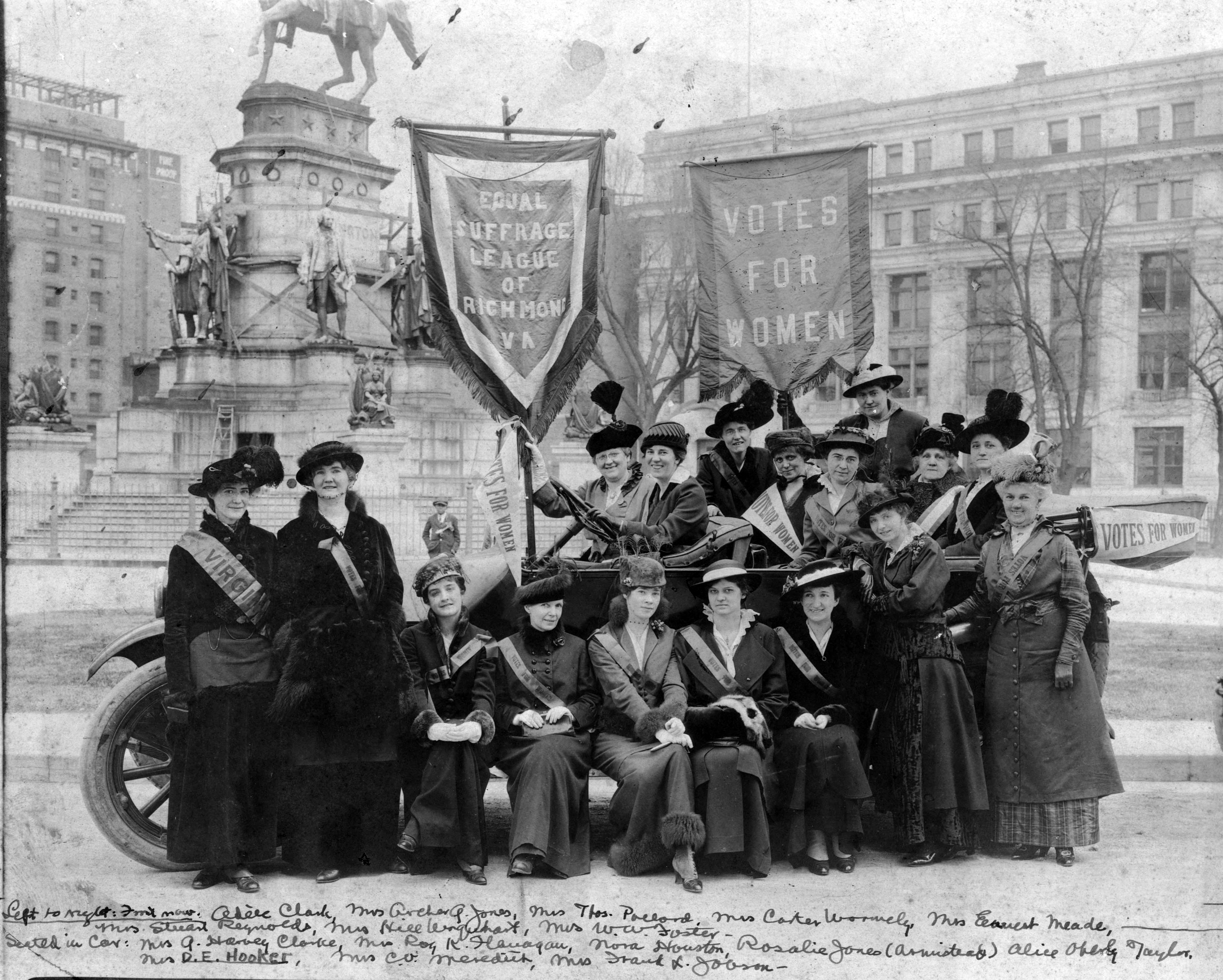
Equal Suffrage League of Richmond, Va. in front of Washington Monument, Capitol Square, Richmond. The members of the ESL were promoting the suffrage film, "Your Girl and Mine.", February 1915

== See also ==
- Women's suffrage in film
- Votes for Women (film)
- 80 Million Women Want–?
