= Runaway June (film) =

- Norma Phillips in Runaway June
- Directed by: Oscar Eagle
- Written by: George Randolph Chester and Lillian Chester
- Produced by: Reliance Film Company
- Starring: Norma Phillips J.W. Johnston Arthur Donaldson
- Cinematography: Arnold Genthe
- Distributed by: Mutual Film Corporation
- Release date: January 1915-April 1915
- Running time: 15 episodes, 20 minutes
- Country: United States
- Language: Silent

Runaway June is a lost 1915 American film serial starring Norma Phillips and J. W. Johnston. The series was released on January 13, 1915, in fifteen 20-minute weekly episodes. It was produced by the Reliance Film Company and distributed by the Mutual Film Corporation.

Runaway June followed Reliance Film's Our Mutual Girl, a 52-episode 1914 film serial, which also staring Phillips and Johnston. Reliance announced that George Randolph Chester, in collaboration with his wife Lillian Chester, had agreed to write the Runaway June for $25,000. Runaway June also appeared as a photodrama in installments in newspapers, and a novelized version of the series, with twenty-eight chapters, was published by the Serial Publication Corporation, a division of Hearst's International Library Co., Inc.

The Reliance Company engaged the still photographer Arnold Genthe as cameraman and it was directed by Oscar Eagle.

== Plot ==
On the day of her wedding, June is given some money by her husband and realizes that she is now financially dependent on him. Unhappy with this situation she flees. Her husband and a mysterious man with a black Van Dyck beard pursue her. Each episode is structured around a chase in which June evades her family, friends, and the mystery man as they follow her. The pursuit begins in New York City then moves onto a yacht bound for the Caribbean, then in Bermuda before returning to New York where it is revealed that June is the leading woman of a film serial, and she thus has found a way to be financially independent.

== Cast ==
- Norma Phillips as June Moore
- J. W. Johnston as New Warner
- Dora Mills Adams as Mrs. Moore
- Alfred Fisher as Mr. Moore
- Arthur Donaldson as Gilbert Blye
- Winnifred Burke as Iris Bletherington
- William J. Marlo as Bobby Bletherington
- Evelyn Dunno as Marie
- Ricca Allen as Mrs. Honoria Blye
- Miss Myra Brooks as Aunt Debby

== Episode titles (incomplete) ==
1. Runaway June
2. The Quest of the Bride
3. The Weaving of the Web
4. June Becomes a Governess
5. Trapped in a Gambling House
6. June in the Role of Peacemaker
7. June is Hounded by Gilbert Blye
8. June's Adventures in the Sanitorium
9. June in Danger at Mrs. Villard's
10. [Unknown]
11. June Has an Adventure with Pirates
12. [Unknown]
13. June's Adventure with the Mystic
14. Junes Escapes from the Apaches
15. And So They Lived Happily Ever After

== Promotion ==
A teaser advertisement in Motion Picture News (November 1914) asked "Why Did June Run Away? Who is June? Why is her Name Runaway June?" An advertisement in The Billboard claimed, "Runaway June is the Name of the Greatest, Grandest Most Sensational and Elaborate Serial Ever Produced."

During the serials run Reliance ran the Runaway June California Trip Contest where a theatre patron might be "one of 48 lucky young women to go to the California fairs free--as a guest of Runaway June." "The contest was open only to women and was publicized only in women's magazines and sewing-pattern monthlies."

Screenwriters George and Lillian Chester purported to have taken a new tactic in their approach to writing the film, in that they would visualize the story before writing it rather than basing it on a pre-existing literary property. Motion Picture News reports that he and Mrs. Chester "laid out the following plan. We first of all take our main plot and determine upon the lines to pursue. [...] After that an action plot is written out entirely devoid of the dialogue. When we have this action plot so that it suits us, we then rewrite the whole thing and place our dialogue where it suitably belongs."

The film serial was accompanied by the release of a novelty song Runaway June with words and music by Harold Freeman. The song was performed by Albert Campbell and Henry Burr.

== Reception ==
Variety reported Runaway June was part of a "deluge" of film serials released in the mid-teens alongside serials such as The Black Box (1915), The Million Dollar Mystery (1914), and Kalem's ongoing Hazards of Helen (1914-1917) produced to meet popular demand.

Reviews of Runaway June were mixed. The Vicksburg Post, when announcing the upcoming screening of the seventh installment, noted "quite a number of people are keeping up with the story." However, Tarleton Winchester wrote in Motion Picture Magazine, "How long this chase is going to last I don't know. My interest stopped running some time ago, and it will take something unexpected to revive it." Variety reported that the Savoy Theatre in New York City had discontinued screening the serial in mid-March 1915 as it "failed to catch on with audiences who had shown their disapproval on a number of occasions."

== Preservation ==
No copies of any episodes are known to exist, and the film serial is presumed lost.
