= Mama's Affair =

Mama's Affair may refer to:

- Mama's Affair (1921 film), an American silent romantic comedy film
- Mama's Affair (2022 film), a Hong Kong drama film
