= Margaret Howe =

Margaret Howe may refer to:

- Margaret Howe (squash player) (1897–1989), American squash player
- Margaret Howe (athlete) (born 1958), Canadian sprinter
- Margaret Howe Lovatt (born 1942), American naturalist
- Margaret Ascham (c. 1528 – c. 1592), English writer
- Margaretta Brucker (pseudonym Margaret Howe), American fiction author
- Margaret Vale (married name Howe; 1878–?), American actress and feminist
