= Edgena De Lespine =

American actress

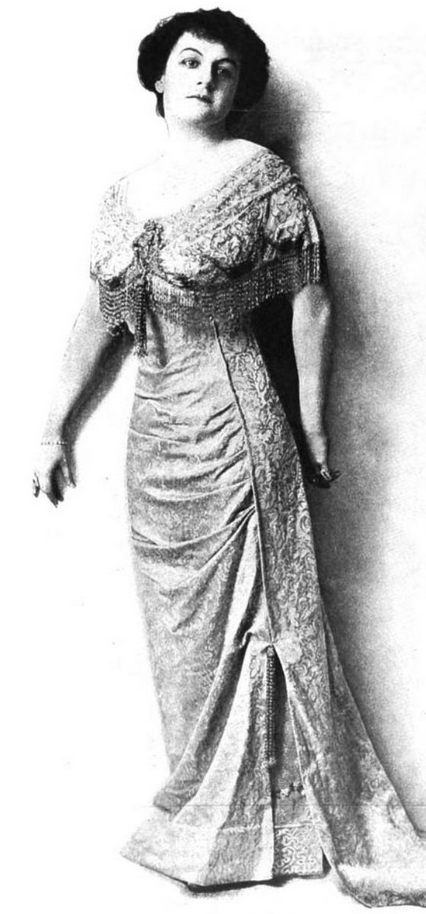
- Edgena De Lespine, from a 1913 publication
- Born: Edgena Stoddart Brown; February 1882; Galveston, Texas
- Died: January 30, 1920 (aged 37); New York
- Occupation: Silent film actress

Edgena De Lespine (February 1882 – January 30, 1920) born Edgena Stoddart Brown, was a silent film and stage actress in the United States.

== Early life ==
Edgena Brown was born in Galveston, Texas. Her parents were John Stoddart Brown (1848–1912) and Helen A. Delespine Brown (1849–1910). Her father owned a hardware store.

== Career ==
De Lespine was an actress in plays and in vaudeville, and had several starring roles in silent films. She starred in the 1913 play London Assurance, and in The Good Within. She worked at Reliance until she moved to Biograph in 1914. She was considered a beauty. She made several films with child actress Runa Hodges, including Runa Plays Cupid, The Dream Home, and The House of Pretense.

Beyond acting, De Lespine advertised her willingness to do "New York shopping" for Texas women, without charge.

== Personal life ==
De Lespine married Eugene W. Tips (born 1874) in 1900. In 1915, she married her second husband, stock broker Henry Glover Hemming (1872–1921). She died on January 30, 1920. Her grave is in Woodlawn Cemetery in New York. Her second husband was killed the following year, after he married her twice-divorced sister, Helen Henderson.

== Filmography ==
- The Old Mam'selle's Secret (1912)
- Votes for Women (1912), movie about suffrage
- The Good Within (1913)
- Twickenham Ferry (1913)
- Runa Plays Cupid (1913)
- Half a Chance (1913)
- Eternal Sacrifice
- The Social Secretary (1913)
- The Little Pirate (1913)
- The Bawlerout (1913)
- The Dream Home (1913)
- Rowdy the Dog
- Dick's Turning (1913)
- Ashes (1913 film), story by Marion Brooks
- London Assurance (1913 film) (1913), an adaptation of the play London Assurance
- A Night of Terror (1913)
- The Turning Point based on the play by Preston Gibson
- The Higher Justice by Forrest Halsey (1913)
- The Tangled Web (film) (1913)
- The House of Pretense (1913)
