= Enlighten Thy Daughter =

Enlighten Thy Daughter may refer to:

- Enlighten Thy Daughter (1917 film), an American silent drama film
- Enlighten Thy Daughter (1934 film), an American drama film
