= Katharine Kaelred =

British actress

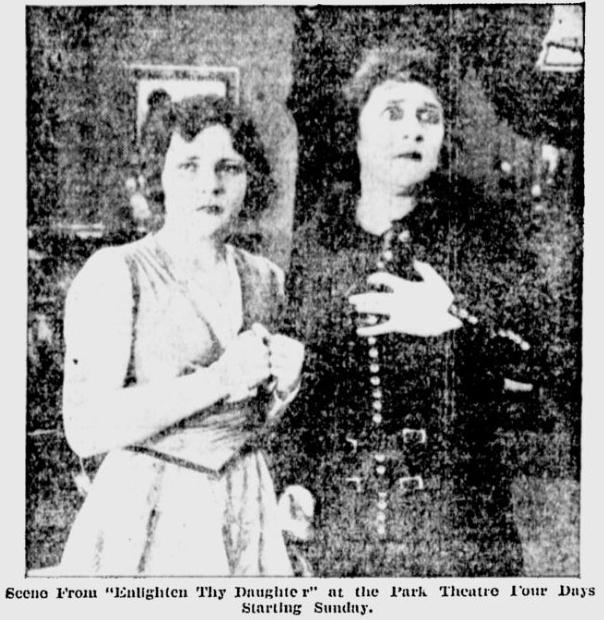
Zena Keefe and Katharine Kaelred in Enlighten Thy Daughter

Katharine Kaelred (May 9,1882 - March 26, 1942) was an actor on stage and screen. She was from England. The National Portrait Gallery in London has several images of her by Alexander Bassano. The Library of Congress has a glass negative of her. She starred on Broadway and in films including The Winged Idol.

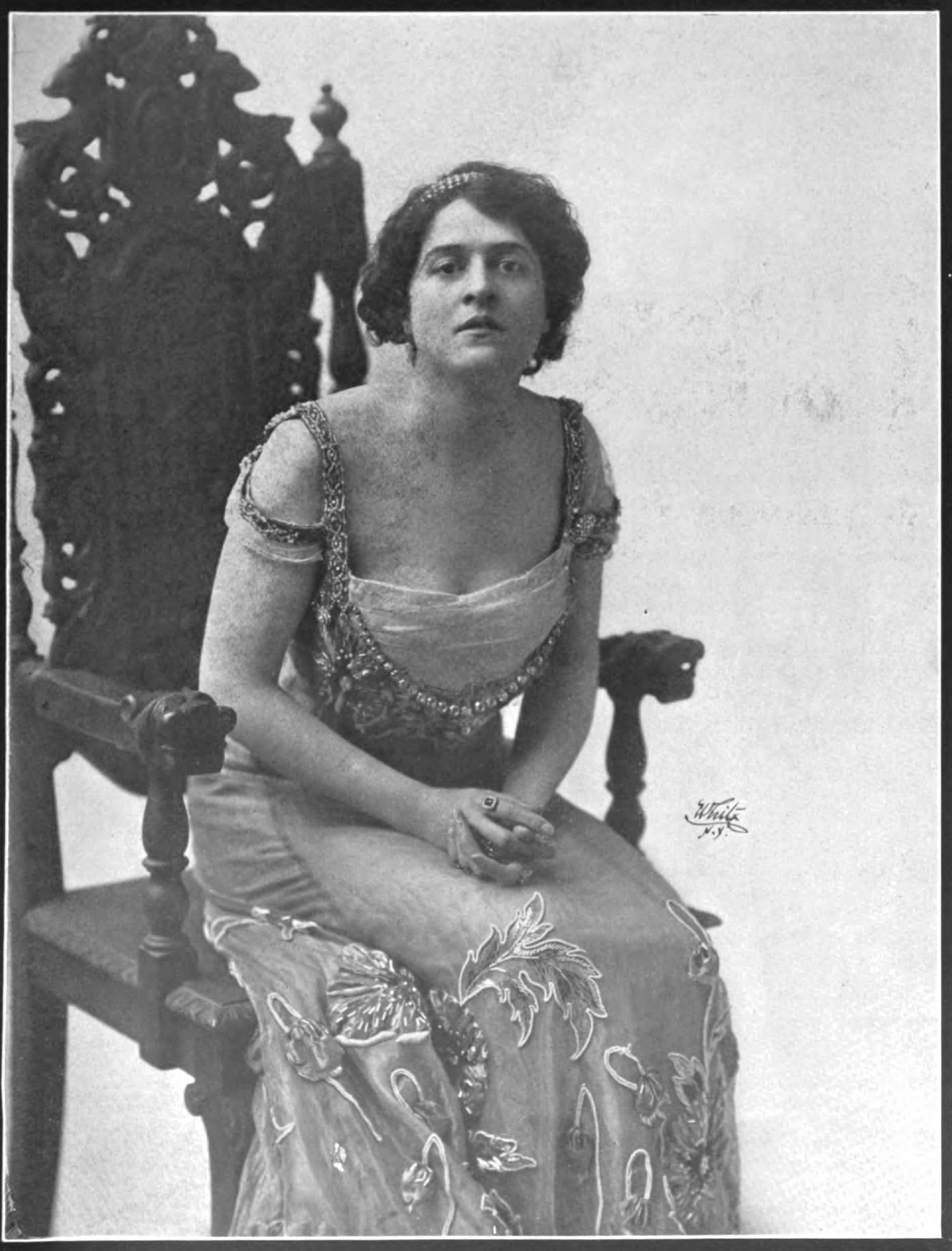

Her appearance and performance as a vampire in A Fool There Was (play) received plaudits in 1909. She lived in Australia before moving to the U.S. She also appeared on a cigarette silk for Old Mill Cigarettes.

== Filmography ==
- Your Girl and Mine: a Woman Suffrage Play (1914)
- The Winged Idol (1915)
- The Girl with Green Eyes (1916)
- Enlighten Thy Daughter (1917)
- Mama's Affair (1921)
