= The Winged Idol =

1915 film directed by Scott Sidney

- Directed by: Scott Sidney
- Written by: C. Gardner Sullivan
- Produced by: Thomas H. Ince
- Starring: Katharine Kaelred; House Peters; Clara Williams
- Cinematography: Devereaux Jennings
- Music by: Wedgwood Nowell; Joseph Nurnberger; Victor Schertzinger
- Production companies: Kay-Bee Pictures; New York Motion Picture
- Distributed by: Triangle Distributing
- Release date: December 19, 1915
- Running time: 5 reels
- Country: United States
- Languages: Silent; English intertitles

The Winged Idol is a 1915 American silent drama film directed by Scott Sidney and starring Katharine Kaelred, House Peters and Clara Williams. It was released by Triangle Film on a program alongside Allan Dwan's Jordan Is a Hard Road.

== Cast ==
- Katharine Kaelred as Countess Iva Ivanoff
- House Peters as Jack Leonard
- Clara Williams as Mildred Leonard
- Harry Keenan as Mr. Stone
- Jacob Silbert as Bodyguard
- Betty Burbridge as Nina Evers
- J. Frank Burke as Mr. Warner

== Bibliography ==
- Frederic Lombardi. Allan Dwan and the Rise and Decline of the Hollywood Studios. McFarland, 2013.
