= Robert Gleckler =

American actor (1887–1939)

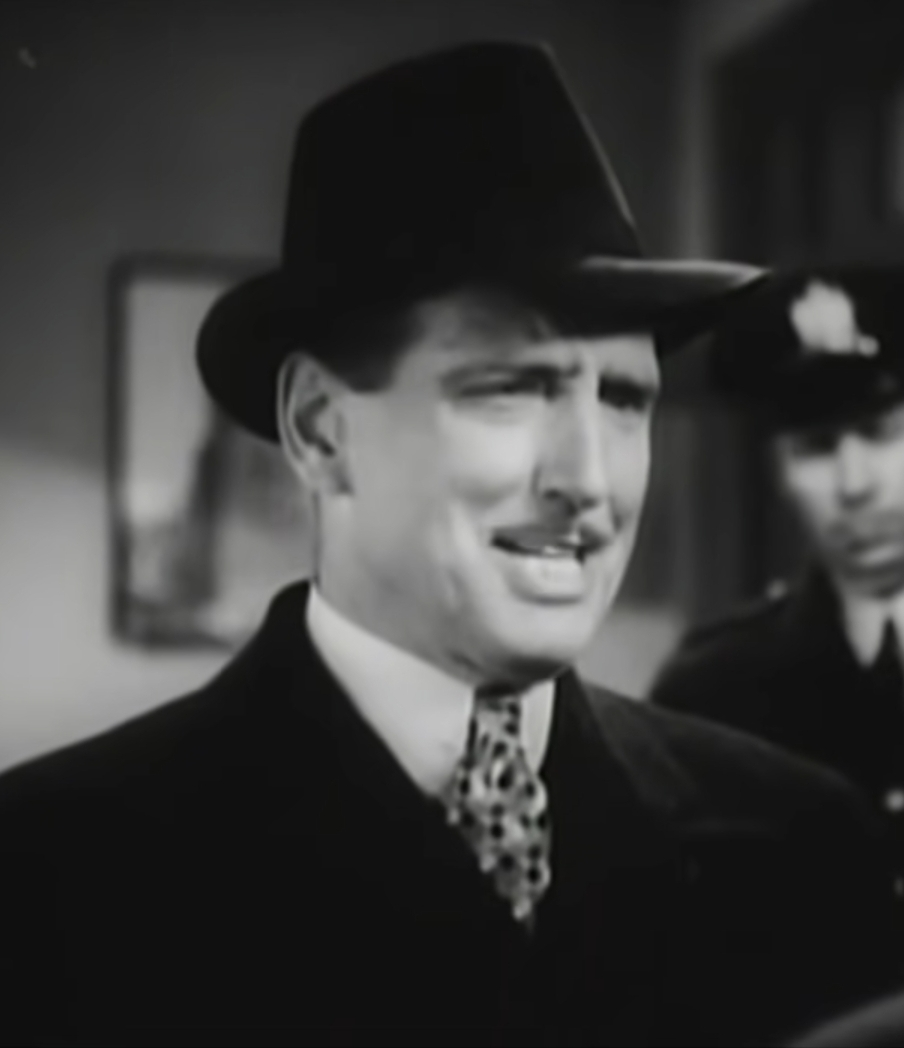
- Gleckler in Great Guy (1936)
- Born: January 11, 1887; Pierre, South Dakota, U.S.
- Died: February 25, 1939 (aged 52); Los Angeles, California, U.S.
- Resting place: Riverside Cemetery, Pierre, South Dakota
- Occupation: Actor
- Years active: 1927–1939
- Spouse: Norma Phillips (1920-1929) (div.)

Robert Gleckler (January 11, 1887 – February 25, 1939) was an American film and stage actor who appeared in nearly 60 movies between 1927 until his death in 1939. He was cast for the role of Jonas Wilkerson, overseer of the slaves at Tara in Gone with the Wind, but died during the filming and was replaced with Victor Jory.

== Selected filmography ==
- The Dove (1927) as Minor Role (uncredited)
- Mother's Boy (1929) as Gus LeGrand
- The Sea God (1930) as Big Schultz
- Big Money (1930) as Monk
- The Finger Points (1931) as Larry Haynes - Sphnix Club Manager
- Defenders of the Law (1931) as Joe Velet
- Her Bodyguard (1933) as Hood (uncredited)
- Take a Chance (1933) as Mike Caruso
- The Personality Kid (1934) as Gavin
- Now I'll Tell (1934) as Al Mossiter
- The Defense Rests (1934) as Lou Gentry
- Million Dollar Ransom (1934) as 'Doc' Carson
- Marie Galante (1934) as Steamship Captain (uncredited)
- The Great Hotel Murder (1935) as Police Captain
- The Perfect Clue (1935) as Delaney
- It Happened in New York (1935) as Venitte
- The Case of the Curious Bride (1935) as Detective Byrd
- Go Into Your Dance (1935) as Pete Brown (uncredited)
- Mister Dynamite (1935) as James V. King
- The Headline Woman (1935) as Harry Chase
- The Glass Key (1935) as Shad O'Rory
- The Daring Young Man (1935) as Editor Hooley
- Dante's Inferno (1935) as Dean
- The Farmer Takes a Wife (1935) as Fisher
- Here Comes the Band (1935) as Simmons
- Whipsaw (1935) as Steve Arnold
- Show Them No Mercy! (1935) as Gus Hansen
- Too Tough to Kill (1935) as Bill Anderson
- Absolute Quiet (1936) as Jasper Cowdray
- Forgotten Faces (1936) as Mike Davidson
- Yours for the Asking (1936) as Slick Doran
- I'd Give My Life (1936) as Buck Gordon
- Love Begins at 20 (1936) as Gangster Mugsy O'Bannon
- Sworn Enemy (1936) as Hinkle
- The Girl on the Front Page (1936) as Bill
- North of Nome (1936) as Bruno
- Great Guy (1936) as Marty Cavanaugh
- King of Gamblers (1937) as Ed Merkil
- Wings Over Honolulu (1937) as Squadron Lieutenant Commander (uncredited)
- Pick a Star (1937) as Head Waiter
- The Man Who Cried Wolf (1937) as Capt. Walter Reid
- Hot Water (1937) as Hal Lynch
- Bulldog Drummond's Revenge (1937) as Hardcasle
- The Bad Man of Brimstone (1937) as Tom 'Skunk' Rogers (uncredited)
- Gun Law (1938) as Flash Arnold
- Rascals (1938) as Police Lieutenant
- Gangs of New York (1938) as Nolan
- Alexander's Ragtime Band (1938) as Eddie
- Little Miss Broadway (1938) as Detective
- Boys Town (1938) as Mr. Reynolds (uncredited)
- Fugitives for a Night (1938) as J. G. McGee (uncredited)
- Tarnished Angel (1938) as Checkers - Casino Owner (uncredited)
- Orphans of the Street (1938) as Hughes
- Ride a Crooked Mile (1938) as Prison Warden
- Stand Up and Fight (1939) as Sheriff Barney
- They Made Me a Criminal (1939) as Doc Ward (final film role)

== Bibliography ==
- Solomon, Aubrey. The Fox Film Corporation, 1915-1935: A History and Filmography. McFarland, 2011.
