= Henry Russell Miller =

Henry Russell Miller (1880–1955) was an author and lawyer in the United States. He wrote novels. His books The Ambition of Mark Truitt and House of Toys were adapted into films.

The Bellman gave a favorable review of The Ambition of Mark Truitt.

== Writings ==
- The Ambition of Mark Truitt
- The Man Higher Up (1910)
- His Rise to Power
- House of Toys (1914)
- The First Division (1920)
- Views of Old Pittsburgh: A Portfolio of the Past (1932), editor

== Filmography ==
- Fruits of Desire (1916) based on The Ambition of Mark Truitt
- The House of Toys (1920)
