= Fruits of Desire =

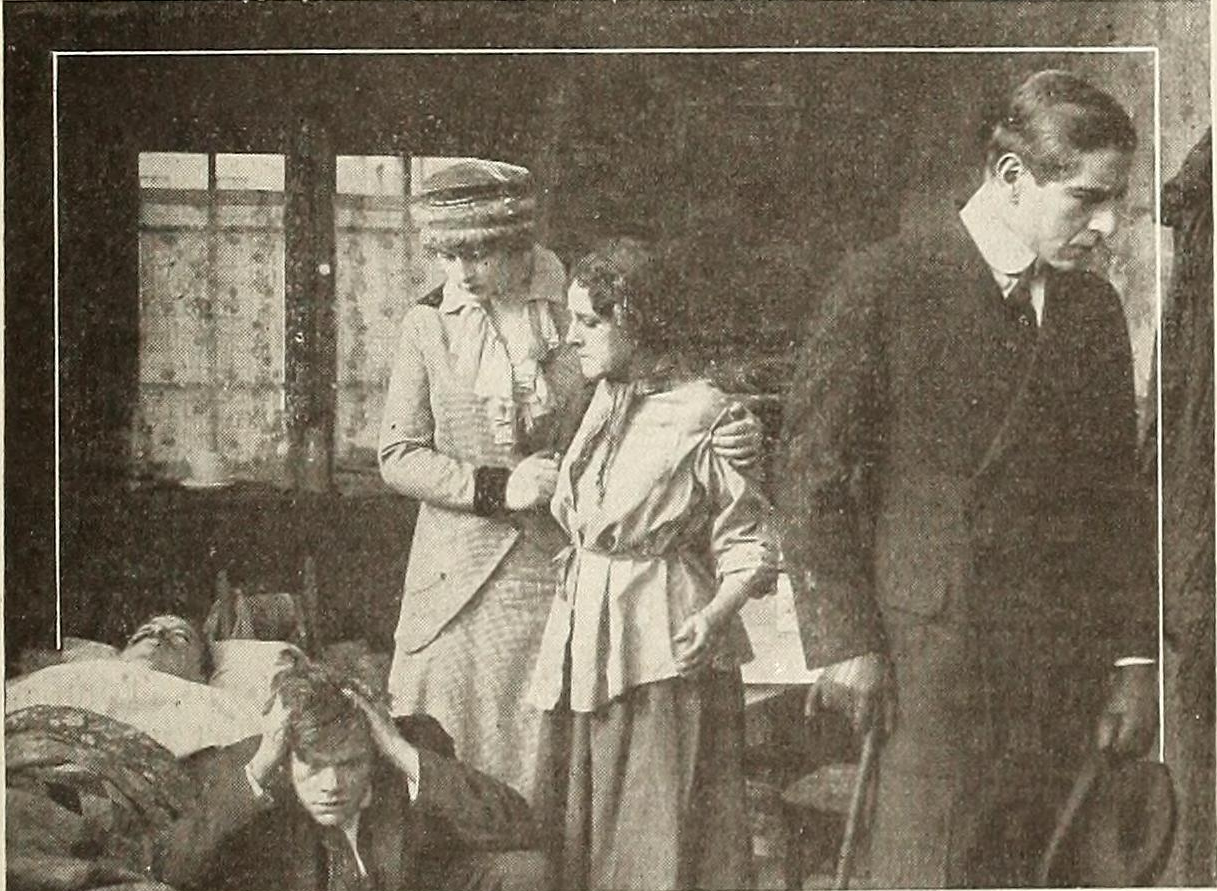
- Directed by: Oscar Eagle
- Based on: The Ambition of Mark Truitt by Henry Russell Miller
- Starring: Robert Warwick; Madlaine Traverse
- Cinematography: Sol Polito
- Production companies: William A. Brady Picture Plays, Inc.
- Distributed by: World Film Company
- Release date: January 31, 1916
- Running time: 5 reels
- Country: USA
- Language: Silent (English intertitles)

Fruits of Desire is a lost 1916 American silent drama film directed by Oscar Eagle, based on Henry Russell Miller's novel The Ambition of Mark Truitt. The film stars Robert Warwick, Madlaine Traverse, and Alec B. Francis. It was produced by William A. Brady Picture Plays, Inc. and distributed by World Film Company.

== Plot ==
Mark Truitt dreams of becoming the head of the steel industry, and envisions his steel mill looming over his hometown. He kisses his sweetheart goodbye and leaves for Pittsburgh, where he gains employment at a steel mill.

He starts at the most grueling laborer, but quickly rises through the ranks to become a skilled worker. He boards with the shop foreman, and his daughter, Kazia, falls in love with him, but ignores her as he forms his own company in his hometown. He marries his old sweetheart and constructs a massive steel mill, though she becomes a shallow social butterfly and they grow estranged, then divorced.

Living alone in his mansion, he is confronted with how empty his life is, and seeks out Kazia and finds that she still loves him. Her disabled brother attempts to kill him and blow up his mills, but he is thwarted and the two lovers are married.

== Cast ==
- Robert Warwick as Mark Truitt
- Madlaine Traverse as Kazia
- Dorothy Fairchild as Unity
- Robert Cummings as Thomas Henley
- Alec B. Francis as Jeremiah Quimby
- Ralph Delmore as Roman Androskia
- D.J. Flannigan as Blair
- James Mack as Piotr
- James Ewens as Gracy
- Adolphe Lestina as Rev. Courtenay
- Philip Basi as Dr. Graham
- George Moss as Simon Truitt
- Harry C. Weir as Bill Slocum
- Ezra Walck as Houlahan
- Adolph Parina as Marcel
- Harry De Vere as Johann
- Julia Stuart as Hanka
- Phillis Haseltine as Mrs. Henley
- Mildred Havens as Susan Martin

== Production ==
Fruits of Desire was partially filmed on location in Savannah, Georgia and at the United States Steel Corporation steel mill in Pittsburgh, Pennsylvania. The film went under several different working titles, including: The Ambition of Mark Truitt and The Quest Eternal.

== Reception ==
The Film Daily review was mixed, as the reviewer found the story to be an "elementary melodrama and at times it will drag rather badly." The reviewer also believed that the film's frequent steel mill scenes were being used to pad out the film to 5 reels, stating that "the showing of the interior of a steel mill is no longer the novelty that it would have been a few years ago." They also criticized Madlaine Traverse's performance as being "ill at ease and stiff in her movements," and said that she detracted from many otherwise good scenes. In the finals scenes of the film, searching for a bomb, the reviewer noted that the resulting explosion "would hardly have been sufficient to destroy more than one shed, let alone the tremendous group of buildings."

Moving Picture World reviewer Lynde Denig said the film "lacks dramatic strength" but was otherwise of "average merit."

Motion Picture News reviewer Peter Milne found the construction of the story to be "fragmentary" and give the film an episodic nature. The reviewer enjoyed the educational nature of the steel mill scenes, which were interspersed between dramatic scenes.

Variety described the cast as being "uniformly excellent."

== Preservation ==
With no holdings located in archives, Fruits of Desire is considered a lost film.
