= Oscar Eagle =

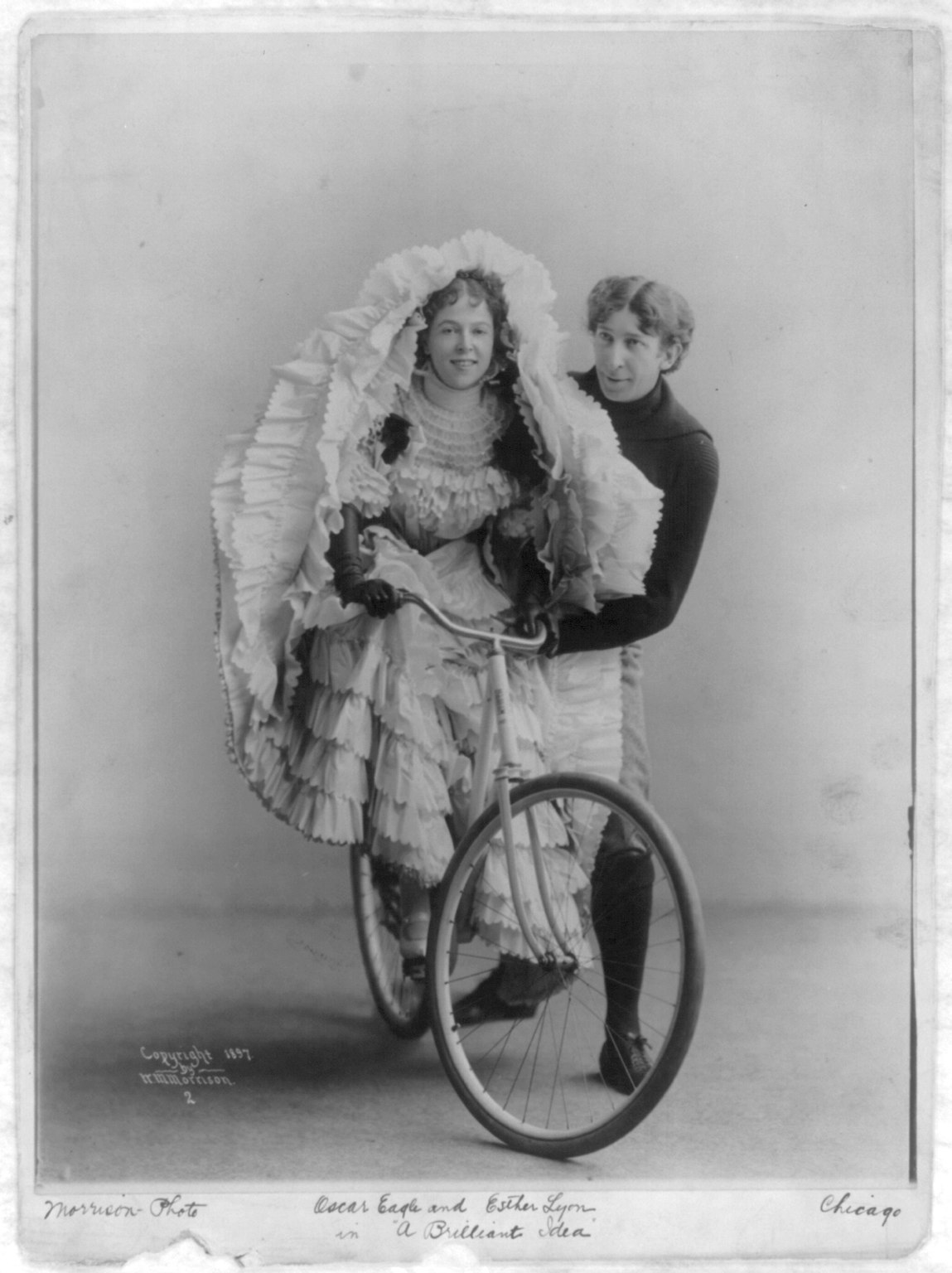

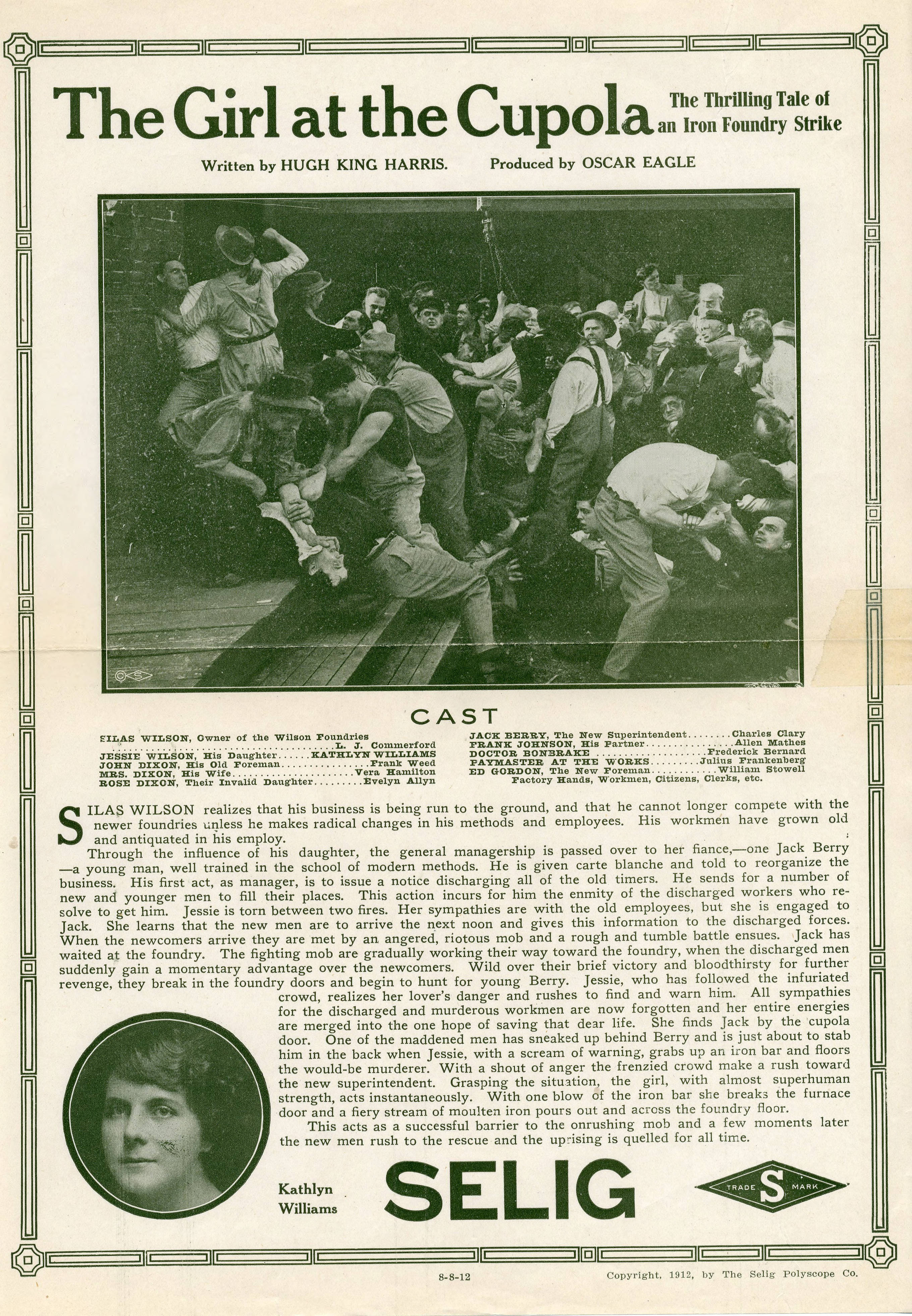

Oscar Eagle (January 21, 1861-March 14, 1930) was a director of theatrical productions and films in the United States. He was also an actor.

Eagle was born in Gallipolis, Ohio.

He worked for Famous Players and Selig Polyscope film companies.

The New York Public Library has a photo of a young Eagle in costume.

== Theater ==
- Mrs. Wiggs of the Cabbage Patch (1904)
- Sometime (1918), director
- The Melting of Molly (1918) (Melting of Molly is a book by Maria Thompson Daviess)
- Wildflower (1923), director
- The Cocoanuts (1925)
- Animal Crackers (1928)
- Houseboat on the Styx (1928) (the fantasy novel A House-Boat on the Styx was published in 1895)

== Filmography ==
- The Laird's Daughter (1912) producer
- The Miller of Burgundy (1912), producer
- The Girl at the Cupola (1912), director (extant film)
- Arabia The Equine Detective (1913)
- Our Mutual Girl (1914)
- The Royal Box (1914)
- The Little Mademoiselle (1915)
- The Dictator (1915)
- The Sins of Society (1915)
- The Cotton King (1915)
- Runaway June
- Fruits of Desire (1916)
- The Frozen Warning (1917)
