= The Man Higher Up =

1910 novel by Henry Russell Miller

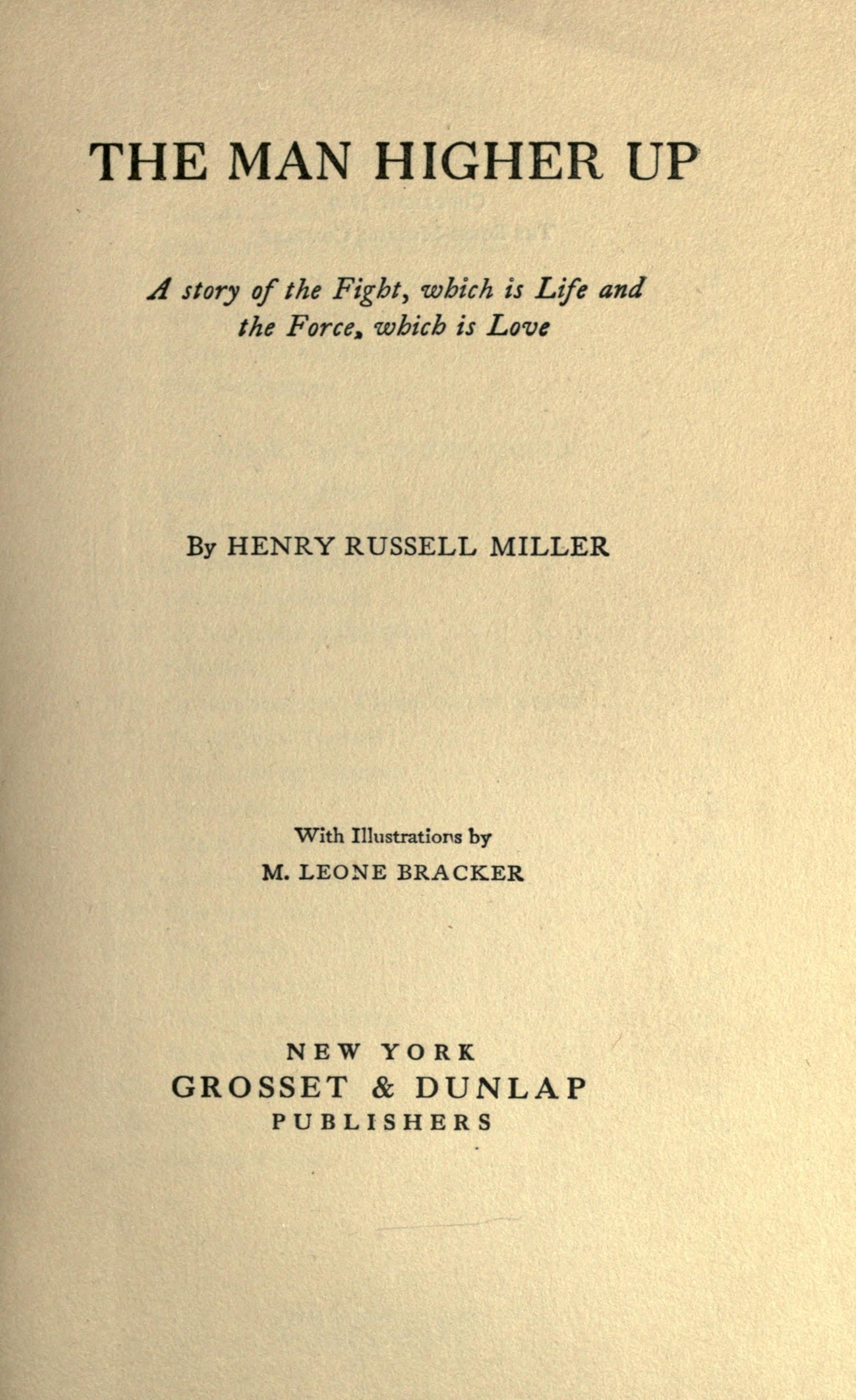
- Title page for The Man Higher Up: A Story of the Fight Which Is Life and the Force Which Is Love (1910)
- Author: Henry Russell Miller
- Language: English
- Genre: Novel
- Publisher: Bobbs-Merrill
- Publication date: 1910
- Publication place: United States
- Media type: Print (hardback)
- Pages: 402
- OCLC: 6563281
- Followed by: His Rise To Power

The Man Higher Up: A Story of the Fight Which Is Life and the Force Which Is Love is a novel by the American writer Henry Russell Miller set in 19th century Pittsburgh, Pennsylvania.

The novel tells the Horatio Alger story of Bob, an Irish-Catholic tenement waif who becomes a mill hand, a ward heeler, then mayor of Pittsburgh, and finally governor of Pennsylvania.
