= The Girl at the Cupola =

1912 film

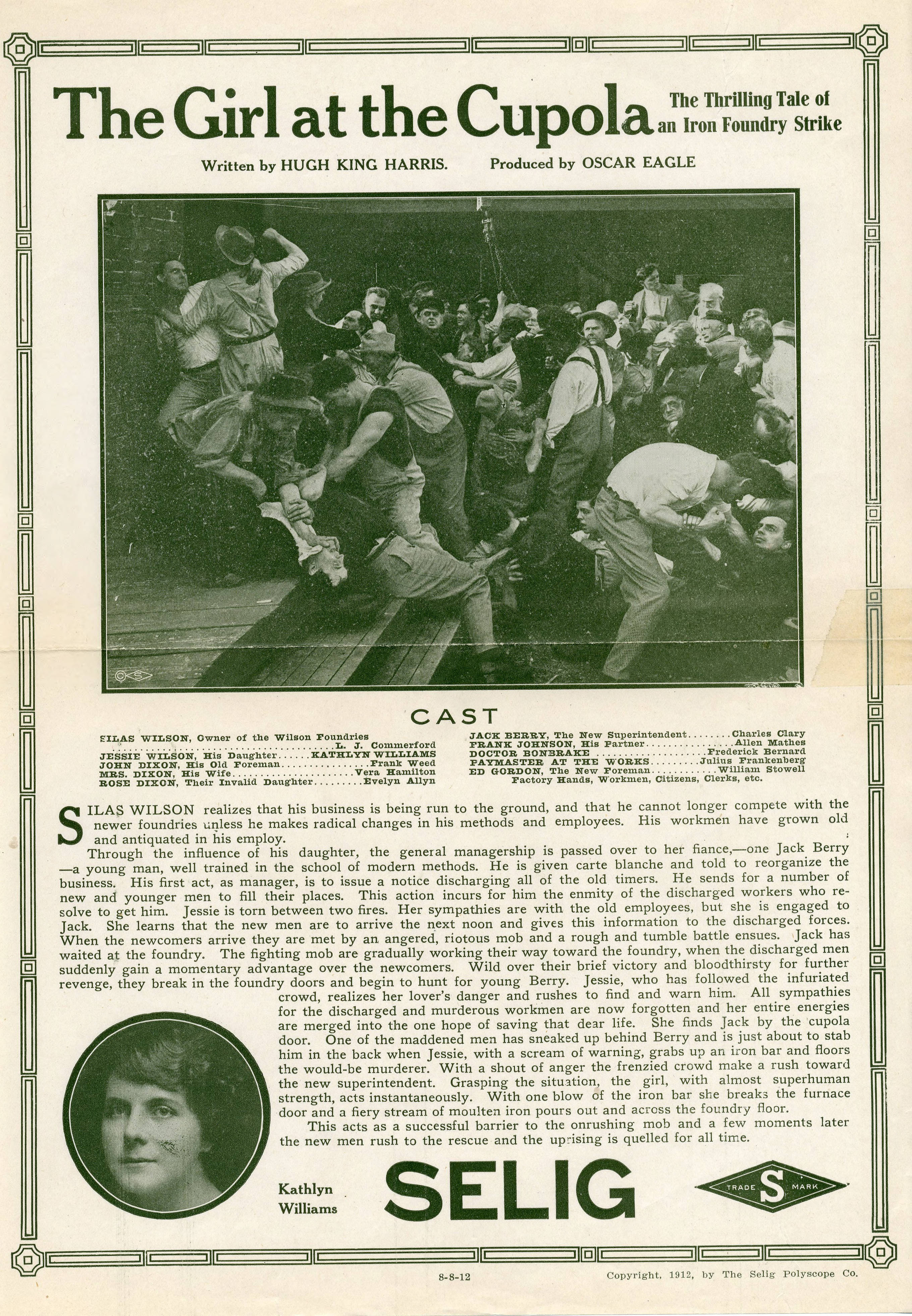
- Directed by: Oscar Eagle
- Written by: Hugh King Harris
- Produced by: William Selig
- Starring: Kathlyn Williams
- Distributed by: General Film Company; Harpodeon, 2010 DVD; Grapevine Video, VHS (USA)
- Release date: August 8, 1912
- Running time: short; 1 reel
- Country: USA
- Language: English intertitles

The Girl at the Cupola is a 1912 American silent short film produced by the Selig Polyscope Company. It was directed by Oscar Eagle and featured Kathlyn Williams.

A copy survives in the Library of Congress collection. The film is also on home video/dvd.

== Cast ==
- Kathlyn Williams - Jessie Wilson
- Thomas Commerford - Silas Wilson, Jessie's Father (*billed as T. J. Commerford)
- Charles Clary - Jack Berry
- Frank Weed - John Dixon
- Vera Hamilton - Mrs. John Dixon
- Evelyn Allen - Rose Dixon
- Allen Mathes - Frank Johnson
- Frederick Bernard - Dr. Bonbrake (*billed Fred Bernard)
- Julius Frankenburg - The Paymaster
- William Stowell - Ed Gordon, new Foreman
