= Rachel Barton Butler =

American writer, lyricist, and playwright

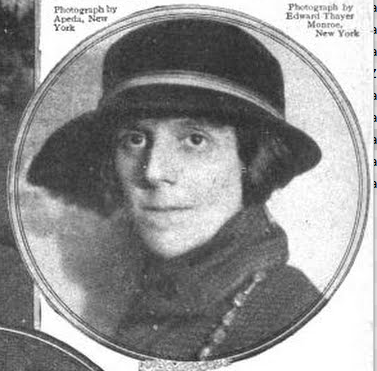
- Born: 1880s Cincinnati, Ohio, U.S.
- Died: November 24, 1920; New York City, New York, U.S.
- Occupation: Playwright

Rachel Barton Butler (born in the mid-1880s – November 24, 1920) was an American writer, lyricist, and playwright.

== Early life ==
Rachel Barton Butler was born in Cincinnati, Ohio (sources vary on the date, either 1883 or 1888), the daughter of Edward Smith Butler and Lily Lovell Butler. She graduated from the University of Cincinnati. She acted and worked in theatre for a time, then pursued further studies at Radcliffe College, where she was part of the drama workshop under George Pierce Baker. Her play, Prudence in Particular, won the MacDowell Club Fellowship competition in 1915. Another play, Mama's Affair, won the $500 Morosco Prize for a play written by a Harvard or Radcliffe student of Baker's. A third student play of hers, Francois-Amour (a one-act "fantasie in rhymed couplets"), won a Harvard Dramatic Club competition in 1916.

== Career ==
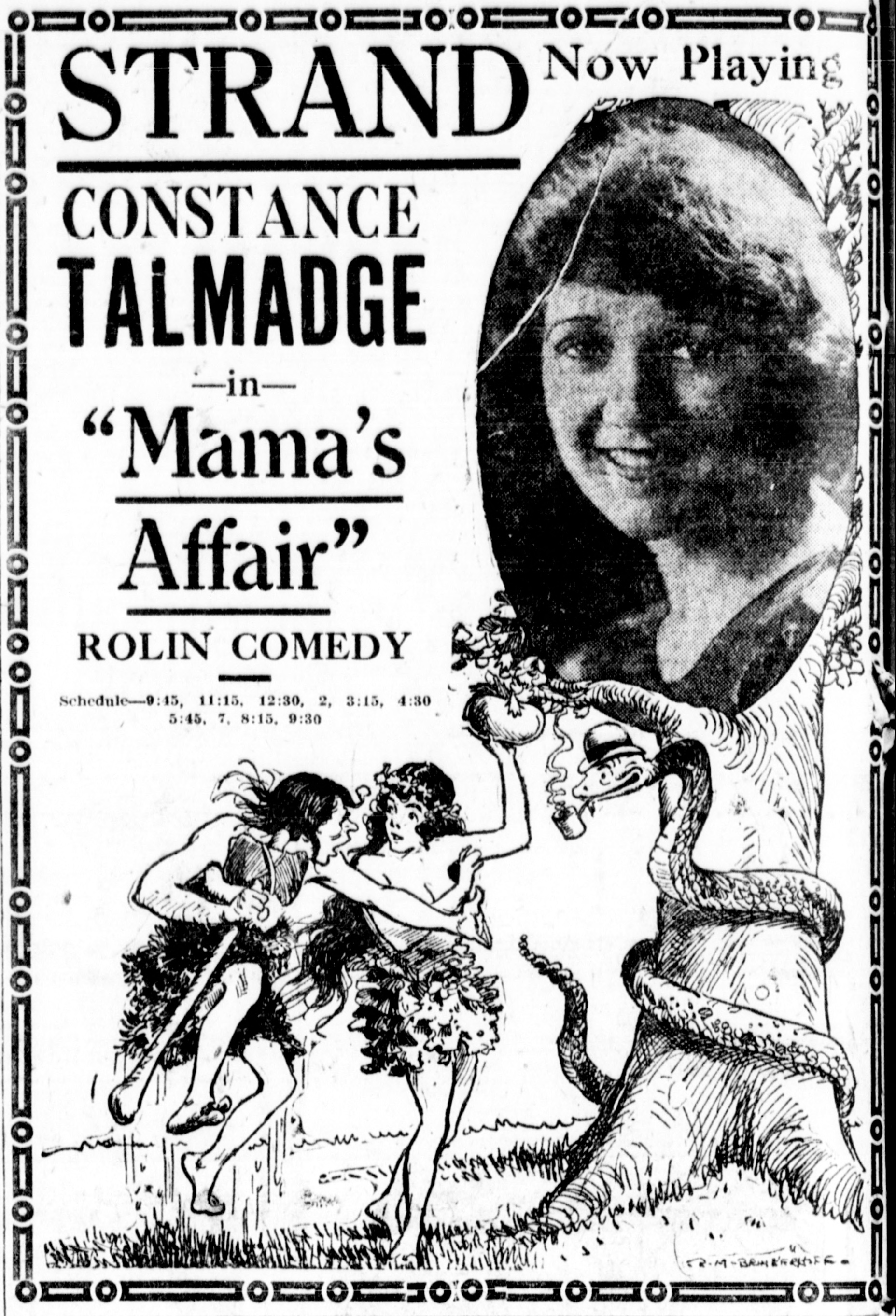
Advertisement for Mama's Affair (1921 film)

Butler wrote the verses for Songs and Shadow Pictures for the Child World (1909), which included music composed by Jessie Gaynor and cut-paper illustrations by Susanne Fenimore Tyndale. She was credited as lyricist in the sheet music for "Baby Clover" (1906), with music by Charles Willeby, sung by Australian Ada Crossley. Her poem "March Violets" appeared in The Cavalier (March 1909).

In 1920, Butler's comedy Mama's Affair ran on Broadway for four months, produced by Oliver Morosco and starring Amelia Bingham, Robert Edeson, Katherine Kaelred, George Le Guere, and Effie Shannon. The following year, the show was adapted into a silent film, with some of the same cast, but with Constance Talmadge and Gertrude Le Brandt also appearing. Butler wrote at least three other plays, West of Omaha (a one-act farce), Mom and The Lap-Dog. She adapted Alice in Wonderland for a 1920 children's production starring Mabel Taliaferro, a fundraiser for the New York Kindergarten Association.

Butler's works were adapted into two other silent films, Must We Marry? (1928) and Broken Hearted (1929).

== Personal life ==
Rachel Barton Butler married actor Boyd Agin in 1919. She died suddenly in Greenwich, Connecticut late in 1920, in her thirties.
