= The First Woman Jury in America =

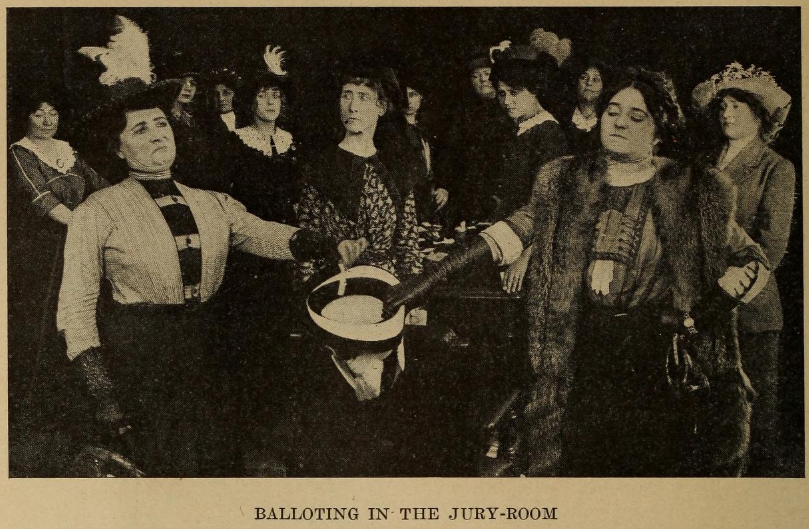
- Story by: Alma Webster Hall Powell
- Starring: John Bunny; Flora Finch; Earle Williams
- Production company: Vitagraph Studios
- Release date: March 11, 1912

The First Woman Jury in America is a 1912 American silent film. It was written by suffragist Alma Webster Hall Powell, and produced by Vitagraph Studios. It stars John Bunny, Flora Finch, and Earle Williams. It is notable for being one of the first films about suffrage written by a suffragist. The scenario was published in full, with images from the film, in The Moving Picture World, March 9, 1912.

== Plot ==
A newspaper editor chooses an all-female jury when he stands trial.

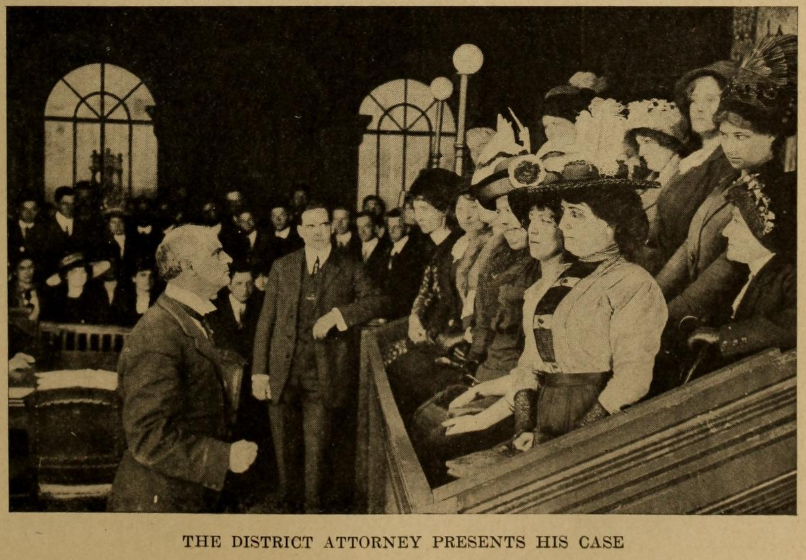
Still from the film

A young California newspaper editor is arrested. At his trial he has the privilege of a male or female jury. He chooses a female panel. Among those drawn and selected are Priscilla Simpkins, a spinster, and Matilda Jones, a suffragette. The young scribe knows his attractiveness will appeal to the jury. Both Priscilla and Matilda try to win his attention. After the case is given to the twelve women, they retire to the jury room for deliberation. They are all decided that the accused is not guilty but Priscilla and Matilda insist upon being the forewoman of the jury, bringing about a squabble. The deputy sheriff enters the jury room and brings about a reconciliation between the two "scrappers." He leads them into the court room. Priscilla makes known their verdict of "not guilty." As the editor advances toward Matilda, she clasps him in her arms while he winces under the ordeal. The judge raps for order and the sheriff politely bows the jury out of the court room, after the judge has dismissed the prisoner.
