= Too Tough to Kill =

1935 film

- Film poster
- Directed by: D. Ross Lederman
- Written by: Lester Cole; Griffin Jay; Robert D. Speers
- Starring: Victor Jory
- Cinematography: George Meehan
- Edited by: Gene Milford
- Distributed by: Columbia Pictures
- Release date: December 20, 1935
- Running time: 58 minutes
- Country: United States
- Language: English

Too Tough to Kill is a 1935 American drama film directed by D. Ross Lederman and starring Victor Jory.

== Cast ==
- Victor Jory as John O'Hara
- Sally O'Neil as Ann Miller
- Johnny Arthur as Willie Dent
- Robert Gleckler as Bill Anderson
- Monte Carter as Tony (miner)
- Ward Bond as Danny (dynamite foreman)
- Frank Rice as Swede Mulhauser (miner-henchman)
- Dewey Robinson as Shane (shaft foreman-henchman)
- Eddy Chandler as Joe, Mixer Operator-Henchman)
- George McKay as Nick Pollack (dynamite handler-henchman)
- Thurston Hall as Whitney (mine owner)
- Jonathan Hale as chairman of the Board
