= For the Cause of Suffrage =

- Produced by: Gaston Méliès
- Starring: Francis Ford
- Production company: Méliès
- Distributed by: Enterprise Optical Company; Star-Film
- Release date: October 20, 1909

For the Cause of Suffrage is a 1909 silent comedy film. It stars Francis Ford. It was produced by Gaston Méliès and copyrighted by Georges Méliès.

== Plot ==
Mr. Duff dresses as a woman and infiltrates a women's suffrage meeting.

== See also ==
- Women's suffrage in film
