= 80 Million Women Want–? =

80 Million Women Want—?
- Directed by: Will Louis
- Written by: B. P. Schulberg; Florence Maule Cooley (story); Lotta Woods (titles)
- Starring: Ethel Jewett; Robert Everett; George Henry
- Edited by: Harry L. Decker
- Production company: Unique Film Co.
- Release date: November 22, 1913
- Running time: 56 minutes
- Country: United States
- Language: Silent (English intertitles)

80 Million Women Want—? (alternate title: What 80 Million Women Want) is a 1913 American silent melodrama film. It was produced by Unique Film Co. in partnership with the Women's Political Union. The film featured cameos by prominent suffragists, including Emmeline Pankhurst and Harriot Stanton Blatch. A print exists in the Classic Film Exchange film library.

== See also ==
- Women's suffrage in film
