= The Suffragette's Dream =

Silent comedy film

- Le rêve d'une féministe
- Production company: Pathé-Frères
- Release date: 1909
- Running time: 124 minutes
- Country: France

The Suffragette's Dream (French: Le rêve d'une féministe) is a 1909 French silent comedy film produced by Pathé-Frères.

== Plot ==
A housewife falls asleep and dreams of a world in which gender roles are reversed. She attends a suffrage meeting, where the women denounce men. In a park, men are seen taking care of children and crocheting. A female streetcleaner turns the hose on a man, who is then arrested by two female cops. When the wife wakes up from her dream, her husband is enraged to find that she has not prepared dinner, and he beats her.

== Influences ==
The Suffragette's Dream is an example of suffragette physical comedy, a type of slapstick which exploited growing concerns over the change in traditional gender roles and social norms in the suffrage era.
