= Votes for Women (film) =

- Directed by: Hal Reid
- Written by: Mary Ware Dennett; Harriet Laidlaw; Frances Maule Bjorkman
- Starring: Edgena De Lespine; Gertrude Robinson; Sue Balfour
- Production company: Reliance Film Company
- Release date: June 26, 1912

Votes for Women is a 1912 American silent melodrama film directed by Hal Reid. It was produced by Reliance Film Company in partnership with the National American Woman Suffrage Association and was written by suffragists Mary Ware Dennett, Harriet Laidlaw, and Frances Maule Bjorkman. The film starred Edgena De Lespine, and featured cameos by prominent suffragists, including Anna Howard Shaw, Jane Addams, and Inez Milholland, and incorporated documentary footage of a women's suffrage parade in New York City. It was named by historian Kevin Brownlow as “the first important suffrage film.”

The film was released just 20 days after the first suffrage movement-produced film, Suffrage and the Man, a romantic comedy centering on a young man who goes from being troubled by his fiancée's interest in women's rights to supportive of her empowerment. As reported by Motion Picture News in 1911, "the suffragettes in this city...[recently] decided that motion picture films should be made showing the suffrage cause in the best light" since "this was the best way in which thousands of people might be instructed who otherwise would never hear of the suffrage cause."

Similarly to Suffrage and the Man, Votes for Women features an engaged couple, Senator Herman and Jane Wadsworth, in order to show that "woman suffrage and romance could coexist."

== Plot ==
A social worker, May Fillmore, discovers a tenement family of four children left alone after their father dies of tuberculosis brought on by unsafe housing conditions, after having vainly importuned the owner, Senator Herman, to remedy unsatisfactory conditions in the building. She goes to the Senator's fiancée, Jane Wadsworth, and succeeds in securing her help. Jane accompanies May to the poor bereaved family, and she is shocked at the terrible lack of sanitation. They find three little girls and a baby left to fight the world alone. Elsie, the eldest, is doing embroidery sweat-shop work at home, and minding the baby, while Hester works in a department store. The other tot is a half-time scholar, and in the afternoons assists her sister working on corset covers for another shop. All these fearful conditions are pointed out by May and have their desired effect upon Jane. She is further shocked upon learning that her fiancé is the negligent owner. Jane goes to him and pleads that he do something in the matter. He waves her away and treats her like a child. Angered, she joins the suffragists and assists in bringing both her father and the Senator to terms. Hester is insulted by a floorwalker in her father's shop, which proves another shock to Jane, when her father does nothing in the matter. Later she is stricken with scarlet fever, which she contracted from the embroidery on one of her trousseau gowns, which came from her father's store. The father and Senator, upon learning that they were in part guilty, as the embroidery was made in the Senator's unsanitary tenement, gives in and most enthusiastically joins the suffrage movement. They are seen with the girls at suffrage headquarters, at the Men's League, and finally in the parade.

== See also ==
- Women's suffrage in film
