= Our Mutual Girl =

1914 American film serial

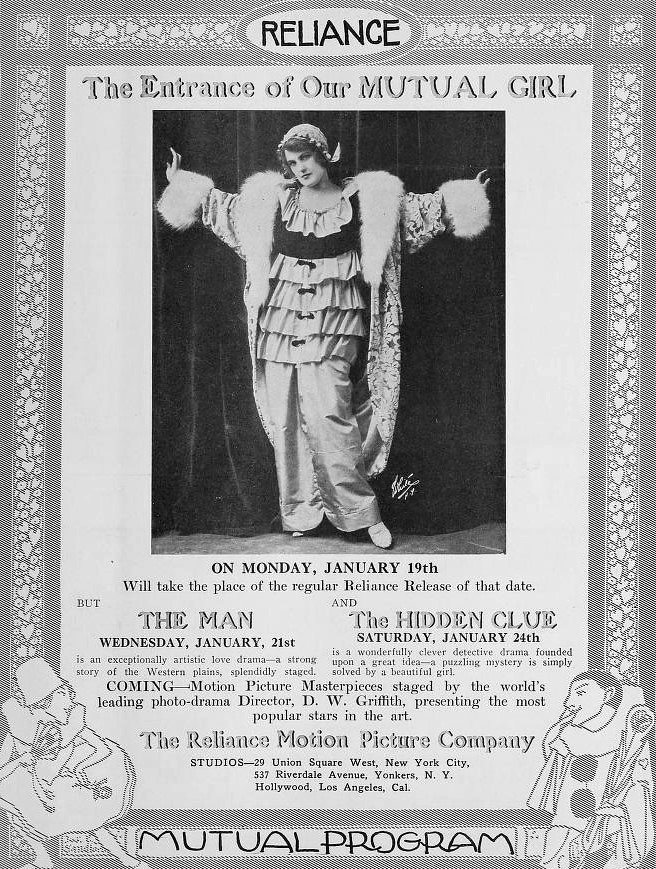
- Directed by: John W. Noble; Oscar Eagle; Lawrence B. McGill; Walter Stanhope
- Written by: Irvin S. Cobb; Carolyn Wells; Arthur James
- Starring: Norma Phillips
- Production company: Reliance Motion Picture Company
- Distributed by: Mutual Film
- Release date: January 19, 1914 (first installment)

Our Mutual Girl is a 1914 American film serial shown in weekly installments, starring Norma Phillips. It was created by Mutual Film to be an alternative to "stunt-driven, wild-animal wrestling" serials such as The Perils of Pauline.

Our Mutual Girl ran for 52 weekly installments. Most installments featured cameos by notable figures from the worlds of politics, sports, entertainment, business and art. The serial was "provided free to exhibitors as the figurehead for the Mutual program of one-reel, two-reel and serial films, forming a trademark for the exchange as a whole." It is an example of early national advertising that was specifically targeted to women consumers.

== Plot ==
Margaret, known as "our Mutual girl," travels from the country to New York City to stay with her wealthy aunt. Over the course of the serial, she is transformed into a "society belle," introduced to notable society figures, and taught how to dress and act to fit into her aunt's world.

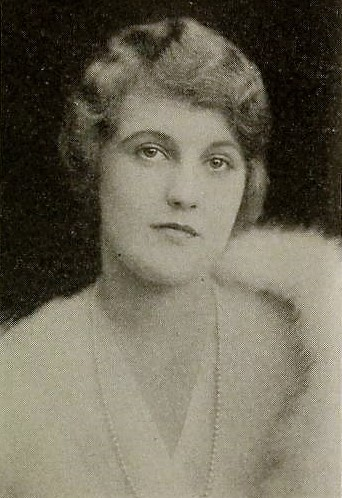
Norma Phillips starred as Margaret, "our Mutual girl"

== Cast ==
- Norma Phillips as Margaret, our Mutual girl
- J. W. Johnston as Jack Stuyvescent
- Grace Fisher as Aunt Abbie
- Mayme Kelso as Mrs. James Knickerbocker
- Madge Tyrone as Travers’ sister
- Evelyn Dumo as Margaret's maid
- Jessie Lewis as Lewis, Mrs. Knickerbocker's maid
- James Alling as Mrs. Knickerbocker's butler
- Edward Brennan as Howard Dunbar

== Notable cameo appearances ==
- Andrew J. Carnegie (installment 5)
- Harriot Stanton Blatch (installment 7)
- Alfred Baldwin Sloane (installment 7)
- Inez Milholland (installments 7 and 18)
- Elaine Hammerstein (installment 9)
- Dorothy Dix (installment 9)
- Stella Mayhew (installment 9)
- Charles Comiskey (installment 10)
- Mike Donlin (installment 10)
- Larry Doyle (installment 10)
- John J. Gleason (installment 10)
- John McGraw (installment 10)
- John Cyril Porte (installments 10 and 29)
- Walter Damrosch (installments 10 and 15)
- Edward Evans, 1st Baron Mountevans
- Bruce McRae (installment 12)
- Elsie de Wolfe (installment 13)
- John Murphy Farley (installment 13)
- John Purroy Mitchel (installment 13)
- Katharine Bement Davis (installment 18)
- Mitzi Hajos (installment 18)
- Georg Brandes (installment 20)
- Florence Reed (installment 20)
- Arthur Conan Doyle (installments 22 and 23)
- Dudley Field Malone (installment 23)
- Irvin S. Cobb (installments 24 and 33)
- Dolly Sisters (installment 28)
- John Philip Sousa (installment 29)
- Daniel Frohman (installment 30)
- James Montgomery Flagg (installments 32 and 51)
- William Henry Irwin (installment 33)
- Margaret Vale (installment 33)
- Rose O'Neill (installment 35)
- John Hays Hammond (installment 35)
- Robert Livingston Beeckman (installment 36)
- Alfred Wagstaff Jr. (installment 42)
- James Fairman Fielder (installment 43)
- Douglas Fairbanks (installment 47)
- William Faversham (installment 48)
- George Barr McCutcheon (installment 49)
- May Wilson Preston (installment 50)
- August Belmont Jr.
- Billie Burke
- Glenn Curtiss (installment 29)
- George Samuel Dougherty
- Otto Hermann Kahn
- Laurette Taylor
- William Cowper
