= Mama's Affair (1921 film) =

1921 film by Victor Fleming

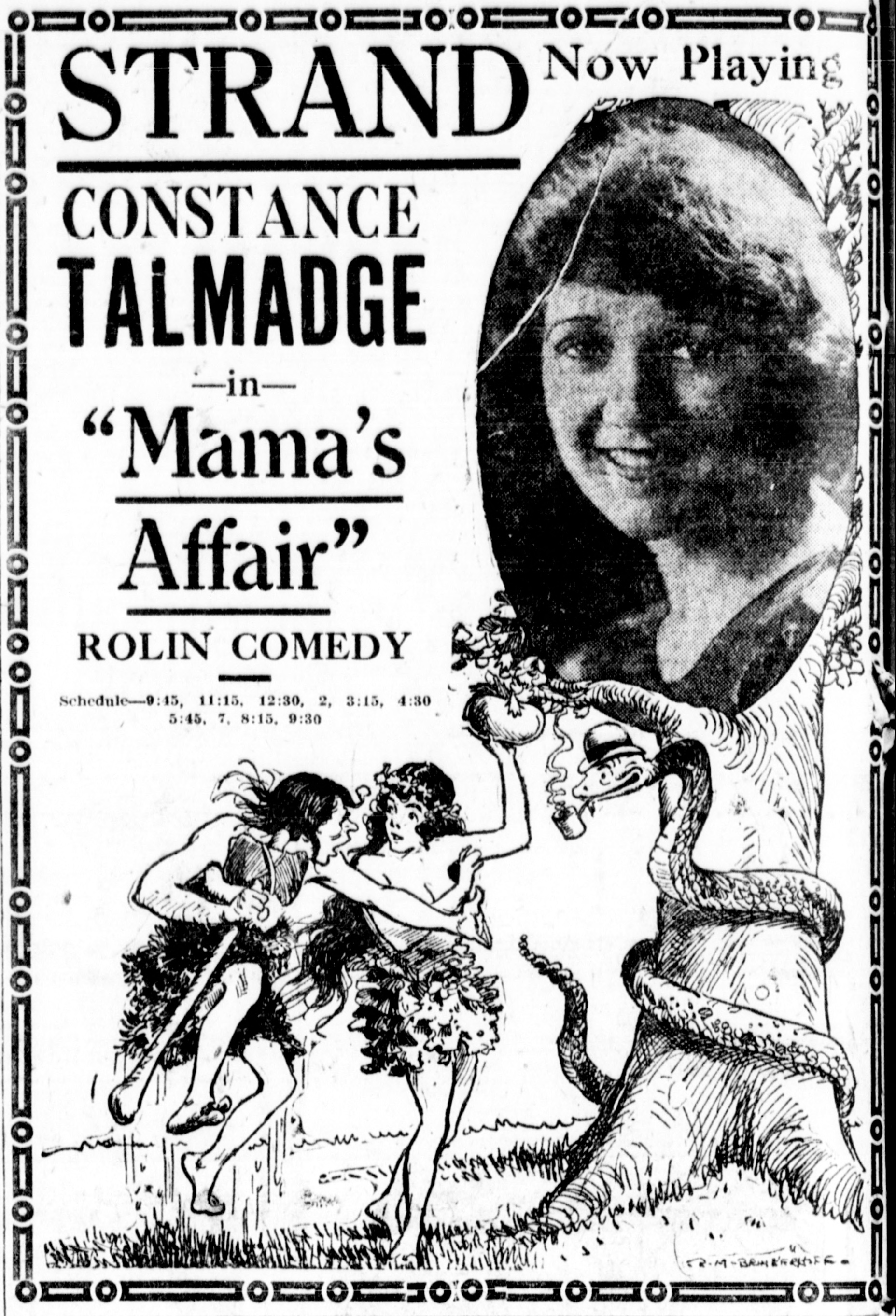
- Newspaper advertisement for the play.
- Directed by: Victor Fleming
- Written by: John Emerson; Anita Loos
- Based on: Mama's Affair by Rachel Barton Butler
- Produced by: Joseph M. Schenck
- Starring: Constance Talmadge; Effie Shannon
- Cinematography: Oliver Marsh
- Distributed by: Associated First National Pictures
- Release date: January 23, 1921
- Running time: 60 min., 6 reels; 5,950 feet
- Country: United States
- Language: Silent

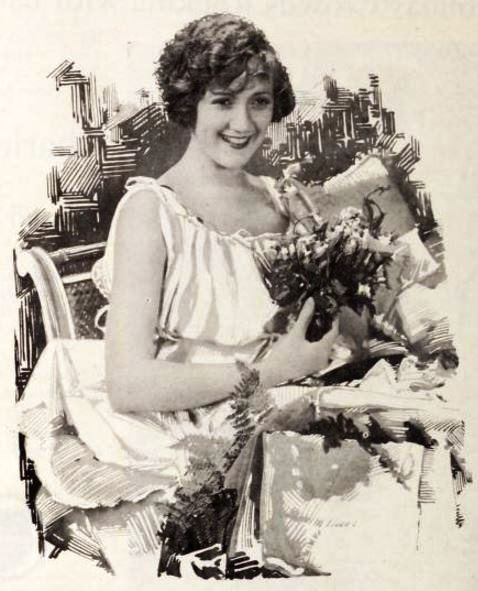
Constance Talmadge

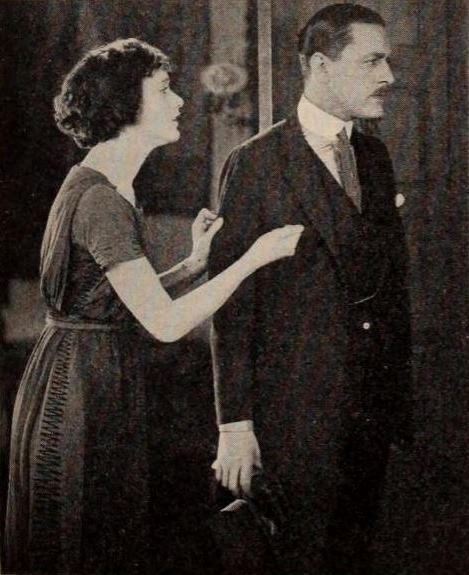
Constance Talmadge and Kenneth Harlan

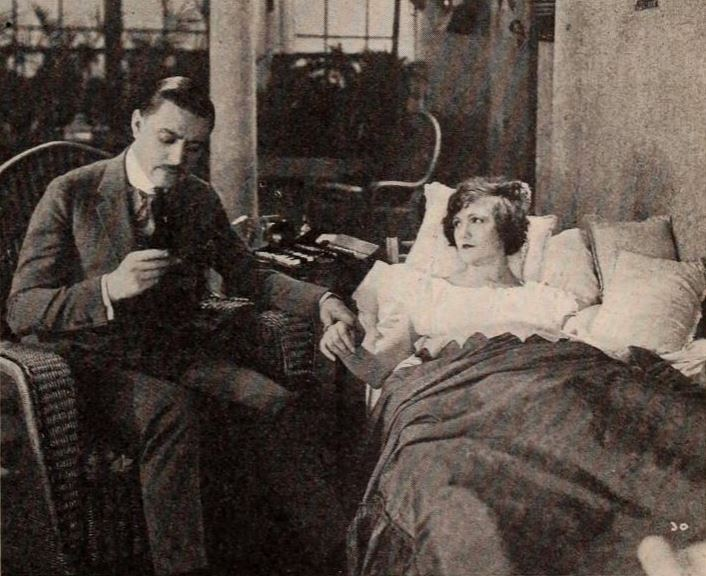

Mama's Affair is a 1921 American silent romantic comedy film directed by Victor Fleming and based on the play of the same title by Rachel Barton Butler. Cast members Effie Shannon, George Le Guere and Katharine Kaelred reprise their roles from the Broadway play.

== Plot ==
As summarized in a film publication, a prologue, which explains where the author got her idea for the story, shows Adam and Eve in the Garden of Eden. When the serpent tells Eve to bite the apple, Adam takes it away from her. The serpent then tells her to go into hysterics and Adam will give her the apple.

Shifting to the modern story, Mrs. Orrin, Eve's mother, goes into hysterics at the thought of losing her daughter. Mrs. Orrin and Mrs. Merchant, who lives with them, have decided that Eve will marry Mrs. Merchant's son Henry, an effeminate youngster with rimmed glasses. Fearing her mother's nerves, Eve is willing to marry Henry, so the four of them go to Mama Orrin's birthplace, where the wedding is scheduled to take place on her birthday. During the stay at the hotel Mama has one of her "attacks" and Dr. Harmon is called in. He soon discovers the exact trouble and orders Mrs. Orrin to bed with instructions that she not even see her daughter. Mrs. Orrin disobeys these orders and then Eve's nerves give way, causing a second visit by the doctor. He takes Eve away from the mother, but after Henry accuses the doctor of being a fortune seeker, the doctor refuses to have anything to do with Eve. Finally, Eve's eyes are opened and she uses a "treat 'em rough" theory on her mother. Besides winning the love of her doctor, she cures her mother of her hysterics.

== Cast ==
- Constance Talmadge as Eve Orrin
- Effie Shannon as Mrs. Orrin
- Kenneth Harlan as Dr. Harmon
- George Le Guere as Henry Marchant
- Katharine Kaelred as Mrs. Marchant
- Gertrude Le Brandt as Bundy

== Psychoanalytic elements ==
Plot elements involving Eve's genuine fit of hysteria before the planned wedding, the doctor's simple cure of removing Eve from her mother, and Eve's subsequent immediate recovery and ability to live an independent life were consistent with then-current popular understandings of Sigmund Freud's theories of repression and the causation of neurosis. The film, however, never directly discusses these notions or uses any psychoanalytic terms in its intertitles.

== Preservation ==
A print of Mama's Affair is maintained in the Library of Congress.
