= Enlighten Thy Daughter (1917 film) =

1917 film by Ivan Abramson

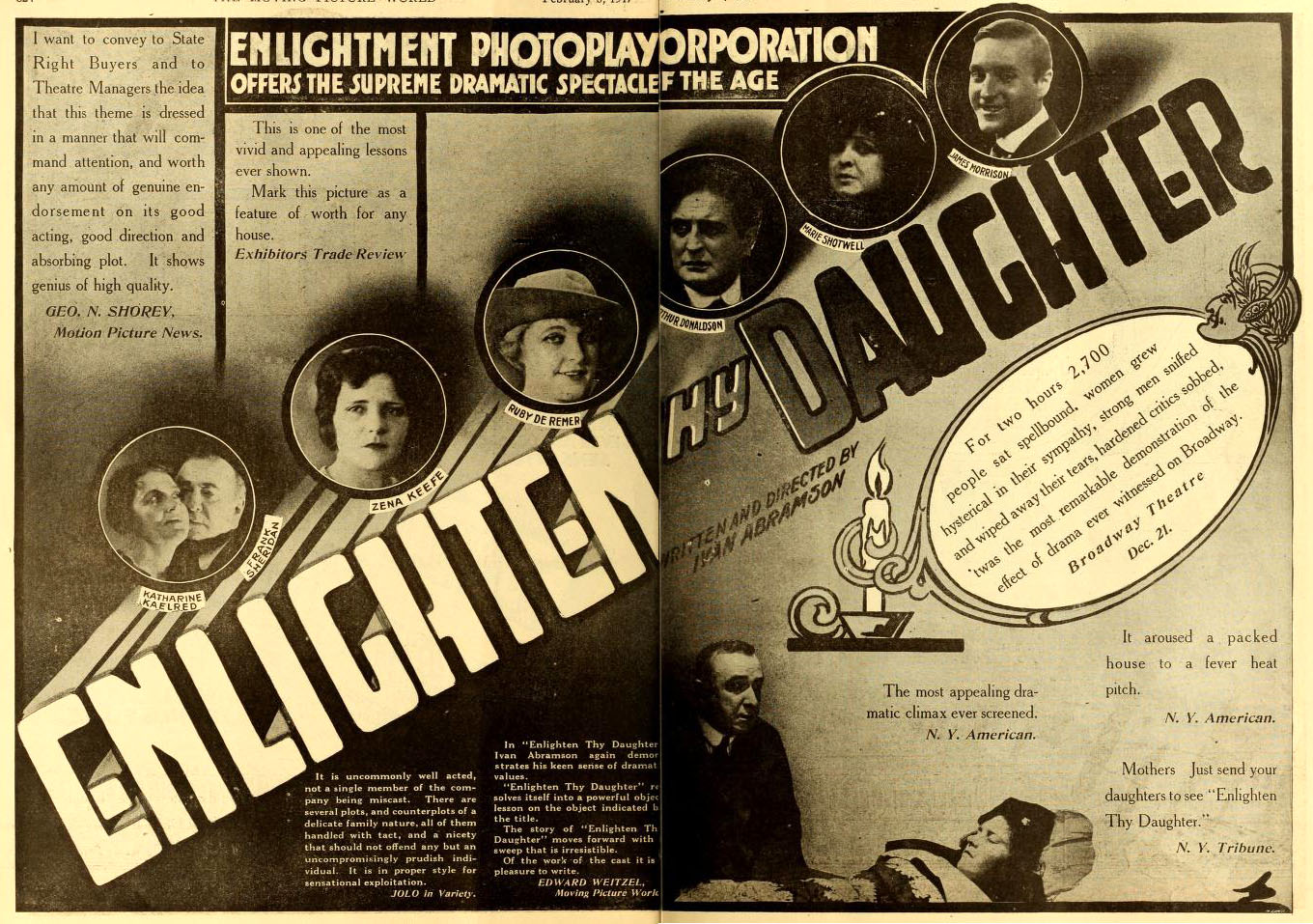
- Advertisement
- Directed by: Ivan Abramson
- Written by: Ivan Abramson
- Produced by: Enlightenment Photoplay Corporation
- Starring: Frank Sheridan, Katharine Kaelred, Zena Keefe
- Distributed by: Ivan Film Productions
- Release date: January 28, 1917
- Running time: 7 reels
- Country: United States
- Language: Silent (English intertitles)

Enlighten Thy Daughter is a 1917 American silent drama film directed and written by Ivan Abramson.

== Plot ==
The exploitation/sexual hygiene film warns against the dangers of premarital sex. Lillian Stevens is young woman who ends up having sex with Harold Winthrop after both are caught in an unexpected storm during a date. Afterwards, she gets pregnant. Her mom does not realize Lillian has been out all night due to her own gambling addiction. The same young man later starts dating Lillian's cousin Ruth. They get engaged, but Lillian's pregnancy—and the identity of the father—is revealed when she dies from an illegal abortion, and Ruth breaks off the engagement.

== Cast ==
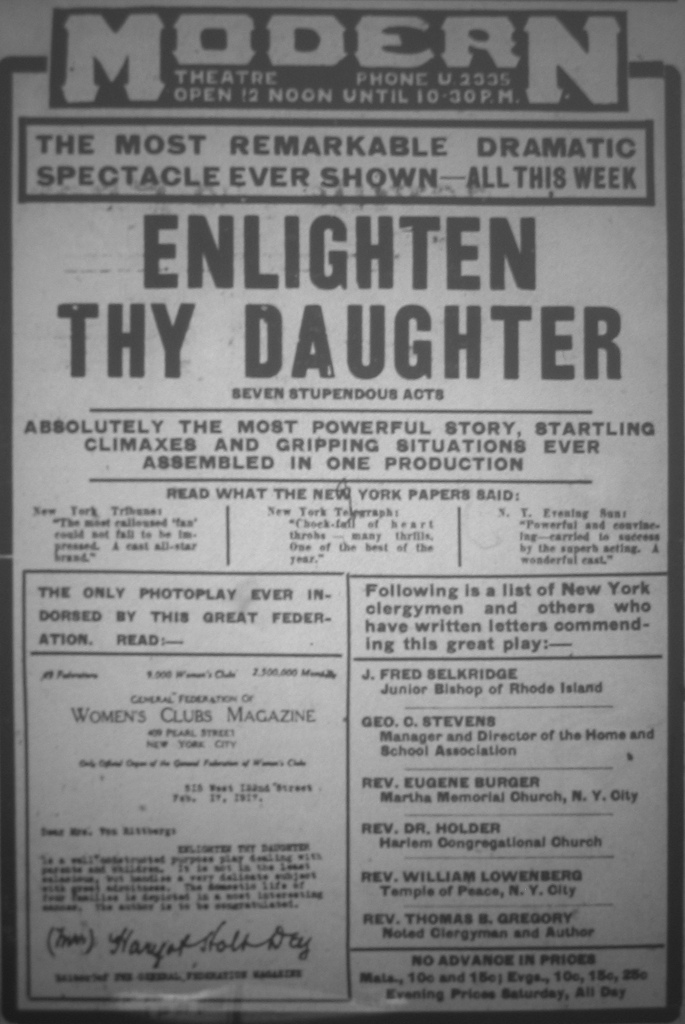
1917 advertisement for Enlighten Thy Daughter, including endorsements from religious leaders

- Frank Sheridan as Daniel Stevens
- Katharine Kaelred as Mrs. Daniel Stevens
- Zena Keefe as Lillian Stevens
- Arthur Donaldson as Richard Stevens
- Marie Shotwell as Minna Stevens
- Rubye De Remer as Ruth Stevens (credited as Ruby De Remer)
- James W. Morrison as Harold Winthrop
- Violet Horner as Mrs. Laurence
- Runa Hodges as Nina
- Walter Gould as Walter
- Mathilde Brundage as Mrs. Winthrop

== Reception ==
The New York Times was critical of the film, calling it an "inept and melodramatic variant of the theme of the danger that lurks in the failure to apprise the young of dangers by which they are beset." Other reviews were not as unkind, however, calling it a "remarkable drama, tense and thrilling," and agreeing with the movie's advertising claim to be "the most tremendous moral force the screen has ever known."

The movie was a box office success, and has been described as director Abramson's biggest hit.

A remake of the same title was released in 1934 (the only Abramson film ever remade).

== Censorship ==
Before Enlighten Thy Daughter could be exhibited in Kansas, the Kansas State Board of Review required the elimination of all scenes where women are smoking, all drinking scenes, the dream of the surveyor's wife, and the shortening of a banquet to two views.
