= She Would Be a Business Man =

- Production company: Centaur Film Company
- Release date: 1910
- Running time: 560 feet
- Country: United States

She Would Be a Business Man is a 1910 American silent comedy film released by Centaur Film Company.

== Plot ==
After watching her husband fail in business, Mrs. Manly claims that she could do his job better than he can. The couple agree to trade clothing and places. But the wife is unable to conduct business because the men around her can't stop getting distracted and asking her out to lunch. Her husband fares similarly poorly at running their household. In the end, the couple agree to "return to their own spheres."
