= Runa Hodges =

American actress

Runa Hodges was a child actor during the silent film era in the U.S. She toured and appeared in person at some of the theater showings of her film series with Reliance.

Hodges was born around 1907 or 1908. According to a newspaper article in The Missoulian, she was first discovered when a film company was looking for someone to play a part as Cupid, and her photograph was passed along to the company.

Along with working in film productions, Hodges attended the Professional Children's School in New York City. She starred in multiple 1913 films for Reliance, including The Little Enchantress, Child Labor, Runa and the Black Hand, Faithful Shep, and The Dream Home.

Hodges appeared in the 1915 film, A Fool There Was, as the child of "The Fool". She acted the part of Stella, the daughter of Count Fabio, in the 1915 film The Unfaithful Wife. The film was based on Marie Corelli's book, Vendetta!. She starred in a five-reel film The Colonel's Oath, produced by Reliance.

She acted alongside fellow child actor Jack Curtis in the 1916 film The House of Mirrors. In 1916 she appeared in the theatrical production Margaret Schiller. In 1916, she worked with the Rialto Film Corporation for a role in their first film release.

She starred as Virgie in the 1918 production of The Littlest Rebel, which opened at the Empire Theater in Paterson, New Jersey.

IMDb lists numerous films she was in, many of them shorts. She never became a star following her childhood celebrity.

== Filmography ==
- The Little Enchantress (1913)
- Child Labor (1913)
- Runa and the Black Hand (1913)
- Faithful Shep (1913)
- The Dream Home (1913)
- A Fool There Was
- Should a Mother Tell? (1915)
- The Unfaithful Wife (1915)
- The Colonel's Oath (c. 1915)
- The House of Mirrors (1916)
- Enlighten Thy Daughter (1917)
