= Alma Webster Hall Powell =

American operatic soprano, suffragist, and inventor

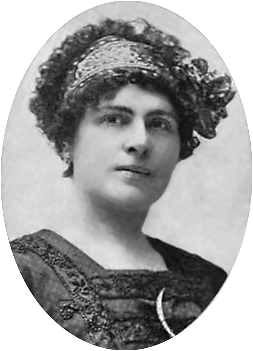
- Born: Alma Webster Hall; November 20, c. 1869; Elgin, Illinois, United States
- Died: March 11, 1930; Mahwah, New Jersey, United States
- Resting place: Green-Wood Cemetery, Brooklyn, New York
- Education: New York University, LL.B. (1900); Columbia University, Mus. Bac. and M.A. (1910); Columbia University, Ph.D. (1913)
- Occupations: Opera singer (soprano), suffragist, writer, lecturer
- Political party: Socialist Party of America
- Spouse: Adoniram Judson Powell (married 1891)
- Children: 1

Alma Webster Hall Powell (November 20, c. 1869 – March 11, 1930), also known as Alma Webster Powell or Alma Webster-Powell, was an American operatic soprano, suffragist, philanthropist, writer, film scenarist, inventor, and member of the Socialist Party.

Powell toured America and Europe as a primadonna soprano, using her breaks from her singing career to carry out philanthropic work and activism, as well as to pursue higher education in a variety of fields, including law, music, and political science. She was the first person to earn a doctorate from the political science department of Columbia University for a treatise on music. She also wrote photoplays about suffrage, patented multiple inventions related to women's fashion, advocated for fashion reform, and lectured on music therapy at universities and colleges around America. She had a three octave vocal range.

== Personal life ==
Alma Webster Hall was born to William Henry Hall and Alma (Webster) Hall, on November 20, c.1869, in Elgin, Illinois.

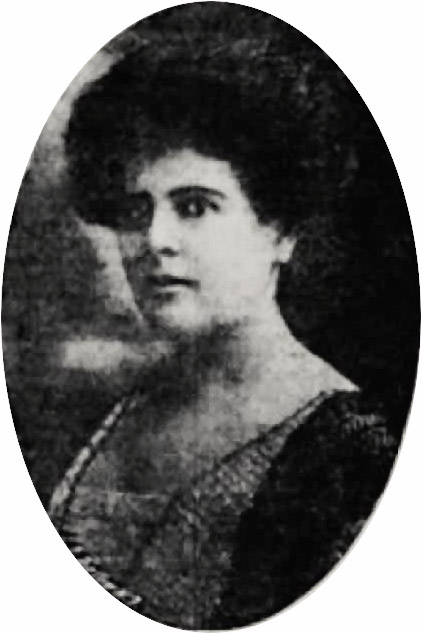
Alma Webster Hall Powell

Hall met future husband Adoniram Judson Powell in New York City. She was singing contralto at a "leading church"; Judson, the organist and a piano manufacturer, recognized her talent and began working with her to develop it. On April 16, 1890, they married in Brooklyn. He had one son, Everett J. Powell, from a previous marriage. In 1892, Alma Webster Powell gave birth to a daughter, named Marian Webster Powell.

The Powells lived in an "elegant brownstone" on President Street in Park Slope, Brooklyn, where Alma Webster Powell was known for converting the roof into a "star parlor" with a "bewildering array of rugs, hammocks, cushions and easy chairs," according to a 1908 article in the New York Times.

In 1922, Variety reported that Powell sued for $75,000 in damages and was awarded $13,000 from the New York Central Railroad, for injuries received in a train wreck on July 2, 1920. Her husband likewise sued for $20,000 in damages for injuries in the same wreck, and was awarded $2,000.

== Operatic career ==
After working with her husband to develop her voice, Alma Webster Powell traveled to Europe in 1894 to further her studies. She made her operatic debut at the Grand Opera of Frankfort-on-Main, as Queen of the Night in Mozart's The Magic Flute, on May 16, 1895. She remained abroad two more years and in 1897 was engaged by the Damrosch-Ellis Opera Company. She made her American debut in Philadelphia, PA, that year. The next year, she became a member of the Savage Opera Co. and made a success in Martha.

According to The National Cyclopædia of American Biography, after her 1900 graduation from New York University, Powell reentered the operatic field, singing at the Stadt Theatre, Breslau, Germany, in The Huguenots, Martha, The Barber of Seville, Lakmé, Faust, Don Giovanni, La Traviata, Lucia di Lammermoore, and repeating her former successes at the Royal Opera House in Berlin. She also sang at the royal opera houses of Munich, Dresden, Prague, and Vienna. In Prague, April 6, 1902, she created the role of Renata in Eugenio di Pirani's opera Das Hexenlied. On November 7, 1902, Powell performed as a soloist accompanied by Eugenio di Pirani at Carnegie Hall. Powell and Pirani then toured throughout Russia, France, Germany, Italy, Austria, Hungary, and England, before returning to the United States. Pirani credited Powell with lifting him out of an artistic rut at this time in his career.

Powell joined the company of the Metropolitan Opera around 1904. In 1906, in conjunction with her husband, she opened the Powell Musical Institute in Brooklyn, teaching voice culture, piano playing, harmony, composition, and languages.

Moving Picture News reported that Powell would perform a concert tour of Europe in August 1911 and sing a grand opera in Berlin.

== Education ==
In her early life, Powell was educated by private tutors and at the Girl's high school in Chicago.

While on an enforced rest from her singing career, Powell used her free time to earn a law degree from New York University in 1900. She later earned a bachelor of music and a master of arts from Columbia University. Powell returned to Columbia to earn a Ph.D. in political science, graduating in 1913. Her dissertation, Music as a Human Need: A Plea for Free National Instruction in Music, marked the first time that the department had awarded a Ph.D. for a treatise on music.

== Writing ==
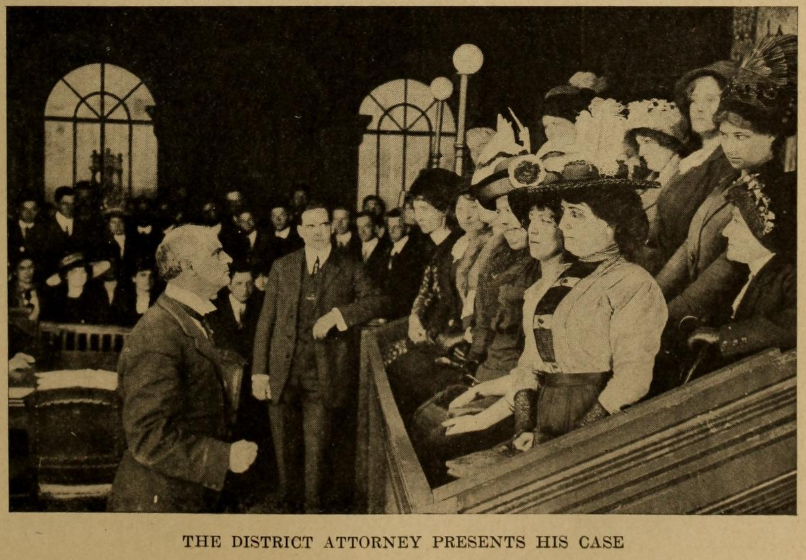
The district attorney presents his case to the first woman jury in America (The Motion Picture Story Magazine, March 1912)

Powell authored a textbook for singers and students, titled Advanced School of Vocal Art (1901). She also wrote the libretto of Black Blood, set to music by Eugenio di Pirani, translated numerous plays and songs, and wrote for magazines and journals.

=== Photoplays ===
In May 1911, Motion Picture Story Magazine announced that their June issue would contain "a clever photoplay by one of America's best-known women, Alma Webster Powell, LL.B, B.M., M.A., entitled 'The Candidates', in which Women Suffrage and the labor problem are handled skillfully and sympathetically." The photoplay appeared in the June issue as promised under the title "The Rival Candidates," accompanied by photo illustrations.

Motion Picture Story Magazine published another photoplay by Powell in March 1912, titled "The First Woman Jury in America." This photoplay was made into a silent film by Vitagraph, released on March 11, 1912, starring Flora Finch.

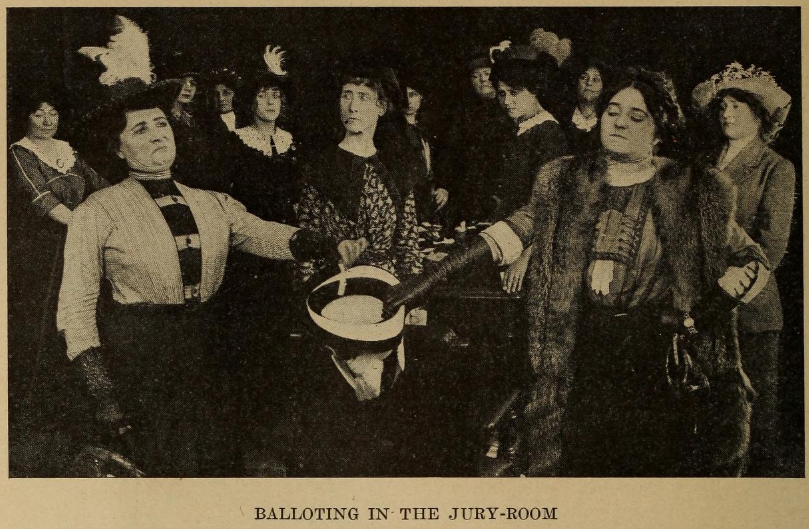
Balloting in the jury room (The Motion Picture Story Magazine, March 1912)

Powell advocated for the use of moving pictures as educational materials in schools, believing that "it is the only way to teach children, for what a child sees in a picture it remembers." She felt that moving pictures would be a good medium for reproducing "grand opera stories" and "the great dramas," as long as care was taken to accurately adapt them to film.

== Philanthropy, activism, and suffrage work ==
Powell was the president and founder of the Public Good Society, which supported the Working Girls' Club and a summer home for tired working girls. She successfully raised large sums for aid of the poor by her voice, and gave free instruction to working girls in music, languages and general science. She was also a member of the Daughters of the American Revolution, a lineage-based service organization. She strongly favored woman suffrage. She was founder of the American Legislative Union, president of the Debating Society (which discussed suffrage once a month), and lectured for suffrage at street comers. Powell was also a member of the Socialist Party.

Powell was a life member of the Women's Press Club, chairing the music committee. However, according to the Carroll Herald, the club asked for Powell's resignation in March 1911. It was reported that club members were upset that Powell "too freely discussed the mental capacity of sister members." They also objected to her visible "trouserettes" and "having her hair cut short in man fashion."

According to Margaret I. MacDonald, Powell raised $60,000 in 1910 "for the betterment of the poor of the East Side" of New York City.

=== Dress reform ===
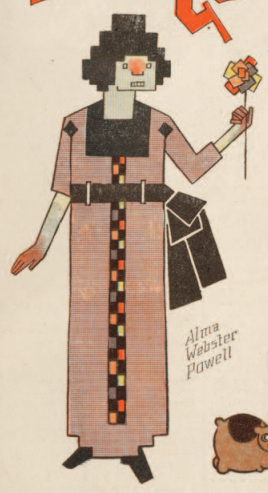
Powell in "Cubist fashion," detail of a 1913 illustration by Harvey Peake.

Powell was an active advocate of women's dress reform, urging the adoption of a standard style, in order to abolish the outside appearance of class distinctions; the costume she advocated was a coat dress over bloomers, which she wore on all occasions. Powell also raised objections to the skirt, and was reported to have devised a "divided skirt" to provide women ease of movement.

Powell patented several innovations related to ladies' garments, including a method by which raincoats or other outerwear could be detached at the shoulders and fastened on an underskirt as a form of drapery.

In a spread mocking "Cubist fashion" published in the Chicago Daily Tribune on April 6, 1913, Powell was illustrated alongside suffragists Carrie Chapman Catt and Rosalie Jones, opera singers Geraldine Farrar and Mary Garden, actresses Billie Burke, Alla Nazimova, and Sarah Bernhardt, novelist Edith Wharton, and dancer Gaby Deslys. According to Elizabeth Carlson, the "individuality and sexual freedom expressed in the bold new cubist fashions led the press to simultaneously link the new style to radical suffragists and young, fashionable celebrities ... Published in the Chicago Tribune while the cubist canvases [of the Armory Show] were on display at the Art Institute, well-known suffragists and celebrities were shown together wearing the recognizable colorful, geometric, and angular gowns."

The newspaper spread's text described each woman's "costume" in the voice of a fashion show report. The description of Powell emphasized her advocacy for dress reform: "The artist seems to have caught that wistful desire for artlessness and sincerity which Mrs. Powell thinks should be the foundation of every woman's clothes."

=== Music therapy ===
Powell was an early advocate for music therapy. Building on her Ph.D. work, Powell undertook a lecture tour of the United States around 1919. Her talks promoted music not just as a human need, as she had written in her dissertation, but as a health need. Her lectures were divided into two parts: first, she spoke on the benefits of music for children's health, household management, the nervous system, and stamina; then, Powell demonstrated her musical theories with a recital.

== Death ==
Alma Webster Hall Powell died from heart disease on March 11, 1930, in Mahwah, NJ. She is buried in Green-Wood Cemetery in Brooklyn, next to her husband. The New York Times published an obituary about her life and achievements on Friday, March 14, 1930.
