= Norma Phillips =

American film and theater actress

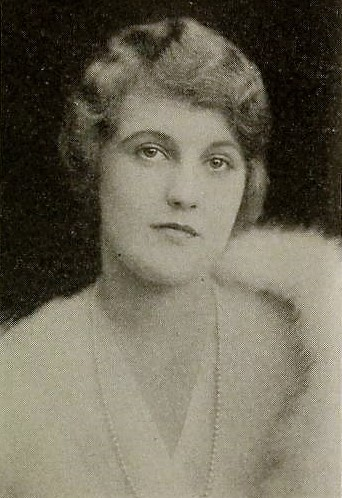
- Phillips c. 1914
- Born: 1893
- Died: November 13, 1931 (aged 38); Brooklyn, New York, U.S.
- Occupation: Actress
- Years active: 1911–1931
- Known for: Our Mutual Girl
- Spouse: Robert Gleckler (m. 1920; div. 1929)

Norma Phillips (1893 – November 13, 1931) was an American film and theater actress in the 1910s and 1920s. Starting as a theater performer, she was a member of a high profile chorus line and performed in England in addition to the United States from 1911 through 1913. After being scouted by film studios, she starred in several films with the Reliance Company before becoming the star for the 52 episode film serial Our Mutual Girl that established her career in film. Taking a break from film in 1915 for two years, she returned for several more appearances before leaving for a career in Broadway theater and forming her own stock company.

== Career ==
Born to a Southern family and raised in Baltimore, she attended Mount Saint Agnes College in her early years. Phillips started her performing background as a musical comedy artist in theater productions. For her New York stage appearances, she was a member of a chorus line including Jeanne Eagels, Helen Broderick, and Ina Claire. Traveling abroad, she was a part of the opening of the West End theatre performance of Come Over Here in 1912. After, she returned to the United States and appeared in an actress star search conducted by Mutual Film, which led to her being chosen by the president of the company as their new star. She was then told to join the Reliance Company and starred in the crime short film Below the Deadline. She also played the main role in The Clown's Daughter, where the actors spent several days at Sig Sautelle's Circus practicing for their roles and Phillips trying circus horseback riding.

The following year, she gained popularity for appearing in weekly film serials, becoming particularly known as the "Mutual Girl" from the 52 episode serial Our Mutual Girl. The episodes featured Phillips having tea with a different celebrity every week, following the storyline of a young small city girl moving to a big city and becoming involved in high fashion and social life. Her episode entertaining then star Broadway comedian Douglas Fairbanks resulted in his popularity massively increasing afterwards. This would lead to the creation of Triangle Pictures, which signed Fairbanks on to his first film debut in The Lamb. During the production of Our Mutual Girl, Phillips lived with her mother in New York City, who also accompanied her on her theater and film trips.

After the production of Runaway June in 1915, Phillips took two years off from films and returned in 1917 with a new contract for five films produced by the World Film Company. She later left the film industry permanently, spending several years in theater stock performances, including creating her own Phillips stock company that became one of the most known in the United States, before obtaining roles on Broadway and traveling theater productions. Her last appearance was in Five Star Final in Boston.

== Personal life ==
Phillips was married to actor Robert Gleckler in 1920, but divorced in 1929. She died at Lutheran Hospital in Brooklyn on November 13, 1931, at the age of 38. She had been seriously ill for several weeks, following a much longer period of failing health.

== Filmography ==
- Ashes (1913)
- The Higher Justice (1913)
- The Girl Spy's Atonement (1913) as the girl spy
- The Clown's Daughter (1913) as Madge
- The Glow Worm (1913) as Electra
- Below the Deadline (1913)
- Our Mutual Girl (1914)
- Runaway June (1915) as June
- Red Light Annie (1924) as Annie

== Theater ==
- Jumping Jupiter (1911)
- John W. Blake (1916)
- Parents (1928)
