= Margaret Vale =

American actress

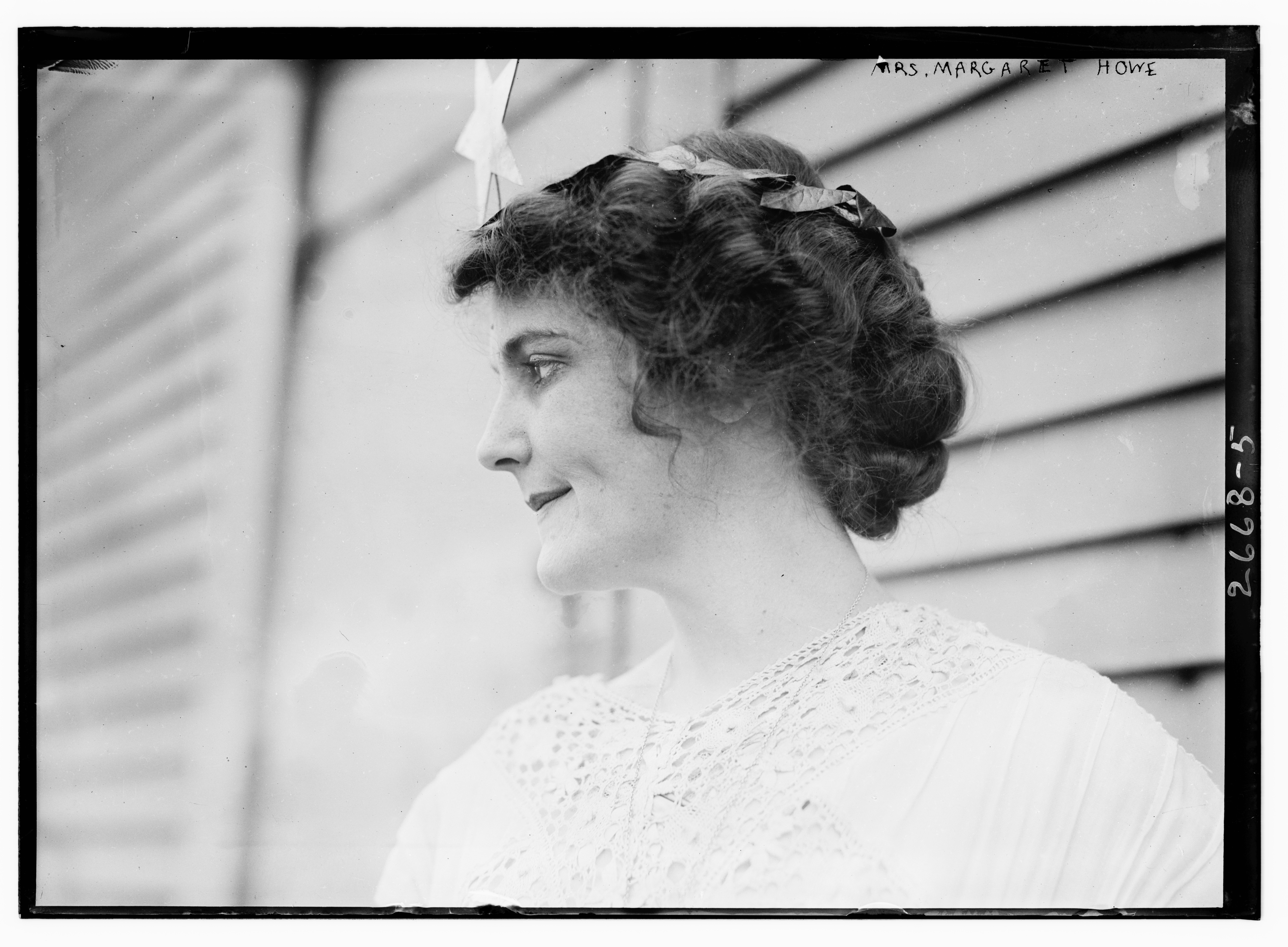
- Margaret Vale in 1913.
- Born: Margaret Smyth Flinn; March 30, 1878; Charleston, South Carolina, US
- Died: November 29, 1947 (aged 69)
- Occupation: Actress

Margaret Vale (born Margaret Smyth Flinn, later Margaret Howe; March 30, 1878 in Charleston, South Carolina – November 29, 1947) was a film and theatre actress and a feminist.

== Career ==
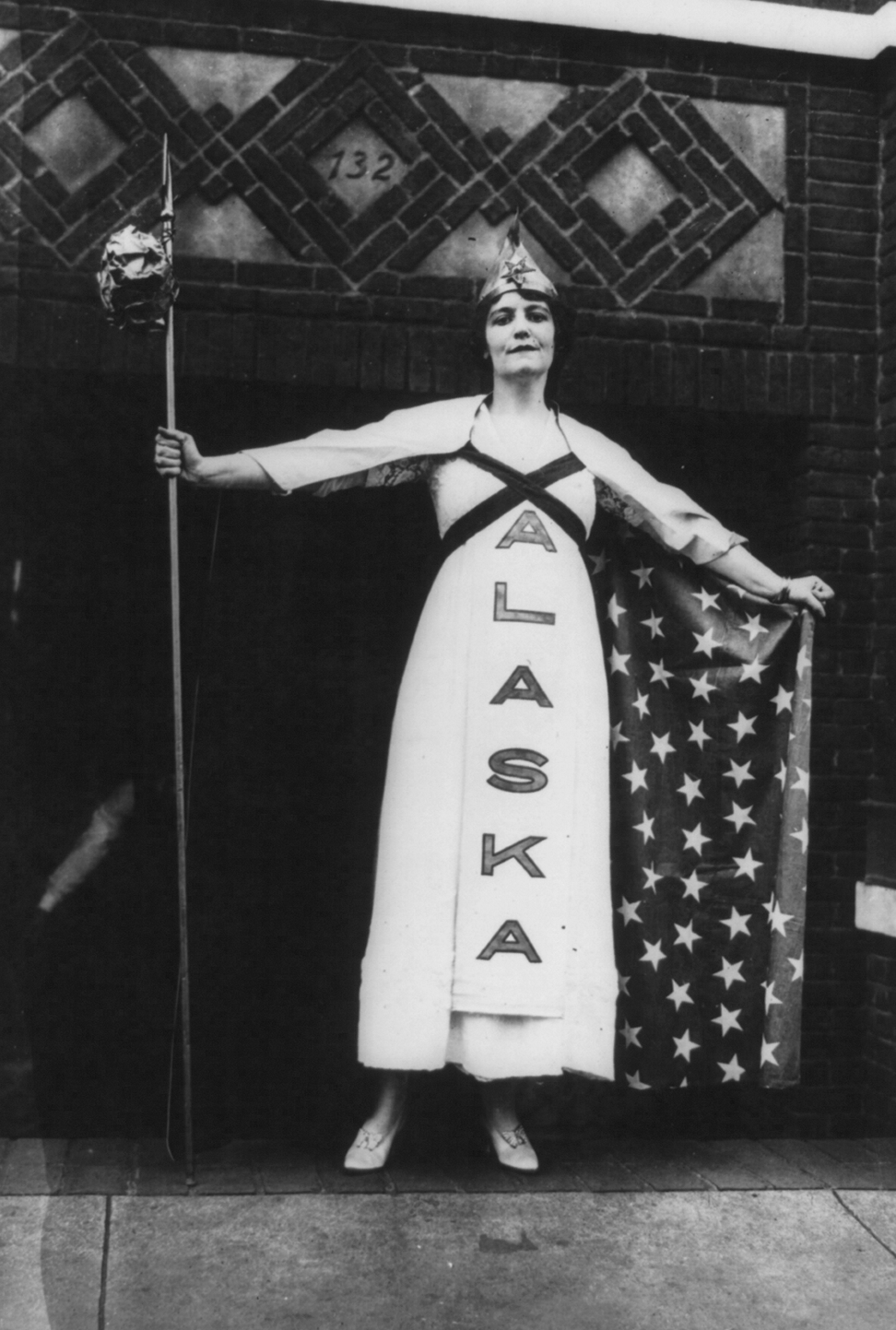
Press photo of Margaret Vale (Mrs. George Howe), niece of Pres. Wilson, in Suffrage parade, New York. Oct. 1915; here she represents Alaska, which granted women's suffrage in 1913.

=== Filmography ===
She appeared in two silent films.

Year	Film	Role	Genre
1915	Was He a Coward?	Lois Jordan	drama
1915	A Gilded Fool (also known as The Gilded Fool)	undetermined role	comedy-drama

=== Stage work ===
Vale appeared in one Broadway-theatre production, the comedy play Omar, the Tentmaker (1914), in New York City, New York.

== Personal life ==
She was married to George Howe.
