= Big Stakes =

Big Stakes may refer to:

- Big Stakes (1920 film), an American western short film directed by Jacques Jaccard
- Big Stakes (1922 film), an American western film directed by Clifford S. Elfelt
