= Danger Ahead =

Danger Ahead may refer to:

- Danger Ahead (1918 film), short starring Helen Gibson
- Danger Ahead (1921 film), starring Mary Philbin
- Danger Ahead (1923 film), written by Keene Thompson
- Danger Ahead (1935 film), American film directed by Albert Herman
- Danger Ahead (1940 film), starring Dorothea Kent
- "Danger Ahead", the four-note leitmotif to Dragnet, derived from Miklós Rózsa's score for The Killers
- "Danger Ahead", a track on the 1983 Electric Light Orchestra album Secret Messages
- Danger Ahead, a volume consisting of the novels Red Lights and The Watchmaker of Everton by Georges Simenon
