= Marie Shotwell =

American actress (1880–1934)

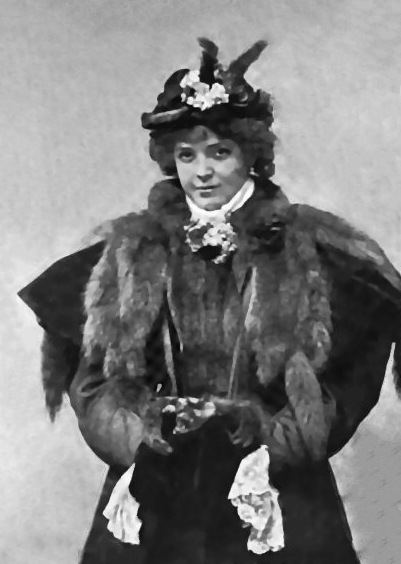
- Marie Shotwell (National Magazine, 1897)
- Born: March 21, 1880
- Died: September 18, 1934 (aged 54)
- Spouse: William G. Austin (div. 1916)

Marie Shotwell (March 21, 1880 – September 18, 1934) was an American actress of the stage and screen.

== Biography ==
Shotwell was in motion pictures beginning in 1915 with roles in God's Witness, The Taming of Mary, Under Southern Skies, and The Tale of the C. Her film career continued until the late 1920s, including Sally of the Sawdust (1925) with W.C. Fields; her final appearances were in Running Wild (1927) and One Woman To Another (1927).

She was married to a former Savannah, Georgia, police chief, William G. Austin. Shotwell divorced Austin in 1916.

In 1922 Shotwell became executrix for the estate of her friend, New York City public school teacher Marie J. Pearson. Shotwell was sued by an undertaker for $245, the amount of the burial bill.

The actress died of a cerebral hemorrhage in 1934 after she was stricken while she was working in the Astoria, New York Film Studios. Shotwell was working on the George M. Cohan movie Gambling. She was fifty-four years old.

== Partial filmography ==
Year	Title	Role	Notes
1915	Under Southern Skies	Mrs. Hampton	
1917	Enlighten Thy Daughter	Minna Stevens	
1917	Married in Name Only	Mrs. Worthing	
1918	Miss Innocence	Fay Gonard	
1919	The Echo of Youth	Ruth Carlyle Graham	
1920	The Evil Eye	Mrs. David Bruce	
1920	Civilian Clothes	Mrs. Smythe	
1920	The Master Mind	Sadie	
1920	Blackbirds	Edna Crocker	
1921	Her Lord and Master	Mrs. Stillwater	
1922	Shackles of Gold	Mrs. Van Dusen	
1923	Does It Pay?	Mrs. Clark	
1925	The Manicure Girl	Mrs. Wainwright	
1925	Sally of the Sawdust	Society Leader	
1925	Shore Leave	Mrs. Schuyler-Payne	
1925	Lovers in Quarantine	Mrs. Borroughs	
1927	Running Wild	Mrs. Finch	
1927	One Woman to Another	Mrs. Gray	
