= Muriel Hine =

British novelist

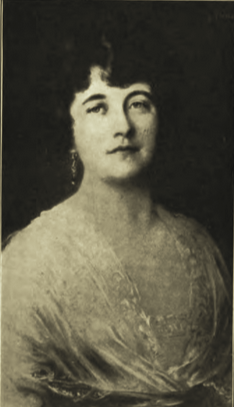
- Born: 18 January 1874; Nottinghamshire, England, UK
- Died: 16 June 1949 (aged 75); Chelsea, London, England
- Occupation: Novelist
- Writing career
- Pen name: Mrs Sidney Coxon, Muriel Hine Coxon, Nicholas Bevel

Muriel Hine (18 January 1874 – 16 June 1949) was a prolific British novelist under her own name and as Mrs Sidney Coxon (from the name of her husband). She published 35 volumes of romantic fiction between 1910 and 1950.

== Biography ==
Born Muriel Florence Hine in Nottinghamshire, England at the beginning of 1874 to George Thomas Hine the architect, and Florence Deane nee Cooper. Muriel married in 1903 to Sidney Coxon. She died in Chelsea in June 1949.

== Literary work ==
She was a romantic novelist who wrote both under her own name and as Mrs Sidney Coxon after she married in July 1903. She also wrote as Nicholas Bevel. At least one of her novels was turned into a film, the silent film Fifth Avenue Models in 1925 starring Mary Philbin, Norman Kerry and Josef Swickard. Her novels included the fantasy genre and at least one with a feminist theme. Her books were translated into at least Swedish (translated by A. Björklund) and Finnish. Hine also published short stories in magazines.

== Bibliography ==
- Half in Earnest, 1910
- April Panhasard, 1913
- The man with the Double Heart, 1914
- The best in life, 1918
- The Hidden Valley, 1919
- Autumn, 1921
- The flight, 1923
- Youth wins, 1924
- The breathless moment, 1925
- Torquil's success, 1925
- Autumn, 1927
- Earth, 1928
- The Ladder of Folly, 1928
- The reluctant impostor, 1928
- The individual, 1928
- The seven lovers, and other stories, 1928
- The Hurcotts, 1929
- Pilgrim's Ford, 1930
- Ten days' wonder, 1931
- Wild rye, 1932
- Jenny Rorke, 1933
- The Door Opens, 1935
- The spell of Siris, 1935
- A man's way, 1935
- A different woman, 1936
- Clear as the sun, 1938
- Family circle, 1939
- Man of the House, 1940
- Forbidden love, 1941
- The Prodigal Daughter, 1942
- The Second Wife, 1943
- Marriage by proxy, 1944
- The Island Forbidden to Man, 1946
- Liar's Progress, 1950
