= Edmund Lawrence =

Edmund Lawrence may refer to:

- Edmund Lawrence (basketball) (1952–2015), American basketball player
- Edmund Lawrence (MP), 14th-century English member of Parliament for Lancashire
- Edmund Lawrence (director) of Married in Name Only
- Edmund Wickham Lawrence (1932–2025), Governor-General of Saint Kitts and Nevis
