= The White Pearl (film) =

1915 film

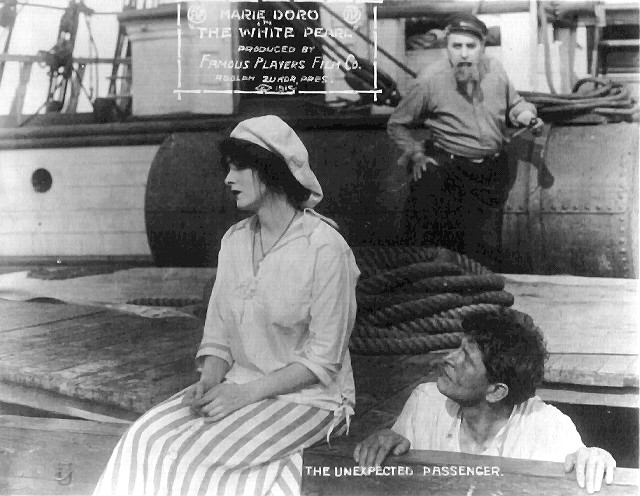
- Lobby card with Marie Doro and Thomas Holding
- Directed by: Edwin S. Porter; Hugh Ford
- Screenplay by: Edith Barnard Delano
- Story by: Edith Barnard Delano
- Starring: Marie Doro
- Production company: Famous Players Film Company
- Distributed by: Paramount Pictures
- Release date: October 11, 1915
- Running time: 5 reels
- Country: United States
- Language: Silent (English intertitles)

The White Pearl is a 1915 American silent adventure/romantic drama film directed by Edwin S. Porter and Hugh Ford. Produced by the Famous Players Film Company, the film starred Marie Doro in her second leading role.

== Cast ==
- Marie Doro as Nancy Marvell
- Thomas Holding as Bob Alden
- Walter Craven as Robert Alden Sr.
- Robert Broderick as Capt. Marvell
- Cesare Gravina as Setsu
- Maud Granger as Setsu's Wife
- Robert Cain as Capt. Featherstone

== Preservation status ==
The White Pearl is now considered lost.
