= Oh, What a Night! (1926 film) =

1926 film

- Directed by: Lloyd Ingraham
- Written by: Colin Clements; Florence Ryerson
- Starring: Raymond McKee; Edna Murphy; Charles K. French
- Cinematography: Herbert Kirkpatrick
- Production company: Sterling Pictures
- Distributed by: Sterling Pictures
- Release date: November 5, 1926
- Running time: 50 minutes
- Country: United States
- Language: Silent (English intertitles)

Oh, What a Night! is a 1926 American silent comedy film directed by Lloyd Ingraham and starring Raymond McKee, Edna Murphy, and Charles K. French.

== Plot ==
As described in a film magazine review, Robert Brady is the struggling author of a play which the producer has rejected because in the last act a baby swallows the pearls, and the producer insists that no child alive could swallow a string of pearls. Back at his quiet hotel room, Robert feels he is going mad after he is repeatedly interrupted in his attempts to rewrite the third act. A baby hollowing in the apartment above him is the first crack, which is followed by a crook opening a safe only to find a bottle of gin. The baby, left alone in the apartment, grabs the pearls before the thief can stop him, and the thief assumes the child swallowed them. To get the pearls, the thief kidnaps the baby. The author becomes implicated and is suspected of having the stolen pearls. After a chase, the culprit is caught, the pearls are found in the baby's rompers, and the author goes back with confidence to complete his writing.

== Cast ==
- Raymond McKee as Robert 'Bob' Brady
- Edna Murphy as June Craig
- Charles K. French as John Craig
- Wilfrid North as Dean Simpson
- Ned Sparks as 'Slickry' Benton
- Frank Alexander as Bill Williams
- Hilliard Karr as Detective
- Jackie Combs as Baby Tommy

== Preservation ==
Prints of Oh, What a Night! are in the film collections of the Museum Of Modern Art, UCLA Film and Television Archive, and BFI National Archive.

== Bibliography ==
- Connelly, Robert B. The Silents: Silent Feature Films, 1910-36, Volume 40, Issue 2. December Press, 1998.
- Munden, Kenneth White. The American Film Institute Catalog of Motion Pictures Produced in the United States, Part 1. University of California Press, 1997.
