= Captain Hurricane =

1935 film by John S. Robertson

- Directed by: John S. Robertson; Charles Kerr (assistant)
- Written by: Josephine Lovett
- Based on: The Taming of Zenas Henry by Sara Ware Bassett
- Starring: Helen Westley; James Barton; Helen Mack; Lon Chaney Jr.
- Music by: Roy Webb
- Production company: RKO Radio Pictures
- Release date: 1935
- Running time: 72 minutes
- Country: United States
- Language: English
- Budget: $208,000
- Box office: $150,000

Captain Hurricane is a 1935 American drama film about the life of fishermen in Cape Cod.

== Plot ==
Sailor Zenas Brewster is notorious for his bad temper, earning him the nickname of "Captain Hurricane". He falls in love with Abbie Howland, but she is turned off by his temperament. After attempting to retire early, Brewster is forced once again to go to sea by a bad business venture. He winds up a hero when he saves his crew from a deadly shipboard fire.

== Cast ==
- James Barton as Capt. Zenas Henry Brewster
- Helen Westley as Abbie Howland
- Helen Mack as Susan 'Matley' Ann
- Lon Chaney Jr. (credited as Creighton Chaney) as Abbie Howland's brother
- Gene Lockhart as Capt. Jeremiah Taylor
- Henry Travers as Capt. Ben
- Douglas Walton as Jimmy Howell
- Otto Hoffman as Silas Coffin

== Box office ==
The film lost $126,000 at the box office.
