= Captured! =

1933 film

- Film poster
- Directed by: Roy Del Ruth
- Written by: Edward Chodorov
- Based on: Fellow Prisoners; 1930 story by Philip Gibbs
- Produced by: Edward Chodorov
- Starring: Leslie Howard; Douglas Fairbanks Jr. Paul Lukas; Margaret Lindsay
- Cinematography: Barney McGill
- Edited by: William Holmes
- Music by: Bernhard Kaun
- Production company: Warner Bros. Pictures
- Distributed by: Warner Bros. Pictures
- Release date: August 19, 1933
- Running time: 72 minutes
- Country: United States
- Language: English
- Budget: $245,000

Captured! (aka Fellow Prisoners) is a 1933 American pre-Code war drama film about World War I prisoners of war in a German camp. (Note: The film's pre-release title was Fellow Prisoners.) The film was directed by Roy Del Ruth and stars Leslie Howard and Douglas Fairbanks Jr. Captured! was based on the short story "Fellow Prisoners" (1930) by Sir Philip Gibbs.

== Plot ==
British Captain Fred Allison bids farewell to his new wife, Monica, whom he has only known for six days, and sets out to serve in World War I. He ends up a prisoner of war (POW), tortured by the fact that his wife has not written to him since the early days of his two-year captivity.

When a fellow inmate shoots a guard, the prisoners make an impromptu unsuccessful dash for freedom, resulting in much bloodshed on both sides. As punishment, they are locked in a crowded cell for about a month. Finally, a new commandant, Oberst Carl Ehrlich, takes charge of the camp. Allison persuades Ehrlich (a fellow Oxford alumnus) to rescind the punishment.

One day, a fresh batch of POWs arrives. Allison is delighted to find his oldest and best friend among them, Royal Flying Corps Lieutenant Jack "Dig" Digby. For some reason though, Dig is not as pleased to see him. However, Allison attributes that to their situation. Dig is determined to escape, regardless of the consequences to his fellow prisoners. He does manage to break free, stealing an aircraft from the nearby airfield.

The Germans find his coat near the dead body of Elsa, a woman who delivered fresh food to the camp. Ehrlich writes to the Allies, demanding Dig's return to stand trial for rape and murder. Allison refuses to cooperate, until he recognizes the handwriting on a letter found in the coat. When he reads it, he discovers that Monica and Dig have been carrying on an affair for the last six months. Allison then adds his signature to Ehrlich's request. On the strength of Allison's endorsement, the British do send Dig back.

Dig refuses to defend himself, insisting only that he knows Allison's motive for bringing him back. He is found guilty and sentenced to death by firing squad. The real perpetrator, Strogin, writes a note confessing to the crime, then hangs himself. Allison finds the note, but instead of notifying the Germans, crumples it up. Just before Dig is to be executed, Allison's conscience makes him show the confession to Ehrlich. Afterward, Allison tells Dig he will give Monica up.

All along, Allison has been planning a mass escape. He seizes the machine gun guarding the front gate, then holds off the guards while his comrades escape. The POWs race to the airfield, overcome the aircrews there, and fly off in a squadron of bombers preparing for their nightly raid. Allison is killed by a grenade. When Ehrlich finds his body, he salutes.

== Cast ==
- Leslie Howard as Captain Fred Allison
- Douglas Fairbanks Jr. as Lieutenant Jack "Dig" Digby
- Paul Lukas as Oberst Carl Ehrlich
- Margaret Lindsay as Monica A. Allison
- Robert Barrat as The Commandant
- Arthur Hohl as Cocky
- John Bleifer as Strogin
- William Le Maire as Joe "Tex" Martin (as William LeMaire)
- J. Carrol Naish as Corporal Guarand (as J. Carroll Naish)
- Philip Faversham as Lieutenant Haversham (as Phillip Faversham)
- Frank Reicher as Herr Hauptman
- Joyce Coad as Elsa
- Bert Sprotte as Sergeant Major
- Harry Cording as First Orderly
- Halliwell Hobbes as British Major General
- Leyland Hodgson as Major Hudson

== Production ==
Captured! was shot largely on the Warner Bros. backlot in Hollywood with a large cast and crew of 1,500. A total of 75 aircraft were assembled, including Keystone LB-5 bombers that portrayed the German World War I Gotha bombers, located at the airfield near the POW camp. The location photography took place at the Grand Central Airport in Burbank, California. Director Roy Del Ruth, in a 29-day shooting schedule, purposely shot scenes at night to give a shadowy, sinister atmosphere.

== Reception ==
Film reviewer Mordaunt Hall in his review for The New York Times wrote that Captured!, "with all its adequate staging, it is a trifle too melodramatic to be credible."
