= Hulda from Holland =

1916 film by John B. O'Brien

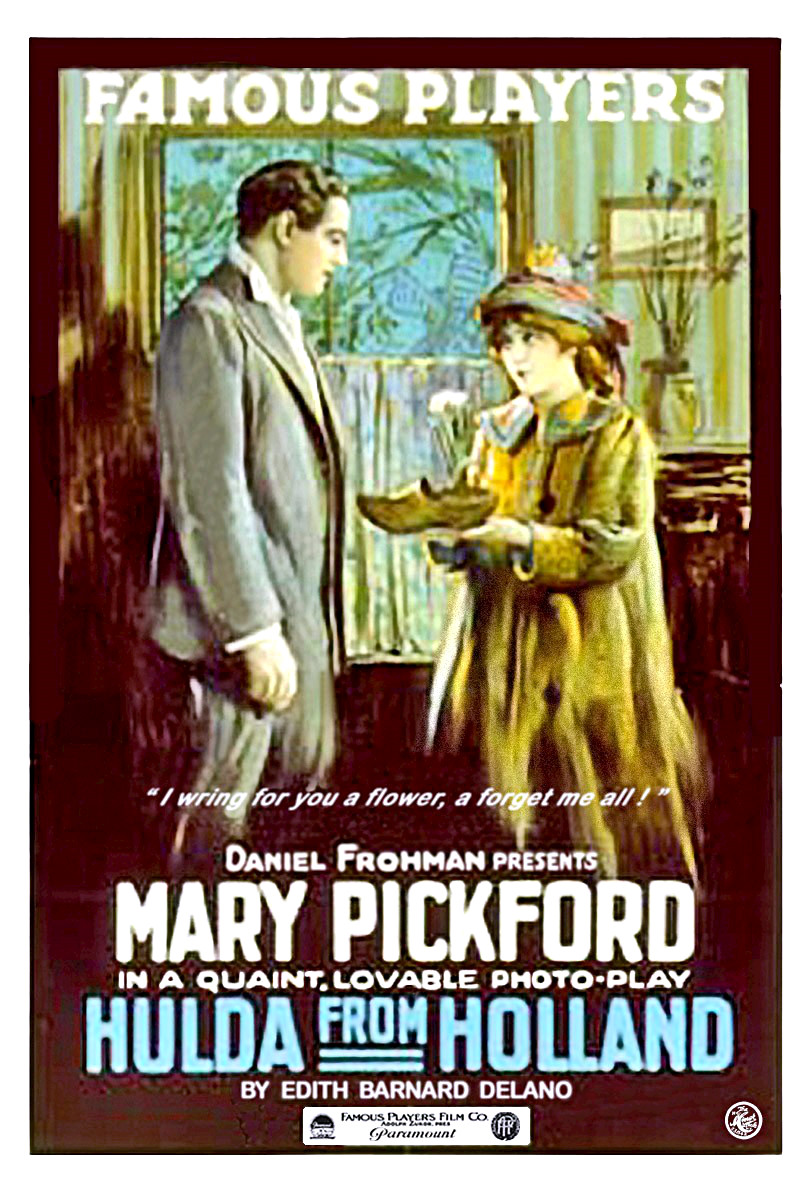
- Film poster
- Directed by: John B. O'Brien
- Written by: Edith Barnard Delano
- Produced by: Adolph Zukor
- Cinematography: Emmett A. Williams
- Distributed by: Paramount Pictures
- Release date: July 30, 1916
- Running time: 5 reels
- Country: United States
- Language: Silent (English intertitles)

Hulda from Holland is a 1916 American silent drama film directed by John B. O'Brien that was produced by Famous Players Film Company and released by Paramount Pictures. It stars Mary Pickford, then the biggest movie star in America. The story is an original for the screen called Miss Jinny.

== Plot ==
Upon the death of her parents, little Hulda find herself sole guardian of her three small brothers. Fortunately, she receives a letter from her wealthy Uncle Peter in Pennsylvania inviting the three orphans to come to America and live with him. Shortly afterwards, Uncle Peter drives to the Port of New York to pick them up, but is injured by an automobile accident and taken to a hospital where he lies unidentified. Uncle Peter's disappearance not only causes distress to the three newly arrived Dutch immigrants, but also to a railroad president, Mr. Walton, who is trying to buy the right-of-way through Uncle Peter's farmland and has only three deals left in which to close the deal. The search for the old man by both Hulda and Mr. Walton's son result in a blossoming romance between the two.

== Cast ==
- Mary Pickford as Hulda
- Frank Losee as John Walton
- John Bowers as Allan Walton
- Russell Bassett as Uncle Peter
- Harold Hollacher as Little Jacob
- Charles E. Vernon as The Burgomaster

unbilled

- Cesare Gravina as Apartment Neighbor

== Preservation status ==
The film survives in two European film archives.
