= Girl Overboard (1929 film) =

1929 American film by Wesley Ruggles

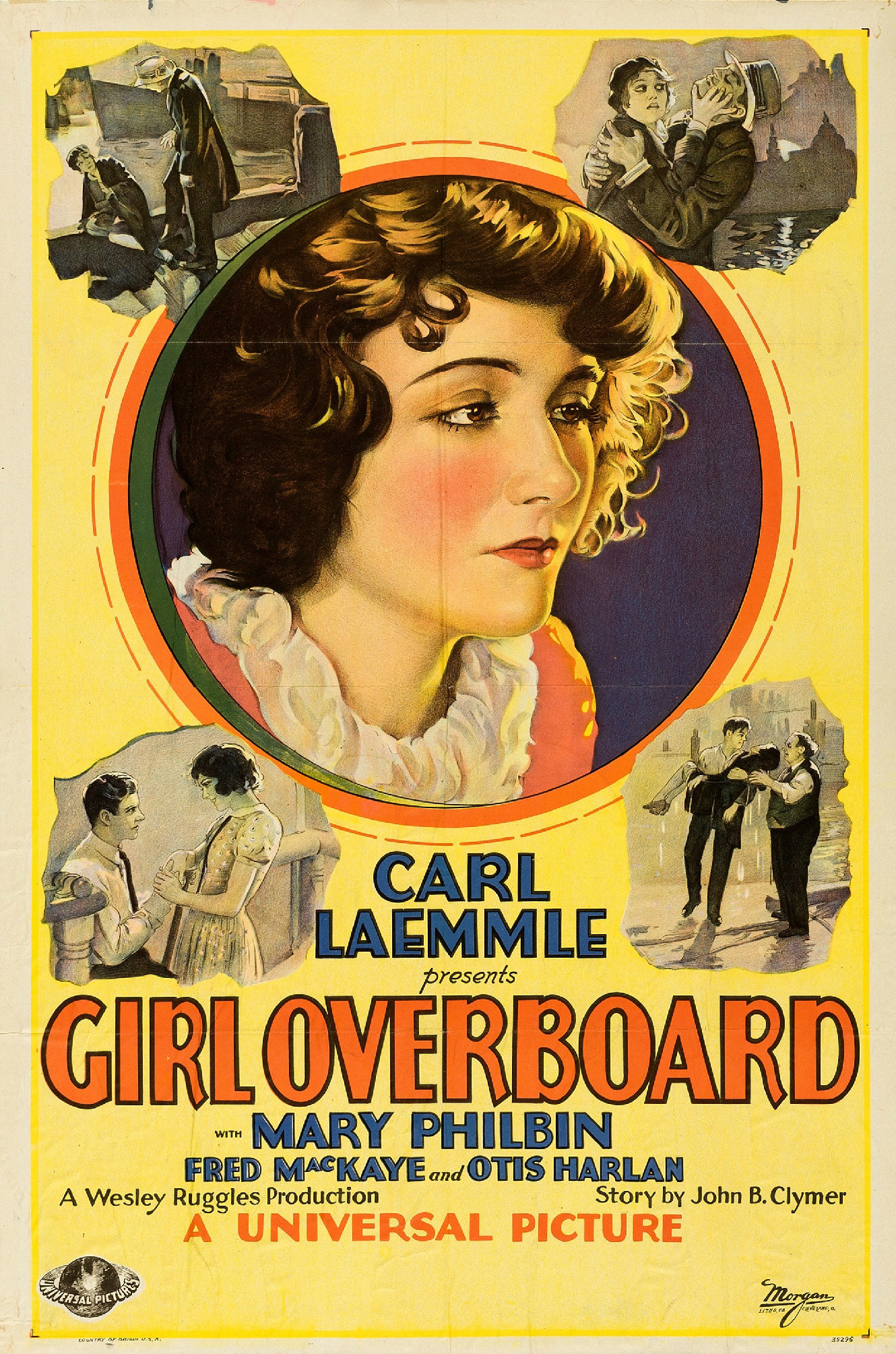
- Film poster
- Directed by: Wesley Ruggles
- Written by: Paul Schofield (scenario); Walter Anthony; Charles H. Smith
- Story by: John B. Clymer
- Produced by: Harry L. Decker
- Starring: Mary Philbin
- Cinematography: John Stumar
- Edited by: Ray Curtiss
- Distributed by: Universal Pictures
- Release date: July 28, 1929
- Running time: 8 reels
- Languages: Sound (Part-Talkie); English intertitles

Girl Overboard is a 1929 American sound part-talkie drama film directed by Wesley Ruggles and starring Mary Philbin. In addition to sequences with audible dialogue or talking sequences, the film features a synchronized musical score and sound effects along with English intertitles. The soundtrack was recorded using the Western Electric sound-on-film system. The film was distributed by Universal Pictures.

The film is also known under the alternative titles of Salvage and Port of Dreams.

== Cast ==
- Mary Philbin as Joan
- Fred Mackaye as Denton Ford Jr.
- Otis Harlan as Joe Evans
- Francis McDonald as Francisco
- Edmund Breese as Jim Keefe
- Wilfrid North as Judge
- Mary Alden

== Preservation ==
With no prints of Girl Overboard located in any film archives, it is a lost film.

== Music ==
The film featured a theme song entitled "Today and Tomorrow" which was composed by Fred E. Ahlert, Joseph Cherniavsky, and Roy Turk.

== See also ==
- List of early sound feature films (1926–1929)
