= Fifth Avenue Models =

1925 film

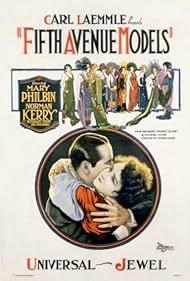
- Directed by: Svend Gade
- Written by: Olga Printzlau
- Based on: The Best in Life by Muriel Hine
- Starring: Mary Philbin; Norman Kerry; Josef Swickard
- Cinematography: John Stumar
- Production company: Universal Pictures
- Distributed by: Universal Pictures
- Release date: April 25, 1925
- Running time: 70 minutes
- Country: United States
- Language: Silent (English intertitles)

Fifth Avenue Models is a 1925 American silent drama film directed by Svend Gade and starring Mary Philbin, Norman Kerry, and Josef Swickard. It was produced and released by Universal Pictures.

== Plot ==
As described in a review in a film magazine, Isobel Ludant (Philbin), the beautiful daughter of a talented but unsuccessful artist, is the breadwinner of the family, working in the shop of fashionable modiste. One night she is forced to act as a mannequin and gains the attention of art dealer Francis Doran (Kerry). As a result of a remark made by one of the other mannequins, Isobel attacks the young woman and is discharged. Before she reaches home, a man from the modeste's shop tells her that her father will be arrested unless she pays $150 for the dress she ruined in the fight. To save his daughter, the father (Ludant) goes with some crooks to identify a painting they want to steal, but he is caught and sent to Sing Sing. From then on, Isobel is placed in many suspicious situations as secretary to Doran, who knows nothing of what happened to the father. Doran loves her, but she believes his attentions mean less than marriage until he stands by her when her father is released from jail and his disgrace is blazoned to the world, at the time Doran's masterpiece is acclaimed by critics.

== Cast ==
- Mary Philbin as Isobel Ludant
- Norman Kerry as Francis Doran
- Josef Swickard as Josef Ludant
- William Conklin as Abel Van Groot
- Rosemary Theby as Mrs. Van Groot
- Rose Dione as Madame Suze
- Robert Brower as Art Salesman
- Betty Francisco as Rosie Guffy
- Helen Lynch as Maid
- George B. Williams as Van der Frift
- Jean Hersholt as Mr. Jones, a Crook
- Robert McKenzie as Mr. Fisk
- Ruth Stonehouse as Mrs. Fisk
- Lee Moran as Mrs. Fisk's Lover
- Mike Donlin as Crook's Henchman
- Cesare Gravina as Ludani's Tenement Neighbor
- Dorothy Seastrom as Mannequin
- Sally Rand as Mannequin / Dancer
- Billy Seay as Little Boy

== Preservation ==
A print of Fifth Avenue Models is held at the UCLA Film & Television Archive in Los Angeles.

== Bibliography ==
- Goble, Alan. The Complete Index to Literary Sources in Film. Walter de Gruyter, 1999.
