= Sara Ware Bassett =

American author

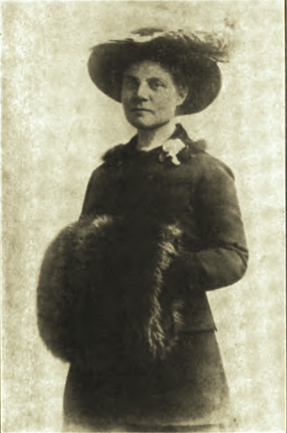
Sara Ware Bassett

Sara Ware Bassett (October 22, 1872 in Newton, Massachusetts – July 18, 1968) was an American writer of fiction and nonfiction. Her novels primarily deal with New England characters, and most of them are set in two fictional Cape Cod villages she created, Belleport and Wilton. Her first novel, Mrs. Christy's Bridge Party, was published in 1907. She subsequently wrote more than 40 additional novels, continuing to write and publish into the late 1950s. Many of her novels focus on love stories and humorously eccentric characters. A number of her works are available as free e-books. Two of her novels, The Taming of Zenas Henry (1915) and The Harbor Road (1919), were adapted as the motion pictures Captain Hurricane (1935) and Danger Ahead (1921).

For much of her life, Bassett divided her time between homes in Cape Cod and Princeton, Massachusetts. She also taught kindergarten in the public schools of Newton, Massachusetts.

She died in Newton Centre, Massachusetts on July 18, 1968.

== Bibliography ==
=== Educational books ===
- The Story of Lumber (1912)
- The Story of Wool (1913)
- The Story of Leather (1915)
- The Story of Glass (1916)
- The Story of Sugar (1917)
- The Story of Porcelain (1919)
- Paul and the Printing Press (1920)
- Steve and the Steam Engine (1921)
- Ted and the Telephone (1922)
- Walter and the Wireless (1923)
- Carl and the Cotton Gin (1924)

=== Novels ===
- The Taming of Zenas Henry (1915)
- The Harbor Road (1919)
- The Wayfarers at the Angels (1918)
- The Wall Between (1920)
- Flood Tide (1921)
- Twin Lights
- Granite and Clay
- The Green Dolphin (1926)
- White Sail
- Shifting Sands (1933)
- South Cove Summer
- Within the Harbor (1948)
- The Whispering Pine (1953)
