= Hilliard Karr =

American actor

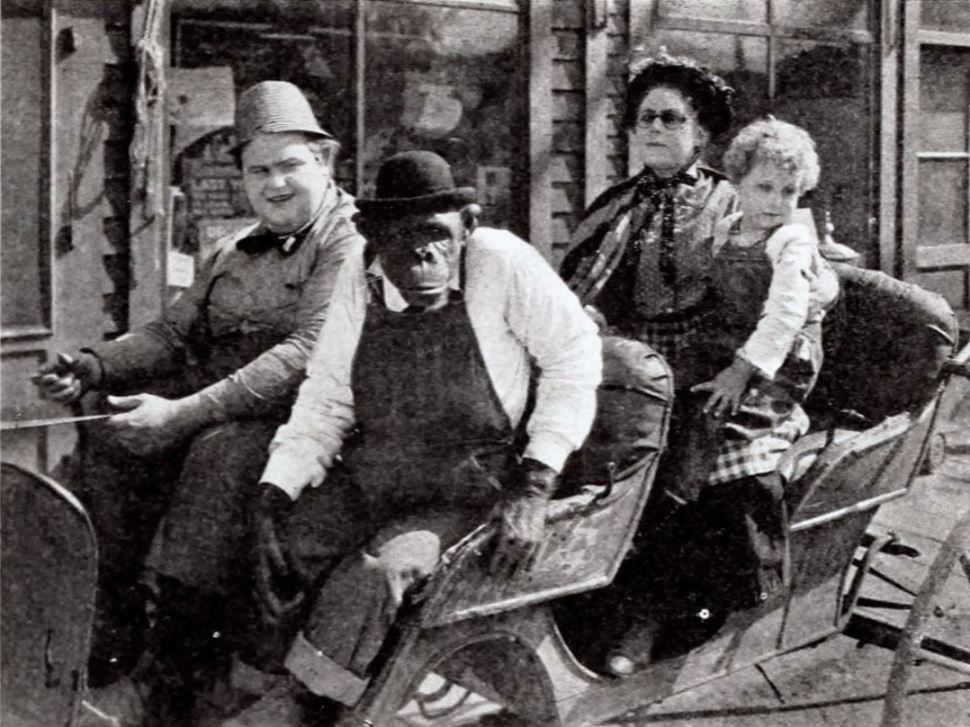
Movie still from A Small Town Hero

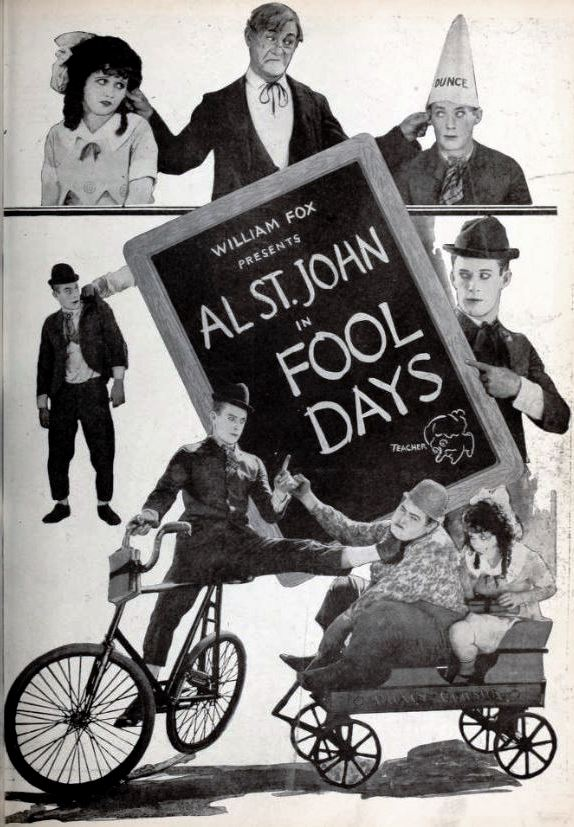
Movie still from Fool Days

Hilliard Karr (1899 – 1945) was an American comedic actor. He appeared in a series of short films with fellow heavyweights Frank Alexander and Bill "Kewpie" Ross (Ton of Fun).

Scenes from the Tons of Fun episode Heavy Love were used on an episode of The Funny Manns.

== Partial filmography ==
- Fool Days (1921)
- Ain't Love Grand? (1921), part of the Sunshine Comedies series
- A Small Town Hero (1922)
- Human Hearts (1922)
- Big Stakes (1922)
- A Family Row (1924)
- What an Eye (1924) a haunted house comedy for Universal Pictures
- A Rough Party (1925)
- Three Wise Goofs (1925)
- Tailoring (1925)
- The Circus Cyclone (1925)
- The Heavy Parade (1926)
- Three of a Kind (1926)
- Oh, What a Night! (1926)
- Backfire (1926)
- Heavy Love (1926)
- Old Tin Sides (1927)
- Campus Romeos, (1927)
- How High is Up (1927)
- Three Missing Links (1927)
- You're Next (1927)
- Standing Pat (1928)
