= Cesare Gravina =

Italian actor (1858–1954)

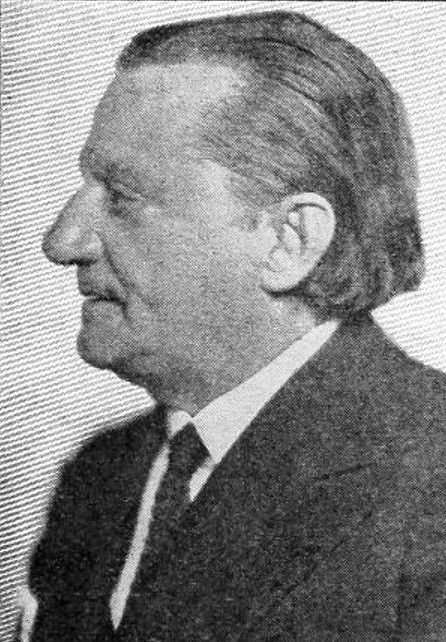
- Gravina in 1924
- Born: 23 January 1858; Naples, Kingdom of the Two Sicilies
- Died: 16 September 1954 (aged 96); New York City, U.S.
- Years active: 1911–1929

Cesare Gravina (23 January 1858 – 16 September 1954) was an Italian actor of the silent era who appeared in more than 70 films from 1911 to 1929.

Born in Naples, Gravina was an orchestra conductor in his native Italy. As the conductor at La Scala, he worked with performers such as Mary Garden and Enrico Caruso. At some point, he left music to become a character actor, not explaining his reasons for the career change with anyone. As the owner of many theaters in South America, Gravina became financially secure to retire from motion pictures by 1924, but he preferred to remain in acting.

Gravina starred as the philosopher and travelling theatre manager Urso, in Paul Leni's The Man Who Laughs (1928).

== Partial filmography ==
- The White Pearl (1915) - Setsu
- Madame Butterfly (1915) - The Soothsayer
- Poor Little Peppina (1916) - Villato
- Hulda from Holland (1916) - Apartment Neighbor (uncredited)
- Less Than the Dust (1916) - Jawan
- The Price She Paid (1917) - Moldini
- The Siren (1917) - Her Father
- The Fatal Ring (1917)
- Miss Nobody (1917) - 'Daddy' Crespi
- Let's Get a Divorce (1918) - Head Waiter
- The Mysterious Client (1918) - Ton Cavallo
- The Street of Seven Stars (1918) - Minor Role
- Marriage For Convenience (1919) - Lazzare
- Mothers of Men (1920) - Mr. Schultz - Gaston Glass
- Scratch My Back (1920) - Johoda
- The Penalty (1920) - Art Teacher (uncredited)
- Madame X (1920) - Victor
- From Now On (1920) - Tony Lomazzi
- The Leopard Woman (1920) - Arab (uncredited)
- Beach of Dreams (1921) - Prof. Epnard
- God's Country and the Law (1921) - 'Poleon
- Foolish Wives (1922) - Cesare Ventucci
- Daddy (1923) - Cesare Gallo
- Merry-Go-Round (1923) - Sylvester Urban
- Circus Days (1923) - Luigi, the Clown
- The Hunchback of Notre Dame (1923) - (uncredited)
- The Humming Bird (1924) - Charlot
- The Virgin (1924) - The Money Lender
- The Family Secret (1924) - Tomaso Silvano
- Butterfly (1924) - Von Mandescheid
- The Rose of Paris (1924) - George
- Those Who Dare (1924) - Panka
- Greed (1924) - Zwerkow - Junkman (uncredited)
- The Charmer (1925) - Señor Sprott
- Contraband (1925) - Pee Wee Bangs
- The Phantom of the Opera (1925) - Opera House Manager (uncredited)
- Fifth Avenue Models (1925) - Ludani's Tenement Neighbor
- An Enemy Of Men (1925) - Tony Caruso
- The Man in Blue (1925) - Tony Sartori
- Don Dare Devil (1925) - Esteban Salazar
- A Woman's Faith (1925) - Odillon Turcott
- The Circus Cyclone (1925) - Pepe
- Flower of Night (1925) - Servant
- Monte Carlo (1926) - Count Davigny
- The Midnight Sun (1926) - Opera Director
- The Blonde Saint (1926) - Ilario
- The Magic Garden (1927) - Maestro
- The Road to Romance (1927) - Castro
- Cheating Cheaters (1927) - Tony Verdi
- The Divine Woman (1928) - Gigi
- The Trail of '98 (1928) - Henry Kelland - Berna's Grandfather
- The Man Who Laughs (1928) - Ursus
- How to Handle Women (1928) - Tony
- The Wedding March (1928) - Martin Schrammell - Mitzi's father
- Burning the Wind (1929) - Don Ramón Valdez
