= The Circus Cyclone =

1925 film directed by Albert S. Rogell

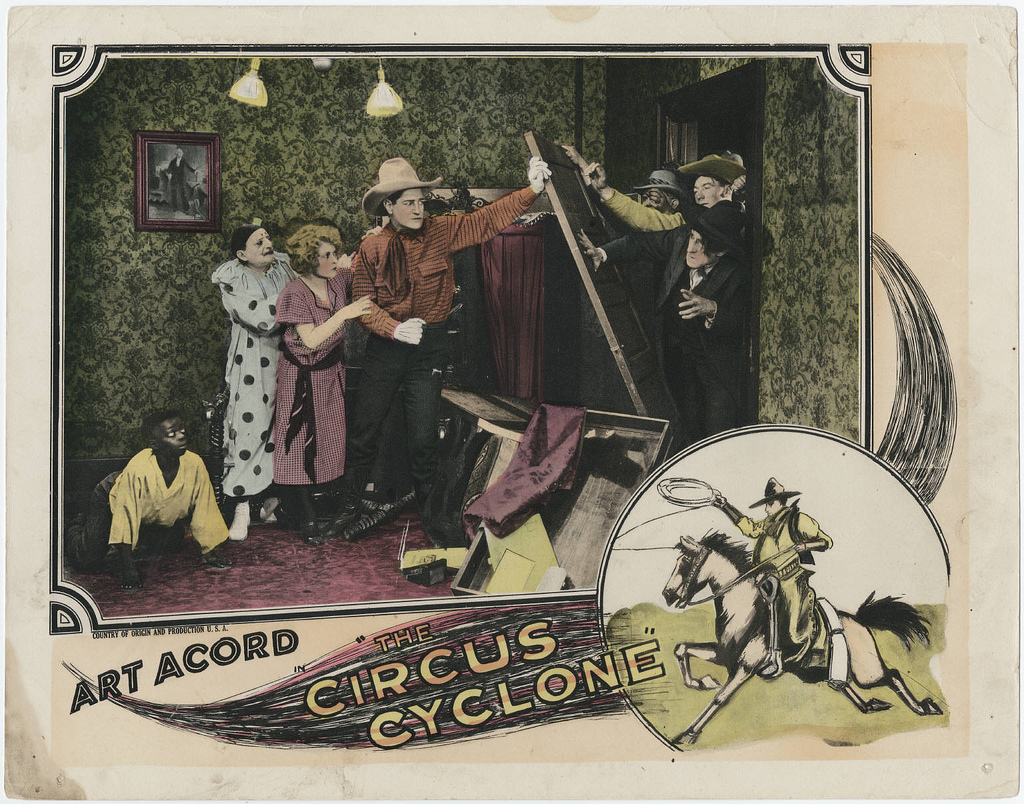
- Lobby card
- Directed by: Albert S. Rogell
- Screenplay by: Albert S. Rogell
- Starring: Art Acord; Moe McCrea; Nancy Deaver; Cesare Gravina; Albert J. Smith; Hilliard Karr
- Cinematography: Pliny Horne
- Production company: Universal Pictures
- Distributed by: Universal Pictures
- Release date: October 4, 1925
- Running time: 50 minutes
- Country: United States
- Language: Silent (English intertitles)

The Circus Cyclone is a 1925 American silent Western film written and directed by Albert S. Rogell. The film stars Art Acord, Moe McCrea, Nancy Deaver, Cesare Gravina, Albert J. Smith, and Hilliard Karr. The film was released on October 4, 1925, by Universal Pictures.

== Plot ==
As described in a film magazine, Jack Manning, a cowboy on a lark at the circus, admires a poster of Omar and wishes he could own the horse, the most beautiful animal he has ever seen. Omar is the ring horse of Doraldina, the pretty bareback rider, who is being bullied by Steve Brant, owner of the circus. The unwelcome advances have kept old clown Pepo, her father, in a state of consternation and dread. In an effort to intimidate Doraldina, Brant lashes down the horse and cruelly whips the helpless animal while his bullies hold the frantic young woman. Hearing her calls, Jack goes to her rescue and knocks out Brant. He agrees to buy the horse but only has $800, which Brant refuses, but does accept as a wager against the horse if Jack will accept his challenge to a public ring battle. The bout is advertised and the whole town pays admission to see the fight. Jack does not know that Brant is an ex-champion boxer, and is almost beaten when he is spurred on by the pleas of Doraldina to victory. Jack takes the animal home, but Brant is determined to get it back. He sends Doraldina, who is the only person the horse will follow, threatening her with expulsion if she fails to return with the big drawing card to the circus. At the same time, one of his henchmen is robbing the town's bank, leaving behind evidence that will turn suspicion on Pepo and send him to prison, getting him out of Brant's way. The plot is overheard by a young black boy who feels indebted to Jack for a previous kindness shown to him. Jack catches Doraldina in the act of stealing the horse and is sadly disappointed in her ingratitude, especially as he has grown to love her. The horse returns to the main tent when he hears the circus band play. Jack follows and sees a commotion around the courthouse, where Pepo is beset with a lynching mob. Brant and his henchmen, seeing that the boy has overheard the plot, take the loot and escape in a fast car. Jack follows on horseback, and by taking a shortcut heads off the car, which goes over an embankment, killing the occupants. Jack returns the money to the bank, and stops the mob as they are breaking down the door to get Pepo. All is well between him and Doraldina, who decides to try her hand at being a housewife.

== Cast ==
- Art Acord as Jack Manning
- Moe McCrea as Eczema Jackson
- Nancy Deaver as Doraldina
- Cesare Gravina as Pepo
- Albert J. Smith as Steve Brant
- Hilliard Karr as Fatty
- Frank Austin as Joe Dokes
- Gertrude Howard as Mrs. Jackson
- Jim Corey as Greasey
- Ben Corbett as Referee
- Rex the Dog as Rex
- Raven the Horse as Omar

== Preservation ==
With no holdings located in archives, The Circus Cowboy is considered a lost film.
