= Paul and the Printing Press =

1920 novel by Sara Ware Bassett

Paul and the Printing Press is a 1920 novel by the American author Sara Ware Bassett. It was published by Boston, Little, Brown, and Company.

== Plot ==
In 1920, Paul Cameron is the president at the Burmingham High School. He notes that other schools have a school paper and suggests that one should be created at his own school too. The March Hare is created and Paul and his fellow students work hard to make it a success.
