= Drums of Love =

1928 film directed by D. W. Griffith

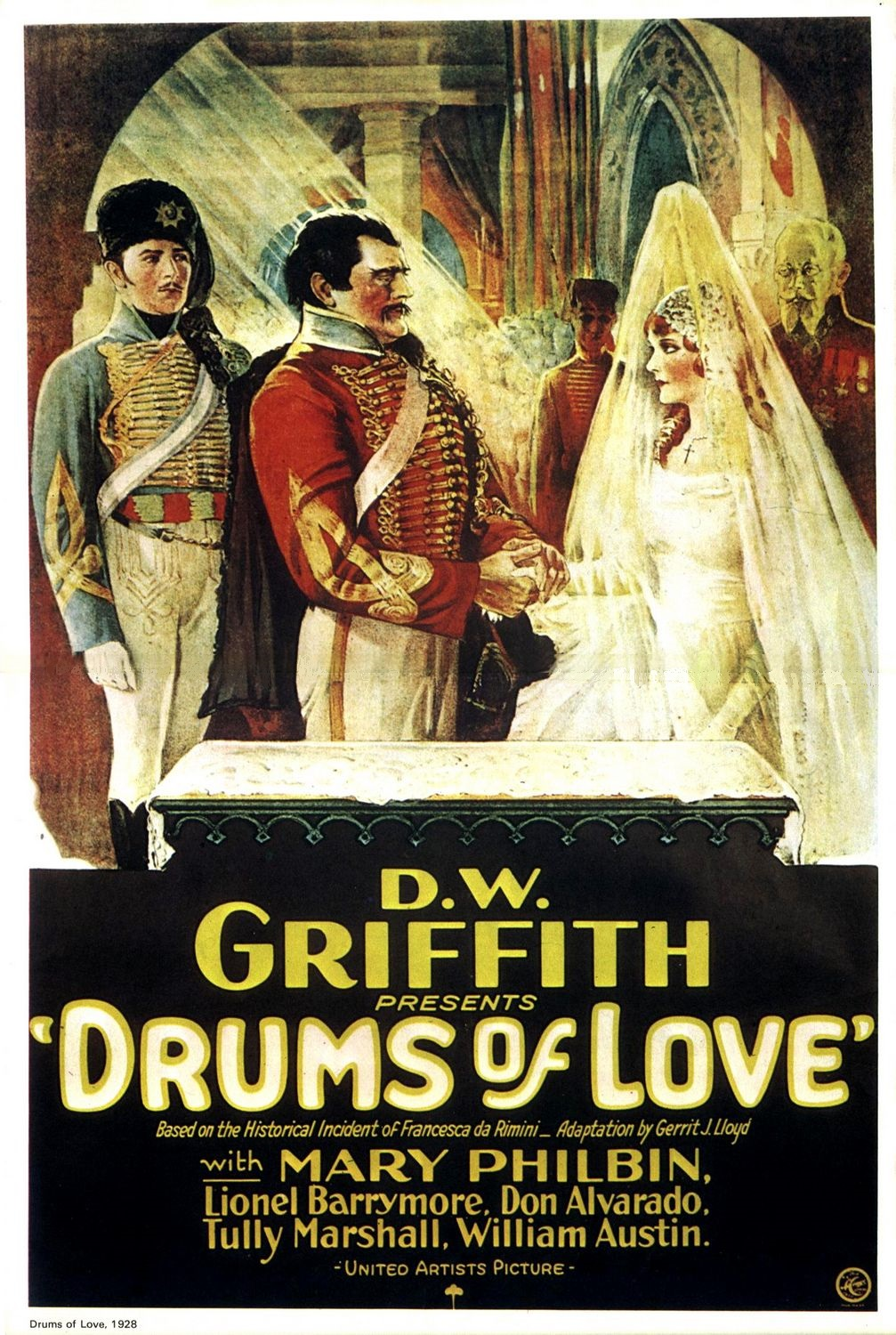
- Theatrical poster
- Directed by: D. W. Griffith
- Written by: Gerrit J. Lloyd
- Produced by: D. W. Griffith
- Starring: Mary Philbin; Lionel Barrymore
- Cinematography: G. W. Bitzer; Karl Struss; Harry Jackson
- Edited by: James Smith
- Music by: Charles Wakefield Cadman; Sol Cohen
- Distributed by: United Artists
- Release date: January 24, 1928
- Running time: 100 minutes
- Country: United States
- Language: Silent (English intertitles)
- Budget: $350,000 or $505,000
- Box office: $600,000

Drums of Love is a 1928 American silent romance film directed by D. W. Griffith starring Mary Philbin, Lionel Barrymore, and Don Alvarado. Two endings, one happy and the other sad, were shot.

== Plot ==
After finding out her father and his estate are in danger, Princess Emanuella saves his life by marrying Duke Cathos de Alvia, a grotesque hunchback. She actually is in love with Leonardo, his attractive younger brother. They already had an affair before the marriage, but continued to meet each other in secret. In the end, Cathos finds out about his wife's unfaithfulness and stabs both his wife and brother to death.

== Cast ==
- Mary Philbin as Princess Emanuella
- Lionel Barrymore as Duke Cathos de Alvia
- Don Alvarado as Count Leonardo de Alvia
- Tully Marshall as Bopi
- William Austin as Raymond of Boston
- Eugenie Besserer as Duchess de Alvia
- Charles Hill Mailes as Duke de Granada
- Rosemary Cooper as the maid
- Joyce Coad as the little sister

== Production ==
The film was a modernized adaptation of a Francesca da Rimini opera. The settings were changed from 14th century Italy to 19th century South America. The film was directed by D. W. Griffith, whose career was in decline. He imposed a happy ending, but this idea was rejected.

The female lead went to Mary Philbin, who was on loan from another studio, Universal Pictures. Cinematographer Karl Struss was especially impressed with the actress and tested her for two weeks with different wigs. Philbin later called working with Griffith a "dream come true."

== Reception ==
The film was received as one of D. W. Griffith's weakest. Critics agreed that Griffith did not know how to handle the film's theme and story the way Tod Browning could have. Both the critics and the audience agreed that the poor reception was mainly due to the ending.

== Preservation ==
Prints of Drums of Love are in the collections of the Library of Congress and George Eastman Museum.
