= The Scarlet Letter (1926 film) =

1926 film

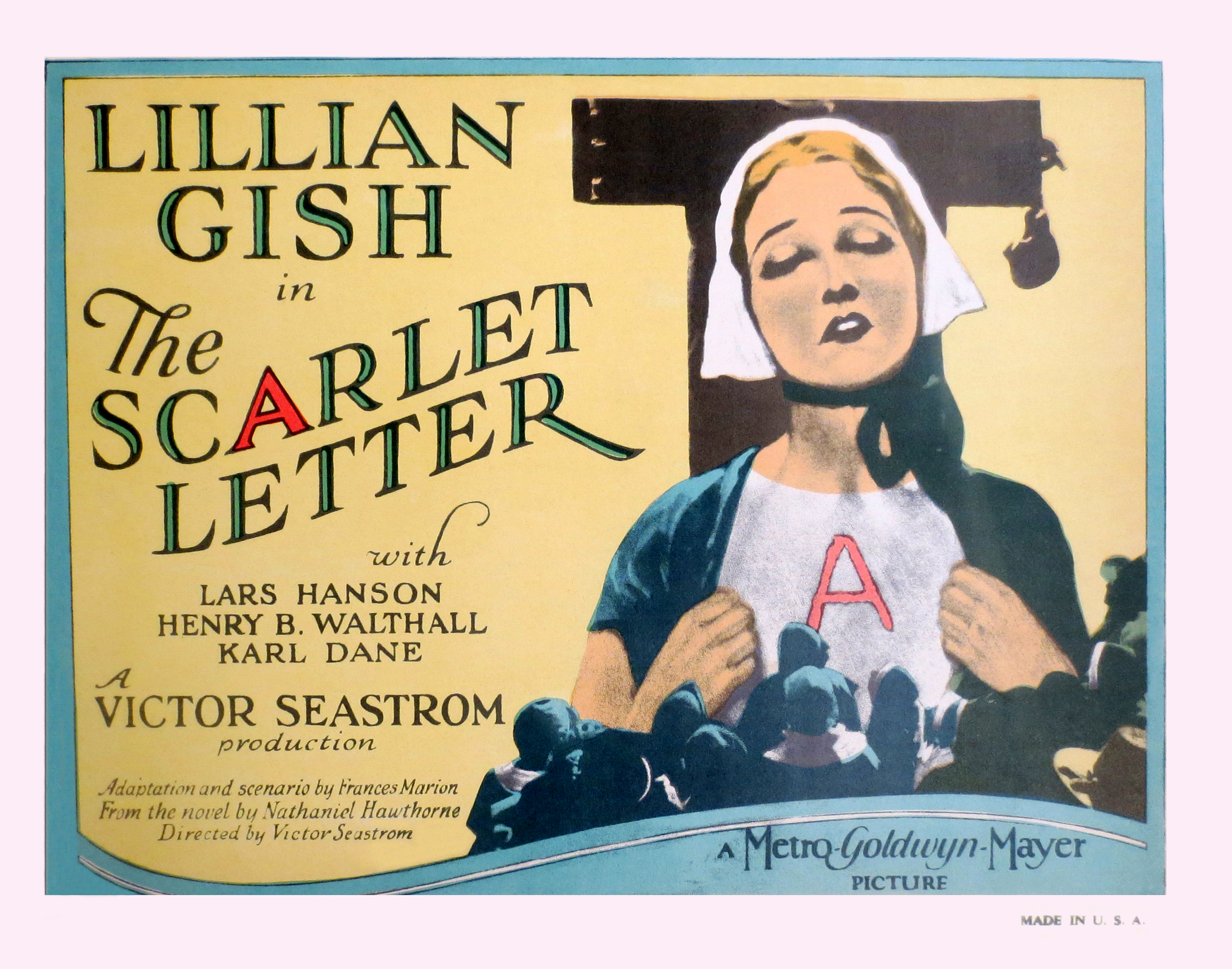
- Lobby card
- Directed by: Victor Seastrom
- Written by: Frances Marion
- Based on: The Scarlet Letter; 1850 novel by Nathaniel Hawthorne
- Produced by: Victor Seastrom
- Starring: Lillian Gish; Lars Hanson
- Cinematography: Hendrik Sartov
- Edited by: Hugh Wynn
- Music by: William Axt (uncredited); David Mendoza (uncredited)
- Distributed by: Metro-Goldwyn-Mayer
- Release date: August 9, 1926
- Running time: 115 minutes
- Country: United States
- Language: Silent with English intertitles

The Scarlet Letter (full film)

The Scarlet Letter is a 1926 American silent drama film based on the 1850 novel of the same name by Nathaniel Hawthorne and directed by Swedish filmmaker Victor Sjöström (credited as Victor Seastrom). Prints of the film survive in the MGM/United Artists film archives and the UCLA Film and Television Archive. The film is now considered the best film adaptation of Hawthorne's novel.

== Cast ==
- Lillian Gish as Hester Prynne
- Lars Hanson as The Reverend Arthur Dimmesdale
- Henry B. Walthall as Roger Chillingworth (credited as playing Roger Prynne)
- Karl Dane as Master Giles
- William H. Tooker as The Governor
- Marcelle Corday as Mistress Hibbins
- Fred Herzog as The Jailer
- Jules Cowles as The Beadle
- Mary Hawes as Patience
- Joyce Coad as Pearl
- James A. Marcus as A Sea Captain
- Nora Cecil as Townswoman (uncredited)
- Iron Eyes Cody as Young Native American at Dunking (uncredited)
- Dorothy Gray as Child (uncredited)
- Margaret Mann as Townswoman (uncredited)
- Polly Moran as Jeering Townswoman (uncredited)
- Chief Yowlachie as Native American (uncredited)
- May Boley as Jeering Townswoman (uncredited)

== Production ==
“Early in the film Gish, as Prynne, loses her bonnet chasing a songbird through a summer glade. When the wind catches her waist-long tresses, Gish appears for an instant as if she had stepped into a painting by Botticelli...Seastrom seizes on Gish's sensuality throughout the film...bringing this largely faithful adaptation down squarely on the side of love and ardent sensuality.”— Film critic Paul Malcolm

The film was the second one Gish made under her contract with M-G-M and a departure from the ingénue roles she had performed in service to director D.W. Griffith. (Her first M-G-M picture was directed by King Vidor, an adaption of La bohème with co-star John Gilbert, in which she played the pathetic consumptive Mimi.) She asked production manager Louis B. Mayer specifically to make The Scarlet Letter: his agreement was reluctant, due to M-G-M's concern that censors would object to a frank depiction of Nathaniel Hawthorne's character, Hester Prynne, whose romantic indiscretions unleash a wave of reactionary bigotry. Director Seastrom disabused these expectations with an opening intertitle "establishing Prynne's [Gish's] ordeal as 'a story of bigotry uncurbed.'"

Shooting took under two months. The production cost a total of $417,000 when factoring out $48,000 overhead costs.

== Reception ==
The film made a profit of $296,000.

Winner of the Photoplay Award for the Best Pictures of the Month (October 1926).

The film is recognized by American Film Institute in these lists:

- 2002: AFI's 100 Years...100 Passions – Nominated
- 2003: AFI's 100 Years...100 Heroes & Villains:
  - Hester Prynne – Nominated Hero

== See also ==
- Lillian Gish filmography
