= Joyce Coad =

American actress

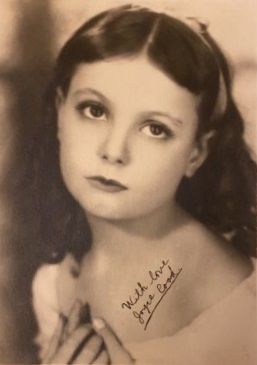
- Born: April 14, 1917
- Died: May 3, 1987 (aged 70); March Air Force Base, Riverside County, California, U.S.
- Occupation: Actress
- Years active: 1926–1933

Joyce Coad (April 14, 1917 – May 3, 1987) was an American child actress in motion pictures.

== Child prodigy ==
Coad's foster father was Raymond E. Coad. By the age of five she became a reader of children's stories on radio station KHJ in Los Angeles.

== Film actress ==
Coad moved to Los Angeles at the same time in 1926 that Metro Goldwyn Mayer was searching for a "million dollar baby". She won the contest conducted by the Los Angeles Evening Express. She also received a contract to perform on radio station KNX in Hollywood. Her programs included recitations, songs, and stories.

She performed the role of Pearl in The Scarlet Letter (1926), a film which featured Lillian Gish. Louis B. Mayer chose Victor Seastrom to direct the movie. Drums of Love (1928), directed by D. W. Griffith, is set in the middle of the nineteenth century in South America. Coad appeared in the role of the little sister in a screen production which starred Lionel Barrymore, Don Alvarado, and Tully Marshall.

For some reason, there was a break in her films from 1928 to 1931, after which the number of her film appearances declined. She played the role of Elsa The German Milkmaid in Captured! (1933). In June 1937 Coad was cast in The Deerslayer, which was being filmed by Standard Pictures. She was twenty years old.

== Death ==
Coad died at March Air Force Base, Riverside County, California in 1987, aged 70, from undisclosed causes.

== Select filmography ==
Year	Film	Role	Notes
1926	The Devil's Circus	Little Anita	
1926	The Scarlet Letter	Pearl	
1927	Children of Divorce	Little Kitty	
1927	Mother	Betty Ellis	
1927	The Magic Garden	Amaryllis Minton, as a child	
1927	One Woman to Another	The Niece	
1928	Drums of Love	The Little Sister	
1931	Blood and Thunder		(uncredited)
1931	Devotion	Elsie	(uncredited)
1931	X Marks the Spot	Gloria	
1933	Captured!	Elsa the German Milkmaid	
1934	Woman Unafraid	Evelyn	
