= $50,000 Reward =

1924 film

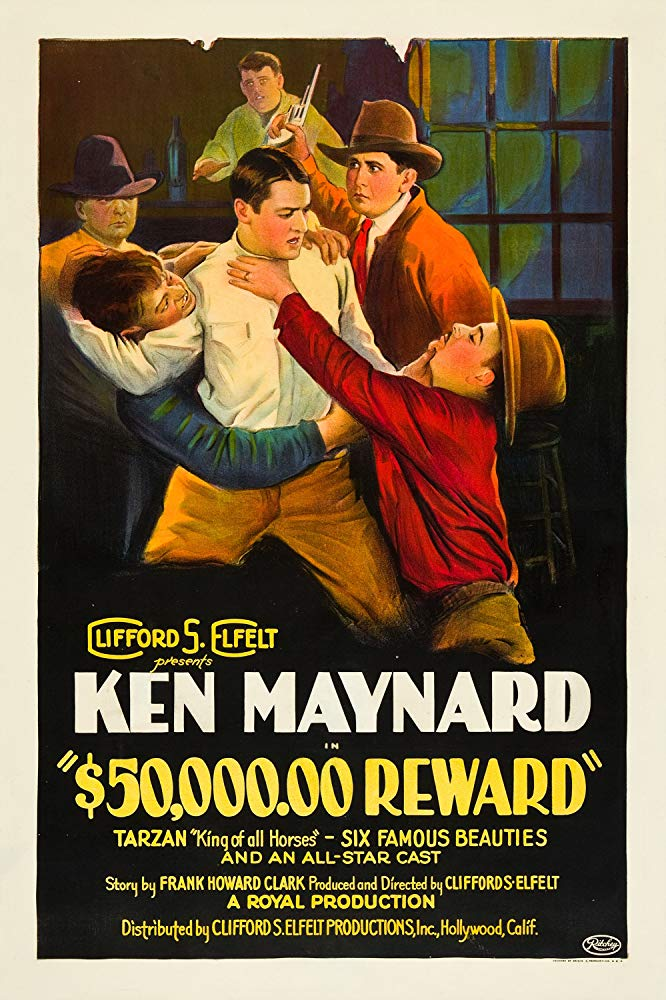
- Directed by: Clifford S. Elfelt
- Written by: Frank Howard Clark
- Produced by: W. J. Charles Davis; Clifford S. Elfelt
- Starring: Ken Maynard; Esther Ralston; Bert Lindley
- Cinematography: Bert Longenecker
- Production company: Clifford S. Elfelt Productions
- Distributed by: Davis Distributing Division
- Release date: December 1924
- Running time: 55 minutes
- Country: United States
- Languages: Silent; English intertitles

$50,000 Reward is a 1924 American silent Western film directed by Clifford S. Elfelt and starring Ken Maynard, Esther Ralston and Bert Lindley.

== Plot ==
The film is about Tex Sherwood, a man who has just acquired a piece of land. There is a plot twist when he finds out that this land is soon to be irrigated by a dam. Asa Holman, the banker, knows that the ownership of property deed must be registered the next day, but does not let Tex know. Instead, he offers a $50,000 reward for his capture.

The film is set in western Montana in the 1920s during a time when men rode horses as a means of transport. The film begins with a screen that says, "In Montana, things often happen with a surprising suddenness." This is followed by a black screen with the words, "Help!" appearing multiple times. What appears to be a brawl including guns is unfolding across the street where a business owner notices and calls for help. Then, we see a black screen that says, "Get him boys, don't let him get away." Then there is some more brawling, followed by a black screen that says, "I've got what you're after, try and get it." Some more brawling, followed by a screen that says, "50,000 reward to the man who gets him." The men start running after Tex Sherwood as it appears, and he runs away on his horse. The group of men all hop on their horses and follow Ken until they see he has gone up a hill with his horse and the rest of them can not seem to get up there. A black screen then appears and it says, "Tex Sherwood cowpuncher from the Rio Grande, the cause of all the excitement, who has come to Montana to transact some business of a personal nature," Then, we see a black screen that says, "Buck Scofield, the leader of a lawless outfit," and "Tarzan, Tex Sherwood's pal, by himself." Here, we can tell that Tarzan is Ted Sherwood's horse. Then we see Ted and a black screen that says, "We fooled 'em boy, didn't we?" Tarzan nods, and Sherwood rides him down onto the other side of the hill.

The scenes change, and we are now in an office. A black screen says, "Asa Holman, president of the bank, and a big man in local affairs." We see this character who appears to be Asa Holman speaking and a black screen that says, "Tex Sherwood is in town with the papers. I've offered Buck and his gang $50,000 reward to get those documents." We then see a man reply, he is Eli Higgins, Holman's lawyer. Holman and Higgins exchange back and forth. Holman looks concerned, saying "I have millions at stake. If he records those papers, I am ruined."

At this point in the film, we find out why it is that Holman is so concerned. We find out that Holman is a sponsor for a large reclamation project, part of which is a million dollar dam nearing completion in the mountains.

All of this takes place during the first 5 minutes of the film and sets the course for the plot to unfold. On the one hand, we have Ted Sherwood, which has just received a piece of land. And on the other hand, we have Asa Holman, the president of the bank, who has a conflict of interest in Sherwood's acquirement. For this reason, Holman has placed a bounty on Sherwood and has a group of men trying to capture Sherwood and bring him to Holman.

== Cast ==
- Ken Maynard as Tex Sherwood
- Esther Ralston as Carolyn Jordan
- Bert Lindley as Anthony Jordan
- Edward Peil Sr. as Buck Scofield
- Lillian Leighton as Mrs. Miller
- Charles Newton as Pa Miller
- Frank Whitson as Asa Holman
- William F. Moran as Eli Higgins
- Augusta Ain as Freckles
- Ananias Berry as Snowball
- Olive Trevor as Follies Girl
- Fern Lorraine as Follies Girl
- Katherine DeForrest as Follies Girl
- Edythe Flynn as Follies Girl
- Grace Fay as Follies Girl
- Nancy Zann as Follies Girl

== Production ==
It is a black and white silent film, and one of the directors (Clifford S. Elfelt) longest running time film.

This film was one of the first features for Ken Maynard, the main actor who plays Ted Sherwood, who quickly became a hugely popular star of early westerns. Esther Ralston, a beautiful and popular actress of silent films, appears as Maynard's leading lady.
