= The Prodigal Wife =

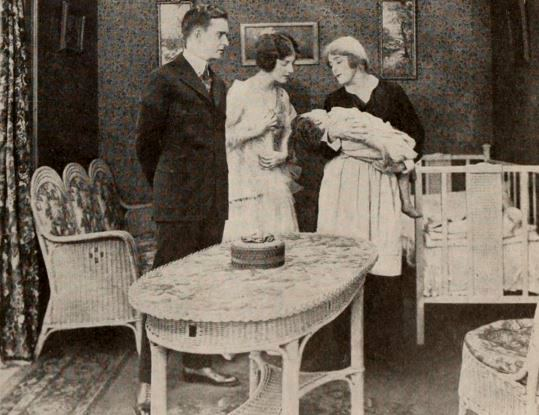
- Still with Harris Gordon, Lucy Cotton, and Mary Boland
- Directed by: Frank Reicher
- Written by: Eve Unsell
- Based on: "The Flaming Ramparts" by Edith Barnard Delano
- Produced by: Screencraft Pictures
- Starring: Mary Boland
- Cinematography: Ira B. Schwartz
- Production company: Screencraft Productions
- Distributed by: Pioneer Film; State's Rights basis
- Release date: December 1918
- Running time: 6 reels
- Country: United States
- Language: Silent (English intertitles)

The Prodigal Wife is a lost 1918 American silent drama film directed by Frank Reicher and starring Mary Boland. It is based on a short story by Edith Barnard Delano that appeared in Harper's Magazine.

The film may have been rereleased in 1919 as a 5-reeler.

== Plot ==
As described in a film magazine, Dr. Frederick Farnham (Bloomer) and his wife Marion (Boland) live a precarious existence in a cheap boarding house. Unhappy because she believes she is neglected, Marna runs off with another boarder who says he has "struck it rich". Dr. Farnham returns home to tell his wife that their days of poverty are over as he has obtained a position on the staff of a hospital, but finds that he and his four-year-old daughter Marna have been deserted. He tells her that her mother is dead and was a wonderful person. Marion goes down and down and becomes a shell of her former self and believes her daughter is dead. Years later, driven to extreme poverty, the mother determines to seek her husband out to obtain some relief. The doctor is now well-to-do and Marna (Cotton) has grown to womanhood. Marion goes to the doctor's home and does not find him there, but discovers her daughter in the flesh before her. Adroitly she finds out that Marna worships her "dead" mother, and Marion leaves, determined to sin no more. Marna marries a writer, Dallas Harvey (Gordon), and Marion becomes the family nursemaid after Marna has a child. When temptation comes to Marna the same way it did to Marion years earlier, Marion divulges her story and saves her daughter from sin. Dr. Farnham overhears the counsel and forgives his wife and begs her to return to him, but she refuses, declaring that she intends to devote her life to saving others just as she saved her daughter.

== Cast ==
- Mary Boland as Marion Farnham
- Lucy Cotton as Marna Farnham
- Raymond Bloomer as Dr. Frederick Farnham
- Alfred Kappeler as Thomas Byrne
- Harris Gordon as Dallas Harvey
- Vincent Coleman as Victor Middleton
- Mrs. Stuart Robson (aka May Waldron) as Mrs. Dovey
