= Edith Barnard Delano =

American short story writer, screenwriter, playwright and novelist

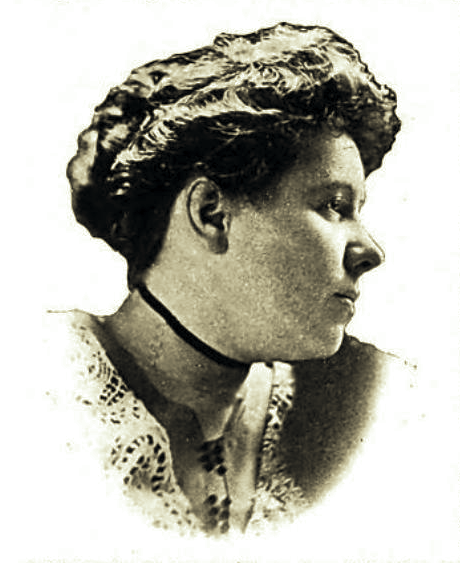
- Born: December 14, 1874; Washington, D.C.
- Died: September 7, 1946; Deerfield
- Occupation: Writer

Edith Barnard Delano (December 14, 1874 – September 7, 1946) was an American short story writer, screenwriter, playwright, and novelist. Delano wrote novels and stories for a number of publications, such as Good Housekeeping. Her works were adapted for several silent films and she served as screenwriter for others. Two of those films featured Mary Pickford: Rags (1915) and Hulda from Holland (1916).

== Biography ==
Edith Sinclair Barnard was born in Washington, D.C., on December 14, 1874. Her parents were Dr. William Theodore Barnard and Emma Jane Thomas Barnard. Dr. Barnard built the first Chicago elevated railroad; in connection with the B. & O. Railroad, he originated the traveling library idea, and introduced into this country the first system of employee relief. Her grandfather, Theodore Barnard, one of the founders of the Associated Press, was the only one of her grandparents of New England origin; the others were from Maryland and Virginia.

Delano was educated mostly by governesses, and at Bryn Mawr Preparatory School in Baltimore, where a large part of her girlhood was passed.

Her first story was written in the summer of 1904, and sold to the Woman's Home Companion. Thereafter, she wrote much. Besides her contributions to the leading magazines for many years, she wrote several books. Some of Delano's photoplays that were produced were filmed by the Famous Players Film Company, featuring Mary Pickford, Marguerite Clark, Hazel Dawn, and Marie Doro.

Delano was a member of the Southern Society of the Oranges, the Authors' League of America, and the Vigilantes, the latter an association of authors and artists.

She married James Delano in 1908.

Edith Barnard Delano died on September 7, 1946, in Deerfield, Massachusetts.

== Filmography ==
- Rags (June 1915)
- The Heart of Jennifer (August 1915)
- The White Pearl (October 1915)
- Still Waters (December 1915)
- Hulda from Holland (1916)
- The Prodigal Wife (1918), based on "Flaming Ramparts"
- All Woman (1918), based on When Carey Came to Town (1916)
- The Glorious Adventure (1918)
- The Velvet Hand (1918)
- Gossip (1923)

== Bibliography ==
- Zebedee V (1912)
- The Colonel's Experiment (1913)
- The Land of Content (1913)
- Rags (1915)
- June (1916)
- The White Pearl (1916)
- When Carey Came to Town (1916)
- To-Morrow Morning: Chronicle of the New Eve and the Same Old Adam (1917)
- Two Alike (1918)
- The Way of All Earth (1925)
