= Fools Highway =

1924 film directed by Irving Cummings

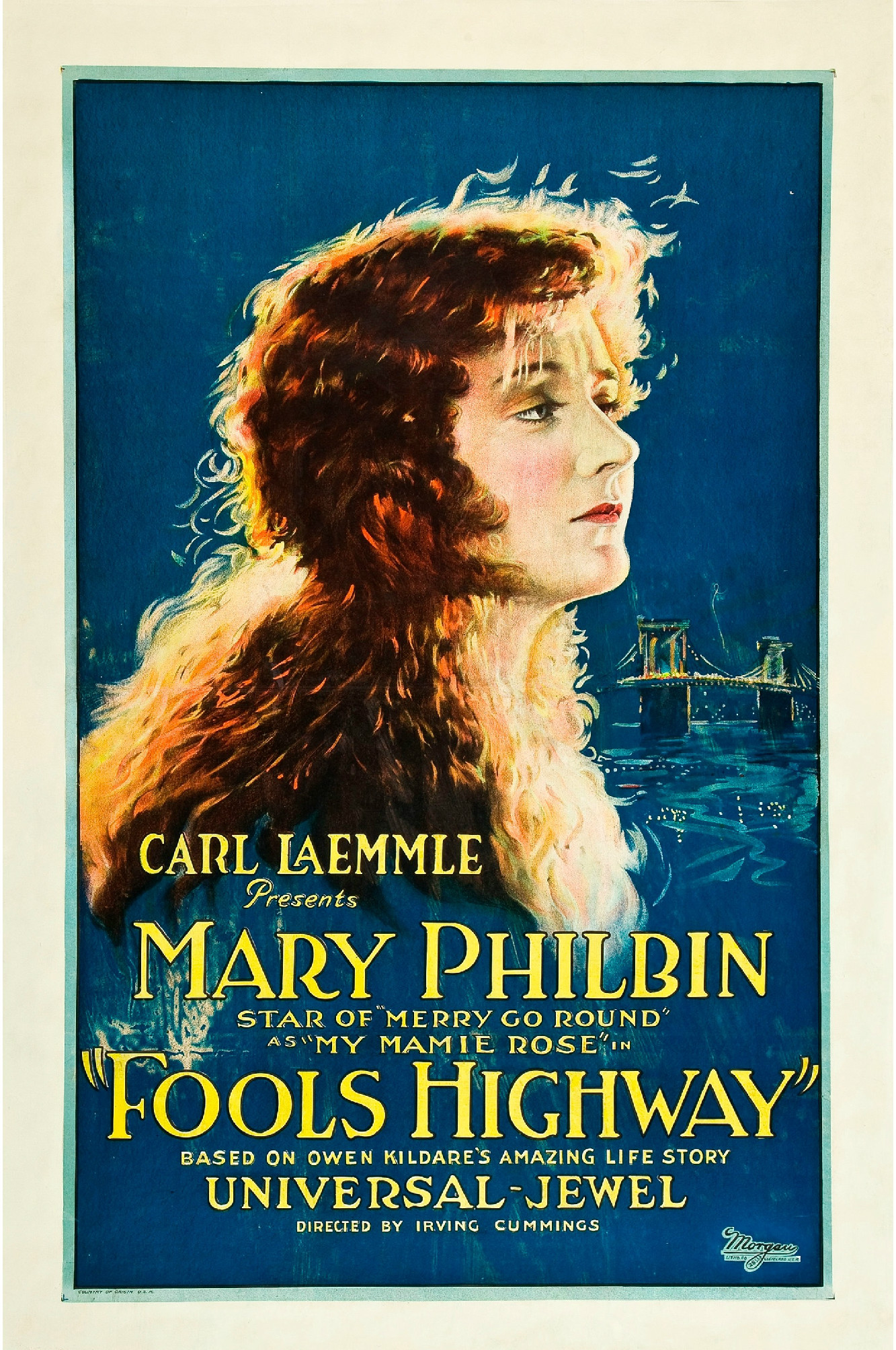
- Poster
- Directed by: Irving Cummings
- Written by: Lenore J. Coffee; Harvey Gates; Emil Forst
- Based on: My Marnie Rose; the Story of My Regeneration by Owen Kildare
- Produced by: Carl Laemmle
- Starring: Mary Philbin
- Cinematography: William Fildew
- Distributed by: Universal Super-Jewel
- Release date: March 1924
- Running time: 7 reels
- Country: United States
- Language: Silent (English intertitles)

Fools Highway is a 1924 American silent romantic drama film directed by Irving Cummings and starring Mary Philbin. The film was produced and released by Universal Pictures.

== Plot ==
As described in a film magazine review, Mamie Rose, little mender of the shop of Old Levi, is loved by Mike Kildare, a pugilist and ward heeler of the Bowery of New York City. She repulses his advances, horrified by his business, but still fascinated by the tough man's brute strength and animal attraction. When he discovers that his love for her is a true and holy thing, he forsakes his gang. They then lay a trap for him and Mike ends up horribly beaten in an underground den. Then follows a gripping endowment, in which Mike wins the love of the young woman and joins forces with society against the law breakers of his former days.

== Cast ==
- Mary Philbin as Mamie Rose
- Pat O'Malley as Mike Kildare
- William Collier, Jr. as Max Davidson
- Lincoln Plumer as Mike Flavin
- Ed Brady as Jackie Doodle
- Max Davidson as Old Levi
- Kate Price as Mrs. Flannigan
- Charles Murray as Mamie's Father
- James Sheridan as Ole Larsen (credited as Sherry Tansey)
- Steve Murphy as Chuck Connors
- Tom O'Brien as Philadelphia O'Brien

== Preservation ==
With no prints of Fools Highway located in any film archives, it is a lost film.
