= The Manicure Girl =

1925 film

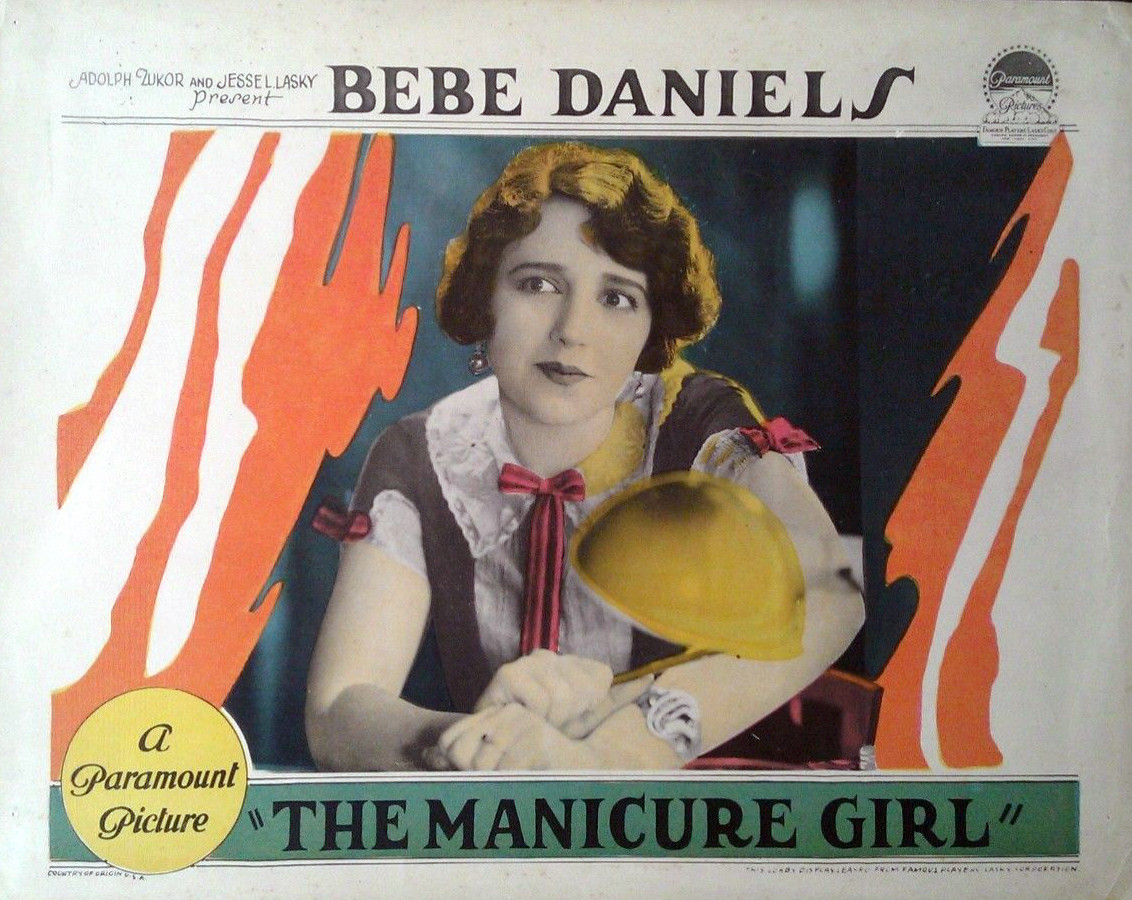
- Lobby card
- Directed by: Frank Tuttle
- Written by: Townsend Martin (scenario)
- Story by: Frederick Hatton; Fanny Hatton
- Produced by: Adolph Zukor; Jesse Lasky
- Starring: Bebe Daniels
- Cinematography: J. Roy Hunt
- Distributed by: Paramount Pictures
- Release date: July 6, 1925
- Running time: 60 minutes
- Country: United States
- Language: Silent (English intertitles)

The Manicure Girl is a 1925 American silent romantic comedy drama film directed by Frank Tuttle and starring Bebe Daniels.

== Plot ==
As described in a film magazine review, a poor young manicurist becomes engaged to a poor young man who has saved enough money to build a bungalow to live in after they are married. The young woman craves riches and becomes interested in a married man who treats her gentlemanly and kindly. This "other" man is becoming estranged from his wife. The manicurist realizes her own influence in wrecking the marriage and, in sympathy with the wife, she effects a reconciliation between the two. Her fiancé lover quarrels with her, but there is a happy ending when the two decide to hasten their marriage.

== Cast ==
- Bebe Daniels as Maria Maretti
- Edmund Burns as Antonio Luca
- Dorothy Cumming as Flora
- Hale Hamilton as James Morgan
- Charlotte Walker as Mrs. Morgan
- Marie Shotwell as Mrs. Wainwright
- Ann Brody as Mother Luca
- Mary Foy as Mrs. Root-Chiveley

== Production ==
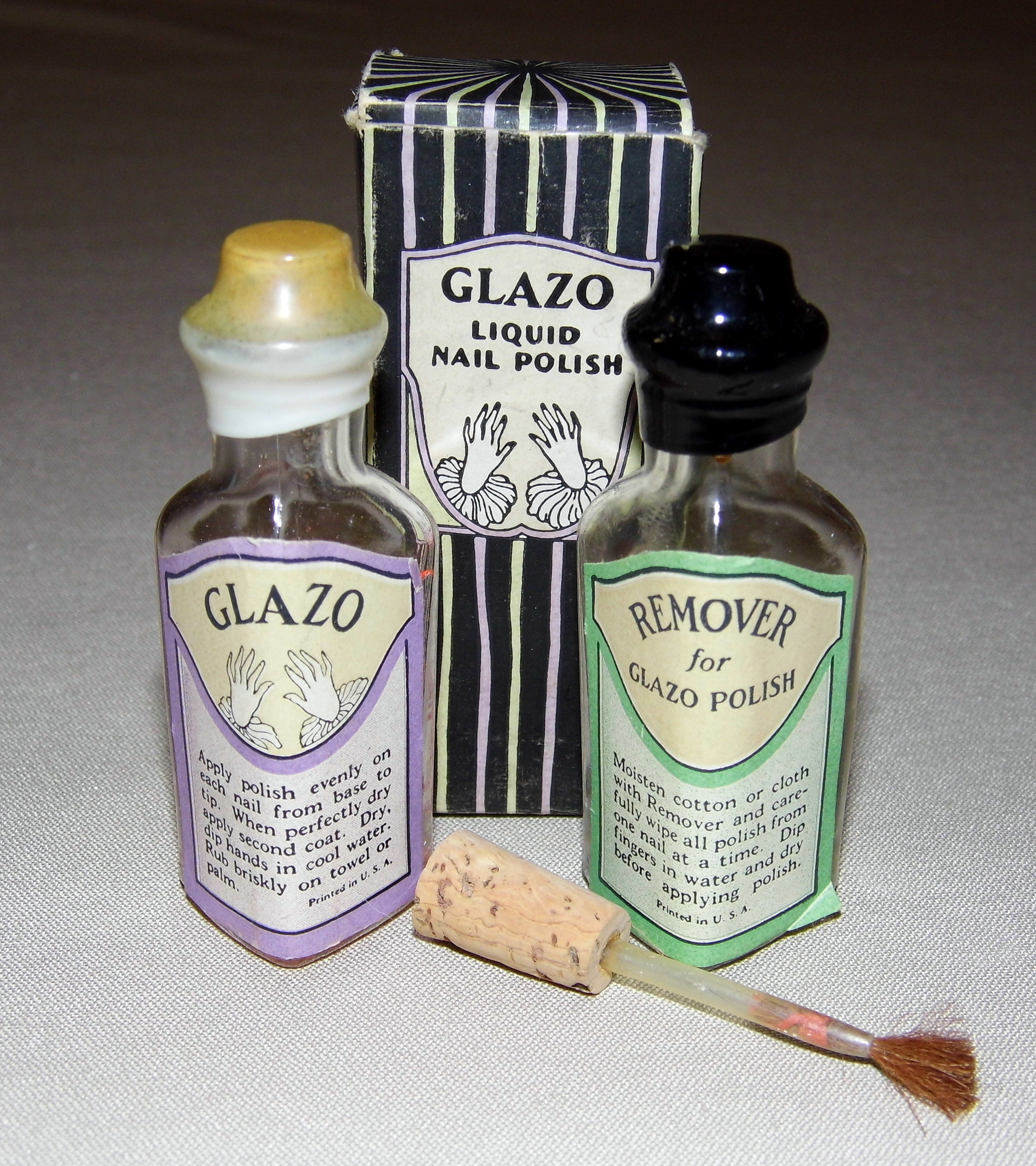
1930s Glazo products

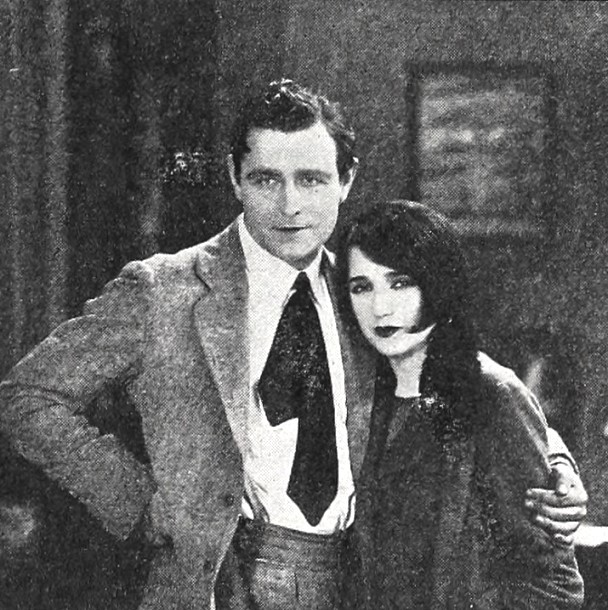
Still of The Manicure Girl featuring Edmund Burns and Bebe Daniels

Paramount Pictures ran an advertising tie-in with the Glazo nail polish company of Cincinnati, Ohio. Movie theaters were encouraged to apply for promotional materials, which would then be distributed among local drug stores that sold Glazo products.

The Film Daily reported that The Manicure Girl was one of the first American films to use the English gyroscopic camera, an early camera stabilizer, which was acquired for the production by Famous Players. It had previously been used on the German film The Last Laugh. The gyroscopic camera was a hand-held unit that allowed the camera operator to smoothly walk and follow actors. Tuttle wrapped filming three days ahead of schedule, to which he partially credited the new camera.

== Reception ==
The Exhibitors Herald listed the "sincerity of acting" as one of the film's highlights. The Los Angeles Times, however, felt the film was underwhelming, and Variety labeled the film “a flop."

Motion Picture News reported that the consensus on the film was that it was a "Very mediocre picture that didn't do well and didn't deserve to do well."

== Preservation ==
With no prints of The Manicure Girl located in any film archives, it is a lost film.
