= Rags (1915 film) =

1915 film by James Kirkwood

- Directed by: James Kirkwood
- Written by: Edith Barnard Delano (novel:Rags); Frances Marion; Mary Pickford
- Produced by: Adolph Zukor
- Starring: Mary Pickford
- Cinematography: Emmett A. Williams
- Distributed by: Paramount Pictures
- Release date: August 2, 1915
- Running time: 5 reels
- Country: United States
- Language: Silent film (English intertitles)

Rags is a 1915 silent film produced by Famous Players Film Company and distributed by Paramount Pictures. The film was directed by James Kirkwood and starring Mary Pickford. It survives in various prints between the Library of Congress, the George Eastman Museum and Cinémathèque française. It's available to watch on YouTube since at least 2022.

Though a Zukor produced film, the production was shot at Biograph Studios.

== Cast ==
- Mary Pickford - Alice McCloud/"Rags"
- Marshall Neilan - Keith Duncan
- Joseph Manning - John Hardesty
- J. Farrell MacDonald - Paul Ferguson
