= One Woman to Another =

1927 film

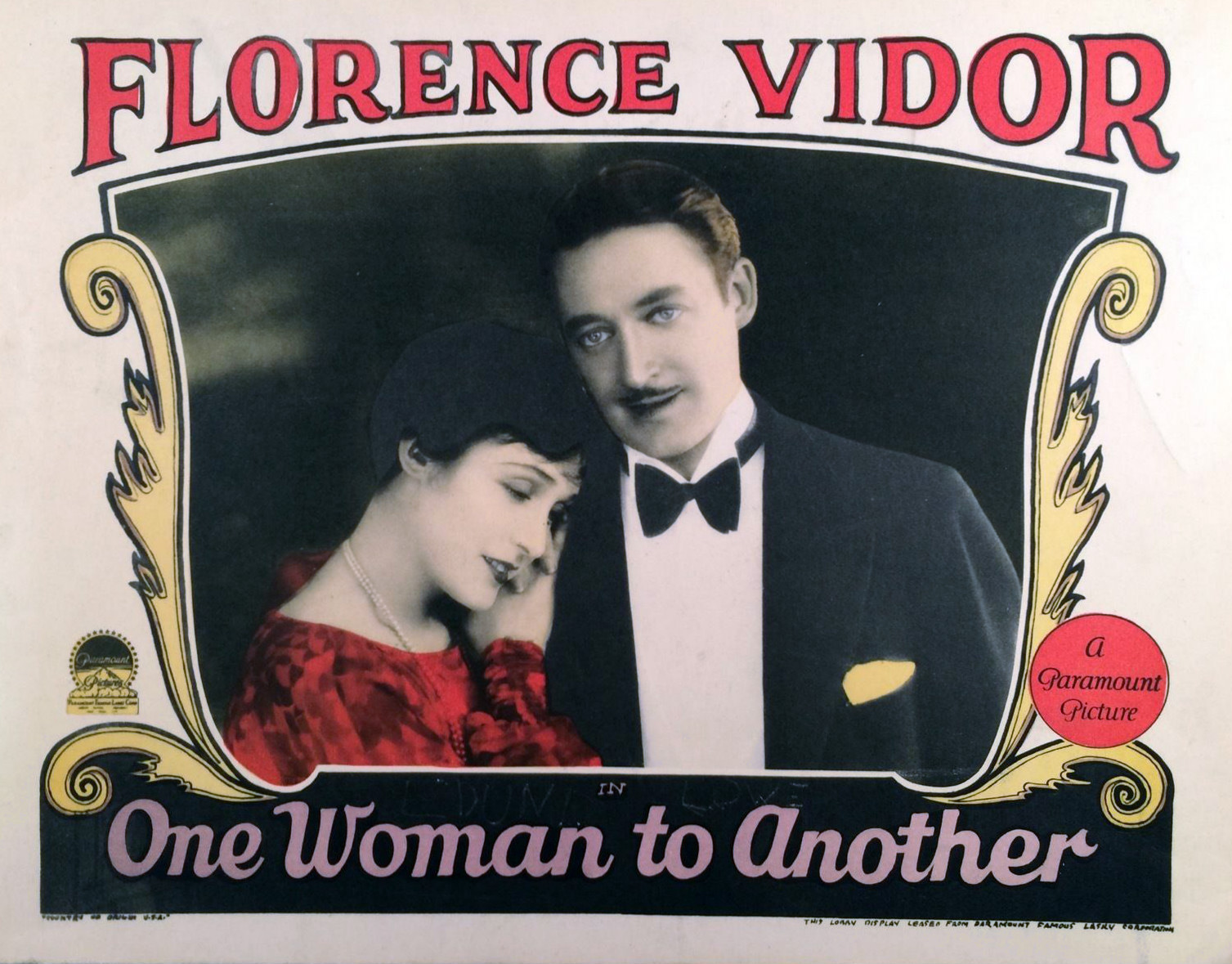
- Lobby card
- Directed by: Frank Tuttle
- Screenplay by: J.L. Campbell; George Marion Jr.
- Based on: The Ruined Lady by Frances Nordstrom
- Produced by: Jesse L. Lasky; Adolph Zukor
- Starring: Florence Vidor; Theodore von Eltz; Marie Shotwell; Hedda Hopper
- Cinematography: L. Guy Wilky
- Production company: Famous Players–Lasky Corporation
- Distributed by: Paramount Pictures
- Release date: September 17, 1927
- Running time: 50 minutes
- Country: United States
- Language: Silent (English intertitles)

One Woman to Another is a lost 1927 American silent comedy film directed by Frank Tuttle and written by J.L. Campbell and George Marion Jr. based upon a play by Frances Nordstrom. The film stars Florence Vidor, Theodore von Eltz, Marie Shotwell, Hedda Hopper, Roy Stewart and Joyce Coad. The film was released on September 17, 1927, by Paramount Pictures.

== Cast ==
- Florence Vidor as Rita Farrell
- Theodore von Eltz as John Bruce
- Marie Shotwell as Mrs. Gray
- Hedda Hopper as Olive Gresham
- Roy Stewart as Rev. Robert Farrell
- Joyce Coad as The Niece
- Jimmy Boudwin as The Nephew
