= Under Fire (1926 film) =

1926 film

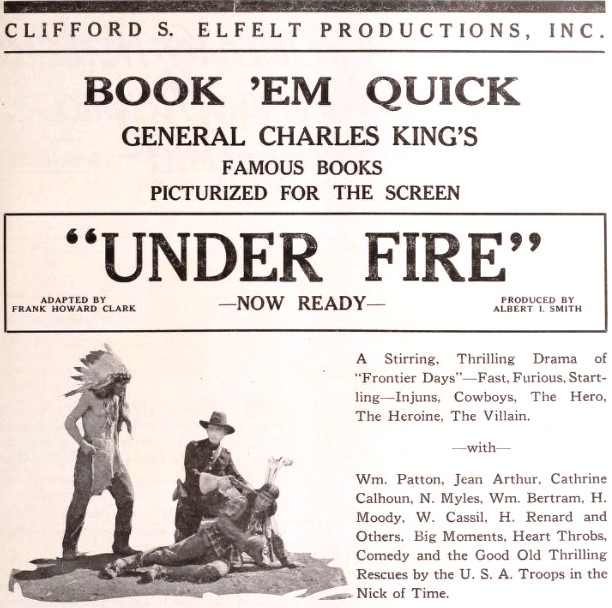
- Advertisement
- Directed by: Clifford S. Elfelt
- Written by: Frank Howard Clark; Charles King (novel)
- Produced by: Albert I. Smith
- Starring: Bill Patton; Jean Arthur; Cathleen Calhoun
- Production company: Clifford S. Elfelt Productions
- Distributed by: Davis Distributing Division
- Release date: January 1, 1926
- Running time: 50 minutes
- Country: United States
- Languages: Silent; English intertitles

Under Fire is a 1926 American silent Western film directed by Clifford S. Elfelt and starring Bill Patton, Jean Arthur, and Cathleen Calhoun.

== Premise ==
A Seventh Cavalry officer is unjustly cashiered during his service in the Southwest on a false charge of desertion.

== Cast ==
- Bill Patton as Lt. Tom Brennan
- Jean Arthur as Margaret Cranston
- Cathleen Calhoun
- Norbert A. Myles
- William Bertram
- Harry Moody
- Bert Lindley as Cmdr. Cranston
- Ervin Renard as Capt. Roger Dawson

== Preservation ==
A print of Under Fire is held by the Cinémathèque québécoise in Canada.

== Bibliography ==
- Langman, Larry. A Guide to Silent Westerns. Greenwood Publishing Group, 1992.
