= May Waldron =

Canadian-born American actress (1861 or 1868 – 1924)

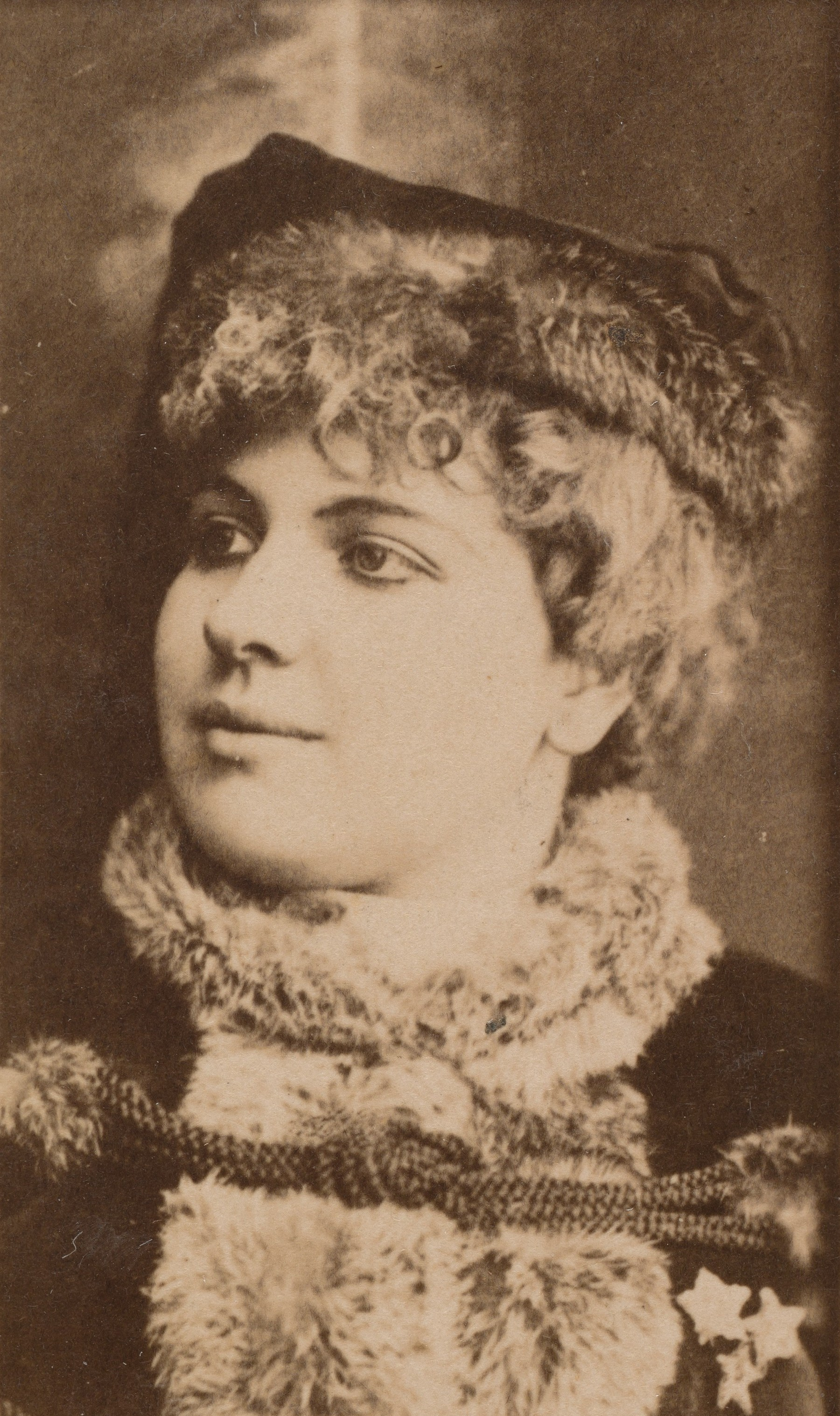
- May Waldron c. 1890
- Born: Mary Waldron Dougherty; November 1, 1868 (some sources give 1861); Hamilton, Ontario
- Died: December 22, 1924; Louisville, Kentucky
- Other names: May Waldron Robson
- Occupation: actress

May Waldron (born Mary Dougherty, November 1, 1861 or 1868 – December 22, 1924), and later known as May Waldron Robson, was a Canadian-born American actress.

== Early life ==
Mary Waldron Dougherty was born in Hamilton, Ontario, the daughter of William E. Dougherty, a newspaper publisher; she was raised in Chicago. Her mother was an actress. May Waldron also lived in Buffalo, New York in her youth.

== Career ==
May Waldron began her career in Chicago, in operettas including H.M.S. Pinafore and The Pirates of Penzance. Waldron's Broadway appearances included roles in Billy (1909), The Country Boy (1910–1911), The Woman Haters (1912), Cousin Lucy (1915), Ladies' Night (1920–1921), and Better Times (1922–1923). She also appeared in touring productions of The Merry Wives of Windsor and She Stoops to Conquer, and in different roles in The Henrietta (1887), in its original run and in its 1901–1902 revival. Her ten film credits came in the silent films Vaccinating the Village (1914), Lured from Squash Center (1914), The Precious Twins (1914), At the Cross Roads (1914), The Trail of the Lonesome Pine (1916), The Gates of Gladness (1918), The Prodigal Wife (1918), The Lost Battalion (1919), His Bridal Night (1919), and A Broadway Saint (1919).

Waldron's weight was a matter of public comment. She was often described as "buxom", or "stout". She fasted for a month to lose weight for a part in 1889; one report compared Waldron to a circus performer and went into detail about her "reducing herself from a mountain of quivering adipose to a lithe, graceful figure, scarcely heavier than the average able bodied woman."

== Personal life ==
Waldron married actor Stuart Robson in 1891; she was widowed when he died in 1903. The two had a son together, Stuart Robson Jr. Waldron, who died suddenly from a stroke in 1924 in Louisville, Kentucky, aged near 60 years.
