= Human Hearts (film) =

1922 film by King Baggot

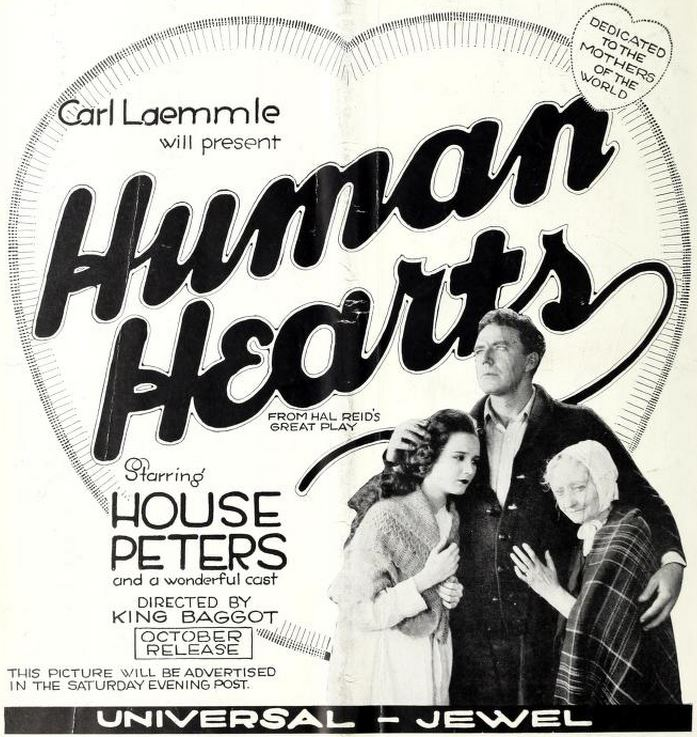
- Directed by: King Baggot
- Written by: Lucien Hubbard; George C. Hull; Marc Robbins
- Based on: Human Hearts by Hal Reid
- Produced by: Carl Laemmle
- Starring: House Peters; Russell Simpson
- Cinematography: Victor Milner; Otto Dyar
- Distributed by: Universal Film Manufacturing Company
- Release date: August 1922
- Running time: 70 minutes
- Country: United States
- Language: Silent (English intertitles)

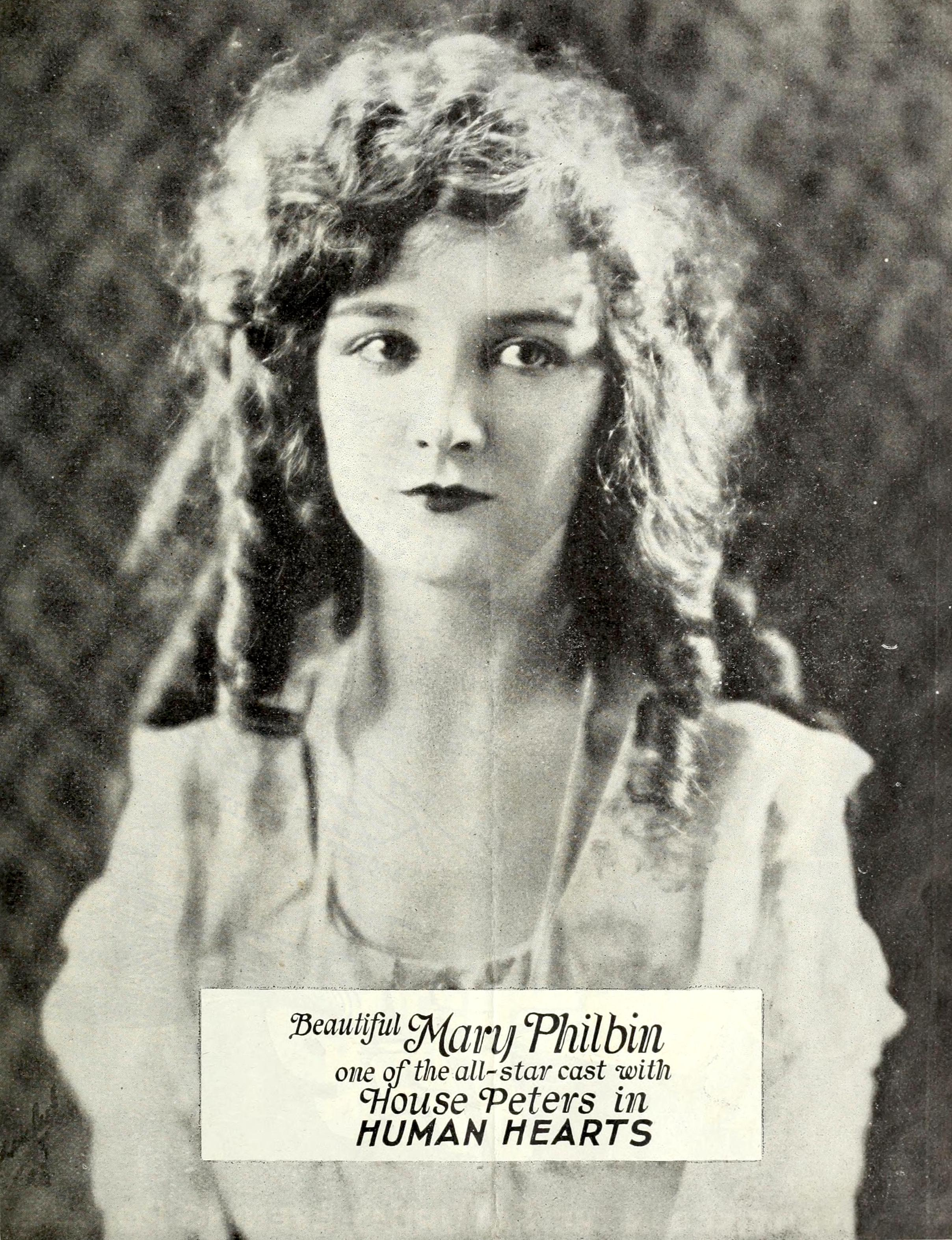
Mary Philbin

Human Hearts is a 1922 American silent rural drama film directed by King Baggot, and produced and distributed by the Universal Film Manufacturing Company. It stars House Peters. It is based on a play of the same name by Hal Reid.

== Plot ==
As described in a film magazine, Tom Logan, an assistant to his father Paul in his blacksmith shop, falls in love with Barbara Kaye, a notorious character who plans to fleece him. Against his father's wishes, Tom marries her and they have a child. Jay Benton, a former friend of Barbara's, is released from prison and comes to see Barbara. Tom's father finds them together, and there is a scuffle and a shot and Paul Logan is killed. Jimmy, Tom's half-wit brother, runs to the village and spreads the news that Tom has killed his own father. Tom is sentenced and convicted to a life sentence. Barbara moves to the city with her child and lives with Benton. Tom saves the life of the warden and gets his sentence reduced. Upon his release, Barbara returns to him and there is a resultant happy ending.

== Cast ==
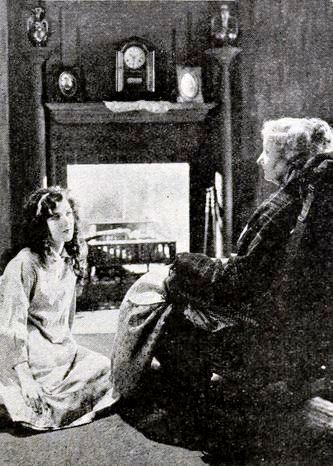
Mary Philbin and Gertrude Claire

- House Peters as Tom Logan
- Russell Simpson as Paul Logan
- Gertrude Claire as Ma Logan
- George Hackathorne as Jimmy Logan
- George West as Old Mose
- Lucretia Harris as Carolina
- Edith Hallor as Barbara Kaye
- Ramsey Wallace as Jay Benton
- Mary Philbin as Ruth
- Hilliard Karr as Seth Bascom
- Snitz Edwards as Ran Schreiber
- Gene Dawson as Little Barbara
- Emmett King as Governor
- Wilton Taylor as Warden

== Preservation ==
Human Hearts is a surviving film with a copy at George Eastman Museum.
