= X Marks the Spot (1931 film) =

1931 film by Erle C. Kenton

- Directed by: Erle C. Kenton
- Produced by: Samuel Bischoff; William Saal
- Distributed by: Tiffany Pictures
- Release date: December 13, 1931
- Running time: 72 minutes
- Country: United States
- Language: English

X Marks the Spot is a 1931 American pre-Code crime drama film directed by Erle C. Kenton and released by Tiffany Pictures, which operated from 1921 to 1932.

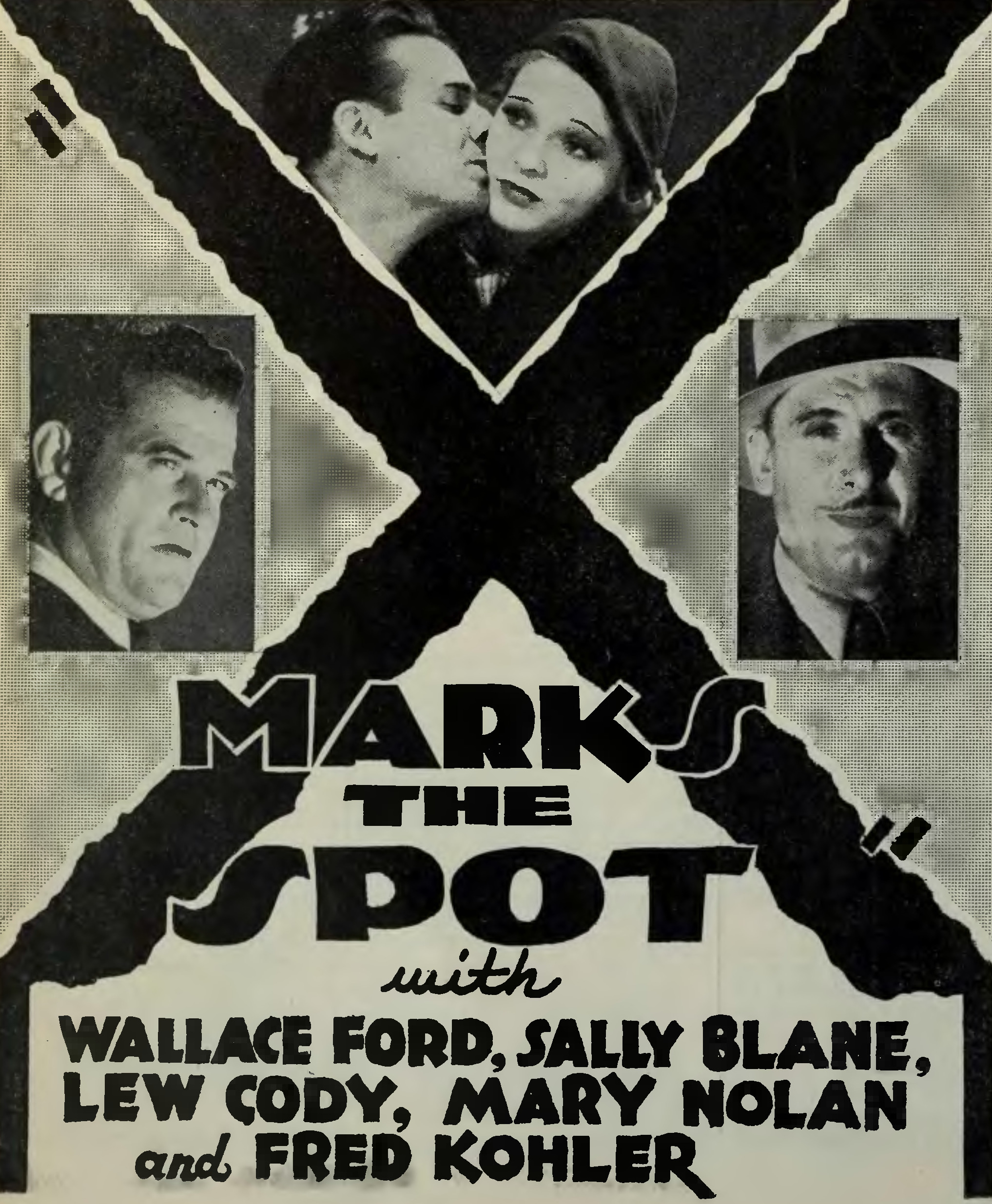
X Marks the Spot ad in The Film Daily, 1932

The source material was remade into a 1942 film of the same name. Helen Parrish appeared in both versions.

== Plot ==
Newspaper columnist Ted Lloyd borrows $5,000 from gangster Eddie Riggs to pay for an operation that might let his younger sister Gloria walk again. Soon after, showgirl Vivian Parker is strangled in her apartment, hours after a fight with Lloyd over a libel release, and the police arrest him for the murder. Lloyd's editor, George Howard, tracks Parker's missing jewels to Riggs, who confesses to Lloyd in private but reminds him of the debt. Riggs is convicted on Lloyd's testimony, then pulls a gun in the courtroom and demands Lloyd face him there, but Howard goes in Lloyd's place and shoots it out with Riggs.

== Cast ==
- Lew Cody as George Howard
- Sally Blane as Sue
- Wallace Ford as Ted Lloyd
- Fred Kohler as Riggs
- Mary Nolan as Vivian Parker
- Virginia Lee Corbin as Hortense
- Helen Parrish as young Gloria
- Joyce Coad as Gloria
- Charles B. Middleton as attorney
- Clarence Muse as servant

== Censorship ==
Before X Marks the Spot could be exhibited in Kansas, the Kansas Board of Review required the elimination of a scene in reel 4, where a black porter is telling a story about dogs and poles.
