= Big Stakes (1922 film) =

1922 film

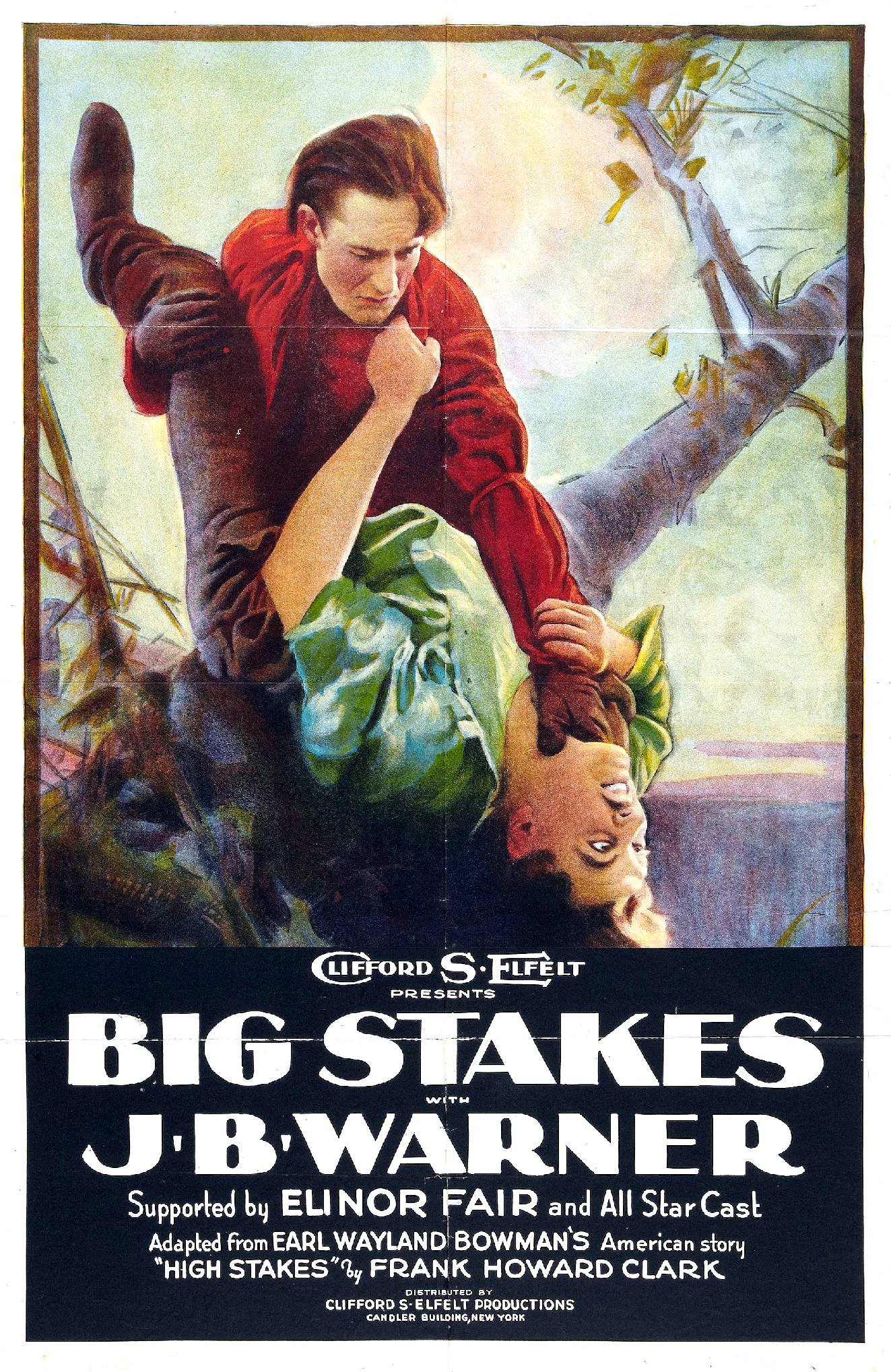
- Theatrical poster
- Directed by: Clifford S. Elfelt
- Screenplay by: Frank Howard Clark
- Based on: "High Stakes" by Earl Wayland Bowman
- Produced by: Franklyn E. Backer
- Starring: J.B. Warner; Elinor Fair
- Cinematography: Clyde De Vinna
- Production company: Metropolitan Pictures
- Distributed by: East Coast Productions
- Release date: August 15, 1922
- Running time: 61 minutes
- Country: United States
- Languages: Silent; English intertitles

Big Stakes is a 1922 American silent Western film directed by Clifford S. Elfelt.

== Plot ==
Texan Jim Gregory heads south-of-the-border where he falls for senorita Mercedes Aloyez but she is betrothed to the handsome El Capitán Montoya.

Hometown girl Mary Moore's purity is under threat from the leader of the local Ku Klux Klan.

A Mexican jumping-bean competition will determine who will win the senorita. Jim is declared the winner, but Mercedes prefers Montoya.

Jim heads back across the border and saves Mary from the clutches of Klan leader Bully Brand.

== Cast ==
- J.B. Warner as Jim Gregory
- Elinor Fair as Señorita Mercedes Aloyez
- Les Bates as Bully Brand
- Willie Mae Carson as Mary Moore
- Hilliard Karr as Sidekick Skinny Fargo
- R. Henry Grey as El Capitán Montoya
- Ethelbert Knott as Pascal
- Louise Emmons as Mercedes Duena (uncredited)

== Preservation status ==
A print of Big Stakes is preserved in the Library of Congress collection.
