= Danger Ahead (1921 film) =

1921 film

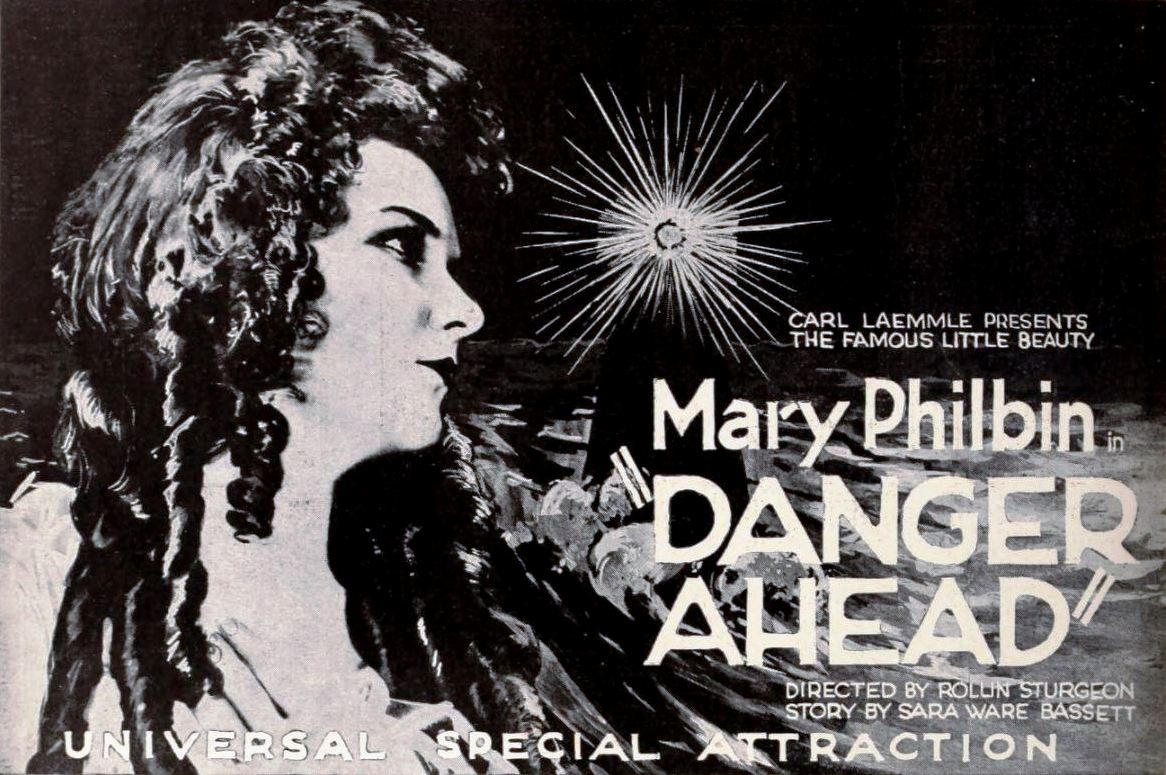
- Advertisement
- Directed by: Rollin S. Sturgeon
- Written by: A. P. Younger
- Based on: The Harbour Road by Sara Ware Bassett
- Produced by: Carl Laemmle
- Starring: Mary Philbin
- Distributed by: Universal Film Manufacturing Company
- Release date: August 8, 1921
- Running time: 5 reels
- Country: United States
- Language: Silent (English intertitles)

Danger Ahead is a lost 1921 American silent romantic drama film directed by Rollin S. Sturgeon and starring Mary Philbin, still a teenager. It was based on a story The Harbour Road by Sara Ware Bassett. Universal Film Manufacturing Company produced and distributed the picture.

== Cast ==
- Mary Philbin as Tressie Harloow
- James Morrison as Norman Minot
- Jack Mower as Robert Kitteridge
- Minna Redman as Deborah Harlow
- George Bunny as Nate Harlow
- George B. Williams as Mr. Minot
- Jane Starr as Dolly Demere
- Emily Rait as Mrs. Della Mayhew
- Helene Caverly as Dora Mayhew
