= Mary Philbin =

American silent film actress (1902–1993)

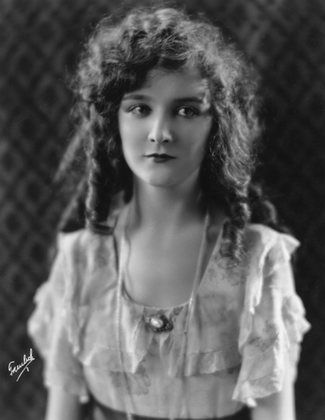
- Philbin c. 1920
- Born: Mary Loretta Philbin; July 16, 1902; Chicago, Illinois, U.S.
- Died: May 7, 1993 (aged 90); Huntington Beach, California, U.S.
- Occupation: Actress
- Years active: 1918–1930
- Partner: Paul Kohner (1923–1927)

Mary Loretta Philbin (July 16, 1902 – May 7, 1993) was an American film actress of the silent film era, who played Christine Daaé in the 1925 film The Phantom of the Opera opposite Lon Chaney, and Dea in The Man Who Laughs alongside Conrad Veidt.

== Early life ==
Philbin was born on July 16, 1902 in Chicago, Illinois, into a middle-class, Irish-American family and raised Catholic. She was an only child, and was named after her mother, Mary. Her father, John Philbin, was born in Ballinrobe, County Mayo, Ireland, and had emigrated to America in 1900.

== Career ==
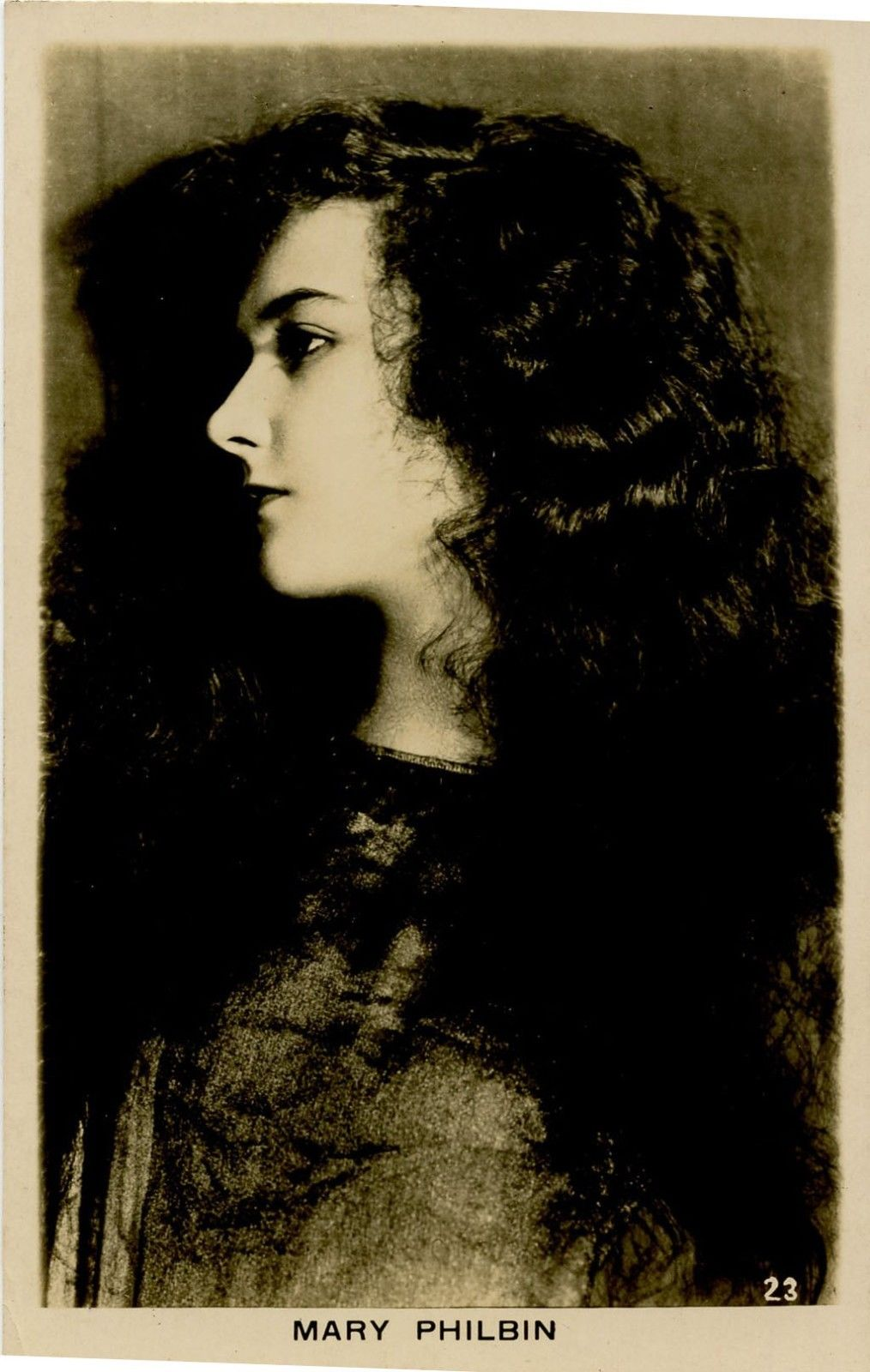
Postcard of Mary Philbin, c. 1923

Philbin began her acting career after winning a beauty contest sponsored by Universal Pictures in Chicago. After she moved to California, Erich von Stroheim signed her to a contract with Universal, deeming her a "Universal Super Jewel."

She made her screen debut in 1921, and the following year was honored at the first WAMPAS Baby Stars awards, a promotional campaign sponsored by the Western Association of Motion Picture Advertisers in the United States.

During the 1920s, Philbin starred in a number of high-profile films, most notably in D. W. Griffith's 1928 film Drums of Love. In 1927, she appeared in Edward Sloman's Surrender with Ivan Mosjoukine, though her most celebrated role was in the Universal horror film The Phantom of the Opera in 1925. Philbin's ethereal screen presence was noted in a 1924 edition of Motion Picture Classic, in which she was referred to as "one of the astonishing anomalies of motion pictures. Pat O'Malley once said of her: 'If I were superstitious I would think that the spirit of some great tragedienne of a forgotten past slipped into Mary's soul when she heard the camera begin to click.'"

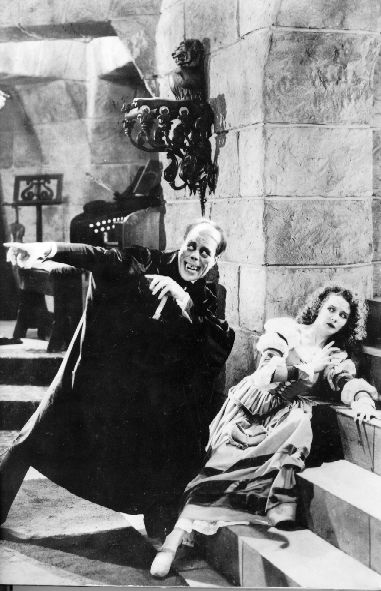
With Lon Chaney in The Phantom of the Opera

Philbin played a few parts during the early talkie era and most notably dubbed her own voice when The Phantom of the Opera was given sound and re-released. She retired from the screen in 1930.

== Later life and death ==
Philbin spent the remainder of her life after leaving the film industry as a recluse, living in the same home in Huntington Beach, California.

In 1988, she attended a memorial service for Rudolph Valentino, her first public appearance since 1931. Her final public appearance was at Los Angeles opening of the Andrew Lloyd Webber musical The Phantom of the Opera in 1989.

She died of pneumonia at age 90 in 1993, and was buried at Calvary Cemetery in East Los Angeles, California.

== Personal life ==
From 1923 to 1927, Philbin was in a relationship with Paul Kohner. They had been introduced to each other by Erich von Stroheim. They secretly became engaged in 1926, but never married due to the disapproval of both Kohner’s mother and Philbin's parents (Kohner was Jewish, and the Philbin family were staunch Catholics). In 1929, they were rumored to be going to marry in June of that year, but it never happened. During their relationship, Philbin had a short-lived affair with Western star Guinn "Big Boy" Williams.

Ultimately, Philbin chose to not marry anyone and Kohner went on to marry Lupita Tovar in 1932. However, when Kohner died, he was found to still have the love letters Philbin had written to him in his possession. She, in turn, had also kept his, and was heartbroken at his death.

== Filmography ==
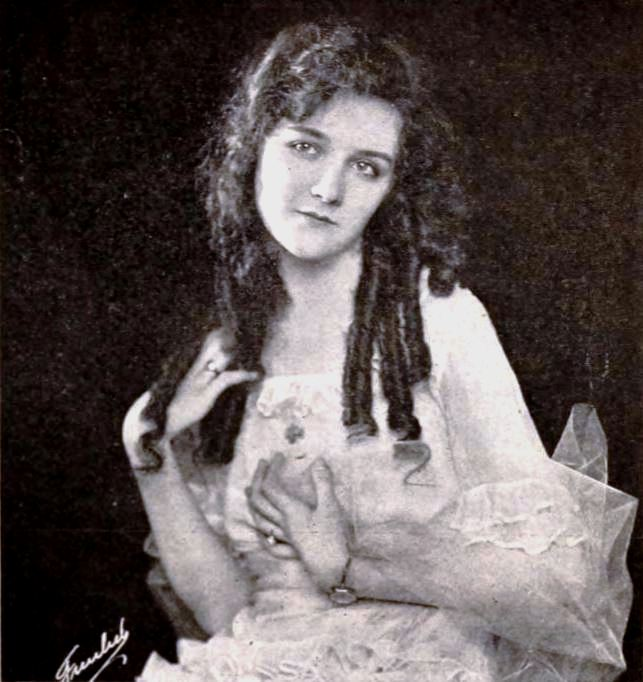
Mary Philbin in Danger Ahead (1921)

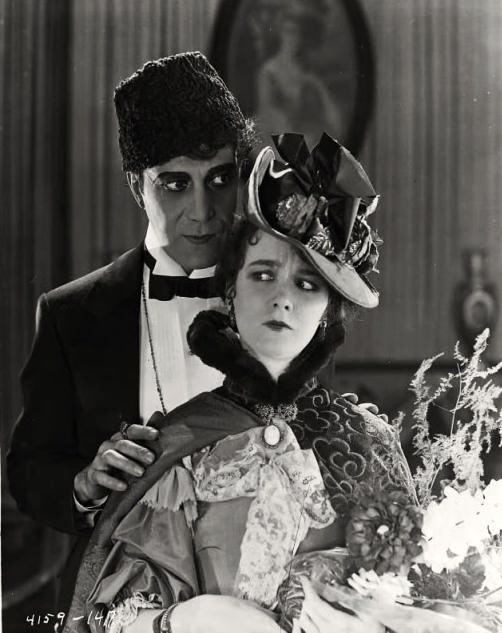
Arthur Edmund Carewe & Mary Philbin in The Phantom of the Opera (1925)

| Year | Title | Role | Notes |
|---|---|---|---|
| 1921 | The Blazing Trail | Talithy Millicuddy | |
| 1921 | Danger Ahead | Tressie Harloow | Lost film |
| 1921 | Twelve Hours to Live | | Short subject |
| 1921 | No Clothes to Guide Him | | Short subject |
| 1921 | Red Courage | Eliza Fay | Lost film |
| 1921 | Sure Fire | | Lost film |
| 1921 | False Kisses | Mary | Lost film |
| 1922 | Foolish Wives | Crippled girl | Uncredited |
| 1922 | The WAMPAS Baby Stars of 1922 | Herself | Short subject |
| 1922 | The Trouper | Mary Lee | Lost film |
| 1922 | Human Hearts | Ruth | |
| 1922 | His First Job | Jimmy's Sweetheart | Short subject |
| 1922 | Once to Every Boy | Jimmy's Sweetheart | Short subject |
| 1923 | Penrod and Sam | Margaret Schofield | |
| 1923 | Merry-Go-Round | Agnes Urban | |
| 1923 | Where is This West? | Sallie Summers | |
| 1923 | The Age of Desire | Margy (age 18) | Lost film |
| 1923 | The Temple of Venus | Moira | Lost film |
| 1923 | The Thrill Chaser | Herself | Cameo appearance Lost film |
| 1924 | Fools Highway | Mamie Rose | Lost film |
| 1924 | The Gaiety Girl | Irene Tudor | Lost film |
| 1924 | The Rose of Paris | Mitsi | |
| 1925 | The Phantom of the Opera | Christine Daaé | |
| 1925 | Fifth Avenue Models | Isoel Ludant | |
| 1925 | Stella Maris | Stella Maris / Unity Blake | |
| 1927 | Life in Hollywood No.3 | Herself | Short subject |
| 1927 | Love Me and the World Is Mine | Hannerl | |
| 1927 | Surrender! | Lea Lyon | |
| 1928 | Drums of Love | Princess Emanuella | |
| 1928 | The Man Who Laughs | Dea | |
| 1929 | Girl Overboard | Joan | Lost film |
| 1929 | The Last Performance | Julie Fergeron | |
| 1929 | The Shannons of Broadway | Tessie Swanzey | Lost film |
| 1929 | After the Fog | Faith Barker | |

== Notes and references ==
=== References ===
- Beck, Calvin Thomas (1978). Scream Queens: Heroines of the Horrors. Macmillan. ISBN 978-0-020-12140-4.
- Sanchez, Nellie Van de Grift (1930). California and Californians. Vol. 3. The Lewis Publishing Co.
- Slide, Anthony (2002). Silent Players: A Biographical and Autobiographical Study of 100 Silent Film Actors and Actresses. University Press of Kentucky. ISBN 978-0-813-12249-6.
