= Married in Name Only =

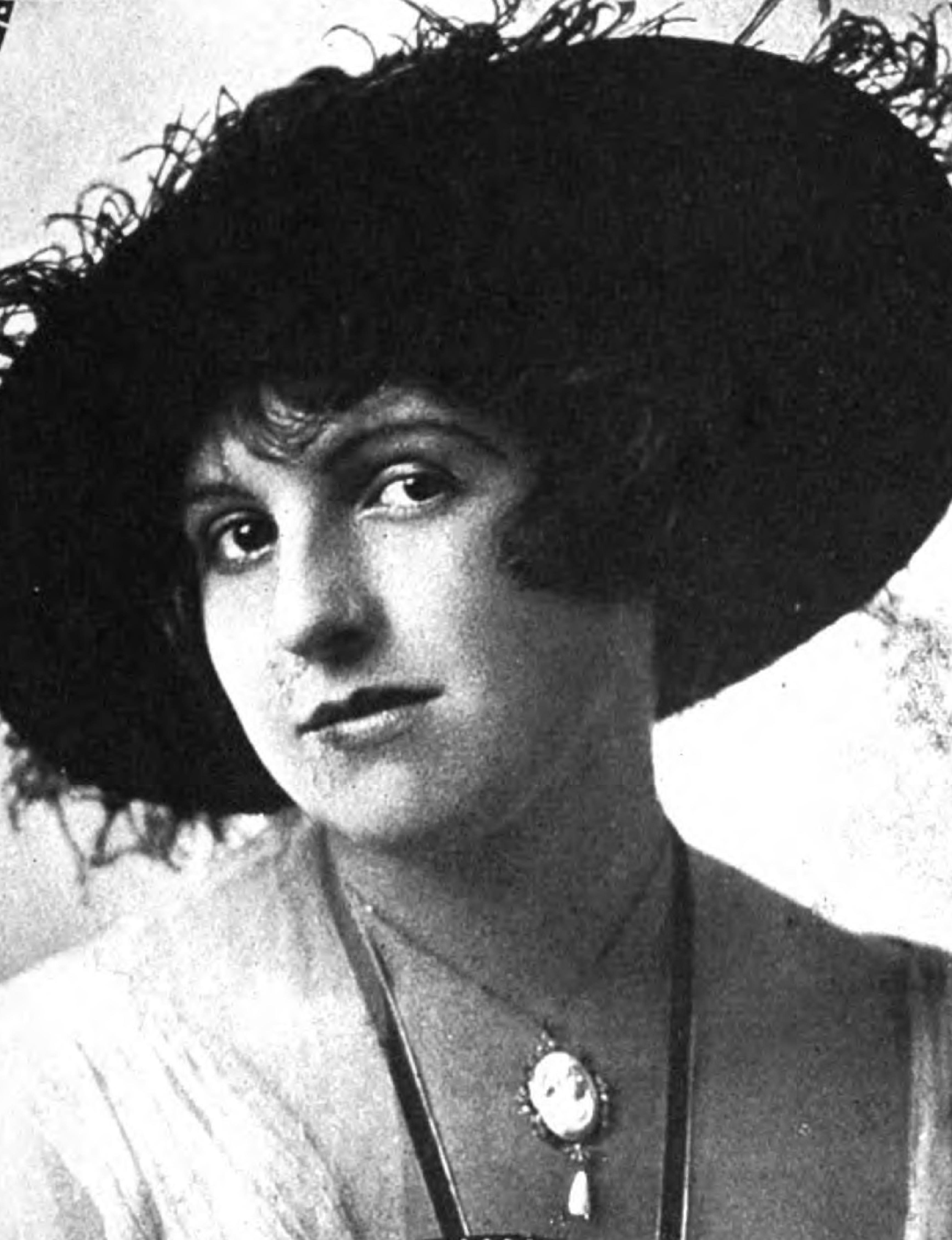
- Gretchen Hartman
- Directed by: Edmund Lawrence
- Written by: Ivan Abramson
- Starring: Gretchen Hartman, Milton Sills, Marie Shotwell
- Distributed by: Ivan Film Productions
- Release date: 1917
- Running time: 6 reels
- Country: United States
- Language: Silent (English intertitles)

Married in Name Only is a 1917 American silent film written by Ivan Abramson and directed by Edmund Lawrence, starring Gretchen Hartman, Milton Sills, and Marie Shotwell.

== Plot ==
The plot is based on eugenics. Madeline Francis (played by Gretchen Hartman) is just about to marry Robert Worthing (played by Milton Sills) when she learns that there is insanity in his family history (per the report of Worthing's mother, played by Marie Shotwell). Hence they cannot have children lest they surely pass on the madness to their spawn. Madeline begs for the marriage to take place to avoid shame, but she is treated like a sister rather than a bride. Madeline is left to contemplate suicide, but joy returns when Worthing finally learns he was adopted and that they can procreate without fear.

== Cast ==
- Gretchen Hartman as Madeline Francis
- Milton Sills as Robert Worthing
- Marie Shotwell as Mrs. Worthing
- Dora Mills Adams as Mrs. Francis

== Reception ==
Like many American films of the time, Married in Name Only was subject to restrictions and cuts by city and state film censorship boards. For example, the Chicago Board of Censors issued an Adults Only permit and cut, in Reel 5, a closeup of a couple embracing passionately in a bedroom.
