= Clifford S. Elfelt =

American film director (1892–1975)

Clifford Sanford Elfelt (Chicago, Illinois, December 13, 1892 – Los Angeles, California, September 3, 1975) was an American silent film director, writer and producer. He was active in the silent film industry from 1916 up to 1926, worked with Universal Studios, was head of Metropolitan Pictures Corporation of California and had his own Clifford S. Elfelt Productions company. He was married to the actress Gladys E. Fry (1903 - 1991, also known as June LaVere), who divorced him in 1923.

== Filmography ==
Melodrama A Great Love (1916) by Clifford S. Elfelt for Universal Big U. Intertitles in Dutch, running time 12:33. Collection EYE Film Institute Netherlands.

=== Director ===
- 1916 Muggins (Short)
- 1916 The Cry of Conscience (Short)
- 1916 The Eternal Way (Short)
- 1916 For Her Mother's Sake (Short)
- 1916 The Song of the Woods (Short)
- 1916 Little Brownie's Bravery (Short)
- 1916 Weapons of Love (Short)
- 1916 A Great Love (Short)
- 1922 Flaming Hearts
- 1922 Big Stakes
- 1923 Crimson Gold
- 1923 Danger
- 1924 $50,000 Reward
- 1925 Fighting Courage
- 1926 Under Fire
