= William G. Austin =

- Born: January 6, 1868; Galveston, Texas, U.S.
- Died: July 15, 1929 (aged 61); Palo Alto, California, U.S.
- Burial place: Cypress Lawn Cemetery; Palo Alto, California, U.S.
- Military career
- Allegiance: United States
- Branch: United States Army
- Service years: 1887–1892, 1898
- Rank: Colonel
- Units: E Troop, 7th U.S. Cavalry
- Commands: 302nd Stevedore Regiment
- Conflicts: Indian Wars; Spanish–American War
- Awards: Medal of Honor

William Grafton Austin (January 6, 1868 – July 15, 1929) was an American enlisted man and officer in the U.S. Army who served with the 7th Cavalry Regiment during the Indian Wars. Austin received the Medal of Honor for extraordinary gallantry at the Battle of Wounded Knee, but now called the Wounded Knee Massacre, on December 29, 1890.

== Biography ==
William Grafton Austin was born on January 6, 1868, in Grimes County or Galveston, Texas, to Mrs. George Grafton Austin and Charles W. Austin. His father served in the Confederate Navy. Austin enlisted in E Troop, 7th Cavalry Regiment of the U.S. Army in New York City on January 24, 1887; his age is recorded as 24 (birth year 1862 or 1863).

He participated in the Wounded Knee Massacre on December 29, 1890, and was awarded the Medal of Honor on June 17, 1891, for actions "while the Indians were concealed in a ravine, assisted men on the skirmish line, directing their fire, etc., and using every effort to dislodge the enemy".

He was discharged as a sergeant on January 23, 1892, at Fort Riley, Kansas.

After his discharge from the military, Austin returned to Savannah, Georgia where he was engaged in the Cotton business. He joined the Savannah Volunteer Guards in 1894 and rose in rank from private to captain of Company A, which unit he commanded in the Spanish–American War as part of the Second Georgia Regiment of Volunteers. Austin served as Chief of Police of Savannah and later owned and operated an automobile dealership.

During World War I, Austin was appointed as commander of the 302nd Stevedore Regiment. In 1919 Austin is listed as a colonel in the Officers' Reserve Corps in the quartermaster section in the State of California.

Austin married Francis. They had two daughters, Peggy and Hope. He retired to Palo Alto, California where he died on July 15, 1929. He was buried in Cypress Lawn Cemetery in Palo Alto.

== Medal of Honor citation ==
Rank and organization: Sergeant, Company E, 7th U.S. Cavalry. Place and date: At Wounded Knee Creek, S. Dak., December 29, 1890. Entered service at: New York, N.Y. Birth: Galveston, Tex. Date of issue: June 27, 1891.

Citation:

While the Indians were concealed in a ravine, assisted men on the skirmish line, directing their fire, etc., and using every effort to dislodge the enemy.

== See also ==
- List of Medal of Honor recipients
