= Shadows and Sunshine =

1916 film by Henry King

- Directed by: Henry King
- Produced by: E.D. Horkheimer; H.M. Horkheimer
- Starring: Marie Osborne; Leon Pardue; Lucy Payton
- Production company: Balboa Amusement Producing Company
- Distributed by: Pathé Exchange
- Release date: November 12, 1916
- Running time: 50 minutes
- Country: United States
- Languages: Silent; English intertitles

Shadows and Sunshine is a 1916 American silent drama film directed by Henry King and starring Marie Osborne, Leon Pardue, and Lucy Payton.

== Cast ==
- Marie Osborne as Little Mary
- Leon Pardue as Shadows
- Lucy Payton as Little Mary's Mother
- Daniel Gilfether as Gilbert Jackson
- Mollie McConnell as Amelia Jackson
- R. Henry Grey as Undetermined Role
- Henry King as Undetermined Role

== Bibliography ==
- Donald W. McCaffrey & Christopher P. Jacobs. Guide to the Silent Years of American Cinema. Greenwood Publishing, 1999. ISBN 0-313-30345-2
