= Sunshine and Gold =

- Directed by: Henry King
- Written by: Henry King; Will M. Ritchey
- Produced by: E.D. Horkheimer; H.M. Horkheimer
- Starring: Marie Osborne; Henry King; Daniel Gilfether
- Production company: Balboa Amusement Producing Company
- Distributed by: Pathé Exchange
- Release date: April 29, 1917
- Running time: 50 minutes
- Country: United States
- Languages: Silent; English intertitles

Sunshine and Gold is a 1917 American silent drama film directed by Henry King and starring Marie Osborne, Henry King, and Daniel Gilfether.

== Cast ==
- Marie Osborne as Little Mary
- Henry King as The Chauffeur
- Daniel Gilfether as James Andrews
- Neil Hardin as Dr. Andrews, His Son
- Arma Carlton

== Bibliography ==
- Donald W. McCaffrey & Christopher P. Jacobs. Guide to the Silent Years of American Cinema. Greenwood Publishing, 1999. ISBN 0-313-30345-2
