= Should a Wife Forgive? =

1915 film by Henry King

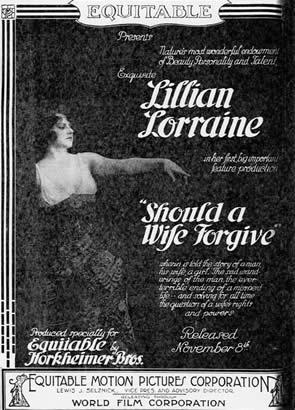
- Directed by: Henry King
- Written by: Joseph E. Howard
- Produced by: E.D. Horkheimer; H.M. Horkheimer
- Starring: Lillian Lorraine; Mabel Van Buren; Lew Cody
- Production company: Balboa Amusement Producing Company
- Distributed by: World Film
- Release date: November 8, 1915
- Running time: 50 minutes
- Country: United States
- Languages: Silent; English intertitles

Should a Wife Forgive? is a 1915 American silent drama film directed by Henry King and starring Lillian Lorraine, Mabel Van Buren, and Lew Cody.

== Cast ==
- Lillian Lorraine as La Belle Rose
- Mabel Van Buren as Mary Holmes
- Henry King as Jack Holmes
- Lew Cody as Alfred Bedford
- William Lampe as Dr. Charles Hoffman
- Mollie McConnell as Mrs. Forrester
- Fred Whitman as Reggy Stratford
- Daniel Gilfether as Henry Wilson
- Marie Osborne as Robert Holmes, baby

== Bibliography ==
- Donald W. McCaffrey & Christopher P. Jacobs. Guide to the Silent Years of American Cinema. Greenwood Publishing, 1999. ISBN 0-313-30345-2
