= Twin Kiddies =

1917 film by Henry King

- Directed by: Henry King
- Written by: Calder Johnstone
- Produced by: E.D. Horkheimer; H.M. Horkheimer
- Starring: Marie Osborne; Ruth Lackaye
- Cinematography: William Beckway
- Production company: Balboa Amusement Producing Company
- Distributed by: Pathé Exchange
- Release date: January 28, 1917
- Running time: 50 minutes
- Country: United States
- Languages: Silent; English intertitles

Twin Kiddies is a 1917 American silent comedy drama film directed by Henry King and starring Marie Osborne and Ruth Lackaye. King himself appears in a leading role.

== Cast ==
- Marie Osborne as Bessie Hunt / Fay Van Loan
- Henry King as Jasper Hunt
- Ruth Lackaye as Mrs. Flannigan
- Daniel Gilfether as William Van Loan
- R. Henry Grey as Baxter Van Loan
- Loretta Beecker as Beatrice Van Loan
- Edward Jobson as Spencer
- Mignon Le Brun as The Governess

== Bibliography ==
- Donald W. McCaffrey & Christopher P. Jacobs. Guide to the Silent Years of American Cinema. Greenwood Publishing, 1999. ISBN 0-313-30345-2
