= Told at Twilight =

1917 film by Henry King

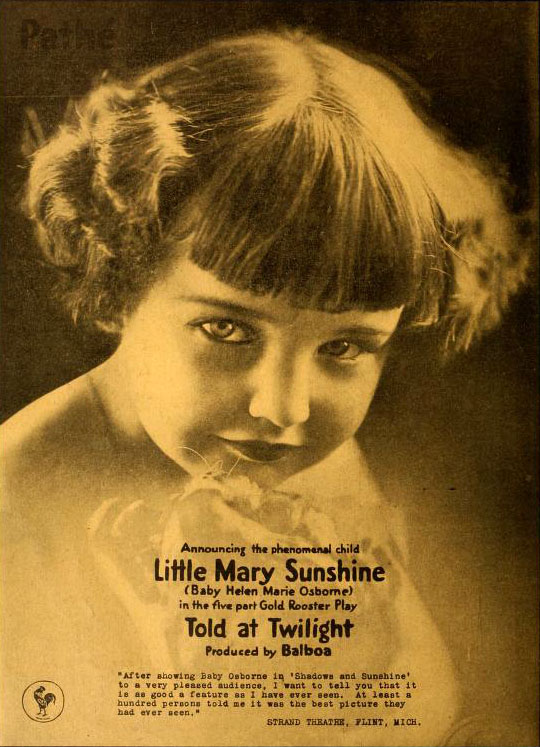
- Directed by: Henry King
- Written by: Daniel F. Whitcomb
- Produced by: E.D. Horkheimer; H.M. Horkheimer
- Starring: Marie Osborne; Daniel Gilfether; Beatrice Van
- Cinematography: William Beckway
- Production company: Balboa Amusement Producing Company
- Distributed by: Pathé Exchange
- Release date: March 25, 1917
- Running time: 50 minutes
- Country: United States
- Languages: Silent; English intertitles

Told at Twilight is a 1917 American silent drama film directed by Henry King and starring Marie Osborne, Daniel Gilfether, and Beatrice Van.

== Cast ==
- Marie Osborne as Little Mary Sunshine
- Daniel Gilfether as Daniel Graham
- Beatrice Van as The Mother
- Henry King as The Father
- Leon Pardue as Piggy

== Bibliography ==
- Donald W. McCaffrey & Christopher P. Jacobs. Guide to the Silent Years of American Cinema. Greenwood Publishing, 1999. ISBN 0-313-30345-2
