= Joy and the Dragon =

1916 film by Henry King

- Directed by: Henry King
- Written by: Bill Ritchley
- Produced by: Balboa Amusement Producing Company; E. D. Horkheimer; H. M. Horkheimer
- Starring: Marie Osborne
- Cinematography: William Beckway; George Rizard
- Distributed by: Pathé Exchange
- Release date: December 31, 1916
- Running time: 5 reels or about 50 minutes
- Country: USA
- Language: Silent..English intertitles

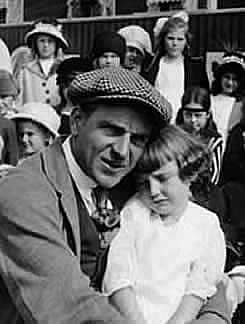
Henry King and Marie Osborne

Joy and the Dragon is a surviving 1916 silent film directed by Henry King and starring himself and 'Baby' Marie Osborne. It was produced at the Balboa Amusement Producing Company and distributed by the Pathé Exchange.

Copies survive in London (BFI) and Valencia, Spain (Instituto Valenciano De Cinematografia).

== Cast ==
- 'Baby' Marie Osborne - Joy
- Henry King - Hal Lewis
- Mollie McConnell - The Matron
- Cullen Landis - Slinky Joe (L. Cullen Landis)

== Synopsis ==
From the Descriptive Catalogue of Pathéscope Films:

On the blue waves floats the remainder of a wrecked ship. On the wreck is little Mary who is now an orphan, both her parents having been drowned when the ship went down. Mary is taken to an orphan asylum; there she has all sorts of troubles and runs away. While everybody thinks she was drowned, she simply is on a locomotive, heading West. She finds herself in a Western small town grocery store, at the time a man draws a revolver to shoot another; she disarms the assailant. The attacked man happens to be James Lewis, the son of a rich Easterner; he came West after reverses and gambling adventures, to reform. Mary's intervention so strongly impressed the stranger that he adopts the child. The would-be assassin, not satisfied to let Lewis escape, plans a new plot to kill him with a bomb. The little girl discovers the bomb and explodes it, again saving her benefactor from certain death. James is so affected by this that he sells the claim and returns to his former life with the idea of making little Mary happy forever.
