= Pay Dirt =

1916 film by Henry King

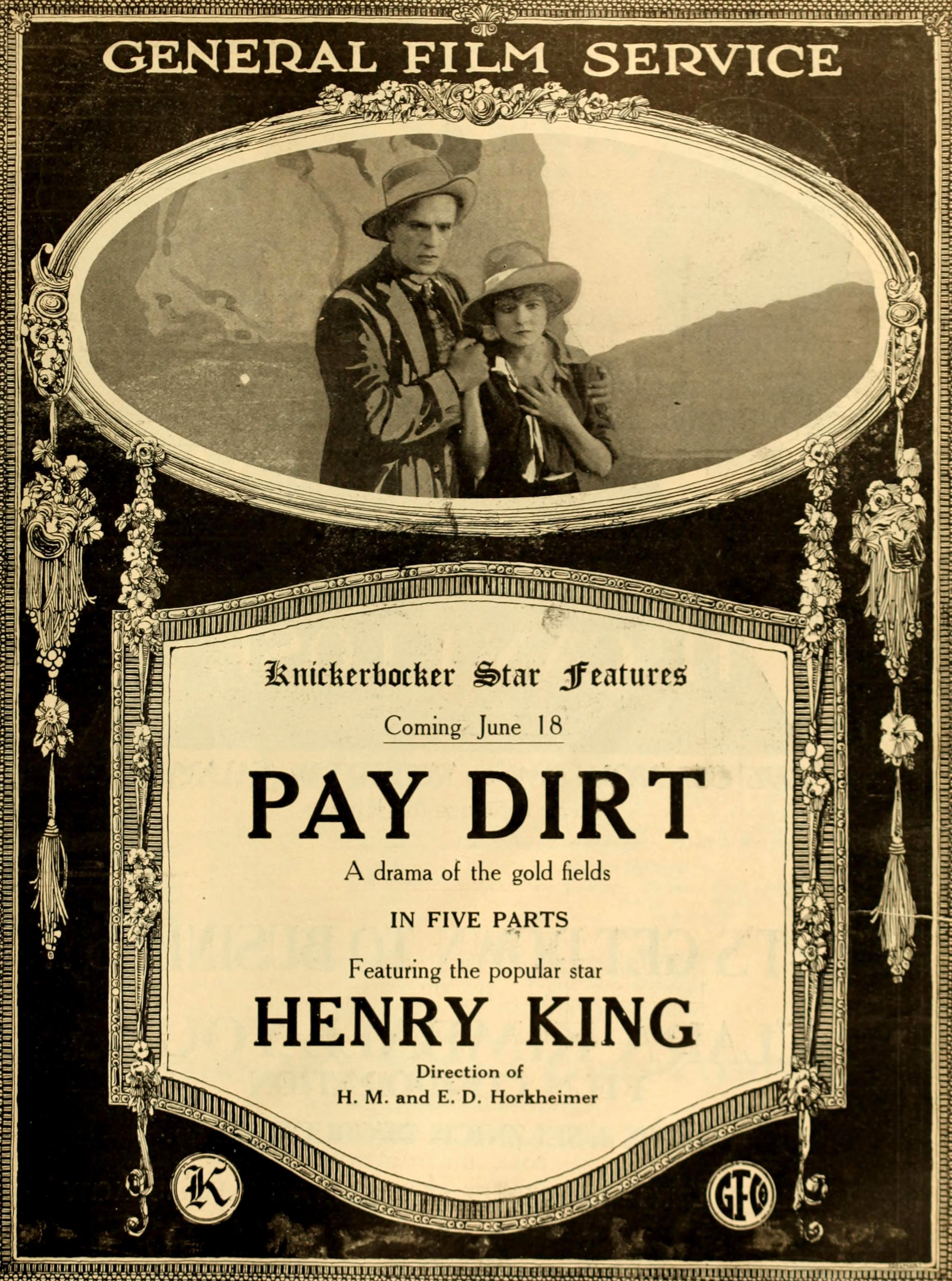
- Advertising for Pay Dirt on the Moving Picture World (June 1916)
- Directed by: Henry King
- Produced by: E.D. Horkheimer; H.M. Horkheimer
- Starring: Henry King; Marguerite Nichols; Gordon Sackville; Mollie McConnell; Daniel Gilfether; Charles Dudley
- Production company: Balboa Amusement Producing Company
- Distributed by: General Film Company
- Release date: June 18, 1916
- Running time: 50 minutes
- Country: United States
- Languages: Silent film (English intertitles)

Pay Dirt is a 1916 American silent drama film directed by Henry King and starring himself, Marguerite Nichols, Gordon Sackville, Mollie McConnell, Daniel Gilfether, and Charles Dudley. The film was released by General Film Company on June 18, 1916.

King said it was the last film he made for Balboa/Pathe.

== Plot ==
A young miner known as "The Easterner" struggles with a gambling habit despite the efforts of Moll, a camp woman who turns out to be his mother. He becomes romantically involved with Kate Gardner, who learns that her father and a gambler are plotting to steal the Easterner's mining claim. After a series of dramatic events, including a fight where Kate's father is revealed as a thief, Kate discovers that a half-wit named Oby is her real father. In the end, Kate marries the Easterner.

== Cast ==
- Henry King as The Easterner
- Marguerite Nichols as Kate Gardner
- Gordon Sackville as Peter Gardner
- Mollie McConnell as Moll
- Daniel Gilfether as Dick Weed
- Charles Dudley as Oby
- Philo McCullough as Turner
- Ruth White as Doris Wendell
- Bruce Smith as Doris's Father

== Preservation ==
A print of the film survives at the Library of Congress.
