= Frank Erlanger =

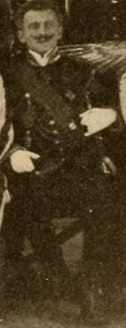
- Frank Erlanger at the 1916 Balboa Annual Ball, in costume as Victor Emmanuel III of Italy
- Born: March 25, 1882; Austria-Hungary
- Died: 1961 (aged 78–79)
- Occupation: Actor

Frank Erlanger (March 25, 1882 – 1961), also credited as Frank A. Erlanger or Frank Charles Erlanger was a Hungarian-American silent film actor best known for his work with the Balboa Amusement Producing Company.

== Early life ==
The Erlangers were a well-established Hungarian family living in what was then Austria-Hungary. Frank's father, Ottmar, was a colonel in the 7th Regiment of the Imperial and Royal Hussars. His mother, Theresia de Retsky, was an actress. The family originally resided in Budapest but relocated to Vienna before or after Frank's birth. While Frank's family, including sister Elizabeth, remained there, he was sent to Prague for schooling. After six years at the Mozart Dramatic College, he joined the military, rising to the rank of lieutenant in the 7th Hussars.

Acceding to his mother's wishes, he resigned from the military to become an actor. He joined her on the stage for performances in several European cities, before moving to Milan, where he received additional study in music and drama at the Academy of Music before returning to the stage for four years in Germany.

== Film career ==
Erlanger took an interest in the film industry, and left the stage to spend four years with a German film company, the Kinematographic Kunst Company. He interrupted his acting career to travel to South America as part of a gold prospecting expedition. His placer mining there was financially successful, earning him $60,000, the equivalent of over $1,500,000 in present-day terms. However, he lost that money over the next two years in unsuccessful prospecting efforts in California and subsequently returned to film. Erlanger worked for many of the studios of the silent film era, including Universal, Kinemacolor, Essanay, Majestic, and the California Motion Picture Corporation, but he received his greatest fame with the Balboa Amusement Producing Company.

== Partial filmography ==
- Salomy Jane (1914) (stunt performer)
- Sacrificial Fires (1914)
- St.Elmo (1914)
- The Sands of Life (1914)
- Spellbound (1916)
- The Power of Evil (1916)
- The Sultana (1916)
- The Yellow Bullet (1917)
- The Climber (1917)

== Bibliography ==
- Jura, Jean-Jacques; Bardin, Rodney Norman (2007). Balboa Films: A History and Filmography of the Silent Film Studio. McFarland. ISBN 978-0-7864-3098-7.
