= Little Mary Sunshine (1916 film) =

1916 film by Henry King

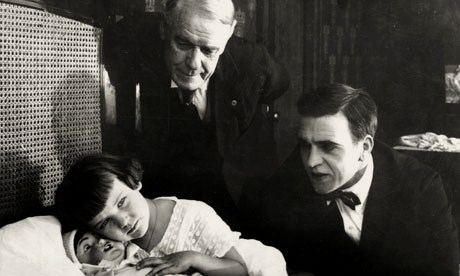
- Marie Osborne, Daniel Gilfeather & Henry King
- Directed by: Henry King; Alden Willey (assistant director)
- Written by: Daniel F. Whitcomb (as DF Whitcomb)
- Produced by: E. D. Horkheimer and H. M. Horkheimer
- Starring: Baby Marie Osborne
- Production company: Balboa Amusement Producing Company
- Distributed by: Pathé Exchange
- Release date: 1916
- Running time: 46 minutes
- Country: United States
- Language: English

Little Mary Sunshine is a 1916 silent movie directed by Henry King.

== Plot ==
Abandoned by her drunken father after he beats her mother to death, 5-year-old Mary finds refuge in a car where she falls asleep. The car belongs to Bob Daley, a young man who has made the mistake of celebrating his engagement by getting drunk with his friends and then lying about it to Sylvia, his fiancée. Sylvia does not approve of his conduct and throws him out of the house, breaking up with him.

Despondent, Bob staggers to his car where he finds the sleeping child. The two become friends and Bob brings the little girl to his house. Moved by her tragic story, Bob decides to quit drinking and become a serious and responsible parent. Sylvia, affected by the change, is reconciled with her boyfriend, and the couple decide that once they are married, they will adopt little Mary.

== Cast ==
- Baby Marie Osborne as Mary
- Henry King as Bob Daley
- Marguerite Nichols as Sylvia Sanford
- Andrew Arbuckle as Bob's father
- Mollie McConnell as Sylvia's mother

== Production ==
The film was produced by Balboa Amusement Producing Company. It was shot in Long Beach, California.

== Distribution ==
Distributed by Pathé Exchange, the film was released in US cinemas on March 3, 1916. A copy of the film—35mm color-toned nitrate positive with French intertitles—is preserved in a French archive. The film has been remastered and was released on November 22, 2004 by Unknown Video in a Dolby Digital 2.0 mono which also included the 1917 film version of Tom Sawyer. The two silent movies, subtitled in English, feature music by electric organist Bob Vaughn.

King said the film was the idea of Dan Whitcomb's. King claimed the movie "turned out to be a smashing hit. It also was the first full-length picture that I ever directed. The Horkheimers were glad to let me direct. Since they couldn't pay me, they figured a good way to keep me quiet was to keep me busy."

== Bibliography ==
- The American Film Institute Catalog, Features Films 1911-1920, University of California Press, 1988. ISBN 0-520-06301-5
- Henry King Director - From Silent to 'Scope, Directors Guild of America Publication, 1995. ISBN 1-882766-03-2 pp. 21–24
