= When a Man Rides Alone (1919 film) =

1919 film

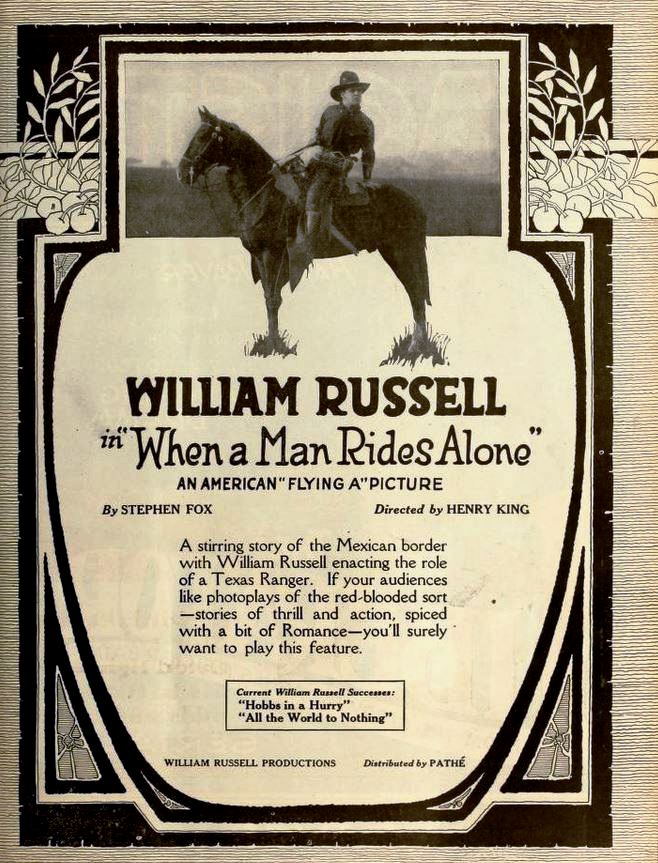
- Directed by: Henry King
- Starring: William Russell
- Distributed by: Pathé Exchange
- Release date: 1919
- Country: United States
- Languages: Silent; English intertitles

When a Man Rides Alone is a 1919 silent film directed by Henry King and starring William Russell as a Texas Ranger near the Mexican border. Jules Furthman, using the name Stephen Fox, was the screenwriter. Cast members include Carl Stockdale, Olga Grey, and Lule Warrenton.

== Gallery ==
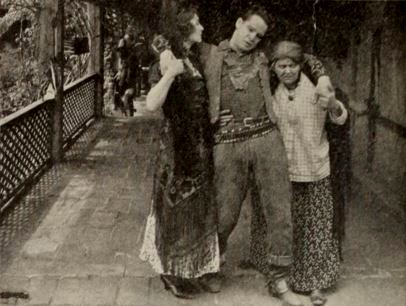
Still for the Exhibitors Herald showing a scene with Olga Grey, William Russell, and Lule Warrenton

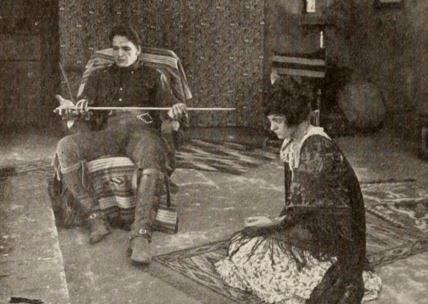
Still from the Exhibitors Herald showing a scene with William Russell and Olga Grey
