= Henry King (director) =

American film director

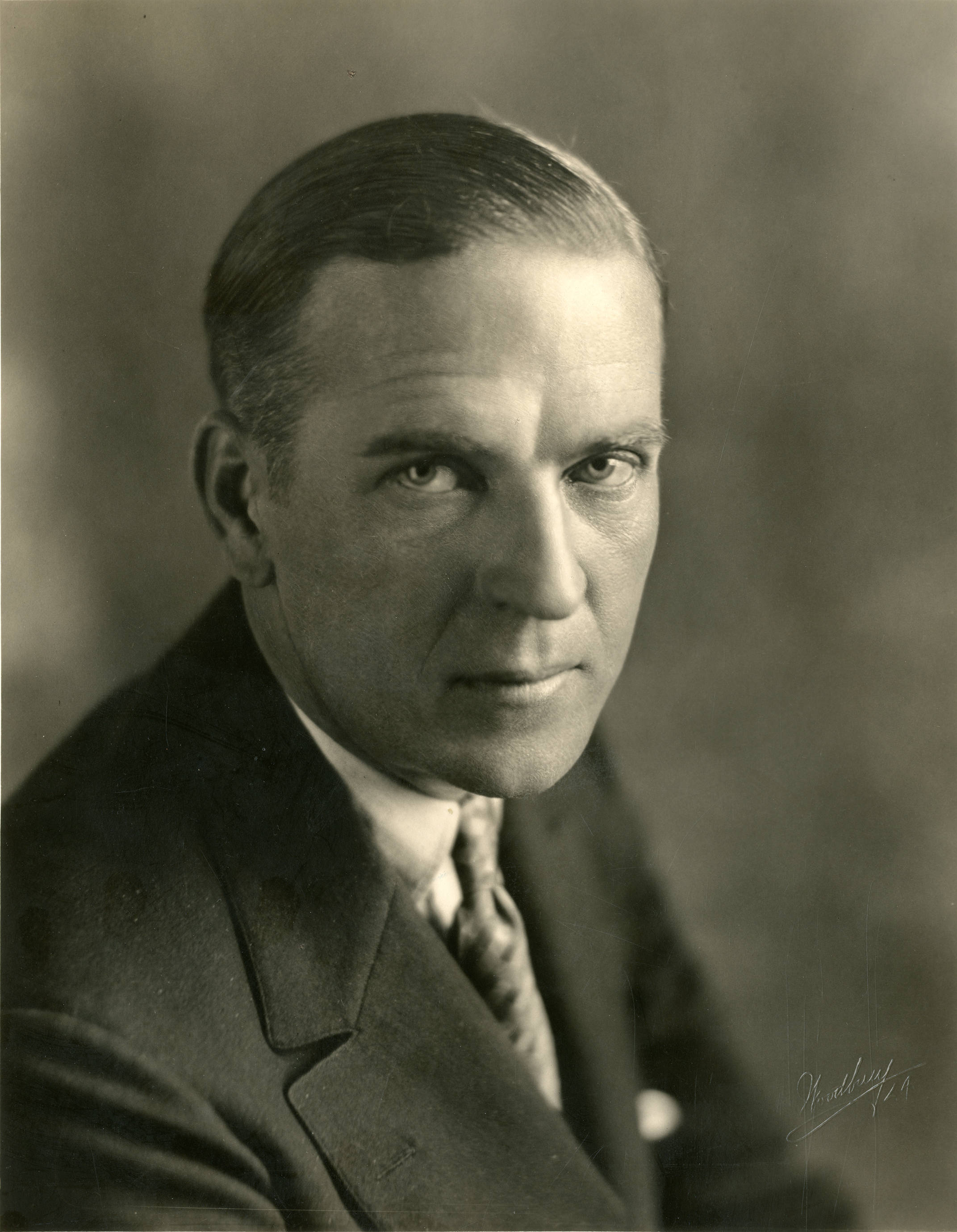
- Born: January 24, 1886; Christiansburg, Virginia, U.S.
- Died: June 29, 1982 (aged 96); Toluca Lake, California, U.S.
- Occupations: Actor, film director
- Spouses: Gypsy Abbott (m. 1915; died 1952) Ida (m. 1959) (died 2001)
- Children: 3
- Relatives: Louis King (brother)

Henry King (January 24, 1886 – June 29, 1982) was an American actor and film director. Widely considered one of the finest and most successful filmmakers of his era, King was nominated for two Academy Awards for Best Director and directed seven films nominated for the Academy Award for Best Picture.

Before coming to film, King worked as an actor in various repertoire theatres and first started to take small film roles in 1912. Between 1913 and 1925, he appeared as an actor in approximately sixty films. He directed for the first time in 1915 and grew to become one of the most commercially successful Hollywood directors of the 1920s and '30s. He was twice nominated for the Best Director Oscar. In 1944, he was awarded the first Golden Globe Award for Best Director for his film The Song of Bernadette. He worked most often with Tyrone Power and Gregory Peck and for 20th Century Fox.

Henry King was one of the 36 founders of the Academy of Motion Picture Arts and Sciences, which awards excellence of cinematic achievements every year, and was the last surviving founder. He directed more than 100 films in his career. In 1955, King was awarded The George Eastman Award, given by the George Eastman House for distinguished contribution to the art of film.

== Biography ==
King was born on his family's farm near Christianburg, Virginia at Parkdale Collegiate Institute. When he was young they moved to Lafayette. King started studying engineering but he had become interested in theatre at school and decided to become an actor. He joined a stock company in Roanoke, the Empire Stock Company, and began to tour the country doing plays.King later joined the Osmond Star Company, the Commonwealth Company, and the Jolly American Tramp Show. He also began directing theatre.

King began appearing in films in 1912, initially for the Lubin Manufacturing Company on the West Coast on $35 a week. He was with them for three months. King began writing screenplays and directing the occasional pick up shot for Lubin.

=== Balboa ===
King accepted an offer to work for the Balboa Amusement Producing Company (later the Balboa Feature Film Company) in Long Beach as an actor $75 a week. While there he also wrote and direct. He sold an original story The Brand of Man. King's directing of a fight sequence for another film impressed Balboa so they gave him the chance to direct it, as his debut.

King directed the first episode of a series Who Plays?; he did not direct the rest but appeared in it as an actor. He said he was paid $75 a week as an actor and was offered an additional $25 a week to direct. He directed Should a Wife Forgive? (1916) with Lillian Lorraine and his was followed by When Might Is Right (1916), The Oath of Hate (1916), Pay Dirt (1916), and Faith's Reward (1916). King recalled:

The Balboa Company made pictures to be sold by the foot... [they] would shoot a great quantity of footage with some semblance of story in it and then tie it together with subtitles. They had no money; they would sell the negative at a dollar a foot and come back with a hundred thousand dollars, pay off their debts and start all over again...Every time they came back from New York they'd have a new girl, who would be my leading lady. I got a little tired of being presented with a new leading lady for every picture.

King discovered Baby Marie Osborne at the studio lunchroom and helped construct a vehicle for her, Little Mary Sunshine (1916). This made her a star. Other films King directed with Baby Marie (most of which were written by Dan Whitcomb) included Shadows and Sunshine (1916) with Baby Marie, Joy and the Dragon (1916), Twin Kiddies (1917), Told at Twilight (1917), Vengeance of the Dead (1917), and Sunshine and Gold (1917). He also starred and directed The Climber (1917) and The Locked Heart (1918).

=== American Film Company ===
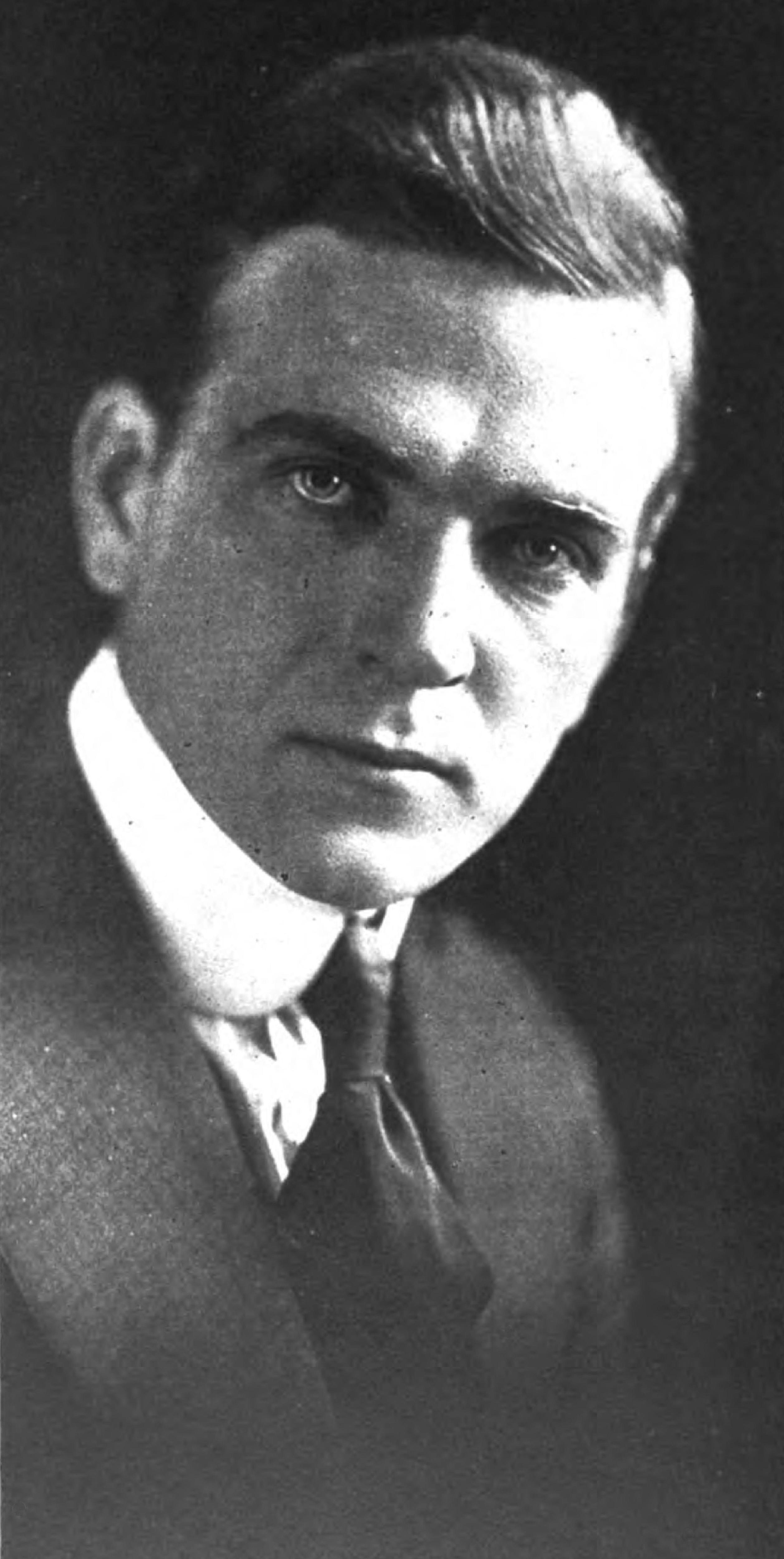
Henry King in 1915

King moved over to the American Film company who had offered him $350 a week. His first film for the company was a war movie Souls in Pawn (1917), written by Jules Furthman.

King followed it with The Bride's Silence (1917), Southern Pride (1917), A Game of Wits (1917), The Mate of the Sally Ann (1917). King directed some films with Mary Miles Minter: Powers That Prey (1918), Social Briars (1918), and Beauty and the Rogue (1918).

He made a series of films starring William Russell written by Jules Furthman: Hearts or Diamonds? (1918), Up Romance Road (1918), Hobbs in a Hurry (1918), All the World to Nothing (1918), When a Man Rides Alone (1919), Where the West Begins (1919), Brass Buttons (1919), Some Liar (1919), A Sporting Chance (1919), This Hero Stuff (1919), and Six Feet Four (1919).

=== Other Studios ===
King directed 23 1/2 Hours' Leave (1919) for Thomas Ince starring Douglas MacLean. After this King left for the Robertson-Cole Company. He did some films with HB Warner: A Fugitive from Matrimony (1919), Haunting Shadows (1919), The White Dove (1920), Uncharted Channels (1920), One Hour Before Dawn (1920), Dice of Destiny (1920), and When We Were 21 (1921). He starred in and directed Help Wanted - Male (1920) with Blanche Sweet - this was the last film King ever acted in.

King directed Pauline Frederick in The Mistress of Shenstone (1921), Salvage (1921), and The Sting of the Lash (1921). King joined his own company, Inspiration Pictures with Charlie Duell.

=== Tol'able David ===
King had a huge critical and commercial success with Tol'able David (1921), financed by First National. It starred Richard Barthemless who reunited with King in The Seventh Day (1922), Sonny (1922), The Bond Boy (1922), and Fury (1923). T

King made The White Sister (1923) with Lillian Gish and Ronald Colman. It was shot in Italy and was very successful, launching Colman as a movie star. He, Gish and King were reunited with Romola (1923).

He made some films with Alice Terry for Paramount, Sackcloth and Scarlet (1925) and Any Woman (1925).

Working for Sam Goldwyn, King had a huge success with Stella Dallas (1925) with Coleman, Partners Again (1926), and some films with Colman and Vilma Bánky: The Winning of Barbara Worth (1926) and The Magic Flame (1927). He did The Woman Disputed (1927) for Norman Schenck and She Goes to War (1929) for Inspiration. These were part-sound movies.

King made Hell Harbor (1930) and The Eyes of the World (1930) for Inspiration.

=== Fox ===
King joined Fox Studios. He made Lightnin' (1930) with Will Rogers, Merely Mary Ann (1931) with Janet Gaynor and Charles Farrell, Over the Hill (1931), and The Woman in Room 13 (1932). King had a huge hit with State Fair (1933) starring Rogers and Gaynor.

He was one of several directors on I Loved You Wednesday (1933) and My Lips Betray (1933) and made Carolina (1934) with Gaynor and Marie Galante (193) with Spencer Tracy. King directed One More Spring (1935) with Gaynor.

=== 20th Century Fox ===
King stayed with Fox when it merged with 20th Century. His films included Way Down East (1935) (which he said "fell far short" of the original) and The Country Doctor (1936). Ramona (1936), shot in Technicolor, starred Loretta Young and was an early lead role for Don Ameche, while Lloyd's of London (1936) made a star of Tyrone Power.

A remake of Seventh Heaven (1937) was not that successful but In Old Chicago (1938), with Power, Don Ameche and Alice Faye was a big hit. Alexander's Ragtime Band (1938), which reunited King with Power, Ameche and Faye, became the biggest hit in the studio's history. Jesse James (1939) with Power and Henry Fonda was one of the most popular movies of the year.

King directed Stanley and Livingstone (1939) with Tracy, Little Old New York (1940) with Faye, Maryland (1940) with Walter Brennan and Chad Hanna (1940) with Dorothy Lamour and Fonda. None of these films were particularly popular but A Yank in the RAF (1941) with Power and Betty Grable was a huge hit.

King directed Remember the Day (1942), a drama with Claudette Colbert and John Payne, and The Black Swan (1942), a massively popular swashbuckler wih Power. Another big hit was The Song of Bernadette (1943) which made a star of Jennifer Jones and earned King a Best Director Oscar nomination.

King was entrusted Wilson (1944), a dream project of Daryl F. Zanuck, which was the most expensive film produced by Fox to date, but which was a box office disappointment. King directed A Bell for Adano (1945) with Gene Tierney, then Margie (1946) with Jeanne Crain, which was a "sleeper" box office success.

King made two epic historical films with Power, Captain from Castile (1947) and Prince of Foxes (1949). In between he did Deep Waters (1948) with Dana Andrews and Jean Peters.

King made two acclaimed films with Gregory Peck, Twelve O'Clock High (1949) and The Gunfighter (1950). The former was very popular but not the latter, which Zanuck attributed to Peck wearing a moustache.

This was followed by I'd Climb the Highest Mountain (1951) with Susan Hayward and the popular David and Bathsheba (1951), a Biblical epic with Hayward and Peck.

King directed Wait Till the Sun Shines, Nellie (1952) with Jean Peters, an episode of O. Henry's Full House (1952) with Crain, then The Snows of Kilimanjaro (1952), based on the short story by Ernest Hemingway, with Peck, Hayward and Ava Garner, which was one of the most popular movies of the decade.

King made two historical films with Power, King of the Khyber Rifles (1954) and Untamed (1955), the latter co-starring Hayward. Then he made the popular Love Is a Many-Splendored Thing (1955) with Jones and William Holden.

After the musical Carousel (1956), King directed another Hemingway adaptation, The Sun Also Rises (1957) with Power and Gardner. Despite being personally produced by Zanuck, the film was a commercial and critical disappointment.

More acclaimed was the Greg Peck Western The Bravados (1958). King went to Universal to direct This Earth Is Mine (1959) with Rock Hudson and Jean Simmons. He returned to Fox for his last two films Beloved Infidel (1959) with Peck and Deborah Kerr and Tender Is the Night (1962) with Jones.

== Personal life ==
During World War II, King served as the deputy commander of the Civil Air Patrol coastal patrol base in Brownsville, Texas, holding the rank of captain. (In his final years, he was the oldest licensed private pilot in the United States, having obtained his license in 1918.)

In 1924, he converted to Catholicism.

Henry King was married twice, first to Gyspy Abbott, who was an actor at Balboa Company. They married in 1915 and had three children, Frank, John and Martha.

His second wife was Ida Davis, to whom he remained married until his death on June 29, 1982. He died at home in his sleep of a heart attack at the age of 96. He was interred with his second wife Ida Davis in the Davis King family plot at Myrtle Hill Cemetery in Tampa, Florida.

== Partial filmography ==
=== Director ===
- Should a Wife Forgive? (1915)
- Little Mary Sunshine (1916)
- Pay Dirt (1916)
- Shadows and Sunshine (1916)
- The Mate of the Sally Ann (1917)
- Twin Kiddies (1917)
- Beauty and the Rogue (1917)
- Sunshine and Gold (1917)
- A Game of Wits (1917)
- Told at Twilight (1917)
- The Bride's Silence (1917)
- Southern Pride (1917)
- Powers That Prey (1918)
- Up Romance Road (1918)
- Hobbs in a Hurry (1918)
- Hearts or Diamonds? (1918)
- Social Briars (1918)
- The Locked Heart (1918)
- All the World to Nothing (1918)
- Where the West Begins (1919)
- Brass Buttons (1919)
- This Hero Stuff (1919)
- A Fugitive from Matrimony (1919)
- Six Feet Four (1919)
- Some Liar (1919)
- A Sporting Chance (1919
- Haunting Shadows (1919)
- One Hour Before Dawn (1920)
- Dice of Destiny (1920)
- The White Dove (1920)
- Uncharted Channels (1920)
- Help Wanted - Male (1920)
- When We Were 21 (1921)
- The Sting of the Lash (1921)
- Salvage (1921)
- Tol'able David (1921)
- Sonny (1922)
- The Seventh Day (1922)
- Fury (1923)
- The Bond Boy (1923)
- The White Sister (1923)
- Romola (1924)
- Stella Dallas (1925)
- The Winning of Barbara Worth (1926)
- Partners Again (1926)
- The Magic Flame (1927)
- The Woman Disputed (1928)
- She Goes to War (1929)
- Hell Harbor (1930)
- The Eyes of the World (1930)
- Lightnin' (1930)
- Merely Mary Ann (1931)
- Over the Hill (1931)
- The Woman in Room 13 (1932)
- State Fair (1933)
- I Loved You Wednesday (1933)
- Marie Galante (1934)
- One More Spring (1935)
- Way Down East (1935)
- The Country Doctor (1936)
- Ramona (1936)
- Lloyd's of London (1936)
- Seventh Heaven (1937)
- In Old Chicago (1937)
- Alexander's Ragtime Band (1938)
- Jesse James (1939)
- Stanley and Livingstone (1939)
- Little Old New York (1940)
- Maryland (1940)
- Chad Hanna 1940)
- A Yank in the RAF (1941)
- Remember the Day (1941)
- The Black Swan (1942)
- The Song of Bernadette (1943)
- Wilson (1944)
- A Bell for Adano (1945)
- Margie (1946)
- Captain from Castile (1947)
- Deep Waters (1948)
- Prince of Foxes (1949)
- Twelve O'Clock High (1949)
- The Gunfighter (1950)
- I'd Climb the Highest Mountain (1951)
- David and Bathsheba (1951)
- O. Henry's Full House (1952)
- The Snows of Kilimanjaro (1952)
- Wait till the Sun Shines, Nellie (1952)
- King of the Khyber Rifles (1953)
- Untamed (1955)
- Love Is a Many-Splendored Thing (1955)
- Carousel (1956)
- The Sun Also Rises (1957)
- The Bravados (1958)
- This Earth Is Mine (1959)
- Beloved Infidel (1959)
- Tender Is the Night (1962)

=== Actor ===
- Who Pays? (1915)
- Should a Wife Forgive? (1915) - Jack Holmes
- Little Mary Sunshine (1916) - Bob Daley
- Pay Dirt (1916) - The Easterner
- The Power of Evil (1916) - Stuart Merwin
- Shadows and Sunshine (1916) - Minor Role (uncredited)
- Joy and the Dragon (1916) - Hal Lewis
- Twin Kiddies (1917) - Jasper Hunt
- In the Hands of the Law (1917)
- The Devil's Bait (1917)
- Told at Twilight (1917) - The Father
- Sunshine and Gold (1917) - The Chauffeur
- Hearts or Diamonds? (1918)
- The Locked Heart (1918) - Harry Mason
- Help Wanted - Male (1920) - Tubbs
- Ben-Hur: A Tale of the Christ (1925) - Chariot Race Spectator (uncredited) (final film role)

== Academy Awards ==
Year	Award	Film	Result
1943	Best Director	The Song of Bernadette	Nominated
1944	Best Director	Wilson	Nominated

== Notes ==
- King, Henry (1995). Henry King, director : from silents to ʼscope. Directors Guild of America.
