= Bab the Fixer =

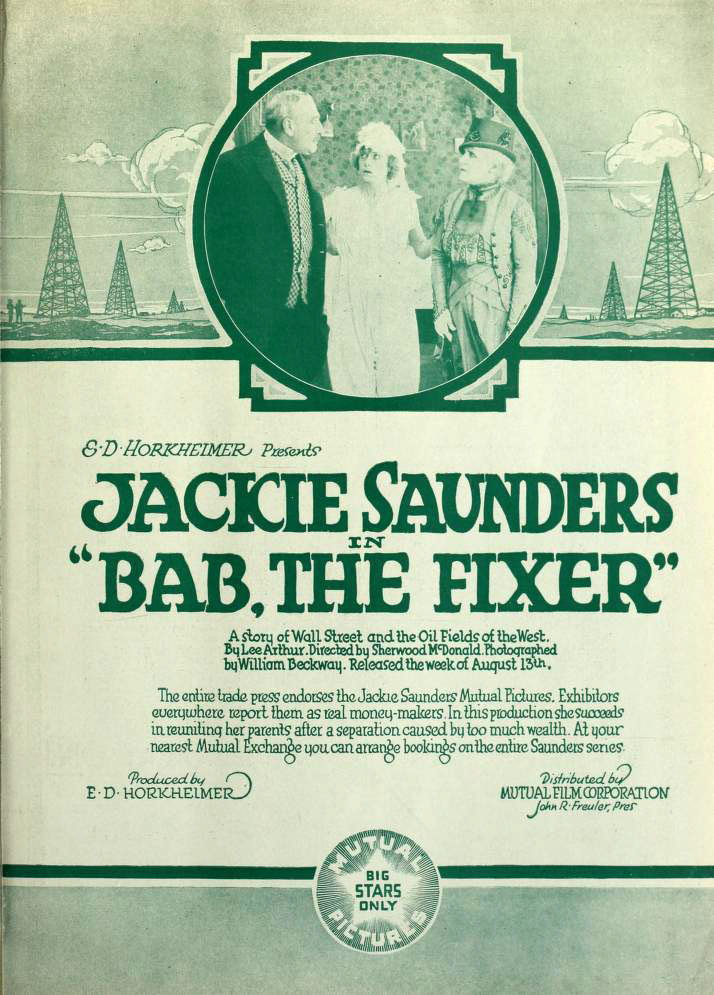
- Directed by: Sherwood MacDonald
- Written by: Lee Arthur (screen story); Lee Arthur (scenario); Jackie Saunders (scenario)
- Produced by: E. D. Horkheimer; H. M. Horkheimer
- Starring: Jackie Saunders
- Cinematography: William Beckway
- Production company: Balboa Amusement Producing Company
- Distributed by: Mutual Film
- Release date: August 13, 1917
- Running time: 5 reels
- Country: United States
- Language: Silent (English intertitles)

Bab the Fixer is a 1917 American silent comedy-drama film produced by E. D. Horkheimer and distributed by Mutual Film. Sherwood MacDonald directed and Jackie Saunders (wife of producer Horkheimer), who co-wrote the screenplay, stars. The film is lost.

This film is not related to the series of 'Babs' films starring Marguerite Clark released by Paramount later that year.

== Plot ==
Bab Porter is a young girl who moves west with her family after her stockbroker father John Porter loses their money through bad stock investments. After 10 years of living on the Ranch, Bab has all the characteristics of a cowgirl. Bab falls in love with Richard Sterling, a former clerk and self-made man. Bab’s mother does not approve of the match and wishes her daughter to marry up in social status. After the Porter family discovers oil on their ranch, Bab’s mother sends her to finishing school back east to assist her in landing a suitable husband.

When Bab returns from school, she learns her mother and father have separated. Bab then works as a “fixer” for her parents’ marriage. The movie ends with her own wedding to Richard, the man she loved all along.

== Cast ==
- Jackie Saunders as Bab
- Leslie T. Peacocke as John Porter
- Mollie McConnell as Adelaide Porter
- Ruth Lackaye as Mrs. Drexel
- R. Henry Grey as LeRoy Scott
- Arthur Shirley as Richard Sterling

== Reception ==
Like many American films of the time, Bab the Fixer was subject to cuts by city and state film censorship boards. The Chicago Board of Censors ordered cut a scene showing a girl at a table thumbing her nose.

The Kansas Board of Review required the removal of a scene where college girls pray during a card game.
