= All the World to Nothing =

1918 film

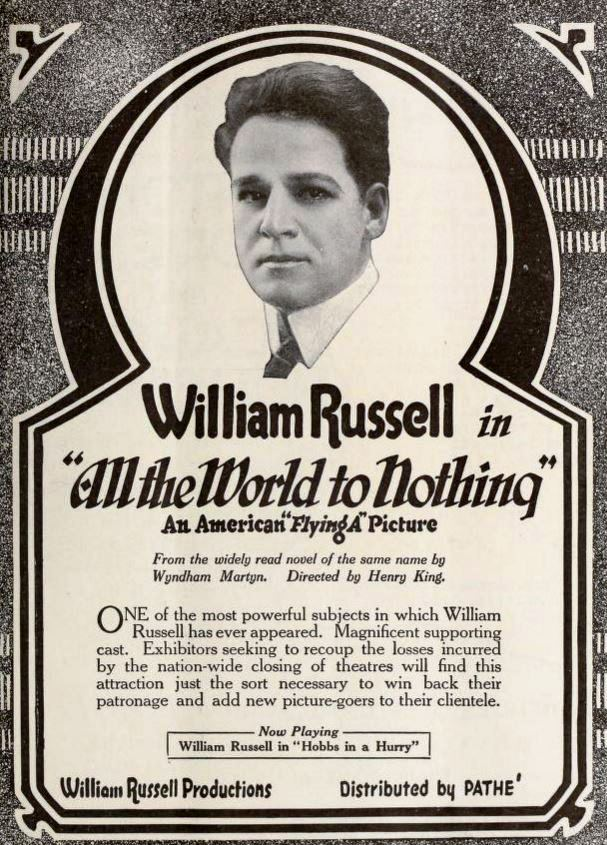
- Promotional poster
- Directed by: Henry King
- Written by: Jules Furthman
- Based on: All the World to Nothing by Wyndham Martyn
- Starring: William Russell; Winifred Westover; J. Morris Foster
- Production company: American Film Company
- Distributed by: Pathé Exchange
- Release date: December 1, 1918
- Running time: 50 minutes
- Country: United States
- Language: Silent (English intertitles)

All the World to Nothing is a lost 1918 American silent comedy-drama film directed by Henry King and starring William Russell, Winifred Westover, and J. Morris Foster. As noted in an advertisement, it was based on the novel of the same name by Wyndham Martyn.

== Plot ==
According to Exhibitors Herald, "Richard Chester, a young millionaire, who gambles away his fortune and has to go to work at anything he can get, starting as a book agent.

Meanwhile he has walked into a strange adventure, as the result of which he has been married to Miss Ellis, an attractive heiress, who was compelled to wed the first man she could get, to meet the terms of her grandfather's will.

The paths of Chester and Miss Ellis subsequently cross and the two fall deeply in love with each other. Miss Ellis does not recognize Chester as he had been in disguise the night he wed her.

Chester has a hard time making his own way, being the victim of hard luck. Finally when his pal is killed he is compelled to ask Miss Ellis for aid. At the same time he determines to say good-bye, but learns that Rennals, a wealthy rival, is planning to ruin Miss Ellis financially by a big raid on Brazilian lead.

Chester, with a knowledge of brokerage, determines to save Miss Ellis' fortune and does so in a startling manner through the aid of former friends, at the same time making a fortune both for Miss Ellis and himself. Then he reveals that he is the man she wed and the story ends happily."

== Cast ==
- William Russell as Richard Chester
- Winifred Westover as Nora Ellis
- J. Morris Foster as Everard Peck
- Hayward Mack as Charles Renalls

== Preservation ==
With no holdings located in archives, All the World to Nothing is considered a lost film.

== Bibliography ==
- Donald W. McCaffrey & Christopher P. Jacobs. Guide to the Silent Years of American Cinema. Greenwood Publishing, 1999. ISBN 0-313-30345-2
