= Before Midnight (1925 film) =

1925 film

- Directed by: John G. Adolfi
- Written by: Jules Furthman
- Produced by: Henry Ginsberg
- Starring: William Russell; Barbara Bedford; Brinsley Shaw
- Cinematography: Dewey Wrigley
- Production company: Royal Productions
- Distributed by: Henry Ginsberg Distributing Company; Wardour Films (UK)
- Release date: August 21, 1925
- Running time: 50 minutes
- Country: United States
- Languages: Silent; English intertitles

Before Midnight is a 1925 American silent drama film directed by John G. Adolfi and starring William Russell, Barbara Bedford and Brinsley Shaw.

== Cast ==
- William Russell as Tom Galloway
- Barbara Bedford as Helen Saldivar
- Brinsley Shaw as Dobbs, valet
- Alan Roscoe as J. Dallas Durand
- Rex Lease as Julio Saldivar

== Bibliography ==
- Munden, Kenneth White. The American Film Institute Catalog of Motion Pictures Produced in the United States, Part 1. University of California Press, 1997.
