= The Cheater Reformed =

1921 film

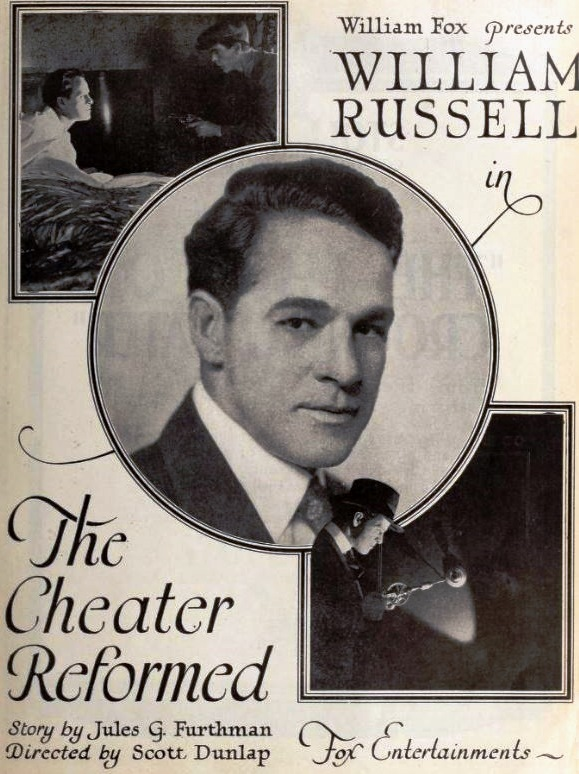
- Directed by: Scott R. Dunlap
- Written by: Scott R. Dunlap; Jules Furthman
- Produced by: William Fox
- Starring: William Russell; Seena Owen; Sam De Grasse
- Cinematography: Clyde De Vinna
- Production company: Fox Film
- Distributed by: Fox Film
- Release date: January 2, 1921
- Running time: 50 minutes
- Country: United States
- Languages: Silent; English intertitles

The Cheater Reformed is a 1921 American silent drama film directed by Scott R. Dunlap and starring William Russell, Seena Owen and Sam De Grasse.

== Cast ==
- William Russell as Jordan McCall / Dr. Luther McCall
- Seena Owen as Carol McCall
- Jack Brammall as Buster Dorsey
- Sam De Grasse as Thomas Edinburgh
- Ruth King as Mrs. Edinburgh

== Bibliography ==
- Munden, Kenneth White. The American Film Institute Catalog of Motion Pictures Produced in the United States, Part 1. University of California Press, 1997.
