= Jules Furthman =

American screenwriter and journalist (1888–1966)

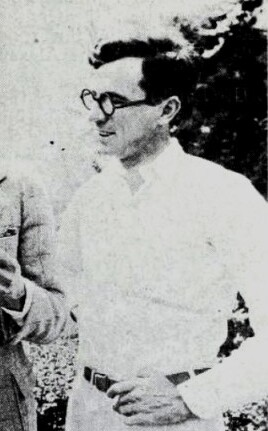
- Furthman in 1923
- Born: March 5, 1888; Chicago, Illinois, U.S.
- Died: September 22, 1966 (aged 78); Oxford, Oxfordshire, England
- Resting place: Forest Lawn Memorial Park
- Occupations: Screenwriter, director and producer
- Years active: 1915–1959
- Spouse: Sybil Seely (m. 1920)
- Children: 1

Jules Furthman (March 5, 1888 – September 22, 1966) was an American magazine and newspaper writer before working as a screenwriter. Pauline Kael once wrote that Furthman "has written about half of the most entertaining movies to come out of Hollywood (Ben Hecht wrote most of the other half)."

== Biography ==
Furthman was born in Chicago. His brother was the writer Charles Furthman. During World War I he wrote under the pen name "Stephen Fox" as he thought Furthman sounded too German.

He wrote screenplays for a number of important or popular films, including The Docks of New York (1928), Thunderbolt (1929), Merely Mary Ann (1931), Shanghai Express (1932), Bombshell (1933), Mutiny on the Bounty (1935), Come and Get It (1936), Only Angels Have Wings (1939), To Have and Have Not (1944), The Big Sleep (1946), and Nightmare Alley (1947). He wrote credited screenplays for eight films directed by Josef von Sternberg and an equal number for Howard Hawks.

He was nominated for an Academy Award for Writing Adapted Screenplay for Mutiny on the Bounty.

In 1920, he married the actress Sybil Seely, who played in five films directed by Buster Keaton. She and Furthman had a son in 1921, and she retired from acting in 1922. They remained together until his death.

Furthman died of a cerebral hemorrhage in 1966 in Oxford, Oxfordshire, United Kingdom. His remains were brought home and interred in Forest Lawn Memorial Park Cemetery in Glendale, California.

== Legacy ==
On the UK television program Scene By Scene, host Mark Cousins said, "Furthman wrote some of your best lines and he also wrote for her (Marlene Dietrich), those sort of, sexy and ambiguous lines." Lauren Bacall replied, "He did? Well, that I didn't know. I asked Howard Hawks once, why he used Furthman; as he didn't write the entire screenplay. And he (Hawks) said, 'If there are five ways to play a scene, he (Furthman) will write a sixth way.' And of course, that makes perfect sense and that's exactly what Furthman did. He always came around the back way and suddenly there was a little surprise there."

== List of screenplays ==
- Steady Company (1915) (story) (as Julius G. Furthman)
- Bound on the Wheel (1915) (story) (as Julius G. Furthman)
- Chasing the Limited (1915) (scenario)
- Mountain Justice (1915) (story) (as Julius G. Furthman)
- A Fiery Introduction (1915) (story) (as Julius G. Furthman)
- Quits (1915) (as Julius G. Furthman)
- The Little Blonde in Black (1915)
- High Play (1917) (scenario) (as Jules Grinnell Furthmann)
- The Frame-Up (1917)
- The Shackles of Truth (1917) (story) (as Julius Grinnell Furthman)
- The Masked Heart (1917) (story) (as Julius Grinnell Furthmann)
- Souls in Pawn (1917) (story)
- The Mantle of Charity (1918) (as Stephen Fox)
- A Camouflage Kiss (1918) (as Stephen Fox)
- Hearts or Diamonds? (1918)
- Up Romance Road (1918) (as Stephen Fox)
- A Japanese Nightingale (1918)
- Hobbs in a Hurry (1918) (scenario) (as Stephen Fox)
- All the World to Nothing (1918) (as Stephen Fox)
- Wives and Other Wives (1918) (as Stephen Fox)
- When a Man Rides Alone (1919) (as Stephen Fox)
- Where the West Begins (1919)
- Brass Buttons (1919) (as Stephen Fox)
- Some Liar (1919) (scenario) (as Stephen Fox)
- A Sporting Chance (1919) (as Stephen Fox)
- This Hero Stuff (1919) (story) (as Stephen Fox)
- Six Feet Four (1919) (as Stephen Fox)
- Victory (1919) (as Stephen Fox)
- The Lincoln Highwayman (1919) (adaptation)
- The Beloved Cheater (1919) (story) (as Steven Fox)
- Would You Forgive? (1920)
- The Valley of Tomorrow (1920) (as Stephen Fox)
- Treasure Island (1920) (as Stephen Fox)
- Leave It to Me (1920) (scenario)
- Twins of Suffering Creek (1920) (scenario)
- A Sister to Salome (1920)
- The Great Redeemer (1920) (adaptation)
- The White Circle (1920)
- The Man Who Dared (1920) (as Julius G. Furthman)
- The Skywayman (1920)
- The Texan (1920) (scenario)
- The Iron Rider (1920) (scenario)
- The Land of Jazz (1920)
- High Gear Jeffrey (1921)
- The Cheater Reformed (1921)
- The Big Punch (1921)
- The Blushing Bride (1921)
- Colorado Pluck (1921)
- Singing River (1921)
- The Last Trail (1921)
- The Roof Tree (1921)
- Pawn Ticket 210 (1922)
- Gleam O'Dawn (1922)
- The Ragged Heiress (1922)
- Arabian Love (1922)
- The Yellow Stain (1922)
- Strange Idols (1922)
- Calvert's Valley (1922)
- The Love Gambler (1922)
- A California Romance (1922)
- Lovebound (1923)
- St. Elmo (1923)
- North of Hudson Bay (1923)
- The Acquittal (1923)
- Condemned (1923)
- Try and Get It (1924) (adaptation)
- Call of the Mate (1924)
- Romola (1924) (titles)
- Sackcloth and Scarlet (1925)
- Any Woman (1925)
- Before Midnight (1925)
- Big Pal (1925)
- The Wise Guy (1926)
- You'd Be Surprised (1926)
- Hotel Imperial (1927)
- The Love Wager (1927)
- Casey at the Bat (1927)
- Fashions for Women (1927)
- The Way of All Flesh (1927)
- Barbed Wire (1927)
- The City Gone Wild (1927)
- Abie's Irish Rose (1928)
- The Drag Net (1928)
- The Docks of New York (1928)
- The Case of Lena Smith (1929)
- Thunderbolt (1929) (story)
- New York Nights (1929) (adaptation)
- For The Defense (1930) (story)
- Common Clay (1930)
- Renegades (1930) (adaptation)
- Morocco (1930) (adaptation)
- Body and Soul (1931)
- Cuerpo y alma (1931)
- Merely Mary Ann (1931)
- The Yellow Ticket (1931)
- Over the Hill (1931)
- Shanghai Express (1932)
- Blonde Venus (1932) (story) (uncredited)
- Bombshell (1933)
- China Seas (1935)
- Mutiny on the Bounty (1935)
- Come and Get It (1936)
- Spawn of the North (1938)
- Only Angels Have Wings (1939)
- Zaza (1939) (uncredited)
- The Way of All Flesh (1940) (story)
- The Shanghai Gesture (1941)
- The Outlaw (1943)
- To Have and Have Not (1944)
- The Big Sleep (1946)
- Moss Rose (1947)
- Nightmare Alley (1947)
- Pretty Baby (1950) (story)
- Peking Express (1951)
- Jet Pilot (1957)
- Rio Bravo (1959)
