= Twins of Suffering Creek =

1920 film

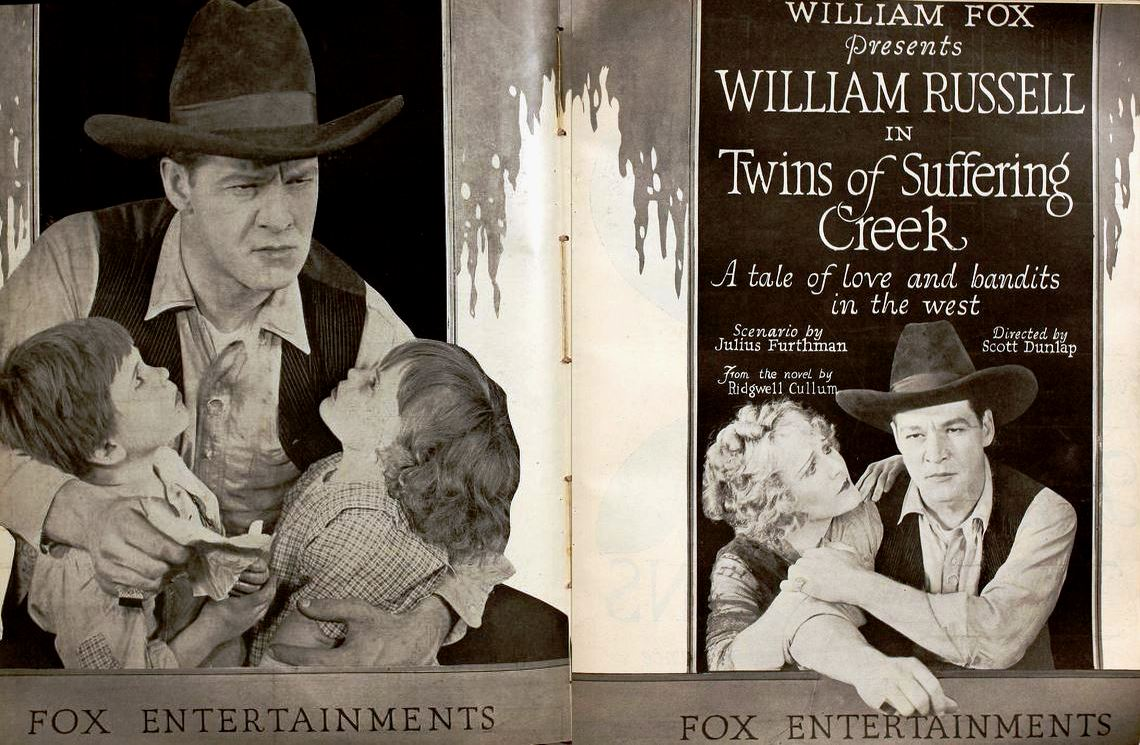
- Promotion of Twins of Suffering Creek in Motion Picture News
- Directed by: Scott R. Dunlap
- Written by: Jules Furthman (scenario)
- Based on: The Twins of Suffering Creek by Ridgwell Cullum
- Produced by: Scott R. Dunlap
- Starring: William Russell; Louise Lovely; E. Alyn Warren; William Ryno; Henry Hebert
- Cinematography: Clyde De Vinna
- Production company: Fox Film Corporation
- Distributed by: Fox Film Corporation
- Release date: June 1920
- Running time: 5 reels
- Country: United States
- Languages: Silent; English intertitles

Twins of Suffering Creek is a 1920 American silent Western film directed by Scott R. Dunlap and starring William Russell, Louise Lovely, E. Alyn Warren, William Ryno, and Henry Hebert. It is based on 1912 novel of the same name by Ridgwell Cullum. The film was released by Fox Film Corporation in June 1920.

== Cast ==
- William Russell as Bill Lark
- Louise Lovely as Little Casino
- E. Alyn Warren as Scipio Jones (as E.A. Warren)
- William Ryno as Minky Clark (as Billy Rhyno)
- Henry Hebert as Jim Pemberton (as Henry J. Herbert)
- Joe Ray as Sunny Oak
- Florence Deshon as Jess Jones
- Malcolm Cripe as Twin Boy
- Helen Stone as Twin Girl

== See also ==
- 1937 Fox vault fire
