= Lucy Payton =

American silent film actress

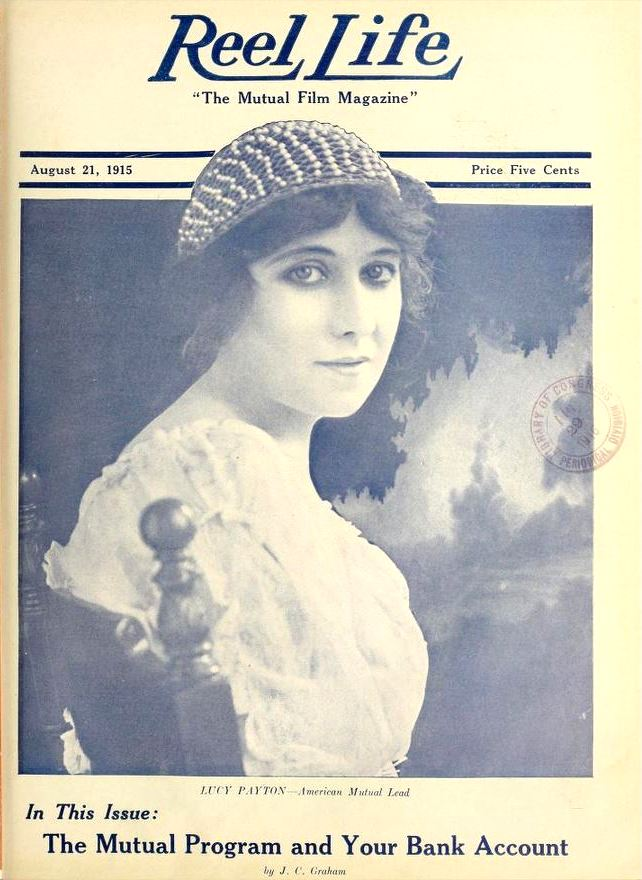
Payton on the cover of Reel Life magazine

Lucy Payton (12 October 1877 in Kansas – 15 January 1969 in Louisiana, Missouri) was an American silent film actress.

Lucy married another actor, Claude Payton.

== Filmography ==
- His Old-Fashioned Dad (1917) .... Nettie Wright
- The Yellow Bullet (1917) .... Teresa Fowler
- Pamela's Past (1916)
- Shadows and Sunshine (1916) .... Her Mother
- The Code of the Hills (1916)
- The Love Liar (1916) .... Margie Gay
- The Tenor (1915)
- The Secretary of Frivolous Affairs (1915) .... The Maid
- The Electric Alarm (1915) .... Mary's mother
- The Lure of the Mask (1915) .... Enrichetta
- The Last Concert (1915) .... Undetermined Role
- Was She Right in Forgiving Him? (1914)
- Pamela Congreve (1914)
