= The Electric Alarm =

1915 film

- Directed by: Tod Browning
- Produced by: Harry Aitken
- Starring: A. E. Freeman; Charles Gorman
- Release date: May 18, 1915
- Running time: 1 reel
- Country: United States
- Language: Silent with English intertitles

The Electric Alarm is a 1915 American short drama film directed by Tod Browning and starring A. E. Freeman and Charles Gorman.

== Cast ==
- A. E. Freeman as Ryley
- Charles Gorman as Dick Ray
- Lucy Payton as Mary's mother
- Lilian Webster as Mary
