= Help Wanted – Male =

1920 film by Henry King

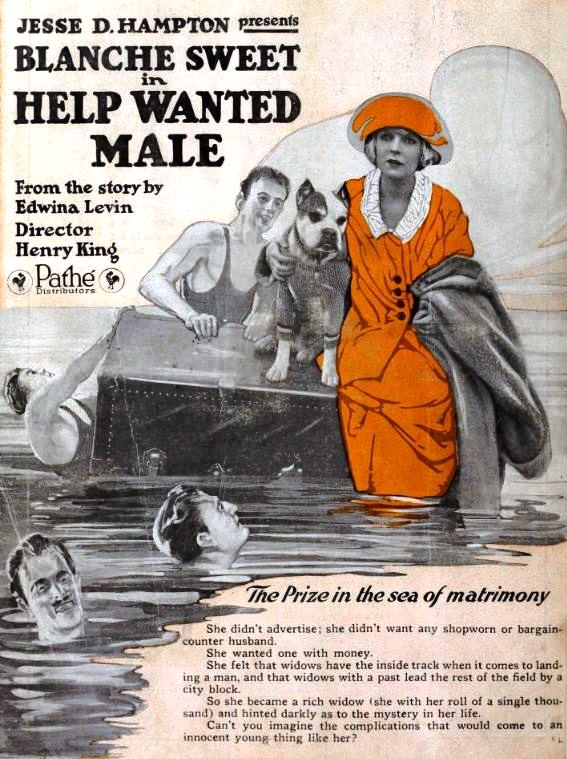
- Advertisement
- Directed by: Henry King
- Written by: Edwina LeVin; George H. Plympton
- Produced by: Jesse D. Hampton
- Starring: Blanche Sweet; Henry King; Frank Leigh
- Cinematography: Lucien N. Andriot
- Edited by: K.E. Anderson
- Production company: Jesse D. Hampton Productions
- Distributed by: Pathé Exchange
- Release date: September 26, 1920
- Running time: 60 minutes
- Country: United States
- Language: Silent (English intertitles)

Help Wanted – Male is a 1920 American silent comedy film directed by Henry King and starring Blanche Sweet, Henry King, and Frank Leigh.

== Cast ==
- Blanche Sweet as Leona Stafford
- Henry King as Tubbs
- Frank Leigh as Clerk
- Mayme Kelso as Mrs. Dale
- Thomas Jefferson as Harris
- Jay Belasco as Lieutenant
- Jean Acker as Ethel

== Preservation ==
The film is now lost.

== See also ==
- Blanche Sweet filmography

== Bibliography ==
- Donald W. McCaffrey & Christopher P. Jacobs. Guide to the Silent Years of American Cinema. Greenwood Publishing, 1999. ISBN 0-313-30345-2
