= Singing River (film) =

1921 film

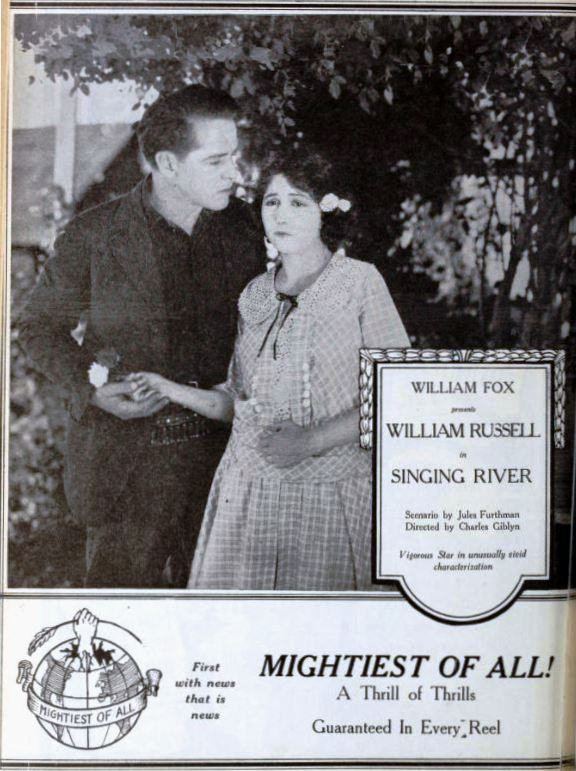
- Directed by: Charles Giblyn
- Written by: Jules Furthman; Robert J. Horton
- Produced by: William Fox
- Starring: William Russell; Vola Vale; Clark Comstock
- Cinematography: George Schneiderman
- Production company: Fox Film
- Distributed by: Fox Film
- Release date: August 21, 1921
- Running time: 50 minutes
- Country: United States
- Languages: Silent; English intertitles

Singing River is a 1921 American silent Western film directed by Charles Giblyn and starring William Russell, Vola Vale and Clark Comstock.

== Cast ==
- William Russell as Long Rush
- Vola Vale as Alice Thornton
- Clark Comstock as John Thornton
- Jack Roseleigh as Lew Bransom
- Arthur Morrison as Sam Hemp
- Jack McDonald as Bert Condon
- Jack Hull as Freud
- Louis King asKane
- Charles King as Grimes

== Bibliography ==
- Solomon, Aubrey. The Fox Film Corporation, 1915-1935: A History and Filmography. McFarland, 2011.
