= Brass Buttons =

1919 film

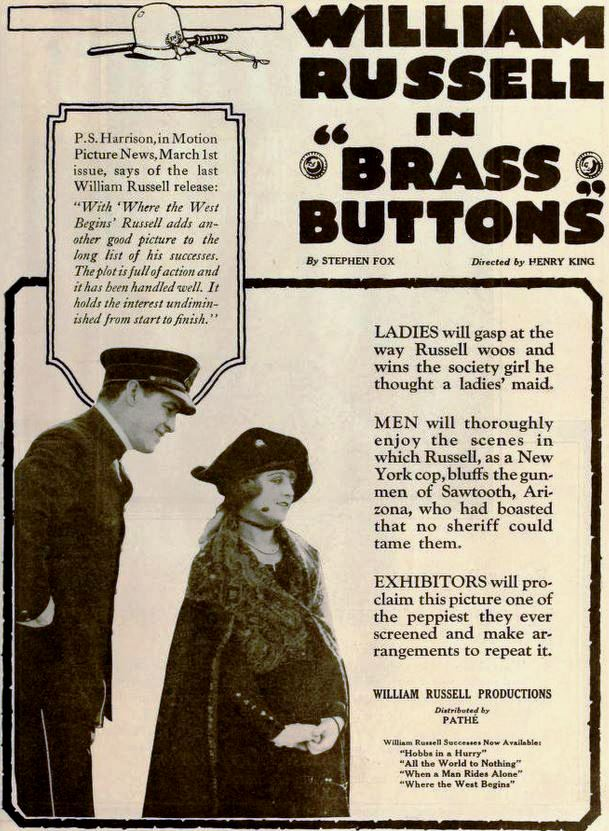
- Advertisement
- Directed by: Henry King
- Written by: Jules Furthman
- Starring: William Russell; Eileen Percy; Helen Howard
- Production company: American Film Company
- Distributed by: Pathé Exchange
- Release date: April 6, 1919
- Running time: 50 minutes
- Country: United States
- Language: Silent (English intertitles)

Brass Buttons is a 1919 American silent comedy Western film directed by Henry King, and starring William Russell, Eileen Percy, and Helen Howard. A New York cop in Arizona tackles a gang of criminals.

== Cast ==
- William Russell as Kingdon Hollister
- Eileen Percy as Bernice Cleveland
- Helen Howard as Madeline
- Frank Brownlee as Terence Callahan
- Bull Montana as Jake the Priest
- Wilbur Higby as Mayor Dave McCullough
- Carl Stockdale as Cold-Deck Dallas

== Bibliography ==
- Donald W. McCaffrey & Christopher P. Jacobs. Guide to the Silent Years of American Cinema. Greenwood Publishing, 1999. ISBN 0-313-30345-2
