= Powers That Prey =

1918 film by Henry King

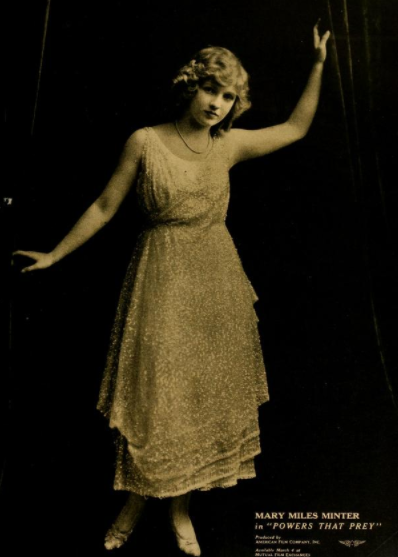
- Directed by: Henry King
- Written by: Will M. Ritchey
- Based on: Extra! Extra! by Will M. Ritchey
- Starring: Mary Miles Minter
- Cinematography: John F. Seitz
- Production company: American Film Company
- Distributed by: Mutual Film
- Release date: March 4, 1918 (United States)
- Running time: 5 reels
- Country: United States
- Language: Silent (English intertitles)

Powers That Prey is a 1918 silent comedy-drama film directed by Henry King and starring Mary Miles Minter, with whom King stated that he enjoyed working. The film is based on a story called Extra! Extra! by Will M. Ritchey, which was also the working title of the film. As with many of Minter's features, it is thought to be a lost film.

== Plot ==
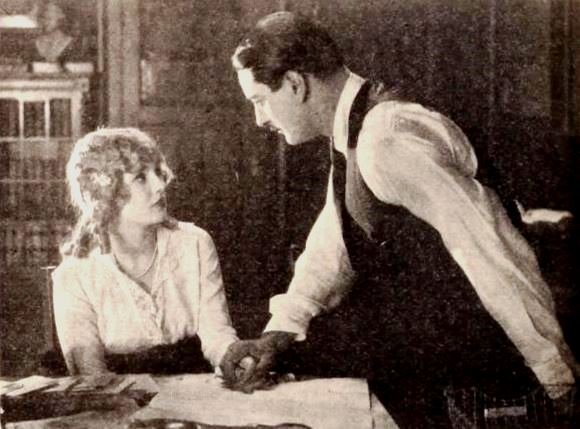
Minter and Forrest in "Powers that Prey"

As described in various film magazine reviews, Sylvia Grant is the daughter of Burton Grant, the owner of the Daily News. Her father makes an enemy of crooked local politician Jarvis McVey after he threatens to expose his shady dealings with a railroad company. Forced to leave town for his own safety, Burton Grant travels to Sylvia's boarding school and tells her where to find the necessary paperwork to install editor Frank Summers as the paper's manager.

Sylvia, however, who runs her school's newspaper and has journalistic ambitions of her own, fills in her name on the power-of-attorney rather than Summers', and takes over the running of the Daily News. She runs the paper according to her own ideals, exposing various merchants who behave in a way that she does not think proper, and discharges many of the staff who oppose her methods, including Summers.

On the verge of ruining the paper, Sylvia happens to overhear McVey plotting to betray the city for his own profit. She rushes to publish an extra, exposing him and calling for him to be tarred and feathered. Summers, despite Sylvia's attempts to fire him, stays around and helps her to condemn McVey. Just as the townsfolk are preparing to act on her suggestion, her father returns.

McVey, having been discredited, leaves town, and with the Daily News taking much of the credit, Sylvia's other journalistic efforts are forgiven and the paper is saved. Summers is returned to his position as editor, and he and Sylvia become engaged.

== Cast ==
- Mary Miles Minter as Sylvia Grant
- Allan Forrest as Frank Summers
- Harvey Clark as Burton Grant
- Clarence Burton as Jarvis McVey
- Lucille Ward as Mrs. Brackett
- Emma Kluge as Mrs. Sharon
- Perry Banks as George Lake
- Robert Miller as Bobs
