= Some Liar =

1919 film

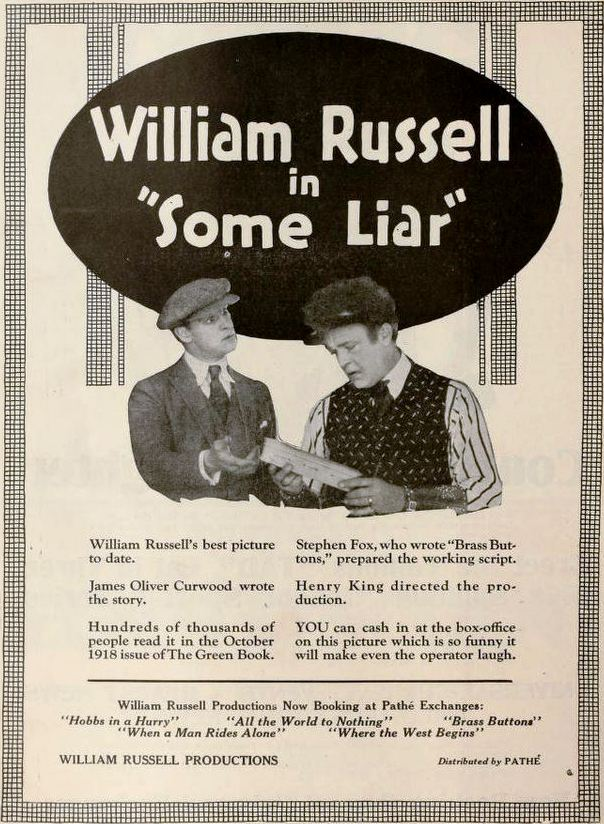
- Directed by: Henry King
- Written by: James Oliver Curwood (story); Jules Furthman
- Starring: William Russell; Eileen Percy; Heywood Mack
- Production company: American Film Company
- Distributed by: Pathé Exchange
- Release date: May 18, 1919
- Running time: 50 minutes
- Country: United States
- Language: Silent (English intertitles)

Some Liar is a 1919 American silent Western comedy film directed by Henry King and starring William Russell, Eileen Percy, and Heywood Mack.

== Cast ==
- William Russell as Robert Winchester McTabb
- Eileen Percy as Celie Sterling
- Heywood Mack as Sheldon Lewis Kellard
- J. Gordon Russell as High Spade McQueen
- John Gough as Loco Ike / Octogenarian suitor

== Bibliography ==
- Donald W. McCaffrey & Christopher P. Jacobs. Guide to the Silent Years of American Cinema. Greenwood Publishing, 1999. ISBN 0-313-30345-2
