= Colorado Pluck =

1921 American film by Jules Furthman

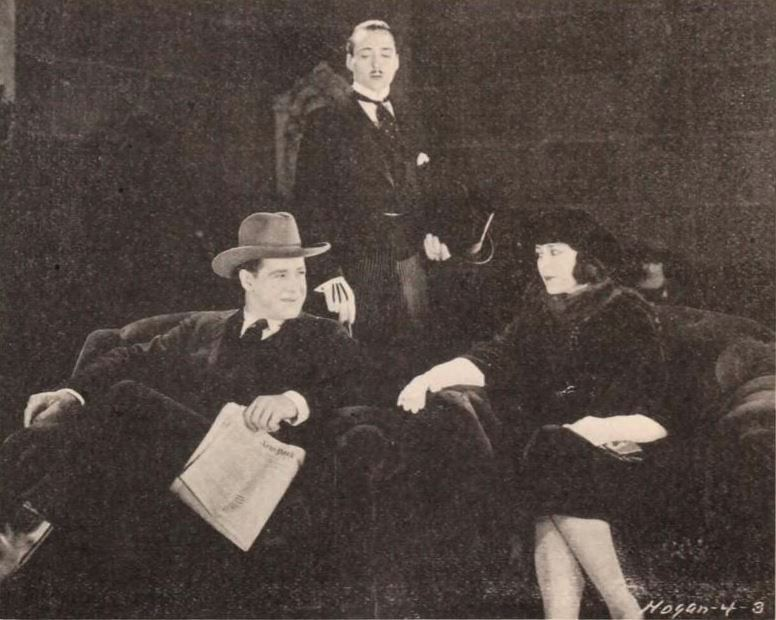
- A still from the film
- Directed by: Jules Furthman
- Written by: Jules Furthman
- Based on: Colorado Jim by George Goodchild
- Starring: William Russell; Margaret Livingston; George Fisher
- Cinematography: George Schneiderman
- Production company: Fox Film Corporation
- Distributed by: Fox Film Corporation
- Release date: May 1, 1921
- Running time: 5 reels
- Country: United States
- Language: Silent (English intertitles)

Colorado Pluck is a lost 1921 drama film directed by Jules Furthman. The film is based on the novel The Taming of Angela by George Goodchild. It is not known whether the film currently survives.

== Plot ==
Newly wealthy Colorado Jim travels to London where he meets Angela Featherstone. The two get married despite Angela telling Jim that the marriage will be "in name only". Angela spends all of Jim's money not long after the wedding, causing the couple to move to Colorado. In Colorado, Jim clashes with Philip Meredith, who wants to steal Angela from him. After Jim is wounded, Angela realizes that she really loves Jim and decides to become more than just a wife "in name only".

== Cast ==
- William Russell as Colorado Jim
- Margaret Livingston as Angela Featherstone
- William Buckley as Reggie Featherstone
- George Fisher as Philip Meredith
- Helen Ware as Lady Featherstone
- Bertram Johns as Lord Featherstone
- Ray Berger as a Butler
