= Vengeance of the Dead =

1917 film

- Directed by: Henry King
- Written by: Lyon Mearson (story)
- Produced by: Balboa Amusement Producing Company; E.D. Horkheimer
- Starring: Henry King
- Distributed by: General Film Company
- Release date: April 5, 1917
- Running time: 4 reels
- Country: USA
- Language: Silent with English titles

Vengeance of the Dead is a 1917 silent film drama directed by and starring Henry King. It was produced by the Balboa Amusement Producing Company, and distributed through General Film Company. It survives in the Library of Congress collection

It was also known as Dungeon of the Dead.

== Cast ==
- Henry King
- Lillian West as Lilas Velso
- Philo McCullough
- Edward Peters
- Daniel Gilfether
- Virginia Lee Corbin
- Mollie McConnell
