= Hearts or Diamonds? =

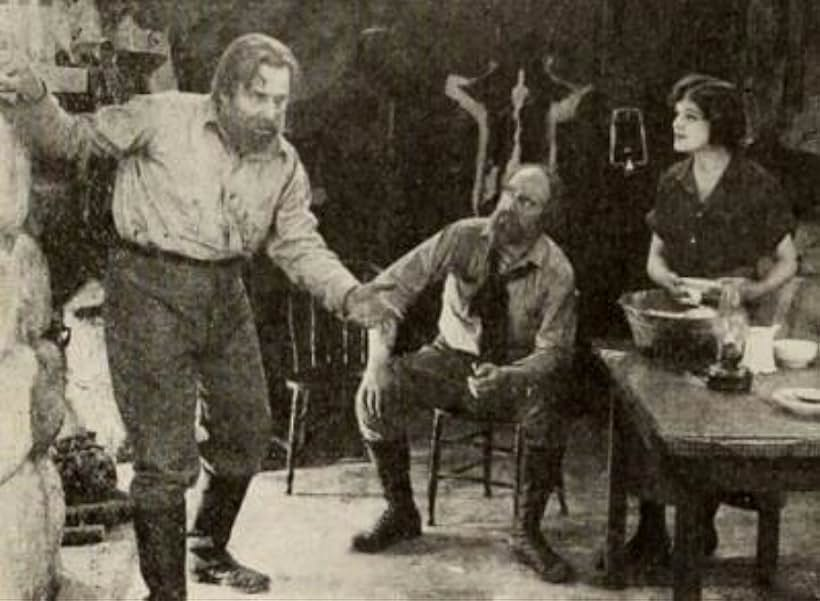
- Directed by: Henry King
- Written by: Jules Furthman; William Hamilton Osborne; William Parker
- Produced by: William Russell
- Starring: William Russell; Charlotte Burton; Howard Davies
- Production company: William Russell Productions
- Distributed by: Mutual Film
- Release date: April 29, 1918
- Running time: 50 minutes
- Country: United States
- Language: Silent (English intertitles)

Hearts or Diamonds? is a 1918 American silent mystery film directed by Henry King and starring William Russell, Charlotte Burton, and Howard Davies.

== Cast ==
- William Russell as Larry Hanrahan
- Charlotte Burton as Adrienne Gascoyne
- Howard Davies as Col. Paul Gascoyne
- Carl Stockdale as Bewley
- John Gough as Wintermute
- Robert Klein as Hoskins

== Bibliography ==
- Donald W. McCaffrey & Christopher P. Jacobs. Guide to the Silent Years of American Cinema. Greenwood Publishing, 1999. ISBN 0-313-30345-2
