= Mollie McConnell =

American actress (1865–1920)

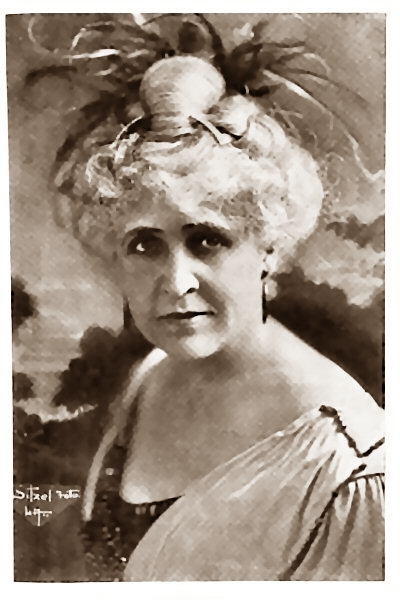
- Who's Who in the Film World, 1914
- Born: September 24, 1865; Chicago, Illinois, US
- Died: December 10, 1920 (aged 55); Los Angeles, California, US
- Other names: Molly McConnell; Mrs. W. McConnell
- Occupation: Actress
- Years active: 1913–1920 (film)
- Spouse(s): Will A. McConnell; Sherwood McDonald

Mollie McConnell (September 24, 1865 – December 10, 1920) was an American silent film and stage actress.

McConnell was born in Chicago, and attended Mills Seminary in Oakland, California. She studied further at "Miss Grant's college" in Chicago, but left there in favor of acting.

Before her 1913 movie debut, McConnell was a national and international theater performer. In 1914, she signed a contract with Balboa Amusement Producing Company and played matronly roles in many of their films. She starred with William Garwood in the 1914 western A Ticket to Red Horse Gulch.

In fall 1890, McConnell married Will A. McConnell, a newspaper editor. Following his death she married director and actor Sherwood McDonald. She died on December 10, 1920, in the Woodward Hotel in Los Angeles.

== Partial filmography ==
- A Ticket to Red Horse Gulch (1914)
- The Red Circle (1915)
- Should a Wife Forgive? (1915)
- Pay Dirt (1916)
- Shadows and Sunshine (1916)
- Joy and the Dragon (1916)
- Vengeance of the Dead (1917)
- The Wildcat (1917)
- The Neglected Wife (1917)
- Bab the Fixer (1917)
- The Climber (1917)
- Set Free (1918)
- No Man's Land (1918)
- Go West, Young Man (1918)
- The Demon (1918)
- Roped (1919)
- Bare Fists (1919)
- One of the Finest (1919)
- Fools and Their Money (1919)
- The Feud (1919)
- Dangerous to Men (1920)
- Black Beauty (1921)
- The Home Stretch (1921)
- Hearts and Masks (1921)
