= R. Henry Grey =

American actor

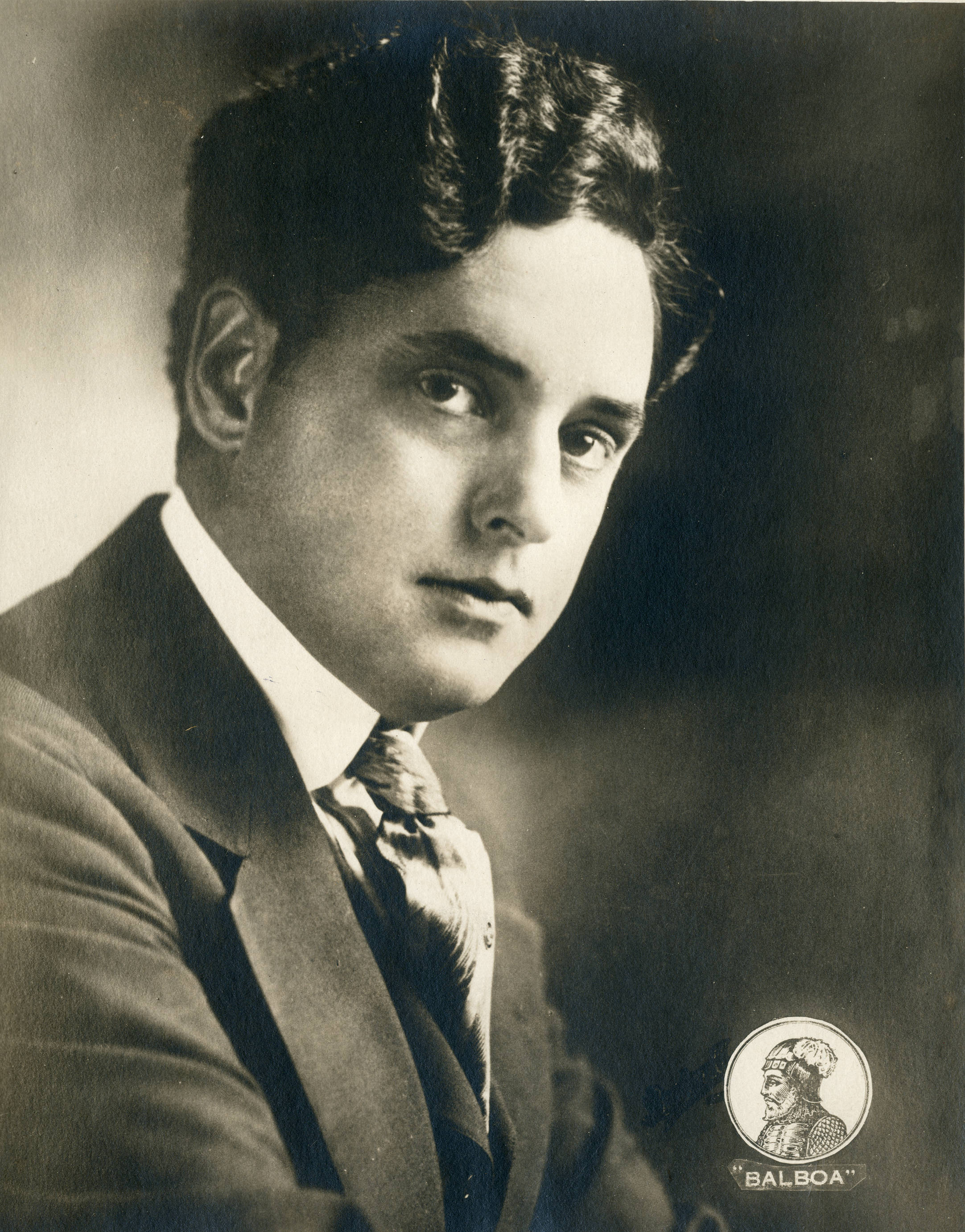
- Grey in 1916
- Born: Robert Henry Grey; July 17, 1891; Oakland, California, United States
- Died: April 26, 1934 (aged 42); Los Angeles, California, United States
- Occupation: Actor
- Years active: 1911-1933

Robert Henry Grey (July 17, 1891 – April 26, 1934) was an American film actor of the silent film era. He appeared in 53 films between 1911 and 1933.

Grey was born in Oakland, California, but moved abroad with his parents when he was a child. His private-school education there made him fluent in German, which enabled him to act in classic drama on stage in German. Returning to the United States, he performed in comic opera and "was one of the foremost juvenile leads in stock circles".

Grey died in Los Angeles, California.

== Selected filmography ==
- The Twelfth Juror (1913)
- Through the Neighbor's Window (1913)
- Shadows and Sunshine (1916)
- Spellbound (1916) as Graham
- Mentioned in Confidence (1917)
- Twin Kiddies (1917)
- Bab the Fixer (1917)
- All of a Sudden Norma (1919)
- Speed (1922)
- The Silent Partner (1923)
