= Six Feet Four =

1919 film

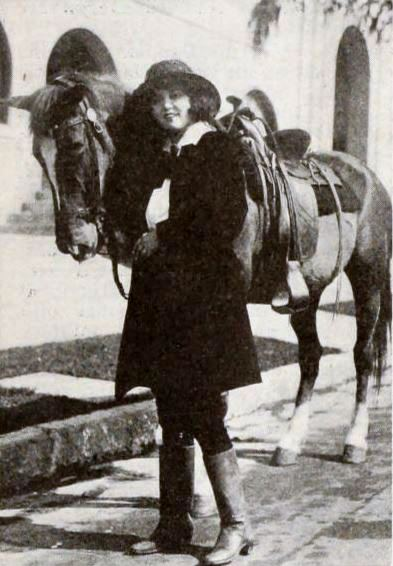
- Viola Vale in a scene.
- Directed by: Henry King
- Written by: Jackson Gregory (novel); Jules Furthman
- Starring: William Russell; Vola Vale; Charles K. French
- Cinematography: George Rizard
- Production company: American Film Company
- Distributed by: Pathé Exchange
- Release date: September 14, 1919
- Running time: 70 minutes
- Country: United States
- Language: Silent (English intertitles)

Six Feet Four is a 1919 American silent Western film directed by Henry King and starring William Russell, Vola Vale, and Charles K. French.

== Cast ==
- William Russell as Buck Thornton
- Vola Vale as Winifred Waverly
- Charles K. French as Henry Pollard
- Harvey Clark as Two-Hand Billy Comstock
- Clarence Burton as Sheriff Cole Dalton
- Al Ernest Garcia as Ben Broderick
- Jack Collins as Ed Bedloe
- Jack Brammall as Kid Bedloe
- John Gough as Jimmie Clayton
- Perry Banks as Old Man Adams
- Calvert Carter as Poke Drury
- Anne Schaefer as Mrs. Riddell

== Preservation ==
A copy of Six Feet Four is held by Library and Archives Canada.

== Bibliography ==
- Donald W. McCaffrey & Christopher P. Jacobs. Guide to the Silent Years of American Cinema. Greenwood Publishing, 1999. ISBN 0-313-30345-2
