= Hobbs in a Hurry =

1918 film

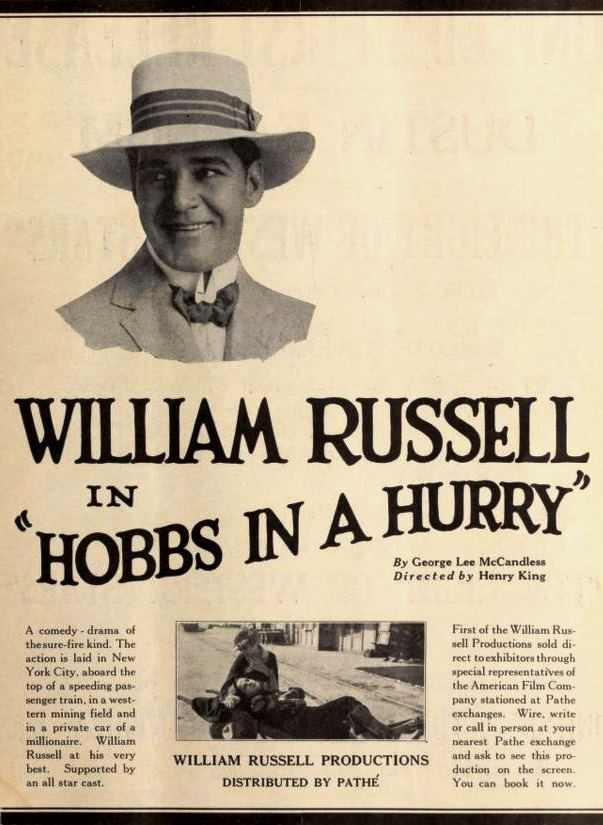
- Advertisement
- Directed by: Henry King
- Written by: Jules Furthman; George Lee McCandless
- Starring: William Russell; Henry A. Barrows; Winifred Westover
- Production company: American Film Company
- Distributed by: Pathé Exchange
- Release date: October 6, 1918
- Running time: 60 minutes
- Country: United States
- Language: Silent (English intertitles)

Hobbs in a Hurry is a 1918 American silent Western film directed by Henry King and starring William Russell, Henry A. Barrows, and Winifred Westover.

== Cast ==
- William Russell as J. Warren Hobbs, Jr.
- Henry A. Barrows as J. Warren Hobbs Sr.
- Winifred Westover as Helen Renshaw
- Richard Morris as Rufus Renshaw
- Hayward Mack as Lord Willoughby / Louis Willoughby
- Carl Stockdale as Angus MacDonald

== Bibliography ==
- Donald W. McCaffrey & Christopher P. Jacobs. Guide to the Silent Years of American Cinema. Greenwood Publishing, 1999. ISBN 0-313-30345-2
