= Salvage (1921 film) =

1921 film by Henry King

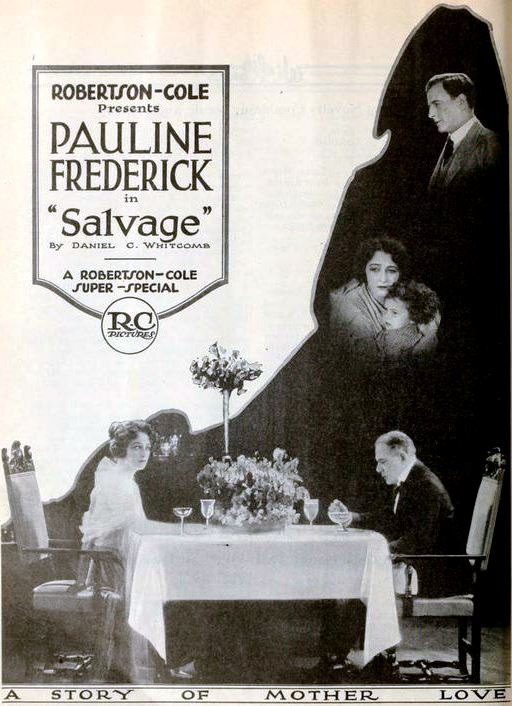
- Directed by: Henry King
- Written by: Daniel F. Whitcomb
- Cinematography: J. Devereaux Jennings (fr)
- Distributed by: Robertson-Cole
- Release date: June 5, 1921: June 5, 1921 (USA)
- Running time: 6 reels
- Country: United States
- Language: Silent (English intertitles)

Salvage is a lost 1921 American silent drama film directed by Henry King and starring Pauline Frederick. It was produced and distributed by the Robertson-Cole Company.

== Cast ==
- Pauline Frederick as Bernice Ridgeway / Kate Martin
- Ralph Lewis as Cyrus Ridgeway
- Milton Sills as Fred Martin
- Helen Stone as Ruth Martin
- Rose Cade as Tessie
- Raymond Hatton as The Cripple
- Hobart Kelly as Baby
