= The Climber (1917 film) =

- Directed by: Henry King
- Written by: George Foxhall; Lela E. Rogers (as Lela Liebrand)
- Produced by: Falcon Features; H. M. Horkheimer; E. D. Horkheimer
- Starring: Henry King; Gibson Gowland
- Distributed by: General Film Company
- Release date: September 28, 1917
- Running time: 4 reels
- Country: USA
- Language: Silent..English intertitles

The Climber is a 1917 silent drama film directed by Henry King and starring himself. The film is listed as a four-reeler, which makes it fall somewhere between a 'short' film and a 'feature' film.

== Cast ==
- Henry King - William Beerheiim Van Broon
- Jack McLaughlin - Bruce Crosby
- Gibson Gowland - Buck Stringer (*billed T.H. Gibson Gowland)
- Robert Ensminger - Grafton
- Charles Blaisdell - Tom Tarney
- James Kerr - Sweeney
- Bruce Smith - Slats O'Keefe
- Frank Erlanger - 'Happy'
- Lucille Pietz - Eva Crosby
- Leah Gibbs - Ethel Crosby
- Arma Carlton - Madelyn Rosseau
- Mollie McConnell - Mrs. Crosby
- Ruth Lackaye - Mrs. Tarney

== Preservation ==
The film survives incomplete in the Library of Congress collection.
