= Up Romance Road =

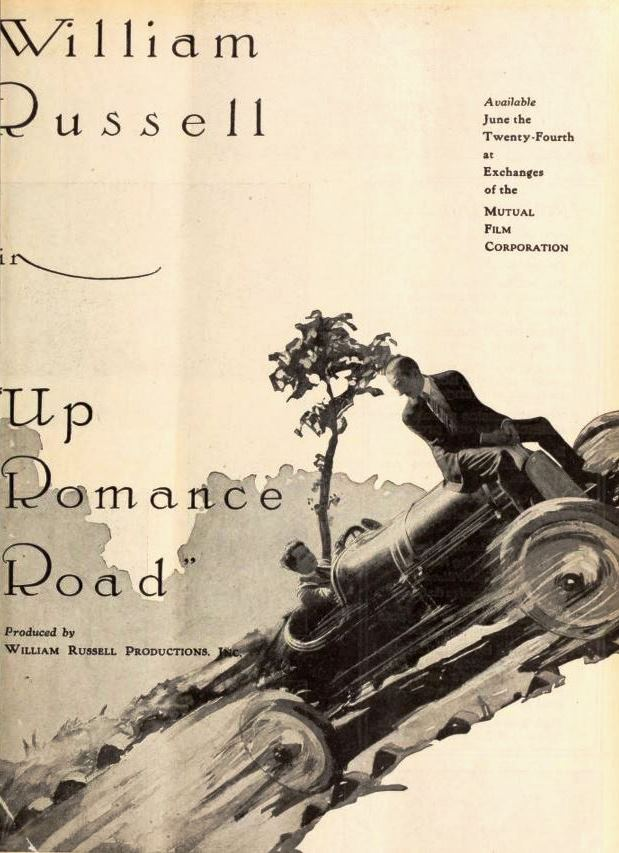
- Advertisement
- Directed by: Henry King
- Written by: Jules Furthman
- Starring: William Russell; Charlotte Burton; John Burton
- Cinematography: John F. Seitz
- Production company: William Russell Productions
- Distributed by: Mutual Film
- Release date: June 24, 1918
- Running time: 50 minutes
- Country: United States
- Languages: Silent; English intertitles

Up Romance Road is a 1918 American silent comedy film directed by Henry King and starring William Russell, Charlotte Burton, and John Burton.

== Cast ==
- William Russell as Gregory Thorne
- Charlotte Burton as Marta Millbanke
- John Burton as Samuel Thorne
- Joseph Belmont as Thomas Millbanke
- Carl Stockdale as Count Hilgar Eckstrom
- Emma Kluge as Mrs. Millbanke
- Claire Du Brey as Hilda

== Plot ==
Gregory Thorne is engaged to Marta Milbanke. Both of their fathers are wealthy ship owners. Marta's father receives an anonymous letter which warns of disaster if a shipload of supplies for the Allies leaves the docks. Gregory sees an opportunity for adventure and tells Mr. Marta's father that he knows who wrote the letter, but won't say who it is. He suspects Count Eckstrom and confronts him. Gregory is forced to end his engagement to Marta, but opts for more adventure by planning to kidnap her. Unknown to Gregory, Eckstrom also plans to kidnap Marta. The two men and their cohorts clash. Marta is kidnapped by Eckstrom's men. Gregory is also caught and held as hostage. Gregory must now outwit Eckstrom's men, save Marta, and rescue her father's business.

== Bibliography ==
- Donald W. McCaffrey & Christopher P. Jacobs. Guide to the Silent Years of American Cinema. Greenwood Publishing, 1999. ISBN 0-313-30345-2
