= The Wildcat (1917 film) =

- Directed by: Sherwood MacDonald
- Written by: Daniel F. Whitcomb
- Produced by: Balboa Amusement Producing Company; E. D. Horkheimer; H. M. Horkheimer
- Starring: Jackie Saunders
- Cinematography: William Beckway
- Distributed by: Mutual Film
- Release date: April 25, 1917
- Running time: 5 reels
- Country: United States
- Language: Silent film (English intertitles)

The Wildcat is a lost 1917 silent film comedy drama produced by Balboa Amusement Producing Company, distributed by the Mutual Film company and starring Jackie Saunders.

== Cast ==
- Jackie Saunders – Bethesda Carewe, The Wildcat
- Daniel Gilfether – Roger Carewe
- Mollie McConnell – Mathilda Carewe
- Arthur Shirley – Mortimer Hunt
- Nell Holman – Mollie
- Bruce Smith –
