= The Lincoln Highwayman =

1919 film directed by Emmett J. Flynn

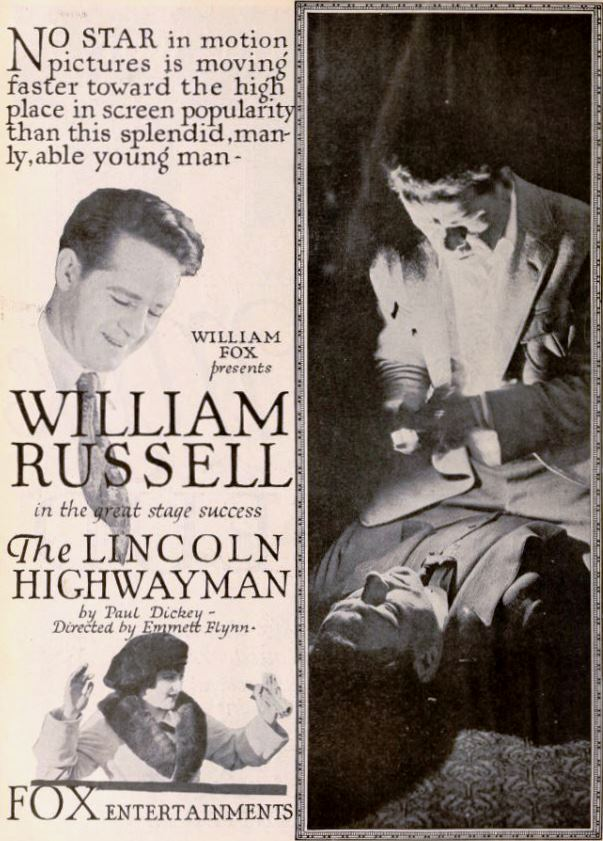
- Advertising for The Lincoln Highwayman on page 18 of the Exhibitors Herald (December 20, 1919).
- Directed by: Emmett J. Flynn
- Written by: Paul Dickey (play); Emmett J. Flynn (scenario); Jules Furthman (adaptation)
- Starring: William Russell; Lois Lee; Frank Brownlee; Jack Connolly; Edward Peil Sr.
- Cinematography: Clyde De Vinna
- Edited by: C.R. Wallace
- Production company: Fox Film Corporation
- Distributed by: Fox Film Corporation
- Release date: December 28, 1919
- Running time: 5 reels
- Country: United States
- Languages: Silent film (English intertitles)

The Lincoln Highwayman is a 1919 American silent mystery film directed by Emmett J. Flynn, and starring William Russell, Lois Lee, Frank Brownlee, Jack Connolly, and Edward Peil Sr. The film was released by Fox Film Corporation on December 28, 1919.

== Plot ==
The story is about a masked bandit (the "Lincoln Highwayman") who terrorizes motorists on the highway in California. His latest victims are a San Francisco banker and his family on their way to a party. While the masked highwayman holds them up at gun point and steals the women's jewels, the banker's daughter Marian (Lois Lee) finds herself strangely attracted to him. When the family finally arrives at the party, they tell the guests their tale. Steele, a secret service man (Edward Piel), takes an interest in their encounter and starts working on the case. Jimmy Clunder (William Russell), who arrives late is talking to Marian when a locket falls out of his pocket. Marian recognizes it, and Clunder claims that he found it on the Lincoln Highway. She begins to suspect that he is the Lincoln Highwayman, as does Steele, Clunder's rival for Marian's love.

== Cast ==
- William Russell as Jimmy Clunder
- Lois Lee as Marian Calvert
- Frank Brownlee as Captain Claver
- Jack Connolly as Mack
- Edward Peil Sr. as Steele
- Harry Spingler as Danny Murphy
- Edwin B. Tilton as The Governor

== Preservation ==
The film is now considered lost.
