= This Hero Stuff =

1919 film

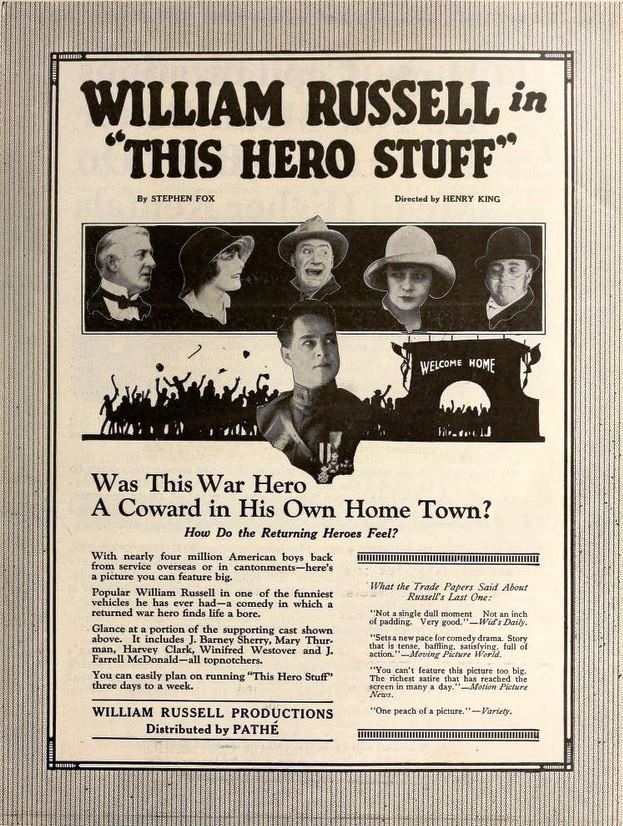
- Advertisement
- Directed by: Henry King
- Written by: Jules Furthman
- Starring: William Russell; Winifred Westover; J. Barney Sherry
- Production company: American Film Company
- Distributed by: Pathé Exchange
- Release date: August 10, 1919
- Running time: 50 minutes
- Country: United States
- Languages: Silent; English intertitles

This Hero Stuff is a lost 1919 American silent Western comedy film directed by Henry King and starring William Russell, Winifred Westover, and J. Barney Sherry.

== Cast ==
- William Russell as Captain November Jones
- Winifred Westover as Nedra Joseph
- J. Barney Sherry as Jackson J. Joseph
- Charles K. French as Samuel Barnes
- Mary Thurman as Teddy Craig
- Harvey Clark as Jonathan Pillsbury
- J. Farrell MacDonald as Softnose Smith

== Preservation ==
With no holdings located in archives, This Hero Stuff is considered a lost film.

== Bibliography ==
- Donald W. McCaffrey & Christopher P. Jacobs. Guide to the Silent Years of American Cinema. Greenwood Publishing, 1999.
