= The Twelfth Juror =

1913 film

- Directed by: George Lessey
- Written by: Ben F. Wilson
- Starring: Ben F. Wilson
- Production company: Edison Studios
- Distributed by: General Film Company
- Release date: April 19, 1913
- Running time: 1 reel
- Country: United States
- Language: Silent with English intertitles

The Twelfth Juror is a 1913 American silent short drama film directed by George Lessey, features an early appearance of Harold Lloyd in an uncredited role.

== Plot ==
According to a film magazine, "Harry Baker and Alice Charlton meet at the preparations for a barn dance. He takes her home in his auto and this is the beginning of their love affair. At the dance each girl brings a necktie to match her apron. The boys choose their partners by drawing ties, which are wrapped. Clarence Morton, a rival to Harry, marks the wrapper of Alice's tie and gets her for a partner. Harry learns of this later and he and Clarence fight it out outside. A biting frost comes on and the dancers leave to protect the orange trees with smudge pots. Clarence comes across some smudge pots belonging to Jeff Robey, a neighbor of Harry, and starts to take them to his own grove. Robey comes along and accuses Clarence of theft. They quarrel and Clarence is accidentally killed by a pruning knife. Robey flees. Harry finds Clarence there; drops his own pruning knife and runs for help. He is arrested and tried for murder. Robey is drafted as the twelfth juror. Harry is convicted. At the crying of Alice, Robey breaks down and confesses."

== Cast ==
- Ben F. Wilson as Harry Baker
- Laura Sawyer as Alice Charlton
- Jack Conway as Clarence Morton
- R. Henry Grey as Jeff Robey (as Robert Grey)
- Harold Lloyd as Boy at Barn Dance (uncredited)

== See also ==
- Harold Lloyd filmography
