= The Iron Rider =

1920 film

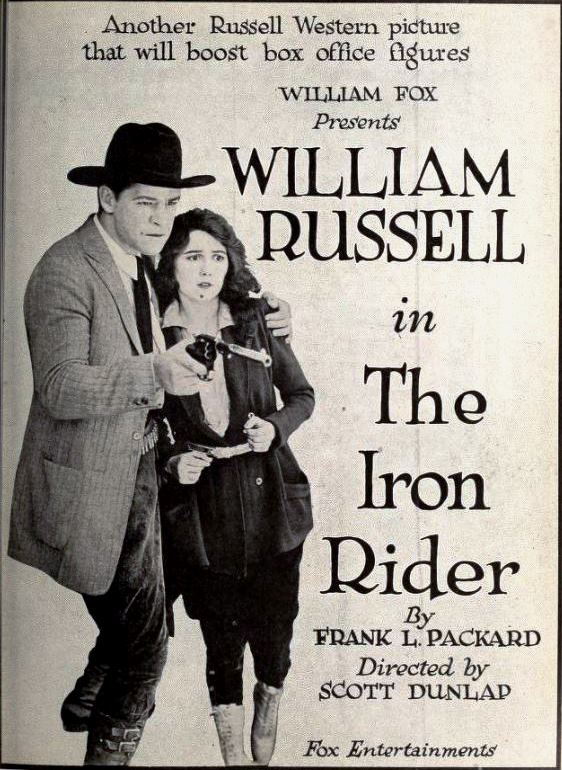
- Directed by: Scott R. Dunlap
- Written by: Jules Furthman; Frank L. Packard
- Produced by: William Fox
- Starring: William Russell; Vola Vale; Arthur Morrison
- Cinematography: Clyde De Vinna
- Production company: Fox Film
- Distributed by: Fox Film
- Release date: November 21, 1920
- Running time: 50 minutes
- Country: United States
- Languages: Silent; English intertitles

The Iron Rider is a 1920 American silent Western film directed by Scott R. Dunlap and starring William Russell, Vola Vale and Clark Comstock.

== Cast ==
- William Russell as Larry Lannigan
- Vola Vale as Mera Donovan
- Clark Comstock as John Thornton
- Arthur Morrison as Jim Mason
- Wadsworth Harris as Sheriff Donovan
- George Nichols as John Lannigan

== Bibliography ==
- Solomon, Aubrey. The Fox Film Corporation, 1915-1935: A History and Filmography. McFarland, 2011.
