= Clark Comstock =

American actor

- Born: January 7, 1862; Yukatan, Minnesota, United States
- Died: May 24, 1934 (aged 72); Los Angeles, California, United States
- Occupation: Actor
- Years active: 1915–1930 (film)

Clark Comstock (1862–1934) was an American film actor of the silent and early sound era. He appeared in around 50 films and serials between 1915 and 1930, many of them westerns.

== Selected filmography ==
- The Westerners (1919)
- The Iron Rider (1920)
- A Broadway Cowboy (1920)
- Opened Shutters (1921)
- A Shocking Night (1921)
- Singing River (1921)
- The Radio King (1922)
- Blazing Arrows (1922)
- Silver Spurs (1922)
- Beasts of Paradise (1923)
- The Sunset Trail (1924)
- Ride for Your Life (1924)
- Ace of Spades (1925)
- The Speed Demon (1925)
- The Calgary Stampede (1925)
- The Red Rider (1925)
- The Fighting Peacemaker (1926)
- The Wild Horse Stampede (1926)
- The Buckaroo Kid (1926)
- Looking for Trouble (1926)
- Flashing Fangs (1926)
- Prisoners of the Storm (1926)
- The Arizona Whirlwind (1927)
- Silver Valley (1927)
- Rough and Ready (1927)
- Singed (1927)
- Hey! Hey! Cowboy (1927)
- Heart Trouble (1928)
- The Avenging Shadow (1928)
- Tracked (1928)
- The Oklahoma Sheriff (1930)

== Bibliography ==
- Katchmer, George A. A Biographical Dictionary of Silent Film Western Actors and Actresses. McFarland, 2015.
