= Where the West Begins (1919 film) =

1919 film

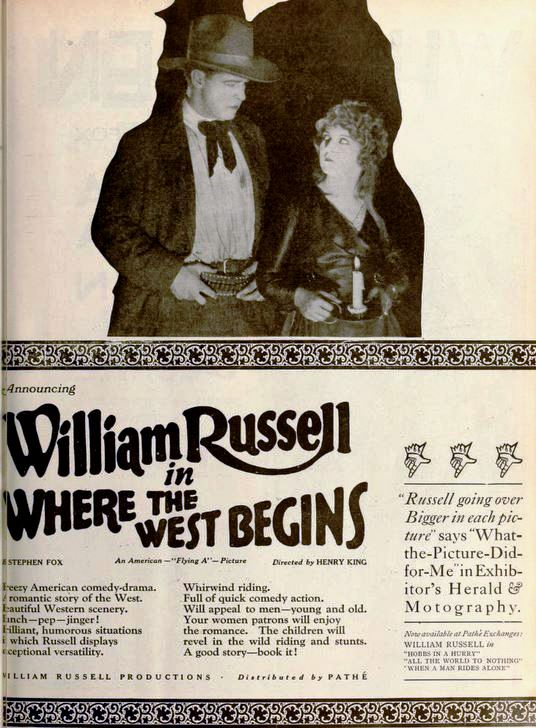
- Advertisement
- Directed by: Henry King
- Written by: Jules Furthman
- Starring: William Russell; Eileen Percy; Cullen Landis
- Production company: American Film Company
- Distributed by: Pathé Exchange
- Release date: March 2, 1919
- Running time: 50 minutes
- Country: United States
- Language: Silent (English intertitles)

Where the West Begins is a 1919 American silent Western film directed by Henry King and starring William Russell, Eileen Percy and Cullen Landis.

== Cast ==
- William Russell as Cliff Redfern
- Eileen Percy as Prudence Caldwell
- Cullen Landis as Ned Caldwell
- Frederick Vroom as Luther Caldwell
- Carl Stockdale as Gunner McCann
- Al Ferguson as Blackthorn Kennedy

== Bibliography ==
- Donald W. McCaffrey & Christopher P. Jacobs. Guide to the Silent Years of American Cinema. Greenwood Publishing, 1999. ISBN 0-313-30345-2
