= The Devil's Bait =

1917 film

- Directed by: Harry Harvey
- Written by: Will M. Ritchey
- Produced by: Balboa Amusement Producing Company; E.D. Horkheimer; H.M. Horkheimer; Harry A. Pollard
- Starring: Ruth Roland
- Distributed by: General Film Company
- Release date: March 1917
- Running time: 4 reels
- Country: United States
- Language: Silent..(English intertitles)

The Devil's Bait is an extant 1917 American dramatic silent feature film starring Ruth Roland, an actress usually associated with serials. It was directed by Harry Harvey and produced by the Balboa Amusement Producing Company. General Film Company handled the distribution.

Future director Henry King, still an actor at this time, appears as a supporting player in the film. This movie exists in the Library of Congress collection.

== Cast ==
- Ruth Roland - Doris Sheldon
- William Conklin - Dr. Royal Sheldon
- Ed Brady - Jason Davies (* billed Edwin J. Brady)
- Henry King - Eric Reese
- Lucy Blake - Madame De Long
- Myrtle Reeves - Anita
- Gordon Sackville -
- Lucille Serwill -
- Zada Marlo -
- Charles Dudley -
