= William Russell (American actor) =

American actor (1884–1929)

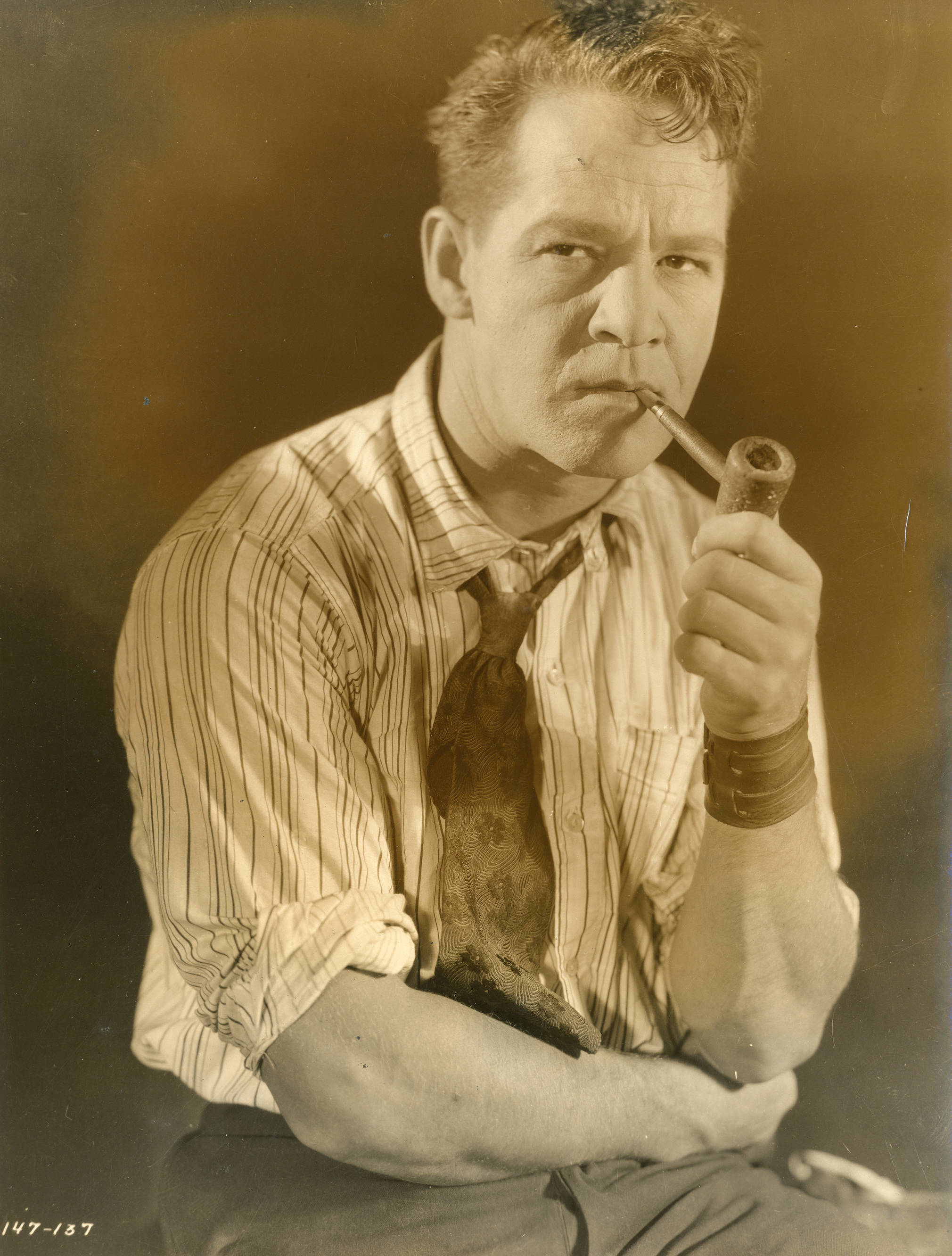
- Russell in 1923
- Born: William Lerche; April 12, 1884; New York City, NY, U.S.
- Died: February 18, 1929 (aged 44); Los Angeles, California, U.S.
- Occupation: Actor
- Years active: 1892–1929
- Spouses: Charlotte Burton (m. 1917; div. 1921) Helen Ferguson (m. 1925)

William Russell (born William Lerche; April 12, 1884 – February 18, 1929) was an American actor, film director, film producer and screenwriter. He appeared in over two hundred silent-era motion pictures between 1910 and 1929, directing five of them in 1916 and producing two through his own production company in 1918 and 1925.

== Early life and career ==
Born in the Bronx borough of New York City, Russell began his acting career on the stage when he was eight years old. He appeared with such notables as Ethel Barrymore, Chauncey Olcott, Blanche Bates, Maude Adams and others.

Russell's Broadway credits include Princess Flavia (1925), Cyrano de Bergerac (1923), and The Tenderfoot (1904).

His career came to a stop when he was 16, however, when he became an invalid. Through rigorous physical therapy, he recovered his health six years later. He then became an amateur boxing champion.

== Motion pictures ==
Russell began his screen career in New York with the Biograph Company, where he worked for nine months before signing with the Thanhouser Company. He was also part of the company of players for the American Film Manufacturing Company and its Flying "A" Studios in Santa Barbara.

In 1917, he and actress Charlotte Burton were married. They divorced in 1921. He and actress Helen Ferguson were married on June 21, 1925, at the Wilshire Boulevard Congregational Church, after a six-year romance.

William Russell died at the age of 44 from pneumonia at Hollywood Hospital in Los Angeles. He is entombed in the Great Mausoleum, Sanctuary of Love, at Forest Lawn Cemetery, Glendale. His brother, director Albert Russell, died two weeks later from pneumonia.

== Selected filmography ==
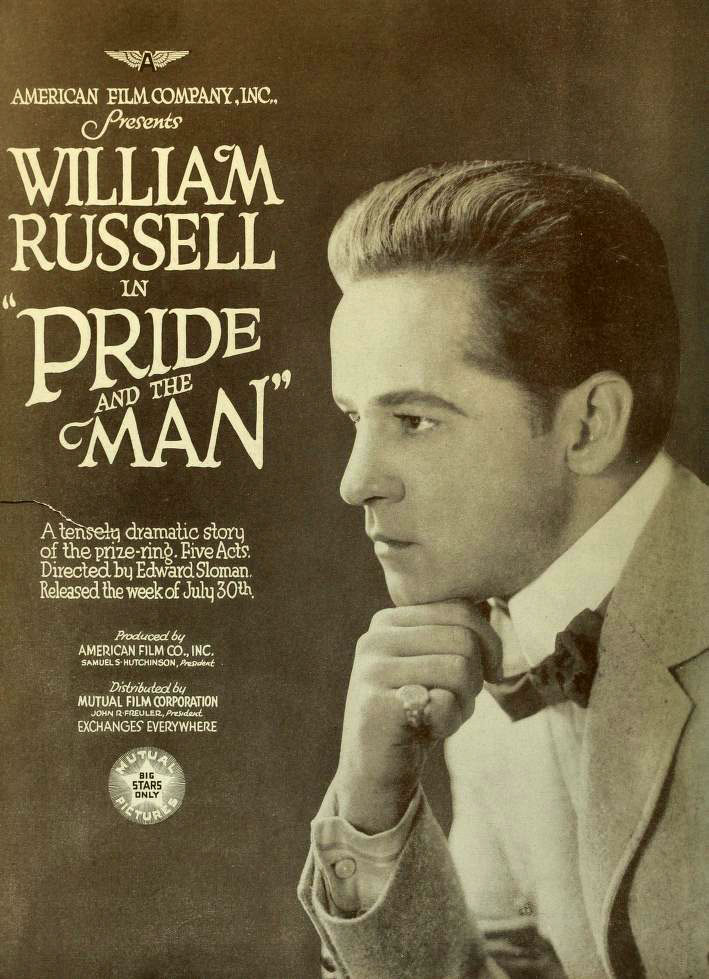
Pride and the Man (1917)

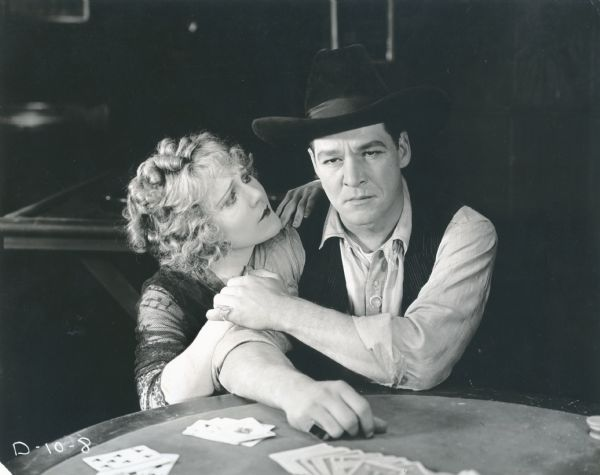
Louise Lovely and William Russell in a scene still for the 1920 Fox production The Twins of Suffering Creek

=== Actor ===
- A Doll's House (1911; short film)
- The Railroad Builder (1911)
- The Colonel and the King (1911)
- The Higher Law (1911)
- David Copperfield (1911) as Ham Peggotty (in part two)
- Put Yourself in His Place (1912) as Squire Raby
- The Little Girl Next Door (1912) as The Other Father
- The Star of Bethlehem (1912)
- Some Fools There Were (1913)
- For Her Boy's Sake (1913)
- Curfew Shall Not Ring Tonight (1913)
- Some Fools There Were (1913) as Second Unsuspecting Bachelor
- The Caged Bird (1913) as The Farmer
- The Dilemma (1914)
- The Straight Road (1914)
- Under the Gaslight (1914) as Ray Trafford
- The Dancing Girl (1915) as John Christison
- The Diamond from the Sky (1915) as Blair Stanley
- The Garden of Lies (1915)
- Sequel to the Diamond from the Sky (1916) as Arthur
- The Thoroughbred (1916) as Kelso Hamilton
- The Smugglers of Santa Cruz (1916)
- The Craving (1916) as Foster Calhoun
- The Bruiser (1916) as "Big Bill" Brawley
- Soul Mates (1916; also director) as Lowell Sherman
- The Highest Bid (1916; also director) as Oliver Strong
- The Strength of Donald McKenzie (1916; also director) as Donald McKenzie
- The Man Who Would Not Die (1916; also director) as Clyde Kingsley/Ward Kingsley
- The Torch Bearer (1916; also director) as John Huntley-Knox
- The Love Hermit (1916) as Tom Weston
- The Twinkler (1916) as Bob Stephany
- My Fighting Gentleman (1917) as Frank Carlisle
- New York Luck (1917)
- The Sea Master (1917)
- Pride and the Man (1917; also screenwriter) as Jack Hastings
- All the World to Nothing (1918)
- Hobbs in a Hurry (1918)
- Up Romance Road (1918)
- Hearts or Diamonds? (1918; also producer) as Larry Hanrahan
- Brass Buttons (1919)
- Six Feet Four (1919)
- This Hero Stuff (1919)
- Some Liar (1919)
- The Lincoln Highwayman (1919) as Jimmy Clunder
- Where the West Begins (1919)
- Twins of Suffering Creek (1920) as Bill Lark
- The Iron Rider (1920)
- The Challenge Of The Law (1920)
- The Valley of Tomorrow (1920)
- The Lady from Longacre (1921)
- The Cheater Reformed (1921)
- Colorado Pluck (1921)
- Desert Blossoms (1921)
- Bare Knuckles (1921)
- Singing River (1921)
- A Self-Made Man (1922)
- Mixed Faces (1922)
- The Men of Zanzibar (1922)
- Strength of the Pines (1922)
- Boston Blackie (1923) as Boston Blackie
- Anna Christie (1923) as Matt Burke
- Man's Size (1923)
- Good-By Girls! (1923)
- The Beloved Brute (1924)
- On Thin Ice (1925)
- The Way of a Girl (1925) as Brand
- My Neighbor's Wife (1925) as Eric von Greed
- Big Pal (1925; also producer)
- Before Midnight (1925)
- The Still Alarm (1926)
- The Blue Eagle (1926) as "Big Tim" Ryan
- Wings of the Storm (1926)
- The Desired Woman (1927) as Captain Maxwell
- The Girl from Chicago (1927) as Big Steve Drummond
- Brass Knuckles (1927) as 'Brass Knuckles' Lamont
- State Street Sadie (1928) as the Bat
- Woman Wise (1928)
- Danger Patrol (1928)
- The Head of the Family (1928)
- Girls Gone Wild (1929) as Dan Brown
