= Marie Osborne Yeats =

American actress (1911–2010)

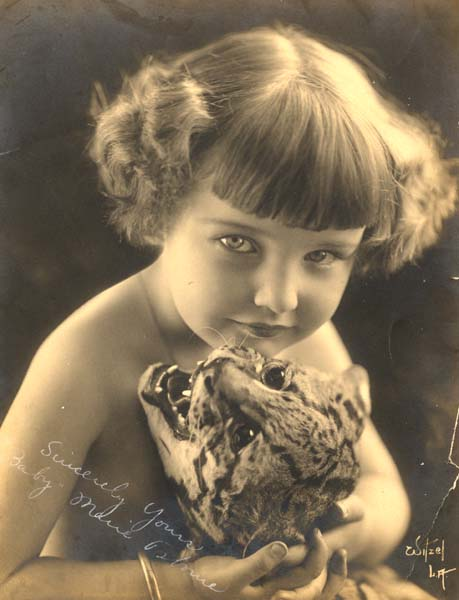
- Osborne in 1918
- Born: Helen Alice Myres; November 5, 1911; Denver, Colorado, U.S.
- Died: November 11, 2010 (aged 99); San Clemente, California, U.S.
- Occupations: Actress; film stand-in; Hollywood costumer
- Years active: 1914–1977
- Spouses: Frank J. Dempsey (m. 1931; div. 1936) Murray F. Yeats (m. 1945; died 1975)

Marie Osborne Yeats (born Helen Alice Myres; November 5, 1911 – November 11, 2010), credited as Baby Marie between 1914 and 1919, was an American actress who was the first major child star of American silent films. She was one of the three major American child stars of the Hollywood silent film era along with Jackie Coogan and Diana Serra Cary. As an adult, from 1934 until 1950, and now billed as Marie Osborne, she continued in film productions, although she appeared only in uncredited roles. In the 1950s, after retiring from the acting profession, she carved out a second career as a costume designer for Hollywood film.

== Life and career ==
=== Early life and child star ===
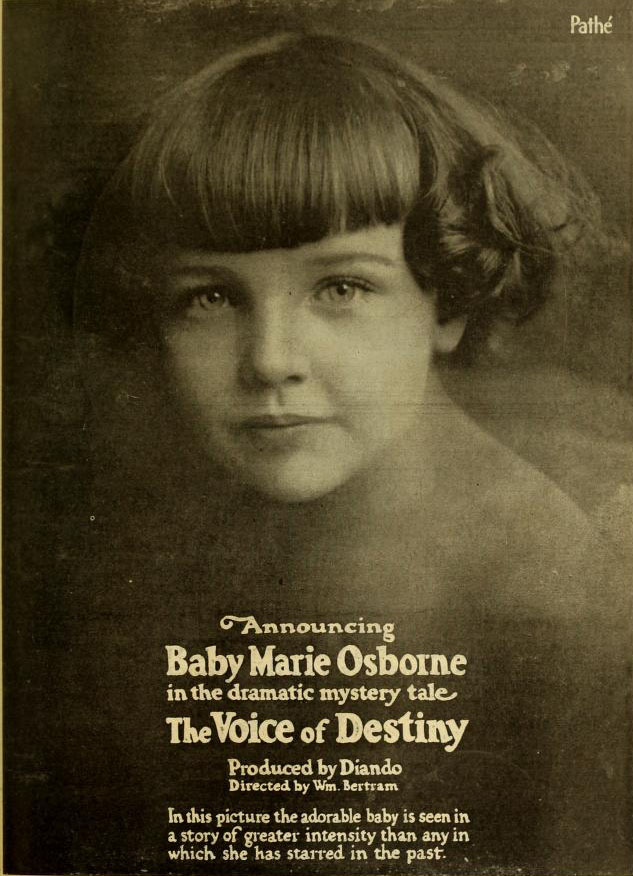
The Voice of Destiny (1918)

Osborne was born as Helen Alice Myres in Denver, Colorado, the daughter of Roy and Mary Myres. She soon became — under mysterious circumstances — the child of Leon and Edith Osborn, who called her Marie and added the "e" to the surname, apparently to obscure the adoption. Her foster parents, the Osbornes, introduced their daughter to silent films when they left Colorado to work at Balboa Studios in Long Beach, California. Osborne made her debut credited as Baby Osbourne in 1914's short drama film Kidnapped in New York.

She was signed to a lucrative contract with Balboa Films (and working with director Henry King and writer Clara Beranger), by the age of five she was starring in silent films, including her best-remembered movie, Little Mary Sunshine, from 1916, one of her few surviving films. Some of her other films are Maid of the Wild (1915), Sunshine and Gold (1917), What Baby Forgot (1917), Daddy's Girl (1918), The Locked Heart (1918), Winning Grandma (1918), The Sawdust Doll (1919), and Daddy Number Two (1919).

At the age of eight, she completed her final film as a child star, Miss Gingersnap in 1919. In all, she was featured or starred in 29 films in a six-year period. Most of her films were produced at Diando Studios, the former Kalem Movie Studio in Glendale, California.

=== Later films ===
As an adult, she returned to motion pictures 15 years later in 1934 – at the request of director Henry King – to appear in his film Carolina, starring Janet Gaynor and Lionel Barrymore. This movie also featured future child star Shirley Temple in a minor role. Over the next 16 years, Osborne worked as a film extra, also serving as a stand-in for actresses such as Ginger Rogers, Deanna Durbin, and Betty Hutton. After appearing in more than a dozen films, she made her last on-screen appearance in Bunco Squad (1950), starring Robert Sterling and Joan Dixon.

=== Costumer ===
In the 1950s, she started a new career as a costumer for Western Costume, a clothing supplier for the motion picture industry. Osborne worked on the wardrobes for such films as Around the World in 80 Days (1956), How to Murder Your Wife (1965), The Godfather: Part II (1974), and Harry and Walter Go to New York (1976). In 1963, Osborne worked as a special costumer for Elizabeth Taylor in the big-budget film Cleopatra. Osborne retired in 1977, and moved to San Clemente, California.

=== Personal life and death ===
Osborne married Frank J. Dempsey on May 2, 1931. Dempsey was the father of Osborne's only child, Joan (born May 13, 1932). They divorced in 1937. Osborne married 36-year-old actor Murray F. Yeats on June 14, 1945, and moved to Sepulveda, California. They remained married until his death on January 27, 1975.

Marie Osborne Yeats died in San Clemente, California, on November 11, 2010, shortly after she celebrated her 99th birthday with her family. Marie, her daughter Joan, and her son-in-law Donald were laid to rest at Mission San Luis Rey. Donald and Joan Young are survived by their five children: Mark, Gary, Brian, Joyce, and Karen.
