= Balboa Amusement Producing Company =

American film production company, 1913–1918

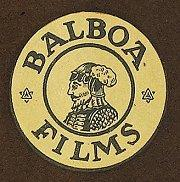

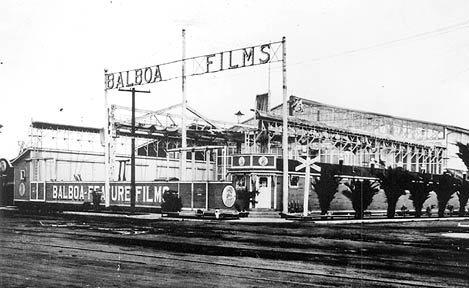
- An image of the studio
- Industry: Film
- Founded: April 1913
- Defunct: 1918

The Balboa Amusement Producing Company (also known as Balboa Studios, and Balboa Feature Film Company) was a film production company in Long Beach, California, from 1913 to 1918 that produced more than 1000 films, around 90% of which have been lost.

Some of the notable silent film stars who worked at the studios during this time are Fatty Arbuckle and Buster Keaton. Charlie Chaplin also made three visits to the studios to visit Arbuckle's film shoots and to study studio management for his newly formed United Artists company.

== History ==
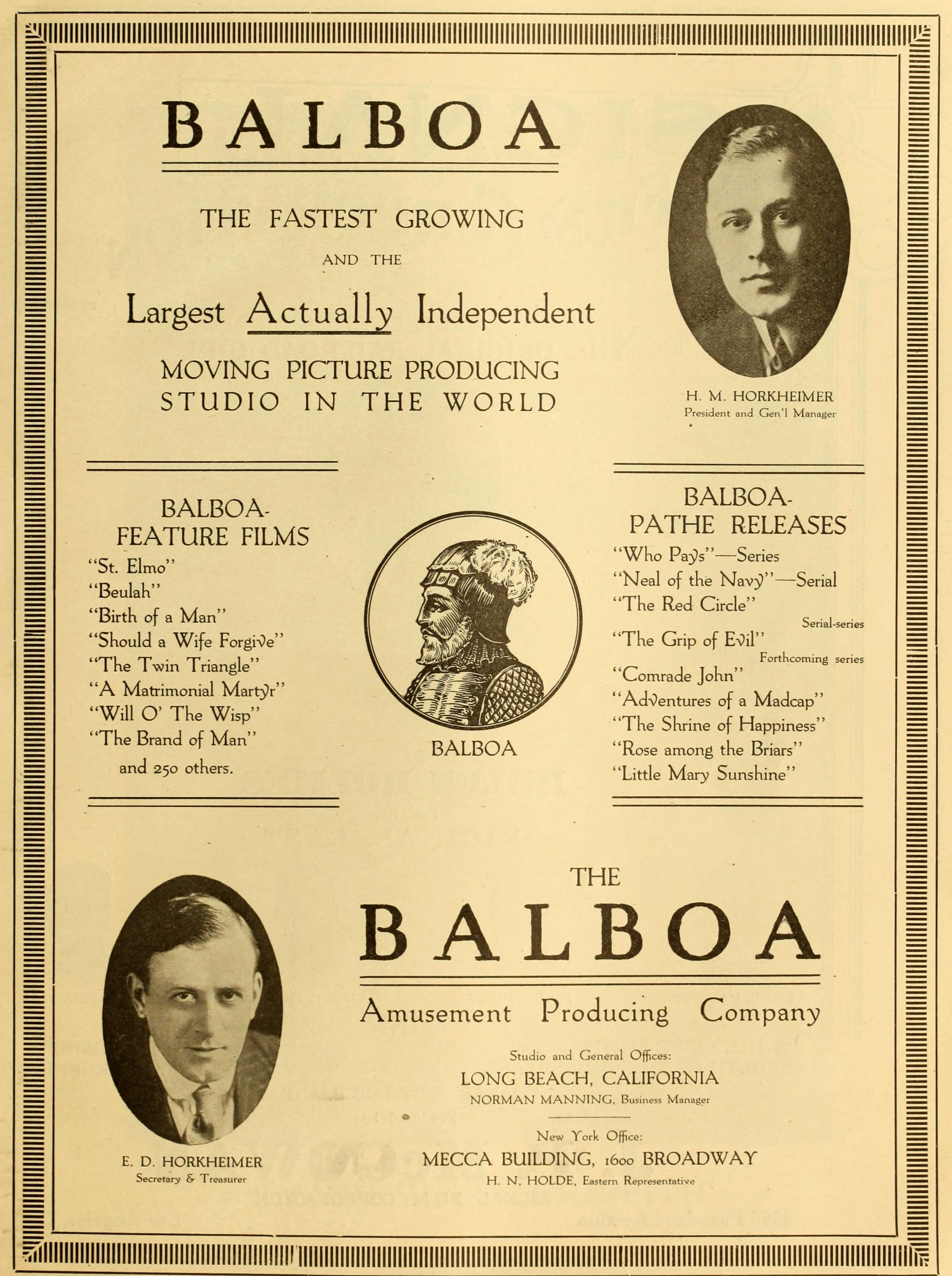
H. M. and E. D. Horkheimer in a 1916 advertisement for Balboa Studios

In 1910, the California Motion Picture Manufacturing Company built the first movie studio in the city of Long Beach. This was also the first studio west of Chicago, since the hub of film-making at that time was in New York. In April 1913, H. M. Horkheimer (along with his brother, Elwood) invested their inheritance in the purchase of the studio built by the California Motion Picture Manufacturing Company at the corner of 6th Street and Alamitos Ave. This became the center of their Balboa Amusement Producing Company.

=== Jack London ===
A contract between Balboa and Jack London was signed on April 28, 1913, allowing the studio to make film adaptations of his novels. In the beginning of August, Variety announced a contract between the Bosworth Company and Jack London to produce film versions of London's novels. The first release would be The Sea Wolf. The Balboa company would advertise that they would be the first to release the film and announced their own version of The Sea Wolf and several other adaptations of London's works. In an article in Motion Picture News in which Hobart Bosworth stated the production would be ready by October 1 and there is no reason to doubt the contract between Bosworth and London. The publication received a telegram from Jack London confirmed that Balboa's contract had lapsed because of a failure to produce four films by the stipulated date. London also stated that the first film had not even been completed by this point. When the matter was taken to court, the federal judge in Los Angeles refused to grant an injunction on Balboa's three reel version of the film and H. M. Horkheimer was considering suing for damages by Bosworth. The judge allowed the case to be re-opened and the Authors' League of America announced a desire to take it to the United States Supreme Court if necessary. London won the case and influenced the United States Congress to change the copyright law in the writer's favor.

== Filmography ==
- The Sea Wolf (1913), pulled from theaters after Jack London sued
- St. Elmo (1914)
- Joy and the Dragon (1916)
- Little Mary Sunshine (1916)
- The Sultana (1916)
- The Stolen Play (1917)
- The Devil's Bait (1917)
- Alien Blood (1917)
- The Wildcat (1917)
- The Neglected Wife (1917)
- Vengeance of the Dead (1917)

== See also ==
- Henry King (director)
- The Sea Wolf (1913 film), a 1913 Lubin Manufacturing Company film

== Bibliography ==
- Burnett, Claudine (5 February 2013). Prohibition Madness: Life and Death in and Around Long Beach, California, 1920-1933. AuthorHouse. p. 254. ISBN 978-1-4772-9162-7.
- Goodrich, Glen (2005). Long Beach Fire Department. Arcadia Publishing. p. 27. ISBN 978-0-7385-3001-7.
- Grobaty, Tim (2012). Location Filming in Long Beach. The History Press. p. 12. ISBN 978-1-60949-740-8.
- Jura, Jean-Jacques; Bardin, Rodney Norman (1999). Balboa Films: A History and Filmography of the Silent Film Studio. McFarland & Company. ISBN 0-7864-0496-5.
- Lemoine, Thierry (2001). Balboa Studios: A Filmography.
- Slide, Anthony (25 February 2014). The New Historical Dictionary of the American Film Industry. Routledge. p. 112. ISBN 978-1-135-92554-3.
