= Sherwood MacDonald =

American film director

- Born: June 30, 1880; New York, New York, United States
- Died: January 25, 1968 (aged 87); Canoga Park, California, United States
- Occupation: Director
- Years active: 1914–1926 (film)

Sherwood MacDonald (June 30, 1880 – January 25, 1968) was an American film director of the silent era. He worked for studios such as Mutual Film, Pathe Exchange and FBO Pictures. He made several films with the child actress Gloria Joy. He directed the 1915 serial The Red Circle.

== Selected filmography ==
- The Red Circle (1915)
- The Sultana (1916)
- The Matrimonial Martyr (1916)
- Sold at Auction (1917)
- The Wildcat (1917)
- Bab the Fixer (1917)
- Sunny Jane (1917)
- No Children Wanted (1918)
- Muggsy (1919)
- Cold Steel (1921)
- The Girl from Rocky Point (1922)

== Bibliography ==
- Slide, Anthony. The New Historical Dictionary of the American Film Industry. Routledge, 2014.
