= General Film Company =

American film distribution company

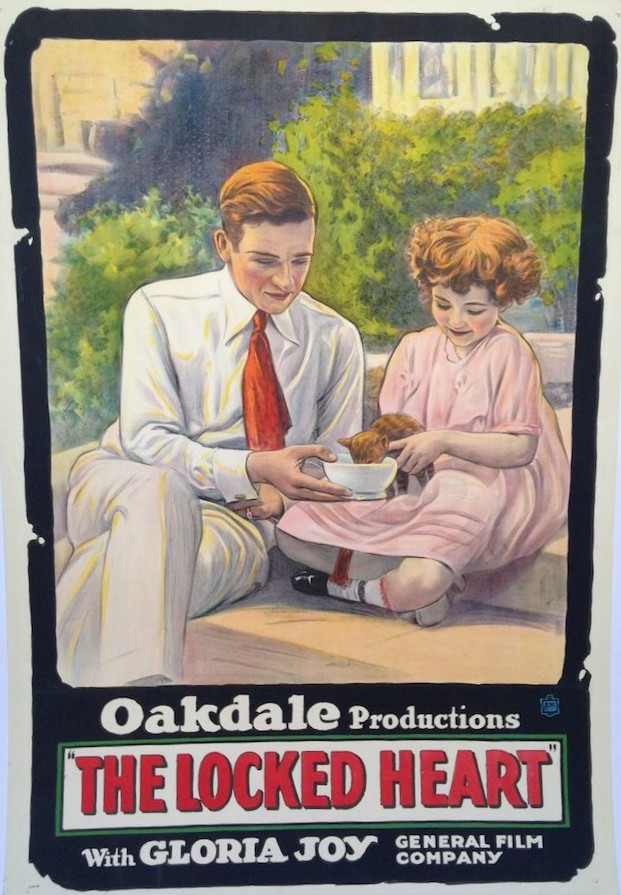
Poster for The Locked Heart (1918), starring child actress Gloria Joy and the film's director, Henry King

The General Film Company was a motion picture distribution company in the United States. Between 1909 and 1920, the company distributed almost 12,000 silent era motion pictures. It was created as part of the Edison Trust to monopolize film distribution. (Note: General Film Company should not be confused with General Film Laboratories, which was formed in 1953 as a film processing company in the Hollywood area.)

== Formation ==
The General Film Company was formed by the Motion Picture Patents Company (MPPC) in an attempt to monopolize distribution. In 1909, the General Film Company tried to seize the equipment of independent distribution companies to discourage their activities.

== Conflict ==
Using their control over several film patents, the General Film Company and MPPC tried to force independent distribution companies to sell out or lose their patent licenses. Competing organizations, such as the Motion Picture Distributing and Sales Company, the National Independent Moving Picture Alliance and the Film Service Association, emerged to challenge the trust. By 1912, the power of the General Film Company had declined and the U.S. Justice Department started prosecution of the MPPC and the General Film Company under the Sherman Act.

== Sold ==
On March 30, 1918, the General Film Company was sold, along with the MPPC, to the Lincoln & Parker Film Company of Worcester, Massachusetts. Thomas Edison reacquired these assets when the Lincoln & Parker Company went bankrupt and sold them to producer Robert L. Giffen in October 1919.
