= Below the Deadline =

Below the Deadline may refer to:

- Below the Deadline (1913 short), a 1913 American silent crime short film
- Below the Deadline (1921 film), a 1921 American silent crime film
- Below the Deadline (1929 film), a 1929 American silent crime film
- Below the Deadline (1936 film), a 1936 American film
- Below the Deadline (1946 film), a 1946 American crime film
