= No More Women =

No More Women may refer to:

- No More Women (1934 film), an American pre-Code adventure film
- No More Women (1924 film), an American silent comedy film
- No More Women, a game on the British television panel game We Need Answers
