= Tiger Man =

Tiger Man or Tigerman may refer to:

== Folklore ==
- Keibu Keioiba, a half tiger, half human in Meitei mythology and folklore

== Fiction ==
- The Tiger Man, a 1918 American Western silent film by William S. Hart
- Tiger-Man, an Atlas/Seaboard Comics superhero
- Tiger-Man (DC Comics), three different characters from DC Comics
- Tiger Man, a character in the TV series Buck Rogers in the 25th Century
- Tigerman, a 2014 novel by Nick Harkaway

== Music ==
- Tiger Man (album), by Elvis Presley, 1998
- "Tiger Man" (song), by Rufus Thomas, 1953; covered by Elvis Presley, 1968
- "Tigerman", a song by Goldfrapp from Silver Eye, 2017
- "Tigerman", a song by Teddybears STHLM from Rock 'n' Roll Highschool, 2000

== People ==
- Gunther Gebel-Williams (1934–2001), trainer of tigers
- Kailash Sankhala (1925–1994), Indian naturalist and conservationist
- The Legendary Tigerman (fl. 21st century), Paulo Furtado, Portuguese blues performer
- Stalking Cat (1958–2012), an American who underwent body modification to resemble a tiger
- Stanley Tigerman (1930–2019), American architect
