= When the Clouds Roll By =

1919 film by Victor Fleming, Theodore Reed

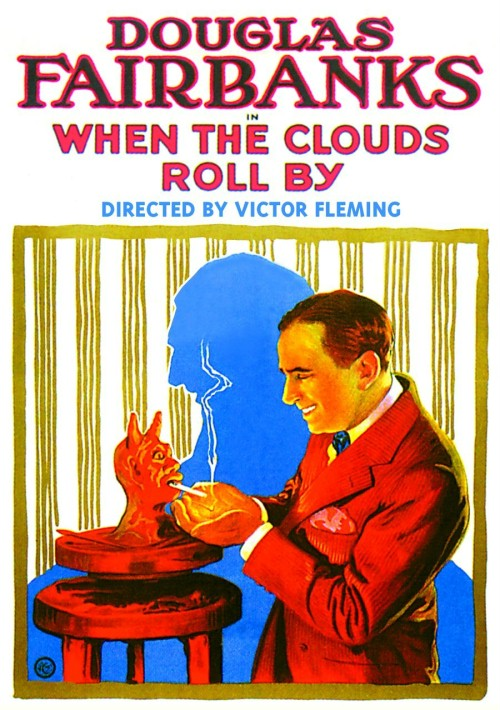
- Theatrical poster
- Directed by: Victor Fleming; Theodore Reed (uncredited)
- Written by: Douglas Fairbanks (story); T. J. G. (scenario); Lewis Weadon (uncredited)
- Produced by: Douglas Fairbanks
- Starring: Douglas Fairbanks
- Cinematography: William McGann; Harry Thorpe
- Distributed by: United Artists
- Release date: December 28, 1919
- Running time: 75 minutes
- Country: United States

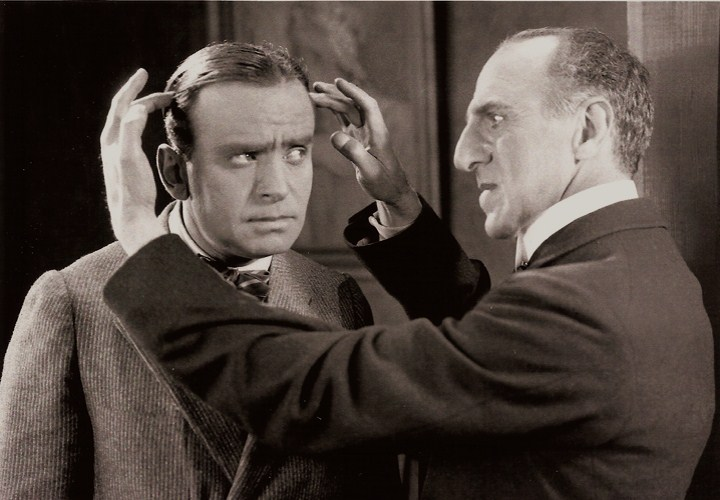
Douglas Fairbanks and Herbert Grimwood

The full film

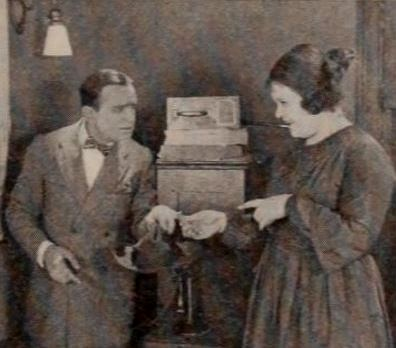
Douglas Fairbanks and unidentified actress (more than likely Babe London)

When the Clouds Roll By is a 1919 American comedy film starring Douglas Fairbanks and directed by Victor Fleming and Theodore Reed. After decades of not being seen by the public, the film was finally released in 2010 on DVD by Alpha Video with an original score by Don Kinnier.

== Plot ==
As described in a film magazine, Daniel Boone Brown (Douglas Fairbanks), a superstitious but ambitious young New Yorker, is the victim of demented psychiatrist Dr. Ulrich Metz (Herbert Grimwood) who, with the aid of numberless associates serving him in the interests of science, arranges circumstances intended to drive Daniel to suicide. In the midst of a series of bewildering misfortunes apparently emanating from broken mirrors, black cats, and similar sources, Daniel meets Greenwich Village artist Lucette Bancroft (Kathleen Clifford), and mutual love results. A Westerner who owns land in partnership with Lucette's father comes to the city and plots with Daniel's uncle Curtis (Ralph Lewis) to defraud his partner. Daniel, after being driven to the verge of suicide by the scientist and his aides, is saved when it is discovered that Dr. Metz is insane. Daniel then follows the Westerner, who has convinced Lucette to return to the west with him, when a flood engulfs the train they are riding on. Daniel brings about a happy resolution.

== Cast ==
- Douglas Fairbanks as Daniel Boone Brown
- Kathleen Clifford as Lucette Bancroft
- Frank Campeau as Mark Drake
- Ralph Lewis as Curtis Brown
- Daisy Jefferson as Bobby De Vere
- Bull Montana as The Nightmare
- Herbert Grimwood as Dr. Ulrich Metz
- Albert MacQuarrie as Hobson
- Victor Fleming as himself
- Thomas J. Geraghty as himself (credited as T. J. G.)
- William C. McGann as himself
- Harris Thorpe as himself
- Babe London as Switchboard Operator (uncredited)

== Reception ==
Fairbanks biographer Jeffrey Vance considers When the Cloud Rolls By to be the "best of all the contemporary Fairbanks comedies." "Executed at a breathless pace, When the Clouds Roll By is a masterful showpiece for the whirling cyclone of energy that was Douglas Fairbanks." Vance's highest praise is for the elaborate dream sequence, which he deems "a virtual encapsulation of every gymnastic feat in the Fairbanks repertoire" and notes that Fairbanks's walk on the ceiling of his home anticipates the celebrated "dancing on the ceiling" sequence in Stanley Donen's Royal Wedding (1951). Vance also notes that the film's flood sequence conclusion presages a similar ending in Buster Keaton's classic Steamboat Bill, Jr. (1928).

The film is recognized by American Film Institute in these lists:

- 2002: AFI's 100 Years...100 Passions – Nominated
