= Through Eyes of Men =

1920 film by Charles A. Taylor

- Directed by: Charles A. Taylor
- Written by: Charles A. Taylor
- Starring: Frank Mayo; Prudence Lyle; George Gebhardt
- Cinematography: William E. Fildew; B. L. James
- Production company: Radin Pictures
- Distributed by: States Rights
- Release date: June 1920 (US)
- Running time: 5 reels
- Country: United States
- Language: English

Through Eyes of Men, also occasionally stylized as Thru Eyes of Men, is a lost 1920 American silent drama film directed by Charles A. Taylor and starring Frank Mayo, Prudence Lyle, and George Gebhardt. It was released in June 1920.

== Cast list ==
- Frank Mayo as Franklyn Allen
- Prudence Lyle as Leila Leighton
- George Gebhardt as Berkaro
- Claire McDowell as Mrs. Virginia Allen
- Ben Alexander as Little Billy
- Dell Boone as Alice Weston

== Preservation ==
With no holdings located in archives, Through Eyes of Men is considered a lost film.
