= Una Fleming =

American dancer (1899–1966)

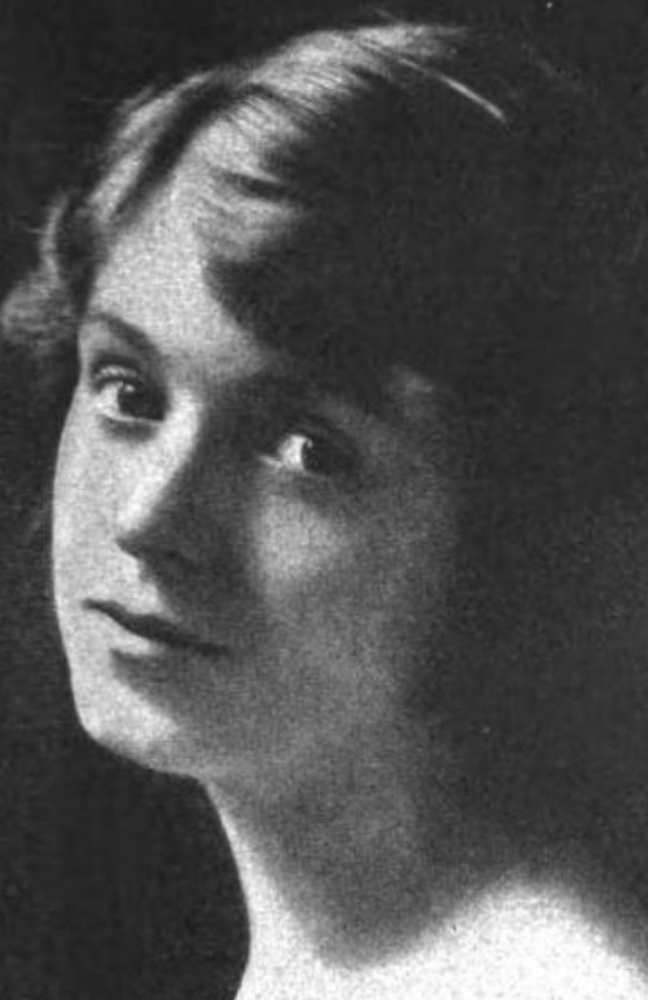
- Una Fleming, from a 1919 publication
- Born: Marian Una Strain; 1899; California
- Died: October 26, 1966 (age 67); Ridgewood, New Jersey
- Other names: Una F. Adams, Una F. Wood, Una F. Glassell
- Occupations: Dancer, actress
- Spouse: Freeman Wood

Marian Una Strain Fleming Adams (1899 – October 26, 1966), known on stage as Una Fleming, was an American dancer and actress on Broadway.

== Early life and education ==
Una Strain was raised in Los Angeles, by her mother Carrie B. Malcolm Strain Fleming, and her stepfather, A. F. Fleming. Her Irish-born father John Strain died in 1904. She attended the Egan School of Music and Drama in Los Angeles, and studied dance with Matildita Fernandez. She danced at public events from her early teens, and was crowned the Queen of May at May Day festivities in Los Angeles in 1914. In 1915, she joined a vaudeville dancing act. In 1916, she was premiere danseuse in the ballet of the California Grand Opera Company.

== Career ==
Fleming appeared in the silent film The Talk of the Town (1918). On Broadway, she was a dancer in The Velvet Lady (1919), The Sweetheart Shop (1920) and Her Family Tree (1921). She also danced in vaudeville programs in New York.

Theatre critic Burns Mantle described Fleming as dancing "with such unusual grace", and considered her part of a trend for "'plain American girl' dancers" who were cast in specialty roles once only assigned to foreign dancers. McClure's Magazine also placed her among other young women dancers in a photo feature in 1919, with the comment that "she seems to be fashioned mostly out of chiffon and grace".

Fleming married in 1920. She was still dancing on stage in 1925, with the George M. Cohan show Little Nellie Kelly in Oakland, and in 1926, when she appeared with Gloria Foy and Lou Holtz in Patsy in San Francisco and Los Angeles.

== Personal life ==
Fleming was married four times, to three different husbands. Her first husband was businessman Carleton Adams in 1920; they had a daughter, Barbara. They divorced in 1927, then remarried in 1928, then divorced again in 1935. She married again, to actor Freeman Wood, by 1940. She married a third time, to Gardner T. Glassell, in 1949. Gardner Glassell died in 1958, and she died in 1966, in Ridgewood, New Jersey, at the age of 67.
