= Frank Mayo (film actor) =

American actor (1886–1963)

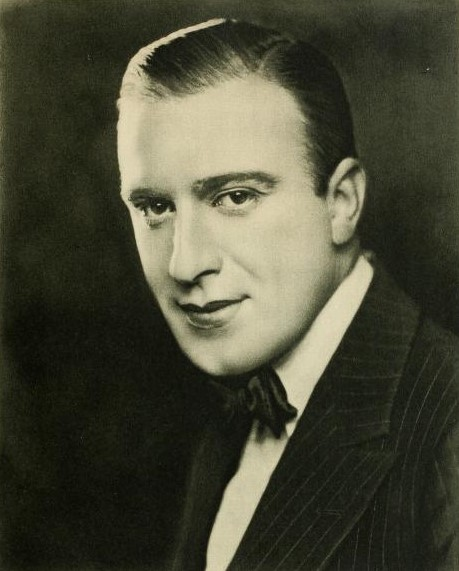
- Mayo in 1924
- Born: Frank Lorimer Mayo; June 28, 1889; New York City, New York, U.S.
- Died: July 9, 1963 (aged 74); Laguna Beach, California, U.S.
- Resting place: Forest Lawn Memorial Park, Hollywood Hills, California, U.S.
- Occupation: Actor
- Years active: 1911–1949
- Spouse: Dagmar Godowsky (m. 1921; ann. 1926)

Frank Lorimer Mayo (June 28, 1889 – July 9, 1963) was an American actor. He appeared in 310 films between 1911 and 1949.

== Biography ==
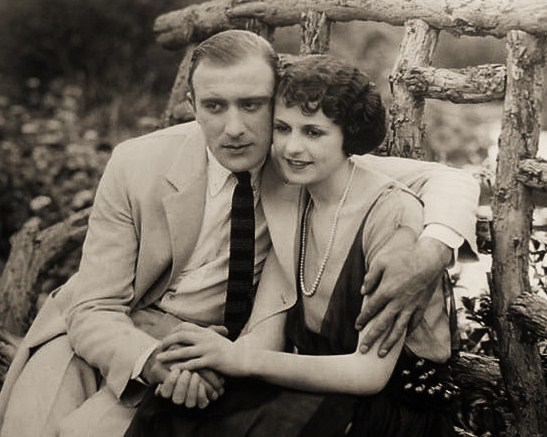
Mayo and Louise Lorraine in The Altar Stairs (1922)

He was born in New York City, the grandson of famous stage actor Frank Mayo, and he died in Laguna Beach, California, from a heart attack.

Frank Mayo's first wife was Joyce Eleanor Moore. He was married to actress Dagmar Godowsky from 1921 to 1926. The marriage was annulled in August 1926 because divorce decree of Frank Mayo and Joyce Moore was never written. He married Margaret Louise Shorey in August, 1928. Mayo was buried at the Forest Lawn, Hollywood Hills Cemetery in Los Angeles.

== Selected filmography ==
- The Red Circle (1915)
- Shadows (1916)
- Sold at Auction (1917)
- The Bronze Bride (1917)
- Easy Money (1917)
- Betsy Ross (1917)
- The Burglar (1917)
- The Purple Lily (1918)
- The Interloper (1918)
- A Soul Without Windows (1918)
- Tinsel (1918)
- The Trap (1918)
- Lasca (1919)
- The Rough Neck (1919)
- The Girl in Number 29 (1920)
- Hitchin' Posts (1920)
- Burnt Wings (1920)
- Through Eyes of Men (1920)
- Colorado (1921)
- The Fighting Lover (1921)
- Dr. Jim (1921)
- The Magnificent Brute (1921)
- The Blazing Trail (1921)
- Tiger True (1921)
- Go Straight (1921)
- The Way Back (1922)
- Across the Dead-Line (1922)
- The Altar Stairs (1922)
- Wolf Law (1922)
- The First Degree (1923)
- Souls for Sale (1923)
- Six Days (1923)
- Wild Oranges (1924)
- The Shadow of the Desert (1924)
- The Plunderer (1924)
- The Triflers (1924)
- Is Love Everything? (1924)
- The Price She Paid (1924)
- Barriers Burned Away (1925)
- Women and Gold (1925)
- The Unknown Lover (1925)
- Passionate Youth (1925)
- Then Came the Woman (1926)
- Range Law (1931)
- Chinatown After Dark (1931)
- The Hawk (1931)
- Alias – the Bad Man (1931)
- Hell's Headquarters (1932)
- The Magnificent Brute (1936)
- The Oklahoma Kid (1939) as Land Agent (uncredited)
- The Roaring Twenties (1939) (uncredited)
- The Wagons Roll at Night (1941)
- Highway West (1941)
- Lady Gangster (1942)
- Yankee Doodle Dandy (1942) as Hotel Clerk (uncredited)
- The Gorilla Man (1943)
- Lake Placid Serenade (1944)
- The Devil's Mask (1946)
- The Strange Mr. Gregory (1946)
