= Makoto Inokuchi =

Japanese actor, writer, and translator

- Born: March 14, 1887; Tokyo, Japan
- Died: ?? ??
- Occupation(s): Actor, writer, translator

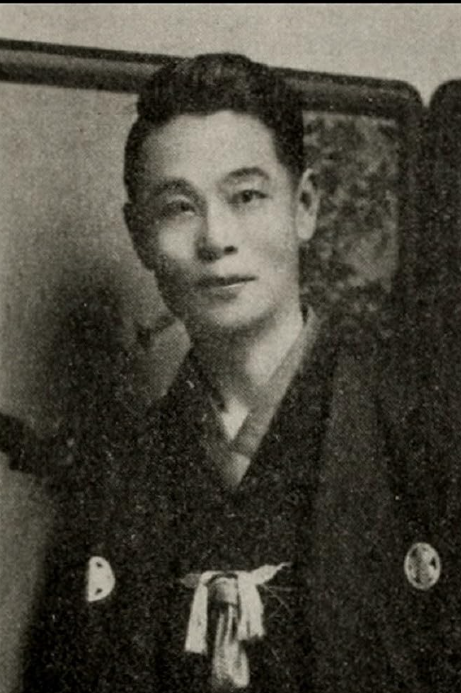
Makoto Inokuchi in 1923

Makoto Inokuchi (sometimes spelled Makato Inokuchi) was a Japanese actor, writer, and translator who rose to prominence as an actor in Hollywood during the silent era.

== Biography ==
Makoto was born in Tokyo in 1887; he eventually moved to the United States and attended Harvard, Princeton, and the University of Chicago. In addition to the string of roles he played on the big screen in the 1910s, he also reportedly translated a number of U.S. novels from English to Japanese, and appeared on the stage in vaudeville. Little is known of what became of him after his last known on-screen appearance in 1917's The Stolen Play, although some reports from 1916 indicated he may have returned to Japan to make films of his own.

== Select filmography ==
- The Stolen Play
- The Better Woman
- Sibyl's Scenario
- The Red Circle
- Officer 666
- The Girl and the Explorer
- Our Mutual Girl (serial)
