= The Law That Divides =

1918 silent film

- Directed by: Howard M. Mitchell
- Starring: Kathleen Clifford; Kenneth Harlan; Gordon Sackville
- Cinematography: Joseph Brotherton
- Production company: Plaza Pictures
- Distributed by: Hodkinson Pictures
- Release date: October 28, 1918
- Running time: 50 minutes
- Country: United States
- Languages: Silent; English intertitles

The Law That Divides is a 1918 American silent drama film directed by Howard M. Mitchell and starring Kathleen Clifford, Kenneth Harlan and Gordon Sackville.

== Cast ==
- Kathleen Clifford as Kathleen Preston
- Kenneth Harlan as Howard Murray
- Gordon Sackville as John Douglas
- Corinne Grant as Mrs. Douglas
- Patrick Calhoun as Kenneth Douglas
- Scott Pembroke as Jack Baggot
- Ruth Lackaye as Mrs. Baggot
- Mabel Hyde as Mrs. Preston

== Bibliography ==
- John T. Weaver. Twenty Years of Silents, 1908-1928. Scarecrow Press, 1971.
