= Nelson Wheatcroft =

English actor and drama teacher

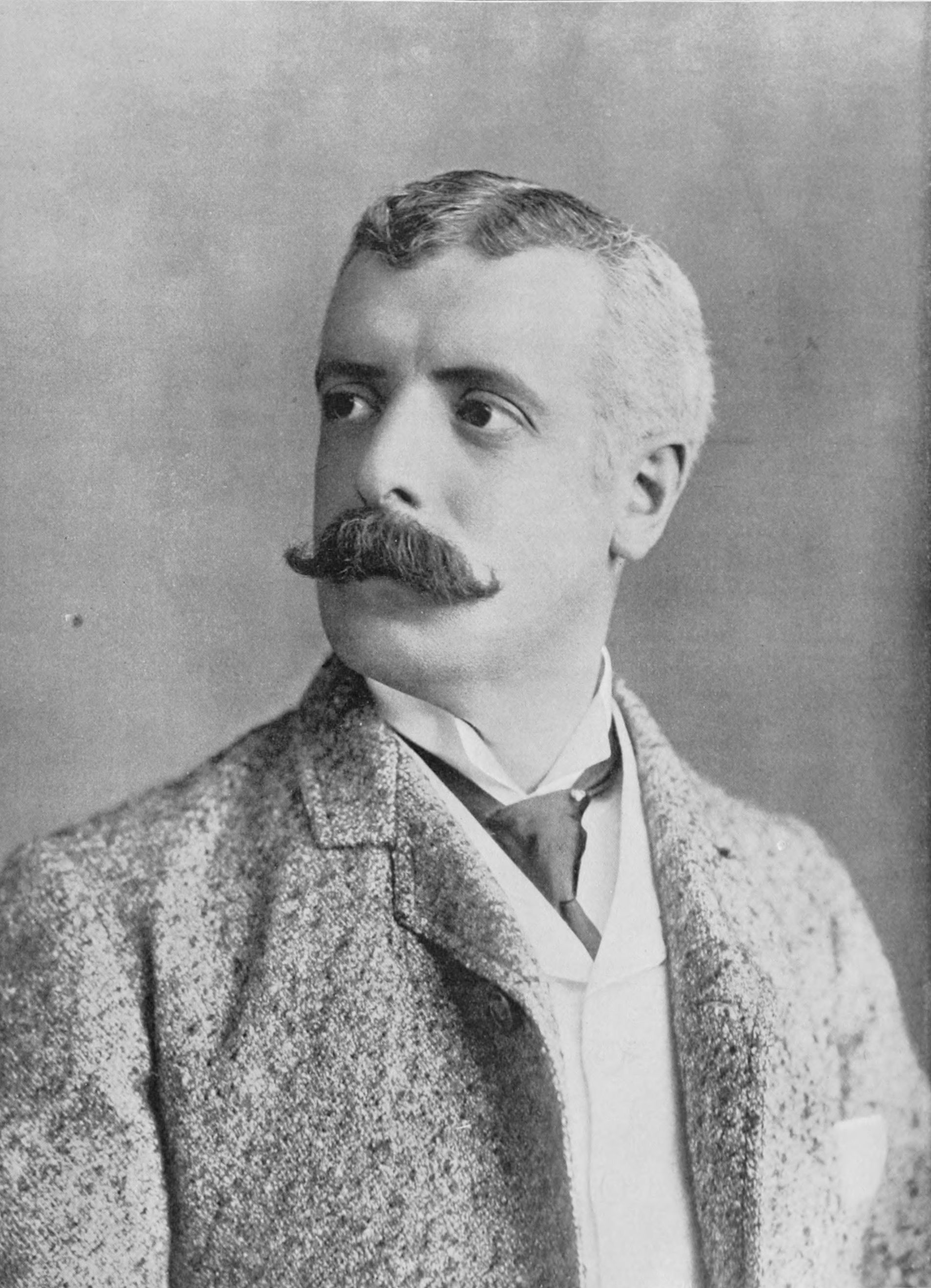
- Born: Christopher Wheatcroft; February 15, 1852; Greater London, England
- Died: March 3, 1897 (aged 45); Manhattan, New York, US
- Resting place: Woodlawn Cemetery (Bronx, New York)
- Occupations: Actor, drama teacher
- Spouse(s): Jane Elizabeth Rogers (m. 1875) Adeline Stanhope
- Children: Stanhope Wheatcroft (son)

Nelson Wheatcroft (February 15, 1852 – March 3, 1897) was an English-born actor and drama teacher. He ran a famous drama school at the Charles Frohman Empire Theatre in the late Victorian era, and was a member of The Lambs Club. He was married to Adeline Stanhope. Their son Stanhope Wheatcroft was also a silent film actor.

He was born Christopher William Wheatcroft to William Wheatcroft and Emily Susanna Nelson. He changed his first name to his mother's maiden name. He met Jane Elizabeth Rogers in 1875. They had five children of whom two died during infancy. While his family lived in London, Wheatcroft toured the country.

He met Adeline Stanhope, a married woman whose husband was Thomas Amory Sullivan. While Sullivan went to the United States, Nelson and Adeline began a relationship. Sullivan returned from the US and discovered his wife's adultery with Wheatcroft. Stanhope divorced Sullivan in 1882 and married Nelson Wheatcroft in 1886. She had a son with Wheatcroft, Stanhope Wheatcroft.

With his death in 1897, Nelson Wheatcroft had not divorced his first wife, Jane, before marrying Adeline, and thus was called a bigamist.
