= Robert Anderson (actor, born 1890) =

American actor

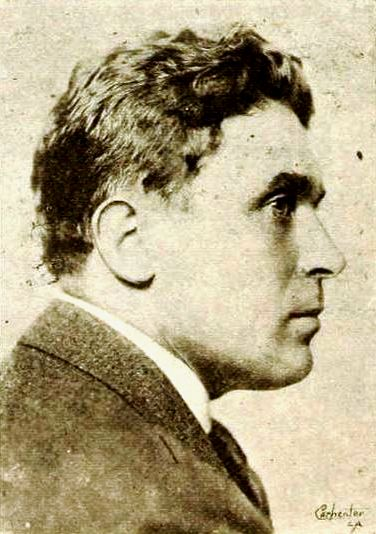
- Moving Picture World, 1919
- Born: Robert Christian Anderson; July 22, 1890; Odense, Denmark
- Died: June 25, 1963 (aged 72); Woodland Hills, California
- Occupation: Actor
- Years active: 1915–1934

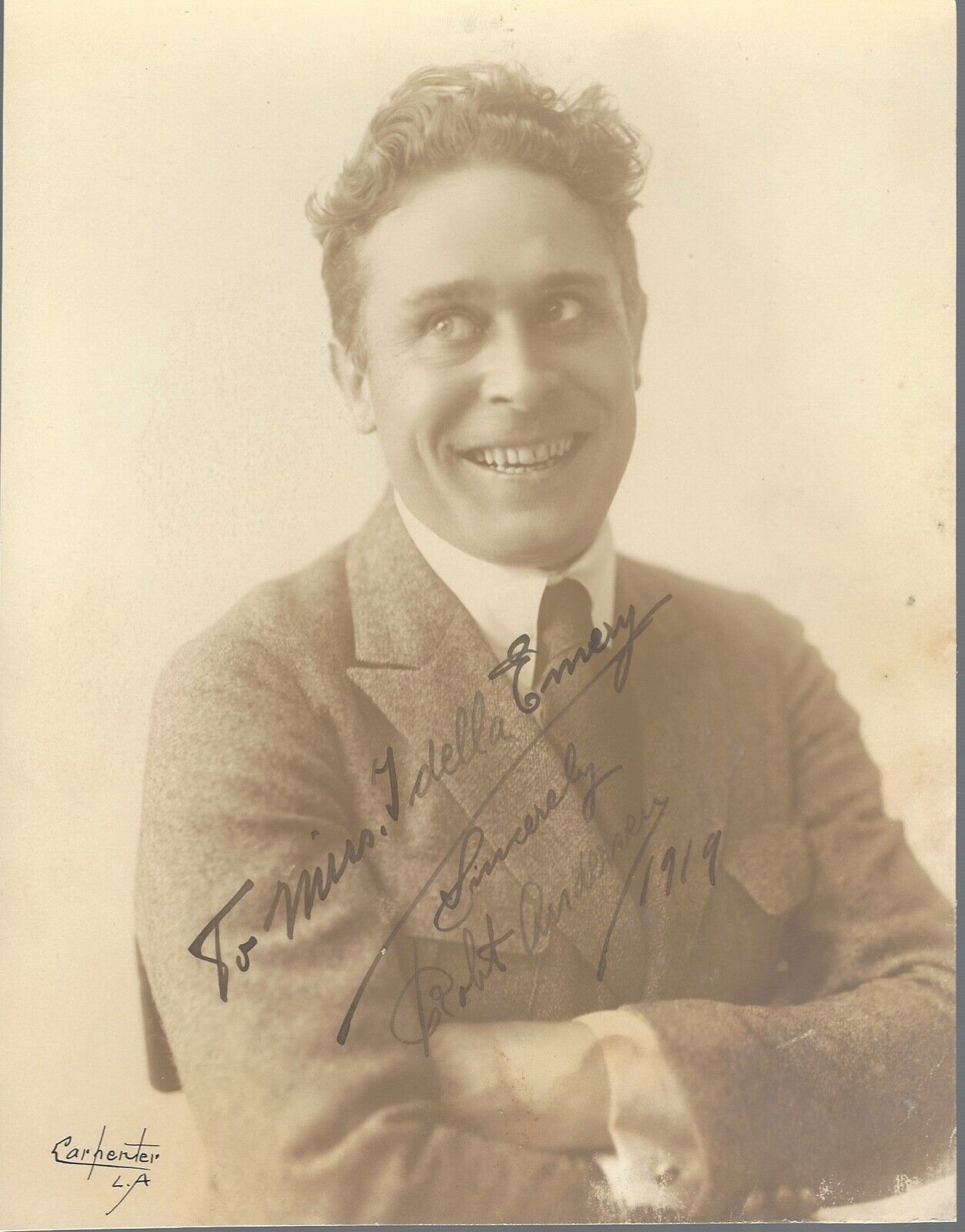
Robert C. Anderson

Robert Christian Anderson (July 22, 1890 – June 25, 1963) was an American actor of Danish birth who appeared in silent films.

== Biography ==
Anderson was born in Odense, Denmark. He was also a make-up artist and director (of one short). Anderson and D.W. Griffith were the principal makeup artists on Griffith's monumental classic Intolerance. He later appeared in Griffith's World War I propaganda film Hearts of the World (1918). In addition to Hearts of the World Anderson can be seen today in surviving silent films such as The Heart of Humanity (1918) another World War I film where he played one of the Patricia brothers. He makes a noteworthy appearance alongside Lionel Barrymore in The Temptress (1926), Greta Garbo's second MGM film.

Anderson's is known for his silent film performance as the villain Sebastian in MGM's White Shadows in the South Seas (1928), lushly filmed in Tahiti and the second film to win an Academy Award for Best Cinematography. The film was directed by W.S. "Woody" Van Dyke and starred Monte Blue as the hero.

Anderson continued in films a few more years after sound arrived, his last film credit being in 1934. He died in 1963.

== Partial filmography ==
- Intolerance (1916)
- Draft 258 (1917)
- Hearts of the World (1918)
- The Heart of Humanity (1918)
- Common Property (1919)
- The Petal on the Current (1919)
- Once to Every Woman (1920)
- Dr. Jim (1921)
- Below the Deadline (1921)
- Tillie (1922)
- The Girl in His Room (1922)
- The Social Buccaneer (1923)
- Slander the Woman (1923)
- The Eternal Struggle (1923)
- The Lullaby (1924)
- The Temptress (1926)
- The Beautiful Cheat (1926)
- Love Me and the World Is Mine (1928)
- White Shadows in the South Seas (1928)
- Clear the Decks (1929)
- Rasputin and the Empress (1932) (*uncredited)
- Treasure Island (1934) (*uncredited)
- The Mighty Barnum (1934) (*uncredited)
