= Richard the Lion-Hearted (1923 film) =

1923 film by Chester Withey

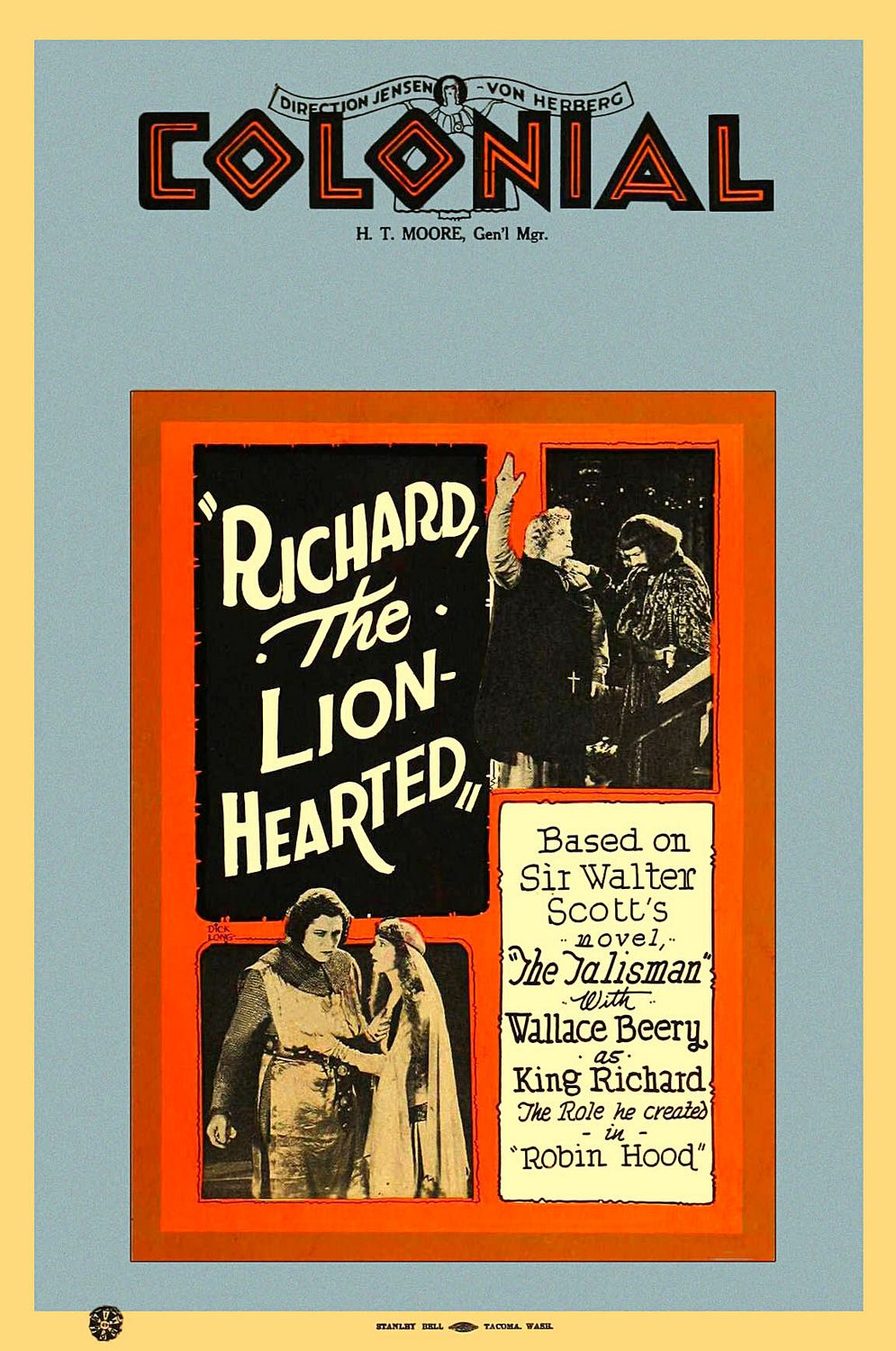
- Directed by: Chester Withey
- Written by: Frank E. Woods
- Based on: The Talisman by Walter Scott
- Produced by: Thompson Buchanan; Elmer Harris
- Starring: Wallace Beery; Charles K. Gerrard; Kathleen Clifford
- Cinematography: Joseph Walker
- Production company: Associated Authors
- Distributed by: Allied Producers
- Release date: October 15, 1923
- Running time: 80 minutes
- Country: United States
- Language: Silent (English intertitles)

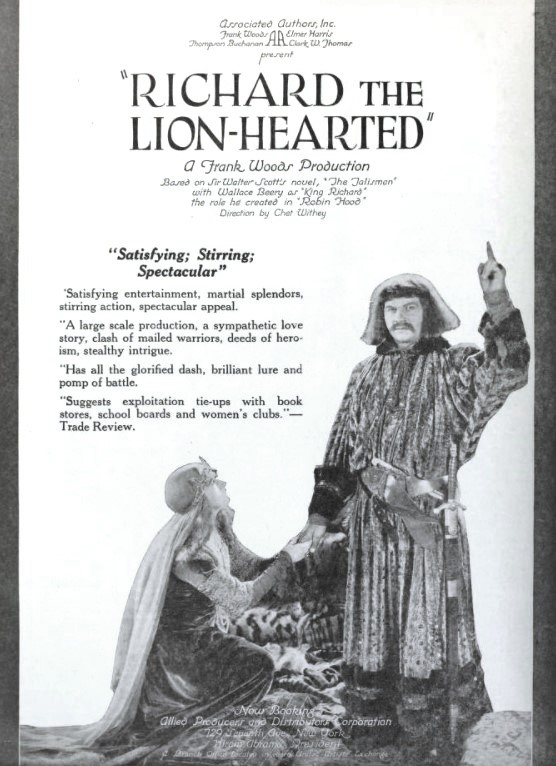
Beery in Richard the Lion-Hearted

Richard the Lion-Hearted is a 1923 American silent historical adventure film directed by Chester Withey and starring Wallace Beery, Charles K. Gerrard and Kathleen Clifford. It is the sequel to Robin Hood (1922; starring Douglas Fairbanks in the title role), with Beery returning as Richard the Lion-Hearted. The film was written by Frank E. Woods and based on the 1825 Sir Walter Scott novel The Talisman.

== Cast ==
- Wallace Beery as Richard the Lion-Hearted
- Charles K. Gerrard as Sultan Saladin
- Kathleen Clifford as Queen Berengaria
- Marguerite De La Motte as Lady Edith Plantagenet
- John Bowers as Sir Kenneth, Knight of the Leopard
- Clarence Geldart as Conrade
- Wilbur Higby as Sir Thomas de Vaux
- Tully Marshall as Archbishop of Tyre
- Melbourne MacDowell as ? (undetermined)

== Preservation ==
A print of Richard the Lion-Hearted is held at the Archives du Film du CNC in Bois d'Arcy.
