= The Talk of the Town (1918 film) =

1918 film

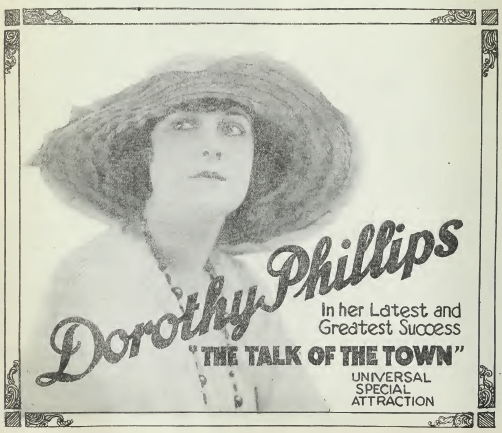
- Dorothy Phillips in film ad
- Directed by: Allen Holubar
- Screenplay by: Allen Holubar
- Based on: Discipline and Genevra; 1917 novelette by Harold Vickers
- Starring: Dorothy Phillips; Lon Chaney; William Stowell
- Cinematography: Fred LeRoy Granville
- Distributed by: Universal Pictures
- Release date: September 28, 1918
- Running time: 6 reels (one hour)
- Country: United States
- Language: Silent (English intertitles)

The Talk of the Town is a 1918 American silent comedy film directed by Allen Holubar and featuring Lon Chaney, William Stowell, and Dorothy Phillips. The screenplay was written by Allen Holubar, based on the novelette "Discipline of Genevra" by Harold Vickers. The Talk of the Town is currently considered a lost film.

By the time this film was released, Chaney had already quit working for Universal Pictures over a salary dispute, and was preparing to appear in the Paramount Pictures western Riddle Gawne.

== Plot ==
Genevra French has been raised strictly by her father Major French, without knowledge of worldly affairs. Using ideas she finds in a book "How to Attract the Opposite Sex", Genevra convinces a family friend, Lawrence Tabor, to marry her and then later tells him that she has married him only so that she may be free of her prison-like upbringing and get a taste of Life. Lawrence is saddened that his wife doesn't love him deeply, but since he loves her, he continues on with their loveless marriage.

She becomes attracted to a worthless playboy named Jack Lanchome and asks her husband to introduce him to her. Lawrence refuses to introduce his wife to such a ne'er-do-well, but Lanchome secretly invites Genevra to have dinner with him alone in a seedy cafe. After they eat, Lanchome locks the door and attempts to rape her, but her husband arrives just in time to save her from the scoundrel's amorous advances. Genevra is impressed by her husband's courage and suddenly she realizes that she really does love him. She begs her husband to take her home and swears she will be a good wife from now on, and never disobey him again.

The following day, Lawrence meets Lanchome in his office and attempts to pay him for the act he put on to scare Genevra straight, but Lanchome refuses the check and says "That was the first nice thing I've done for anyone in a long time. I can't accept payment." Buoyed by his good feelings about himself, Lanchome later joins the Army and goes overseas to fight in the war. Genevra never learns that the entire "attempted rape" scene at the cafe was just a set-up designed to scare her straight.

== Cast ==
- Dorothy Phillips as Genevra French
- William Stowell as Lawrence Tabor
- Lon Chaney as Jack Lanchome (Langhorne in some sources)
- George Fawcett as Major French
- Clarissa Selwynne as Aunt Harriet
- Gloria Joy as Genevra at age 5
- Charles Hill Mailes
- ZaSu Pitts
- Katherine Griffith
- William Burgess
- W. H. Bainbridge
- George Lewis
- Norman Kerry
- Una Fleming (dancer)

== Reception ==
The film received positive reviews from several critics upon the time of release. A critic for Wid's Film Daily wrote "This is going to register with a bang with most folks. It gets nearly naughty several times, and some incidents have been rather broadly dealt with." Motion Picture News wrote "People like happy pictures these days, especially productions in which there is interest along with the happiness. A good line to use in your advertising is "It is a happy picture.". Another critic from Variety wrote, "There is a strong vein of humor through the whole picture, otherwise it would be hopelessly uninteresting...The photography is sharp and clear and the settings are in keeping with the story."

== Censorship ==
Like many American films of the time, The Talk of the Town was subject to cuts by city and state film censorship boards. For example, the Chicago Board of Censors required a cut, in Reel 2, of four intertitles "Perhaps we should tell Genevra everything", "Genevra will learn of life when she marries", "And instead of a beautiful thing, nature becomes a hideous, alluring mystery", and "I never pretended to be a saint — you knew what it meant to play with me", first two kissing scenes before young woman locks herself in room, and first two scenes of woman struggling in man's arms in second room.
