= The Locked Heart =

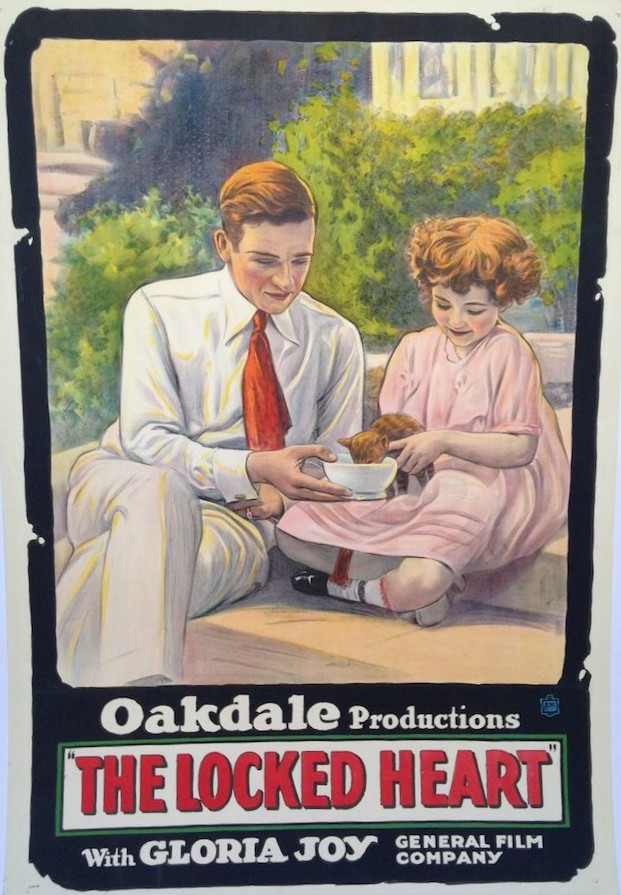
- Directed by: Henry King
- Written by: Daniel F. Whitcomb
- Produced by: E.D. Horkheimer; H.M. Horkheimer
- Starring: Gloria Joy; Vola Vale; Henry King
- Cinematography: George Rizard
- Production company: Balboa Amusement Producing Company
- Distributed by: General Film Company
- Release date: July 20, 1918
- Running time: 50 minutes
- Country: United States
- Languages: Silent; English intertitles

The Locked Heart is a 1918 American silent drama film directed by Henry King and starring King, Gloria Joy, and Vola Vale.

== Cast ==
- Gloria Joy as Martha Mason
- Henry King as Harry Mason
- Vola Vale as Ruth Mason
- Daniel Gilfether as Colonel Mason
- Leon Pardue as The Villain

== Preservation ==
The Locked Heart is currently presumed lost. In February of 2021, the film was cited by the National Film Preservation Board on their Lost U.S. Silent Feature Films list.

== Bibliography ==
- Donald W. McCaffrey & Christopher P. Jacobs. Guide to the Silent Years of American Cinema. Greenwood Publishing, 1999. ISBN 0-313-30345-2
