= Boys Will Be Boys (1921 film) =

1921 film

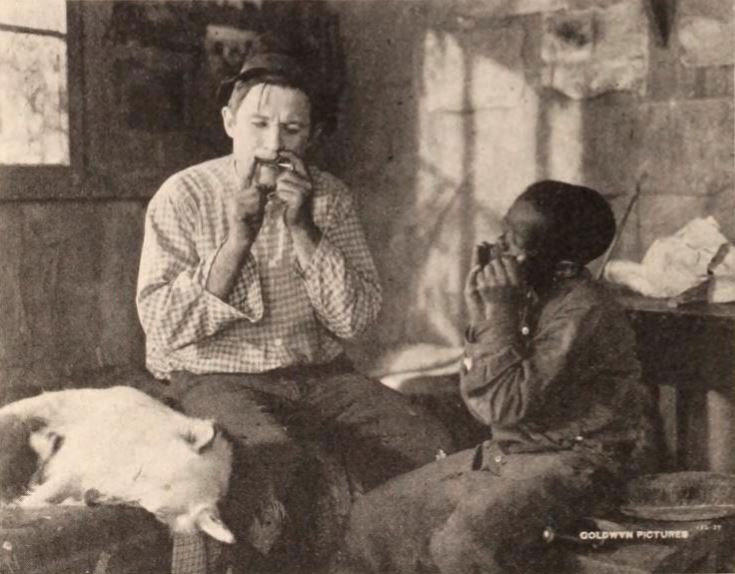
- Still with Will Rogers
- Directed by: Clarence G. Badger
- Screenplay by: Edfrid A. Bingham
- Based on: Boys Will Be Boys by Irvin S. Cobb
- Produced by: Samuel Goldwyn
- Starring: Will Rogers; Irene Rich; Charles Mason; Sidney Ainsworth; Edward Kimball; Milton Ross
- Cinematography: Marcel Le Picard
- Production company: Goldwyn Pictures
- Distributed by: Goldwyn Pictures
- Release date: May 5, 1921
- Running time: 50 minutes
- Country: United States
- Language: Silent (English intertitles)

Boys Will Be Boys is a 1921 American comedy film directed by Clarence G. Badger and written by Edfrid A. Bingham. The film stars Will Rogers, Irene Rich, Charles Mason, Sidney Ainsworth, Edward Kimball, and Milton Ross. The film was released on May 5, 1921, by Goldwyn Pictures.

== Cast ==
- Will Rogers as Peep O'Day
- Irene Rich as Lucy
- Charles Mason as Tom Minor
- Sidney Ainsworth as Sublette
- Edward Kimball as Judge Priest
- Milton Ross as Bagby
- Charles Thurston as Sheriff Breck
- May Hopkins as Kitty
- Cordelia Callahan as Mrs. Hunter
- Nick Cogley as Aunt Mandy
- Burton Halbert as Farmer Bell
