= Who Is Number One? =

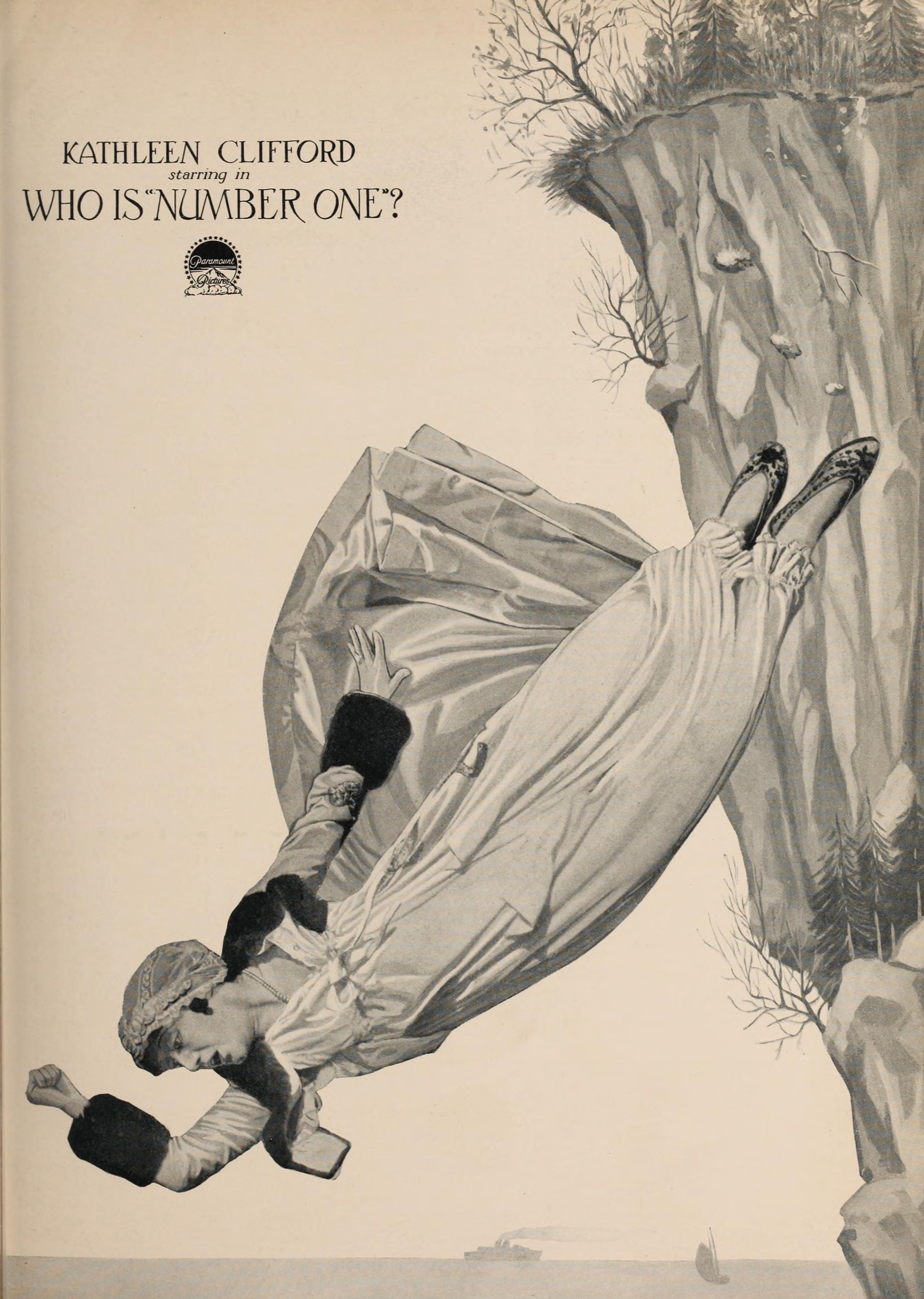
- Advertisement for film with Kathleen Clifford
- Directed by: William Bertram
- Screenplay by: Anna Katharine Green
- Starring: Kathleen Clifford; Cullen Landis; Gordon Sackville; Neil Hardin; Bruce Smith; Ethel Ritchie
- Production company: Paramount Pictures
- Distributed by: Paramount Pictures
- Release date: October 29, 1917
- Running time: 15 episodes (2 reels each)
- Country: United States
- Language: Silent (English intertitles)

Who Is Number One? is a 1917 American silent mystery film serial directed by William Bertram and written by Anna Katharine Green. The film stars Kathleen Clifford, Cullen Landis, Gordon Sackville, Neil Hardin, Bruce Smith, and Ethel Ritchie. The film serial was released on October 29, 1917, by Paramount Pictures. It is presumed to be a lost film.

== Cast ==
- Kathleen Clifford as Aimee Villon
- Cullen Landis as Tommy Hale
- Gordon Sackville
- Neil Hardin
- Bruce Smith
- Ethel Ritchie
- Corinne Grant

== Chapters ==
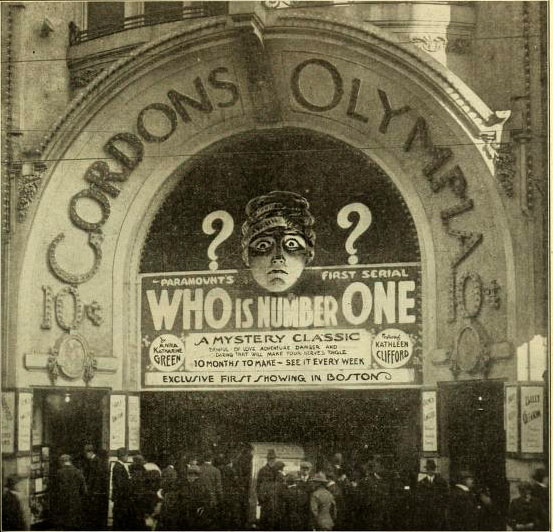
Boston cinema promoting the film

1. The Flaming Cross
2. The Flying Fortress
3. The Sea Crawler
4. A Marine Miracle
5. Halls of Hazard
6. The Flight of the Fury
7. Hearts in Torment
8. Walls of Gas
9. Struck Down
10. Wires of Wrath
11. The Rail Raiders
12. The Show Down
13. Cornered
14. No Surrender
15. The Round Up

== Reception ==
Like many American films of the time, Who Is Number One? was subject to cuts by city and state film censorship boards. The Chicago Board of Censors required cuts, in Chapter 1, of two scenes of destroying window bars, two scenes of burning vault combination, opening strong box and taking papers, first scene of attack on Hale and son, and the attack on girl in the vault; Chapter 2, five holdup scenes and the second scene of slugging young Hale; Chapter 3, three scenes of slugging watchman and the holding up of the ship's officer; Chapter 5, the intertitle "Only a door protecting her from the violence of desire", three fight scenes between girl and man, choking Hale in cab, binding and beating officers, and knocking Hale on the head; Chapter 8, the intertitle "Rayne explains why Hale still lives tho doomed to die by the T.T.T.", the bogus fireman striking officer at door of bank, and two scenes of theft of gold from bank; in Chapter 9, two scenes of threatening man with gun and four fight scenes including striking man on head; in Chapter 11, the holdup of Hale, theft of papers, a slugging scene, and the choking of the conductor and throwing him from the train; in Chapter 13, the intertitle "If you're not here in 30 minutes, both will die" and the closeup of the handcuffing by T.T.T.; in Chapter 14, the intertitle "Graham Hale must die", placing old man in trunk, the intertitle "The newspapers tomorrow will tell of the suicide of Dr. Kent", all details showing the attempt to murder Kent and give it the appearance of suicide, view of old man on pedestal after shooting through door, last struggle scene where policeman is punched, and the entire incident of throwing policeman the roof and stepping on his fingers while hanging; and, in Chapter 15, Reel 1, striking man in the head with gun and, in Reel 2, throwing man out of window.
