= Across the Dead-Line =

1922 film by Jack Conway

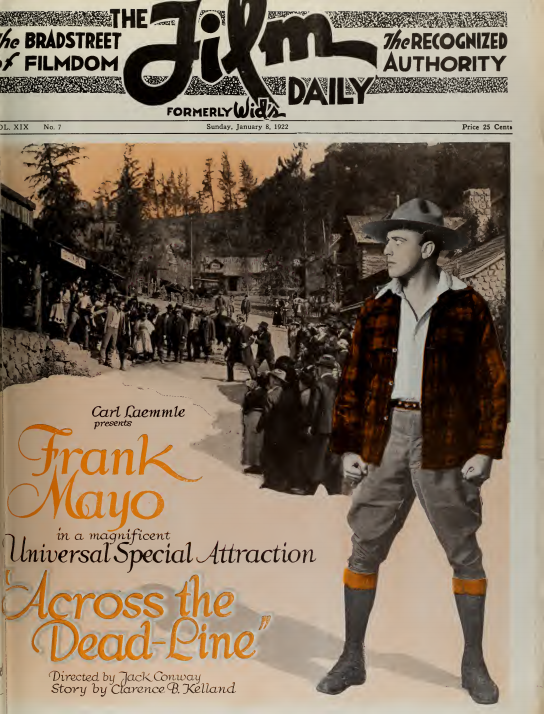
- Advertisement
- Directed by: Jack Conway
- Written by: George C. Hull
- Story by: Clarence Budington Kelland
- Produced by: Carl Laemmle
- Starring: Frank Mayo
- Cinematography: Leland Lancaster
- Distributed by: Universal Film Manufacturing Company
- Release date: January 9, 1922
- Running time: 5 reels
- Country: United States
- Language: Silent (English intertitles)

Across the Dead-Line is a lost 1922 American silent northwoods drama film directed by Jack Conway and starring Frank Mayo.

== Plot ==
As described in a film magazine, after Enoch Kidder discovers his son John in his brother Aaron's saloon, he lays a line down the center of the main street of the rough mining town and separating the brothers' houses, and tells Aaron that he will kill him if he ever steps across it. John later finds a young woman in the wood wearing a wedding gown who does not remember how she got there or her name, and John befriends her against his father's wishes. Aaron wants to discredit John's honesty and attempts to blackmail him and kidnap the woman, now known as Ruth. Aaron obtains a warrant to arrest the woman by a man posing as her husband. Warned of Aaron's plan, John takes Ruth to a lodge high in the mountains. Abel, an old man with a grievance against Aaron, follows him. Enoch also goes, determined to find his son. When Aaron attempts to arrest John, a fight breaks out between them. When Aaron is killed, the mystery of who shot him is cleared up when Abel confesses. Ruth's memory is restored, and there is a happy ending when her bogus husband is exposed.

== Cast ==
- Frank Mayo as John Kidder
- Russell Simpson as Enoch Kidder
- Wilfred Lucas as Aaron Kidder
- Lydia Knott as Charity Kidder
- Molly Malone as Ruth
- Frank Thorwald as Lucas Courtney
- Josef Swickard as Abel
- William Marion as Gillis
- George Williamson as Judge White
- Whitehorse as Buck Ballard
- Alfred Hewston as Station agent

== Preservation ==
With no holdings located in archives, Across the Dead-Line is considered a lost film.
