= Kathleen Clifford =

American actress

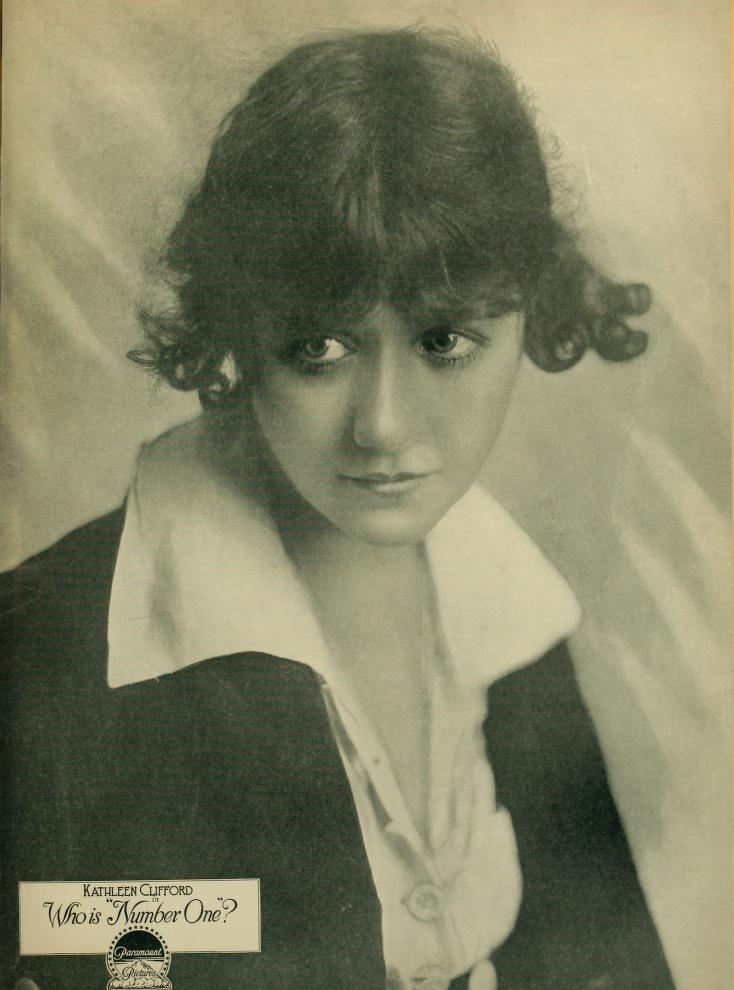
- Kathleen Clifford in Who Is Number One? (1917)
- Born: February 16, 1887; Charlottesville, Virginia, U.S.
- Died: December 28, 1962 (aged 75); Los Angeles, California, U.S.
- Occupation: Actress
- Years active: 1902–1932
- Spouse: Meo Illitch (m. 1926)

Kathleen Clifford (February 16, 1887 – December 28, 1962) was an American vaudeville and Broadway stage and film actress of the early twentieth century. She was known for her skills as a male impersonator.

== Biography ==
Born in Charlottesville, Virginia, Clifford was educated in Dresden and in Brighton, England.

Clifford initially built her acting on the vaudeville stages as a comedian. She was renowned for her impersonations of men and was often humorously billed as "The Smartest Chap in Town". She often pretended to have been born in England. At one point, as a male impersonator, she was working as a duo with female impersonator Bothwell Browne.

Clifford debuted on Broadway in 1902 as a member of the chorus in Tommy Rot. Her other Broadway credits included A Pair of Queens (1916), A Winsome Widow (1912), A Night with the Pierrots / Sesostra / The Whirl of Society (1912), The Belle of London Town, and Fad and Folly (1902).

By 1904, Clifford had joined Edna Wallace Hopper's supporting company in vaudeville. She progressed from that status to musical comedies in which she danced and had small featured roles.

Clifford served during the early years of World War I as a Red Cross nurse with the British Army in France, and was awarded honorary colonelcy of a Canadian regiment.

Clifford made her screen debut in the 1917 William Bertram-directed mystery serial Who Is Number One? opposite silent film actor Cullen Landis. She appeared in several high-profile roles throughout the late 1910s and early 1920s, most notably: opposite Douglas Fairbanks, Sr. in the 1919 comedy When the Clouds Roll By, in the crime drama Kick In opposite Betty Compson, May McAvoy and Bert Lytell (1922), and in the role of 'Queen Berengaria' opposite Wallace Beery and the young actress Marguerite De La Motte in Richard the Lion-Hearted (1923). Clifford's last silent film was the 1928 James Cruze-directed comedy Excess Baggage opposite silent film actor William Haines.

With the advent of talkies Clifford settled into semi-retirement. She made only one film during the early years of sound film; The Bride's Bereavement, a comedy short featuring several former silent film stars such as Aileen Pringle, Montagu Love, Luis Alberni, and Charles Ray.

Clifford also wrote a novel, It's April. . . Remember?, about her time in Hollywood.

Clifford died at the age of 75 in Los Angeles, California in 1962. She was buried in Belgrade, Yugoslavia, her husband's former home.

== Filmography ==
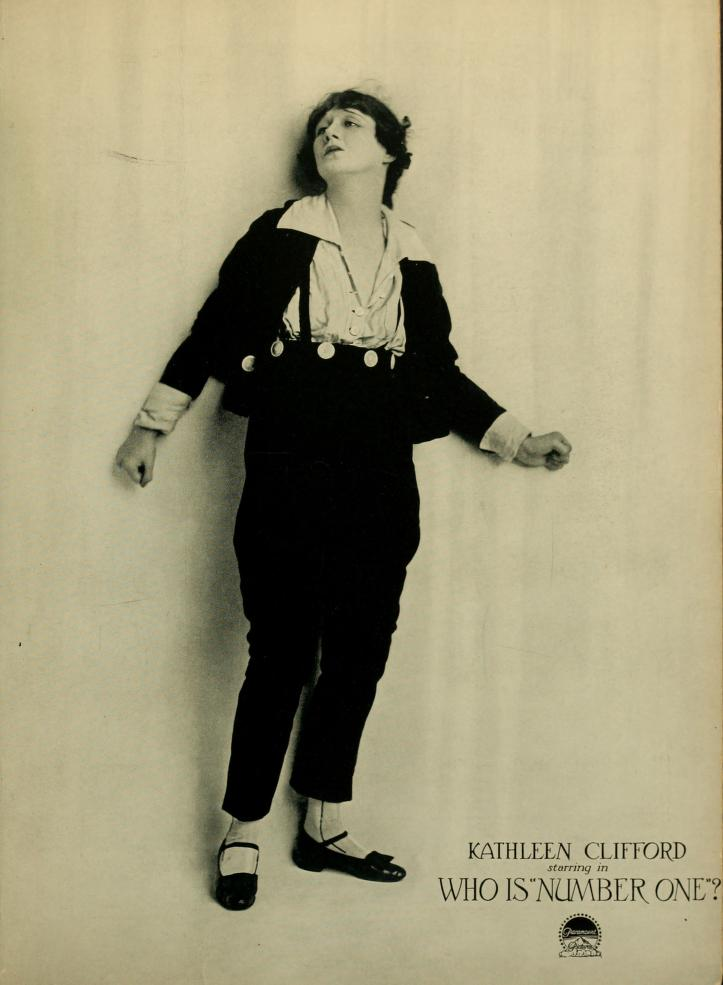
Clifford in Who is Number One?, 1917

- The Bride's Bereavement (alternate title: The Snake in the Grass) (1932)
- Excess Baggage (1928)
- Sporting Life (1925)
- The Love Gamble (1925)
- Grandpa's Girl (1924)
- No More Women (1924)
- Richard the Lion-Hearted (1923)
- Kick In (1922)
- Cold Steel (1921)
- When the Clouds Roll By (1919)
- Angel Child (1919)
- The Law That Divides (1918)
- Who Is Number One? (1917)
