= The Girl from Rocky Point =

1922 film

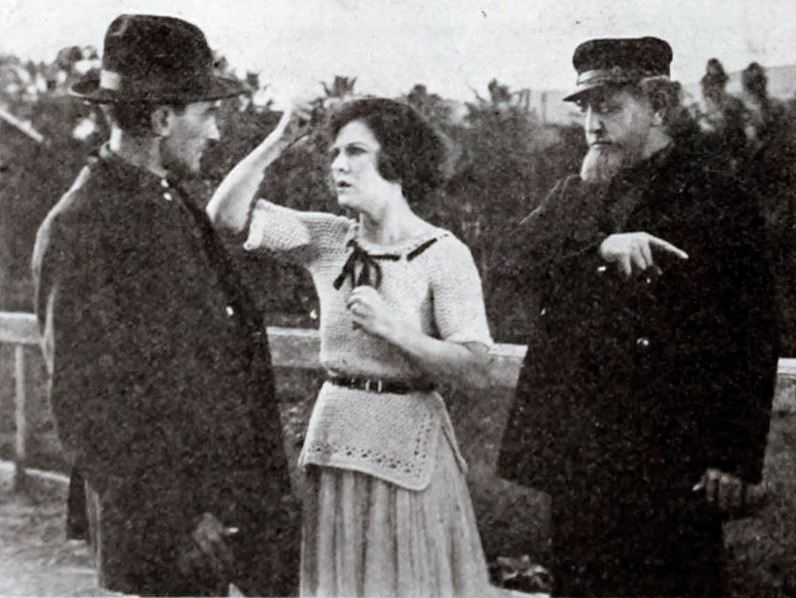
- Directed by: Fred Becker
- Written by: Sherwood MacDonald
- Starring: Milton Ross; Ora Carew; Gloria Joy
- Cinematography: John Thompson
- Production company: Pacific Film Company
- Distributed by: Pacific Film Company
- Release date: February 1, 1922
- Running time: 50 minutes
- Country: United States
- Languages: Silent; English intertitles

The Girl from Rocky Point is a 1922 American silent drama film directed by Fred Becker and starring Milton Ross, Ora Carew and Gloria Joy.

== Plot ==
A young woman falls in love with man shipwrecked on the Maine coastline, but has to contend with her stern father and a local mischief-maker determined to break up the romance.

== Cast ==
- Milton Ross as Samuel Hayden
- Ora Carew as Betty
- Gloria Joy as Corrine
- Charles Spere as Daniel Williams
- E.G. Davidson as Timothy Smith
- Theodore von Eltz as Robert Giffing
- Verna Brooks as Mignon
- Walt Whitman as The Devil

== Bibliography ==
- Connelly, Robert B. The Silents: Silent Feature Films, 1910-36, Volume 40, Issue 2. December Press, 1998.
- Munden, Kenneth White. The American Film Institute Catalog of Motion Pictures Produced in the United States, Part 1. University of California Press, 1997.
