= The Red Circle (serial) =

1915 film

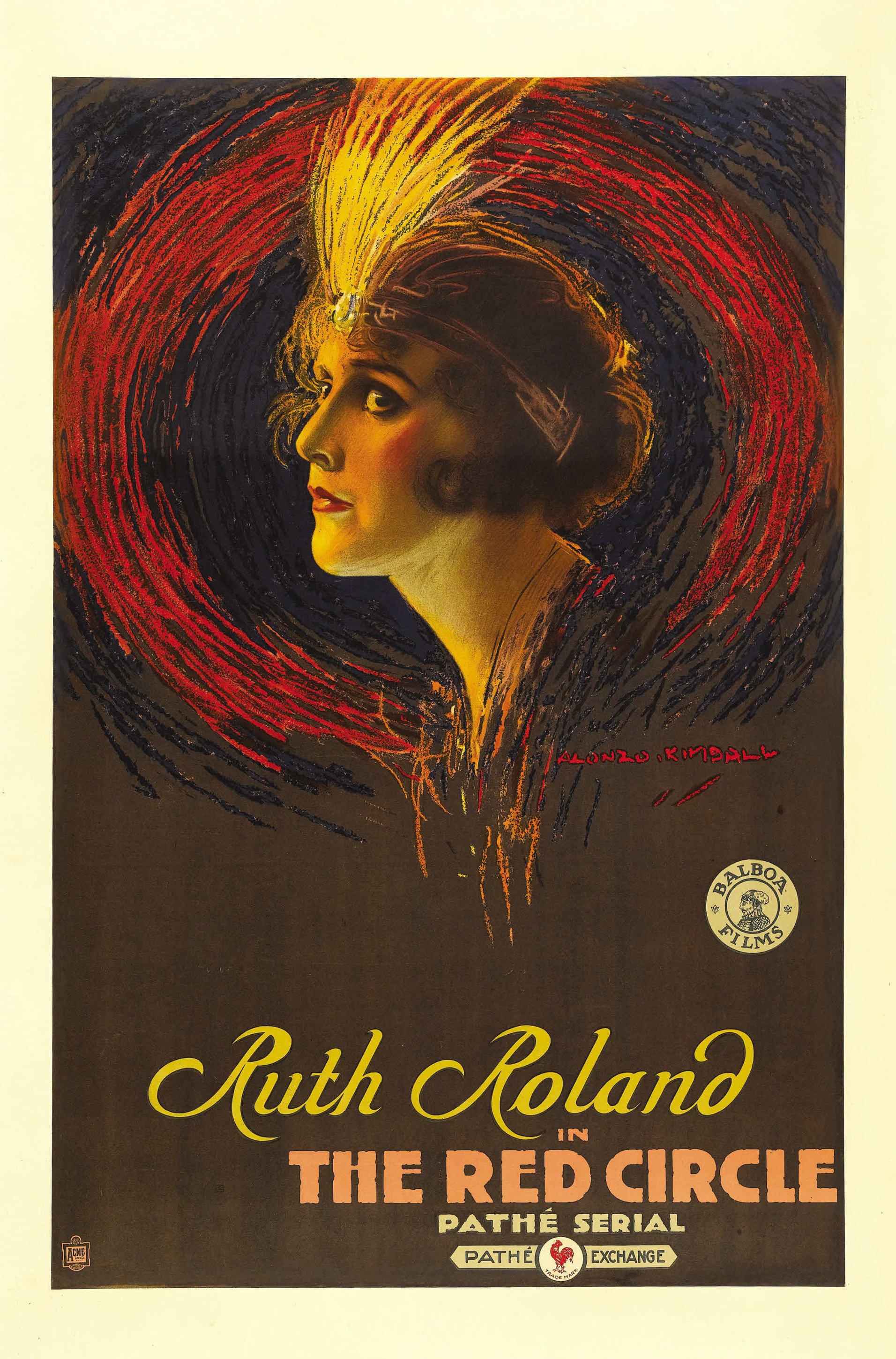
- Poster design by Alonzo Myron Kimball
- Directed by: Sherwood MacDonald
- Written by: Will M. Ritchey
- Starring: Ruth Roland; Jack Rollens; Frank Mayo
- Cinematography: William Beckway
- Production company: Balboa Amusement Producing Company
- Distributed by: Pathé Exchange
- Release date: December 16, 1915
- Running time: 14 episodes
- Country: United States
- Language: Silent with English intertitles

Film trailer

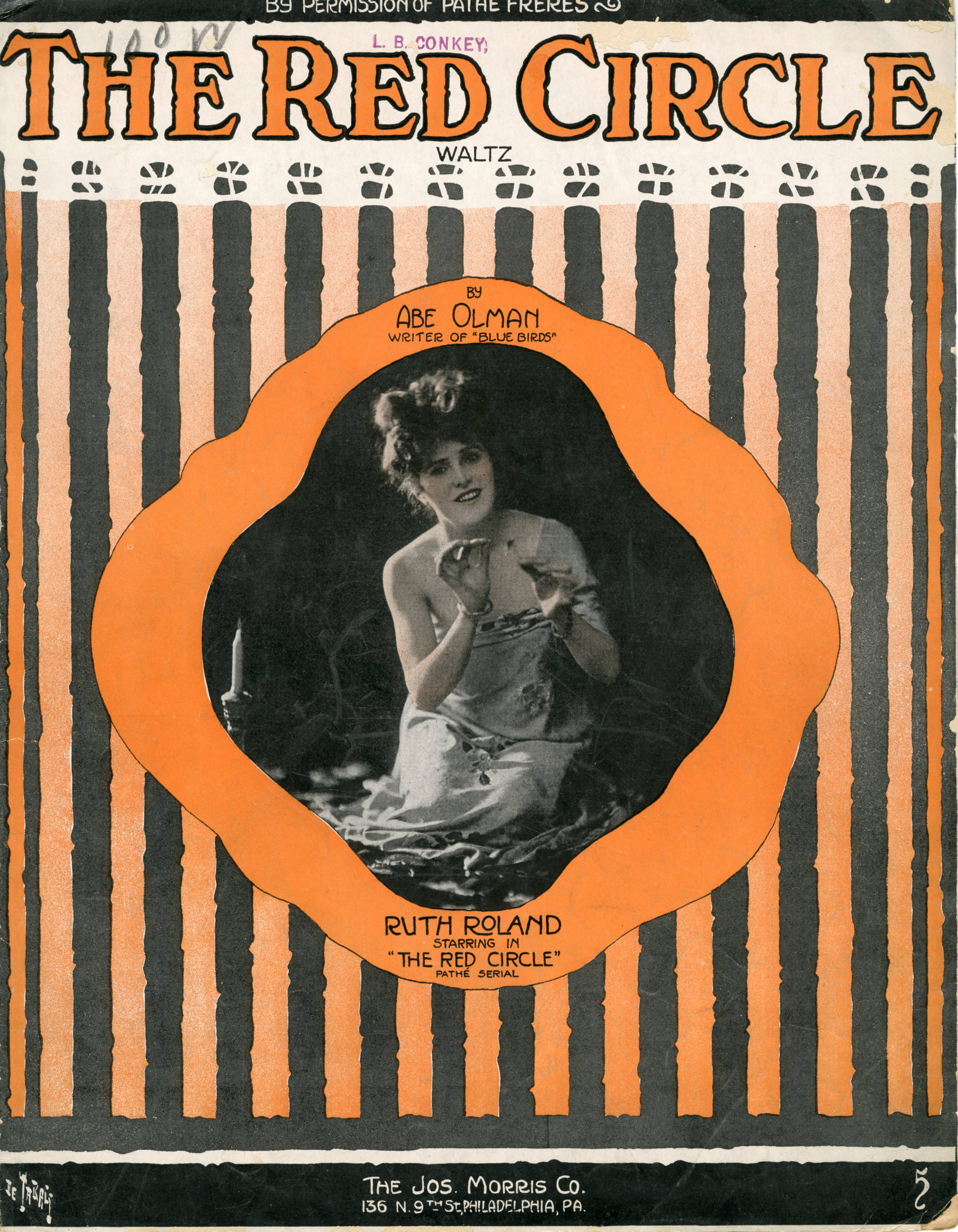
Sheet music cover for The Red Circle waltz

The Red Circle is a 1915 American drama film serial directed by Sherwood MacDonald. The film is considered to be lost although a short trailer for the film survives, as well as short paper print segments and a French novelization by Maurice Leblanc. The Red Circle was Ruth Roland's first serial role.

== Plot ==
The Red Circle is a birthmark, on the hand of the heroine, noticeable only in times of stress and excitement, which forces her to steal, leading to no end of complications and intrigue.

== Cast ==
- Ruth Roland as June Travers
- Frank Mayo as Dr. Max Lamar
- Philo McCullough
- Gordon Sackville as Chief of Police
- Corinne Grant as Mary, June's Nurse
- Mollie McConnell as Mrs. Travis
- Andrew Arbuckle
- Bruce Smith
- Bert Francis
- Ruth Lackaye
- Myrtle Reeves
- Daniel Gilfether as Circle Jim Barden
- Makoto Inokuchi as The Butler
- Gayne Whitman as Fred Whitman
- Frank Erlanger
- Edward Peters as Son of Circle

== Episodes ==
The serial consisted of fourteen episodes:

1. Nevermore
2. Pity the Poor
3. Twenty Years Ago
4. In Strange Attire
5. Weapons of War
6. False Colors
7. Two Captives
8. Peace at Any Price
9. Dodging the Law
10. Excess Baggage
11. Seeds of Suspicion
12. Like a Rat in a Trap
13. Branded as a Thief
14. Judgement Day

== See also ==
- List of film serials
- List of film serials by studio
