= Lillian Biron =

Actress

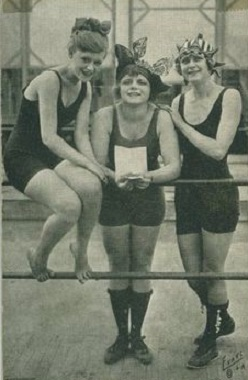
Lillian Biron, Vera Reynolds, and Teddy Sampson

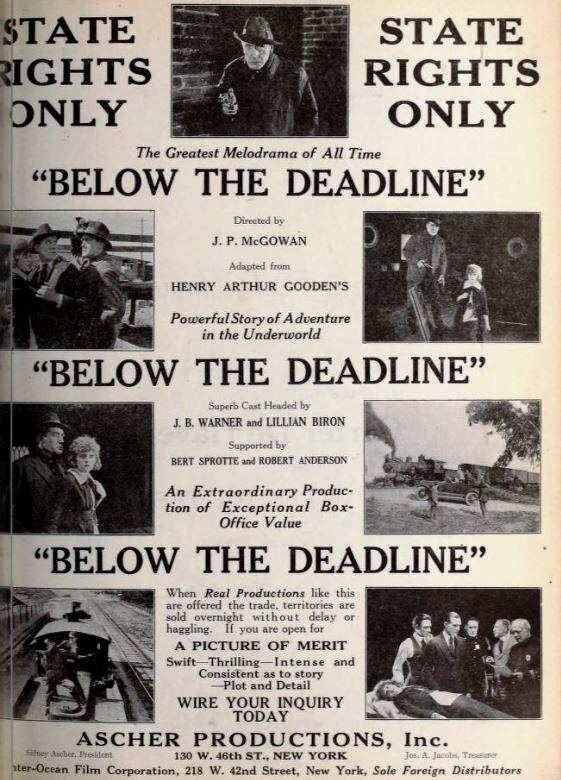

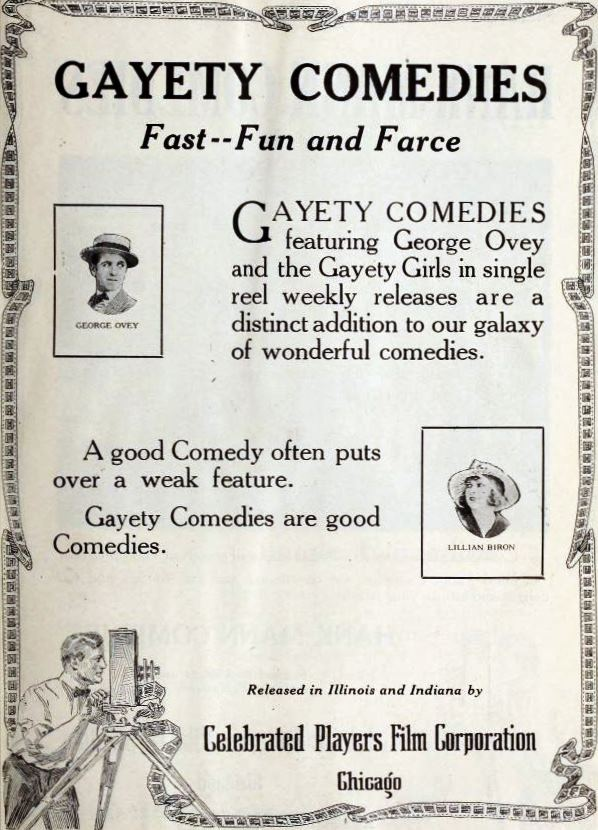

Lillian Biron (September 2, 1898 – December 23, 1957), also known as Lillian Thompson, was an actress in American comedy films. She was in Vogue Comedies. She then featured in Gayety Comedies with George Ovey. She starred in Below the Deadline with H. B. Warner. She featured in Mack Sennett comedy films.

== Career ==
Before becoming an actress, Biron worked in 1916 as a movie ticket collector and cashier at Liberty Theater in Long Beach, California. That same year, she was picked to star in several of the comedy films produced at Keystone Studios and was described by Charles Murray to be a favorite at the studio. She was cast for major roles by director Mack Sennett. After James Clemens was promoted to a directorial position in November 1919, he began producing films for the Gayety Comedies series that primarily featured Biron as female lead. She played the role of gang leader's wife, Alice Elliot, in the 1921 production of Below the Deadline. Described in the Record-Journal as "one of the most beautiful actresses of the day", her character representation was claimed to place her alongside the likes of other big stars in film thanks to her conducting "one of the greatest emotional portrayals ever offered".

== Personal life ==
Biron divorced from her husband, Harlan Thompson, in September 1920 after Harlan filed for divorce and Biron filed a cross-complaint accusing him of refusing to work.

== Filmography ==
- A Bachelor's Finish (1917)
- Hobbled Hearts (1917)
- A Berth Scandal (1917)
- His Sudden Rival (1917)
- A Dark Room Secret (1917)
- An International Sneak (1918)
- Dark and Cloudy (1919)
- Calling His Bluff (1919)
- Lovesick at Sea (1919)
- Dropped Into Scandal (1919)
- Are Flirts Foolish? (1920)
- His Fatal Bite (1920)
- Saphead's Sacrifice (1920)
- Good Morning, Nurse (1920)
- Cursed by His Cleverness (1920)
- Ladies Must Dance (1920)
- Ruined By Love (1920)
- Bounced (1920)
- Fireman Save My Gal (1920)
- Twin Bedlam (1920)
- Why Cooks Go Cuckoo (1920)
- One Day (1920)
- The Fatal Wallop (1920)
- Eight Hours (1920)
- Twin Crooks (1921)
- Below the Deadline (1921)
- A Pair of Sexes (1921)
- Sunless Sunday (1922)
- Whirlwind (1922)
- The Kickin' Fool (1922)
- Captain Kidd's Finish (1922)
- Hip-Hip Hypnotism (1924)
