= Excess Baggage (1928 film) =

1928 film by James Cruze

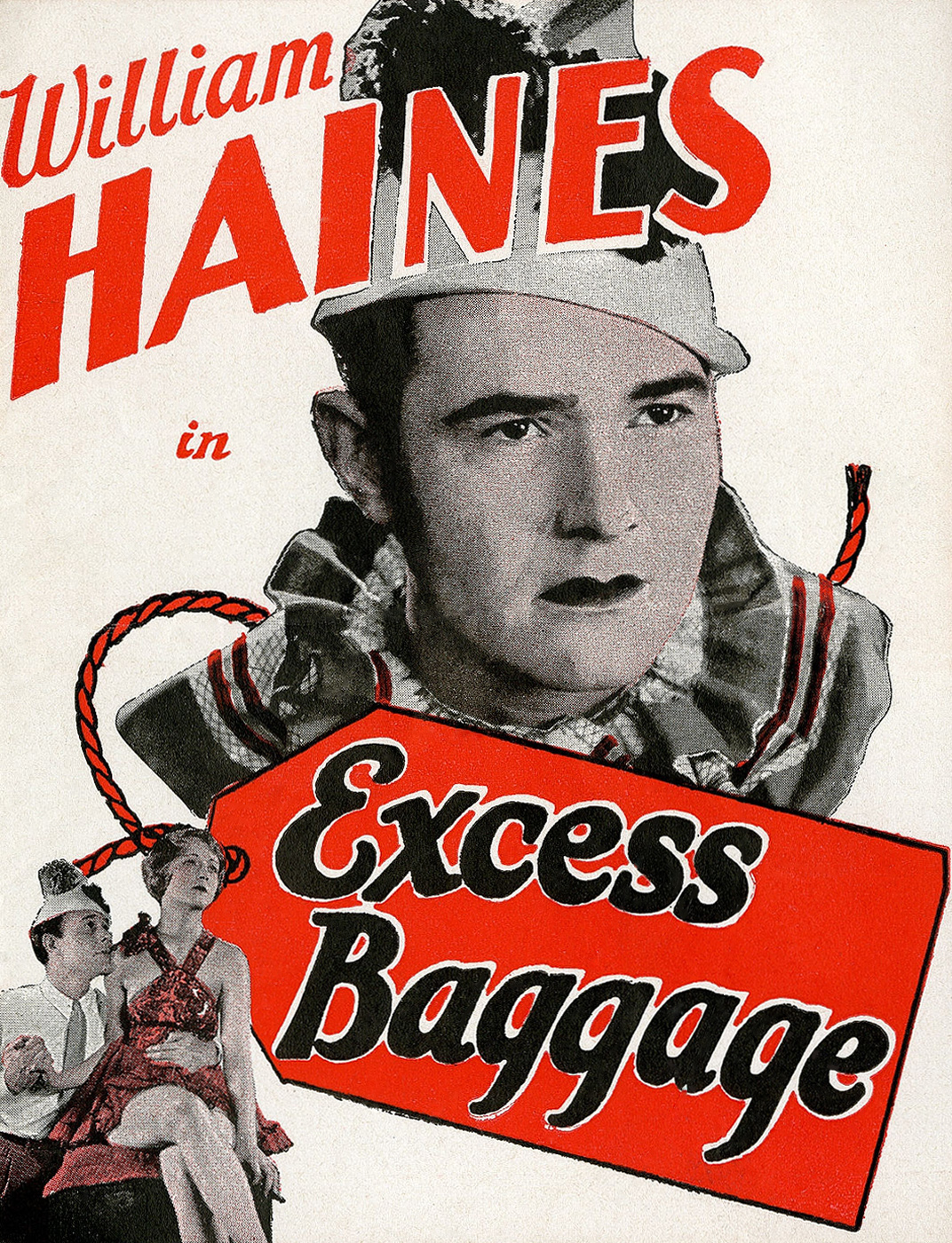
- Directed by: James Cruze
- Written by: Francis Marion; Ralph Spence (titles)
- Screenplay by: Ralph Spence
- Based on: Excess Baggage by John McGowan
- Produced by: James Cruze; Julius Hagen
- Starring: William Haines; Josephine Dunn
- Cinematography: Ira H. Morgan
- Edited by: George Hively
- Distributed by: Metro-Goldwyn-Mayer
- Release date: September 8, 1928 (United States)
- Running time: 80 minutes
- Country: United States
- Languages: Sound (Synchronized) (English Intertitles)

Excess Baggage is a lost 1928 American synchronized sound comedy film directed by James Cruze and distributed by MGM. While the film has no audible dialog, it was released with a synchronized musical score with sound effects using both the sound-on-disc and sound-on-film process. The film was based on the 1927 play of the same name by John McGowan. The film starred William Haines, Josephine Dunn and Kathleen Clifford.

== Plot ==
Eddie Kane (William Haines) is a brash, cocky vaudeville performer known for his acrobatic juggling routines and daredevil wire-walking stunts. Though talented, Eddie is more showman than businessman, relying on swagger and spontaneity to carry him through a life of uncertain bookings and backstage scraps.

His life changes when he meets Elsa McCoy (Josephine Dunn), one of “Dunn’s Dancing Dames,” a chorus line troupe led by the flashy promoter Jimmy Dunn (Neely Edwards). Elsa is beautiful, ambitious, and talented, and despite Eddie’s bumbling charm, the two fall genuinely in love. Their whirlwind romance leads to a quick marriage, and for a brief time they seem to be climbing together toward stardom.

But the entertainment world is shifting. Elsa lands an opportunity in the movies and quickly ascends into a rising film career. Meanwhile, Eddie, stuck in vaudeville's waning orbit, begins to feel left behind. As Elsa grows in fame and prestige, Eddie’s own bookings shrink, and he becomes increasingly insecure and embittered.

Complicating matters is Val D’Ierrico (Ricardo Cortez), a suave and popular actor who stars opposite Elsa in her new film roles. Eddie becomes consumed by suspicion and jealousy, convinced that Elsa has been unfaithful with Val. Though the script reveals no direct affair, Eddie’s pride and insecurity distort every glance and gesture. Tension between the couple builds until unable to bridge the emotional distance, Eddie and Elsa separate. Elsa moves deeper into her movie career, while Eddie returns to performing in cheap theaters.

Alone and determined to reclaim the spotlight, Eddie attempts a dramatic comeback with a dangerous high wire act. But during a performance, he loses his footing and takes a serious fall, injuring himself both physically and emotionally. The accident becomes a turning point, not just in his career, but in his spirit. Stripped of bravado, he finds himself stuck between fading glory and paralyzing fear.

Months later, Eddie is given another chance. Jimmy Dunn books him for a comeback performance — billed as “Eddie Kane: Back from the Brink.” But backstage, Eddie paces nervously, unable to focus. When the time comes for the stunt, he freezes at the platform, paralyzed by fear. The stage manager yells cues. The orchestra stalls. The audience murmurs.

Just when it seems Eddie will back down Elsa appears backstage. Her sudden arrival shocks Eddie back to life. With renewed courage, Eddie performs the stunt, descending the wire with flair and landing safely, regaining not only the audience’s applause but his own sense of identity and self-worth. Moved by Eddie’s struggle and still deeply in love, she assures him that she never stopped caring and that her loyalty to him never wavered.

The final scene finds Eddie and Elsa reunited, their love tempered by hardship but strengthened by mutual support and understanding. Fame may be fleeting, but their bond, tested and renewed, carries them forward.

== Cast ==
- William Haines – Eddie Kane
- Josephine Dunn – Elsa McCoy
- Neely Edwards – Jimmy Dunn
- Kathleen Clifford – Mabel Ford
- Greta Granstedt – Betty Ford
- Ricardo Cortez – Val D'Ierrico
- Cyril Chadwick – Crammon
- Delmer Daves (uncredited)

== Music ==
This film featured a theme song entitled "In A Little Hide-Away" which was composed by William Axt, David Mendoza and Howard Dietz.

== See also ==
- List of early sound feature films (1926–1929)
