= Gordon Sackville =

American actor

Gordon Sackville (born 1880 - August 6, 1926) was a film actor. Earlier in his career he appeared on stage. He was part of several Hobart Bosworth productions. He was in The Best Man Wins, one of the first Hollywood films.

Sackville was born in Peterborough, Ontario.

He died of a stroke in 1926.

== Filmography ==
- The Best Man Wins (1911 film)
- Hearts in Conflict (1912)
- The Sea Wolf (1913 film) (1913)
- The Chechako (1914)
- The Squaw Man (1914)
- An Odyssey of the North (1914)
- The Cherry Pickers (1914 film) (1914)
- Midnight Call (1914)
- The Red Circle (serial) (1915)
- Pay Dirt (1916), serial that survives
- The Grip of Evil (1916)
- The Sultana (1916)
- The Girl Who Loves a Soldier (1916)
- The Love of Madge O'Mara (1917)
- Who Is Number One? (1917)
- Mentioned in Confidence (1917)
- The Devil's Bait (1917)
- The Victor of the Plot (1917)
- Three X Gordon (1918)
- The Law That Divides (1918)
- The Boomerang (film) (1919)
- Baby Marie's Round Up (1919)
- The Invisible Hand (serial) (1920)
- Pollyanna (1920), bit role but the film survives
- Dr. Jim (1921)
- With Stanley in Africa (1922)
- Any Night (1922)
- Around the World in Eighteen Days (1923)
- The Ghost Patrol (1923)
- Slow as Lightning (1923), survives
- The Snob
- The Texas Terror (1925)
- Cowboy Courage (film) (1925)
- Lightning Hutch (1926)
