= Gayety Comedies =

Comedy film series in the silent film era

Gayety Comedies are a comedy film series released made in the United States during the silent film era. They debuted in 1919 and were distributed to various film exchanges Al Christie produced them. The studio that made them was owned by E. H. Emmick and J. L. Friedman and was on the corner of Sunset Boulevard and Gower Street.

George Ovey and Lillian Biron featured in several. Biron had previously acted in Vogue Comedies. Billy Bletcher and Vera Reynolds were added to keep up with production demand.

Gayety Studios advertised itself as producing a one-reel comedy once a week. The content was promoted as "polite slapstick."

The New England territorial sales were handled by the American Feature Film Company. In western Pennsylvania and West Virginia, they were overseen by The Quality Film Company. The Electric Theatre Supply Company handled the film rights in the majority of Mid-Atlantic states, and the Southeastern United States were managed by the E and H Film Distributing Company.

The production company was active in 1919 and 1920.

== Fiomography ==
- Dropped into Scandal
- Are Flirts Foolish?
- Dark and Cloudy (1919)
- Lovesick at Sea (1919)
- Fireman, Save My Gal!, extant
- Dry and Thirsty
- Ladies Must Dance (1920)
- Say Uncle
- Afraid of His Wife
- Oh, Brother
- Wild and Willie
- Assault and Flattery
- Standing Pat
