= Dr. Jim =

1921 film

- Directed by: William Worthington
- Written by: Eugene B. Lewis; Stuart Paton
- Produced by: Carl Laemmle
- Starring: Frank Mayo; Claire Windsor; Robert Anderson
- Cinematography: Leland Lancaster
- Production company: Universal Pictures
- Distributed by: Universal Pictures
- Release date: November 28, 1921
- Running time: 50 minutes
- Country: United States
- Languages: Silent; English intertitles

Dr. Jim is a 1921 American silent drama film directed by William Worthington and starring Frank Mayo, Claire Windsor and Robert Anderson.

== Cast ==
- Frank Mayo as Dr. Jim Keene
- Claire Windsor as Helen Keene
- Oliver Cross as Kenneth Cord
- Stanhope Wheatcroft as Bobby Thorne
- Robert Anderson as Tom Anderson
- Herbert Heyes as Captain Blake
- Gordon Sackville as Assistant Doctor

== Bibliography ==
- Connelly, Robert B. The Silents: Silent Feature Films, 1910-36, Volume 40, Issue 2. December Press, 1998.
- Munden, Kenneth White. The American Film Institute Catalog of Motion Pictures Produced in the United States, Part 1. University of California Press, 1997.
