= The Altar Stairs =

1922 film

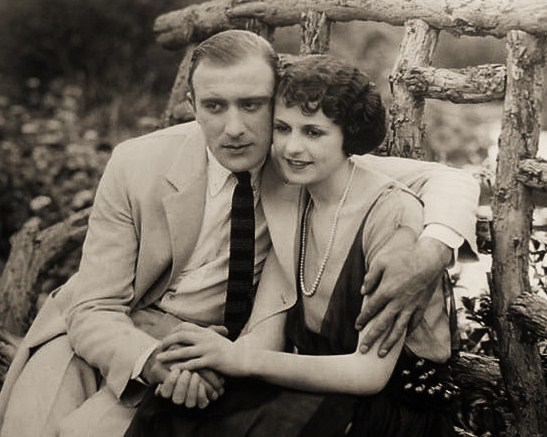
- Film still with Frank Mayo and Louise Lorraine
- Directed by: Lambert Hillyer
- Written by: Doris Schroeder; George Hively; George Randolph Chester
- Based on: The Altar Stairs by G. B. Lancaster (novel)
- Produced by: Carl Laemmle
- Starring: Frank Mayo; Louise Lorraine; Boris Karloff; Lawrence Hughes
- Cinematography: Dwight Warren
- Distributed by: Universal Pictures
- Release date: December 4, 1922
- Running time: 5 reels (50 minutes)
- Country: United States
- Language: Silent (English intertitles)

The Altar Stairs is a 1922 American silent drama film directed by Lambert Hillyer and featuring Frank Mayo, Louise Lorraine, Lawrence Hughes and Boris Karloff in an early role. The screenplay was written by Doris Schroeder, George Hively and George Randolph Chester, based on the novel of the same name by G. B. Lancaster. It is considered today a lost film.

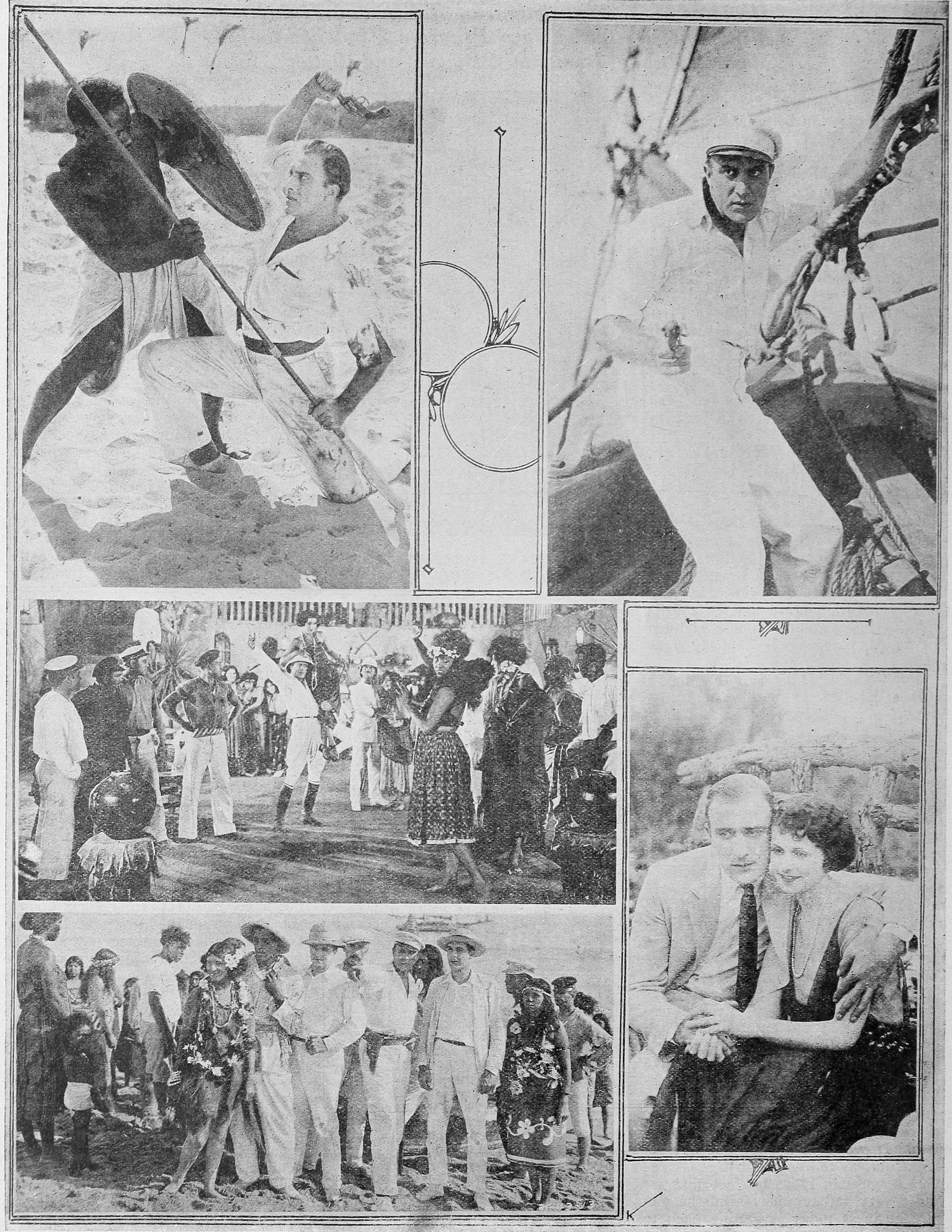
Publicity photos for the film.

== Plot ==
Rod McLean, a South Seas trader, saves derelict Tony Heritage from some natives, and Tony repays him by stealing his money and escaping to France. There he marries Joie, the daughter of Captain Jean Malet who is scheduled to take a post in the South Seas. When the officer learns of Tony's past misdeeds, he repudiates his daughter's marriage and takes Joie with him to the South Seas. Tony then turns up there and Captain Malet, to keep him away from Joie, gives him a job helping Rod McLean establish a new trading post on another island. Rod has fallen in love with Joie, but after he discovers that she is married (although he does not know to whom), he rejects her as a flirt.

Back at the new post, Rod discovers that Tony has gotten the natives drunk and they are burning the island chapel. He finds out that Tony is Joie's husband, but is stopped by the minister from killing him. Tony uses Rod's boat to escape to a steamer. Rod goes after him, followed by the minister who wants to prevent any killing, while Joie stays behind and awaits the film's climax on the main island.

== Cast ==
- Frank Mayo as Rod McLean
- Louise Lorraine as Joie Malet
- Lawrence Hughes as Tony Heritage
- J. Jiquel Lanoe as Captain Jean Malet (credited as J.J. Lanoe)
- Harry De Vere as Blundell
- Hugh Thompson as John Strickland
- Boris Karloff as Hugo
- Dagmar Godowsky as Parete
- Nick De Ruiz as Tulli

== See also ==
- List of American films of 1922
- Boris Karloff filmography
