= Common Property =

1919 silent film

- Directed by: William C. Dowlan; Paul Powell
- Written by: Elliott J. Clawson
- Produced by: Carl Laemmle
- Starring: Robert Anderson; Nell Craig; Colleen Moore
- Production company: Universal Pictures
- Distributed by: Universal Pictures
- Release date: October 18, 1919
- Running time: 60 minutes
- Country: United States
- Languages: Silent; English intertitles

Common Property is a 1919 American silent drama film directed by William C. Dowlan and Paul Powell and starring Robert Anderson, Nell Craig and Colleen Moore.

== Cast ==
- Robert Anderson as Paval Pavlovitch
- Nell Craig as Anna Pavlovitch
- Colleen Moore as Tatyone
- John Cook as Stepan
- Frank Leigh as Ivan Ivaoff
- Arthur Jasmine as Lyof
- Richard Cummings as Father Alexyei
- Robert Lawler as Vaska
- Arthur Maude as Nikolai

== Bibliography ==
- Codori, Jeff. Colleen Moore: A Biography of the Silent Film Star. McFarland, 2012.
