= Dark and Cloudy =

- Directed by: Craig Hutchinson
- Starring: Lillian Biron; George Ovey
- Production company: Gayety Comedies
- Release date: 1919
- Country: United States
- Languages: Silent film English intertitles

Dark and Cloudy is a 1919 film with Lillian Biron and George Ovey. It is part of the Library of Congress Black Films paper print collection, although it appears to be a comedy short featuring white actors. The film has been described as using blackface as a comic pretext. It was directed and written by Craig Hutchinson.

The film was advertised by its studio, Gayety Comedies, alongside the 1919 film Lovesick at Sea.
