= Cold Steel (1921 film) =

1921 film

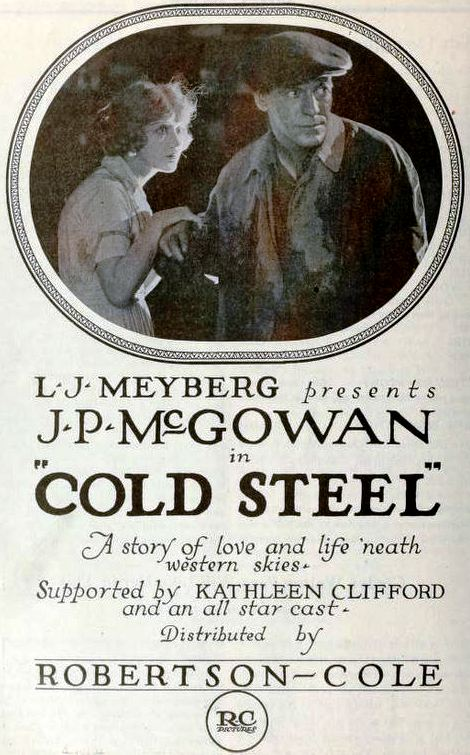
- Directed by: Sherwood MacDonald
- Written by: Monte M. Katterjohn; George C. Shedd
- Produced by: L.J. Meyberg
- Starring: J.P. McGowan; Kathleen Clifford; Stanhope Wheatcroft
- Cinematography: Hap Depew; John Thompson
- Production company: Robertson-Cole Pictures Corporation
- Distributed by: Robertson-Cole Pictures Corporation
- Release date: March 13, 1921
- Running time: 60 minutes
- Country: United States
- Languages: Silent; English intertitles

Cold Steel is a 1921 American silent action film directed by Sherwood MacDonald and starring J.P. McGowan, Kathleen Clifford and Stanhope Wheatcroft.

== Cast ==
- J.P. McGowan as Steele Weir
- Kathleen Clifford as Janet Hosmer
- Stanhope Wheatcroft as Ed Sorenson
- Arthur Millett as Mr. Sorenson
- Charles Inslee as Vose
- Milton Brown as Burkhart
- Nigel De Brulier as Martinez
- George Clair as Gordon
- Andrew Waldron as Johnson
- Elinor Fair as Mary Johnson
- V.L. Barnes as Bartender
- William Steele as Sheriff

== Censorship ==
Before the film could be exhibited in Kansas, the Kansas Board of Review required the elimination of several scenes and one intertitle. In reel 5, the intertitle removed said "We will stay here all night and there won't have to be a wedding." In reel 6, the scene removed depicted men blowing up an irrigation wall with a powder keg.

== Preservation ==
With no holdings located in archives, Cold Steel is considered a lost film.

== Bibliography ==
- Munden, Kenneth White. The American Film Institute Catalog of Motion Pictures Produced in the United States, Part 1. University of California Press, 1997.
