= An Old Fashioned Boy =

1920 film by Jerome Storm

An Old Fashioned Boy (aka An Old Fashioned Young Man)
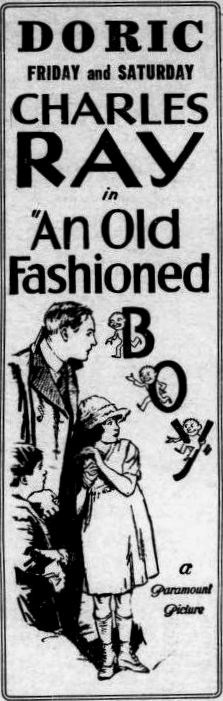
- Newspaper advertisement
- Directed by: Jerome Storm
- Written by: Agnes Christine Johnston (story, scenario)
- Produced by: Adolph Zukor; Jesse L. Lasky; Thomas H. Ince
- Starring: Charles Ray; Ethel Shannon
- Cinematography: Chester Lyons
- Production company: Thomas H. Ince Corporation
- Distributed by: Paramount Pictures
- Release date: October 31, 1920
- Running time: 5 reels
- Country: United States
- Language: Silent (English intertitles)

An Old Fashioned Boy is a surviving 1920 American silent romantic comedy film directed by Jerome Storm and starring Charles Ray. Famous Players–Lasky produced along with producer Thomas Ince. It was released by Paramount Pictures.

== Plot ==
As described in a film magazine, David Warrington is an old fashioned boy with old fashioned ideas regarding marriage, living in a real home, babies, and the like. He is in love with Betty Graves, a young woman who believes in the modern phases of life. After several heartaches and numerous comical situations, things shape themselves out so that Betty finds herself in her sweetheart's arms on the way to the minister for the wedding, having been convinced that the old fashioned way is the best after all.

== Cast ==
- Charles Ray as David Warrington
- Ethel Shannon as Betty Graves
- Alfred Allen as Dr. Graves
- Wade Boteler as Herbert
- Grace Morse as Sybil
- Gloria Joy as Violet
- Frankie Lee as Herbie
- Hallam Cooley as Fredie
- Virginia Brown as The Baby

== Preservation status ==
Prints exist at the Library of Congress, Gosfilmofond, UCLA Film & Television Archive.
