= Milton Ross =

American actor (1876–1941)

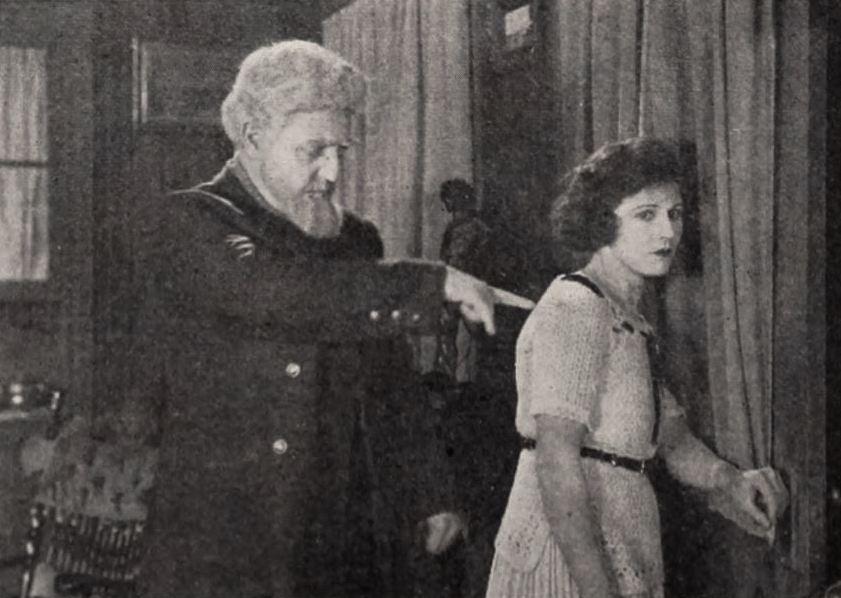
- Ross and Ora Carew in The Girl from Rocky Point (1922)
- Born: December 2, 1876; California, US
- Died: September 5, 1941 (aged 64); Los Angeles, California, US
- Occupation: Actor
- Years active: 1914–1926

Milton Ross (December 2, 1876 – September 6, 1941) was an American film actor. He appeared in more than 60 films between 1914 and 1941.

== Selected filmography ==
- The Green Swamp (1916)
- The Gunfighter (1917)
- The Desert Man (1917)
- Truthful Tulliver (1917)
- Idolators (1917)
- Time Locks and Diamonds (1917)
- Flare-Up Sal (1918)
- The Tiger Man (1918)
- Riddle Gawne (1918)
- The False Faces (1919)
- The End of the Game (1919)
- The Exquisite Thief (1919)
- Flame of the Desert (1919)
- Duds (1920)
- The Woman and the Puppet (1920)
- The Penalty (1920)
- Voices of the City (1921)
- The Killer (1921)
- Boys Will Be Boys (1921)
- Fortune's Mask (1922)
- The Girl from Rocky Point (1922)
- The Boss of Camp 4 (1922)
- Back Fire (1922)
- Gay and Devilish (1922)
- Salomy Jane (1923)
- The Virginian (1923)
- The Cowboy and the Flapper (1924)
- The Dixie Handicap (1924)
- Breed of the Border (1924)
- The White Desert (1925)
- Heads Up (1925)
- Beyond the Rockies (1926)
