= The Lullaby (1924 film) =

1924 silent film

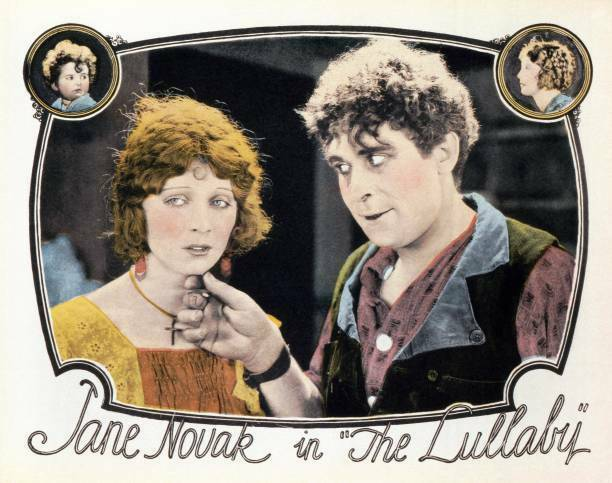
- Lobby card
- Directed by: Chester Bennett
- Written by: Lillian Ducey; Louis D. Lighton; Hope Loring
- Starring: Jane Novak; Robert Anderson; Fred Malatesta
- Cinematography: Jack MacKenzie
- Production company: Robertson-Cole Pictures Corporation
- Distributed by: Film Booking Offices of America
- Release date: January 20, 1923
- Running time: 70 minutes
- Country: United States
- Language: Silent (English intertitles)

The Lullaby is a 1924 American silent drama film directed by Chester Bennett and starring Jane Novak, Robert Anderson, and Fred Malatesta. The story recounts a man being hung and his pregnant wife sent to prison.

== Plot ==
As described in a film magazine review, newly wed Felipa is attacked by her husband Tony's friend Pietro. Tony intervenes and Pietro is killed. As a result, Tony is hanged for the killing and his pregnant wife is sentenced to imprisonment. A baby is born in prison, taken from its mother at the age of three, and adopted by the judge from the murder case, who is now the governor. After serving her twenty-year sentence, Filipa is released. For the sake of her child Antoinette, she resigns all legal claims to her in favor of the guardians who raised the child.

== Cast ==
- Jane Novak as Felipa / Antoinette
- Robert Anderson as Tony
- Fred Malatesta as Pietro
- Dorothy Brock as Baby Antoinette
- Cleo Madison as Mrs. Marvin
- Otis Harlan as Thomas Elliott
- Peter Burke as Thomas Jr.
- Lydia Yeamans Titus as Mary

== Preservation ==
With no prints of The Lullaby located in any film archives, it is considered a lost film.

== Bibliography ==
- Munden, Kenneth White. The American Film Institute Catalog of Motion Pictures Produced in the United States, Part 1. University of California Press, 1997.
