= Stanhope Wheatcroft =

American actor (1888–1966)

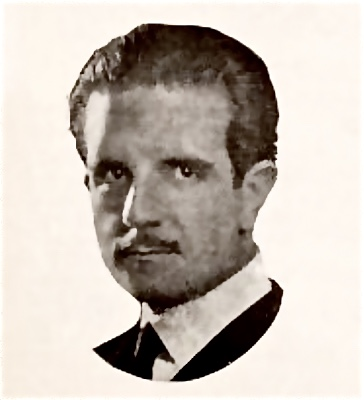
- Born: Stanhope Nelson Wheatcroft; May 11, 1888; New York, New York, US
- Died: February 13, 1966 (aged 77); Los Angeles, California, US
- Education: Columbia University
- Occupation: Actor
- Years active: 1905–1915 (Broadway); 1915–1942 (film)
- Spouse: Faye (1917–1966; his death)
- Children: Douglas Croft
- Parent(s): Nelson Wheatcroft; Adeline Stanhope

Stanhope Nelson Wheatcroft (May 11, 1888 – February 13, 1966) was an American actor of the stage and screen who was primarily active during Hollywood's silent era.

== Biography ==
Stanhope was born in New York City in 1888 to Nelson Wheatcroft and Adeline Stanhope. Both of his parents were renowned actors and drama teachers born in Europe. Stanhope attended Columbia University in New York City, and reportedly decided to embark upon a career as an actor after his father's death.

Wheatcroft was active in Broadway theater from 1905 through 1915. Broadway plays in which Wheatcroft appeared included Marrying Money (1914), A Gentleman from Mississippi (1908), The Warrens of Virginia (1907), The Movers (1907), Zira (1905), and Nancy Stair (1905). Wheatcroft began acting in silent films in 1915, and made a successful translation to talkies. After enjoying popularity during the silent era, his career waned in the 1930s, when his screen credits were primarily for his performances in bit parts.

Wheatcroft died in Los Angeles in 1966, and was survived by his third wife, Faye. His gravesite is at Valhalla Memorial Park in North Hollywood, California.

== Selected filmography ==
- The Ballet Girl (1916)
- East Lynne (1916)
- Under Two Flags (1916)
- On Dangerous Ground (1917)
- A Modern Cinderella (1917)
- The Corner Grocer (1917)
- God's Man (1917)
- Three X Gordon (1918)
- The Veiled Adventure (1919)
- The Home Town Girl (1919)
- The Blue Bonnet (1919)
- Destiny (1919)
- Her Purchase Price (1919)
- Her Five-Foot Highness (1920)
- The House of Toys (1920)
- The Breath of the Gods (1920)
- Dr. Jim (1921)
- Cold Steel (1921)
- Greater Than Love (1921)
- Their Mutual Child (1921)
- Two Kinds of Women (1922)
- The Sign of the Rose (1922)
- The Hottentot (1922)
- When Knights Were Cold (1923)
- Breaking Into Society (1923)
- Blow Your Own Horn (1923)
- No More Women (1924)
- The Yankee Consul (1924)
- Broadway or Bust (1924)
- Laughing at Danger (1924)
- Ridin' Pretty (1925)
- Madame Behave (1925)
- Women's Wares (1927)
