= The Stolen Play =

- Directed by: Harry Harvey
- Written by: H.M. Horkheimer; E.D. Horkheimer
- Starring: Ruth Roland; Ed Brady; William Conklin
- Production company: Balboa Amusement Producing Company
- Release date: August 31, 1917 (USA)

The Stolen Play is a 1917 silent film directed by Harry Harvey from a script by the Horkheimer brothers for their Balboa Amusement Producing Company (a.k.a. Falcon Features).

== Plot ==
A blind playwright is engaged to his assistant, and the two are close to completion of a new play, which is so dark and morbid that they find themselves on the brink of breakdowns. A greedy agent who has admired the playwright's previous work will stop at nothing to secure the play for himself.

== Cast ==
- Ruth Roland as Sylvia Smalley
- Ed Brady as Leroux
- William Conklin as Charles Edmay
- Makoto Inokuchi as Togo
