= Six Days (1923 film) =

1923 silent film

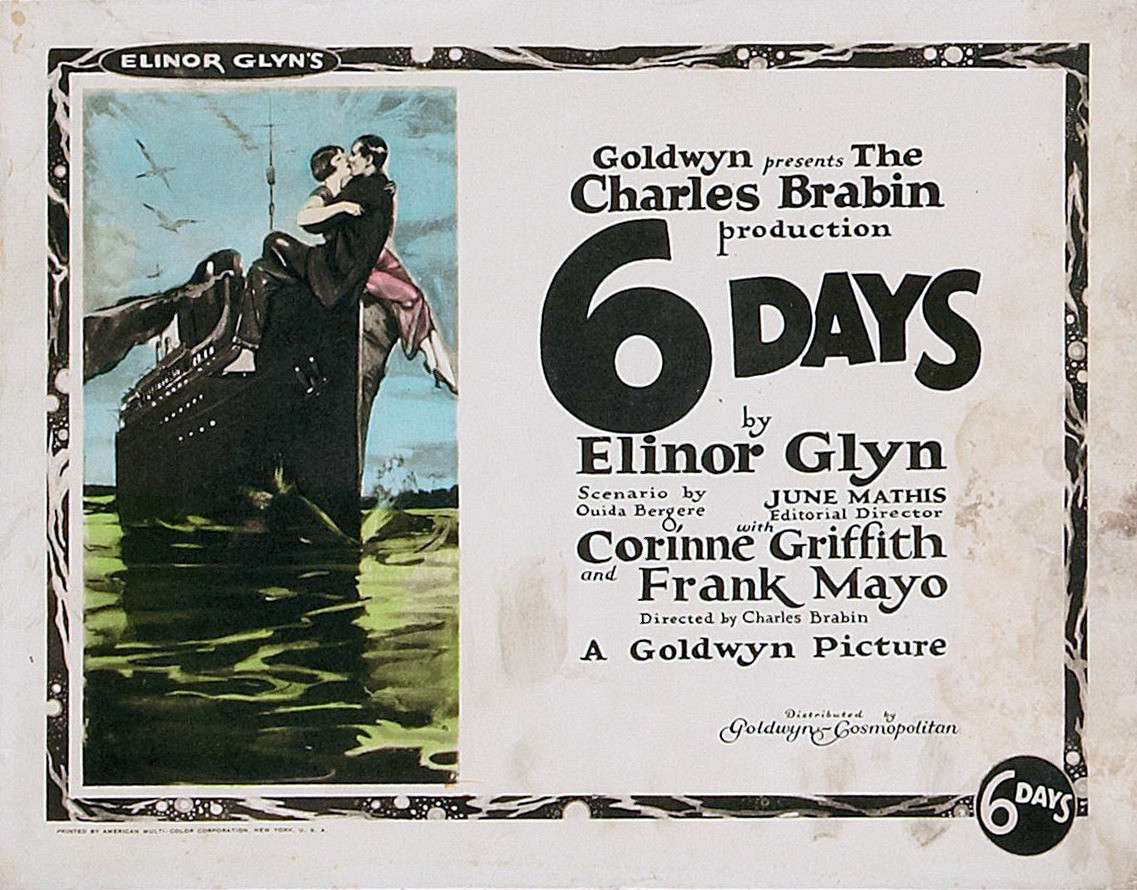
- Directed by: Charles Brabin
- Written by: Ouida Bergère
- Based on: Six Days by Elinor Glyn
- Starring: Corinne Griffith; Frank Mayo; Myrtle Stedman
- Cinematography: John J. Mescall
- Production company: Goldwyn Pictures
- Distributed by: Goldwyn Pictures
- Release date: September 9, 1923
- Running time: 90 minutes
- Country: United States
- Languages: Silent; English intertitles

Six Days is a 1923 American silent drama film directed by Charles Brabin and starring Corinne Griffith, Frank Mayo and Myrtle Stedman. It is based on a novel of the same title by Elinor Glyn.

== Cast ==
- Corinne Griffith as Laline Kingston
- Frank Mayo as Dion Leslie
- Myrtle Stedman as Olive Kingston
- Claude King as Lord Charles Chetwyn
- Maude George as Clara Leslie
- Spottiswoode Aitken as Pere Jerome
- Charles Clary as Richard Kingston
- Evelyn Walsh Hall as Hon. Emily Tarrant-Chetwyn
- Paul Cazeneuve as Chef
- Jack Herbert as Guide
- Robert DeVilbiss as young Dion Leslie, aged 6

== Preservation ==
A 35mm six-reel version of the film is extant in Lobster Films' collection in Paris. A complete nine-reel version is not known to exist in any archive.

== Bibliography ==
- Munden, Kenneth White. The American Film Institute Catalog of Motion Pictures Produced in the United States, Part 1. University of California Press, 1997.
