= No More Women (1924 film) =

1924 silent film

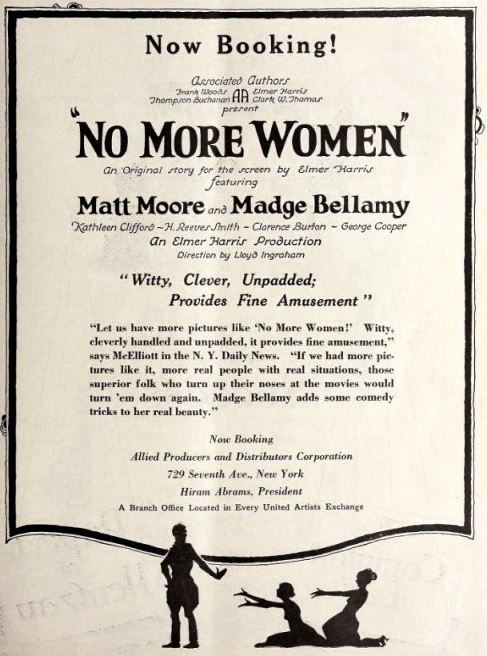
- Advertisement
- Directed by: Lloyd Ingraham
- Written by: Elmer Harris
- Produced by: Elmer Harris
- Starring: Matt Moore; Madge Bellamy; Kathleen Clifford
- Production company: Associated Authors
- Distributed by: Allied Producers & Distributors Corporation
- Release date: February 15, 1924
- Running time: 68 minutes
- Country: United States
- Language: Silent (English intertitles)

No More Women is a 1924 American silent comedy film directed by Lloyd Ingraham and starring Matt Moore, Madge Bellamy, and Kathleen Clifford.

== Plot ==
As described in a film magazine review, Peter Maddox, a poor but capable geologist, is disappointed in love. He vows, "no more women." Wealthy Peggy Van Dyke decides that she will marry him. She follows him to his camp, pretends that she is ill, and removes a necessary part of his automobile engine to keep him with her. When she falls asleep, he leaves. Thieves seize her, so her dog goes after Peter. He returns and rescues her. He then declares his love for Peggy.

== Cast ==
- Matt Moore as Peter Maddox
- Madge Bellamy as Peggy Van Dyke
- Kathleen Clifford as Daisy Crenshaw
- Clarence Burton as 'Beef' Hogan
- George Cooper as Tex
- H. Reeves-Smith as Howard Van Dyke
- Stanhope Wheatcroft as Randolph Parker
- Georgia Hale as Marjorie

== Production ==
Exteriors for No More Women were taken on location at Lake Arrowhead, California.

== Bibliography ==
- Munden, Kenneth White. The American Film Institute Catalog of Motion Pictures Produced in the United States, Part 1. University of California Press, 1997.
