= The Tiger Man =

1918 film

- Directed by: William S. Hart
- Screenplay by: J.G. Hawks
- Produced by: William S. Hart; Thomas H. Ince
- Starring: William S. Hart; Jane Novak; Milton Ross; Robert Lawrence; Charles K. French; J. P. Lockney
- Cinematography: Joseph H. August
- Production companies: Famous Players–Lasky Corporation; Artcraft Pictures Corporation; William S. Hart Productions
- Distributed by: Paramount Pictures
- Release date: April 1, 1918
- Running time: 50 minutes
- Country: United States
- Languages: Silent; English intertitles

The Tiger Man is a 1918 American silent Western film directed by William S. Hart, written by J.G. Hawks, and starring William S. Hart, Jane Novak, Milton Ross, Robert Lawrence, Charles K. French, and J. P. Lockney. It was released on April 1, 1918, by Paramount Pictures. A print of the film is in the Museum of Modern Art.

== Plot ==
As described in a film magazine, Hawk Parsons, escaping a sheriff's posse, comes upon Ruth Ingram and a group of missionaries on their way to the frontier. The band is attacked by Indians and Parsons assists them until he sees the approaching cavalry, so he demands that the band sell Ruth for their freedom. Ruth agrees and leaves her sick husband so that the others might be saved. Through the innocence of the young woman Parsons finds his better self and returns her to her little party and husband, and then gives himself up to the cavalry.

== Cast ==
- William S. Hart as Hawk Parsons
- Jane Novak as Ruth Ingram
- Milton Ross as Connor Moore
- Robert Lawrence as Reverend Luke Ingram
- Charles K. French as Sheriff Sandy Martin
- J. P. Lockney as Dick Hawkins

== Preservation status ==
A copy is preserved in the Museum of Modern Art, New York.

== Reception ==
Like many American films of the time, The Tiger Man was subject to cuts by city and state film censorship boards. For example, the Chicago Board of Censors required a cut, in Reel 1, of all scenes of Hawk holding up the sheriff and his deputies, Hawk backing up sheriff and deputies into prison cell, view of Hawk outside prison cell and sheriff and deputies inside cell, Reel 3, the four intertitles "Them devils will close in on us with the dark — do you still say take her?", "The knife wasn't for you", "It was for myself when the time came", and "The passing of the brute — the birth of the man before the unafraid eyes of chastity", view of arrow lodging in man's shoulder, two closeups of young woman standing in doorway of bedroom frightened, the four intertitles "She's an angel from heaven, as pure as the day you sold her", "She's an angel of heaven, as pure as the day she came away", "She's the same good woman she was out there", and "Look at me, you'll see I'm not lying", and inserted the intertitles "The devils will close in the dark — I'm not taking any chances — she'll have to come with me as a hostage — you put the sheriff on my trail" and "It's a lie — she surrendered to me as a hostage".
