= Below the Deadline (1921 film) =

1921 film directed by J. P. McGowan

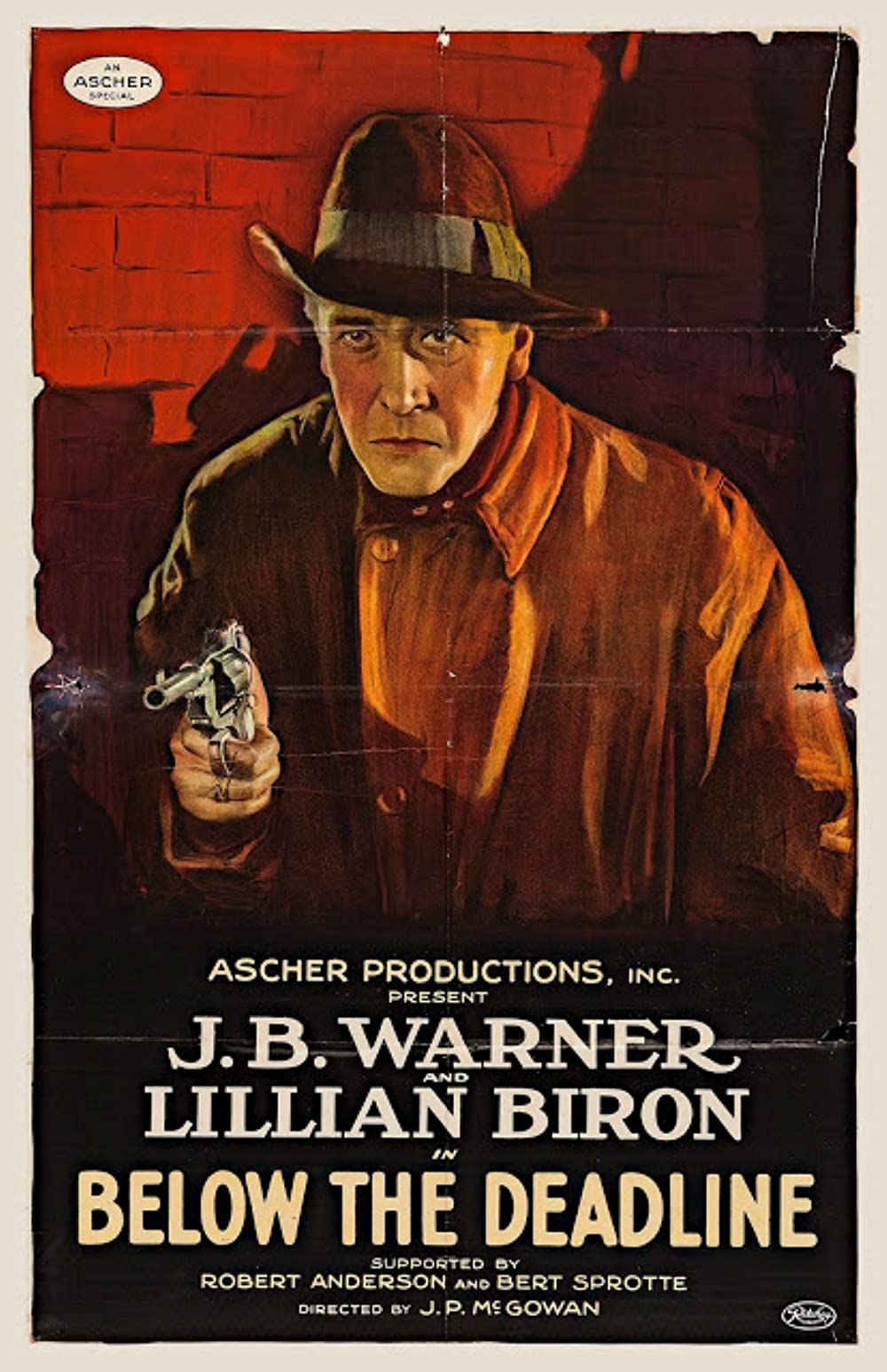
- Directed by: J.P. McGowan
- Written by: Arthur Henry Gooden
- Produced by: Oscar Jacobs
- Starring: Lillian Biron; Bert Sprotte; Robert Anderson
- Production companies: Ascher Productions; Oscar Jacobs Productions
- Distributed by: Ascher Productions
- Release date: November 6, 1921
- Running time: 50 minutes
- Country: United States
- Languages: Silent; English intertitles

Below the Deadline is a 1921 American silent crime film directed by J.P. McGowan and starring Lillian Biron, Bert Sprotte and Robert Anderson.

== Cast ==
- J.B. Warner as Joe Donovan
- Lillian Biron as Alice Elliot
- Bert Sprotte as Buck Elliot
- Robert Anderson as Hot Dog Heine

== Bibliography ==
- Munden, Kenneth White. The American Film Institute Catalog of Motion Pictures Produced in the United States, Part 1. University of California Press, 1997.
