= Gloria Joy =

American actress (1910–1970)

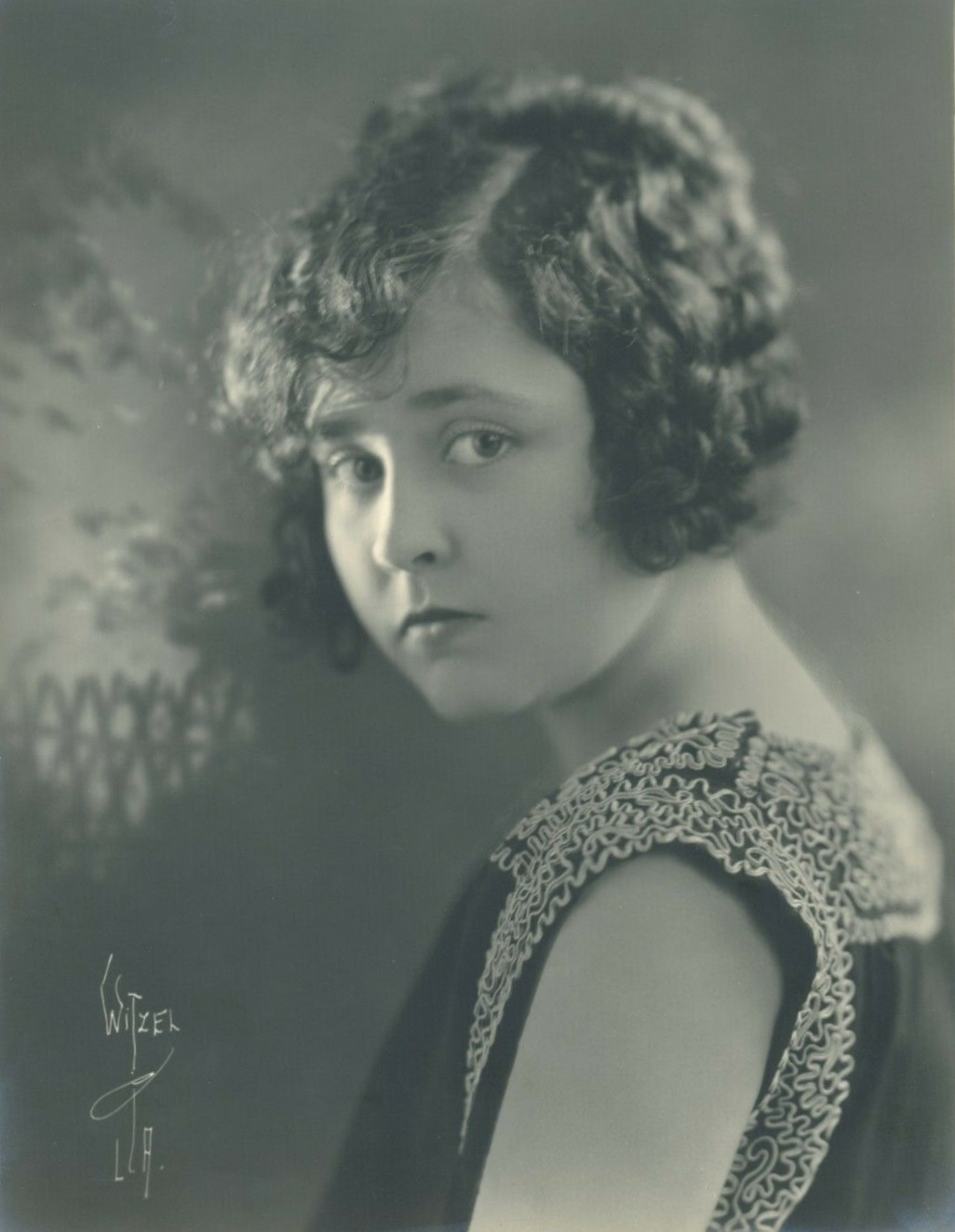
- Joy c. 1920
- Born: Corrine Louise Johnson; October 7, 1910; Los Angeles, California, U.S.
- Died: January 25, 1970 (aged 59); Los Angeles County, California, U.S.
- Other names: Gloria Backus
- Occupation: Actress
- Years active: 1918–1934

Gloria Joy (born Corrine Louise Johnson; October 7, 1910 – January 25, 1970) was an American actress whose career began at age seven in 1918 during the silent film era. She mostly performed as a child actress from the late 1910s, through the 1920s, before retiring from the industry in 1934.

== Early life and career ==
Gloria Joy was born Corrine Louise Johnson in Los Angeles, California to Oral Lavon and Louise Corinne (née Gordon) Johnson. She began her career in the film industry at age seven when her stepfather, Sherwood MacDonald, formed Mission Productions in the autumn of 1918 to produce a series of films showcasing Joy as a child actress. The first of the series was The Fortunes of Connie, released by Pathé on 22 December of that year.

Joy would go on to appear in films – often in starring roles directed by MacDonald – throughout the late 1910s and 1920s. Joy would appear in approximately twenty-five films before retiring from acting in 1934.

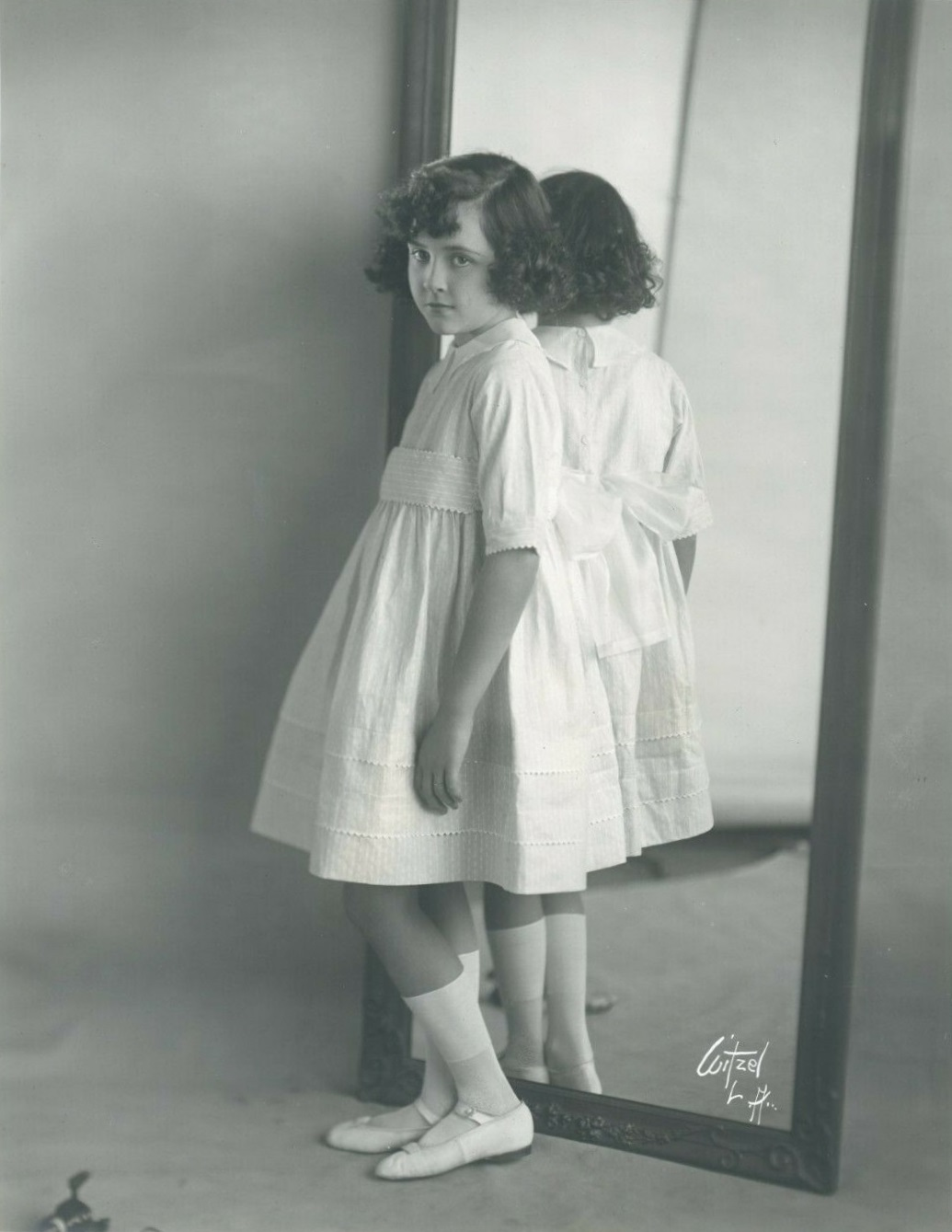
Joy c. 1920

Gloria Joy died in 1970, aged 59, and was interred at the San Gabriel Cemetery in San Gabriel, Los Angeles County, California.

== Selected filmography ==
- The Locked Heart (1918)
- The Talk of the Town (1918)
- The Heart of Humanity (1918)
- An Old Fashioned Boy (1920)
- The Girl from Rocky Point (1922)
- Lariats and Six-Shooters (1931)
- Passport to Paradise (1932)
