= John F. Seitz =

American cinematographer and inventor (1892–1979)

- Born: John Francis Seitz; June 23, 1892; Chicago, Illinois, U.S.
- Died: February 27, 1979 (aged 86); Woodland Hills, California, U.S.
- Resting place: Holy Cross Cemetery
- Occupations: Cinematographer and Inventor
- Years active: 1916–1960
- Spouse: Marie Boyle (m. 1934)
- Children: 2

John Francis Seitz, A.S.C. (June 23, 1892 – February 27, 1979) was an American cinematographer and inventor.

He was nominated for seven Academy Awards.

== Career ==
His Hollywood career began in 1909 as a lab assistant with the Essanay Film Manufacturing Company in Chicago. He worked as a lab technician for the American Film Manufacturing Company (known as Flying A), also in Chicago.

Seitz got his first chance to establish himself as lead cameraman in 1916, and he achieved great success with the director Rex Ingram, most famously on the Rudolph Valentino film The Four Horsemen of the Apocalypse (1921).

Highly regarded by director Billy Wilder, Seitz worked with him on the films noir Double Indemnity (1944), The Lost Weekend (1945), and Sunset Boulevard (1950), receiving Academy Award nominations for each.

During his career, he received seven nominations for Academy Award for Best Cinematography. In 1929, he served as president of the American Society of Cinematographers (A.S.C.) for one year, and he had been a member since 1923. The A.S.C. named the 2002 Heritage Award after Seitz.

Seitz retired in 1960 and devoted himself to photographic inventions for which he held 18 patents. An example of a Seitz invention is the matte shot: a large painting is photographed separately and later added to a scene to expand it, add effects, and/or create a sense of depth in backgrounds. He also was noted for his innovations with low-key lighting, which enhanced the film noir style. A widower, he married screenwriter Marie Boyle in 1934 who raised his daughter Margaret Alice Marhoefer and later gave birth to a son, John Lawrence Seitz.

Seitz is buried in the Holy Cross Cemetery.

== Filmography ==
- The Quagmire (1916)
- The Ranger of Lonesome Gulch (1916)
- The Bride's Silence (1917)
- The Serpent's Tooth (1917)
- Whose Wife? (1917)
- A Game of Wits (1917)
- The Mate of the Sally Ann (1917)
- Souls in Pawn (1917)
- Up Romance Road (1918)
- Beauty and the Rogue (1918)
- Powers That Prey (1918)
- The Westerners (1919)
- Hearts Are Trumps (1920)
- The Sagebrusher (1920)
- Shore Acres (1920)
- Uncharted Seas (1921)
- The Conquering Power (1921)
- The Four Horsemen of the Apocalypse (1921)
- The Prisoner of Zenda (1922)
- Trifling Women (1922)
- Turn to the Right (1922)
- Where the Pavement Ends (1923)
- Scaramouche (1923)
- The Arab (1924)
- Classmates (1924)
- The Price of a Party (1924)
- Mare Nostrum (1926)
- The Magician (1926)
- The Fair Co-Ed (1927)
- Across to Singapore (1928)
- The Trail of '98 (1928)
- Outcast (1928)
- The Patsy (1928)
- Adoration (1928)
- The Painted Angel (1929)
- The Squall (1929)
- A Most Immoral Lady (1929)
- Hard to Get (1929)
- Careers (1929)
- Her Private Life (1929)
- The Divine Lady (1929)
- Saturday's Children (1929)
- In the Next Room (1930)
- Back Pay (1930)
- Sweethearts and Wives (1930)
- Murder Will Out (1930)
- The Bad Man (1930)
- Road to Paradise (1930)
- Kismet (1930)
- East Lynne (1931)
- Merely Mary Ann (1931)
- Misbehaving Ladies (1931)
- Hush Money (1931)
- Men of the Sky (1931)
- Young Sinners (1931)
- The Age for Love (1931)
- The Right of Way (1931)
- Over the Hill (1931)
- Careless Lady (1932)
- The Woman in Room 13 (1932)
- A Passport to Hell (1932)
- She Wanted a Millionaire (1932)
- Six Hours to Live (1932)
- Mr. Skitch (1933)
- Paddy the Next Best Thing (1933)
- Ladies They Talk About (1933)
- Dangerously Yours (1933)
- Adorable (1933)
- Marie Galante (1934)
- Springtime for Henry (1934)
- All Men Are Enemies (1934)
- Coming Out Party (1934)
- Helldorado (1934)
- Curly Top (1935)
- Navy Wife (1935)
- Our Little Girl (1935)
- Redheads on Parade (1935)
- The Littlest Rebel (1935)
- One More Spring (1935)
- The Country Doctor (1936)
- 15 Maiden Lane (1936)
- Poor Little Rich Girl (1936)
- Captain January (1936)
- Madame X (1937)
- Between Two Women (1937)
- Carnival in Paris (1937)
- Navy Blue and Gold (1937)
- Love Is a Headache (1938)
- A Christmas Carol (1938)
- Lord Jeff (1938)
- Stablemates (1938)
- Young Dr. Kildare (1938)
- The Crowd Roars (1938)
- The Adventure of Huckleberry Finn (1939)
- The Hardys Ride High (1939)
- Thunder Afloat (1939)
- Bad Little Angel (1939)
- Sergeant Madden (1939)
- 6,000 Enemies (1939)
- A Little Bit of Heaven (1940)
- Dr. Kildare's Strange Case (1940)
- Dr. Kildare's Crisis (1940)
- Sullivan's Travels (1941)
- Fly-By-Night (1942)
- This Gun for Hire (1942)
- Lucky Jordan (1942)
- The Moon and Sixpence (1942)
- Five Graves to Cairo (1943)
- Casanova Brown (1944)
- The Hour Before the Dawn (1944)
- The Miracle of Morgan's Creek (1944)
- Hail the Conquering Hero (1944)
- Double Indemnity (1944)
- The Unseen (1945)
- The Lost Weekend (1945)
- Home Sweet Homicide (1946)
- The Well-Groomed Bride (1946)
- The Imperfect Lady (1947)
- Calcutta (1947)
- Wild Harvest (1947)
- Saigon (1948)
- On Our Merry Way (1948)
- Night Has a Thousand Eyes (1948)
- The Big Clock (1948)
- Beyond Glory (1948)
- Chicago Deadline (1949)
- The Great Gatsby (1949)
- Sunset Boulevard (1950)
- Captain Carey, U.S.A. (1950)
- Molly (1950)
- Appointment with Danger (1951)
- When Worlds Collide (1951)
- Dear Brat (1951)
- The Iron Mistress (1952)
- The Savage (1952)
- The San Francisco Story (1952)
- Invaders from Mars (1953)
- Botany Bay (1953)
- Desert Legion (1953)
- Fort Algiers (1953)
- The Rocket Man (1954)
- Rogue Cop (1954)
- Saskatchewan (1954)
- Many Rivers to Cross (1955)
- The McConnell Story (1955)
- Hell on Frisco Bay (1956)
- A Cry in the Night (1956)
- The Big Land (1956)
- Santiago (1956)
- The Deep Six (1958)
- The Badlanders (1958)
- The Man in the Net (1959)
- Island of Lost Women (1959)
- Guns of the Timberland (1960)

== Accolades ==
- Look Magazine Award: Cinematography The Lost Weekend; 1946
- ASC Monthly Film Award: Sunset Blvd.; August 1950
- George Eastman House Medal of Honor: (Outstanding Contribution to the Art of Motion Pictures 1915–1925); 1955

Nominations

- Academy Awards: Oscar, Best Cinematography, The Divine Lady; 1930. Note: No official nominees had been announced this year.
- Academy Awards: Oscar, Cinematography, Black-and-White, Five Graves to Cairo; 1944.
- Academy Awards: Oscar, Best Cinematography, Black-and-White, Double Indemnity; 1945.
- Academy Awards: Oscar, Best Cinematography, Black-and-White, The Lost Weekend; 1946.
- Academy Awards: Oscar, Best Cinematography, Black-and-White; Sunset Blvd.; 1951.
- Golden Globes: Golden Globe Award, Best Cinematography, Black and White, Sunset Blvd.; 1951.
- Academy Awards: Oscar, Best Cinematography, Color; When Worlds Collide, shared with: W. Howard Greene; 1952.
- Academy Awards: Oscar, Best Cinematography, Black-and-White; Rogue Cop; 1955.
