= Souls in Pawn =

Souls in Pawn may refer to:

- Souls in Pawn (1917 film), an American silent spy-drama film
- Souls in Pawn (1940 film), an American drama film
