= Go Straight =

Go Straight may refer to:

- Go Straight (1921 film), directed by William Worthington
- Go Straight (1925 film), directed by Frank O'Connor
