= St. Peter's Cemetery (Lewiston, Maine) =

Roman Catholic cemetery in Androscoggin County, Maine

St. Peter's Cemetery of Lewiston
- Interactive map of St. Peter's Cemetery of Lewiston

Details
- Established: 1876
- Location: Lewiston, Maine
- Country: United States
- Coordinates: 44°08′45″N 70°12′02″W
- Owned by: Roman Catholic Diocese of Portland
- Size: 150 acres (60 ha)
- No. of graves: >45,000
- Website: Official website
- Find a Grave: St. Peter's Cemetery of Lewiston

St. Peter's Cemetery (formerly the French Cemetery or Le Cimietière de la Congrégation Canadienne) is a cemetery in Lewiston, Maine. Located on 150 acres (60 ha) of land, it was officially consecrated in 1876. It is operated by the Roman Catholic Diocese of Portland. A number of burials occurred in the cemetery prior to its official inception in 1876 and over 45,000 burials have taken place since. In 1952, the cemetery was expanded by 24 acres (10 ha) with the purchase of a nearby farm.

== Notable interments ==
- Lew Cody (1884–1934), Actor
- Eleven victims of the Lacoste Babies Home fire
