= Masquers Club =

The Masquers Club is a private social club for actors in Los Angeles, California. It was created in 1925 by actors from New York City who had left Broadway to act in motion pictures. It was similar to the Lambs Club in New York. The Club produced thirteen short subjects, the most famous of which, The Stolen Jools, featured seven Oscar-winning performers. Raymond Griffith died there in 1957.

== Filmography ==
- Stolen by Gypsies or Beer and Bicycles (1933)
- The Moonshiner's Daughter (1933)
- Lost in Limehouse (1933)
- Thru Thin and Thicket, or Who's Zoo in Africa (1933)
- The Bride's Bereavement; or, The Snake in the Grass (1932)
- Two Lips and Juleps; or, Southern Love and Northern Exposure (1932)
- The Engineer's Daughter; or, Iron Minnie's Revenge (1932)
- Rule 'Em and Weep (1932)
- The Wide Open Spaces (1931)
- The Great Junction Hotel (1931)
- Oh! Oh! Cleopatra (1931)
- Stout Hearts and Willing Hands (1931)
- The Stolen Jools (1931)
