= The Bride's Silence =

1917 silent film by Henry King

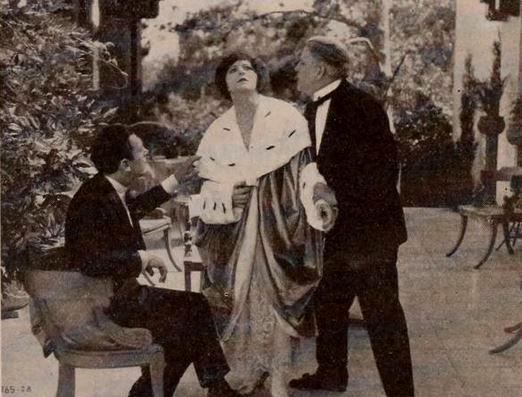
- Advertisement
- Directed by: Henry King
- Written by: Daniel F. Whitcomb
- Starring: Gail Kane; Lew Cody; Henry A. Barrows
- Cinematography: John F. Seitz
- Production company: American Film Company
- Distributed by: Mutual Film
- Release date: September 10, 1917
- Running time: 50 minutes
- Country: United States
- Languages: Silent; English intertitles

The Bride's Silence is a 1917 American silent mystery film directed by Henry King and starring Gail Kane, Lew Cody, and Henry A. Barrows.

== Cast ==
- Gail Kane as Syllvia Standish
- Lew Cody as Paul Wagner
- Henry A. Barrows as Nathan Standish
- Jim Farley as Bull Ziegler
- Robert Klein as Bobbins
- Ashton Dearholt as Ford

== Bibliography ==
- Donald W. McCaffrey & Christopher P. Jacobs. Guide to the Silent Years of American Cinema. Greenwood Publishing, 1999. ISBN 0-313-30345-2
