= The Fires of Conscience =

1916 film by Oscar Apfel

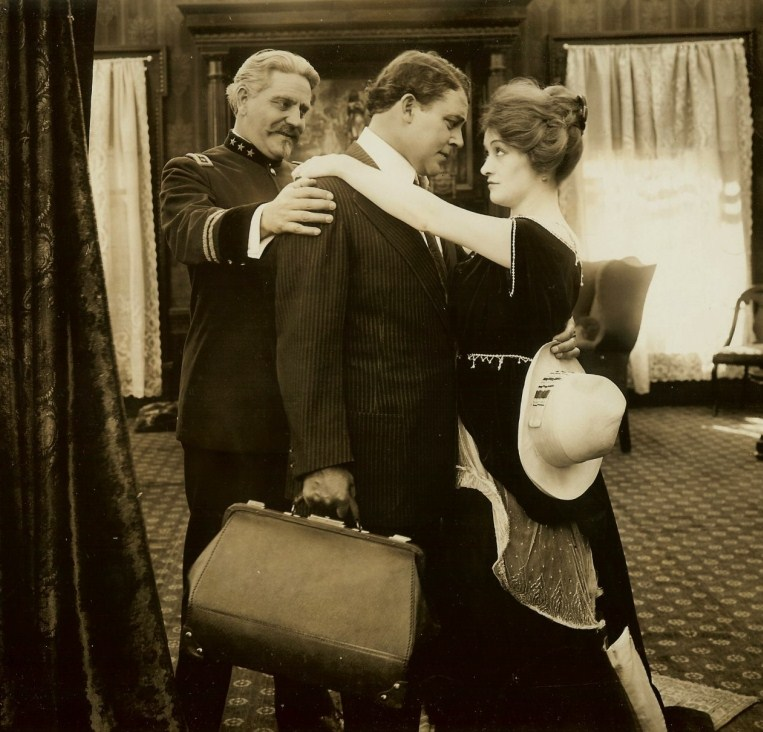
- Film still showing (from right) actors Brockwell, Farnum, and Barrows
- Directed by: Oscar Apfel
- Written by: Henry Christeen Warnack
- Produced by: William Fox
- Starring: William Farnum; Gladys Brockwell
- Distributed by: Fox Film Corporation
- Release date: 25 September 1916
- Running time: 60 min
- Country: United States
- Language: Silent (English intertitles)

The Fires of Conscience is a lost 1916 American silent drama film directed by Oscar Apfel and starring William Farnum. It was produced and released by the Fox Film Corporation.

== Cast ==
- William Farnum as George Baxter
- Gladys Brockwell as Margery Burke
- Nell Shipman as Nell Blythe
- Henry A. Barrows as Robert Baxter
- Henry Hebert as Paul Sneed
- William Burress as Randolf Sneed
- Elinor Fair as Mabel Jones
- Willard Louis as Doc Taylor
- Brooklyn Keller as Felix Lunk
- Fred Huntley as Peter Rogers

== See also ==
- 1937 Fox vault fire
