= Gail Kane =

American actress

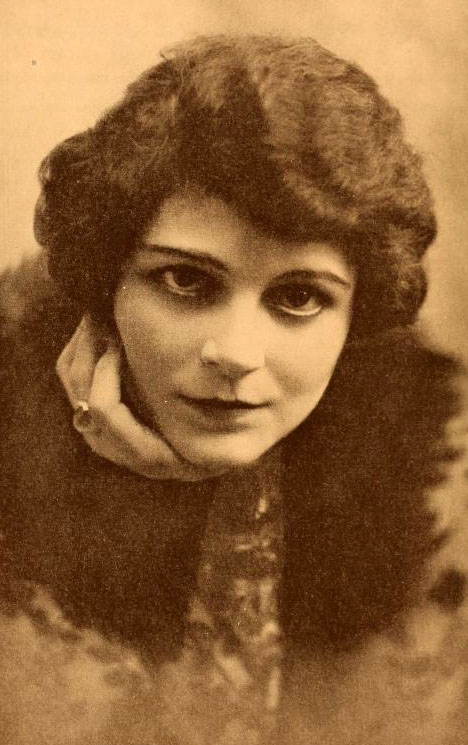
- Kane in 1917
- Born: Abigail Kane; July 10, 1885; Philadelphia, Pennsylvania, U.S.
- Died: February 17, 1966 (aged 80); Augusta, Maine, U.S.
- Occupation: Actress
- Years active: 1914–1927
- Spouse: Henry Iden Ottman (m. 1920; died 1939)
- Children: 1

Gail Kane (born Abigail Kane; July 10, 1885 – February 17, 1966) was an American stage and silent movie actress.

== Early years ==
Kane was born in Philadelphia, Pennsylvania. She attended a private school in Newburgh, New York, but eschewed additional education to become an actress. She became a dedicated student of the art of pantomime. She stood 5'7" tall, weighed 142 pounds, and had dark brown hair and eyes.

== Theatrical actress ==
Kane performed at the Lyceum Theatre in Heap Game Watch in January 1914. She had a significant role in Seven Keys To Baldpate Astor, which was staged at the Gaiety Theatre, London, in May 1914. The comedy was brought to the stage by George M. Cohan. She paired with George Nash in The Miracle Man at the Astor Theatre. The play was produced on Broadway in the fall of 1914.

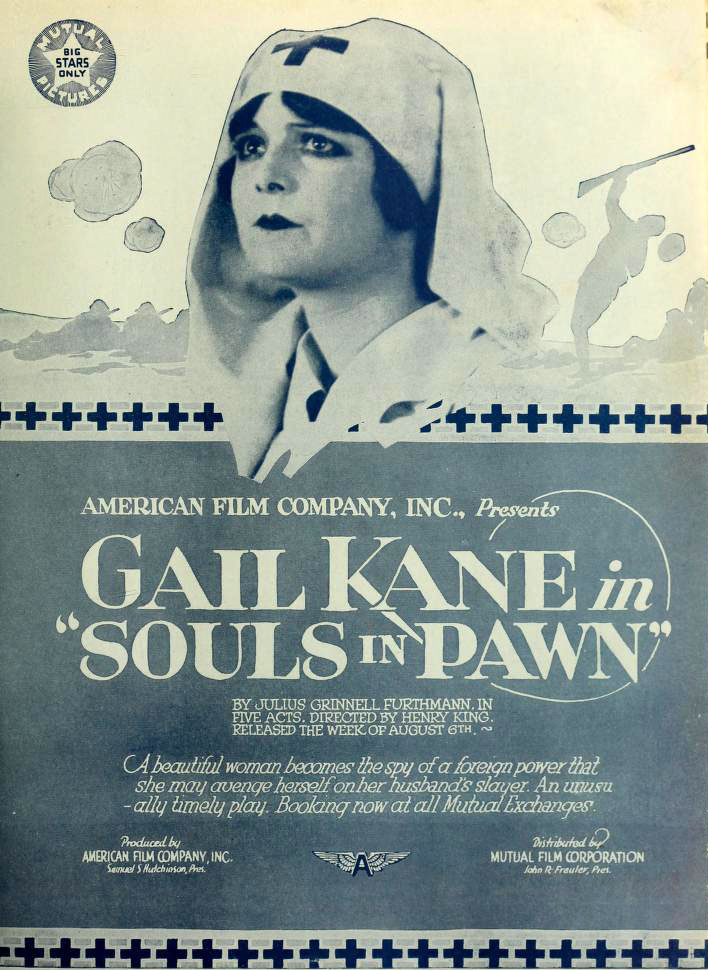
Souls in Pawn (1917)

Kane acted in a presentation of The Hyphen Knickerbocker in April 1915. She returned to the stage at the Broadhurst Theatre in July 1920. She was paired with Earle Fox, another actor who had been spending much of his time in movies. They appeared in the comedy Come Seven. The production was an adaptation by Octavus Roy Cohen of stories he had contributed to The Saturday Evening Post. The play was the first ever featuring an entirely caucasian cast in black face.

Lawful Larceny (1922) was a comedy written by Samuel Shipman. It was presented at the Republic Theater, built by Oscar Hammerstein in 1900, at 42nd Street. The players included Kane, Margaret Lawrence, Ida Waterman, and Lowell Sherman.

The Breaking Point by Mary Roberts Rinehart was staged at the Klaw Theatre, West 45th Street, New York City, in August 1923. The plot concerned amnesia with the setting (fiction) moving from New York to Wyoming and back. Kane, Regina Wallace, Reginald Barlow, and McKay Morris were the principal actors in the drama.

She played Ellen Halpin in the 1925 comedy Loggerheads at the Cherry Lane Theatre. The Booth Theatre produced Paid, written by Sam Forrest, in November 1925. Kane portrayed Mrs John Ramsey in a play which endured for twenty-one performances.

== Arrest ==
Kane was arrested following a performance of The Captive at the Empire Theater on Broadway in February 1927. The production was considered indecent and a violation of Section 1140A of the New York City Criminal Code for its depiction of homosexuality, although the play had been tried and acquitted of immorality a short time earlier by a citizen's play jury. It was in its fifth month of production.

Forty-one arrests were made in total. Two other productions were raided on the same night. They were Sex, playing at Daly's 63rd St. Theater, and The Virgin Man, which was being performed before an audience at the Princess Theater. Among the actors taken to Night Court were Basil Rathbone, Helen Menken, Ann Trevor, Winifred Fraser, John Miltern, and Arthur Lewis. Menken was comforted by Kane as she made her exit after becoming agitated by the glares and explosions of cameras snapping as she stepped out on the sidewalk. "Please make them stop," Menken reportedly exclaimed. Also arrested was Mae West, the star of Sex, and twenty others among a cast of fifty. Authorities promised to repeat the arrests if the plays were not withdrawn or modified to comply with the criminal code.

== Movie career ==
Kane's movie career spanned much of the silent era, beginning with a role as Bonita Canby, in Arizona (1913). In the western she had the third lead, portraying the unfaithful wife of a U.S. Cavalry officer. She co-starred as Jurgis Rudkus's (played by George Nash) wife Ona Lukoszaite in the film adaptation of Upton Sinclair's The Jungle (1914). She starred in Via Wireless (1915) which was adapted from a play by Winchell Smith and Paul Armstrong. The story describes the competition between two men in the invention of a new naval gun. A wealthy man becomes the rival of one of the inventors for the affection of the daughter of an ironmaster. As Frances Durant, Kane is finally given a part worthy of her skill as an actress. One critic described her as a diamond set in brass in her previous films.

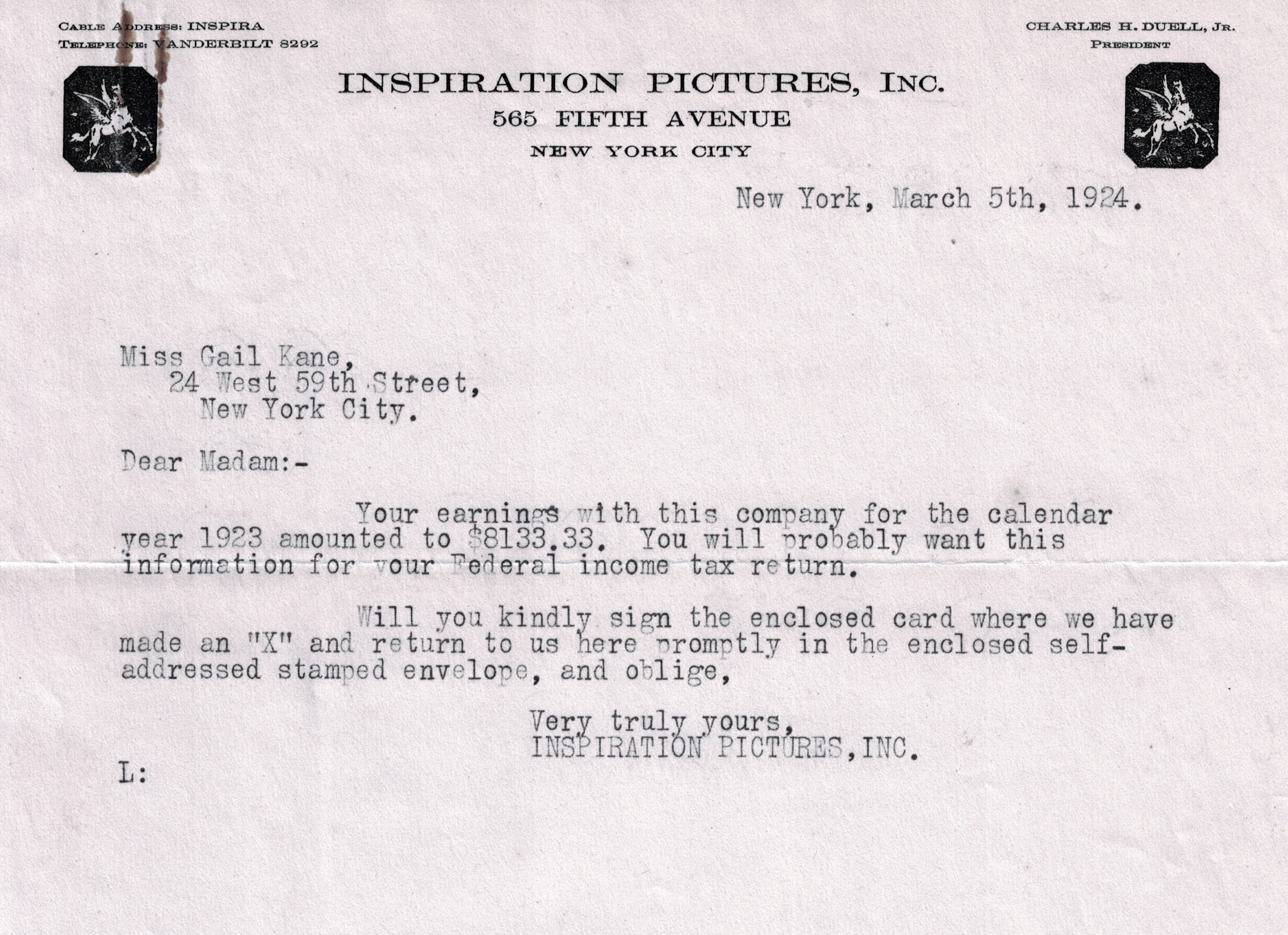
Letter from Inspiration Pictures Inc. informing Gail Kane of her 1923 earnings for The White Sister'

Kane was employed by the Mutual Film Corporation of Santa Barbara, California when she made The Upper Crust (1917). Produced by Mutual-American, Edward Pell is cast as Kane's leading man in a comedy replete with humor. Kane is a young Irish woman named Molly O'Toole. She impersonates a wealthy dowager and succeeds in her ruse long enough to enjoy herself and eventually marry the dowager's son.

In July 1917 Kane joined an effort organized by William A. Brady, President of the National Association of the Motion Picture Industry, and D.W. Griffith. Their task was to utilize film as a tool of information regarding the plans and purposes of the United States in World War I. Brady was appointed by President Woodrow Wilson to mobilize the motion-picture industry. Kane was assigned to the Food Commission. In addition to Mutual she was associated with Metro Pictures, Pathé, and World. Kane filed a suit against Mutual in 1918, asking $33,500 for alleged breach of contract.

The Scarlet Oath (1917) was a challenging movie for Kane who played the dual role of two women. A Game of Wits (1917) is a five-reel comedy with Kane portraying Jeannette Browning in a unique love story.

She continued to act in motion pictures for another decade. Among her later movies are Love's Law (1918), The Daredevil (1918), Someone Must Pay (1919), Romeo's Dad (1919), Empty Arms (1920), Idle Hands (1921), The White Sister (1923), and Convoy (1927).

== Marriage ==
Kane's husband, Henry Iden Ottman, died in January 1939. Ottman was born in New York City in 1880, the son of William Ottman and Christine Iden. Ottman moved to Augusta, Maine in 1921. Kane and Ottman had a son, William Kane Ottman.

== Private life ==
She owned a collection of scarab beetles considered to be one of the finest in America in 1917. The most valuable of the Scarabaeus sacer is said to have been removed from the tomb of an Egyptian princess of the 2nd Ptolemaic dynasty. Archaeologists believe it to be one of a number issued to illustrate the doctrine of the resurrection. Kane was given her first scarab by Howard Estabrook, who played Adhemar de Gratignan in Divorcons (1913). Presented at the New York Playhouse, Kane portrayed Mme. de Brionne in the play written by the French dramatist Victorien Sardou. Estabrook purchased the scarab in India while he was touring.

She collected bathing suits. Kane possessed one of the most attractive collections of one-piece, two-piece, and fluffy ruffles seashore outfits in Chicago, Illinois by 1917. Each bathing suit was also designed by her.

== Death ==
Kane died in Augusta, Maine in 1966, aged 80.

== Filmography ==
- Arizona (1913)
- The Great Diamond Robbery (1914)
- The Jungle (1914)
- Dan (1914)
- The Pit (1914)
- Her Great Match (1915)
- Via Wireless (1915)
- The Labyrinth (1915)
- Playing the Price (1916)
- The Velvet Paw (1916)
- The Scarlet Oath (1916)
- The Heart of a Hero (1916)
- The Men She Married (1916)
- On Dangerous Ground (1917)
- The Red Woman (1917)
- As Man Made Her (1917)
- Whose Wife? (1917)
- The Serpent's Tooth (1917)
- The False Friend (1917)
- The Upper Crust (1917)
- Souls in Pawn (1917)
- The Bride's Silence (1917)
- Southern Pride (1917)
- A Game of Wits (1917)
- When Men Betray (1918)
- Love's Law (1918)
- The Daredevil (1918)
- Someone Must Pay (1919)
- Romeo's Dad (1919) (*short)
- Empty Arms (1920)
- Idle Hands (1921)
- Wise Husbands (1921)
- The White Sister (1923)
- Convoy (1927)
