= Cora Drew =

American silent film actress

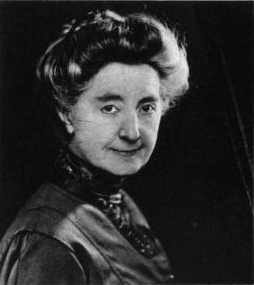
- in 1920
- Born: 1871/1872; U.S.
- Occupation: Actress

Cora Rankin Drew (born 1871 or 1872) was a silent film actress in the United States. Her performances included leading roles in The Burned Hand (1915), The Honor System (1917), and Southern Pride (1917). She expressed frustration with casting imbalances between men and women. In 1921, Canadian Moving Picture Digest included a favorable description of one of her performances.

== Filmography ==
- The Opened Shutters (1914)
- The Lily and the Rose (1915)
- The Burned Hand (1915)
- It's No Laughing Matter (1915)
- The Beachcomber (1915)
- Fit for Burning (1916)
- Where Are My Children? (1916)
- The Wood Nymph (1916)
- When a Man Sees Red (1917)
- The Honor System (1917)
- Southern Pride (1917)
- The Moral Law (1918)
- The Love Hunger (1919)
- The Prince of Avenue A (1920)
- The Kentucky Colonel (1920)
- Live and Let Live (1921)
- What's a Wife Worth? (1921)
- Go Straight (1921)
