= Lew Cody =

American actor (1884–1934)

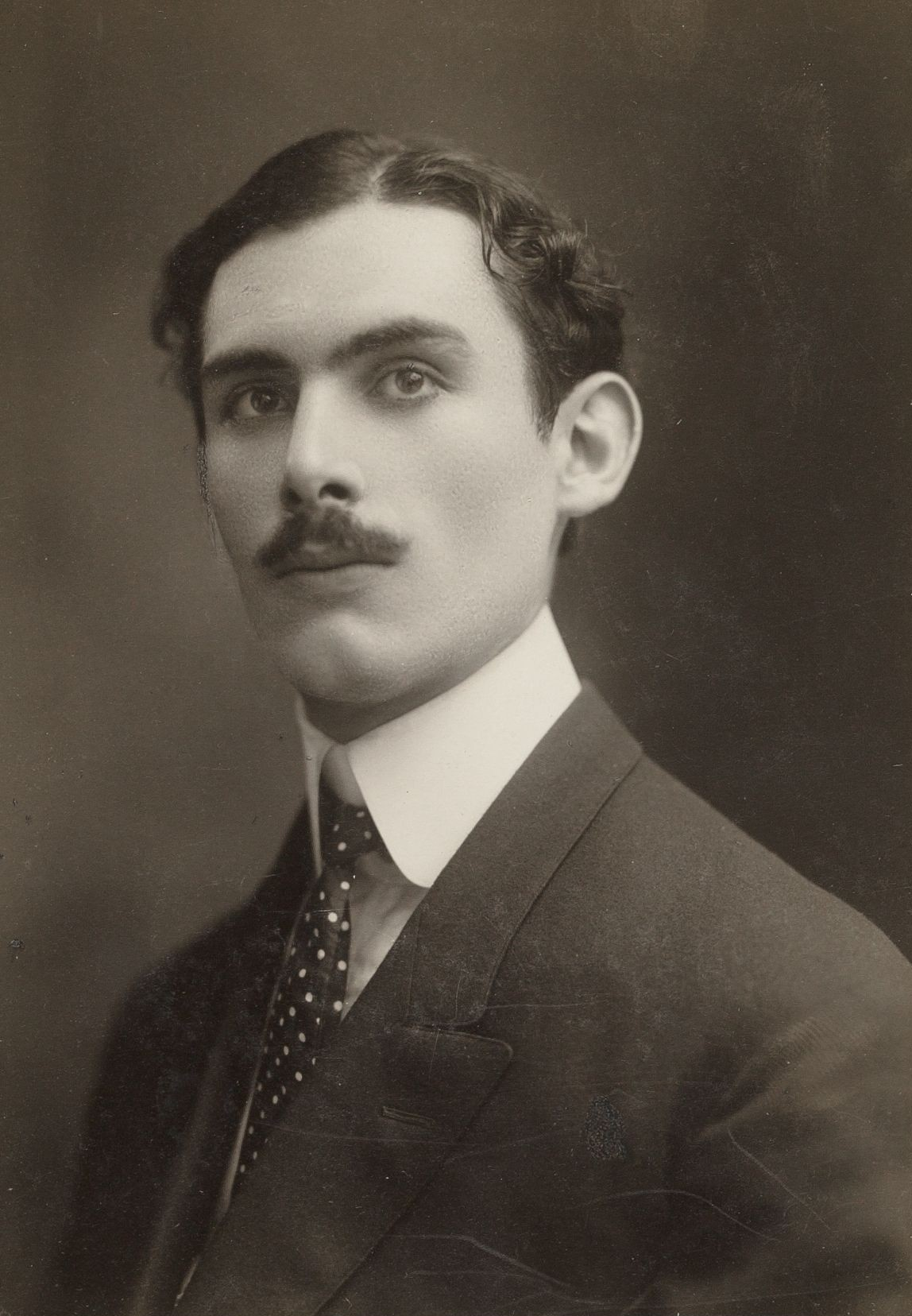
- Cody, c. 1915
- Born: Louis Joseph Côté; February 22, 1884; Waterville, Maine, U.S.
- Died: May 31, 1934 (aged 50); Beverly Hills, California, U.S.
- Resting place: St. Peter's Cemetery
- Education: McGill University
- Occupation: Actor
- Years active: 1907–1934
- Spouses: Dorothy Dalton (m. 1910; div. 1911) (m. 1913; div. 1914) Mabel Normand (m. 1926; died 1930)

Lew Cody (born Louis Joseph Côté; February 22, 1884 – May 31, 1934) was an American stage and film actor whose career spanned the silent film and early sound film age. He gained notoriety in the late 1910s for playing "male vamps" in films such as Don't Change Your Husband.

== Early life and career ==
Cody was born on February 22, 1884 (some sources say 1885) to Louis Joseph Côté and Elizabeth Sarah Côté (née Herbert). His father was French Canadian, with his ancestral lineage dating back to France and Germany, and his mother was a native of Maine. Cody and his younger brothers and sisters were born in Waterville, Maine. After Elizabeth's death, Louis remarried to Marie Lena Rose Toussaint, and they had a daughter named Cecile Côté.

The family moved to Berlin, New Hampshire, where Cody's father owned a drug store. In his youth, Cody worked at his father's drug store as a soda jerk. He later enrolled at McGill University in Montreal where he intended to study medicine but abandoned the idea of setting up in practice and joined a theatre stock company in North Carolina.

He made his debut on the stage in New York in Pierre of the Plains. Cody moved to Los Angeles and began a minor film career at The Balboa Film Studios with Thomas Ince. Cody had at least 99 film credits from 1914 to 1934.

== Personal life ==
Cody was married three times. His first two marriages were to actress Dorothy Dalton. They first married in 1910 and divorced in 1911. They remarried in 1913 and were divorced a second time in 1914. Playing the debonair leading man, Cody enjoyed the later single life of "a man's man", which added to his acting persona. In what may have been started as a mutual lark, Cody married Mabel Normand in 1926. Having pre-med schooling, Cody understood that Mabel had acute tuberculosis, so they lived separately and he attended all he possibly could to Mabel's comfort. They remained married until Normand's death from tuberculosis in February 1930.

== Death ==
After Mabel's passing, he successfully transitioned into talking pictures and to even better roles. On May 31, 1934, Cody died of a sudden heart attack in his sleep at his home in Beverly Hills, California. He is buried in St. Peter's Cemetery, Lewiston, Maine, in the family plot.

== Partial filmography ==
| Year | Title | Role | Notes |
|---|---|---|---|
| 1914 | Harp of Tara | Jim Macy | Short subject |
| 1915 | The Tip-Off | Arthur Clarke | Short subject |
| 1915 | The Floating Death | Bruce Graham | Short subject |
| 1915 | His Mother's Portrait | Darrell Blackley | Short subject |
| 1915 | The Mating | 'Bullet Dick' Ames | Credited as Lewis J. Cody; Lost film |
| 1915 | The Promoter | Jim Howard | Short subject Credited as Lewis J. Cody |
| 1915 | Comrade John | Prophet Stein | Credited as Lewis J. Cody |
| 1915 | Should a Wife Forgive? | Alfred Bedford | |
| 1916 | The Buried Treasure of Cobre | Professor Peabody | Short subject Credited as Louis Cody |
| 1916 | The Crime of Circumstance | | Short subject |
| 1916 | The Grinning Skull | Donald Harvey | Short subject |
| 1916 | The Cycle of Fate | Sid Aldrich | Credited as Lewis Cody |
| 1916 | The Oath of Hate | | Short subject |
| 1917 | A Noble Fraud | | Short subject Credited as Lewis J. Cody |
| 1917 | The Bride's Silence | Paul Wagner | Credited as Lewis J. Cody |
| 1917 | Southern Pride | Robert Orme | Short subject |
| 1917 | A Game of Wits | Larry Caldwell | |
| 1917 | A Branded Soul | John Rannie | Lost film |
| 1918 | Painted Lips | Jim Douglass | |
| 1918 | Daddy's Girl | John Standlaw | |
| 1918 | Mickey | Reggie Drake | Credited as Lewis Cody; co-starring Mabel Normand |
| 1918 | For Husbands Only | Rolin Van D'Arcy | Lost film |
| 1918 | Treasure of the Sea | Jim Hardwick | |
| 1918 | The Bride's Awakening | Richard Earle | |
| 1918 | The Demon | Jim Lassells | Credited as Lewis Cody |
| 1918 | Playthings | John Hayward | |
| 1918 | Beans | Kirk | |
| 1918 | Borrowed Clothes | Stuart Furth | |
| 1919 | Don't Change Your Husband | Schuyler Van Sutphen | co-starring Gloria Swanson; directed by Cecil B. DeMille |
| 1919 | Are You Legally Married? | John Stark | Lost film |
| 1919 | Men, Women and Money | Cleveland Buchanan | |
| 1919 | Our Better Selves | Willard Standish | Lost film |
| 1919 | The Life Line | Philip Royston | co-starring Wallace Beery |
| 1919 | The Broken Butterfly | Daniel Thorn | |
| 1919 | The Beloved Cheater | Bruce Sands | Lost film |
| 1919 | As the Sun Went Down | Faro Bill | Lost film |
| 1920 | The Butterfly Man | Sedgewick Blynn | Lost film |
| 1920 | Occasionally Yours | Bruce Sands | |
| 1921 | The Sign on the Door | Frank Devereaux | |
| 1922 | The Valley of Silent Men | Cpl. James Kent | Incomplete film |
| 1922 | The Secrets of Paris | King Rudolph | Lost film |
| 1922 | Dangerous Pastime | Barry Adams | |
| 1923 | Rupert of Hentzau | Rupert of Hentzau | Sequel to The Prisoner of Zenda; Lost film |
| 1923 | Jacqueline | Raoul Radon | Lost film |
| 1923 | Souls for Sale | Owen Scudder | |
| 1923 | Within the Law | Joe Garson | |
| 1923 | Lawful Larceny | Guy Tarlow | Lost film |
| 1923 | Reno | Roy Tappan | |
| 1924 | The Shooting of Dan McGrew | Dangerous Dan McGrew | |
| 1924 | The Woman on the Jury | George Montgomery / George Wayne | Lost film |
| 1924 | Defying the Law | Pietro Savori | Lost film |
| 1924 | Nellie, the Beautiful Cloak Model | Walter Peck | |
| 1924 | Three Women | Edmund Lamont | |
| 1924 | Revelation | Count Adrian de Roche | |
| 1924 | Husbands and Lovers | Rex Phillips | |
| 1924 | So This is Marriage? | Daniel Rankin | |
| 1925 | Man and Maid | Sir Nicholas Thormonde | Lost film |
| 1925 | The Sporting Venus | Prince Carlos | Starring Blanche Sweet and Ronald Colman |
| 1925 | A Slave of Fashion | Nicholas Wentworth | co-starring Norma Shearer; Lost film |
| 1925 | The Tower of Lies | Victor Seastrom | co-starring Lon Chaney and Norma Shearer; Lost film |
| 1925 | Exchange of Wives | John Rathburn | |
| 1925 | His Secretary | David Colman | co-starring Norma Shearer; Lost film |
| 1926 | Monte Carlo | Tony Townsend | |
| 1926 | The Gay Deceiver | Toto/Antoine di Tillois | Lost film |
| 1927 | The Demi-Bride | Philippe Levaux | Lost film |
| 1927 | On Ze Boulevard | Gaston Pasqual | |
| 1927 | Adam and Evil | Adam Trevelyan / Allan Trevelyan | Lost film |
| 1927 | Tea for Three | Carter Langford | Lost film |
| 1928 | Wickedness Preferred | Anthony Dare | Lost film |
| 1928 | Beau Broadway | Jim Lambert | Lost film |
| 1928 | The Baby Cyclone | Joe Meadows | Lost film |
| 1928 | Show People | Himself | Uncredited |
| 1929 | A Single Man | Robin Worthington | Lost film |
| 1930 | What a Widow! | Victor | co-starring Gloria Swanson; Lost film |
| 1930 | Divorce Among Friends | Paul Wilcox | |
| 1931 | Dishonored | Colonel Kovrin | |
| 1931 | Not Exactly Gentlemen | Ace Beaudry | |
| 1931 | Three Girls Lost | William (Jack) Marriott | Starring John Wayne and Loretta Young |
| 1931 | Beyond Victory | Lew Cavanaugh | co-starring ZaSu Pitts |
| 1931 | Stout Hearts and Willing Hands | The Villain | Short subject |
| 1931 | Sweepstakes | Wally Weber | |
| 1931 | A Woman of Experience | Captain Otto von Lichstein | |
| 1931 | The Common Law | Dick Carmedon | co-starring Constance Bennett and Hedda Hopper |
| 1931 | Meet the Wife | Philip Lord | co-starring Laura La Plante |
| 1931 | Sporting Blood | Tip Scanlon | co-starring Clark Gable |
| 1931 | X Marks the Spot | George Howe | |
| 1932 | The Crusader | Jimmie Dale | |
| 1932 | File 113 | M. Gaston Le Coq | |
| 1932 | Beautiful and Dumb | | Short subject |
| 1932 | The Tenderfoot | Joe Lehman | |
| 1932 | 70,000 Witnesses | Slip Buchanan | |
| 1932 | The Crusader | Jimmie Dale | |
| 1932 | Madison Square Garden | Rourke | |
| 1932 | The Unwritten Law | Roger Morgan | |
| 1932 | A Parisian Romance | Baron | co-starring Gilbert Roland |
| 1932 | Under-Cover Man | Kenneth Mason | |
| 1933 | By Appointment Only | Dr. Michael Travers | |
| 1933 | Wine, Women and Song | Morgan Andrews | |
| 1933 | Sitting Pretty | Jules Clark | co-starring Ginger Rogers and Thelma Todd |
| 1933 | I Love That Man | Labels Castell | |
| 1934 | Private Scandal | Benjamin J. Somers | co-starring ZaSu Pitts |
| 1934 | Shoot the Works | Axel Hanratty | |
