= Southern Pride (film) =

1917 silent film by Henry King

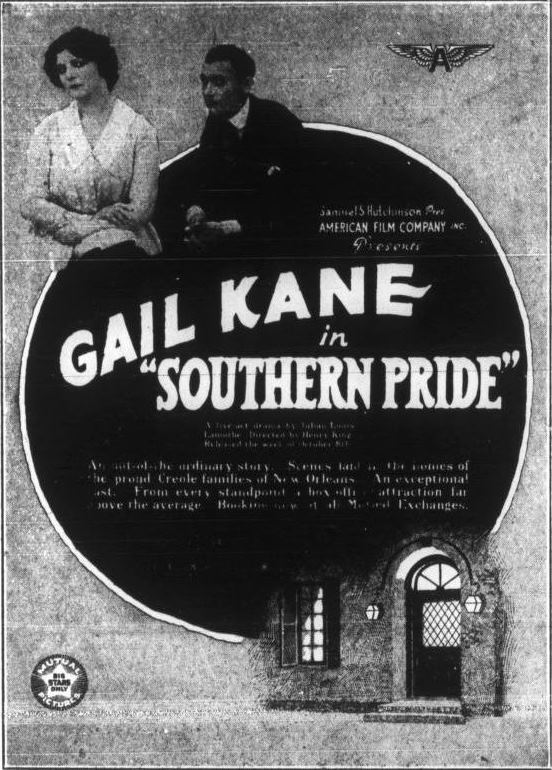
- Advertisement
- Directed by: Henry King
- Written by: Julian La Mothe
- Starring: Gail Kane; Lew Cody; Cora Drew
- Production company: American Film Company
- Distributed by: Mutual Film
- Release date: October 8, 1917
- Running time: 50 minutes
- Country: United States
- Language: Silent (English intertitles)

Southern Pride is a 1917 American silent drama film directed by Henry King and starring Gail Kane, Cora Drew, and John Vosper.

== Cast ==
- Gail Kane as Lucie De Montrand
- Cora Drew as Tante Jeanne
- John Vosper as Francois De Montand
- Robert Klein as Gasper La Roche
- Spottiswoode Aitken as Father Mort
- George Periolat as James Morgan
- Lew Cody as Robert Orme

== Bibliography ==
- Donald W. McCaffrey & Christopher P. Jacobs. Guide to the Silent Years of American Cinema. Greenwood Publishing, 1999. ISBN 0-313-30345-2
