= On Dangerous Ground (1917 film) =

- Directed by: Robert Thornby
- Written by: Frances Marion
- Based on: Little Comrade: A Tale of the Great War; 1915 novel by Burton E. Stevenson
- Produced by: William A. Brady
- Starring: Carlyle Blackwell; Gail Kane
- Cinematography: Lucien Andriot
- Production company: Peerless Productions
- Distributed by: World Film Company
- Release date: January 8, 1917
- Running time: 5 reels
- Country: United States
- Language: Silent (English intertitles)

On Dangerous Ground is a 1917 American silent drama film directed by Robert Thornby and starring Carlyle Blackwell and Gail Kane. It was distributed by the World Film Company.

== Plot ==
In the beginning of World War I before America was involved, Howard Thornton (Carlyle Blackwell) is a neutral American in Germany who watches his pal get drafted into the army. As he prepares to leave the county, he is surprised by a suitcase full of women's clothes appearing in his hotel room. It is soon followed by the woman herself, Louise (Gail Kane), a spy trying to get a vial of secret papers to French authorities. She persuades Blackwell pose as her husband and help her smuggle the cache out.

== Cast ==
- Carlyle Blackwell as Howard Barton
- Gail Kane as Louise
- Stanhope Wheatcroft as Hugo Grossman
- William Bailey as Ritter Boehm
- Frank Leigh as Trapadoux
- Florence Ashbrooke as Bertha
- John Burkell as Hans

== Status ==
The film exists in the Library of Congress collection. A DVD was released by Edward Lorusso with an original music score by Lorusso in March 2018.
