= Stout Hearts and Willing Hands =

1931 film

- Directed by: Bryan Foy
- Written by: Albert Austin; Walter Weems
- Starring: Frank Fay; Lew Cody
- Edited by: Charles Craft
- Production company: Masquers Club
- Distributed by: RKO Pathé Pictures
- Release date: June 15, 1931
- Running time: 20 minutes
- Country: United States
- Language: English

Stout Hearts and Willing Hands is a 1931 American Pre-Code short comedy film directed by Bryan Foy and starring Frank Fay and Lew Cody. At the 5th Academy Awards, held in 1932, it was nominated for an Academy Award for Best Short Subject (Comedy), but was disqualified. No reason was given for the disqualification.

== Cast ==
- Frank Fay
- Lew Cody
- Laura La Plante
- Alec B. Francis
- Mary Carr
- Tom Moore
- Owen Moore
- Matt Moore
- Maurice Black
- Georgie Harris
- Eddie Quillan
- Matthew Betz
- Ford Sterling
- Mack Swain
- Chester Conklin
- Clyde Cook
- Hank Mann
- James Finlayson
- Bobby Vernon
- Benny Rubin
- Bryant Washburn
- Richard Tucker
