= Whose Wife? =

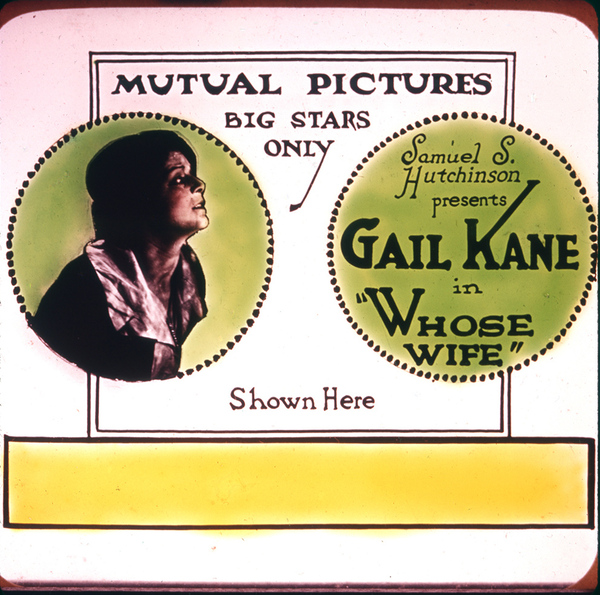
- Lantern slide for the film
- Directed by: Rollin S. Sturgeon
- Written by: Cecil Henry Bullivant
- Produced by: American Film Manufacturing Company
- Starring: Gail Kane
- Cinematography: John F. Seitz
- Distributed by: Mutual Film Corporation
- Release date: April 30, 1917
- Running time: 5 reels
- Country: USA
- Language: Silent..English

Whose Wife? is a lost 1917 silent film drama directed by Rollin S. Sturgeon and starring Gail Kane. It was produced by the American Film Company and distributed by Mutual Film.

== Cast ==
- Gail Kane - Mary Melville
- Elizabeth Taylor - Mrs. Melville (*not Elizabeth Taylor of MGM)
- Edward Peil Sr. - John Herrick
- Harry von Meter - Claude Varden
- Ethel Ullman - Nitra Ruiz
- Frank Rickert - Ramon Ruiz
- Lucille Young - Elsie Brandenham (*as Lucille Younge)
- Robert Klein - Tom Nelson
- Amelia Widen - Herrick's Aunt
