= Loggerheads (play) =

- Written by: Ralph Cullinan
- Original language: English
- Genre: Comedy
- Setting: Corny Halpin's house in County Clare, Ireland

Premiere
- Date premiered: February 9, 1925
- Place premiered: Cherry Lane Theatre; New York City, New York

Loggerheads was a 1925 Broadway three-act comedy written by Ralph Cullinan and produced by Barry Macollum and Whitford Kane with Macollum also playing Padna Collins and Kane playing Corny Halpin. It ran for 72 performances from February 9, 1925 to April 1925 at the Cherry Lane Theatre. Actress Gail Kane was not related to Whitford Kane.

Time Magazine—from a February 23, 1925 article—says this about the play: "An Irish sea-coast comedy, with a sob here and there, slipped quietly into the tiny Cherry Lane Theatre in Greenwich Village and was welcomed quietly. In the main, it was an honest play, possessed one excellent performance, and was interesting to the audience scarcely at all. The story told of a feud patched up by the fisherman's daughter who wanted to be a nun. Amid the rolling of exceedingly old country “r's,” she married her mother off to the son of the hated opposition. Joanna Roos (as the daughter) gave the performance."

== Cast ==
- Whitford Kane as Corny Halpin
- Gail Kane as Ellen Halpin
- Joanna Roos as Norah Halpin
- Barry Macollum as Padna Collins
- Earle House as Christie Barrett
