= The Eagle (1918 film) =

1918 film

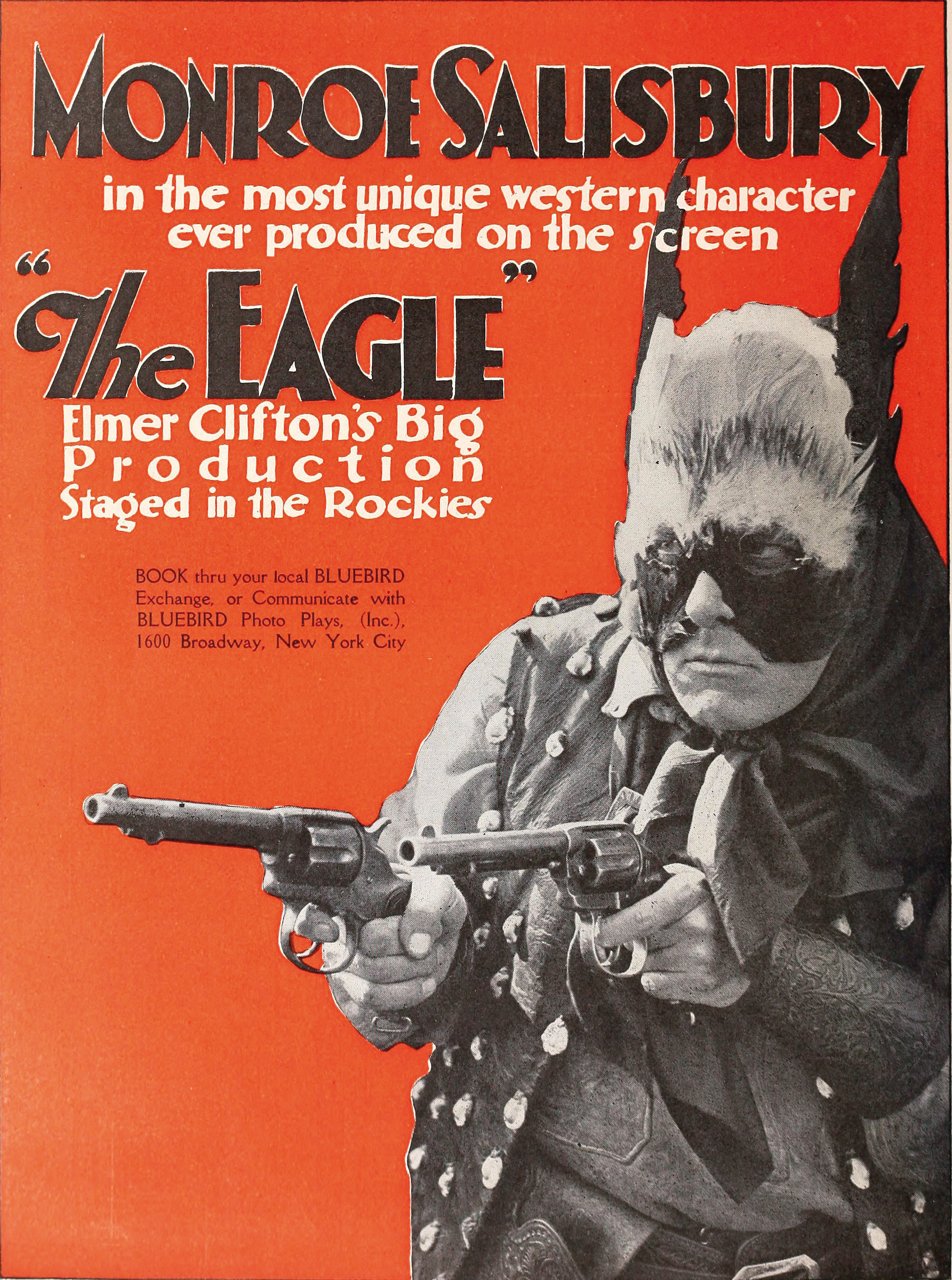
- Directed by: Elmer Clifton
- Written by: Ethel Hill; Eugene B. Lewis; Henry Christeen Warnack
- Starring: Monroe Salisbury; Edna Earle; Ward Wing
- Cinematography: Virgil Miller
- Production company: Universal Pictures
- Distributed by: Universal Pictures
- Release date: June 22, 1918
- Running time: 50 minutes
- Country: United States
- Languages: Silent; English intertitles

The Eagle is a 1918 American silent Western film directed by Elmer Clifton and starring Monroe Salisbury, Edna Earle and Ward Wing.

== Cast ==
- Monroe Salisbury as John Gregory ('The Eagle')
- Edna Earle as Lucy
- Ward Wing as Bob
- Alfred Allen as Mining company official

== Preservation ==
With no holdings located in archives, The Eagle is considered a lost film.

== Bibliography ==
- James Robert Parish & Michael R. Pitts. Film directors: a guide to their American films. Scarecrow Press, 1974.
