= Henry Christeen Warnack =

American journalist

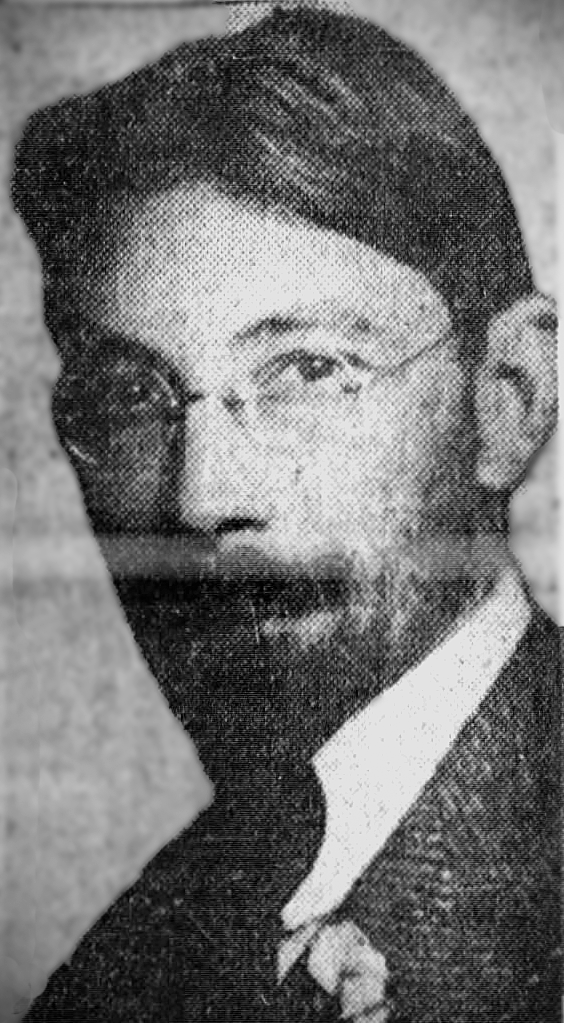
- Image Los Angeles Times
- Born: October 1, 1877; Campbell, Tennessee
- Died: November 2, 1927 (aged 50); Los Angeles, California
- Other names: Henry C Warnack; Henry Christian Warnack
- Occupations: Author; Essayist; Movie stories and Scenario; Poet
- Known for: Life's New Psalm; The Honor System

Henry Christeen Warnack (1877 – 1927) was a film and theater critic in the United States. He released novels and works of poetry. He crafted essays on a range of topics. Besides being a talented speaker, he got involved in the early film industry, scripting stories and Scenarios for various silent films.

== Early years ==
Warnack was born in Campbell Tennessee, on October 1, 1877. He attended the Military Academy - Tennessee Military Institute. After graduation, he taught school in Maryville, Tennessee. Later, he moved to Knoxville, Tennessee. He started his newspaper career as a cub reporter for The Knoxville Journal and Tribune and the Knoxville News Sentinel. Because of health concerns, he moved to Colorado becoming a reporter for Colorado Springs Gazette and the Rocky Mountain News in Denver.

== Career ==
Warnack moved to Los Angeles in 1907 when he was 29 years of age. He worked for the Los Angeles Times as a drama critic and became the dramatic department editor. He also wrote stories for Fox movies. Warnack lauded the works of John Steven McGroarty.

He wrote articles for many trade journals and magazines, including:

- Out West.
- West Coast Magazine.
- Photoplay Magazine.

He also wrote "The Story of the Union Printers' Home," an essay for the 52nd convention of the International Typographical Union's pamphlet. A writeup in Motography described his story for The Conqueror as virile and engrossing. He reviewed Eloise Bibb Thompson's first screenplay, "A Reply to the Clansman," which responded to Thomas Dixon Jr.'s novel The Clansman: A Historical Romance of the Ku Klux Klan.

According to Warnack, two of his greatest achievements were:

- The publication of the book–"Life's New Psalm" in 1922 (Note: The final copyright listing for "Life's New Psalm" was entered into the record as shown: Warnack, (Henry Christian)* Alham- bra, Calif. Life's new psalm. Los Angeles, Calif., New era press, 1922 2 p. 1., p. 16mo. (7811 © Feb 23, 1922; 2 c and aff. Mar 13, 1922 A 659091.)
- The Honor System was a 1917 silent film about prison reforms in Arizona and directed by Raoul Walsh. Warnack's involvement in the film varies depending on the account. Some articles claim it was based on a Warnack novel, others a story he sold to Fox. Controversies aside, he was proud of his involvement.

== Death ==
The front page November 3, 1927 article in the Los Angeles Times reads:

Henry, Christine Warnock, nationally known newspaper, man, and formally editor of the dramatic department of the times, died yesterday morning at the family residence, 328 North Marengo St., Alhambra, following in illness of three days. Pneumonia was assigned as a cause of death.

== Filmography ==
- Fires of Conscience, directed by Oscar C. Apfel
- The Honor System, directed by Raoul Walsh
- The Morals of Hilda, directed by Lloyd B. Carleton
- The Conqueror (1917), directed by Raoul Walsh
- The Eagle (1918), directed by Elmer Clifton
- Are You Legally Married? (1919)
