= Lacoste Babies Home fire =

1945 building fire in Maine, United States

- Date: January 31, 1945 (81 years ago)
- Time: Around 5:30 AM
- Location: Lacoste Babies Home 195 South Main Street Auburn, Maine, U.S.; 44.0786°N 70.2247°W
- Deaths: 17
- Injuries: 2
- Charges: None

The Lacoste Babies Home fire took place on January 31, 1945, in Auburn, Maine, at a privately owned boarding house that cared for the children of wartime factory workers. The fire killed 16 children and one adult. Three adults and five children survived.

== Background ==
The Lacoste Babies Home was located in a one-and-a-half story former farmhouse at 195 South Main Street in Auburn, Maine. It was constructed in 1900 by Mr. and Mrs. James Cross after their previous home was destroyed by a fire. The ground floor had a large front room divided into two sections. Four children slept in each section. There were accommodations for another eight in a room next to the kitchen. The first floor also contained a parlor, bathroom, kitchen, and a small storage room. Upstairs, there were four bedrooms. One was used by owner Eva Lacoste and her sons. Two were used by employees (Rosa Cote and her five-year-old son slept in one and Loretta Fournier slept in the other). Three babies, including Fournier's, slept in the fourth bedroom.

Olivette Royer, a registered nurse, opened a nursery in the home in 1930. According to city health officer Shirley J. Davis, there were as many as 26 children in the home at one time. In 1940, the state bureau of social welfare ordered Royer to decrease the number of children in the home to less than twelve. Royer did not believe she could meet operating expenses with this amount of children and closed the home.

On May 10, 1944, Eva Lacoste applied to the city of Auburn to operate the home. She was granted permission to operate a boarding house. Davis inspected the home on multiple occasions and always found it in a sanitary condition.

Lacoste also applied to the Maine department of health and welfare for a permit to operate a lodging house. She received a license from the department's health division, but did not receive one from its social welfare bureau. According to state health and welfare commissioner Harry O. Page, Lacoste was informed that if she reduced the number of children she was caring for from 22 to 16, she would be granted the license. The department did not take action against Lacoste because she was cooperating with them and the children appeared to be well cared for. Lacoste claimed that she had never been told she needed a second license.

On January 30, 1944, the department sent a letter to Lacoste requesting that she acquire a certificate from the local fire chief declaring that there were no fire hazards in the home. Page did not believe there were any fire hazards, as the home had "rear and front exits, a number of windows, [and the] children were all quartered on the ground floor and could have been easily removed”, but the department still wanted a certificate from the fire chief because the department was "not trained to look into such matters". Prior to this, Lacoste had never had the home inspected for fire hazards and had never been asked to do so. According to Auburn fire chief Ralph B. Harnden, the fire department confined its inspections to commercial, retail, and apartment properties and would not inspect a baby home unless requested. Lacoste did not receive the letter until two days after the fire.

== Fire ==
Around 5:20 am, Blanche Tanguay, a practical nurse and sister of Lacoste, woke up to take care of Diane Savard, a four-month-old who had a cold. Tanguay got a bottle of milk and brought it to the kitchen to heat it. When she got there she found “the ceiling was on fire. Flames were coming down the walls." She awoke the other women in the house and attempted to telephone for help, but was blocked by the flames.

Lacoste was awoken around 5:30 am, either by the sound of an explosion or by Tanguay's screams. She attempted to move four cribs out of the nursery, but passed out. Tanguay ran back into the home and carried Lacoste out. Tanguay then trudged through knee-deep snow to the neighboring home of Mr. and Mrs. Guy Stewart. Mrs. Stewart was woken up by Tanguay pounding on their door and saw the fire from an upstairs window. She woke her husband, who was a lieutenant in the Auburn fire department, and phoned the fire station. Guy Stewart quickly dressed and went to the Lacoste home, but could not enter due to the intense heat.

Once awake, Fournier ran into the front room and grabbed her daughter and another child. She attempted to get a third baby, but couldn't manage to hold him. She was able to get the two children out, but the fire prevented her from going back for any more.

Laurent Lacoste, Eva Lacoste's fourteen-year-old son, helped get his youngest brother, Norman, out of the building. The middle child, Guy, was able to escape unaided.

Rosa Cote was awoken by Tanguay, but decided to return to her room and get dressed. She and her five-year-old son, Robert, died in the fire.

At 5:43 am, the Auburn fire department received a call from the Stewart home. Once they arrived, they found the entire home engulfed in flames and were unable to enter for several minutes. One firefighter, Ardelle (Al) Littlefield, was injured when a jagged piece of glass from a broken window cut his foot to the bone. After he received treatment from a doctor, Littlefield immediately returned to the fire.

In total, 16 children as well as one adult (Cote) perished in the fire. As a rule, the Lacoste Babies Home did not care for children over the age of three. Aside from the Cotes, the victims ranged in age from three years to three months old. The bodies were brought to the Dillingham Funeral Home and the adjoining central fire station, where they were identified by relatives. According to medical examiner Dr. R. N. Randall, the majority of children died of suffocation, but three were burnt almost beyond recognition. No autopsies were performed because the cause of death was obvious.

== Cause ==
Auburn fire chief Ralph B. Harnden believed that the fire had been caused by gas ignited in pipes from the hot air furnace.

== Investigation ==
Androscoggin county attorney A. F. Martin and state insurance department investigator Joseph A. P. Flynn held a series of hearings in the Auburn city council chambers. Martin presented his findings to a grand jury the following month. On March 15, 1945, the grand jury returned no indictments in connection with the fire. Martin brought the evidence before another grand jury and on June 7, 1945, Martin announced that this jury had returned no bill.

The evidence from the Martin–Flynn hearings was released on the order of governor Horace Hildreth. It showed that the child welfare bureau had been lax when it came to licensing the Lacoste Baby Home. The home had been licensed in 1939, but hadn't been licensed since. The bureau was aware that the home was in operation and not in compliance from 1940 to 1945, but took no action. Furthermore, the home went an entire year (1944) without an inspection.

== Aftermath ==
Eleven of the victims were buried in St. Peter's Cemetery in Lewiston, Maine. Their graves were unmarked until 2014, when Auburn's Cub Scout Pack 111 raised money for gravestones.

Following the fire, the Maine Legislature made a fire inspection a requirement for a baby home license. It also required follow up inspections to ensure compliance.

Lacoste sold the property where the fire took place to John Mason in March 1946. She remained in the Lewiston–Auburn area and remarried in 1966. She died in 1983.

== See also ==
- List of disasters in Maine by death toll
