= The Honor System (film) =

1917 film directed by Raoul Walsh

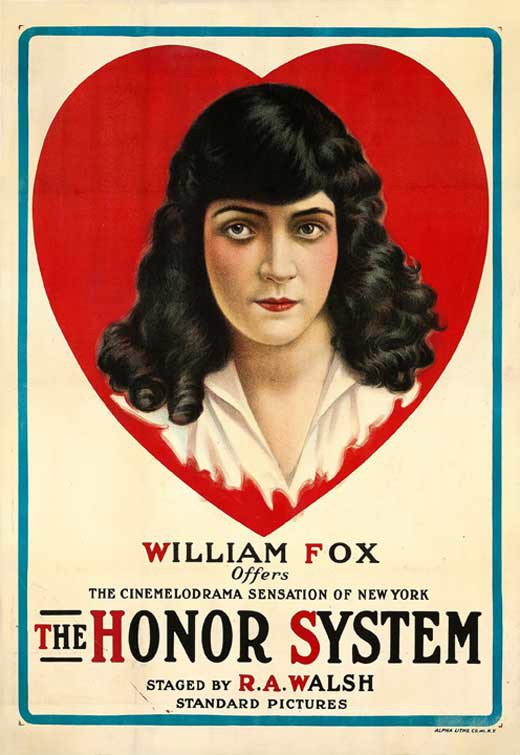
- Directed by: Raoul Walsh (ass't director:J. Gordon Cooper)
- Screenplay by: Raoul Walsh (scenario); Hettie Gray Baker (titles)
- Based on: The Honor System by Henry Christeen Warnack
- Produced by: William Fox
- Starring: Milton Sills; Miriam Cooper
- Cinematography: Georges Benoit; Len Powers; George Richter
- Distributed by: Fox Film Corporation
- Release date: February 12, 1917
- Running time: 10 reels
- Country: United States
- Language: Silent (English intertitles)

The Honor System is a 1917 American silent crime drama film directed by Raoul Walsh and starring Milton Sills and Cora Drew. The film established Walsh as a director. It was based on a novel of the same name by Henry Christeen Warnack.

== Cast ==
- Milton Sills as Joseph Stanton
- Cora Drew as His Mother
- James A. Marcus as Governor John Hunter
- Arthur Mackley as Steven Holt
- Miriam Cooper as Edith
- George Walsh as Jack Taylor
- Charles Clary as Crales Harrington
- Gladys Brockwell as Trixie Bennett
- Roy Rice as Three-Fingered Louis
- Pomeroy Cannon as James Phelan
- Johnny Reese as Mugsey

== Preservation ==
With no prints of The Honor System located in any film archives, it is considered a lost film. In February 2021, the film was cited by the National Film Preservation Board on their Lost U.S. Silent Feature Films.

== See also ==
- Prison film
- 1937 Fox vault fire
