= When Men Betray (1918 film) =

- Directed by: Ivan Abramson; William Abramson
- Written by: Ivan Abramson
- Produced by: Graphic Film Corp.
- Starring: Gail Kane; Sally Crute
- Cinematography: Marcel Le Picard
- Distributed by: State Rights
- Release date: June 1918
- Running time: 60 minutes
- Country: USA
- Language: Silent...English titles

When Men Betray is a lost 1918 American silent drama film directed by Ivan Abramson and starring Gail Kane. It was released on a State Rights basis.

== Plot ==
Despite urging of wife Marion and young daughter Vivian, Raymond Edwards intensifies his affair with charming adventuress Lucille Stanton. Marion attends a reception with Frederick Barton one evening, leaving Raymond free to visit Lucille and leaving Raymond's younger sister Alice alone in the house. Bob Gardner, who is engaged to Raymond's elder sister Florence, rapes Alice, and that same evening, Raymond finds Frederick in Lucille's room. Realizing the great pain he has caused his wife, Raymond asks for Marion's forgiveness. Bob is killed in a fight with Frederick, whereupon his brother, Dick Gardner, offers to marry Alice to atone for Bob's wrong.

== Cast ==
- Gail Kane as Marion Edwards
- Robert Elliott as Raymond Edwards
- Sally Crute as Lucille Stanton
- Gertrude Braun as Florence Stanton
- Juliette Moore as Vivian Edwards
- Jack McLean as Bob Gardner
- Reid Hamilton as Dick Garden
- Dora Mills Adams as Mrs. Gardner
- Stuart Holmes as Frederick Burton
- Tallulah Bankhead (uncredited) as Alice Edwards
- Lillian Berse
- Hazel Washburn

== Preservation ==
With no holdings located in archives, When Men Betray is considered a lost film.
