= The Crusader (1932 film) =

1932 film

- Film poster
- Directed by: Frank R. Strayer
- Written by: Wilson Collison (play); Edward T. Lowe Jr. (screenplay)
- Produced by: Phil Goldstone; Larry Darmour
- Starring: Evelyn Brent
- Edited by: Otis Garrett
- Distributed by: Majestic Pictures; Capitol Film Exchange (State's Rights)
- Release date: October 5, 1932
- Running time: 65 minutes
- Country: United States
- Language: English

The full film

The Crusader is a 1932 American pre-Code drama film based upon the play of the same name by Wilson Collison, directed by Frank R. Strayer, and starring Evelyn Brent.

== Plot ==
A pushy newspaper reporter Eddie Crane (Ned Sparks) schemes to get rid of crusading District Attorney Phillip Brandon (H. B. Warner). Complicating matters is the sordid past of Brandon's wife Tess (Evelyn Brent) as well as his sister Marcia's affair with a gangster.

== Cast ==
- Evelyn Brent as Tess Brandon
- H. B. Warner as Phillip Brandon
- Lew Cody as Jimmie Dale
- Ned Sparks as Eddie Crane
- Walter Byron as Joe Carson
- Marceline Day as Marcia Brandon
- John St. Polis as Robert Henley
- Arthur Hoyt as Oscar Shane
- Joseph W. Girard as Corrigan
- Syd Saylor as Harry Smaltz
- Lloyd Ingraham as Alton
