= The Prince of Avenue A =

1920 film directed by John Ford

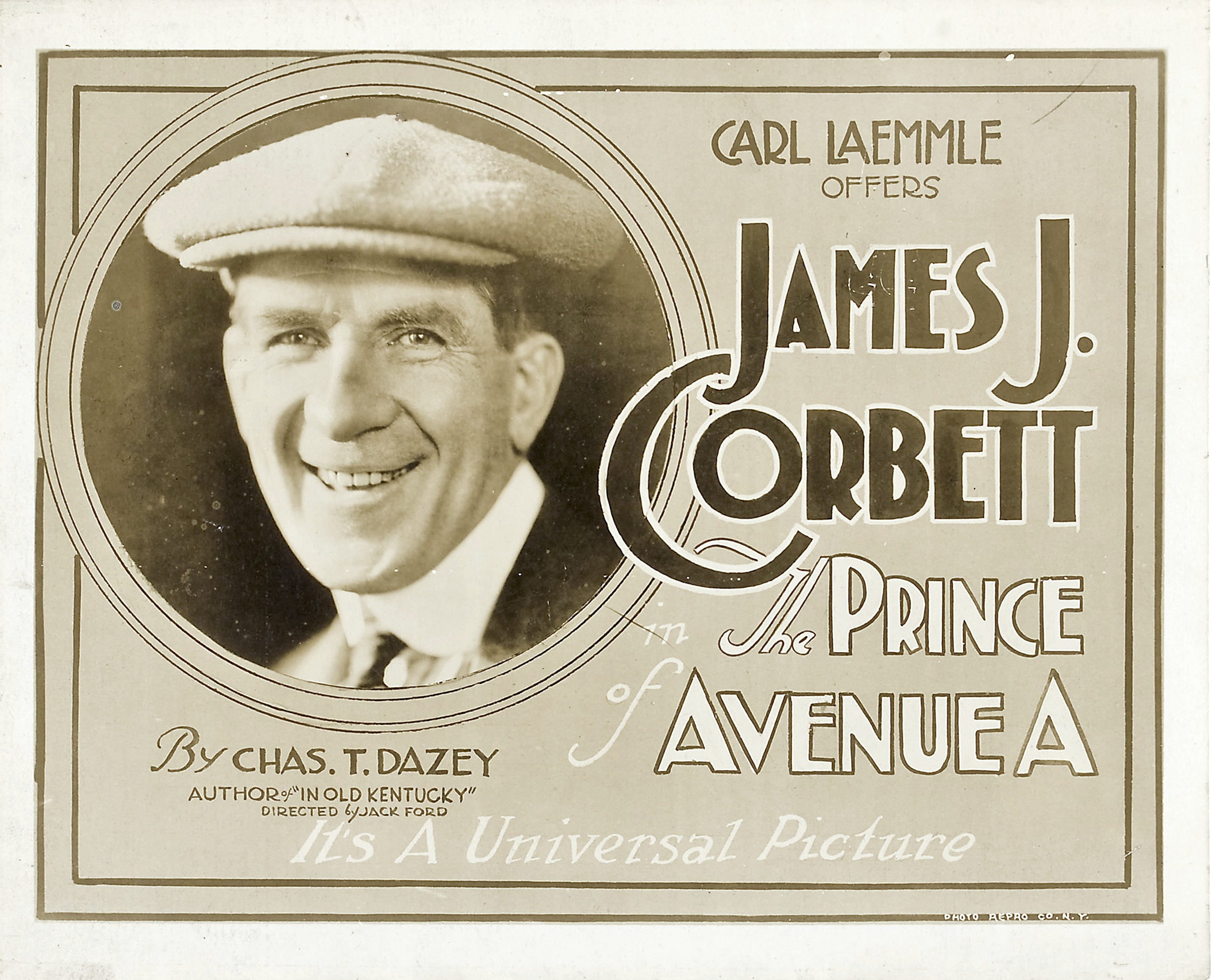
- Contemporary lobby card
- Directed by: John Ford
- Written by: Charles Dazey; Frank Mitchell Dazey; Charles J. Wilson
- Produced by: Carl Laemmle
- Starring: James J. Corbett
- Cinematography: John W. Brown
- Distributed by: Universal Film Manufacturing Company
- Release date: January 11, 1920
- Running time: 50 minutes
- Country: United States
- Language: Silent (English intertitles)

The Prince of Avenue A is a 1920 American drama film directed by John Ford. The film is considered to be lost.

== Plot ==
As described in a film magazine, Barry O'Connor, son of Patrick O'Connor, plumber and political power, is called to the residence of William Tompkins, Tammany man, whom he is to "put over" in the coming election. Here Barry meets Mary Tompkins, and mutual admiration results in an invitation to a social affair at the Tompkins home. At the affair Barry's crude ways bring forth criticism and he leaves, offended. His father threatens to withdraw his support of the candidate but later changes his mind. The rupture is later healed when Mary and her father attend a ward ball and Mary leads the grand march with Barry. This begins the romance that culminates in the marriage of Barry and Mary.

== Cast ==
- James J. Corbett as Barry O'Connor
- Richard Cummings as Patrick O'Connor
- Cora Drew as Mary O'Connor
- Frederick Vroom as William Tompkins
- Mary Warren as Mary Tompkins
- George Fisher as Regie Vanderlip
- Harry Northrup as Edgar Jones
- Mark Fenton as Father O'Toole
- John Cook as Butler (credited as Johnnie Cooke)
- Lydia Yeamans Titus as Housekeeper

== See also ==
- List of lost films
