= The Serpent's Tooth (film) =

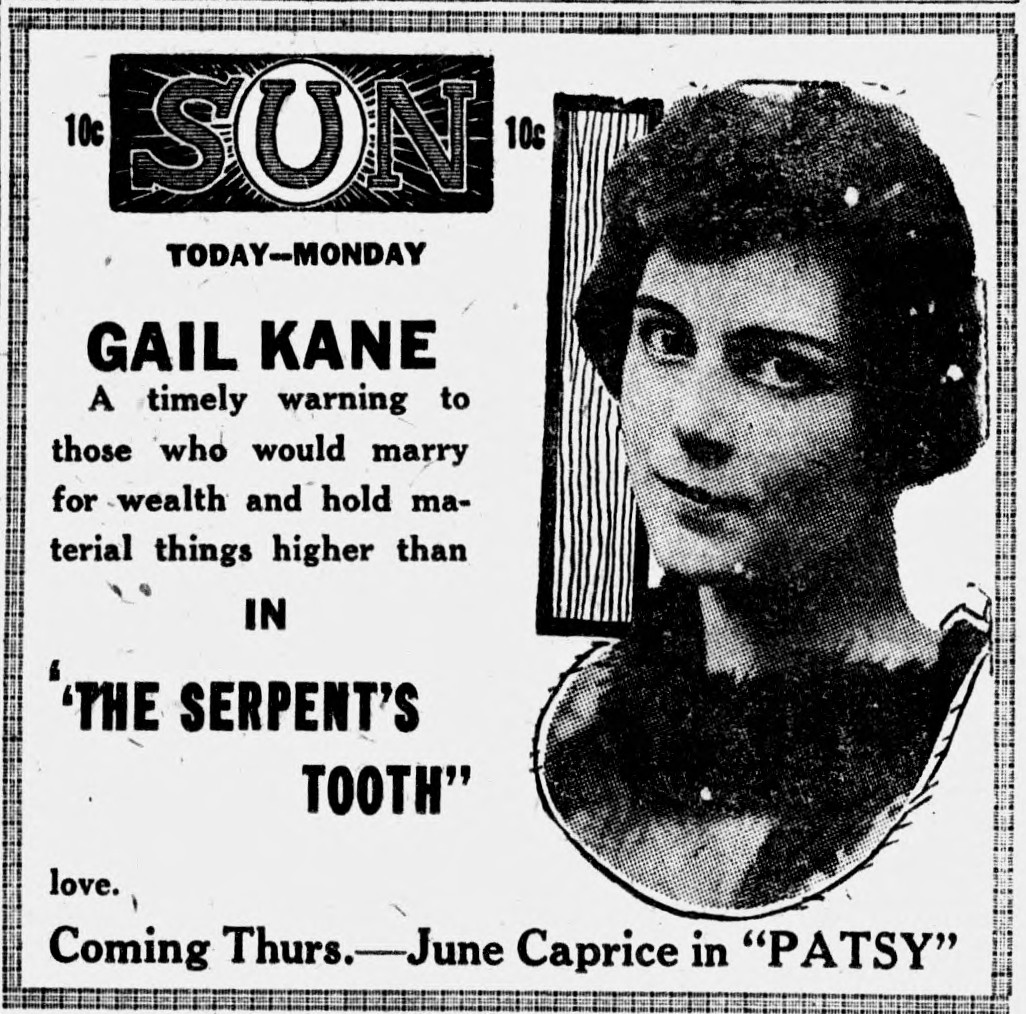
- Newspaper advertisement
- Directed by: Rollin S. Sturgeon
- Written by: Forrest Halsey (story); Doris Schroeder (scenario)
- Starring: Gail Kane
- Cinematography: John Seitz
- Production company: American Film Company
- Distributed by: Mutual Film
- Release date: May 28, 1917
- Running time: 5 reels
- Country: United States
- Language: Silent (English intertitles)

The Serpent's Tooth is a 1917 American silent drama film starring Gail Kane from the stage and released through the Mutual Film company. It is a lost film.

== Cast ==
- Gail Kane as Faith Channing
- William Conklin as James Winthrop
- Edward Peil Sr. as Jack Stilling
- Jane Pascal as Hortense Filliard
- Frederick Vroom as Matthew Addison-Brown
- Mary Wise as Mrs. Addison-Brown (Mary Lee Wise)
- Charles P. Kellogg as Carrington
- Gayne Whitman as Sid Lennox (* as Al Vosburgh)

== Reception ==
Like many American films of the time, The Serpent's Tooth was subject to cuts by city and state film censorship boards. The Chicago Board of Censors, because of the plot involving drug use, gave the film an "adults only" permit and required cuts in Reel 1 of the first view of a woman in a low cut gown and two closer views of the same; in Reel 3 of the intertitle "You make her use it. Its grounds for divorce in this state." and the shot of man putting drug into the woman's medicine; in Reel 4 of the intertitle "You say you couldn't get any more. I have been more successful."; and in Reel 5 of the intertitles "Your damned lover is a liar." and "It's the drug that loves you - the drug I've fed her night and day," and the scene of the choking of the wife and knocking her down.
