= A Game of Wits =

1917 silent film by Henry King

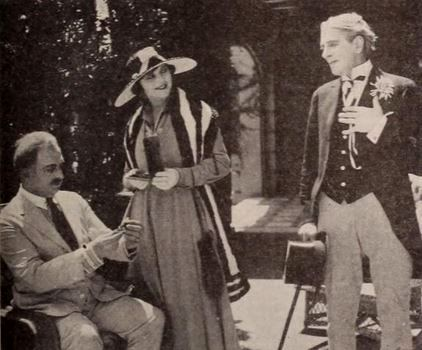
- Directed by: Henry King
- Written by: Daniel F. Whitcomb
- Starring: Gail Kane; Lew Cody; George Periolat
- Cinematography: John F. Seitz
- Production company: American Film Company
- Distributed by: Mutual Film
- Release date: November 5, 1917
- Running time: 50 minutes
- Country: United States
- Language: Silent (English intertitles)

A Game of Wits is a 1917 American silent comedy-drama film directed by Henry King and starring Gail Kane, George Periolat, and Spottiswoode Aitken.

== Cast ==
- Gail Kane as Jeannette Browning
- George Periolat as Cyrus Browning
- Spottiswoode Aitken as Silas Stone
- Lew Cody as Larry Caldwell

== Bibliography ==
- Donald W. McCaffrey & Christopher P. Jacobs. Guide to the Silent Years of American Cinema. Greenwood Publishing, 1999. ISBN 0-313-30345-2
