= Are You Legally Married? =

1919 film

- Directed by: Robert Thornby
- Produced by: Miles Dobson; Henry Christeen Warnack
- Starring: Lew Cody; Rosemary Theby; Roy Laidlaw
- Cinematography: Sol Polito
- Production company: Success Pictures Company
- Distributed by: Elk Photoplays
- Release date: October 5, 1919
- Running time: 50 minutes
- Country: United States
- Languages: Silent; English intertitles

Are You Legally Married? is a 1919 American silent drama film directed by Robert Thornby and starring Lew Cody, Rosemary Theby and Roy Laidlaw. The film premiered in October of 1919 and was produced by Success Pictures Company.

The story explores marital themes and divorce. Promotional material for the film included the tagline, "Are your children legitimate?"

== Plot ==
June Redding, a ranch owner, marries lawyer John Stark, but his dishonesty and reckless habits drive her to divorce him in Reno after New York law prevents it. She remarries Wayne Hearne, a man of integrity, and they have a child together. When Stark discovers her Reno divorce is not legally valid, he blackmails her for bigamy, leading to a court case he wins. In a final confrontation, Stark is accidentally killed, freeing June and Wayne to continue their family life in peace.

== Cast ==
- Lew Cody as John Stark
- Rosemary Theby as June Redding
- Nanon Welsh as Sue Redding
- Henry Woodward as Wayne Hearne
- H.J. Barrows as J.J. Redding
- Roy Laidlaw as Henry Martin

== Court Case ==
In 1919, writer Miles Dobson filed for damages against Robert Thornby and two producing companies arguing that the story was stolen from the writer.
