= Souls in Pawn (1917 film) =

1917 film by Henry King

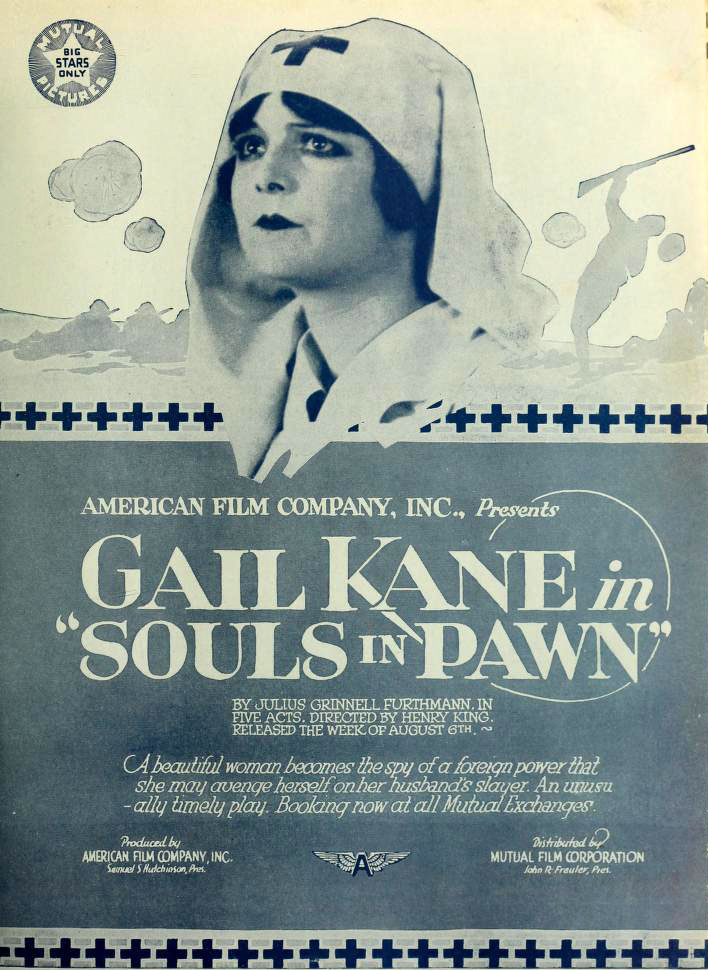
- Advertisement
- Directed by: Henry King
- Written by: Jules Furthman (story)
- Starring: Gail Kane
- Cinematography: John Seitz
- Production company: American Film Company
- Distributed by: Mutual Film
- Release date: August 6, 1917
- Running time: 5 reels
- Country: United States
- Language: Silent (English intertitles)

Souls in Pawn is a 1917 American silent spy-drama film directed by Henry King and starring Gail Kane. Based on a story by Jules Furthman, it was released by Mutual Film.

== Plot ==
As described in a film magazine review, Sebastian Dore (Dearholt) is mysteriously murdered in front of his home, and his beautiful wife Liane (Kane) vows revenge on the murderer. To this end she becomes a German spy for Karl, Prince von Kondermarck (MacLean), but the two fall in love. At the outbreak of war Karl is called to Germany, and Liane opens her home to wounded French soldiers. She accidentally learns that Karl is the murderer of her husband and plans to turn him over to the police. Before he leaves, Karl produces letters showing that Sebastian had betrayed his sister, and explains that Sebastian was accidentally shot in a struggle. Liane and Karl escape together on his yacht.

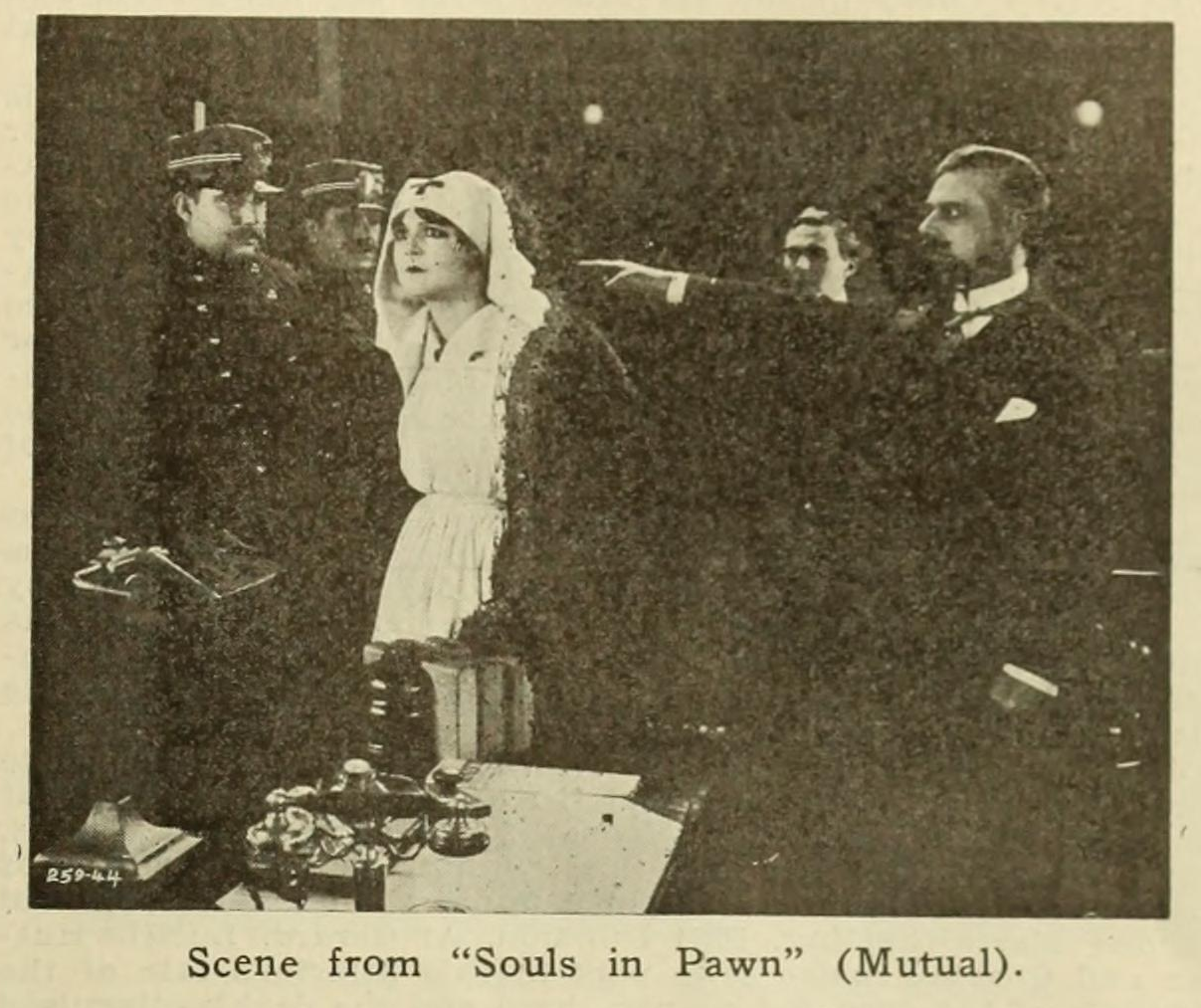
Gail Kane in a scene from Souls in Pawn

== Cast ==
- Gail Kane - Liane Dore
- Douglas MacLean - Karl, Prince von Kondermarck
- Robert Klein - Baron Arnold von Pllnitz/The Comte
- Frank Rickert - De Courcey
- Edward Peil, Sr. - Etienne Jaccard
- Ashton Dearholt - Sebastian Dore
- Ruth Everdale - Marie, Liane's Child

== Production ==
King later said the film was based on a book The Woman in Black. He added:

The War was on by now and this story was about a German count and a woman involved in espionage. It was very sympathetic to the Germans, having been written long before they ever thought of a war. Immediately, the government just swooped down on us. They picked Jules up and put him in the army and sent him to a training camp in Texas and they interviewed me.

== Reception ==
Moving Picture World's review was very positive, saying of the film "'Souls in Pawn' is one of the strongest photodramas produced in the United States since the beginning of the war."
