= The Crowd Roars =

The Crowd Roars may refer to:

- The Crowd Roars (1932 film), directed by Howard Hawks and starring James Cagney
- The Crowd Roars (1938 film), featuring Robert Taylor
