= Go Straight (1921 film) =

1921 film

- Directed by: William Worthington
- Written by: William Harper Dean (story); George Hively
- Starring: Frank Mayo; Cora Drew; Lillian Rich
- Cinematography: Leland Lancaster
- Production company: Universal Pictures
- Distributed by: Universal Pictures
- Release date: October 17, 1921
- Running time: 50 minutes
- Country: United States
- Languages: Silent; English intertitles

Go Straight is a 1921 American silent drama film directed by William Worthington and starring Frank Mayo, Cora Drew and Lillian Rich.

== Cast ==
- Frank Mayo as Reverend Keith Rollins
- Cora Drew as Mrs. Conners
- Harry Carter as Hellfire Gibbs
- Lillian Rich as Hope Gibbs
- George F. Marion as Jim Boyd
- Lassie Young as Laura Boyd
- Charles Brinley as Buck Stevens

== Bibliography ==
- Connelly, Robert B. The Silents: Silent Feature Films, 1910-36, Volume 40, Issue 2. December Press, 1998.
- Munden, Kenneth White. The American Film Institute Catalog of Motion Pictures Produced in the United States, Part 1. University of California Press, 1997.
