= Who Loved Him Best? =

- Directed by: Dell Henderson
- Produced by: Mutual Film
- Starring: Edna Goodrich; Tallulah Bankhead
- Cinematography: Sol Polito
- Distributed by: Mutual Film
- Release date: February 4, 1918
- Running time: About 50 minutes
- Country: United States
- Language: Silent (English intertitles)

Who Loved Him Best? is a 1918 American 5-reel silent drama film directed by Dell Henderson and starring Edna Goodrich. It was produced and distributed by the Mutual Film Company, and was one of the last films it produced before it ceased operations in 1918. Actress Tallulah Bankhead has an early role in the feature.

== Cast ==
- Edna Goodrich as Doria Dane
- Herbert Evans as George Steele
- Miriam Folger as Mrs. Schuyler
- Frank Otto as Harry North
- Charles Martin as Gilbert Jasper
- A. H. Busby as C. M. Winton
- Nadia Gary as Amy Winton
- Francois Du Barry as Assistant director
- Tallulah Bankhead as Nell

== Preservation ==
Who Loved Him Best? is preserved in the Library of Congress collection.
