= Her Second Husband =

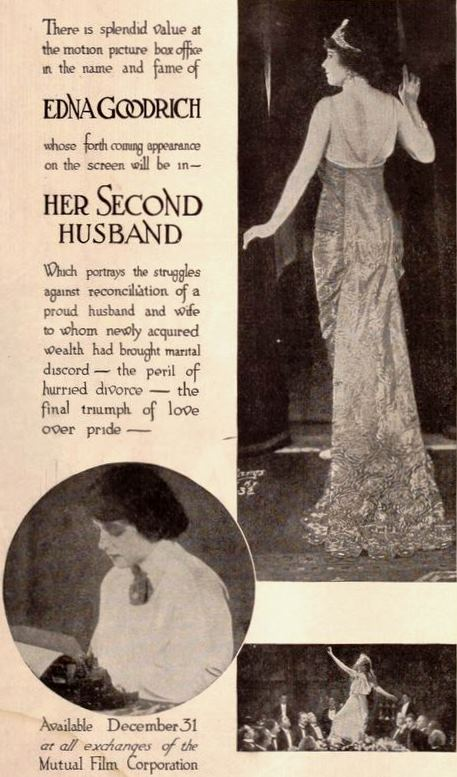
- Advertisement
- Directed by: Dell Henderson
- Written by: Hamilton Smith
- Produced by: Mutual Film
- Starring: Edna Goodrich
- Cinematography: Sol Polito
- Distributed by: Mutual Film
- Release date: December 31, 1917
- Running time: 50 minutes (5-reel)
- Country: United States
- Language: Silent (English intertitles)

Her Second Husband is a 1917 American 5-reel silent drama film directed by Dell Henderson and starring stage actress Edna Goodrich. It was produced and released by Mutual Film.

== Cast ==
- Edna Goodrich as Helen Kirby
- William B. Davidson as John Kirby
- Richard Neill as Richard Stone (credited as Richard R. Neill)
- Miriam Folger as Celeste Valdane

== Preservation ==
With no prints of Her Second Husband located in any film archives, it is a lost film.
