= Queen X =

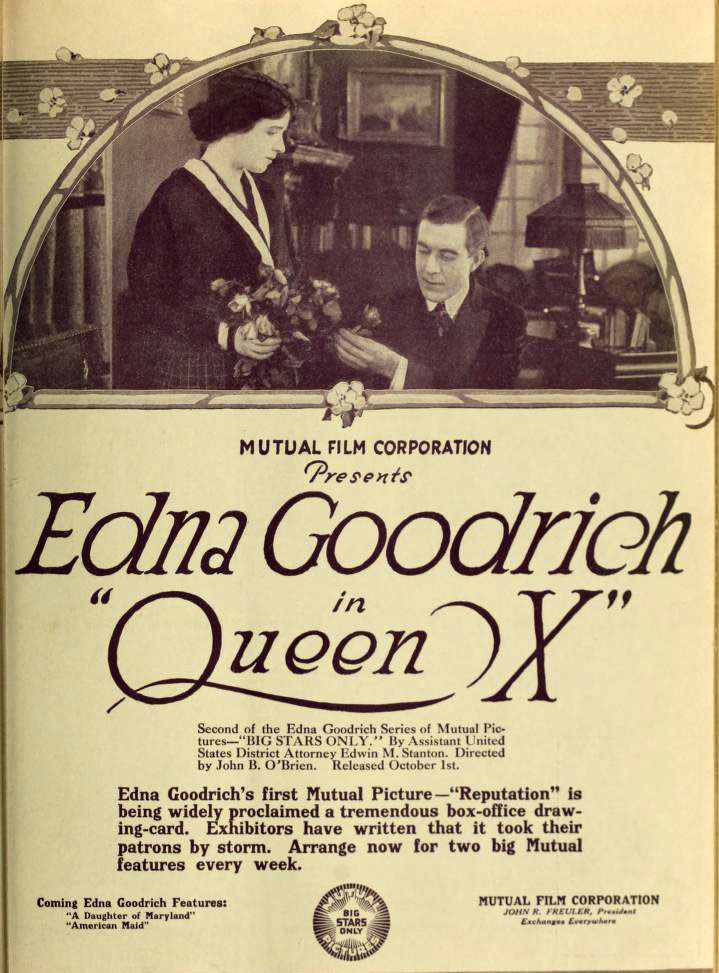
- Directed by: John B. O'Brien
- Written by: Edwin M. Stanton
- Produced by: Mutual Film
- Starring: Edna Goodrich
- Cinematography: Sol Polito
- Distributed by: Mutual Film
- Release date: October 1, 1917
- Running time: 5 reels
- Country: United States
- Language: Silent (English intertitles)

Queen X is a 1917 American silent crime-drama film directed by John B. O'Brien and produced and released through the Mutual Film Company. Stage personality Edna Goodrich, a former wife of Nat C. Goodwin, is the star.

The film survives in the Library of Congress collection.

== Cast ==
- Edna Goodrich - Janice Waltham, Queen X
- Hugh Thompson - George Evans
- Lucille Taft - Miriam Evans
- Dora Mills Adams - Mrs. Evans
- William Wolcott - Arnold Somers
- Jack Hopkins - Nippo
- P. Tamato - Togo

== Reception ==
Like many American films of the time, Queen X was subject to cuts by city and state film censorship boards. The Chicago Board of Censors required a cut of two opium den scenes, the preparing of an opium pipe, and two scenes of a party slumming in the opium den.
