= William B. Davidson =

American actor (1888–1947)

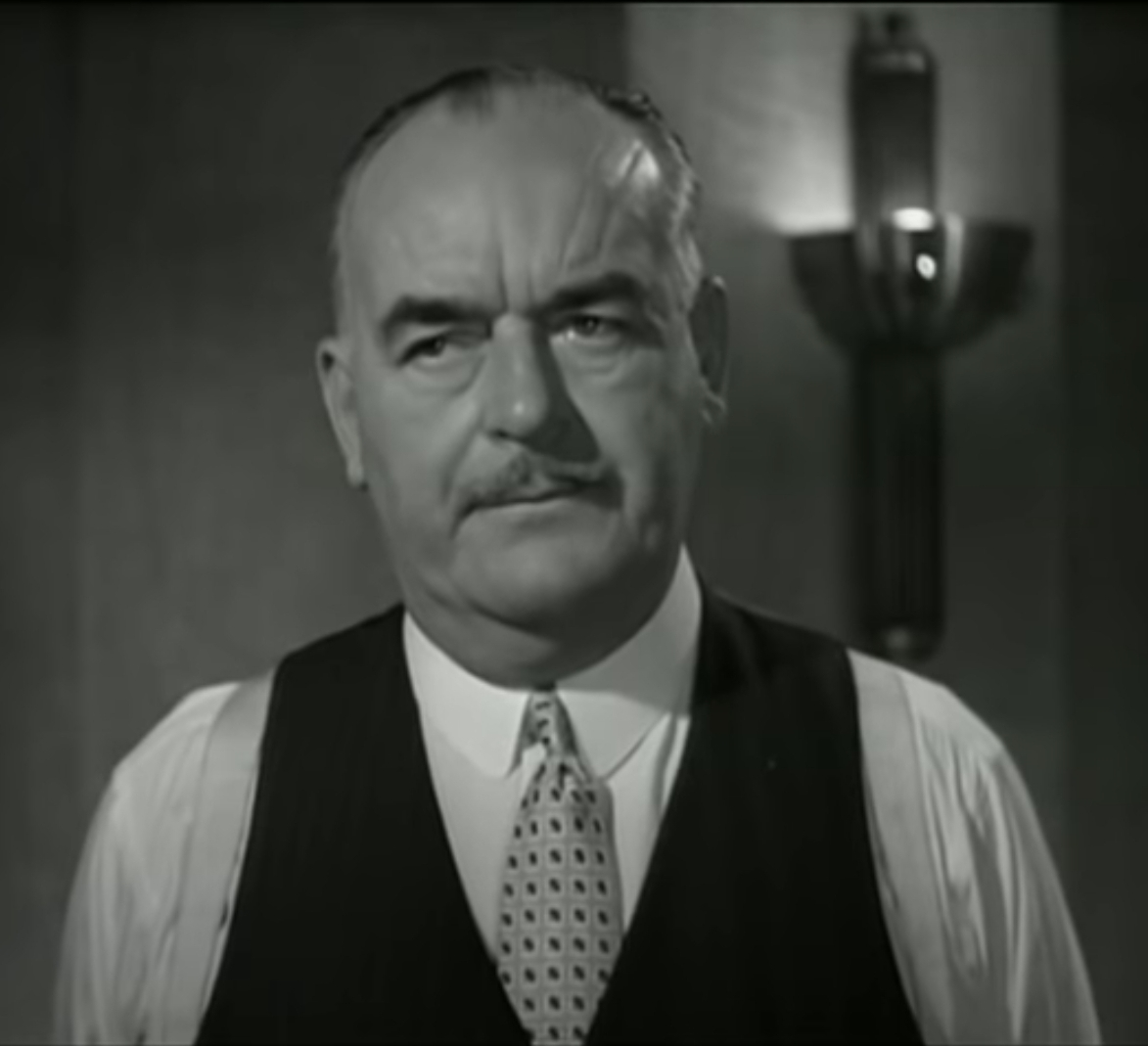
- Davidson in Dick Tracy's Dilemma (1947)
- Born: William Beatman Davidson; June 16, 1888; Dobbs Ferry, New York, U.S.
- Died: September 28, 1947 (aged 59); Santa Monica, California, U.S.
- Education: Columbia University
- Occupation: Actor
- Years active: 1915–1947
- Spouses: Mary Hellen Dorsey (m. 1916; div. 1932) Helen Bolton (m. 1934)

William Beatman Davidson (June 16, 1888 – September 28, 1947) was an American film actor. He appeared in more than 300 films between 1915 and 1947.

== Early life ==
Davidson was born in Dobbs Ferry, New York. He attended Columbia University, where he played football. He became a popular football star. This fame eventually led to his foray into motion pictures after he had spent some time as a lawyer.

== Career ==
Davidson started in films in 1914 with Vitagraph. His first Hollywood film was For the Honor of the Crew. Afterward, he appeared in many films, his best-known role was perhaps the Ship's captain in The Most Dangerous Game (1932). He supported well known stage and film actresses such as Ethel Barrymore, Mabel Taliaferro, Charlotte Walker, Olga Petrova, Viola Dana, June Caprice, Edna Goodrich, and Mae West.

== Death ==
He remained in show business until his sudden death in Santa Monica, California, after surgery in 1947.

== Partial filmography ==
- A Yellow Streak (1915)
- The Child of Destiny (1916)
- Her Debt of Honor (1916)
- The Pretenders (1916)
- The White Raven (1917)
- Mary Lawson's Secret (1917)
- The Call of Her People (1917)
- The Greatest Power (1917)
- The Trail of the Shadow (1917)
- The Lifted Veil (1917)
- Lady Barnacle (1917)
- More Truth Than Poetry (1917)
- Her Second Husband (1917)
- The Other Woman (1918)
- Friend Husband (1918)
- Ashes of Love (1918)
- The Whirlpool (1918)
- In Pursuit of Polly (1918)
- Why I Would Not Marry? (1918)
- The Gold Cure (1919)
- A Woman There Was (1919)
- La Belle Russe (1919)
- The Capitol (1919)
- Lure of Ambition (1919)
- A Child for Sale (1920)
- The Valley of Doubt (1920)
- Conceit (1921)
- The Girl from Nowhere (1921)
- Nobody (1921)
- Destiny's Isle (1922)
- Women and Gold (1925)
- Cradle Snatchers (1927)
- A Gentleman of Paris (1927)
- The Noose (1928)
- Good Morning, Judge (1928)
- Woman Trap (1929)
- Blaze o'Glory (1929)
- Painted Faces (1929)
- The Silver Horde (1930)
- Scarlet Pages (1930)
- Playboy of Paris (1930)
- Hell's Angels (1930)
- For the Defense (1930)
- The Costello Case (1930)
- The Silver Horde (1930)
- Hook, Line and Sinker (1930)
- No Limit (1931)
- Dishonored (1931)
- The Secret Call (1931)
- Graft (1931)
- The Menace (1932)
- Sky Devils (1932)
- Guilty or Not Guilty (1932)
- The Lost Squadron (1932)
- The Pride of the Legion (1932)
- The Most Dangerous Game (1932)
- The Intruder (1933)
- I'm No Angel (1933)
- Dangerously (1933)
- Easy to Love (1934)
- The Dragon Murder Case (1934)
- The Secret Bride (1934)
- Bordertown (1935)
- Devil Dogs of the Air (1935)
- Gold Diggers of 1937 (1936)
- Road Gang (1936)
- Marked Woman (1937) as Bob Crandall
- Easy Living (1937)
- Marry the Girl (1937)
- Behind the Mike (1937)
- Sergeant Murphy (1938) (uncredited)
- The Jury's Secret (1938)
- They Made Me a Criminal (1939)
- On Trial (1939)
- Naughty but Nice (1939)
- Each Dawn I Die (1939)
- Honeymoon in Bali (1939)
- Dust Be My Destiny (1939)
- My Little Chickadee (1940) (uncredited)
- Lillian Russell (1940)
- Granny Get Your Gun (1940)
- Hired Wife (1940)
- Seven Sinners (1940)
- Tin Pan Alley (1940)
- Sun Valley Serenade (1941)
- Hold That Ghost (1941)
- Highway West (1941)
- Uncle Joe (1941)
- The Male Animal (1942)
- The Great Man's Lady (1942)
- Gentleman Jim (1942)
- Larceny, Inc. (1942)
- In This Our Life (1942)
- Tennessee Johnson (1942) (uncredited)
- Yankee Doodle Dandy (1942) (uncredited)
- The Affairs of Martha (1942)
- The Magnificent Dope (1942)
- Mission to Moscow (1943) (uncredited)
- The Impostor aka Strange Confession (1944)
- In Society (1944)
- San Diego, I Love You (1944)
- My Darling Clementine (1946) (uncredited)
- The Farmer's Daughter (1947)
- Dick Tracy's Dilemma (1947)
- That's My Man (1947)
- My Wild Irish Rose (1947)
