= Her Husband's Honor =

Her Husband's Honor (aka: The Gadabout)
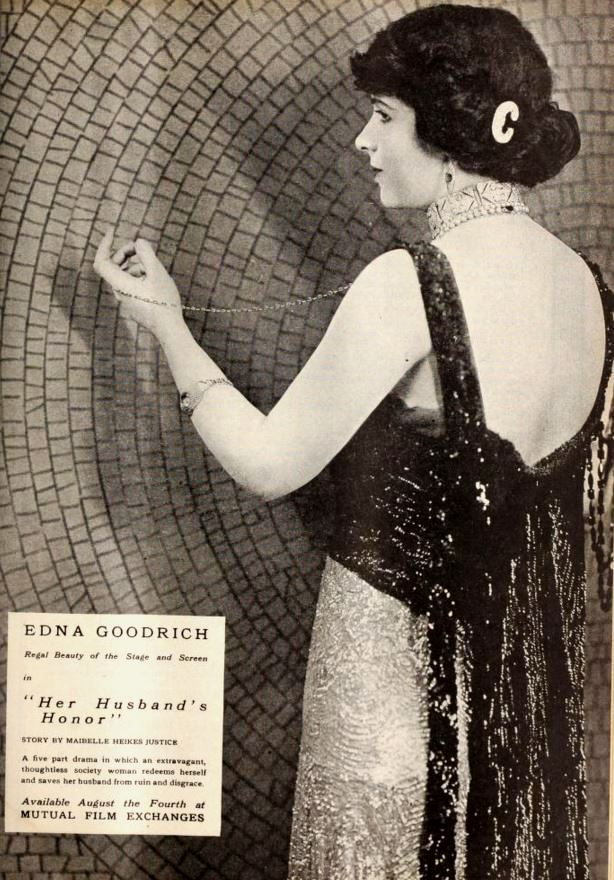
- Directed by: Burton L. King
- Written by: J. Clarkson Miller; Maibelle Heikes Justice
- Produced by: Mutual Film
- Starring: Edna Goodrich
- Cinematography: Sol Polito
- Distributed by: Mutual Film
- Release date: August 5, 1918
- Running time: 5 reels
- Country: United States
- Language: Silent (English intertitles)

Her Husband's Honor, also known under its working title of The Gadabout, is a 1918 American silent drama film directed by Burton L. King and starring Edna Goodrich. It was produced and distributed by Mutual Film.

== Cast ==
- Edna Goodrich as Nancy Page
- David Powell as Richard Page
- T. Tamamoto as Tato Usaki (credited as Thomas Tommamato)
- Barbara Allen as Lila Davenport
- Clarence Heritage as David Davenport

== Preservation ==
With no prints of Her Husband's Honor located in any film archives, it is a lost film.
