= Reputation (1917 film) =

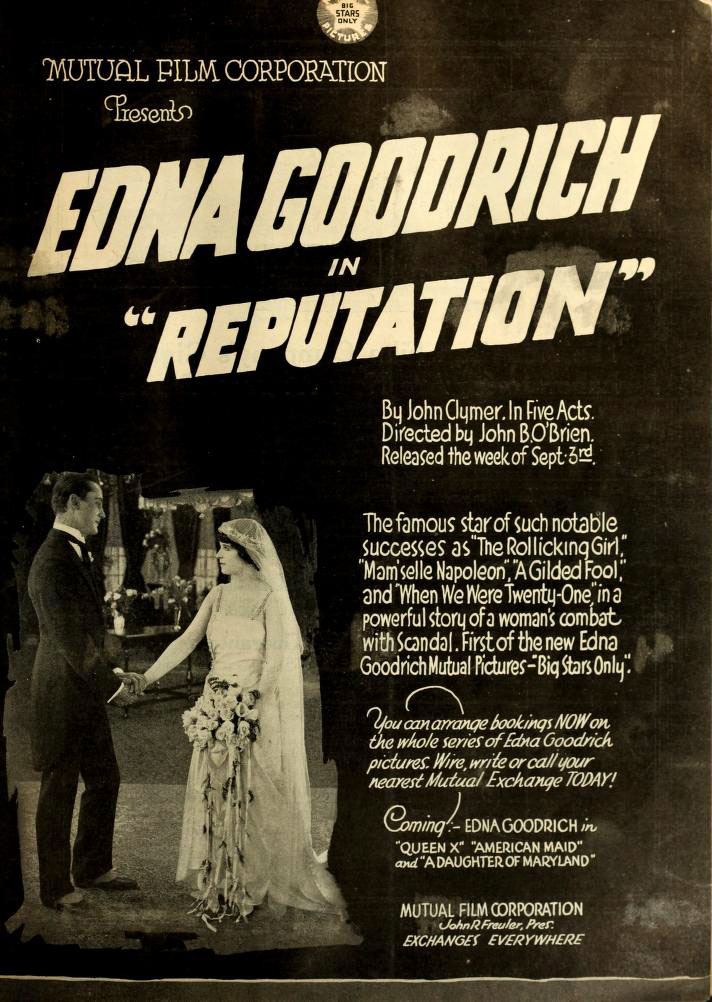
- Lobby poster
- Directed by: John B. O'Brien
- Written by: John B. Clymer
- Produced by: Frank Powell
- Starring: Edna Goodrich
- Cinematography: William Crowley
- Production company: Frank Powell Producing Corporation
- Distributed by: Mutual Film
- Release date: September 3, 1917
- Running time: 5 reels
- Country: United States
- Language: Silent (English intertitles)

Reputation is a lost 1917 American silent film drama film produced and distributed by the Mutual Film Company and starring Edna Goodrich. The film was directed by John B. O'Brien.

== Plot ==
As described in a film magazine, Constance Bennett (Goodrich) is determined to make sufficient money to set her aunt up in business before her marriage, so she goes to New York City to work as a model in a cloak house. The manager Edmund Berste (Goldsmith), who has a jealous wife (Lee), takes a liking to Constance. The wife learns of this and goes to Constance's home town and denounces her. When Constance returns home, no one will have anything to do with her, so she returns to New York where her former employer Berste sets a trap for her. In order to save herself, Constance shoots Berste. However, at the trial she is acquitted, and shortly thereafter she and John Clavering (Hinckley) are married.

== Cast ==
- Edna Goodrich - Constance Bennett
- William Hinckley - John Clavering
- Frank Goldsmith - Edmund Berste
- Carey Lee - Mrs. Berste
- Esther Evans - Nellie Burns, Stenographer
- Nellie Parker Spaulding - Mrs. Williams
- Mathilde Brundage - Mrs. Clavering (credited as Mrs. Mathilde Brudage)
