= Treason (1918 film) =

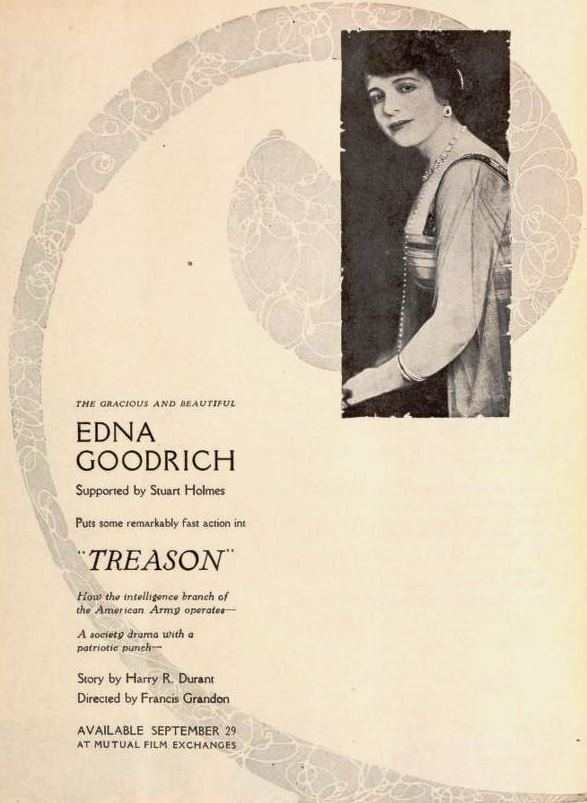
- Advertisement
- Directed by: Burton L. King
- Written by: J. Clarkson Miller
- Story by: Harry R. Durant
- Produced by: Mutual Film
- Starring: Edna Goodrich
- Cinematography: Sol Polito
- Distributed by: Mutual Film
- Release date: September 29, 1918
- Running time: Approximately 50 minutes (5 reels)
- Country: United States
- Language: Silent (English intertitles)

Treason is a 1918 American 5-reel silent drama film directed by Burton L. King and starring Edna Goodrich. It was produced and distributed by Mutual Film Company and apparently was the last film released before the company ceased operations in 1918.

== Cast ==
- Edna Goodrich as The Wife
- Howard Hall as The Husband
- Mildred Clair as Child
- Clarence Heritage as Major McClintock
- Stuart Holmes as Anton Tell / Herr McGraff Von Aachen

== Preservation ==
With no prints of Treason located in any film archives, it is a lost film.
