= Teeth (1924 film) =

1924 film

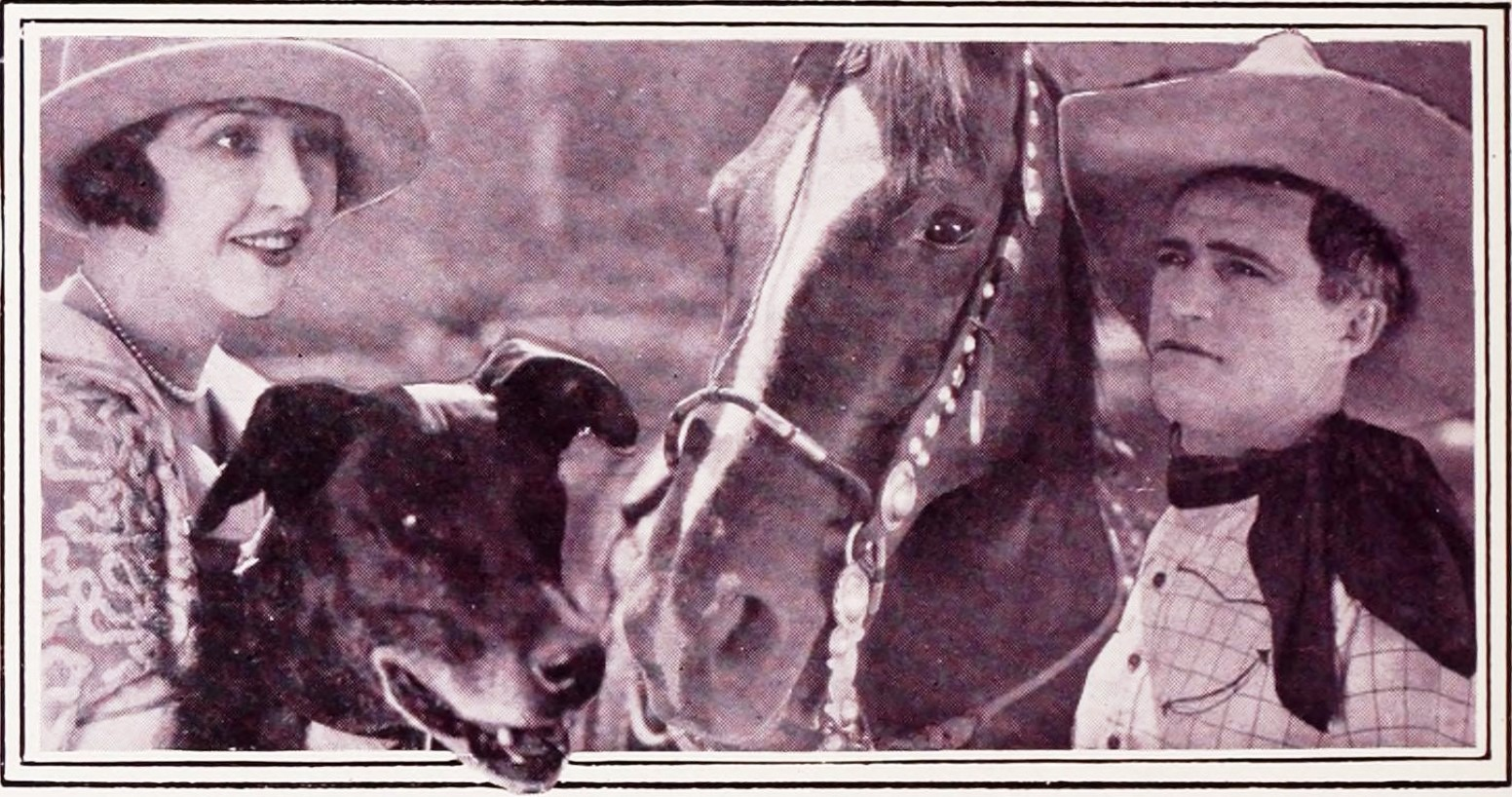
- Still
- Directed by: John G. Blystone
- Screenplay by: Donald W. Lee
- Based on: Teeth by: Clinton H. Stagg; Virginia Hudson Brightman
- Starring: Tom Mix; Lucy Fox; George Bancroft; Edward Peil Sr. Lucien Littlefield
- Production company: Fox Film Corporation
- Distributed by: Fox Film Corporation
- Release date: November 2, 1924
- Running time: 70 minutes
- Country: United States
- Languages: Silent; English intertitles

Teeth is a 1924 American silent Western film directed by John G. Blystone and written by Donald W. Lee. The film stars Tom Mix, Lucy Fox, George Bancroft, Edward Peil Sr., and Lucien Littlefield. The film was released on November 2, 1924, by Fox Film Corporation.

== Plot ==
As described in a review in a film magazine, Dan Angus, train baggage master, mistreats two dogs in his care throwing the small one off, while the big one attacks him. Dan is fired and gets off at a small town, steals from the postmaster and kills him. Dave Deering, a prospector finds the large dog and rechristens him “Teeth.” Paula Grayson, the owner of the dogs comes back to the town to find them. Dan frames Dave who is arrested for the murder, but with the aid of “Teeth” escapes to the woods. Paula follows with Dan after her. Dan attacks Paula and puts her in a cabin, accidentally setting the forest on fire. Teeth gets Dave who rescues Paula. Dave takes her to a waterhole while Teeth brings the horse Tony. After the fire, Dan who has been caught in the flames, confesses and Paula confesses her love for Dave, thus ending the dispute as to which shall keep Teeth.

== Cast ==
- Tom Mix as Dave Deering
- Lucy Fox as Paula Grayson
- George Bancroft as Dan Angus
- Edward Peil Sr. as Sheriff
- Lucien Littlefield as Under-sheriff
- Tony the Horse as Tony
- Duke the Dog as Teeth

== Preservation ==
A complete print of Teeth is in the Library of Congress collection.
