= Toilers of the Sea (1923 film) =

1923 silent film

- Directed by: Roy William Neill
- Based on: Toilers of the Sea by Victor Hugo
- Produced by: Roy William Neill
- Starring: Lucy Fox; Holmes Herbert; Horace Tesseron
- Cinematography: Carlos Edwin Corwin; Giovanni Ventimiglia
- Production company: Community International Corporation
- Distributed by: Selznick Pictures
- Release date: July 21, 1923
- Running time: 60 minutes
- Country: United States
- Language: Silent (English intertitles)

Toilers of the Sea is a lost 1923 American silent drama film directed by Roy William Neill and starring Lucy Fox, Holmes Herbert and Horace Tesseron. It is an adaptation of Victor Hugo's novel of the same title.

== Plot ==
As described in a film magazine review, Captain Jean and his daughter Hélène live in an Italian fishing hamlet. Captain André persuades him to induce the villagers to invest their savings in a project to purchase trading vessels. André embezzles the money and hides it in the volcanic crater of Mount Etna. Sandro, in love with Hélène, trails André to the mountains. A fight takes place, André is killed, and Sandro takes the money back to the villagers. Hélène and Sandro then wed.

== Cast ==
- Lucy Fox as Hélène
- Holmes Herbert as Sandro
- Horace Tesseron as Captain Jean
- Dell Cawley as Captain André
- Lucius Henderson as The Priest

== Production ==
Toilers of the Sea was filmed in Italy.

== Bibliography ==
- Goble, Alan. The Complete Index to Literary Sources in Film. Walter de Gruyter, 1999.
