= Lucy Fox =

American actress

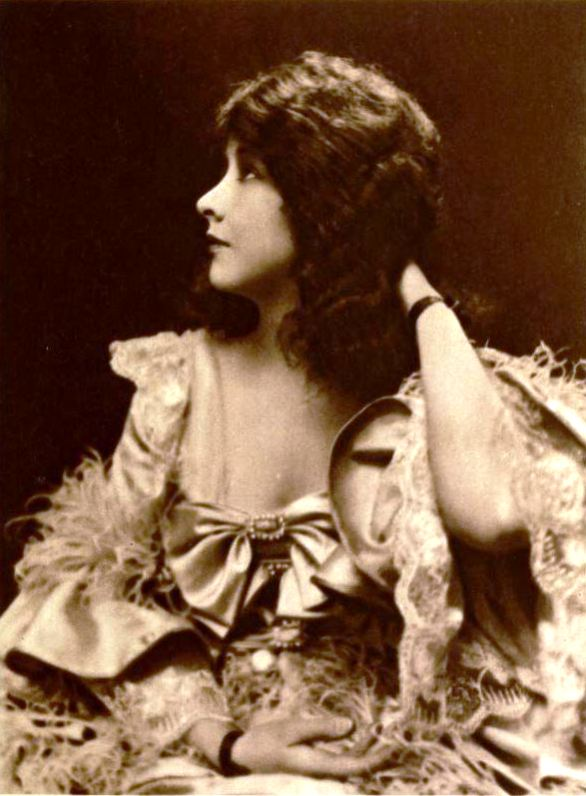
- Fox in Photoplay, September 1921
- Born: Lucinda Margaret Fox; October 25, 1897; New York, New York, United States
- Died: May 21, 1970 (aged 72); Palm Beach, Florida, United States
- Occupation: Actress
- Years active: 1918-1926 (film)

Lucinda Margaret Fox (October 25, 1897 – May 21, 1970) was an American actress active in the era of silent film.

== Early life and career ==
A native New Yorker, Fox was the youngest of four children born to Margaret McNally and celebrated Manhattan fire fighter, Capt. George J. Fox. At age 11, Fox got her first taste of media puffery as putative author of an extended account, published in The New York Sun, detailing the life and times of Mike, recently departed canine mascot of Engine 11, the FDNY outpost overseen by her father. She later attended St. Anne's Academy in Providence, Rhode Island.

In January 1921, Fox was one of a host of Hollywood players—including Dick Barthelmess, Dorothy and Lillian Gish, William Boyd, Mae Murray, Rod La Rocque and many others—appearing at New York's Hotel Astor for a New York Daily News fund-raiser benefitting New York's shoeless schoolchildren. It was later that year that Fox, at the suggestion of actress Ruth Roland, first tried her hand at serials, beginning with Hurricane Hutch, and following up in 1922 with Speed.

== Personal life and death ==
Fox retired from acting following her marriage, on April 14, 1925, to New York-based silk manufacturer Jules Louis Foreman.

Predeceased by her husband, Fox died at age 72 in Palm Beach, Florida on May 21, 1970.

== Partial filmography ==
- Just for Tonight (1918)
- Why I Would Not Marry? (1918)
- The Bishop's Emeralds (1919)
- The Winchester Woman (1919)
- Something Different (1920)
- The Flaming Clue (1920)
- The Empire of Diamonds (1920)
- Hurricane Hutch (1921)
- The Money Maniac (1921)
- My Old Kentucky Home (1922)
- Sonny (1922)
- What Fools Men Are (1922)
- Speed (1922)
- Toilers of the Sea (1923)
- The Lone Wolf (1924)
- Miami (1924)
- Teeth (1924)
- The Trail Rider (1925)
- The Necessary Evil (1925)
- The Arizona Romeo (1925)
- Bluebeard's Seven Wives (1926)

== Bibliography ==
- Solomon, Aubrey. The Fox Film Corporation, 1915-1935: A History and Filmography. McFarland, 2011. ISBN 978-0-7864-6286-5
