= Armstrong's Wife =

1915 American drama silent film directed by George Melford

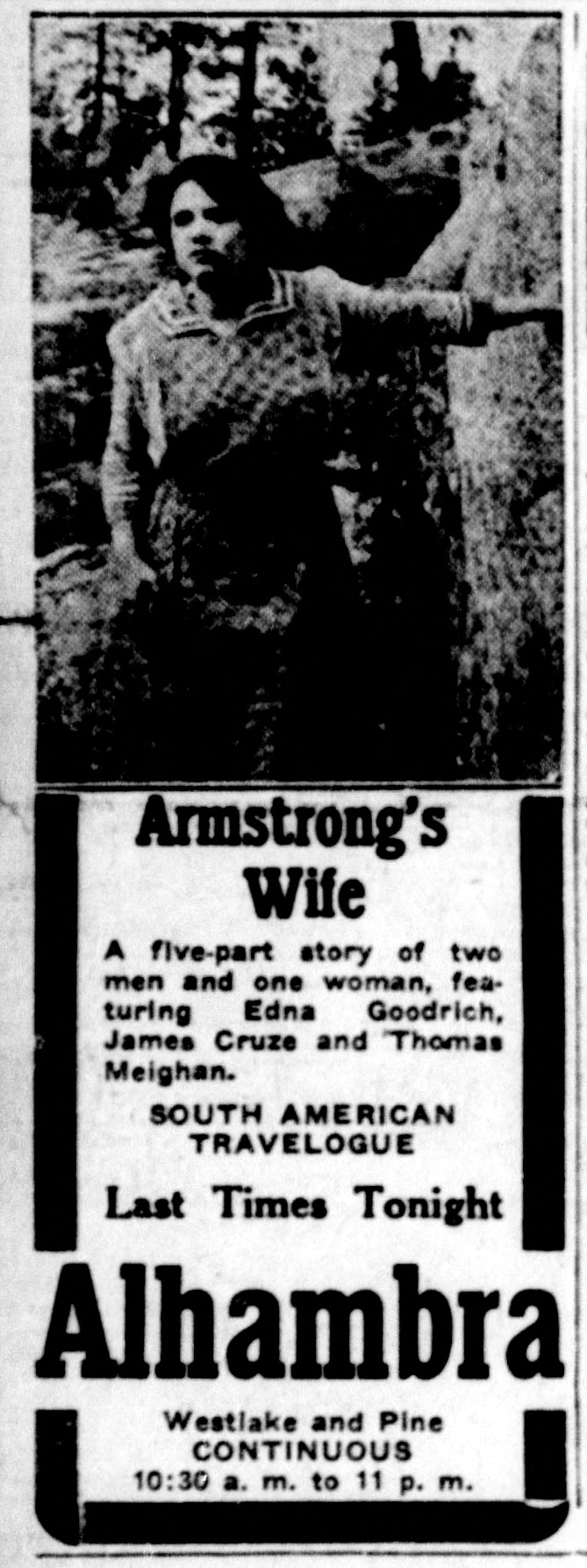
- Newspaper advertisement
- Directed by: George Melford
- Screenplay by: Margaret Turnbull
- Produced by: Jesse L. Lasky
- Starring: Edna Goodrich; Thomas Meighan; James Cruze; Hal Clements; Ernest Joy; Raymond Hatton
- Production company: Jesse L. Lasky Feature Play Company
- Distributed by: Paramount Pictures
- Release date: November 18, 1915
- Running time: 50 minutes
- Country: United States
- Language: English

Armstrong's Wife is a 1915 American silent drama film directed by George Melford and written by Margaret Turnbull. The film stars Edna Goodrich, Thomas Meighan, James Cruze, Hal Clements, Ernest Joy and Raymond Hatton. The film was released on November 18, 1915, by Paramount Pictures.

This film is now lost.

== Plot ==
The film is about a young woman who is liked by two men. She spends a few months liking one of them but she finds out he is married already. So because she was disappointed, she agrees to go out to the Canadian countryside with the other man. In the end, all three end up meeting together.

== Cast ==
- Edna Goodrich as May Fielding
- Thomas Meighan as David Armstrong
- James Cruze as Harvey Arnold
- Hal Clements as Jack Estabrook
- Ernest Joy as Detective
- Raymond Hatton as Runner
- Horace B. Carpenter as Police Inspector
- Mrs. Lewis McCord as Landlady
