= What Fools Men Are =

1922 film

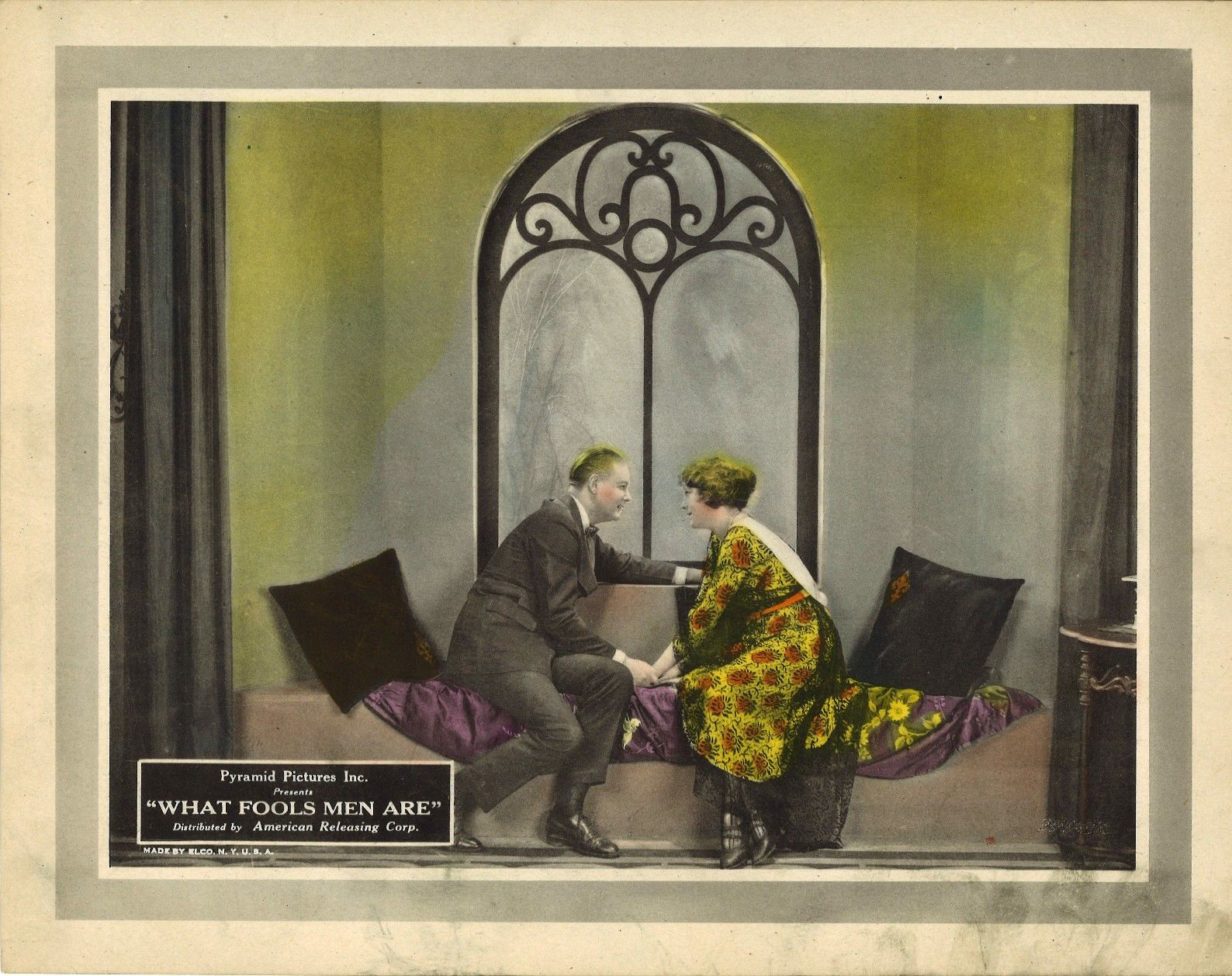
- Directed by: George Terwilliger
- Written by: Peter Milne
- Based on: The Flapper by Eugene Walter
- Starring: Faire Binney; Lucy Fox; Huntley Gordon
- Cinematography: Ralph Mariner
- Production company: Pyramid Pictures
- Distributed by: American Releasing Corporation
- Release date: October 29, 1922
- Running time: 60 minutes
- Country: United States
- Language: Silent (English intertitles)

What Fools Men Are is a 1922 American silent comedy drama film directed by George Terwilliger and starring Faire Binney, Lucy Fox, and Huntley Gordon. It is based upon the play The Flapper by Eugene Walter.

== Plot ==
As described in a film magazine review, Peggy Kendricks, the gayest and most daring of society flappers, allows her brother-in-law Bartley Claybourne to secretly pay for her beautiful clothes. Her sister Kate finds discovers the truth and declares that she will name Peggy co-respondent in her divorce proceedings. She goes to Reno under the understanding that Bartley will eventually marry Peggy. However, Peggy has no such notion and suddenly marries Ralph Demarest, a young man whose father Horace detests flappers. Horace offers her money to separate from his son which, true to her form, she accepts. She then uses the money and, in the end, wins the love and respect of her former victims

== Cast ==
- Faire Binney as Peggy Kendricks
- Lucy Fox as Ola
- Joseph Striker as Ralph Demarest
- Huntley Gordon as Bartley Claybourne
- Florence Billings as Kate Claybourne
- J. Barney Sherry as Horace Demrest
- Templar Saxe as Bayard Thomas
- Harry Clay Blaney as Steve O'Mally

== Bibliography ==
- Connelly, Robert B. The Silents: Silent Feature Films, 1910-36, Volume 40, Issue 2. December Press, 1998.
- Munden, Kenneth White. The American Film Institute Catalog of Motion Pictures Produced in the United States, Part 1. University of California Press, 1997.
