= A Daughter of Maryland =

- Directed by: John B. O'Brien
- Written by: Sam Morse; Joseph F. Poland
- Produced by: Mutual Film
- Starring: Edna Goodrich
- Cinematography: William Crolly
- Distributed by: Mutual Film
- Release date: October 29, 1917
- Running time: 5 reels
- Country: USA
- Language: Silent (English intertitles)

A Daughter of Maryland is a lost 1917 silent film drama directed by John B. O'Brien and starring Edna Goodrich. It was produced and released by Mutual Film.

== Cast ==
- Edna Goodrich - Beth Treadway
- William T. Carleton - Major Treadway (*William T. Carlton)
- Helen Strickland - Sarah Treadway
- Carlton Brickert - John Standish (*Carl Brickett)
- Jack Hopkins - Rippley
- Charles Martin - Pennell
- Florence Miller - Dorothy Pennell
- Morgan Thorpe - Haskell
- S. J. Burton - Neb
- Myra Brooks - Mandy
- Frederick Truesdell - (*Fred Truesdell)
