= The Trail Rider =

1925 film

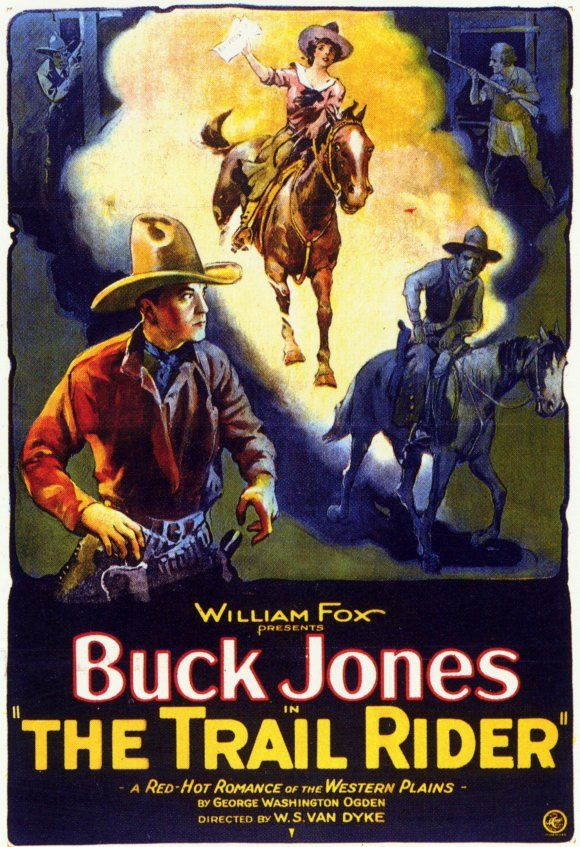
- Theatrical release poster
- Directed by: W. S. Van Dyke
- Screenplay by: Thomas Dixon Jr.
- Based on: The Trail Rider by George Washington Ogden
- Produced by: William Fox
- Starring: Buck Jones
- Cinematography: Reginald Lyons
- Production company: Fox Film Corp.
- Distributed by: Fox Film Corp.
- Release date: February 22, 1925 (US)
- Running time: 50 minutes; 4,752 feet, 5 reels
- Country: United States
- Languages: Silent; English intertitles

The Trail Rider is a 1925 American silent Western film directed by W. S. Van Dyke and starring Buck Jones. Based on the 1924 novel The Trail Rider: A Romance of the Kansas Range by George Washington Ogden, the film is about a trail rider hired to protect ranchers from the actions of a corrupt banker. The film was produced by Fox Film Corp. and was released on February 22, 1925, in the United States. It marked Gary Cooper’s film debut as a stunt rider. It is not known whether the film currently survives.

== Plot ==
Tex Hartwell rescues an old cobbler from the physical assault of corrupt banker Jim Mackey. When Mackey orders his hired guns to kill Tex, the stranger outdraws them. Rancher Dee Winch is impressed with Tex's fast draw and hires him as a trail rider, tasked with keeping diseased cattle off of his land.

Sometime later, Mackey's men stampede a herd of infected cattle onto Winch's land. When Winch learns of the infected cattle, he fires Tex, who leaves in disgrace. Meanwhile, Tex learns from Fanny Goodnight that Mackey was behind the stampede of infected cattle. Tex confronts the corrupt banker and forces him to sign a confession admitting to his guilt. Later, the old cobbler kills Mackey, Tex's reputation is restored with the cattlemen, and he and Fanny ride trail together on their own.

== Cast ==
- Buck Jones as Tex Hartwell
- Nancy Deaver as Sally McCoy
- Lucy Fox as Fanny Goodnight
- Carl Stockdale as Jim Mackey
- Jack McDonald as Dee Winch
- George Berrell as Uncle Boley
- Jack Rollens as Ollie, the barber
- Will Walling as Malcolm Duncan
- Silver the Horse
- Gary Cooper as A rider (uncredited)

== Production ==
The Trail Rider is based on the 1924 novel, The Trail Rider: A Romance of the Kansas Range by George Washington Ogden (New York).

== Release ==
The film was released in Austria as Steppenehre. It is not known whether the film currently survives.
