= Hurricane Hutch =

1921 film

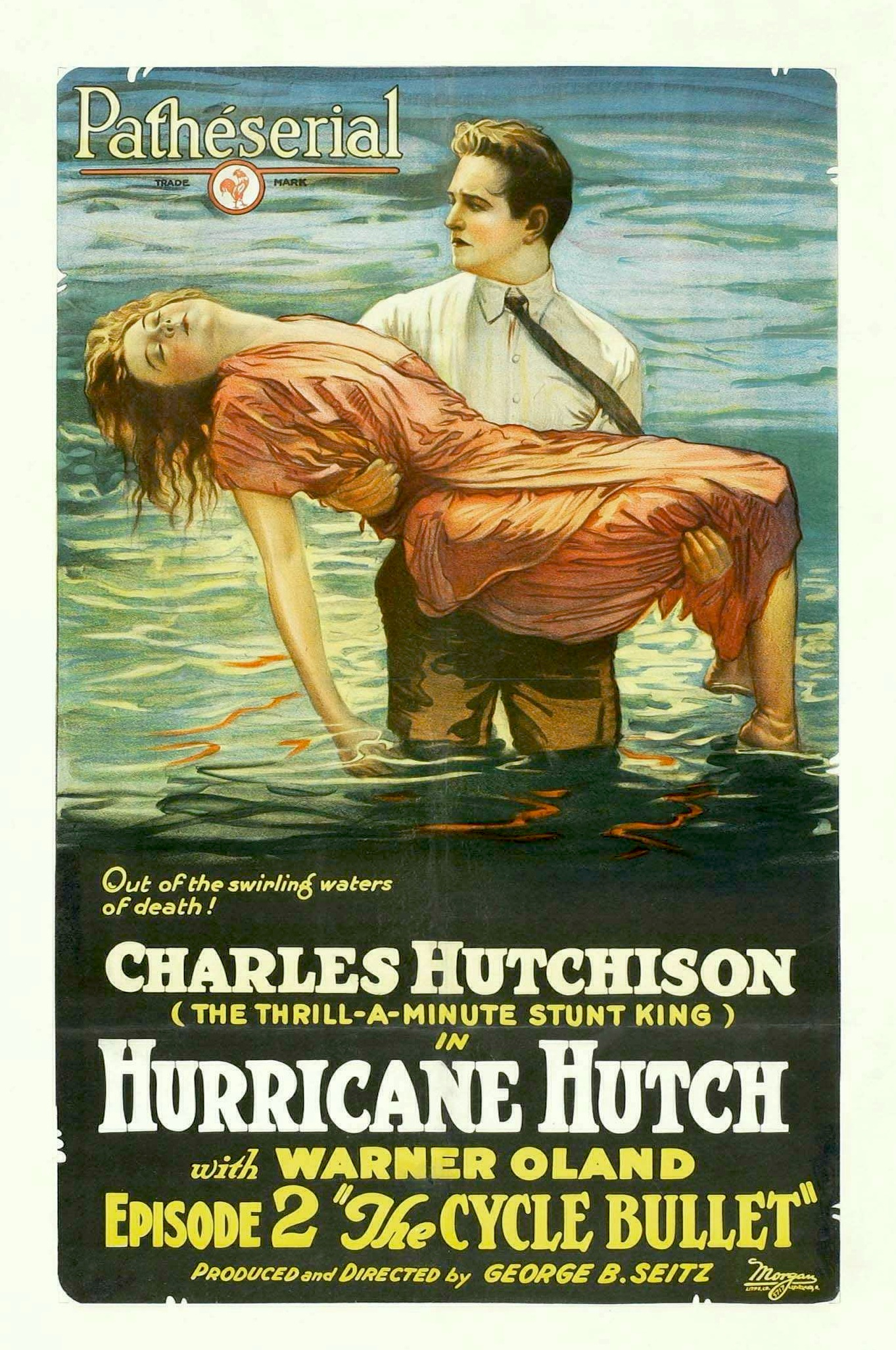
- Film poster
- Directed by: George B. Seitz
- Written by: Charles Hutchison
- Produced by: George B. Seitz
- Starring: Charles Hutchison; Lucy Fox
- Production company: George B. Seitz Productions
- Distributed by: Pathé Exchange
- Release date: September 25, 1921
- Running time: 15 episodes
- Country: United States
- Languages: Silent; English intertitles

Hurricane Hutch is a 1921 American adventure film serial directed by George B. Seitz. The film is considered to be lost. The story concerns the search for a lost formula for making paper from seaweed that will save a mortgaged papermill.

== Cast ==
- Charles Hutchison as Larry 'Hutch' Hutchdale
- Lucy Fox as Nancy Kellogg
- Warner Oland as Clifton Marlow
- Diana Deer as Belle Brinkley
- Ann Hastings as Ann Haviland
- Harry Semels as Jim Tiegerley
- Frank Redman as John Brinkley
- Tom Goodwin as Silas Haviland (as Tomas G. Goodwin)
- Charles 'Patch' Revada as Bill Hogan (as Charles Revada)
- Joe Cuny as Wilson Winslow

== Chapter titles ==
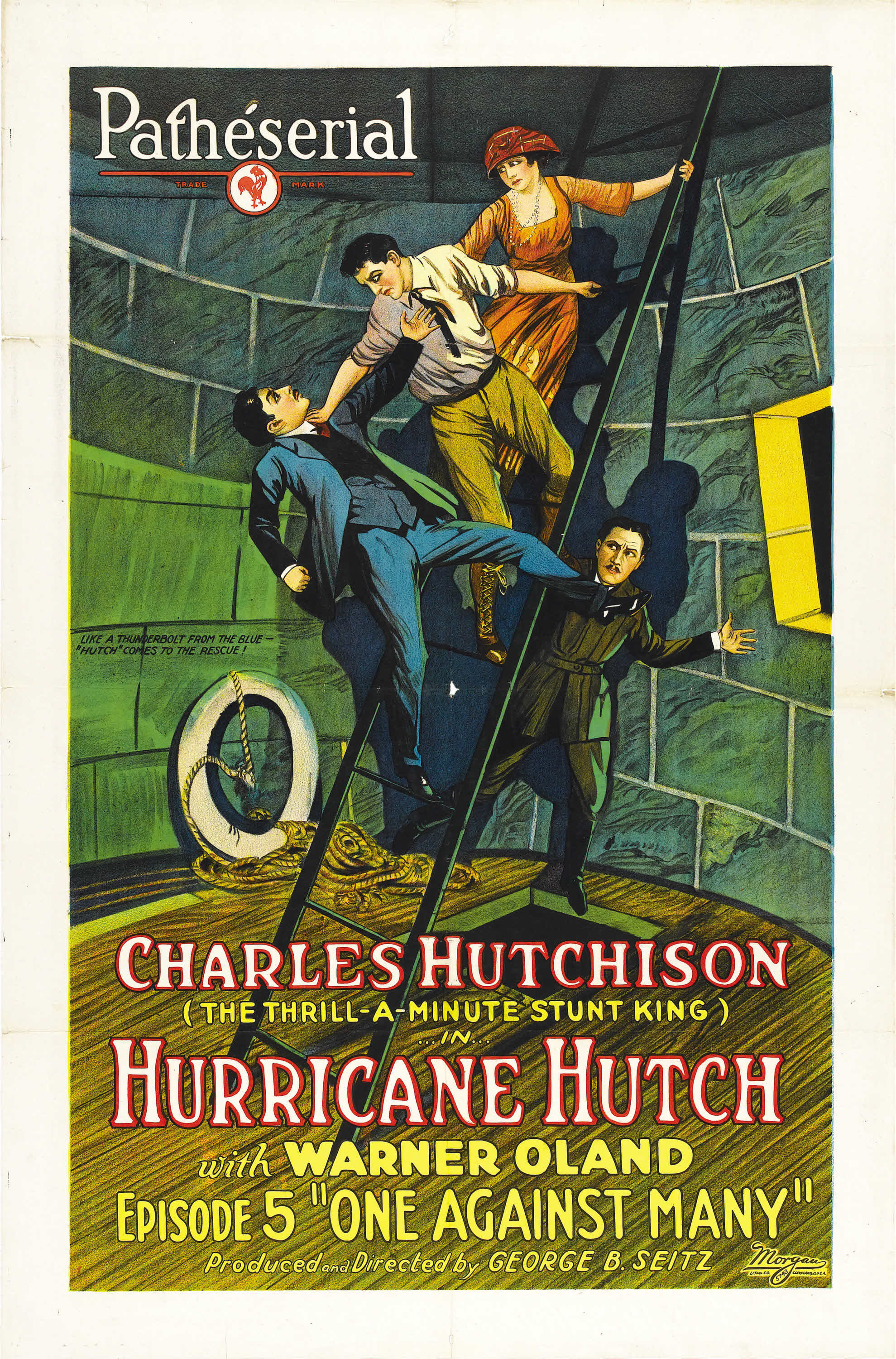
Poster for the fifth episode

1. The Secret Cipher
2. The Cycle Bullet
3. The Millionth Chance
4. Smashing Through
5. One Against Many
6. At the Risk of his Neck
7. On a Dangerous Coast
8. Double Crossed
9. Overboard
10. The Show Down
11. Hare and Hounds
12. Red Courage
13. Neck and Neck
14. The Secret of the Flame
15. The Last Duel

== See also ==
- List of film serials
- List of film serials by studio
- List of lost films

== Bibliography ==
- Lahue, Kalton C., Continued Next Week: A History of the Moving Picture Serial (University of Oklahoma Press, 1964)
