= The Arizona Romeo =

1925 film

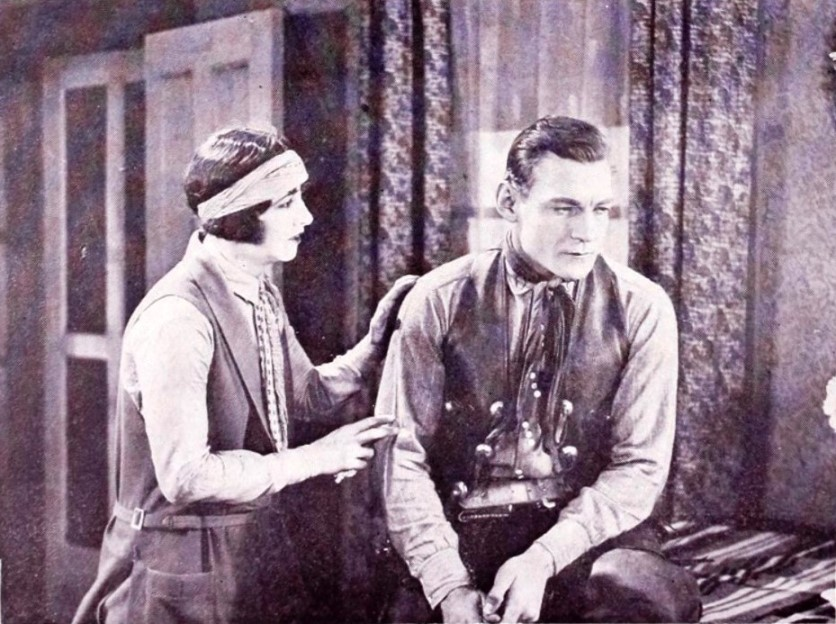
- Still with Fox and Jones
- Directed by: Edmund Mortimer
- Written by: Charles Kenyon
- Produced by: William Fox
- Starring: Buck Jones; Lucy Fox; Bud Geary
- Production company: Fox Film Corporation
- Distributed by: Fox Film Corporation
- Release date: January 4, 1925
- Running time: 50 minutes
- Country: United States
- Languages: Silent; English intertitles

The Arizona Romeo is a lost 1925 American silent Western film directed by Edmund Mortimer and starring Buck Jones, Lucy Fox, and Bud Geary.

== Plot ==
As described in a review in a film magazine, the more violent the opposition on the part of her father John Wayne, the more determined is Sylvia to marry Richard Barr even though she does not really love him. She slips away with her maid and arranges for John to meet her in Arizona. Tom Long is disgusted to find that his cowboys are all getting manicures, and that Sylvia and her maid are responsible, posing as manicurists in a local shop. In seeking to save Sylvia from the attentions of a tough guy, he loses his heart to her. Richard appears on the scene and Sylvia tells Tom why she came to Arizona. Tom agrees to help her and leads the sheriff off the track by posing as Richard. Sylvia and Richard make a getaway on the train. Sylvia's father reveals that his opposition to the marriage was a ruse, knowing that she would always be more determined to do the opposite of anything he recommended. Tom rides after the train, takes Sylvia off, and she readily agrees to marry him.

== Cast ==
- Buck Jones as Tom Long
- Lucy Fox as Sylvia Wayne
- Bud Geary as Richard Barr
- Thomas R. Mills as Sam Barr
- Hardee Kirkland as John Wayne
- Marcella Daly as Mary
- Lydia Yeamans Titus as Martha
- Harvey Clark as Sheriff
- Hank Mann as Deputy

== Preservation ==
With no prints of The Arizona Romeo located in any film archives, it is a lost film.

== Bibliography ==
- Solomon, Aubrey. The Fox Film Corporation, 1915-1935: A History and Filmography. McFarland, 2011. ISBN 978-0-7864-6286-5
