= The Empire of Diamonds =

1920 film

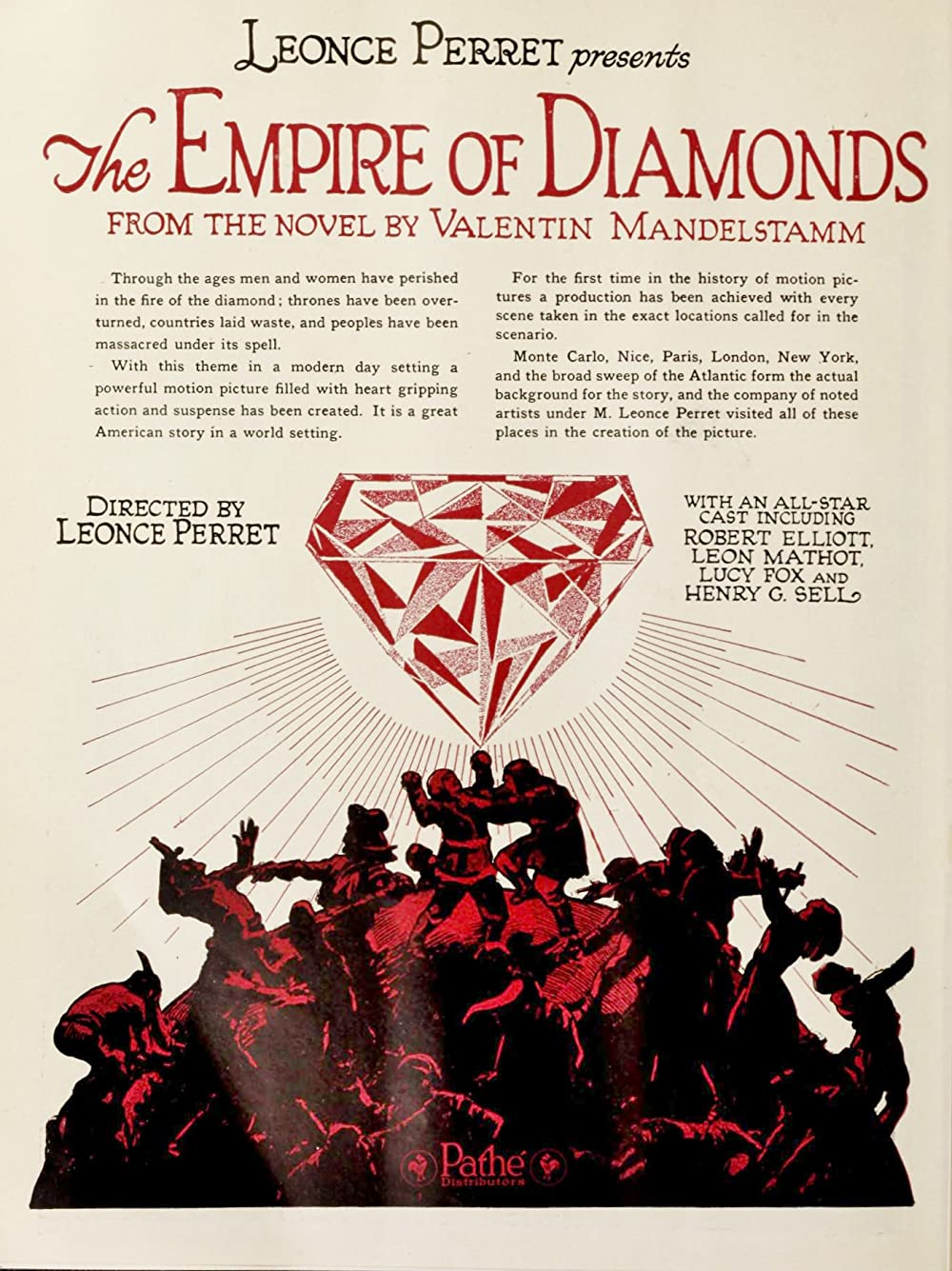
- Directed by: Léonce Perret
- Written by: Léonce Perret
- Based on: The Empire of Diamonds by Valentin Mandelstamm
- Produced by: Léonce Perret
- Starring: Robert Elliott; Lucy Fox; Léon Mathot
- Cinematography: René Guissart; Harry Hardi; Alfred Ortlieb
- Production company: Léonce Perret Productions
- Distributed by: Pathé Exchange
- Release date: December 19, 1920
- Running time: 60 minutes
- Country: United States
- Languages: Silent; English intertitles

The Empire of Diamonds is a 1920 American silent crime film directed by Léonce Perret and starring Robert Elliott, Lucy Fox and Léon Mathot.

== Cast ==
- Robert Elliott as Matthew Versigny
- Lucy Fox as Marguerite Versigny
- Henry G. Sell as Paul Bernac
- Léon Mathot as Arthur Graves
- Jacques Volnys as Trazi d'Aricola
- Laurent Morléas as Andre Zarnoff
- Fernand Mailly as Baron de Lambri
- Ruth Hunter as Esther Taylor

== Bibliography ==
- Connelly, Robert B. The Silents: Silent Feature Films, 1910-36, Volume 40, Issue 2. December Press, 1998.
