= Just for Tonight (film) =

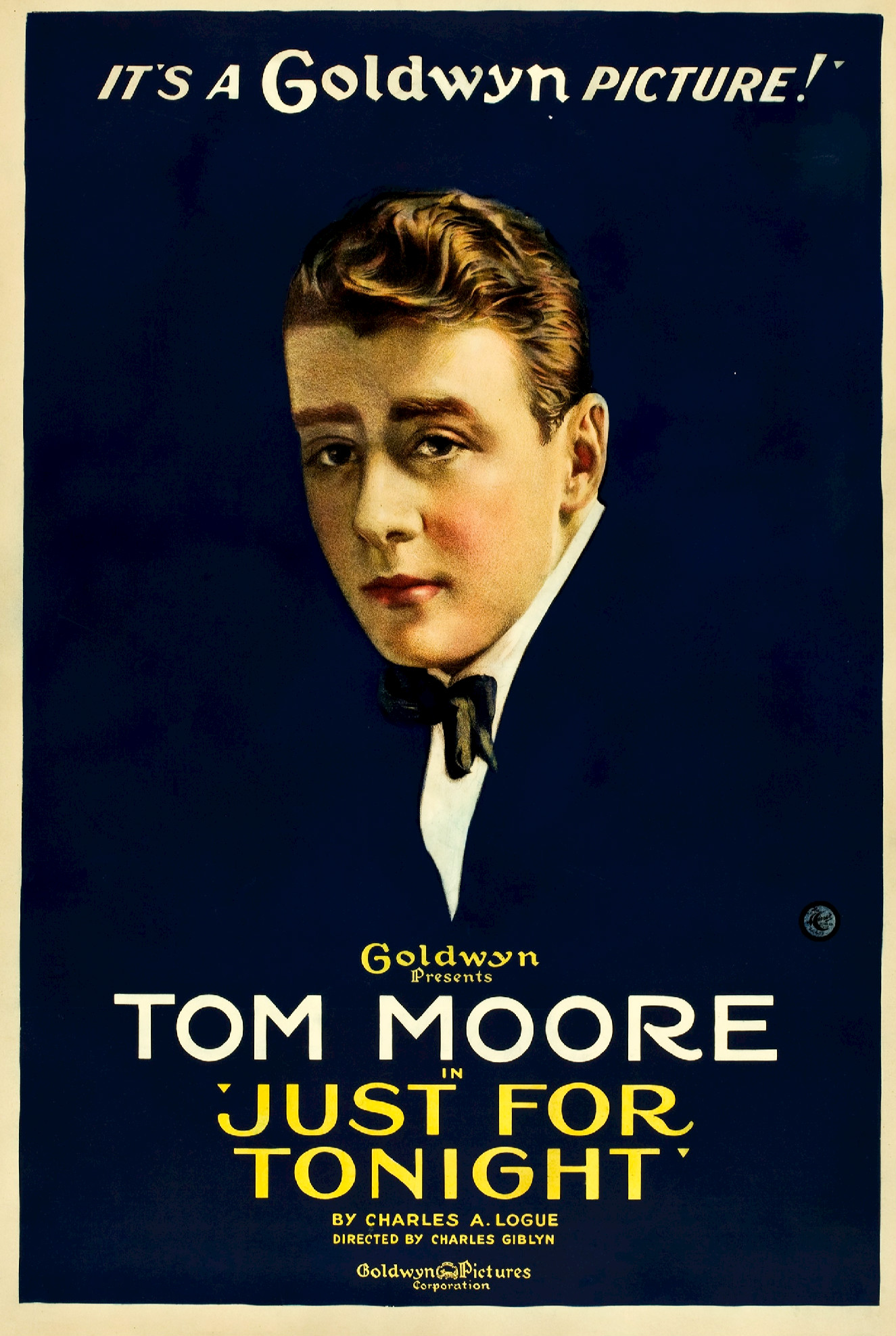
- Film poster
- Directed by: Charles Giblyn
- Written by: J. Clarkson Miller (scenario)
- Story by: Charles Logue
- Produced by: Goldwyn Pictures
- Starring: Tom Moore; Lucy Fox
- Cinematography: Lloyd Lewis
- Distributed by: Goldwyn Pictures
- Release date: September 16, 1918
- Running time: 5 reels
- Country: United States
- Language: Silent (English intertitles)

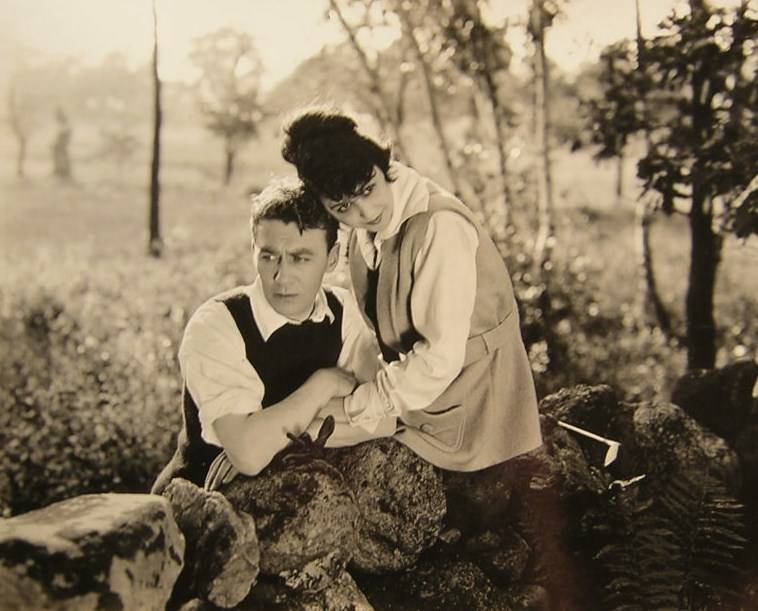
a scene in the film

Just for Tonight is a 1918 American silent comedy-drama film directed by Charles Giblyn and starring Tom Moore. It was produced and distributed by Goldwyn Pictures, one of the predecessors of MGM.

== Cast ==
- Tom Moore as Theodore Whitney Jr.
- Lucy Fox as Betty Blake
- Henry Sedley as Crandall
- Henry Hallam as Major Blackburn
- Robert Broderick as Theodore 'Ted' Whitney Sr.
- Ethel Grey Terry as Lady Roxenham
- Eddie Sturgis as Detective Chase (credited as Edwin Sturgis)
- Phil Ryley as The Butler
- Maude Turner Gordon as Mrs. Blackburn

== Reception ==
Variety's review was positive, giving praise to the supporting cast and direction, describing the film as "excellent."

== Preservation status ==
A complete copy of Just for Tonight is held at Insituto Valenciano De Cinematografia, Valencia in Spain.
