= Why I Would Not Marry? =

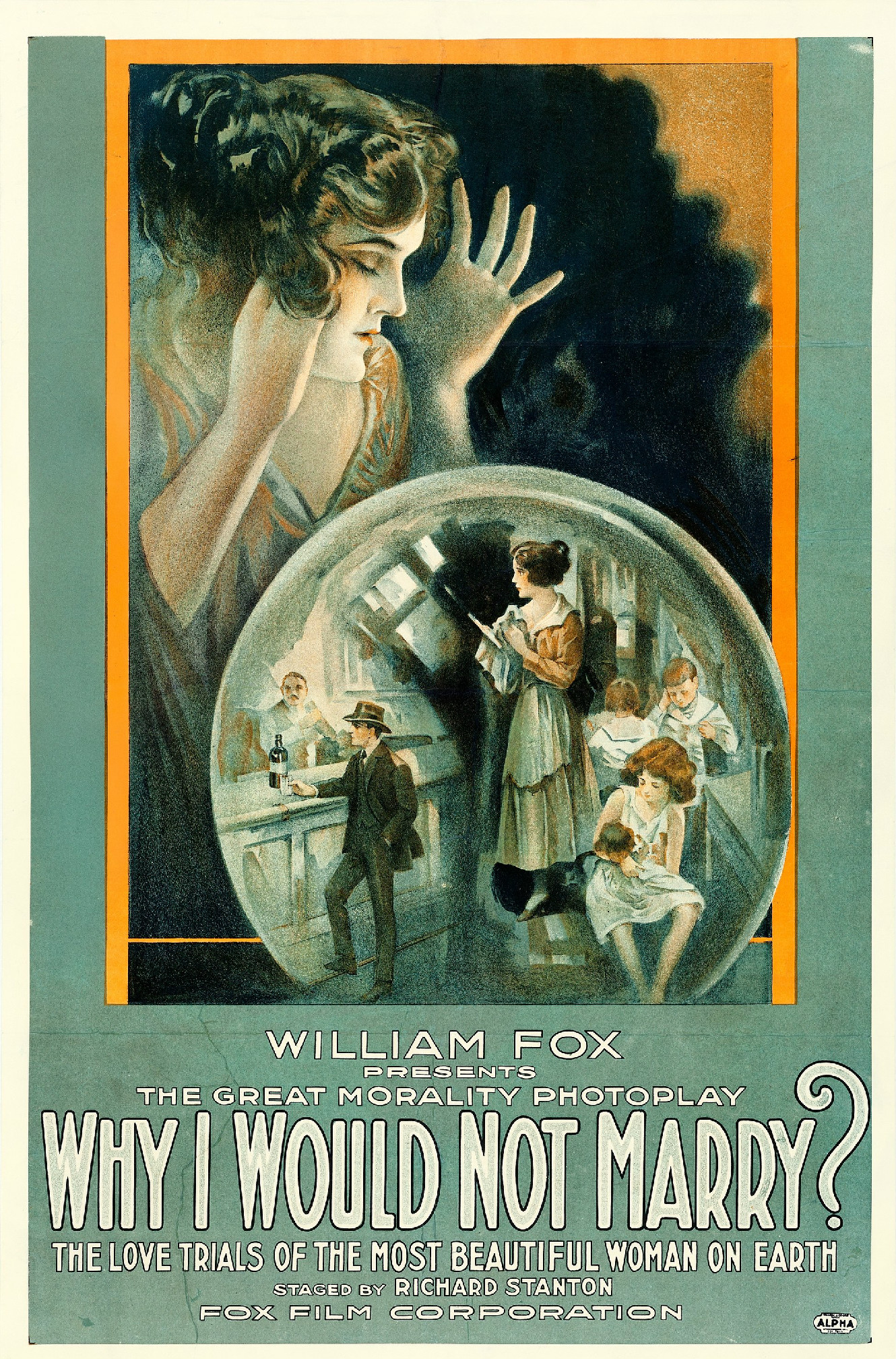
- lobby poster
- Directed by: Richard Stanton
- Written by: Adrian Johnson (scenario, story)
- Produced by: William Fox
- Starring: Lucy Fox
- Cinematography: Horace G. Plimpton Jr.
- Distributed by: Fox Film Corporation
- Release date: November 24, 1918
- Running time: 6 reels
- Country: USA
- Language: Silent...English intertitles

Why I Would Not Marry? is a lost 1918 silent film drama directed by Richard Stanton and starring Lucy Fox. It was produced and distributed by William Fox.

== Cast ==
- Lucy Fox - Adele Moore
- Edward Sedgwick - ?unknown role
- William B. Davidson - unknown role
