= Speed (serial) =

1922 film

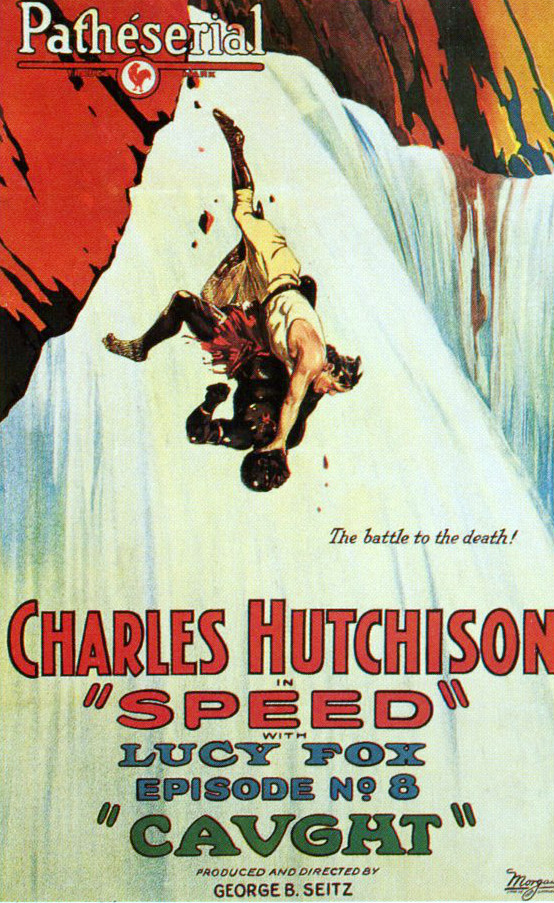
- Film poster
- Directed by: George B. Seitz
- Written by: Charles Hutchison; Bertram Millhauser
- Produced by: George B. Seitz
- Starring: Charles Hutchison; Lucy Fox
- Release date: October 22, 1922
- Running time: 15 episodes
- Country: United States
- Language: Silent (English intertitles)

Speed is a 1922 American action film serial directed by George B. Seitz. The story is a typically convoluted serial plot. Speed Stansbury is heir to a large fortune. A master criminal hires someone to frame Speed for murder and bank robbery. As Speed pursues the man who can prove his innocence to South America, he himself is followed by Lucy, the woman he loves.

== Cast ==
- Charles Hutchison as Speed Stansbury
- Lucy Fox as Lucy Durant
- John Webb Dillion as Edwin Stansbury
- Harry Semels as Jim Sprague
- Cecile Bonnel as Vera Harper
- Winifred Verina as Mrs. Sprague
- Joe Cuny as Hagerty
- Tom Goodwin as J.J. Stansbury
- Charles 'Patch' Revada as Pious Pedro
- R. Henry Grey

== Chapter titles ==
1. The Getaway
2. Nerve
3. Pious Pedro
4. The Quagmire
5. Fighting Mad
6. Panic
7. Jaws of Danger
8. Caught
9. Hit or Miss
10. Buried Alive
11. Into the Crusher
12. Trimmed
13. Risky Business
14. The Peril Rider
15. Found Guilty

== See also ==
- List of film serials
- List of film serials by studio

== Notes ==
Rainey, Buck, Serials and Series, a World Filmography, 1912-1956, 1999, McFarland & Co., Inc. Lahue, Kalton C., Continued Next Week, A History of the Moving Picture Serial, 1964, University of Oklahoma Press
