= Mutual Film =

American film conglomerate

Mutual Film Corporation
- Industry: Film studio
- Predecessor: Western Film Exchange
- Founded: March 1912
- Defunct: December 31, 1918
- Fate: Dissolved
- Headquarters: Edendale, California
- Key people: John R. Freuler (1872–1958); Harry E. Aitken (1877–1956); Roy Aitken (1882–1976)
- Subsidiaries: Keystone Studios; Majestic Studios/Reliance-Majestic Studios; New York Motion Picture Company (and its subsidiaries: Kay Bee Studios, 101-Bison Company, Broncho Film Company, and Domino Film Company); Signal Film Corporation; Vogue Films, Inc. Lone Star Film Company; American Film Company

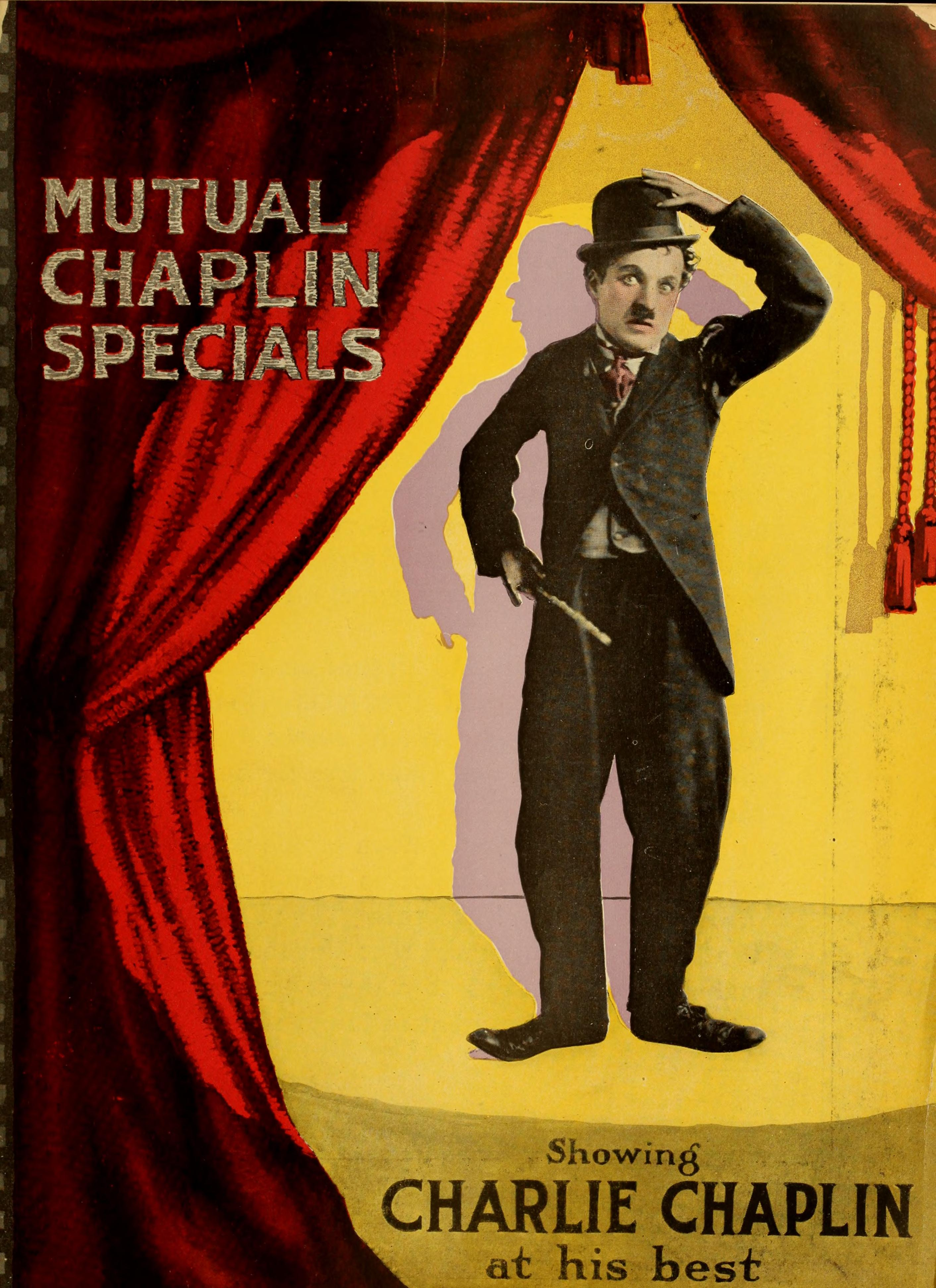
Advertisement (1916)

Mutual Film Corporation was an early American film conglomerate that produced some of Charlie Chaplin's greatest comedies. Founded in 1912, it was absorbed by Film Booking Offices of America, which evolved into RKO Pictures.

== Founding ==
Mutual's predecessor film businesses began with the partnership behind the Western Film Exchange, founded in Milwaukee, Wisconsin, in July 1906. The partnership included Harry E. Aitken, Roy Aitken, and John R. Freuler. In 1910, Freuler also formed a partnership with Chicago film distributor Samuel S. Hutchinson, establishing a production entity known as the American Film Manufacturing Company.

In early 1912 the Shallenberger brothers (Wilbert E. and William Edgar), Crawford Livingston, and others as investors including Charles J. Hite, the President & CEO of Thanhouser Film Corporation, joined Freuler and Harry E. Aitken in the formation of Mutual Film. Mutual Film Corporation was formed in 1912 by a group of American businessmen including Harry E. Aitken.

A releasing and distribution company, Mutual also had numerous subsidiary production units, including Keystone Studios, famed producer of comedies. Mutual is celebrated for signing Charlie Chaplin in 1916; he produced some of his best comedies while working for the company., although he felt that the company's tight production schedules led to the films becoming increasingly formulaic. As a result of this concern, Chaplin went with First National Pictures to have a contract that allowed him more flexibile production schedules so he could focus on making better films.

As 1912 progressed, the company included auxiliary units such as Keystone Studios, the Majestic Studios (which would later become the Reliance-Majestic Studios through Harry Aitken's partnership with D. W. Griffith), and the New York Motion Picture Company.

In 1915, the workers of Keystone Studios, Kay-Bee Studios (a subsidiary of the New York Motion Picture Company) and Reliance-Majestic Studio left Mutual, along with the Aitken brothers, to form the Triangle Film Corporation. Now as complete owners of the former Reliance-Majestic Studio, by 1917 the conglomerate operated as the distributor for four subsidiary studios in California, three of which were in the Los Angeles area and the other in Santa Barbara. They were Signal Film Corporation, Vogue Films, Inc., Lone Star Film Company and American Film Company. Vogue Films, Inc. operated a studio at Santa Monica Boulevard and Gower street in Los Angeles producing two-reel comedy films exclusively. Among the other subsidiaries of the New York Motion Picture Company were: 101-Bison Company, Broncho Film Company, & Domino Film Company.

=== Legal cases ===
In 1915, the United States Supreme Court ruled in Mutual Film Corporation v. Industrial Commission of Ohio that motion pictures were a form of business, not an art form, and therefore not covered by the First Amendment. Shortly after this decision, cities began to pass ordinances banning the public exhibition of "immoral" films, concerning the major studios that state or federal regulations would soon follow. This ruling remained in effect until Joseph Burstyn, Inc v. Wilson in 1952 which declared that film was a legitimate artistic medium with free speech protections.

== Productions ==
In 1916, Charlie Chaplin became the highest paid entertainer in the world when he signed a contract with Mutual for a salary of $670,000 per year. Mutual built Chaplin his very own studio and allowed him total freedom to make twelve two-reel films during this fruitful twelve-month period. Chaplin subsequently recognised this period of film-making as the most inventive and liberating of his career, although he also had concerns that the films produced were increasingly formulaic during the length of his contract.

During 1916 and 1917, the Lone Star Film Company had Charlie Chaplin working at their studio at 1025 Lillian Way, in Hollywood. Charlie Chaplin moved on to found United Artists in 1919 with Mary Pickford, D. W. Griffith, and Douglas Fairbanks. In 1918, Mutual Film Corporation ceased production. Like many other companies established at this time, Mutual was eventually absorbed by larger corporations, in this case Film Booking Offices of America and later RKO Radio Pictures.

With the exception of the Chaplin films, most of the Mutual shorts and feature dramas are lost to time and decomposition.

== Selected filmography ==
A Little Hero (1913), silent animal movie with Mabel Normand with Dutch language intertitles. Collection EYE Film Institute Netherlands.

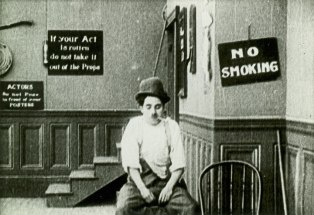
Charlie Chaplin in The Property Man (1914)

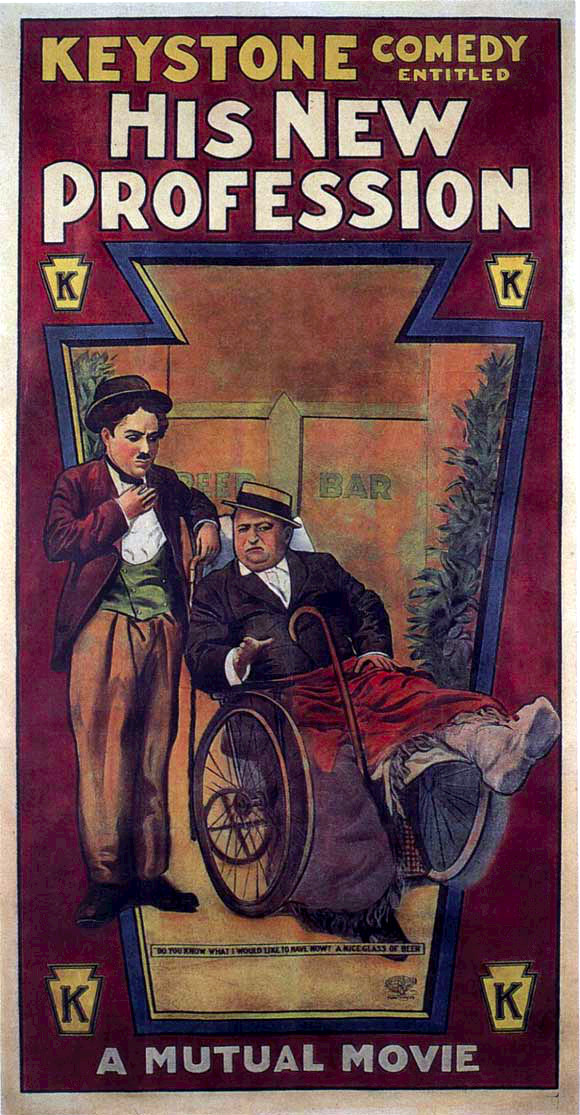
Poster for His New Profession (1914)

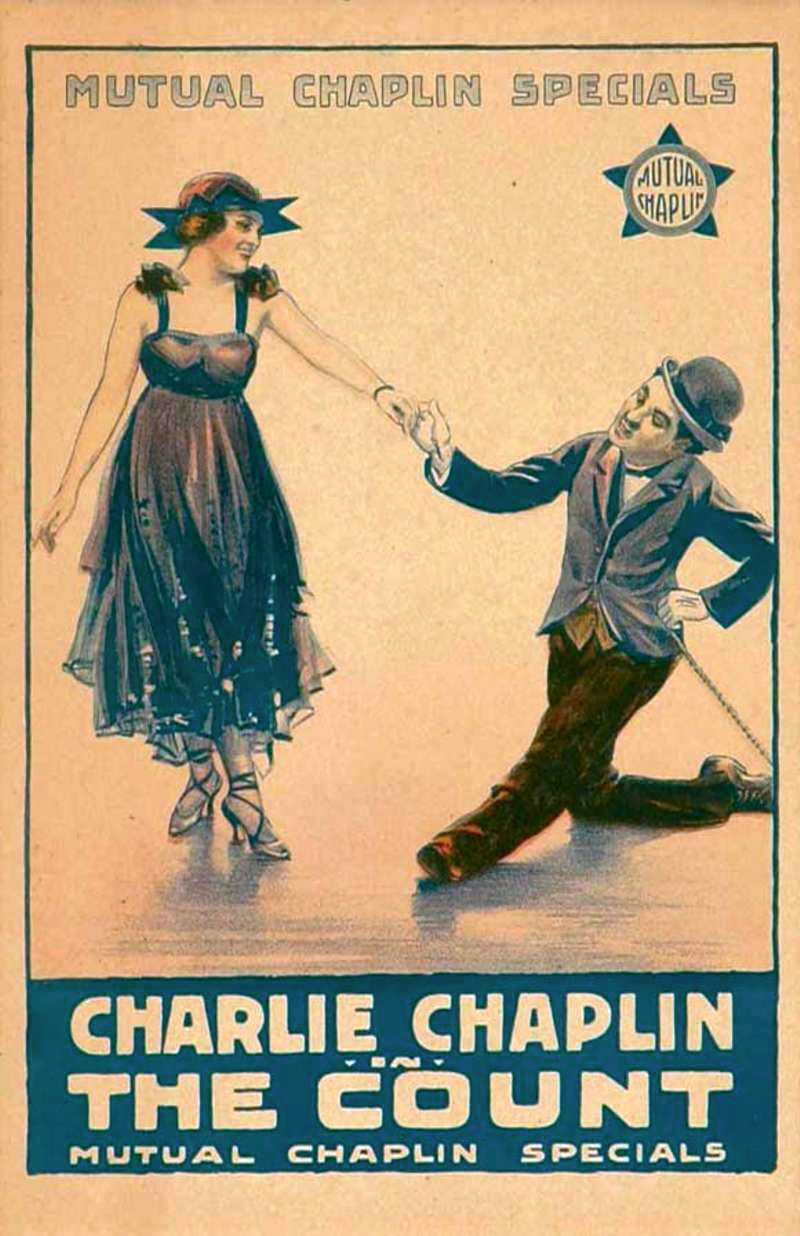
Poster for The Count (1915)

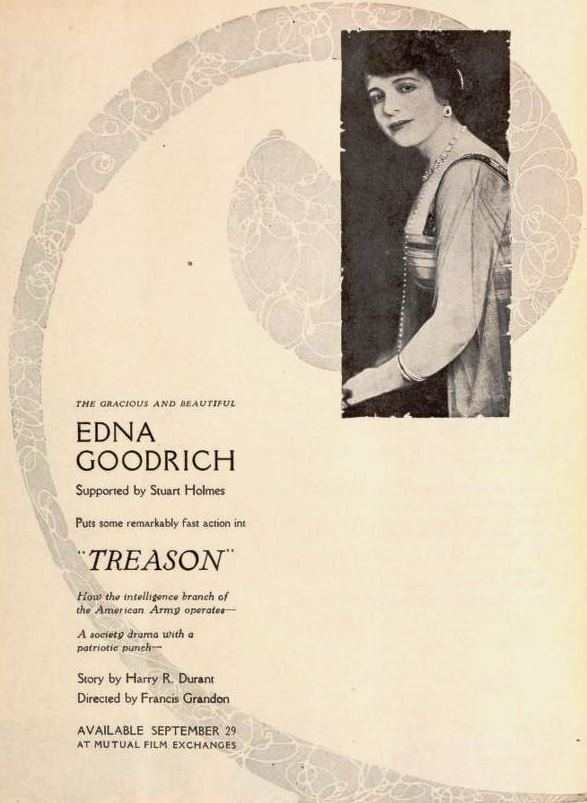
Ad for Treason (1918)

Year	Title	Notes
1913	A Little Hero	
1913	The Grand Military Parade	
1913	An Accidental Clue	
1914	The Cocoon and the Butterfly	
1914	Our Mutual Girl	
1914	The Life of General Villa	
1914	The Property Man	
1914	The Face on the Bar Room Floor	
1914	His New Profession	
1914	Sweet and Low	
1914	Fatty's Wine Party	
1914	Leading Lizzie Astray	
1915	The Devil	
1915	The Failure	
1915	Father and Son	
1915	The Count	
1915	The Straw Man	
1915	The Deathlock	
1916	Fighting the War	
1916	The Other Side of the Door	
1916	Johnny's Romeo	
1916	Father and Son	
1916	The Folly of Fear	
1916	At Twelve O'Clock	
1916	The Turn of the Wheel	
1916	The False Clue	
1916	Within the Lines	
1916	His Guardian Angel	
1916	When the Tide Turned	
1916	Grouchy	
1916	His Uncle's Ward	
1916	Admirers Three	
1916	Uncle Sam's Defenders	
1916	The Pawnshop	
1917	Pardners	
1917	Rehabilitated	
1917	Queen X	
1917	The Greater Woman	
1917	The Wildcat	
1917	Mary Moreland	
1917	Bab the Fixer	
1917	The Beautiful Adventure	
1917	Please Help Emily	
1917	The Sea Master	
1917	The Serpent's Tooth	
1917	Souls in Pawn	
1917	The Girl Who Can Cook	
1917	The Girl from Rector's	
1917	The Railroad Raiders	
1917	A Daughter of Maryland	
1917	American Maid	
1917	Her Second Husband	
1918	Who Loved Him Best?	
1918	Her Husband's Honor	
1918	My Wife	
1918	Treason	
