= Edna Goodrich =

American actress (1883–1971)

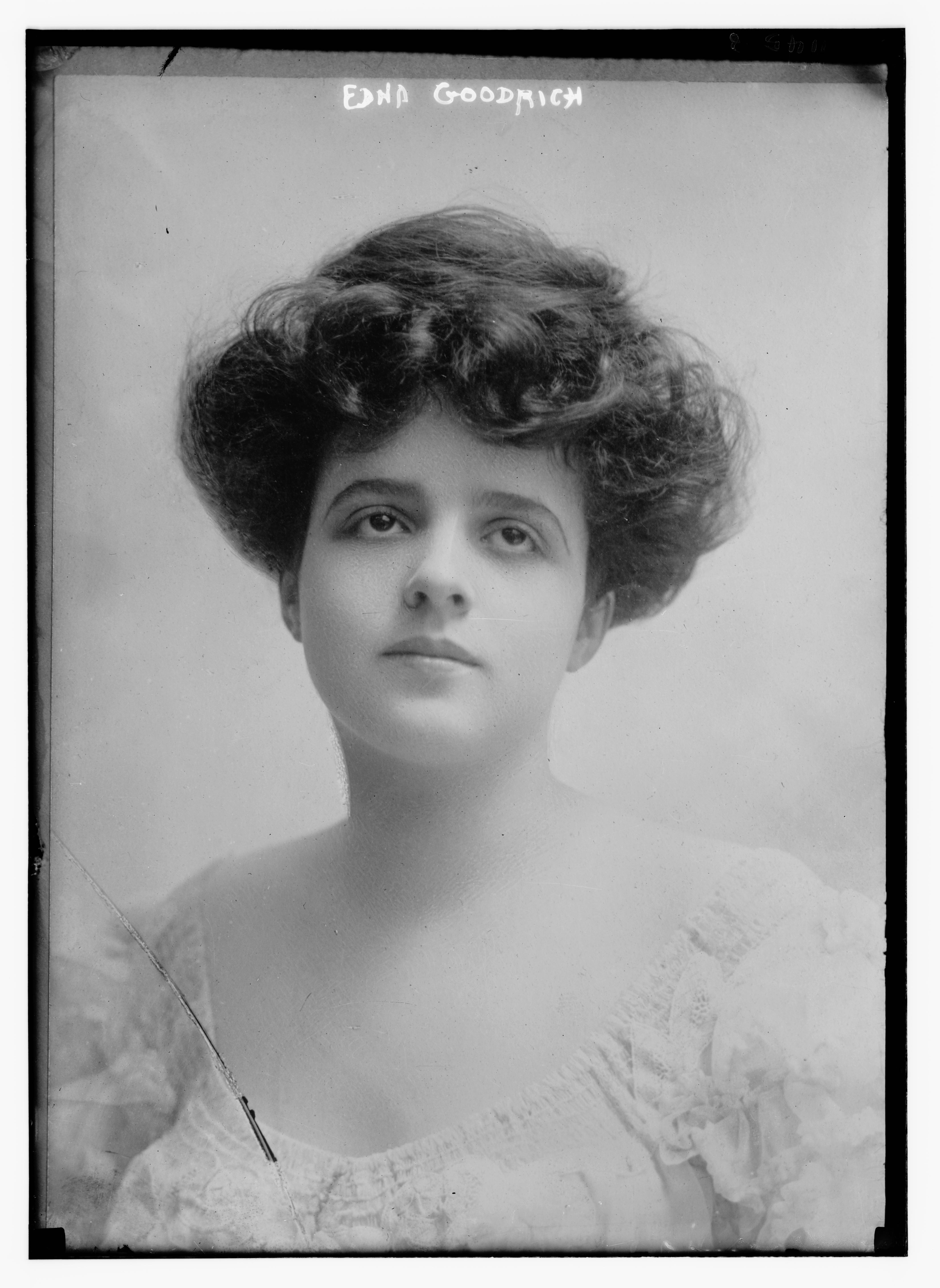
- Born: Bessie Edna Stevens; December 22, 1883; Logansport, Indiana, U.S.
- Died: May 26, 1971 (aged 87); New York City, U.S.
- Occupation: Actress
- Years active: 1903–1918
- Spouses: Edwin Stacey; Nat C. Goodwin (m. 1908; div. 1911)

Edna Goodrich (born Bessie Edna Stevens; December 22, 1883 – May 26, 1971) was an American Broadway actress, Florodora girl, author, and media sensation during the early 1900s. At one point, she was known as one of America's wealthiest and best dressed performers. She was married to Edwin Stacey of Cincinnati, Ohio, and later Nat C. Goodwin.

== Family ==
The daughter of Nellie Goodrich and A.S. Stevens, Edna was raised by her great-grandfather, Abner Scott Thornton, a member of the influential Logansport Thorntons. His brothers included William Patton Thornton, a noted physician; Henry Clay Thornton, a prominent lawyer and father of Sir Henry Worth Thornton; and Joseph Lyle Thornton, a respected educator and manufacturer. Judge William Wheeler Thornton was his nephew. Among his influential cousins were Military Reconstruction Judge James Johnston Thornton and Hon. Samuel W. Thornton, a member of the 1887 Nebraska State Legislature.

Her grandfather, Justus Goodrich, died in an insane asylum in Kankakee, Illinois on June 3, 1896. He long suffered from mental illness, derived from sunstroke received on the march to the Battle of Gettysburg. During the battle, on July 2, 1863, he was shot in the heel.

== Early career ==
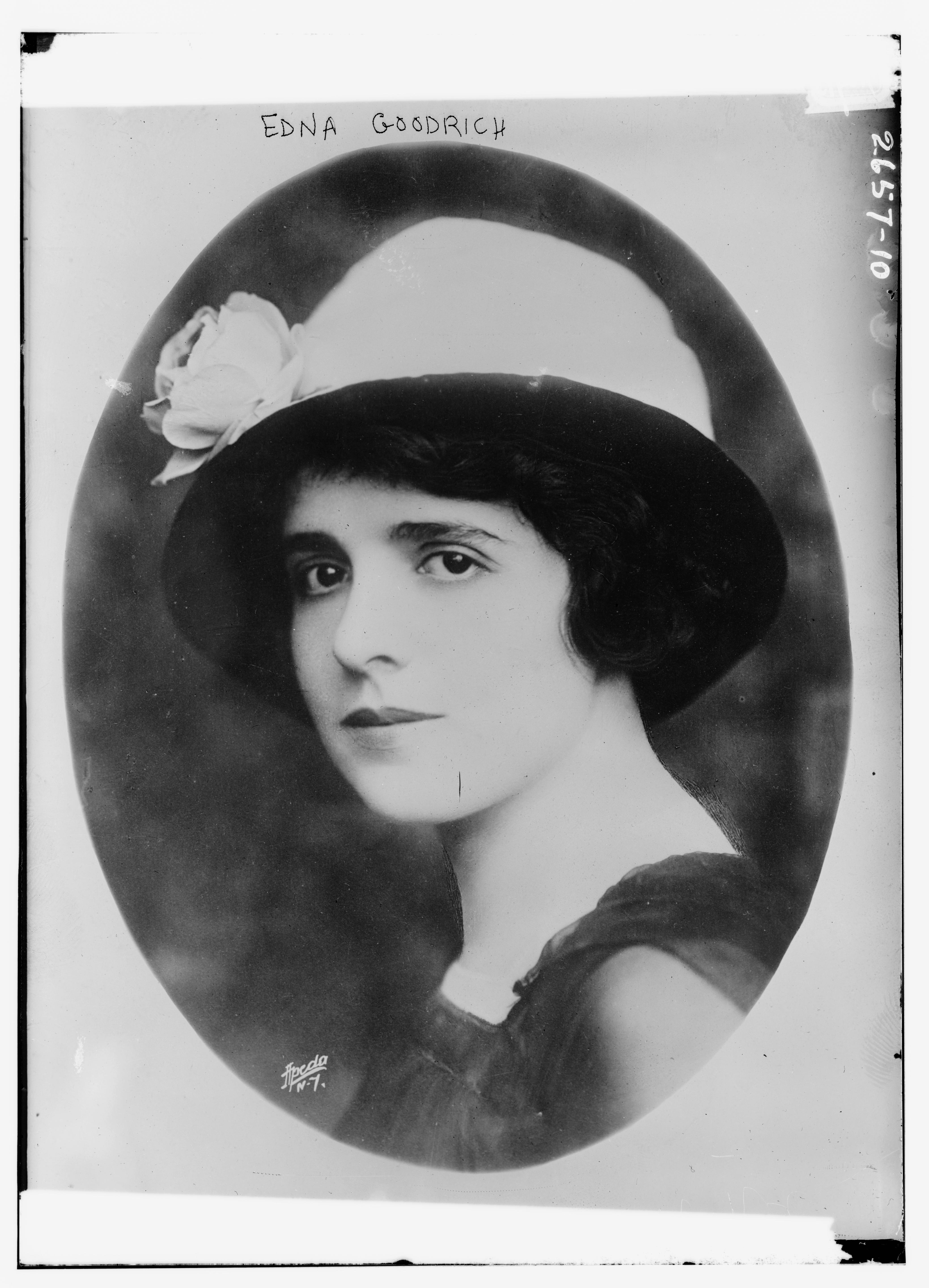
Edna Goodrich

Upon reaching adulthood, Edna and her mother moved to New York City, where both found work as chorus girls. Edna Goodrich joined the cast of the Florodora musical, as one of the famed sextets, all of whom were extremely beautiful, 5'4", and 130 lbs. Out of more than 70 women who became a Florodora girl, Edna was one of a handful who achieved lasting fame.

It was as a sextet that Edna Goodrich became involved in the Harry Kendall Thaw murder trial, which was labeled Trial of the Century by William Randolph Hearst's newspapers. Thaw killed architect Stanford White during a performance at Madison Square Garden over Mr. White's relationship to Evelyn Nesbit. It was reported that Edna Goodrich had introduced fellow Florodora chorus girl Nesbit and White during an intimate meeting in White's apartment. Edna Goodrich was served with several subpoenas during the trial, reportedly tearing one apart in front of the serving agent. She denied any knowledge of the affair.

== 1905–1910 ==
After leaving Florodora, Edna Goodrich became the leading lady of the Nat C. Goodwin comedic productions. Mr. Goodwin was the most famous American comedian of his era and scion of a mining family that had made millions. Their performances played to packed theaters across the United States and Europe, making both fodder for early news sensationalism.

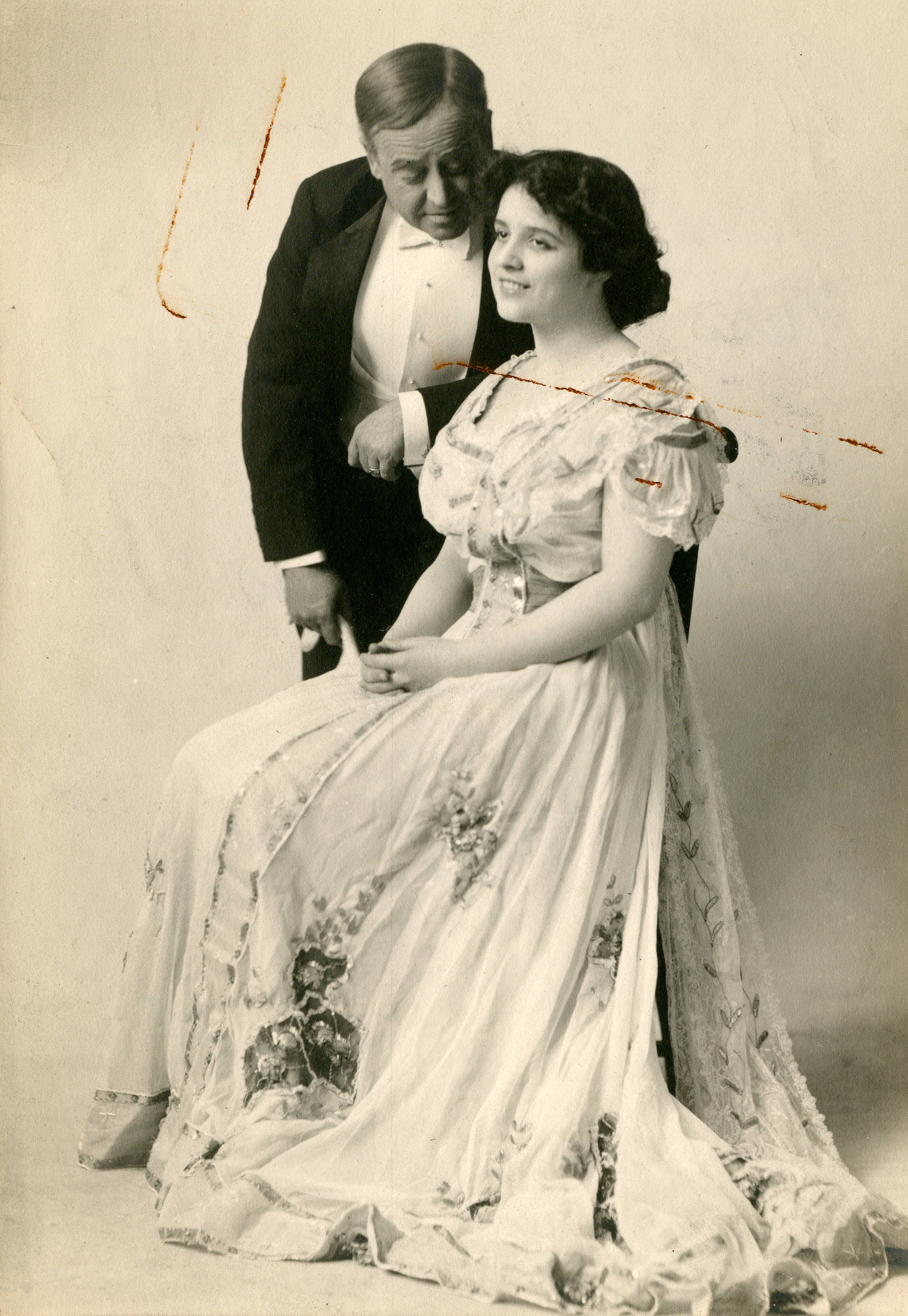
Nat Goodwin and Edna Goodrich in The Genius, 1907

In 1908 Goodrich and Goodwin became involved in a confusing sequence of events and news reports that would lead to their marriage. First, the press linked Edna with millionaire James H. McMillan; however, as the marriage date was continuously postponed, rumors began to circulate of discord. Edna affirmed the engagement and then took off for Europe on a $20,000 spending spree. Afraid of losing Edna, Nat Goodwin sailed to Europe to convince her that Mr. McMillan was actually poor. He hired private investigators to tail Ms. Goodrich; she hired private investigators to stay one step ahead of his investigators. This chase across Europe so unsettled Mr. McMillan that he asked Edna if she would not rather marry immediately in Switzerland. She said that she wanted to marry in her own country and set sail for the United States with her purchases. Surprisingly, within short order, the wedding was called off - the press attributed this change to Mr. McMillan's mother who had refused her consent after hearing of Edna Goodrich's involvement in the divorce of Nat Goodwin from his third wife, Maxine Elliott. The press later reported that Ms. Elliot became engaged to Mr. McMillan.

In the fall of 1908, Nat C. Goodwin and Edna Goodrich were married. The bride reportedly wore more than $60,000 worth of jewelry. Also, Nat and Edna signed a prenuptial agreement, entitling her to half of his estate and an income for life. At first, the press believed the amount conferred to be $400,000, but later, during divorce proceedings, it was revealed that the amount totaled more than $1.7 million.

== 1911–1920 ==
By the summer of 1910, the press began to circulate rumors of the Goodwins' impending separation amid rumors over Nat Goodwin's flirtation with another actress. This began a two-year press and court battle over the terms of the prenuptial trust, with both Goodrich and Goodwin filing repeated suits against one another. The official divorce was granted in New York, with the judge allowing Ms. Goodrich to once again use her maiden name and barring Mr. Goodwin from ever marrying in the state again.

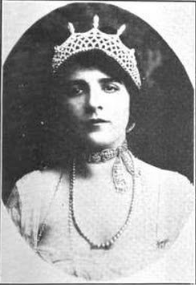
Edna Goodrich (1916)

From 1914 to August 1915, Edna Goodrich served as a nurse of World War I wounded for the British Army. Her cottage was later turned into a convalescent home for soldiers returning from the front. Her mother's cousin, Sir Henry Worth Thornton, was the highest ranking American-born officer in the British Army.

For the rest of the decade, Edna worked in theater and appeared in several movies of the Silent Screen, although she never captured the same degree of success as she enjoyed on stage. Also, she reportedly developed an alcohol addiction that caused her to be fired on the set of The Golden Chance (1915) by Cecil B. DeMille.

Edna Goodrich retired from making films in 1918.

== Theater and movie productions ==
=== Movies ===
- Armstrong's Wife (1915) as May Fielding
- The Making of Maddalena (1916) as Maddalena (*survives; Library of Congress)
- The House of Lies (1916) as Edna Coleman (*survives; Library of Congress)
- Queen X (1917) as Janice Waltham, Queen X (*survives; Library of Congress)
- Reputation (1917) as Constance Bennett
- A Daughter of Maryland (1917) as Beth Treadway
- American Maid (1917) as Virginia Lee
- Her Second Husband (1917) as Helen Kirby
- Who Loved Him Best? (1918) as Doria Dane (a.k.a. His Inspiration)
- Her Husband's Honor (1918) as Nancy Page
- Treason (1918) .... The Wife

=== Gallery ===
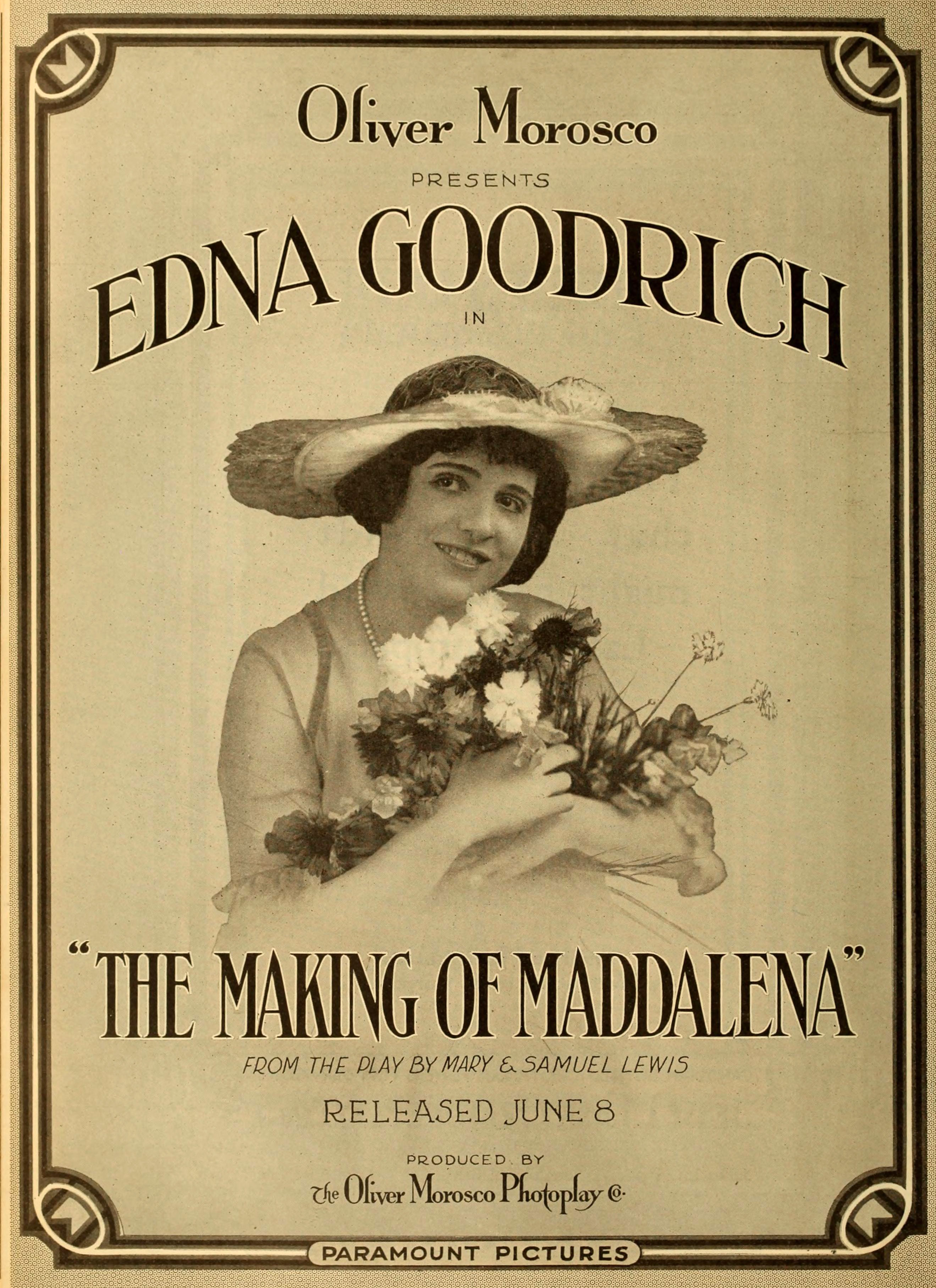
The Making of Maddalena (1916)

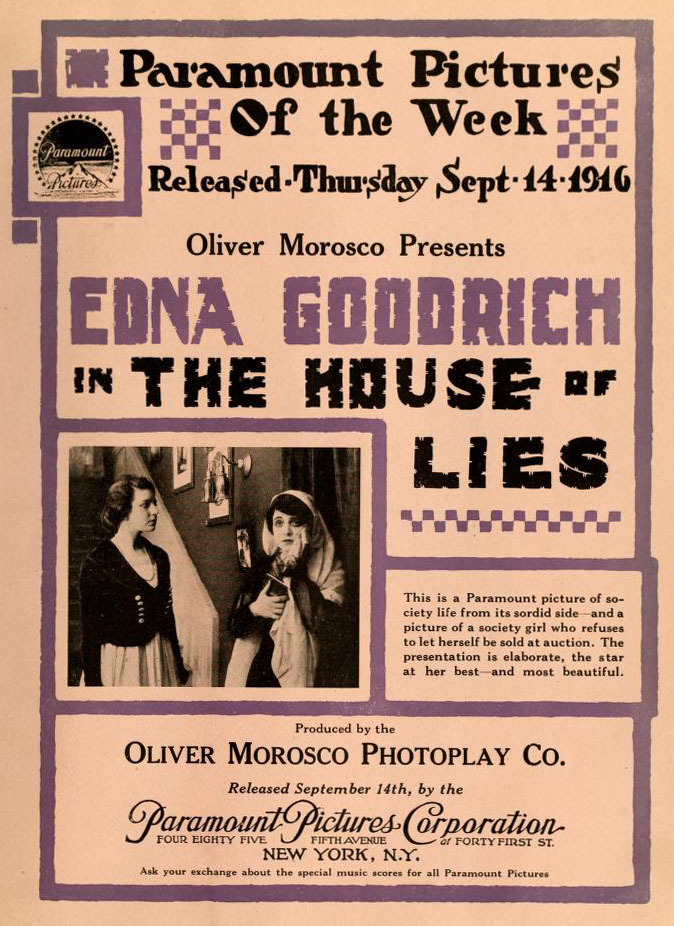
The House of Lies (1916)

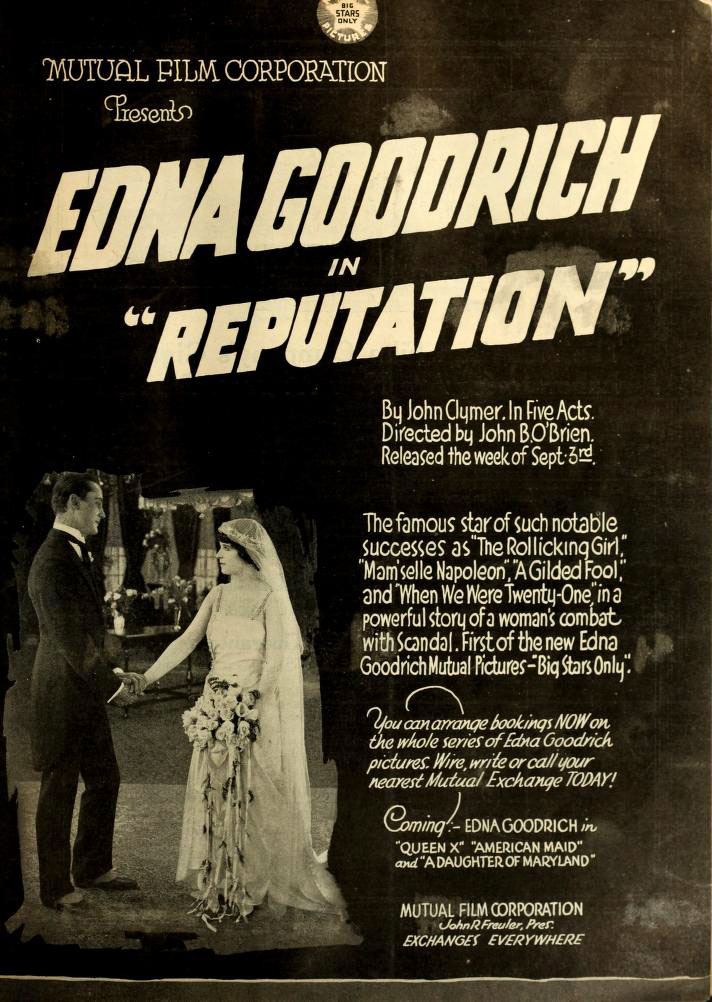
Reputation (1917)

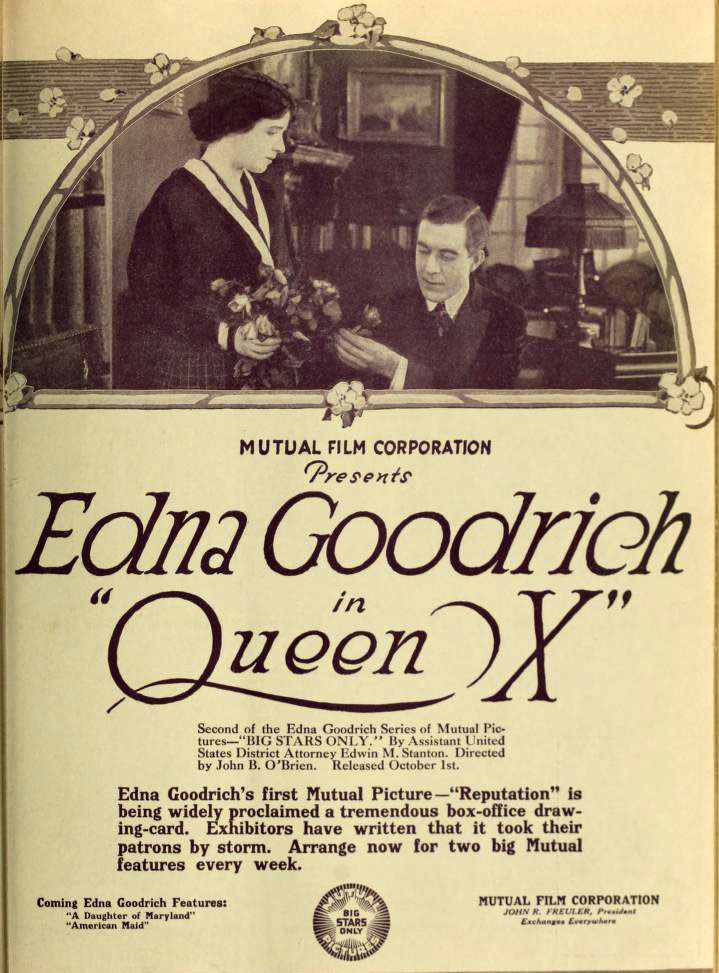
Queen X (1917)

=== Theater ===
Broadway:

- The Runaways 1903
- Mam'selle Napoleon 1903–1904
- A Jolly Baron 1905
- The Genius and the Model 1905
- The Rollicking Girl 1905–1906
- The Genius 1906
- The Easterner 1908
- Sleeping Partners 1918–1919

=== Producer ===
- The Genius and the Model 1905

=== Other prominent productions ===
- Florodora 1900–1904
- When we were Twenty-One 1906
- Evangeline 1913–1914
- The Mannequin 1919
- Shadows 1920

=== Author ===
- Deynard's Divorce (1912)
