= Sol Polito =

Italian-American cinematographer (1892–1960)

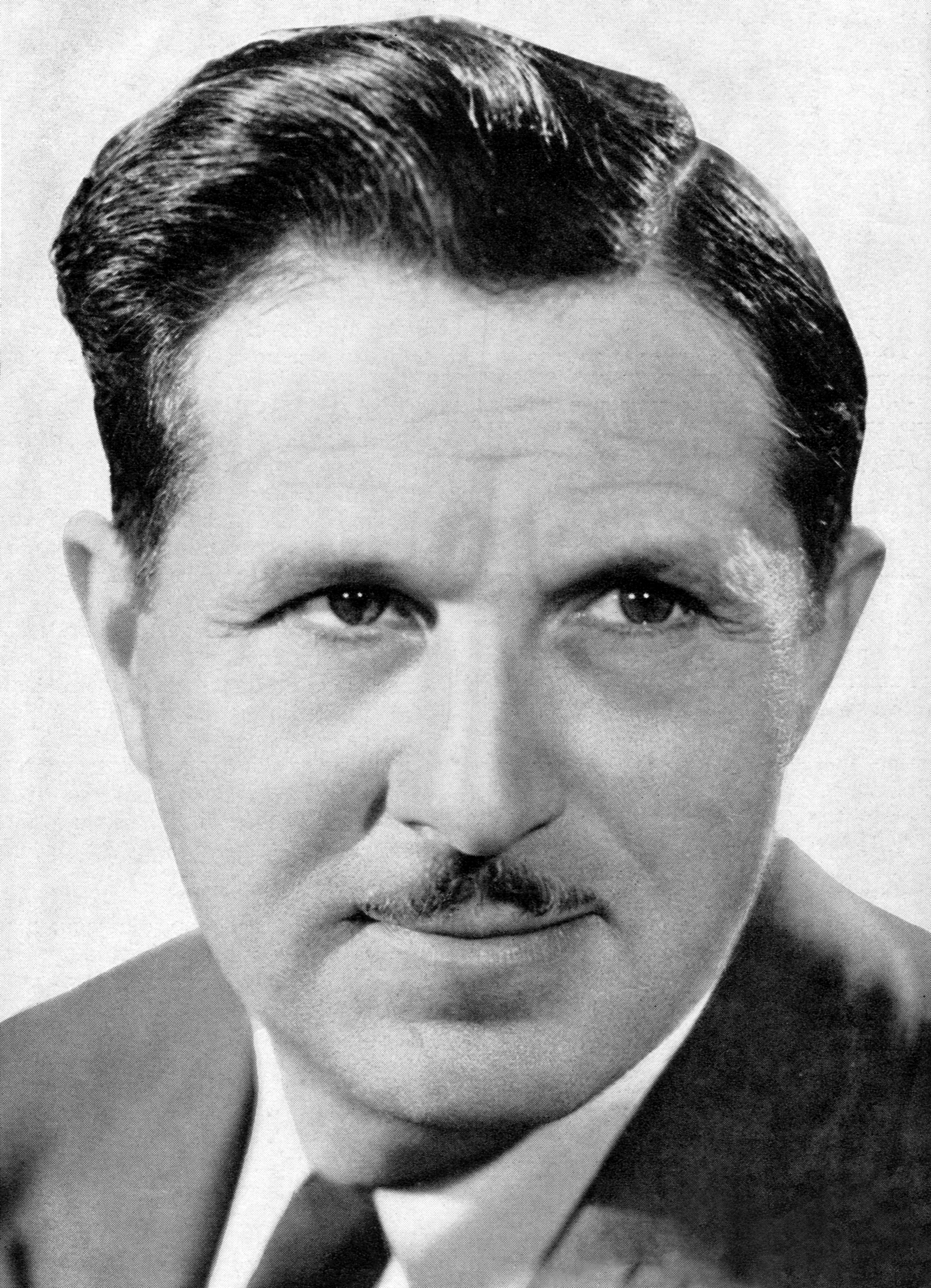
- Sol Polito in 1942
- Born: Salvatore Polito; November 12, 1892; Palermo, Italy
- Died: May 23, 1960 (aged 67); Los Angeles, California
- Occupation: Cinematographer
- Years active: 1914–1949
- Spouse: Frances D'Angelis
- Children: 2
- Relatives: Gene Polito (son)

Sol Polito ASC (born Salvatore Polito, November 12, 1892 – May 23, 1960) was a Sicilian-American cinematographer. He is best known for his work with directors Michael Curtiz and Mervyn LeRoy at Warner Bros. studios in the 1930s and 1940s.

== Biography ==
Salvatore Polito was born November 12, 1892, in Palermo, Italy, and immigrated to the United States in 1905. He attended school in New York City and began working in the motion picture industry as a still photographer. After experience as a lab assistant and camera assistant, he was promoted to lighting cameraman in 1917.

Polito married Frances (Francesca) D'Angelis in New York in 1914. The union produced two sons. The elder son Gene Polito (1918-2010) also became a cinematographer. Younger son S. Robert Polito (1922–2015) became a physician.

Polito moved from Brooklyn to Los Angeles in 1919 to continue his career at First National Pictures and Warner Bros. He worked on more than 170 films at various studios, but is best known for his work at Warner Bros. with directors Michael Curtiz and Mervyn LeRoy.

Polito died in Los Angeles on May 23, 1960, aged 67, and was entombed in the Mausoleum at Calvary Cemetery in East Los Angeles, California.

== Accolades ==
Polito received three Academy Award nominations:

- 1939: The Private Lives of Elizabeth and Essex, Best Cinematography (Color), shared with W. Howard Greene
- 1941: Sergeant York, Best Cinematography (Black and White)
- 1942: Captains of the Clouds, Best Cinematography (Color)

== Select filmography ==
Año	Título	Director	Notes
1914	Rip Van Winkle		
1915	The Butterfly	Oscar A. C. Lund	
1915	A Butterfly on the Wheel	Maurice Tourneur	
1915	The Cotton King	Oscar Eagle	
1916	Paying the Price	Frank Hall Crane	
1917	The Runaway	Dell Henderson	
1918	Treason	Burton L. King	
1919	Burglar by Proxy	John Francis Dillon	
1920	The Misleading Lady	George Irving; George W. Terwilliger	
1923	The Bad Man	Edwin Carewe	
1928	The Haunted House	Benjamin Christensen	
1929	Scarlet Seas	John Francis Dillon	
1930	No, No, Nanette	Clarence G. Badger	
1931	Five Star Final	Mervyn LeRoy	
1932	Two Seconds	Mervyn LeRoy	
1932	I Am a Fugitive from a Chain Gang	Mervyn LeRoy	
1932	Three on a Match	Mervyn LeRoy	
1933	Gold Diggers of 1933	Mervyn LeRoy	
1933	42nd Street	Lloyd Bacon	
1934	Dr. Monica	William Keighley	
1934	Dames	Ray Enright	
1934	Flirtation Walk	Frank Borzage	
1935	G Men	William Keighley	
1936	The Petrified Forest	Archie Mayo	
1937	The Prince and the Pauper	William Keighley	
1938	The Adventures of Robin Hood	Michael Curtiz	
1938	Angels with Dirty Faces	Michael Curtiz	
1939	The Private Lives of Elizabeth and Essex	Michael Curtiz	Nominee (with W. Howard Greene), Academy Award for Best Cinematography (Color)
1939	Dodge City	Michael Curtiz	
1939	Four Wives	Michael Curtiz	
1940	Virginia City	Michael Curtiz	
1940	The Sea Hawk	Michael Curtiz	
1940	Santa Fe Trail	Michael Curtiz	
1941	The Sea Wolf	Michael Curtiz	
1941	Sergeant York	Howard Hawks	Nominee, Academy Award for Best Cinematography (Black and White)
1942	Captains of the Clouds	Michael Curtiz	Nominee, Academy Award for Best Cinematography (Color)
1942	Now, Voyager	Irving Rapper	
1943	This Is the Army	Michael Curtiz	
1944	Arsenic and Old Lace	Frank Capra	
1944	The Adventures of Mark Twain	Irving Rapper	
1945	The Corn Is Green	Irving Rapper	
1947	The Long Night	Anatole Litvak	
1948	Sorry, Wrong Number	Anatole Litvak	
1948	The Voice of the Turtle	Irving Rapper	
1949	Anna Lucasta	Irving Rapper	
