= Ace of Clubs (film) =

1925 film

- Directed by: J.P. McGowan
- Written by: George Arthur Durlam
- Produced by: Morris R. Schlank
- Starring: Al Hoxie; Peggy Montgomery; Jules Cowles
- Cinematography: Robert E. Cline
- Edited by: Thelma Smith
- Production company: Morris R. Schlank Productions
- Distributed by: Anchor Film Distributors; Rayart Pictures
- Release date: July 1925
- Running time: 63 minutes
- Country: United States
- Languages: Silent; English intertitles

Ace of Clubs is a 1925 American silent Western film directed by J.P. McGowan and starring Al Hoxie, Peggy Montgomery and Jules Cowles.

== Plot summary ==
Jack Horton's father and brother have been murdered. Horton is searching for the killer, with his only clue being the Ace of Clubs he found pinned to their bodies.

Upon visiting McGill's newly arrived niece, Jack finds two decks of cards in which the club aces are missing. Having been spotted by McGill's men who were rustling the Horton cattle, he apparently becomes the next victim when a club ace is placed on his unconscious body.

== Cast ==
- Al Hoxie as Jack Horton
- Peggy Montgomery as June McGill - Sandy's Niece
- Andrew Waldron as Sandy McGill
- Minna Redman as The Widow Horton
- Jules Cowles as Jake McGill
- Mutt as Mutt - the Dog
- Frank Ellis as Horton Cowhand
- Slim Whitaker as Horton Cowhand

== Release ==
Although some sources date the release of this film as 1925, The American Film Institute Catalog of Motion Pictures Produced in the United States dates it as 1926.

== Critical reception ==
According to A Guide to Silent Westerns, several film historians consider Ace of Clubs to be poorly written, miscast, and one of the worst westerns ever made.

== See also ==
- List of American films of 1925
