= Ubangi =

Ubangi (also spelled Ubangui, Ubanghi, or Oubangui) may refer to:

== Places ==
- Ubangi Province (1962−1966), in the north of Zaire,
  - now Nord-Ubangi and Sud-Ubangi provinces of the Democratic Republic of the Congo
- Ubangi River, tributary of the Congo River in Africa
- Ubangi-Shari, a French colony which became the Central African Republic
- Apostolic Vicariate of Belgian Ubanghi, a former Catholic missionary (initially an Apostolic Prefecture)

== Other uses ==
- Ubangian languages, a family of Central African languages
- An obsolescent term for African women with lip plates, see Lip plate#Ubangi misnomer
- Ubangi (film), a 1931 William M. Pizor film

== See also ==
- Ubangi Stomp
