= Riders of the Cactus =

1931 film

- Directed by: David Kirkland
- Written by: Charles Connell; David Kirkland
- Produced by: Robert Connell; R.B. Hooper
- Starring: Hal Taliaferro; Buzz Barton; Fred Church
- Cinematography: R.B. Hooper
- Edited by: Charles Connell
- Production company: Hooper-Connell Productions
- Distributed by: Big 4 Film
- Release date: July 7, 1931
- Running time: 60 minutes
- Country: United States
- Language: English

Riders of the Cactus is a 1931 American Western film directed by David Kirkland and starring Hal Taliaferro, Buzz Barton and Fred Church. Location shooting took place in Sonora, California, and near Tucson, Arizona at the Tanque Verde Ranch and Mission San Xavier del Bac Mission. The film was made back-to-back with Flying Lariats.

== Plot ==
Smugglers on the Mexico–United States border pursue the tourist Josie after they learn that she has a valuable map that shows the location of buried treasure. Bronson rescues her, catching and beating the villains. Agents from the U.S. Border Patrol take the villains away, and Bronson and Josie turn the treasure over to a mission church where they are married.

== Cast ==
- Hal Taliaferro as Bob Bronson
- Buzz Barton as Buzz
- Fred Church as Jake McKeever, alias Jake Wenzel
- Lorraine LaVal as Josie
- Ed Cartwright as Pete
- Don Wilson as Peon
- Joe Lawliss as Bill
- Tete Brady as Hattie McKeever
- Etta Delmas as Aunt Sarah Casey
- Gus Anderson as Ranger Captain
- Sam Garrett as Trick Roper / Ranger

== Bibliography ==
- Michael R. Pitts. Poverty Row Studios, 1929–1940: An Illustrated History of 55 Independent Film Companies, with a Filmography for Each. McFarland & Company, 2005.
