= Thelma Smith =

American film editor

- Occupation: Film editor
- Years active: 1925–1926

Thelma Smith was an American film editor active in Hollywood in the 1920s who worked with filmmaker J.P. McGowan at Morris R. Schlank Productions.

== Biography ==
Smith was working as a film editor in Hollywood by 1922; the first film we for sure know she worked on was 1924's A Woman Who Sinned. She didn't officially receive credits until a few years later, when she became a cutter for director J.P. McGowan.

== Selected filmography ==
- Crossed Signals (1926)
- Ace of Clubs (1925)
- Red Blood (1925)
- Riding for Life (1925)
- The Road Agent (1925)
- A Woman Who Sinned (1924)
