= Cliff Lyons (actor) =

American film actor (1901–1974)

- Born: Clifford William Lyons; July 1, 1901; Lake County, South Dakota, U.S.
- Died: January 6, 1974 (aged 72); Los Angeles, California, U.S.
- Occupations: Stuntman; Actor
- Years active: 1924–1973
- Spouse: Beth Marion (m. 1938; div. 1955)
- Children: 2

Clifford William Lyons (July 1, 1901 – January 6, 1974) was an American film actor, stuntman and second unit director, primarily of Westerns and particularly the films of John Ford and John Wayne. His Hollywood contemporaries were unanimous in describing him as "a driven taskmaster".

== Biography ==
Lyons, the son of Garrett Thomas Lyons and Wilhamena Johnson Lyons, was raised on a South Dakota farm, though his family lived for a time in Memphis, Tennessee, where he attended business school. An expert horseman, Lyons gave up the notion of a business career and opted for the rodeo arena instead, touring nationwide and eventually reaching Los Angeles at the age of 21. Accomplished cowboys were in great demand for western films, and Lyons found a home in that genre, working both as a stuntman and an actor.

After only a couple of bit parts, he was signed by independent producer Bud Barsky to do seven inexpensive Westerns directed by Paul Hurst, with costar Al Hoxie (the younger brother of cowboy actor Jack Hoxie). Lyons and Al Hoxie alternated as the hero and heavy in another Western series produced by Morris R. Schlank and, as Cliff "Tex" Lyons, he seemed headed for minor stardom as a "B" western lead. Throughout the late 1920s he also worked frequently in Ben F. Wilson productions around Inglewood, California.

Unfortunately, Lyons' voice was not well-suited for sound and the talkie revolution confined him to smaller roles. However, as his shot at stardom faded, his career as a stunt double for major actors was on the rise. Lyons doubled such cowboy stars as Tom Mix, Ken Maynard, Buck Jones and Johnny Mack Brown, often under the direction of Francis Ford, elder brother of John.

In 1936 he worked with John Wayne for the first time and began a personal and business relationship that would remain strong for three decades. Wayne was influential in getting Lyons his first work as a second-unit director and in introducing him to John Ford, for whom Lyons would do some of his finest action sequences. Lyons' reputation as a stunt coordinator is comparable to that of acknowledged master Yakima Canutt, with whom Lyons partnered on numerous occasions.

Film scholar J. Hoberman relates an incident from 1955 when Lyons and Canutt were involved in using their brawling reputation to break up a group of leftists who were reportedly targeting Wayne.

Lyons' most noted second unit work was the massive and dynamic battle sequences of Wayne's The Alamo. He specialized in mass horse falls (sometimes up to a dozen in a single scene), back-flip dismounts at gallop, and wagon and carriage separations and rollovers; all seen to good effect in The Comancheros for Michael Curtiz. Lyons was probably the last stuntman to ride a horse off a cliff for the movies before it was banned by animal humane laws.

In 1952 Lyons appeared as Willie in the western Bend in the River which starred Jimmy Stewart, Arthur Kennedy, Julie Adams and Rock Hudson. He is also seen briefly in the rollcall of the charioteers in the 1959 remake of Ben-Hur .

He was elected to the board of directors of the Screen Actors Guild and was an original board member of the Hollywood Stuntmans' Hall of Fame.

Although he gained notoriety for taking horses over high jumps and down steep hills, Wayne biographer Scott Eyman records Lyons always cared for the safety of men and animals under his charge and on one occasion worried whether cattle to be used in a stampede scene might break their legs by going over a small gully.

Lyons was married from 1938 to 1955 to actress Beth Marion, with whom he had two sons. He died in 1974 at 72, not long after coordinating stunts for Wayne's The Train Robbers.

== Selected filmography ==
- A Tale of the Christ (1925)
- Riding Romance (1925)
- Wild Horse Canyon (1925)
- Blue Streak O'Neil (1926)
- West of the Law (1926)
- Thunderbolt's Tracks (1927)
- Rider of the Law (1927)
- Speeding Hoofs (1927)
- Law of the Mounted (1928)
- Manhattan Cowboy (1928)
- West of Santa Fe (1928)
- Across the Plains (1928)
- The Old Code (1928)
- An Oklahoma Cowboy (1929)
- The Saddle King (1929)
- Captain Cowboy (1929)
- Headin' Westward (1929)
- Points West (1929)
- The Cowboy and the Outlaw (1929)
- West of the Rockies (1929)
- The Voice From the Sky (1930)
- Breezy Bill (1930)
- Call of the Desert (1930)
- The Canyon of Missing Men (1930)
- Code of Honor (1930)
- Firebrand Jordan (1930)
- The Lone Rider (1930)
- Red Fork Range (1931)
- Riders of the Purple Sage (1931)
- Battling Buckaroo (1932)
- Mystery Mountain (1934)
- Jesse James (1939) (horse river dive; ride through plateglass; horse to train transfer)
- Winners of the West (1940)
- The Purple Monster Strikes (1945)
- The Phantom Rider (1946)
- 3 Godfathers (1948) (uncredited)
- Wagon Master (1950)
- Bend of the River (1952)
- Peter Gunn (TV series, 1st season, episode 27, "Breakout") (1959)
