= The Arizona Sweepstakes =

1926 film

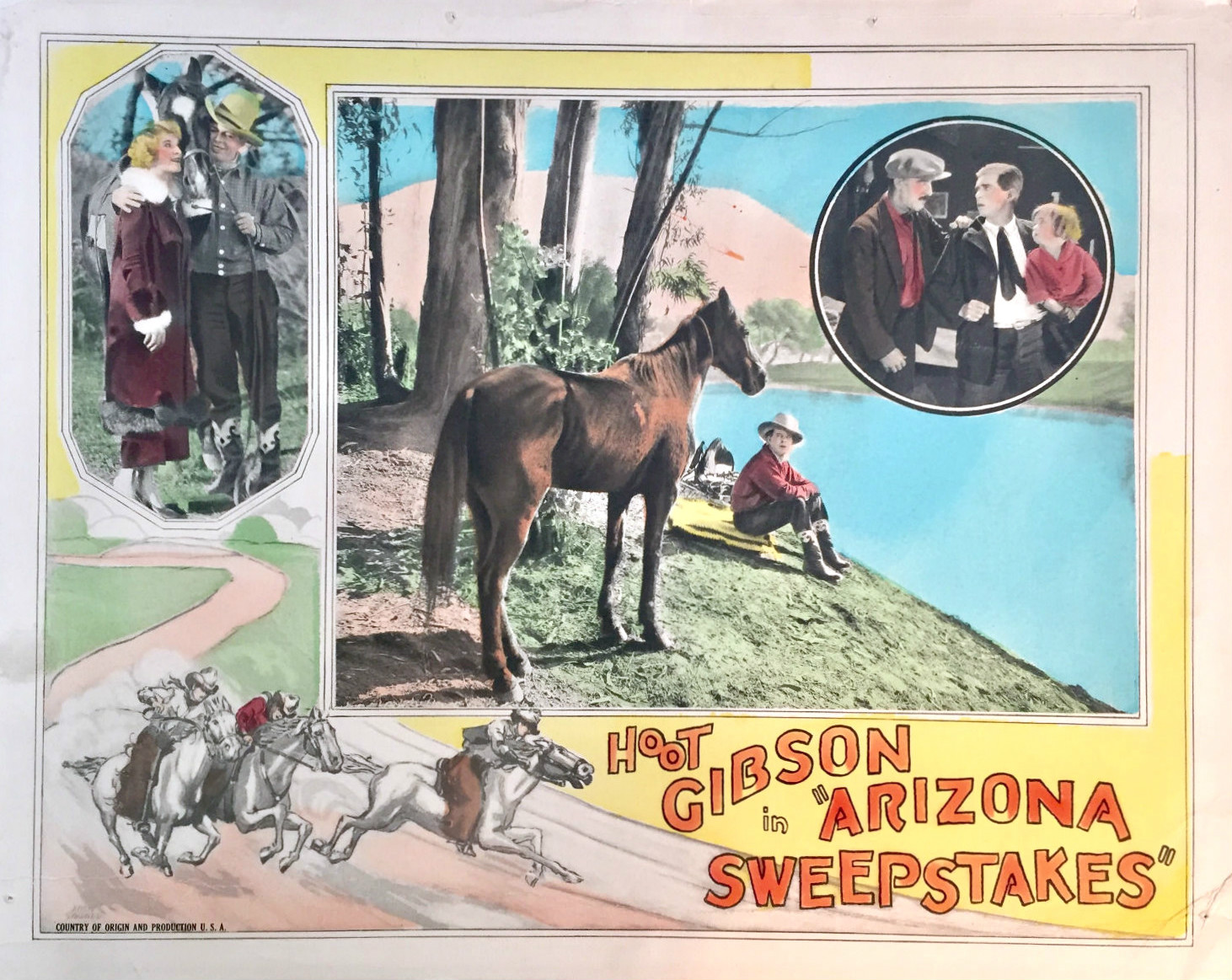
- Lobby card
- Directed by: Clifford Smith
- Written by: Isadore Bernstein
- Based on: a story by Charles Logue
- Produced by: Carl Laemmle
- Starring: Hoot Gibson
- Cinematography: Harry Neuman
- Distributed by: Universal Pictures
- Release date: January 10, 1926
- Running time: 6 reels
- Country: United States
- Language: Silent (English intertitles)

The Arizona Sweepstakes is a 1926 American silent Western film directed by Clifford Smith and starring Hoot Gibson. It was produced and distributed by Universal Pictures.

== Plot ==
As described in a film magazine review, the film follows a cowboy who goes to a city, becomes embroiled in several gang fights, and narrowly escapes prison after being falsely accused of manslaughter. He escapes and hurries home to enter a horse race on the outcome of which, he learns, depends the financial future of the man whose daughter he loves. A detective arrives to arrest him, but he evades capture and rides to victory in the race.

== Cast ==
- Hoot Gibson as Coot Cadigan
- Helen Lynch as Nell Savery
- Philo McCullough as Jonathan Carey
- George Ovey as Stuffy McGee
- Emmett King as Col. Tom Savery
- Tod Brown as Detective
- Kate Price as Mrs. McGuire
- Jack Morgan as McGee Child
- Billy Kent Schaefer as McGee Child
- Kingsley Benedict as Cowhand

== Preservation ==
With no prints of The Arizona Sweepstakes located in any film archives, it is a lost film.
