= The Canyon of Missing Men =

1930 film directed by J. P. McGowan

- Directed by: J. P. McGowan
- Written by: George H. Williams; Sally Winters
- Produced by: George Arthur Durlam
- Starring: Tom Tyler; Sheila Bromley; Bud Osborne
- Cinematography: Hap Depew
- Edited by: Arthur A. Brooks
- Production company: G. A. Durlam Productions
- Distributed by: Syndicate Film Exchange
- Release date: June 1, 1930
- Running time: 50 minutes
- Country: United States
- Languages: Silent; English intertitles

The Canyon of Missing Men is a 1930 American silent Western film directed by J. P. McGowan and starring Tom Tyler, Sheila Bromley and Bud Osborne. Some versions of the film were released with added sound effects.

== Synopsis ==
Dave Brandon attempts to go straight after meeting Inez Sepulveda, the attractive daughter of a ranch owner, but the members of his former gang refuse to allow him to leave.

== Cast ==
- Tom Tyler as Dave Brandon
- Sheila Bromley as Inez Sepulveda
- Tom B. Forman as Juan Sepulveda
- Bud Osborne as Henchman
- Cliff Lyons as Brill Lonergan
- Bobby Dunn as Gimpy Lamb
- Arden Ellis as Peg Sagel

== Bibliography ==
- Pitts, Michael R. Poverty Row Studios, 1929–1940. McFarland & Company, 2005. ISBN 978-0-7864-2319-4.
