= Two Fisted Justice (1931 film) =

American Western film

- Directed by: George Arthur Durlam
- Written by: George Arthur Durlam
- Produced by: Trem Carr
- Starring: Tom Tyler; Barbara Weeks; William Walling
- Cinematography: Archie Stout
- Edited by: J. Logan Pearson; Leonard Wheeler
- Production company: Trem Carr Pictures
- Distributed by: Monogram Pictures
- Release date: October 20, 1931
- Running time: 63 minutes
- Country: United States
- Language: English

Two Fisted Justice is a 1931 American Western film directed by George Arthur Durlam that takes place during the American Civil War. The film stars Tom Tyler, Barbara Weeks, and William Walling.

== Plot ==
As the Civil War begins, Carson is sent by President Lincoln to protect a frontier outpost. Accompanied by youngster Danny, Carson thwarts a band of stagecoach robbers and saves a wagon train.

== Cast ==
- Tom Tyler as Kentucky Carson
- Barbara Weeks as Nancy Cameron
- Bobbie Nelson as Danny
- William Walling as Nick Slavin
- John Elliot as Cameron
- Gordon De Main as Huton
- Yakima Canutt as Perkins
- Pedro Regas as Cheyenne Charley
- Carl de Loro as Red
- Kit Guard as Temple
