= Helen Holmes (actress) =

American actress

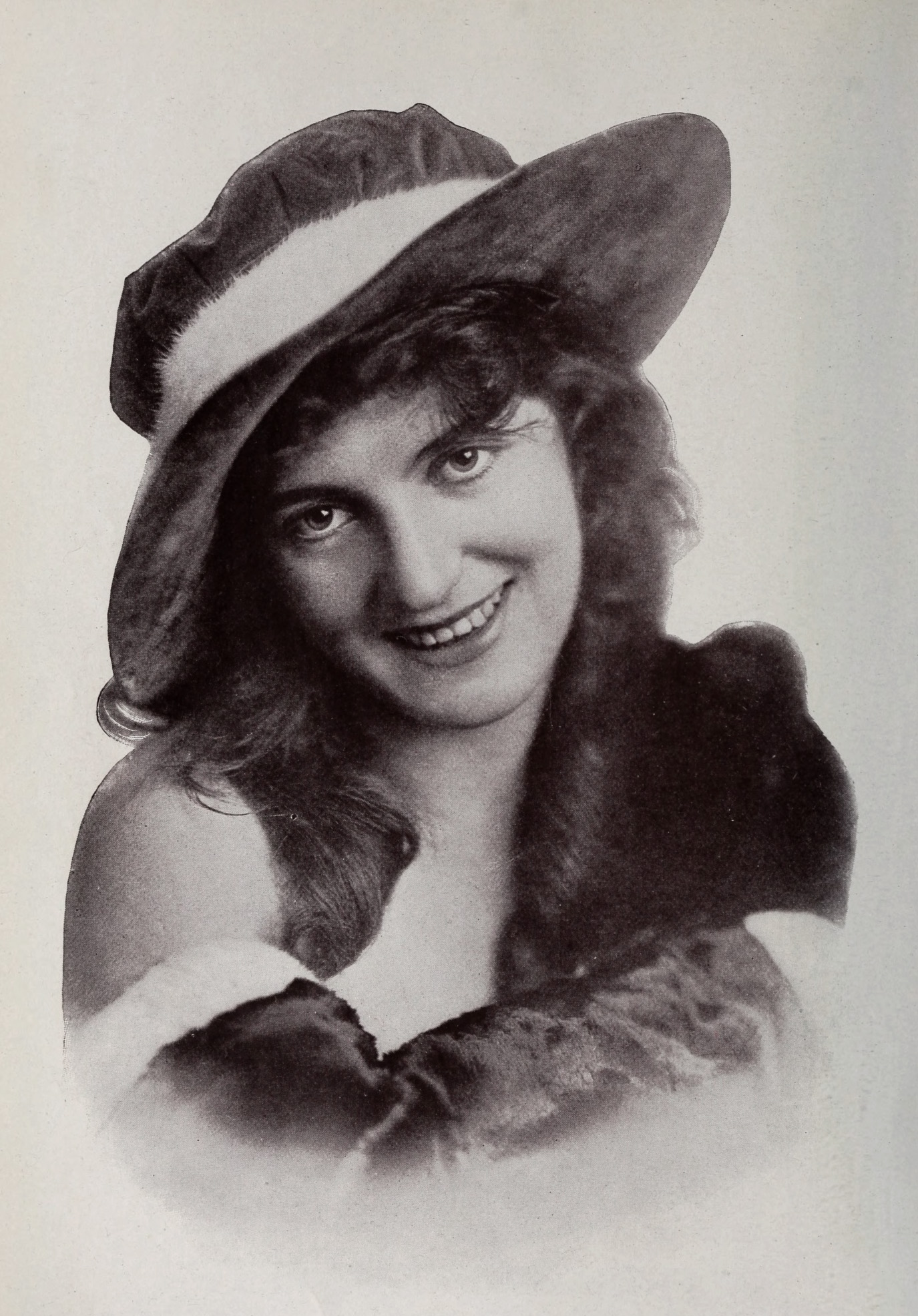
- Holmes, c. 1914
- Born: Helen Holmes; June 19, 1892; Chicago, Illinois, U.S.
- Died: July 8, 1950 (aged 58); Burbank, California, U.S.
- Resting place: Forest Lawn Memorial Park (Glendale)
- Occupations: Actor, film director, film producer, screenwriter
- Years active: 1912–1943
- Spouse(s): J.P. McGowan (unknown-1925); Lloyd Saunders (?-1946) (his death)

Helen Holmes (June 19, 1892 – July 8, 1950) was an American silent film actress, producer, director, screenwriter and stuntwoman. She is most notable for starring in the 1914–1917 serial The Hazards of Helen.

== Life ==
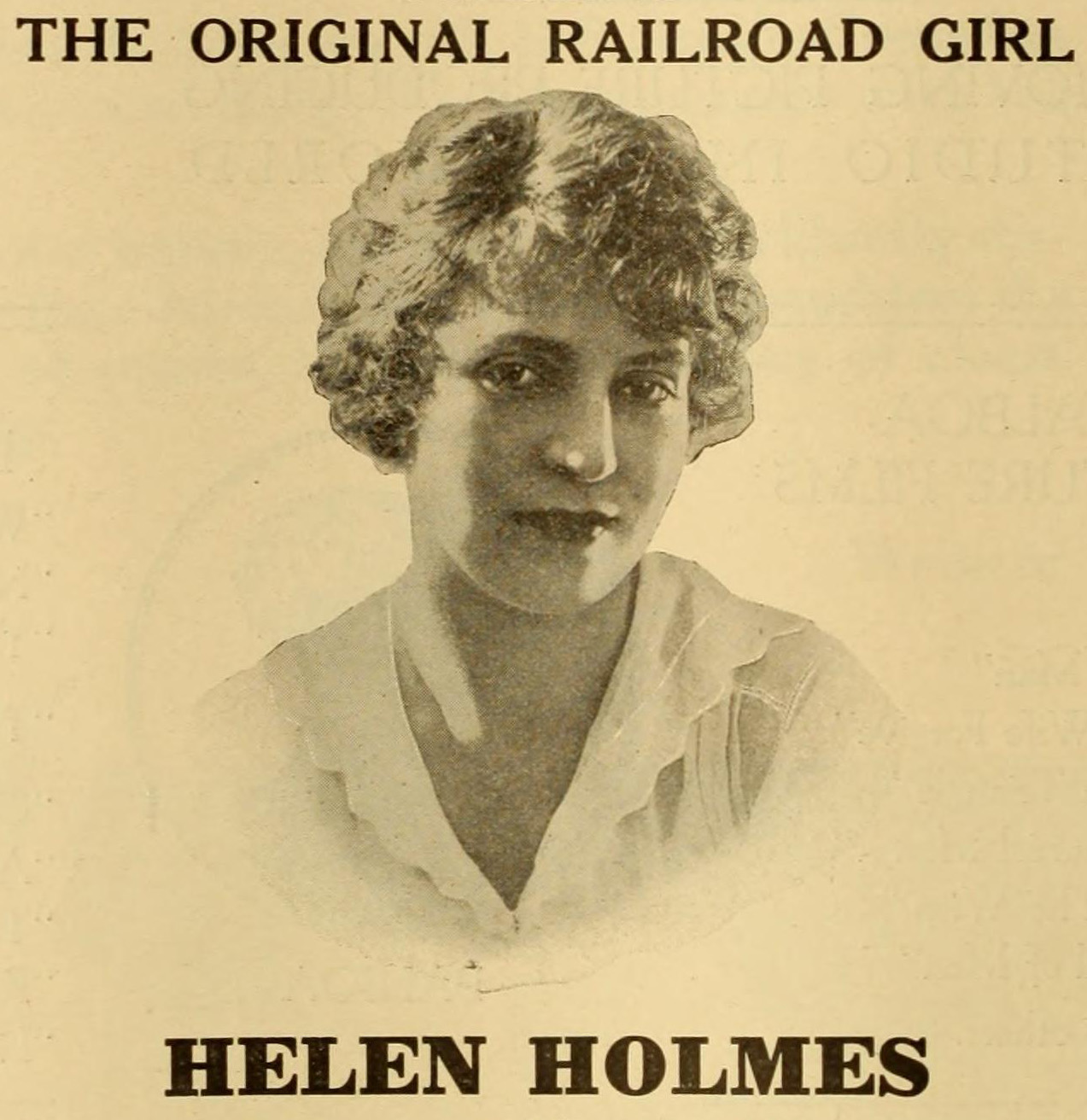
Advertisement in The Moving Picture World, 1916

Helen Holmes was born on June 19, 1892, in Illinois. While there is uncertainty about her place of birth, Holmes stated in an interview that she was born on a farm in South Bend, Indiana, but grew up in Chicago, Illinois. A 1917 article indicates Holmes was born on her father's private railroad car, "Estevan".

Holmes was the daughter of Norwegian immigrant Louis A. Holmes (born in Norway in October 1862), a railroad clerk employed by the Illinois Central Railroad, who had migrated to the United States in 1867, and his wife Sophia (born April 1869 in Indiana), and was the sister of Frank O. Holmes (born June 1889 in Illinois) and Florence (born in May 1896 in Illinois), and two other siblings who died in infancy.

Holmes was educated in St Mary's Convent in South Bend, Indiana. Holmes began working as a photographer's model but turned to acting, performing in live theatre and making her Broadway debut in 1909. She became friends with film star Mabel Normand.

Due to tuberculosis in the family, about 1910 Holmes and her widowed mother and siblings moved to California Valley, a few miles east of Shoshone in Death Valley, California, where they lost their life savings in a real estate swindle buying a property by the Colorado River. Meanwhile, Mabel Normand moved to Hollywood in 1912 to work at Mack Sennett's Keystone Studios, and she encouraged Holmes, after her brother had died, to try the film business in the balmier climes of the West Coast.

Throughout her career, Helen Holmes had occasionally gone back to performing in the theatre, and with the end of her marriage in 1925 she returned to the stage, making her last appearance on Broadway in 1935. She eventually married film stuntman Lloyd A. Saunders and as a result of the popularity of the Rin Tin Tin dog films, the two began training animals for use in the movies. After retiring from movies, Helen ran a small antique business in her San Fernando home. She had an extensive collection of rare dolls.

Lloyd died in 1946, and Helen died in 1950 as a result of heart failure. She had been ill for five years with a heart condition. She died in Burbank, California at her home, 1401 West Olive Street. She was 58 years old. Funeral services were conducted at Pierce Brothers Hollywood Chapel at 5959 Santa Monica Blvd., Los Angeles, California. She was interred at the Forest Lawn Memorial Park Cemetery in Glendale, California.

== Career ==
Holmes began her film career in 1912 with Keystone Studios in a bit part arranged by Mabel Normand. She made only a few more appearances in Keystone films and, although attractive, her lack of glamorous beauty relegated her to secondary roles until late 1913 when she signed with the Kalem Company's new Hollywood studio. Helen Holmes' first film at Kalem was directed by J.P. McGowan, with whom she would develop a relationship and soon marry. In her first two years with Kalem Studios, Holmes appeared in more than thirty film shorts during which time her athletic ability to do physically demanding stunts led to her big break.

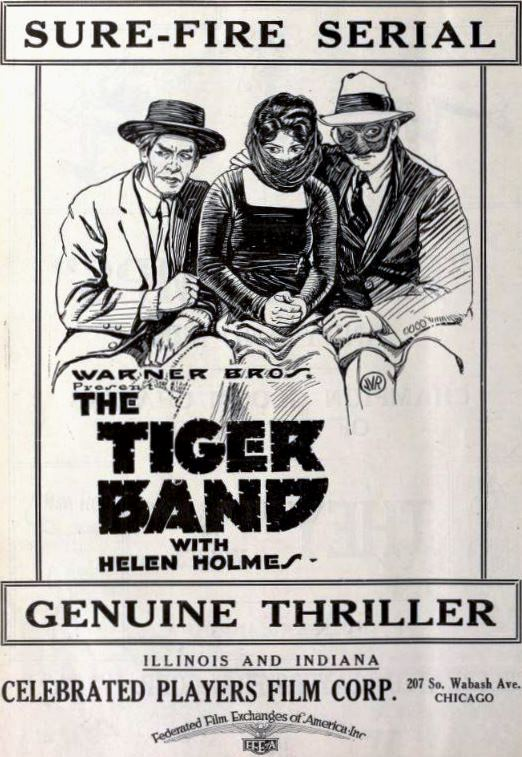
Holmes featured in the serial The Tiger Band (1920)

In March 1914, at a time when the women's suffrage movement was much in the news, Kalem Studios' competitor Pathé Frères released an adventure film serial titled The Perils of Pauline. Starring Pearl White as a bold and daring heroine, the Pathé serial became an enormous box-office success. As a result, Kalem Studios jumped on the bandwagon and in November 1914 released their own adventure series called The Hazards of Helen.

Cast as the series star, during the twenty-six "thrill-a-minute" episodes in which Helen Holmes performed, she did almost all of her own stunts. Playing an independent, quick-thinking and inventive heroine, as part of her dangerous exploits Helen did such things as leap onto runaway trains or treacherously chase after the film's villainous train robbers. While occasionally the plot called for Helen to be rescued by a handsome male hero, in most episodes it was Helen herself who was forced to find an ingenious way out of her dire predicament.

The Hazards of Helen made Holmes a major star and she and her now husband, director J.P McGowan, decided to capitalize on her fame and left Kalem to work for Thomas H. Ince Productions and Universal Pictures. After a few films, Holmes and McGowan formed Signal Film Productions to make their own adventure films. Between late 1915 and early 1917, they made a dozen films together that met with reasonable success but financial and distribution problems ended the production partnership and Holmes did not appear in another film until 1919, this time as the star in another film company's production.

In 1919 and 1920, she made only one film each year and only two in each of the next three years. During those years she not only starred in, but also produced, a serial film by the Warner Brothers called The Tiger Band (1920). Between 1924 and 1926, Helen Holmes made eighteen more short adventure films, but her popularity began to wane in a market over-saturated with female cliffhanger films. Holmes made several Westerns opposite actor and rodeo performer Jack Hoxie in the mid-1920s.

== Partial filmography ==
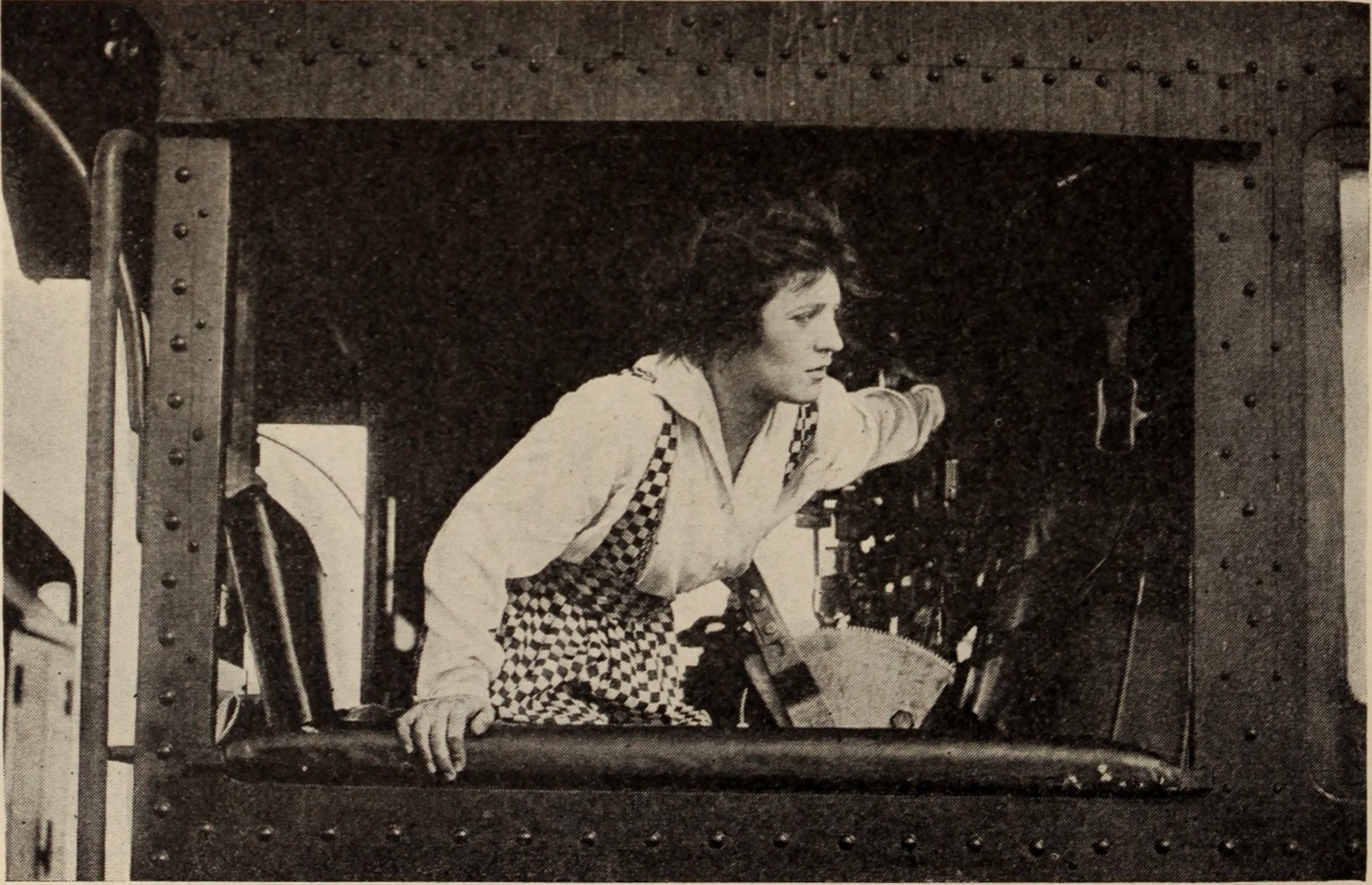
Film still with Holmes "at the throttle" of a locomotive in The Girl and the Game (1916)

- Barney Oldfield's Race for a Life (1913)
- The Hazards of Helen (1914–15)
- Lass of the Lumberlands (1916)
- The Girl and the Game (1916)
- The Manager of the B.& A. (1916)
- The Diamond Runners (1916)
- Judith of the Cumberlands (1916)
- Medicine Bend (1916)
- The Tiger Band (1920), a serial
- Hills of Missing Men (1922)
- The Lone Hand (1922)
- Stormy Seas (1923)
- One Million in Jewels (1923)
- 40-Horse Hawkins (1924)
- Fighting Fury (1924)
- The Riddle Rider (1924)
- The Sign of the Cactus (1925)
- Duped (1925)
- Blood and Steel (1925)
- Mistaken Orders (1925)
- Barriers of the Law (1925)
- The Open Switch (1925)
- Perils of the Rail (1925)
- Outwitted (1925)
- Crossed Signals (1926)
- The Lost Express (1926)
- The More the Merrier (1943)
