= Riding Romance =

1925 American Western film

- Directed by: J.P. McGowan
- Written by: William Berke; George Arthur Durlam
- Produced by: Morris R. Schlank
- Starring: Al Hoxie; Marjorie Bonner; Steve Clemente
- Cinematography: Walter L. Griffin
- Production company: Morris R. Schlank Productions
- Distributed by: Anchor Film Distributors
- Release date: July 1925
- Running time: 50 minutes
- Country: United States
- Languages: Silent; English intertitles

Riding Romance is a 1925 American silent Western film directed by J.P. McGowan and starring Al Hoxie, Marjorie Bonner and Steve Clemente.

== Cast ==
- Al Hoxie as Lawton, the Stranger
- Marjorie Bonner as Beth Brandon
- Arthur Morrison as'Shotgun' Morgan
- Steve Clemente as Morgan Henchman
- Cliff Lyons as Jeff Brandon
- J.P. McGowan as John Brandon

== Bibliography ==
- Langman, Larry. A Guide to Silent Westerns. Greenwood Publishing Group, 1992.
- McGowan, John J. J.P. McGowan: Biography of a Hollywood Pioneer. McFarland, 2005.
