= The Sign of the Cactus =

1925 film

- Directed by: Clifford Smith
- Story by: Isadore Bernstein
- Starring: Jack Hoxie; Helen Holmes; J. Gordon Russell
- Cinematography: Harry Neumann
- Production company: Universal Pictures
- Distributed by: Universal Pictures
- Release date: January 4, 1925
- Running time: 50 minutes
- Country: United States
- Languages: Silent; English intertitles

The Sign of the Cactus is a 1925 American silent Western film directed by Clifford Smith and starring Jack Hoxie, Helen Holmes, and J. Gordon Russell.

== Plot ==
As described in a review in a film magazine, settler Old Man Hayes resists the attempt of the water company to secure his property and is killed. Years later, a mysterious champion known as Whitehorse Champion arises and helps the settlers in their fight to keep their cattle from dying of thirst. He is called that because of the color of his mount and because he leaves a bit of cactus as a sign of his visit. Lawyer John Henderton is the representative of the water interests and his daughter Belle, while riding through the woods, sees her horse run off to be with its mate, the horse of Whitehouse Cactus, who is really Hayes' son Jack. He discovers by a scar on the hand of Belle that she was the little girl playmate of his many years ago when he was a child, and they become fast friends. Later, Belle discovers that Jack is the mysterious champion, and, when her father is shot, she goes to arrest Jack herself. He convinces her of his innocence. When the sheriff arrives, she notes that Belle is the only one who can prove that Jack is the Whitehorse Cactus, but that a wife cannot be made to testify against her husband. Jack happily agrees to the arrangement.

== Cast ==
- Jack Hoxie as Jack Hayes
- Helen Holmes as Belle Henderton
- J. Gordon Russell as John Henderton
- Francis Ford as Panhandle George
- Josef Swickard as Old Man Hayes
- Frank Newburg as Earl of Chico
- Jack Pratt as Sheriff
- Robert Gordon as Jack, as a boy
- Muriel Frances Dana as Belle, as a girl

== Preservation ==
With no copies of The Sign of the Cactus located in any film archives, it is a lost film.

== Bibliography ==
- Munden, Kenneth White. The American Film Institute Catalog of Motion Pictures Produced in the United States, Part 1. University of California Press, 1997.
