= Drifting Souls =

1932 film

- Directed by: Louis King
- Written by: Douglas Z. Doty; Norman Houston; Barbara Hunter (novel)
- Produced by: Morris R. Schlank
- Starring: Lois Wilson; Theodore von Eltz; Raymond Hatton
- Cinematography: William Hyer
- Edited by: Irving Birnbaum
- Production company: Tower Productions
- Distributed by: Capitol Film Exchange
- Release date: August 9, 1932
- Running time: 64 minutes
- Country: United States
- Language: English

Drifting Souls is a 1932 American Pre-Code drama film directed by Louis King and starring Lois Wilson, Theodore von Eltz and Raymond Hatton.

== Cast ==
- Lois Wilson as Linda Lawrence
- Theodore von Eltz as Joe Robson
- Raymond Hatton as Scoop
- Gene Gowing as Ted Merritt
- Shirley Grey as Greta Janson
- Guinn "Big Boy" Williams as Bing
- Mischa Auer as Skeets
- Edmund Breese as Brad Martin
- Bryant Washburn as Littlefield
- Edward LeSaint as Doctor
- Blanche Payson as Landlady

== Bibliography ==
- Pitts, Michael R. Poverty Row Studios, 1929–1940: An Illustrated History of 55 Independent Film Companies, with a Filmography for Each. McFarland & Company, 2005.
