= The Road Agent =

1926 American film

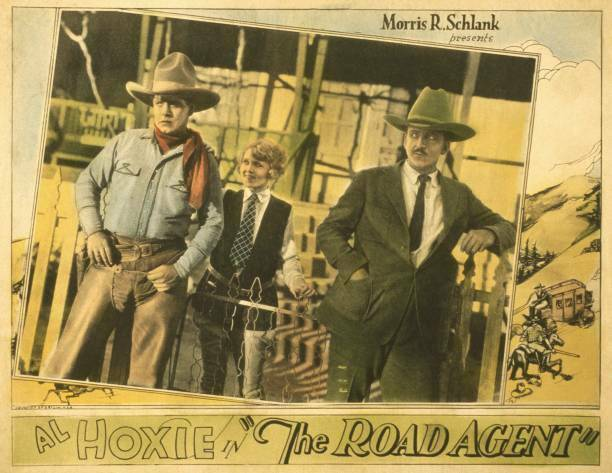
- Directed by: J.P. McGowan
- Written by: Charlie Saxton
- Produced by: Morris R. Schlank
- Starring: Al Hoxie; Ione Reed; Lew Meehan
- Cinematography: Robert E. Cline
- Edited by: Thelma Smith
- Production company: Morris R. Schlank Productions
- Distributed by: Rayart Pictures
- Release date: May 1926
- Running time: 55 minutes
- Country: United States
- Languages: Silent; English intertitles

The Road Agent is a 1926 American silent Western film directed by J.P. McGowan and starring Al Hoxie, Ione Reed and Lew Meehan.

== Cast ==
- Al Hoxie as Roger Worth / The Kansas Kid
- Ione Reed as Mary Ryan
- Lew Meehan as Attorney Frank Craven
- Leon De La Mothe as Henchman Hammer Hawkins
- Florence Lee as Mrs. Worth - the Mother
- Frank Ellis as The Sheriff
- Ted Adams as The Doctor
- Roy Bucko as Henchman
- Tex Phelps as Saloon Brawler
- Archie Ricks as Short Henchman

== Bibliography ==
- Pitts, Michael R. Western Movies: A Guide to 5,105 Feature Films. McFarland, 2012.
- McGowan, John J. J.P. McGowan: Biography of a Hollywood Pioneer. McFarland, 2005.
