= The Valley of Hell (film) =

1927 film

- Directed by: Clifford Smith
- Written by: Isadore Bernstein
- Starring: Francis McDonald; Edna Murphy; William Steele
- Cinematography: George Stevens; Jack Roach
- Production company: Metro-Goldwyn-Mayer
- Distributed by: Metro-Goldwyn-Mayer
- Release date: February 19, 1927
- Running time: 50 minutes
- Country: United States
- Languages: Silent; English intertitles

The Valley of Hell is a 1927 American silent Western film directed by Clifford Smith.

Only 2 reels survive of this film at George Eastman Museum.

== Plot ==
In the Old West, a dashing hero saves a girl from bandits.

== Cast ==
- Francis McDonald - Creighton Steele
- Edna Murphy - Mary Calvert
- William Steele - James Brady
