= The Back Trail =

1924 film

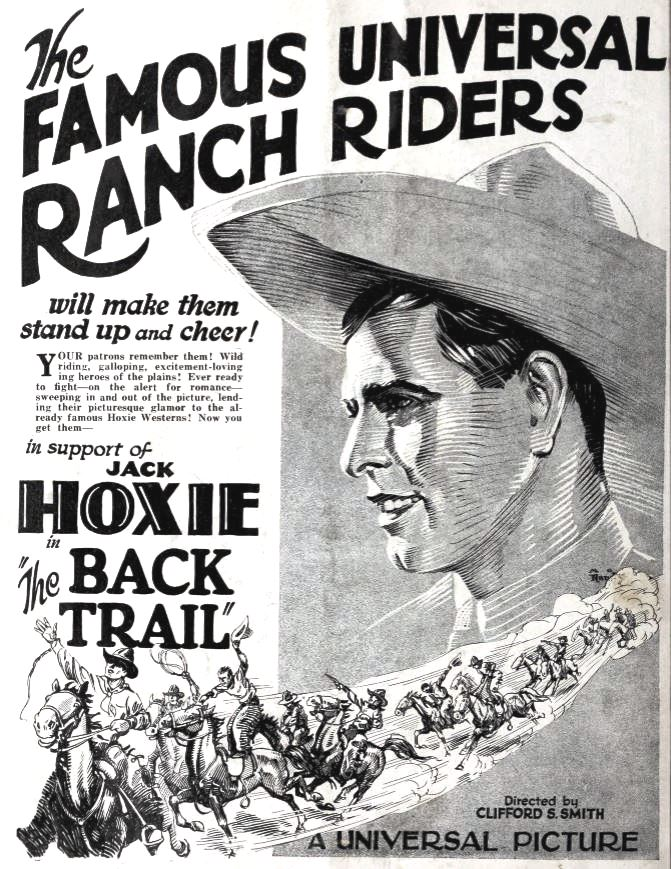
- Directed by: George Marshall; Clifford Smith
- Written by: Isadore Bernstein; Walter J. Coburn; George Hoag
- Produced by: Carl Laemmle
- Starring: Jack Hoxie; Eugenia Gilbert; Al Hoxie
- Cinematography: Harry Neumann
- Production company: Universal Pictures
- Distributed by: Universal Pictures
- Release date: June 16, 1924
- Running time: 50 minutes
- Country: United States
- Languages: Silent; English intertitles

The Back Trail is a 1924 American silent Western film directed by George Marshall and Clifford Smith and starring Jack Hoxie, Eugenia Gilbert and Al Hoxie. A print of The Back Trail exists.

== Cast ==
- Jack Hoxie as Jeff Prouty
- Al Hoxie as The Tramp
- Eugenia Gilbert as Ardis Andrews
- Claude Payton as Gentleman Harry King
- William Berke as Jim Lawton
- William McCall as Judge Jefferson Talent
- Buck Connors as Shorty
- Pat Harmon as Curry

== Bibliography ==
- Langman, Larry. A Guide to Silent Westerns. Greenwood Publishing Group, 1992.
