= Behind the Evidence (film) =

1935 film

- Directed by: Lambert Hillyer
- Written by: Harold Shumate
- Starring: Norman Foster; Sheila Bromley; Donald Cook
- Cinematography: Henry Freulich
- Edited by: Richard Cahoon
- Production company: Columbia Pictures
- Distributed by: Columbia Pictures
- Release date: January 8, 1935
- Running time: 70 minutes
- Country: United States
- Language: English

Behind the Evidence is a 1935 American crime film directed by Lambert Hillyer and starring Norman Foster, Sheila Bromley and Donald Cook. It was produced and distributed by Columbia Pictures.

== Cast ==
- Norman Foster as Tony Sheridan
- Sheila Bromley as Ruth Allen
- Donald Cook as Ward Cameron
- Geneva Mitchell as Rita Sinclair
- Samuel S. Hinds as J.T. Allen
- Frank Darien as Herbert
- Pat O'Malley as Police Lt. James
- Gordon De Main as Captain Graham
- Edward Keane as Hackett
- Lucille Ball as Secretary

== Bibliography ==
- Patricia King Hanson. The American Film Institute Catalog of Motion Pictures Produced in the United States: Feature Films, 1931-1940, Volumes 1-3. University of California Press, 1993.
