= Teddy Reavis =

Teddy Reavis was an actor. She starred with Fred Parker in the William Pizor produced film A Chocolate Cowboy and was billed in advertisements for it along with Parker. She also starred with Sid Smith in Heave-Ho. Both films are extant. She also starred in the 1927 film serial The Mansion of Mystery opposite William Barrymore.

She co-starred with Sid Smith in comedy shorts.

== Filmography ==
- A Chocolate Cowboy (1925) a.k.a. Mine Your Business
- Mansion of Mystery (1927)
- Heave-Ho (1928), extant film
- The She Beast (1927), a comedy short with Sid Smith
- Tom-Boy, a comedy short directed by Joe Smithly. Extant.
