= Captain Cowboy =

1929 film directed by J.P. McGowan

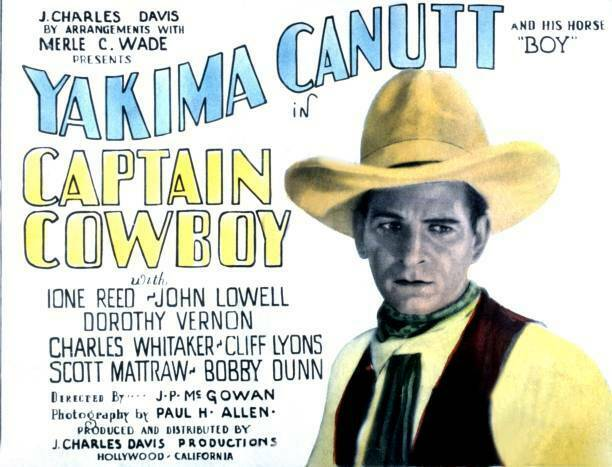
- Directed by: J.P. McGowan
- Written by: J. P. McGowan
- Produced by: J. Charles Davis
- Starring: Yakima Canutt; Ione Reed; John Lowell
- Cinematography: Paul H. Allen
- Edited by: J. P. McGowan
- Production company: J. Charles Davis Productions
- Distributed by: Bell Pictures
- Release date: May 29, 1929
- Running time: 50 minutes
- Country: United States
- Languages: Silent; English intertitles

Captain Cowboy is a 1929 American silent Western film directed by J.P. McGowan and starring Yakima Canutt, Ione Reed and John Lowell.

== Cast ==
- Yakima Canutt
- Ione Reed
- Slim Whitaker
- John Lowell
- Bobby Dunn
- Betty Carter
- Lynn Sanderson
- Scotty Mattraw
- Cliff Lyons
