= Sheila Bromley =

American actress (1907–2003)

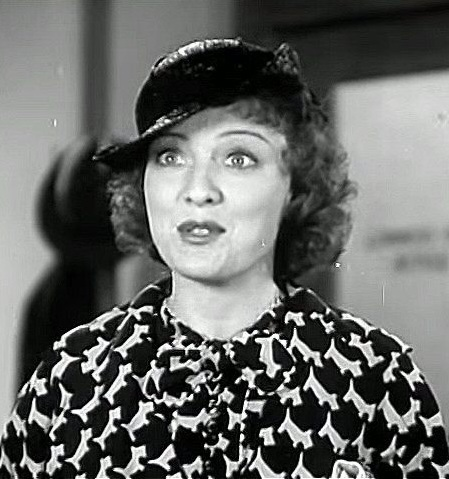
- Bromley in Danger Ahead (1935)
- Born: Louise Fulton; October 31, 1907; San Francisco, California, U.S.
- Died: July 23, 2003 (aged 95); Los Angeles, California, U.S.
- Other names: Sheila LeGay; Sheila Manners; Sheila Mannors; Sheila Manors
- Occupation: Actress
- Years active: 1930-1975
- Spouses: Arthur Morris Applebaum; Jairus Bellamy (m. 1945)

Sheila Bromley (born Louise Fulton; October 31, 1907 – July 23, 2003), also billed early in her career as Sheila LeGay, Sheila Manners, Sheila Mannors or Sheila Manors, was an American television and film actress. She is best known for her roles in B-movies.

== Early years ==
Louise Fulton was born in San Francisco, California. She attended Hollywood High School, and her first acting experience came at the Pasadena Playhouse. She was a Miss California.

== Career ==
Bromley began her career in the early 1930s on contract with Monogram Pictures, she was first billed as Sheila LeGay starring in 1930 westerns. She frequently co-starred with Ken Maynard, Hoot Gibson, Johnny Mack Brown, Bill Cody, and Dick Foran. She starred with John Wayne in the 1935 films Westward Ho and Lawless Range and the 1937 film Idol of the Crowds. Bromley appeared uncredited in the Marx Brothers film Horse Feathers (1932), where she delivered the line "The dean is furious! He's waxing wroth!" In 1944, she appeared in the touring production of Good Night Ladies. Bromley performed on Broadway in Time for Elizabeth (1948).

In 1960, she appeared as Mrs. Spencer in the Rawhide episode "Incident of the Deserter". She appeared in one episode of I Love Lucy as Helen Erickson Kaiser, the childhood friend of Lucy Ricardo. She made five guest appearances on Perry Mason during the series' nine-year run on CBS. In her first appearance in 1959, she played co-defendant Agnes Nulty in "The Case of the Borrowed Brunette". In 1962, she played murderer Elizabeth Dow in "The Case of the Mystified Miner", and in 1964, she played Alice Bradley in "The Case of the Nervous Neighbor". Her last appearance on Perry Mason was in the episode "The Case of the Deadly Debt". She also guest-starred in a 1965 episode of The Cara Williams Show.

During World War II, she worked often for the USO, continuing that service until the war ended in 1945. There she met her second husband, Jairus Bellamy. She is credited with 75 films in her career, and 17 were westerns. Bromley retired from films in the 1970s and lived in the Greater Los Angeles Area until her death.

== Death ==
On July 23, 2003, Bromley died in Los Angeles, California. Obituaries in the Performing Arts, 2003 gave her age as 95.

== Selected filmography ==
- Call of the Desert (1930) - Jean Walker
- The Canyon of Missing Men (1930) – Inez Sepulveda
- The Storm (1930) – Girl with Horse and Buggy (uncredited)
- Playthings of Hollywood (1930) – Beth King
- Ten Nights in a Barroom (1931) – June Manners
- Daddy Long Legs (1931) – Gloria
- The Lawyer's Secret (1931) – Madge, Madame X's Girlfriend (uncredited)
- Land of Wanted Men (1931) – Cynthia
- Girls About Town (1931) – Party Girl (uncredited)
- Working Girls (1931) – Carrie (uncredited)
- Texas Gun Fighter (1932) – Jane Adams
- She Wanted a Millionaire (1932) – Beauty Contest Contestant (uncredited)
- Lady with a Past (1932) – Party Guest (uncredited)
- Texas Pioneers (1932) – Nancy Thomas
- Play Girl (1932) – Wedding Girl (scenes deleted)
- One Hour with You (1932) – Colette's Downstairs Maid (uncredited)
- Lady and Gent (1932) – Hat Check Girl (uncredited)
- Winner Take All (1932) – Joan's Friend (uncredited)
- Horse Feathers (1932) – Wagstaff's Receptionist (uncredited)
- Tiger Shark (1932) – 'Red' (uncredited)
- Cowboy Counsellor (1932) – Ruth Avery
- Her First Mate (1933) – Passenger on Boat Deck (uncredited)
- Meet the Baron (1933) – Equestrienne Wearing Black Vest (uncredited)
- Only Yesterday (1933) – May (uncredited)
- King for a Night (1933) – Telephone Operator (uncredited)
- The Woman Condemned (1934) – The Actress
- Glamour (1934) – Chorus Girl (uncredited)
- The Hell Cat (1934) – Minor Role (uncredited)
- That's Gratitude (1934) – Delia Maxwell
- The Merry Widow (1934) – Sonia's Maid (uncredited)
- The Prescott Kid (1934) – Dolores Ortega
- Behind the Evidence (1935) – Ruth Allen
- Carnival (1935) – Puppet Assistant (uncredited)
- Danger Ahead (1935) – Lorraine Matthews
- Together We Live (1935) – Mary
- Westward Ho (1935) – Mary Gordon
- Moonlight on the Prairie (1935) – Barbara Roberts
- Lawless Range (1935) – Ann Mason
- The Pace That Kills (1935) – Fanny
- Desert Phantom (1936) – Jean Halloran
- Kelly of the Secret Service (1936) – Sally Flint
- Born to Fight (1936) – Ada
- Lady Be Careful (1936) – Hazel
- Gold Diggers of 1937 (1936) – Chorus Girl (uncredited)
- Idol of the Crowds (1937) – Helen Dale
- West of Shanghai (1937) – Lola Galt
- Luck of Roaring Camp (1937) – Susan Oakhurst
- Missing Witnesses (1937) – Gladys Wagner
- Making the Headlines (1938) – Grace Sandford
- King of the Newsboys (1938) – Connie Madison
- Accidents Will Happen (1938) – Nona Gregg
- Mystery House (1938) – Terice Von Elm
- Reformatory (1938) – Mrs. Regan
- Rebellious Daughters (1938) – Flo
- Girls on Probation (1938) – Hilda Engstrom
- Nancy Drew... Reporter (1939) – Bonnie Lucas
- Women in the Wind (1939) – Frieda Boreman
- Death Goes North (1939) – Elsie Barlow
- Waterfront (1939) – Marie Cordell aka Mary Allen
- Torchy Blane... Playing with Dynamite (1939) – 'Jackie' McGuire
- Torture Ship (1939) – Poison Mary Slavish
- Thou Shalt Not Kill (1939) – Julie Mancini
- Calling Philo Vance (1940) – Doris
- A Fugitive from Justice (1940) – Ruby Patterson
- Time to Kill (1942) – Lois Morny
- The House on 92nd Street (1945) – Beauty Parlor Customer (uncredited)
- A Star Is Born (1954) – Shrine Auditorium Reporter (uncredited)
- Alfred Hitchcock Presents (1956) (Season 1 Episode 36: "Mink") - Lois
- There's Always Tomorrow (1956) – Woman from Pasadena
- World in My Corner (1956) – Mrs. Mallinson
- A Day of Fury (1956) – Marie
- Spoilers of the Forest (1957) – Linda Mitchell
- The Lawless Eighties (1957) – Mrs. Myra Sutter
- Alfred Hitchcock Presents (1959) (Season 5 Episode 14: "Graduating Class") - Dorothy the Principal
- Ice Palace (1960) – Lucy Husack (uncredited)
- Young Jesse James (1960) – Mrs. Samuels
- Judgment at Nuremberg (1961) – Mrs. Ives (uncredited)
- The Alfred Hitchcock Hour (1964) (Season 2 Episode 16: "The Evil of Adelaide Winters") - Mrs. Thompson
- For Those Who Think Young (1964) – Mrs. Harkness
- The Girls on the Beach (1965) – Mrs. Winters
- Hotel (1967) – Mrs. Grandin
- Nightmare Circus (1974) – Mrs. Baynes
