= Unseen Enemies =

1926 film directed by J. P. McGowan

- Directed by: J.P. McGowan
- Written by: William Berke
- Produced by: Morris R. Schlank
- Starring: Al Hoxie; Claire Anderson
- Cinematography: Bert Baldridge
- Production company: Morris R. Schlank Productions
- Distributed by: Anchor Film Distributors
- Release date: January 7, 1926
- Running time: 50 minutes
- Country: United States
- Languages: Silent; English intertitles

Unseen Enemies is a 1926 American silent Western film directed by J.P. McGowan and starring Al Hoxie and Claire Anderson.

== Cast ==
- Al Hoxie as 'Happened-Along' Meredith
- Claire Anderson as Doris Davenport
- Catherine Craig as Laura Stribling
- Bob Kortman as 'Bingo' Strook
- Max Asher as 'Doughnut' Casey
- Bud Gildebrand as First Davenport Boy
- Clayton Gildebrand as Second Davenport Boy
- Mack V. Wright as Henchman

== Bibliography ==
- Langman, Larry. A Guide to Silent Westerns. Greenwood Publishing Group, 1992.
- McGowan, John J. J.P. McGowan: Biography of a Hollywood Pioneer. McFarland, 2005.
