= Dangerous Trails =

1923 film

- Directed by: Alan James
- Produced by: Morris R. Schlank
- Starring: Irene Rich; Tully Marshall; Noah Beery
- Production company: Rocky Mountain Productions
- Distributed by: Anchor Film Distributors
- Release date: January 10, 1923
- Running time: 60 minutes
- Country: United States
- Language: Silent (English intertitles)

Dangerous Trails is a 1923 American silent Western film directed by Alan James and starring Irene Rich, Tully Marshall, and Noah Beery. It is a northern, featuring a member of the North-West Mounted Police on the track of a smuggling gang.

== Plot ==
As described in a film magazine review, Steve Bradley, a dance hall proprietor in the Canadian Northwest, is in league with opium smugglers Jean Le Fere and Wang. Steve is engaged to Grace Alderson, a singer in his resort. Roland St. Clair, a North-West Mounted Police detective, goes on the smugglers' trail. Grace vamps him and they fall in love. In the finale, after many wild adventures, the smugglers are captured across the border in the United States when federal officers raid Wang's Chinatown den. Grace turns out to be in the employ of the police and marries St. Clair.

== Cast ==
- Irene Rich as Grace Alderson
- Tully Marshall as Steve Bradley
- Noah Beery as Inspector Criswell
- Allan Penrose as Roland St. Clair
- William Lowery as Jean Le Fere
- Jack Curtis as Wang
- Jane Talent as Beatrice Layton

== Bibliography ==
- Connelly, Robert B. The Silents: Silent Feature Films, 1910-36, Volume 40, Issue 2. December Press, 1998.
- Munden, Kenneth White. The American Film Institute Catalog of Motion Pictures Produced in the United States, Part 1. University of California Press, 1997.
