= Clifford Smith (director) =

American film director (1894–1937)

- Born: August 22, 1894; Richmond, Indiana, United States
- Died: September 17, 1937 (aged 43); Los Angeles, California, United States
- Occupation: Actor
- Years active: 1912–1937 (film)

Clifford Smith (1894–1937) was an American film director who also occasionally acted and produced. He directed over eighty films between 1915 and 1937 as well as several serials, doing much of his work for Universal Pictures. Primarily a director of westerns he worked with leading genre stars such as William S. Hart.

== Selected filmography ==
- The Apostle of Vengeance (1916)
- One Shot Ross (1917)
- The Boss of the Lazy Y (1917)
- The Learning of Jim Benton (1917)
- The Medicine Man (1917)
- The Red-Haired Cupid (1918)
- The Cyclone (1920)
- 3 Gold Coins (1920)
- Crossing Trails (1921)
- Daring Danger (1922)
- Wild Bill Hickok (1923)
- Ridgeway of Montana (1924)
- The Back Trail (1924)
- Singer Jim McKee (1924)
- Fighting Fury (1924)
- The Sign of the Cactus (1925)
- A Roaring Adventure (1925)
- The Red Rider (1925)
- Ridin' Thunder (1925)
- Bustin' Thru (1925)
- The White Outlaw (1925)
- The Call of Courage (1925)
- The Fighting Peacemaker (1926)
- The Wild Horse Stampede (1926)
- The Desert's Toll (1926)
- The Man in the Saddle (1926)
- The Terror (1926)
- The Phantom Bullet (1926)
- Sky High Corral (1926)
- The Demon (1926)
- Rustlers' Ranch (1926)
- A Six Shootin' Romance (1926)
- The Ridin' Rascal (1926)
- The Scrappin' Kid (1926)
- The Set-Up (1926)
- The Arizona Sweepstakes (1926)
- Open Range (1927)
- Loco Luck (1927)
- The Valley of Hell (1927)
- The Three Outcasts (1929)
- The Texan (1932)
- Five Bad Men (1935)
- Wild West Days (1937, serial)
- Radio Patrol (1937, serial)
- Secret Agent X-9 (1937, serial)
- Jungle Jim (1937, serial)

== Bibliography ==
- Henryk Hoffmann. Western Movie References in American Literature. McFarland, 2012.
