= The Flaming Signal =

1933 film

- Directed by: George Jeske; Charles E. Roberts
- Written by: William G. Steuer; Charles E. Roberts; Thomas Hughes
- Produced by: William Berke; William M. Pizor
- Starring: Marceline Day; Noah Beery; Carmelita Geraghty
- Cinematography: Irvin Akers
- Edited by: Laurence Creutz
- Music by: Lee Zahler
- Production company: William Berke Productions
- Distributed by: Imperial Distributing Corporation
- Release date: July 25, 1933
- Running time: 64 minutes
- Country: United States
- Language: English

The Flaming Signal is a 1933 American adventure film directed by George Jeske and Charles E. Roberts and starring Marceline Day, Noah Beery and Carmelita Geraghty.

== Cast ==
- John David Horsley as Lt. Jim Robbins
- Marceline Day as Molly James
- Noah Beery as Otto Von Krantz
- Henry B. Walthall as Rev. Mr. James
- Carmelita Geraghty as Molly
- Mischa Auer as Manu—High Priest
- Francisco Alonso as Taku
- Jane'e Olmes as Rari
- Anya Gramina as French Girl
- Flash the Dog as Flash

== Bibliography ==
- Michael R. Pitts. Poverty Row Studios, 1929–1940: An Illustrated History of 55 Independent Film Companies, with a Filmography for Each. McFarland & Company, 2005.
