= Crossed Signals =

1926 film directed by J. P. McGowan

- Directed by: J.P. McGowan
- Written by: George Saxton
- Produced by: Morris R. Schlank
- Starring: Helen Holmes; Henry Victor; Georgie Chapman
- Cinematography: Robert E. Cline
- Edited by: Thelma Smith
- Production company: Harry J. Brown Productions
- Distributed by: Rayart Pictures
- Release date: September 28, 1926
- Running time: 52 minutes
- Country: United States
- Languages: Silent; English intertitles

Crossed Signals is a 1926 American silent action film directed by J.P. McGowan and starring Helen Holmes, Henry Victor and Georgie Chapman.

== Cast ==
- Helen Holmes as Helen Wainwright
- Henry Victor as Jack McDermott
- Georgie Chapman as Overland Ike
- William Lowery as George Harvey
- Milla Davenport as Mother Slattery
- Nelson McDowell as Mike Bradley
- Clyde McAtee as T.P. Steele
- Slim Whitaker as Henchman

uncredited

- Charlotte Greenwood as Mother with baby at train station

== Bibliography ==
- Munden, Kenneth White. The American Film Institute Catalog of Motion Pictures Produced in the United States, Part 1. University of California Press, 1997.
