= Rider of the Law (1927 film) =

1927 film

- Directed by: Paul Hurst
- Produced by: Bud Barsky
- Starring: Al Hoxie; Ione Reed; Cliff Lyons
- Production company: Bud Barsky Corporation
- Release date: January 15, 1927
- Running time: 50 minutes
- Country: United States
- Languages: Silent; English intertitles

Rider of the Law is a 1927 American silent Western film directed by Paul Hurst and starring Al Hoxie, Ione Reed and Cliff Lyons.

== Cast ==
- Al Hoxie as John McCrea
- Ione Reed as Marion
- Paul Hurst as Henry Baker
- Alfred Hewston as Will Kelly
- Cliff Lyons as Jimmy - Marion's Brother
- Bud Osborne as Henchman

== Bibliography ==
- Langman, Larry. A Guide to Silent Westerns. Greenwood Publishing Group, 1992.
