= The Texas Terror =

1925 film directed by J. P. McGowan

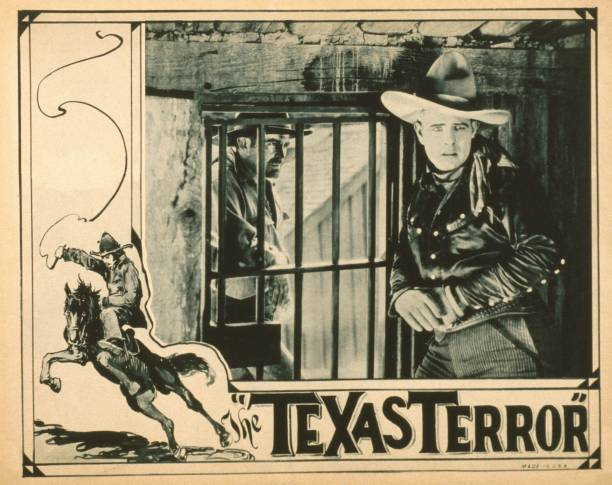
- Lobby card
- Directed by: J.P. McGowan
- Produced by: Morris R. Schlank
- Starring: Al Hoxie; Ione Reed
- Production company: Morris R. Schlank Productions
- Distributed by: Anchor Film Distributors
- Release date: July 1925
- Running time: 50 minutes
- Country: United States
- Languages: Silent; English intertitles

The Texas Terror is a lost 1925 American silent Western film directed by J.P. McGowan and starring Al Hoxie and Ione Reed.

== Cast ==
- Al Hoxie
- Ione Reed
- Edward Burns
- George B. Williams
- Toy Gallagher
- Bob Fleming
- Gordon Sackville
- Harry Tenbrook
- Mike Donovan

== Preservation ==
With no holdings located in archives, The Texas Terror is considered a lost film.

== Bibliography ==
- Katchmer, George A. A Biographical Dictionary of Silent Film Western Actors and Actresses. McFarland, 2015.
- McGowan, John J. J.P. McGowan: Biography of a Hollywood Pioneer. McFarland, 2005.
