= Ione Reed =

American actress

- Born: February 11, 1903; Cade, Texas, United States
- Died: August 11, 1985 (aged 82); Dallas, Texas, United States
- Occupation: Actress
- Years active: 1924–1945 (film)

Ione Reed (1903–1985) was an American film actress, a stunt double, and a safety instructor.

She played the female lead in a number of silent westerns.

Reed also worked as a stunt double, including doubling for Maureen O'Hara in The Hunchback of Notre Dame and for Claire Trevor in The Desperadoes.

In 1937 Reed was a member of an expedition to the Glapagos Islands and Central America. Sponsored by the California Zoological Society, the expedition went to collect birds and small animals for the society's Zoopark in Los Angeles. Reed was chosen to participate because of her "wide experience in handling animals".

Reed appeared in newspaper advertisements for Camel cigarettes.

A 1941 diagnosis of makeup poisoning led to a change in careers for Reed. A doctor told her that she could not use makeup for a year, so she sought other employment. Her first job was being a hot tinner in a radio factory, and in several months she had been promoted to head of the department. After that, she went to work for Lewyt, a company that manufactured electronic equipment, including radar devices, during World War II, and there her focus turned to plant safety. After she created several devices to protect workers, her boss made her a safety supervisor. She used her acting experience in training sessions to dramatize ways to avoid dangerous situations on the job. Improvements that she suggested led to fewer accidents and increased production at the factory.

== Selected filmography ==
- A Desperate Chance (1925)
- Fighting Luck (1925)
- The Road Agent (1925)
- The Texas Terror (1925)
- Blue Streak O'Neil (1926)
- Chasing Trouble (1926)
- Bucking the Truth (1926)
- Rider of the Law (1927)
- Outlaw's Paradise (1927)
- Across the Plains (1928)
- Cheyenne Trails (1928)
- Trails of Treachery (1928)
- West of the Rockies (1929)
- An Oklahoma Cowboy (1929)
- Captain Cowboy (1929)
- Riders of the Storm (1929)
- Below the Border (1929)
- The Man from Nowhere (1930)
- Western Honor (1930)
- Melody Trail (1935)
- The Buccaneer (1938)
- First Yank into Tokyo (1945)
