= The Riding Kid =

1931 film

- Directed by: Jack Irwin
- Written by: Jack Irwin
- Produced by: George Arthur Durlam
- Starring: Buddy Roosevelt; Jean Kay; Fred Church
- Cinematography: Arthur Reed
- Edited by: Earl Turner
- Production company: G.A. Durlam Productions
- Distributed by: Syndicate Pictures
- Release date: 1931
- Running time: 50 minutes
- Country: United States
- Language: English

The Riding Kid is a 1931 American Western film directed by Jack Irwin and starring Buddy Roosevelt, Jean Kay and Fred Church. The title is sometimes spelled The Ridin' Kid.

It was an independent production by the Poverty Row-based Syndicate Pictures.

== Plot ==
A cattle baron hires The Riding Kid and Pedro to drive out farmers so that he can buy their land. However, the Kid and Pedro side with the farmers, and the Kid falls in love with Miss Barton.

== Cast ==
- Buddy Roosevelt as John Denton aka The Ridin' Kid
- Jean Kay as Miss Barton
- Fred Church as Sam Eldridge
- William Bertram as Mark Perdue
- Sam Tittley as Tom Barton
- LaVerne Haag as Mrs. Barton
- Nick Dunray as Pedro
- Mary Martin as The Cook

== Bibliography ==
- Michael R. Pitts. Poverty Row Studios, 1929–1940: An Illustrated History of 55 Independent Film Companies, with a Filmography for Each. McFarland & Company, 2005.
