= Red Blood =

1925 film directed by J. P. McGowan

- Directed by: J.P. McGowan
- Written by: George Arthur Durlam
- Produced by: Morris R. Schlank
- Starring: Al Hoxie; Lew Meehan; Eddie Barry
- Cinematography: Robert E. Cline
- Edited by: Thelma Smith
- Production company: Morris R. Schlank Productions
- Distributed by: Anchor Film Distributors
- Release date: July 1925
- Running time: 57 minutes
- Country: United States
- Languages: Silent; English intertitles

Red Blood is a 1925 American silent Western film directed by J.P. McGowan and starring Al Hoxie, Lew Meehan and Eddie Barry.

== Cast ==
- Al Hoxie as Buck Marsden
- Marjorie Warfield as Edith Custer
- Lew Meehan as Dick 'Ace High' Willis
- Eddie Barry as Donald Custer
- J.P. McGowan as Eagle Custer
- Frances Kellogg as Carlotta
- Walter Patterson as Sodapop
- Lem Sowards as 'Broom'

== Bibliography ==
- Langman, Larry. A Guide to Silent Westerns. Greenwood Publishing Group, 1992.
- McGowan, John J. J.P. McGowan: Biography of a Hollywood Pioneer. McFarland, 2005.
