= Riders of the Storm =

1929 film directed by J. P. McGowan

- Directed by: J.P. McGowan
- Written by: J.P. McGowan
- Produced by: J. Charles Davis
- Starring: Yakima Canutt; Bobby Dunn; Ione Reed
- Cinematography: Paul H. Allen
- Production company: J. Charles Davis Productions
- Distributed by: Bell Pictures Corporation
- Release date: September 9, 1929
- Running time: 50 minutes
- Country: United States
- Languages: Silent; English intertitles

Riders of the Storm is a 1929 American silent Western film directed by J.P. McGowan and starring Yakima Canutt, Bobby Dunn and Ione Reed.

== Cast ==
- Yakima Canutt
- Bobby Dunn
- Ione Reed
- Dorothy Vernon
- Slim Whitaker

== Bibliography ==
- McGowan, John J. J.P. McGowan: Biography of a Hollywood Pioneer. McFarland, 2005.
