= Idol of the Crowds =

1937 film

- Theatrical poster
- Directed by: Arthur Lubin
- Screenplay by: George Waggner; Harold Buckley
- Story by: George Waggner
- Produced by: Trem Carr; Paul Malvern
- Starring: John Wayne; Sheila Bromley; Billy Burrud; Russell Hopton; Huntley Gordon; Charles Brokaw; Hal Neiman
- Cinematography: Harry Neumann
- Edited by: Charles Craft
- Production company: Universal Pictures
- Distributed by: Universal Pictures
- Release date: September 30, 1937
- Running time: 60 minutes
- Country: United States
- Language: English

Idol of the Crowds is a 1937 American sports drama film directed by Arthur Lubin and starring John Wayne as an ice hockey player. It was one of a series of non-Westerns Wayne made for Universal. The film was originally called Hell on Ice but the Hays Office requested this be changed.

== Plot ==
The New York Panthers ice hockey team is struggling in the standings. A scouting team headed by Kelly heads to Maine where they've heard of a promising former amateur player. He turns out to be John Hanson, now a chicken farmer.

Hanson does not wish to return to the game, but when he learns how much money he can make, he agrees solely so he can make enough to upgrade his farm. His skills make him an instant sensation, but as the team heads toward the championship series, he runs afoul of crooked gamblers and the beautiful woman they tempt him with.

== Cast ==
- John Wayne as Johnny Hanson
- Sheila Bromley as Helen Dale
- Russell Hopton as Jack Irwin
- Bill Burrud as Bobby
- Jane Johns as Peggy
- Huntley Gordon as Harvey Castle
- Frank Otto as Joe Garber
- Russell Hopton as Kelly
- Hal Neiman as Squat Bates
- Virginia Brissac as Mrs. Dale
- George Lloyd as Spike Regan
- Clem Bevans as Andy Moore
- Wayne Castle as Swifty
- Lloyd Ford as Hank
- Lee Ford as Elmer

== Production ==
The film was announced in April 1937. In May Universal announced the film as part of its upcoming output.

Filming took place in May. Wayne later said "I'm from Southern California. I've never been on [expletive] skates in my life. I was in the hospital for two [expletive] days after that."

Wayne's biographer Scott Eyman later said "It was a fish-out-of-water experience" for the actor. "Hockey was just something completely alien to him. This was before television, so he'd probably never even seen a hockey game... As for his skating, he basically gets away with it. He's OK as long as he's moving in a straight line."

== Reception ==
The Christian Science Monitor said it had "sufficient excitement.”

== Lawsuit ==
Madison Square Gardens sued Universal Pictures over the movie claiming the hockey scenes damaged its reputation, by falsely representing that the violent games in the film took place at the Garden. The suit was unsuccessful.

== See also ==
- List of films about ice hockey
- John Wayne filmography
