= Duped (film) =

1925 film directed by J. P. McGowan

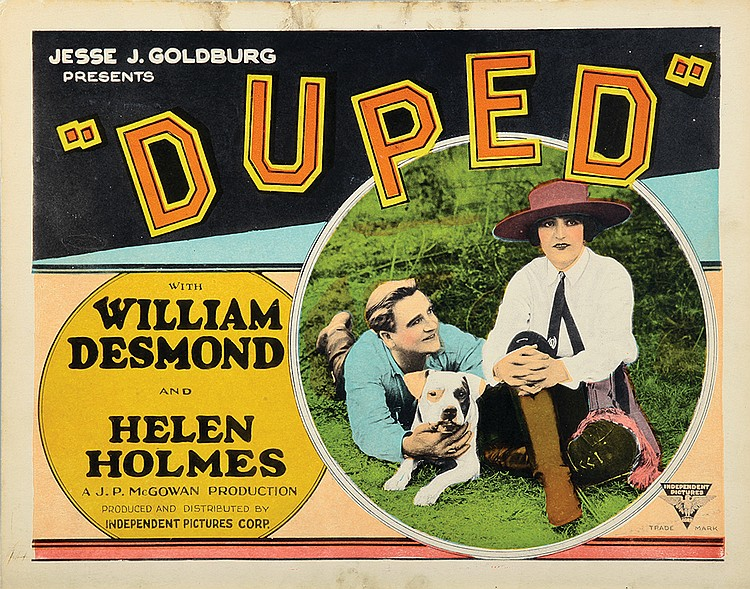
- Directed by: J.P. McGowan
- Written by: John B. Clymer
- Produced by: Jesse J. Goldburg
- Starring: William Desmond; Helen Holmes; Dorothea Wolbert
- Production company: Independent Pictures
- Distributed by: Independent Pictures; Butcher's Film Service (UK)
- Release date: April 1, 1925
- Running time: 50 minutes
- Country: United States
- Languages: Silent; English intertitles

Duped is a 1925 American silent Western film directed by J.P. McGowan and starring William Desmond, Helen Holmes and Dorothea Wolbert. It was released in Britain the following year under the alternative title of Steel and Gold.

== Synopsis ==
A Wall Street investor heads west to California when he discovers that a gold mine he has backed is in danger of being lost due to the corruption of his foreman. Once there he falls in love with Dolores Verdiego and with her assistance he recovers control over his mine.

== Cast ==
- William Desmond as John Morgan
- Helen Holmes as Dolores Verdiego
- J.P. McGowan as 'Hard Rock' Ralston
- Dorothea Wolbert as Sweet Marie
- George Magrill as George Forsyth
- Ford West as Marshal
- James Thompson as A-1

== Bibliography ==
- Connelly, Robert B. The Silents: Silent Feature Films, 1910-36, Volume 40, Issue 2. December Press, 1998.
- Munden, Kenneth White. The American Film Institute Catalog of Motion Pictures Produced in the United States, Part 1. University of California Press, 1997.
