= Across the Plains (1928 film) =

1928 film

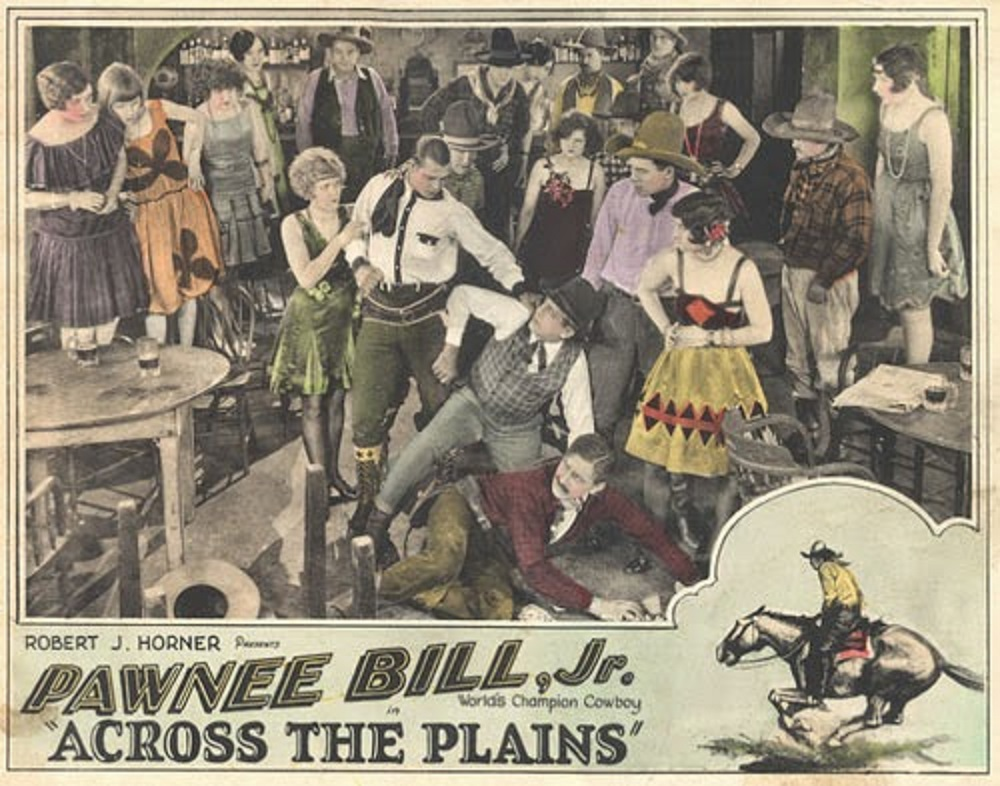
- Directed by: Robert J. Horner
- Written by: Robert J. Horner (story); Royal Brown (titles)
- Produced by: Robert J. Horner
- Starring: Ted Wells
- Cinematography: Jack Draper
- Edited by: William Austin
- Distributed by: Associated Independent Producers
- Release date: June 27, 1928
- Running time: 5 reels
- Country: United States
- Languages: Silent; English intertitles

Across the Plains is a lost 1928 American silent Western film directed by Robert J. Horner and starring Ted Wells.

== Plot ==
A dance-hall girl in a wide-open cowtown falls in love with the tough foreman of a cattle ranch. They plan to marry, but they run into more problems than they counted on.

== Cast ==
- Ted Wells as Jim Blake
- Ione Reed as Helen Williams
- Jack Richardson as Joe Steward
- Martha Barclay as Sally Howard
- William Barrymore as Walla-walla Slim
- Cliff Lyons as Chuck Lang

== Preservation ==
With no holdings located in archives, Across the Plains is considered a lost film.
