= Fighting Fury =

1924 film

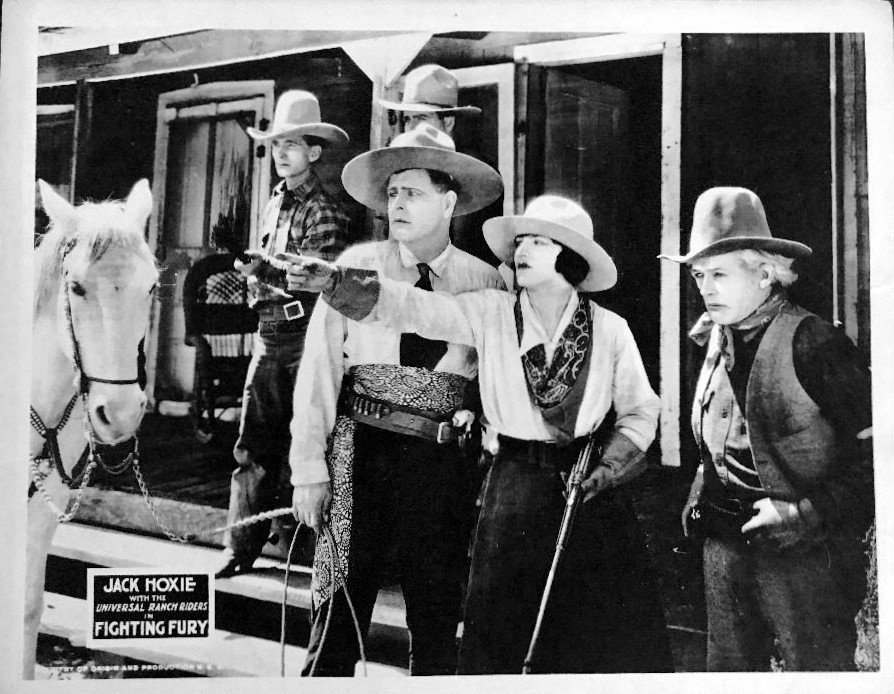
- Lobby card
- Directed by: Clifford Smith
- Written by: Isadore Bernstein
- Based on: "Triple Cross for Danger" by Walter J. Coburn
- Produced by: Carl Laemmle
- Starring: Jack Hoxie; Helen Holmes; Fred Kohler
- Cinematography: Harry Neumann
- Production company: Universal Pictures
- Distributed by: Universal Pictures
- Release date: August 24, 1924
- Running time: 61 minutes
- Country: United States
- Languages: Silent; English intertitles

Fighting Fury is a 1924 American silent Western film directed by Clifford Smith and starring Jack Hoxie, Helen Holmes and Fred Kohler. Hoxie has a dual role portraying a father and son.

== Plot ==
It begins with the brutal murder of Clay Hill Sr. by three ruthless and disfigured ranchers seeking to seize their land or settle a grudge. Their young son, Clay Hill Jr.—a Spanish-American boy—is spared and raised in secret by his loyal Mexican servant, who becomes his guardian and protector.

Years later, the grown Clay Hill Jr. learns the truth about his parents' fate. Fueled by a burning desire for justice, he vows vengeance on the three murderers responsible. As he tracks them down in the lawless West, he navigates dangers, confrontations, and frontier hardships. Romantic interest develops through his encounters, likely involving a heroine figure, adding emotional stakes to his quest amid shootouts, chases, and moral reckonings.

The film builds to climactic showdowns where Clay Jr.'s "fighting fury" is put to the test against the villains, including the notable 'Two-finger' Larkin, blending action, revenge themes, and Western heroism.

== Cast ==
- Jack Hoxie as Clay Hill Sr. / Clay Hill Jr.
- Helen Holmes as June Sanford
- Fred Kohler as 'Two-finger' Larkin
- Duke R. Lee as 'Scarface' Denton
- Bert De Marc as 'Crooked Nose' Evans
- Al J. Jennings as Splain
- Buck Connors as Shorty
- Art Manning as Ike Niber

== Preservation ==
A fragment of Fighting Fury is held by the Library of Congress.

== Bibliography ==
- Darby, William (1991). Masters of Lens and Light: A Checklist of Major Cinematographers and Their Feature Films. Scarecrow Press. ISBN 0-8108-2454-X
