= Ridin' Thunder =

1925 film

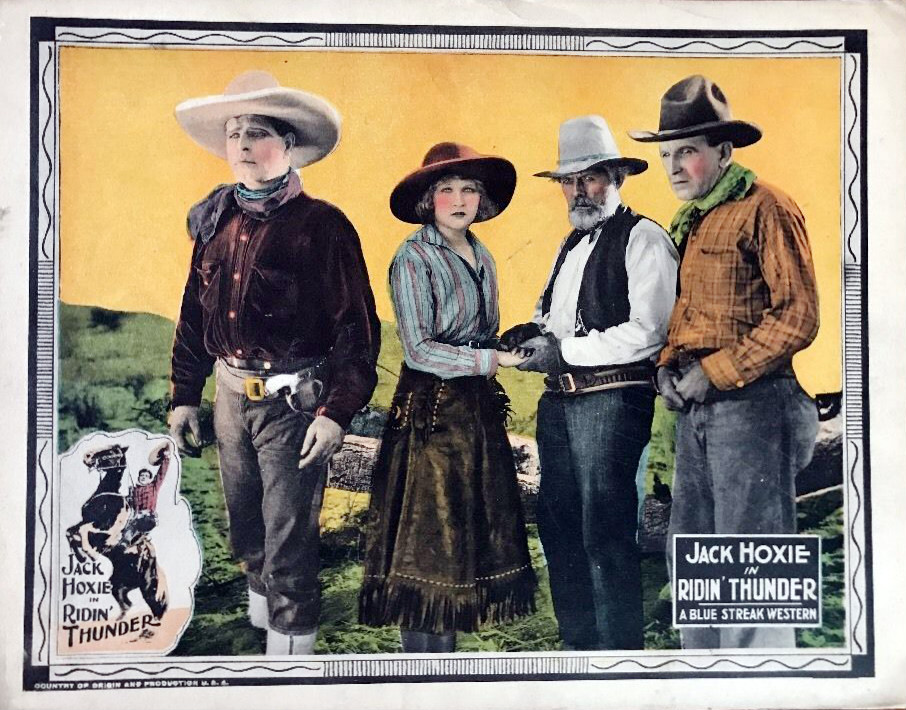
- Lobby card
- Directed by: Clifford Smith
- Written by: Isadore Bernstein; Carl Krusada
- Based on: Jean of the Lazy A by Bertha Muzzy Sinclair
- Starring: Jack Hoxie; Katherine Grant; Francis Ford
- Cinematography: Harry Neumann
- Production company: Universal Pictures
- Distributed by: Universal Pictures
- Release date: June 14, 1925
- Running time: 50 minutes
- Country: United States
- Languages: Silent; English intertitles

Ridin' Thunder is a 1925 American silent Western film directed by Clifford Smith and starring Jack Hoxie, Katherine Grant, and Francis Ford.

== Plot ==
As described in a film magazine review, Frank Douglas creates a situation while shooting at a coyote that crosses his path, leading to his being accused and convicted of murdering a mysterious outlaw. His son Jack loves Jean, the daughter of the murdered outlaw. The tragedy of situations befalls the lovers, and then the real slayer is run down. Jack makes a desperate ride and saves his father from a shameful death. The way is paved for the lovers to marry.

== Cast ==
- Jack Hoxie as Jack Douglas
- Katherine Grant as Jean Croft
- Jack Pratt as Cal Watson
- Francis Ford as Frank Douglas
- Buck Connors as Bill Croft
- Bert De Marc as Art Osgood
- William McCall as Sheriff
- Broderick O'Farrell as Governor
- Al Hoxie as Scout

== Preservation ==
With no holdings located in archives, Ridin' Thunder is considered a lost film.

== Bibliography ==
- Langman, Larry. A Guide to Silent Westerns. Greenwood Publishing Group, 1992. ISBN 0-313-27858-X
