= So This Is Arizona =

1931 film directed by J. P. McGowan

- Directed by: J. P. McGowan
- Written by: Charles Connell; David Kirkland; Joe Lawliss
- Produced by: Robert Connell; R.B. Hooper; David Kirkland
- Starring: Hal Taliaferro; Fred Church; Buzz Barton
- Cinematography: R.B. Hooper
- Edited by: Fred Bain
- Production company: Hooper-Connell Productions
- Distributed by: Big 4 Film
- Release date: October 1, 1931
- Running time: 55 minutes
- Country: United States
- Language: English

So This Is Arizona is a 1931 American pre-Code Western film directed by J. P. McGowan and starring Hal Taliaferro, Fred Church and Buzz Barton.

== Cast ==
- Hal Taliaferro as Bob Ransome
- Don Wilson as Wobbly
- Fred Church as Jake McKeever
- Lorraine LaVal as Josie Gerrard
- Tete Brady as Hattie McKeever
- Buzz Barton as Buzz
- Gus Anderson as Sheriff
- Joe Lawliss as Henchman

== Plot ==
Ranger Bob Ransome encounters conflict when he must arrest a man who is the brother of Ransome's fiancée, Hattie. The arrest causes a breakup with Hattie, but Ransome is helped by a ranch heiress who loves him.

== Bibliography ==
- Michael R. Pitts. Poverty Row Studios, 1929–1940: An Illustrated History of 55 Independent Film Companies, with a Filmography for Each. McFarland & Company, 2005.
