= The Scrappin' Kid =

1926 film

- Directed by: Clifford Smith
- Written by: Richard Schayer
- Produced by: Carl Laemmle
- Starring: Art Acord; Velma Connor; Jimmy Boudwin
- Cinematography: William Nobles
- Production company: Universal Pictures
- Distributed by: Universal Pictures
- Release date: June 20, 1926
- Running time: 56 minutes
- Country: United States
- Language: Silent (English intertitles)

The Scrappin' Kid is a 1926 American silent Western film directed by Clifford Smith and starring Art Acord, Velma Connor, and Jimmy Boudwin.

== Plot ==
As described in a review in a film magazine, Bill Bradley (Acord) appears as a chap who lives along on a little ranch. During a forest fire he saves a young woman and her small brother and sister. Mail bandits have robbed a train hide in the hills, and finally venture forth and make Bill a prisoner. He escapes and sends his dog to the sheriff. The bandits capture the woman and take her to their lair. Bill pursues and fights them, and the sheriff appears and takes them into custody. Bill wins the affection of the young woman and uses the government reward from the capture of the gang to pay off the mortgage on his ranch.

== Cast ==
- Art Acord as Bill Bradley
- Velma Connor as Betty Brent
- Jimmy Boudwin as Mike Brent
- C.E. Anderson as Hank Prince
- Jess Deffenbach as Pete Hendricks
- Hank Bell as Slim Hawks
- Edmund Cobb as Cliff Barrowes
- Dudley Hendricks as Sheriff Bolton

== Bibliography ==
- Munden, Kenneth White. The American Film Institute Catalog of Motion Pictures Produced in the United States, Part 1. University of California Press, 1997.
