= Blue Streak O'Neil =

1926 film

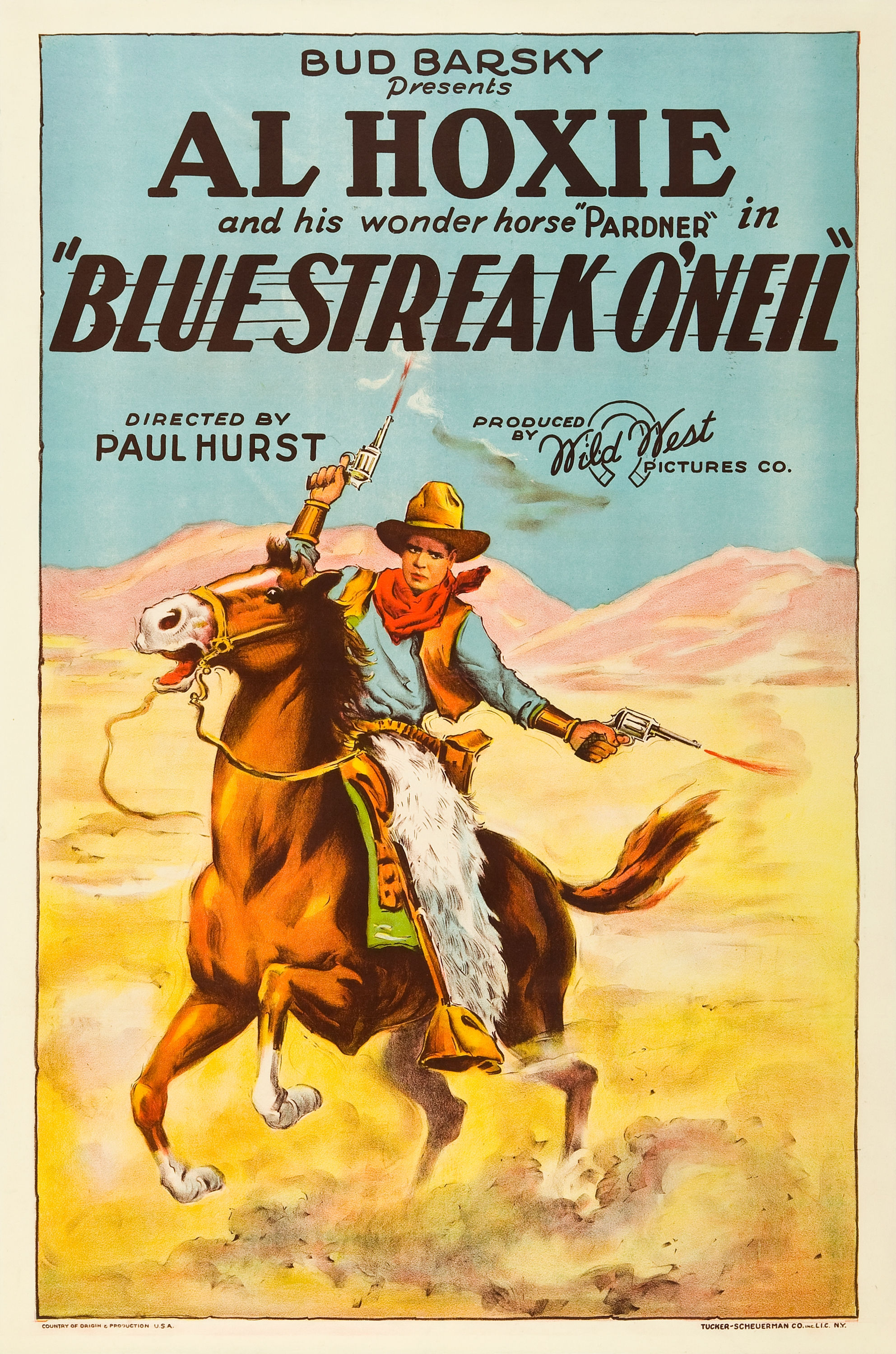
- Directed by: Paul Hurst
- Produced by: Bud Barsky
- Starring: Al Hoxie; Ione Reed; Cliff Lyons
- Cinematography: Frank Cotner
- Production company: Wild West Pictures
- Distributed by: Bud Barsky Corporation
- Release date: December 15, 1926
- Running time: 50 minutes
- Country: United States
- Languages: Silent; English intertitles

Blue Streak O'Neil is a 1926 American silent Western film directed by Paul Hurst and starring Al Hoxie, Ione Reed and Cliff Lyons.

Location shooting took place at Sequoia National Park in California.

== Cast ==
- Al Hoxie as Blue Streak O'Neil
- Pardner the Horse as O'Neil's Horse
- Ione Reed
- Alfred Hewston
- Cliff Lyons
- Paul Hurst

== Preservation ==
With no holdings located in archives, Blue Streak O'Neil is considered a lost film.
