= The Apostle of Vengeance =

1916 film by William S. Hart, Clifford Smith

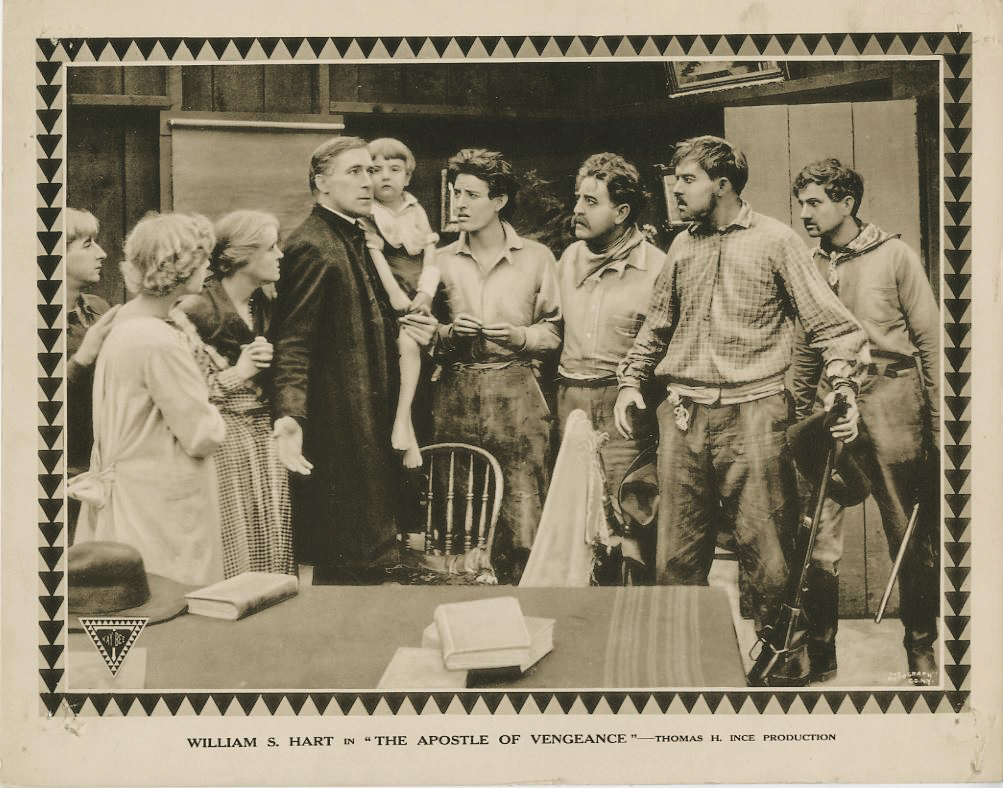
- Lobby card
- Directed by: Clifford Smith
- Written by: Monte M. Katterjohn
- Produced by: Thomas H. Ince
- Starring: William S. Hart; Nona Thomas; John Gilbert
- Cinematography: Joseph H. August
- Production company: Kay-Bee Pictures
- Distributed by: Triangle Distributing
- Release date: July 25, 1916
- Running time: 50 minutes
- Country: United States
- Language: Silent (English intertitles)

The Apostle of Vengeance is a 1916 American silent drama film directed by Clifford Smith and starring William S. Hart, Nona Thomas and John Gilbert. A Kentucky-born preacher returns home from Vermont in order to settle a feud between two warring families.

== Cast ==
- William S. Hart as David Hudson
- Nona Thomas as Mary McCoy
- Joseph J. Dowling as Tom McCoy
- Fanny Midgley as "Marm" Hudson
- John Gilbert as Willie Hudson
- Marvel Stafford as Elsie Hudson
- Gertrude Claire

== Preservation ==
With no prints of The Apostle of Vengeance located in any film archives, it is considered a lost film.

== Bibliography ==
- Donald W. McCaffrey & Christopher P. Jacobs. Guide to the Silent Years of American Cinema. Greenwood Publishing, 1999. ISBN 0-313-30345-2
