= Prince of the Saddle =

1926 film

- Produced by: Fred J. Balshofer
- Starring: Fred Church
- Release date: November 11, 1926
- Running time: 5 reels
- Country: United States
- Language: Silent/English titles

Prince of the Saddle is a lost 1926 American silent Western film starring Fred Church and Pauline Curley.

== Cast ==
- Fred Church
- Pauline Curley
- William Barrymore as Boris Bullock aka Kit Carson
