= George Arthur Durlam =

American screenwriter and film producer

- Born: March 12, 1895; New York City, New York, United States
- Died: November 25, 1952 (aged 57); Los Angeles County, California, United States
- Occupations: Producer, Writer, Director
- Years active: 1925–1942 (film)

George Arthur Durlam (1895–1952) was an American screenwriter and film producer. He also directed several short documentary films as well as the 1931 western Two Fisted Justice. Much of his work took place on Poverty Row.

== Selected filmography ==
- Ace of Clubs (1925)
- Red Blood (1925)
- Riding Romance (1925)
- Code of Honor (1930)
- Beyond the Law (1930)
- The Canyon of Missing Men (1930)
- Call of the Desert (1930)
- Under Texas Skies (1930)
- In Line of Duty (1931)
- Oklahoma Jim (1931)
- The Riding Kid (1931)
- Near the Trail's End (1931)
- Riders of the North (1931)
- Partners of the Trail (1931)
- The Montana Kid (1931)
- Two Fisted Justice (1931)
- The Man from Death Valley (1931)
- South of Santa Fe (1932)
- Ghost City (1932)
- Paradise Valley (1934)
- Captured in Chinatown (1935)
- Custer's Last Stand (1936)
- Aces and Eights (1936)
- Lightnin' Bill Carson (1936)
- The Great Adventures of Wild Bill Hickok (1938)
- Frontier Crusader (1940)
- Swamp Woman (1941)
- Boot Hill Bandits (1942)

== Bibliography ==
- Pitts, Michael R. Poverty Row Studios, 1929–1940: An Illustrated History of 55 Independent Film Companies, with a Filmography for Each. McFarland & Company, 2005.
