= Al Hoxie =

American actor

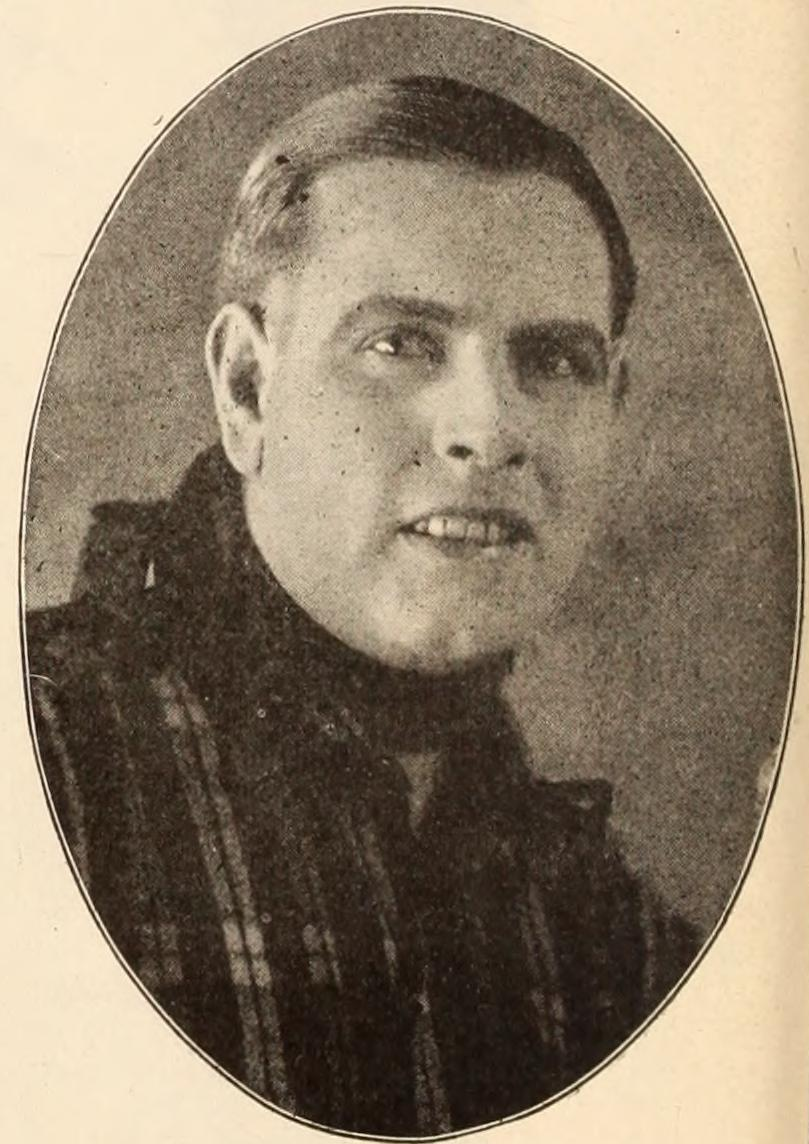
- Hoxie in 1925
- Born: October 7, 1901; Nezperce, Idaho, United States
- Died: April 6, 1982 (aged 80); Redlands, California, United States
- Occupation: Actor
- Years active: 1919–1934 (film)

Alton "Al" Hoxie (October 7, 1901 – April 6, 1982) was an American film actor. The younger brother of Jack Hoxie, he starred in a number of silent westerns.

== Life and career ==
Alton Hoxie was born on October 7, 1901 in Nezperce, Idaho. He grew up on a ranch; a background he found invaluable when later appearing in American Western films. In 1918 he relocated to Hollywood, California at the urging of hils older brother, Jack Hoxie, who felt Al could make a considerable amount of money as a trick rider on camera in stunts with horses. His first film was in Lightning Bryce (1919), which starred his brother, in which he worked as a stuntman. He appeared in 28 films from 1925-1928.

After his movie career ended, Hoxie worked first as a streetcar operator in Los Angeles before joining the staff of the California Department of Forestry. He then became a police officer in Anaheim, California where he achieved the rank of sergeant. After working as a cop for 15 years, he became the chief of security at Patton State Hospital from 1961-1968. There he met his third wife, Marie. He died on April 6, 1982 in Redlands, California at the age of 80.

== Selected filmography ==
- Ruth of the Rockies' (1920)
- Thunderbolt Jack (1920)
- The Queen of Sheba (1921)
- The Red Warning (1923)
- The Hunchback of Notre Dame (1923)
- The Back Trail (1924)
- Days of '49 (1924)
- Ace of Clubs (1925)
- Red Blood (1925)
- Riding Romance (1925)
- Ridin' Thunder (1925)
- Unseen Enemies (1925)
- The Texas Terror (1925)
- The Road Agent (1925)
- Tumbleweeds (1925)
- Blue Streak O'Neil (1926)
- The Lost Trail (1926)
- Rider of the Law (1927)
- His Last Bullet (1928)
- The White Outlaw (1929)

== Bibliography ==
- Katchmer, George A. A Biographical Dictionary of Silent Film Western Actors and Actresses. McFarland, 2015.
