= An Oklahoma Cowboy =

1929 film directed by J.P. McGowan

- Directed by: J.P. McGowan
- Written by: J.P. McGowan
- Produced by: William T. Lackey; J. Charles Davis
- Starring: Art Acord; Dorothy Vernon
- Cinematography: Paul H. Allen
- Production company: J. Charles Davis Productions
- Distributed by: Davis Distributing Division
- Release date: May 20, 1929
- Running time: 50 minutes
- Country: United States
- Languages: Silent; English intertitles

An Oklahoma Cowboy is a 1929 American silent Western film directed by J.P. McGowan and starring Art Acord and Dorothy Vernon.

== Cast ==
- Art Acord
- Ione Reed
- J.P. McGowan
- Dorothy Vernon
- Slim Whitaker
- Bobby Dunn
- Cliff Lyons

== Bibliography ==
- Robert B. Connelly. The Silents: Silent Feature Films, 1910-36, Volume 40, Issue 2. December Press, 1998.
