= Chasing Trouble (1926 film) =

1926 film

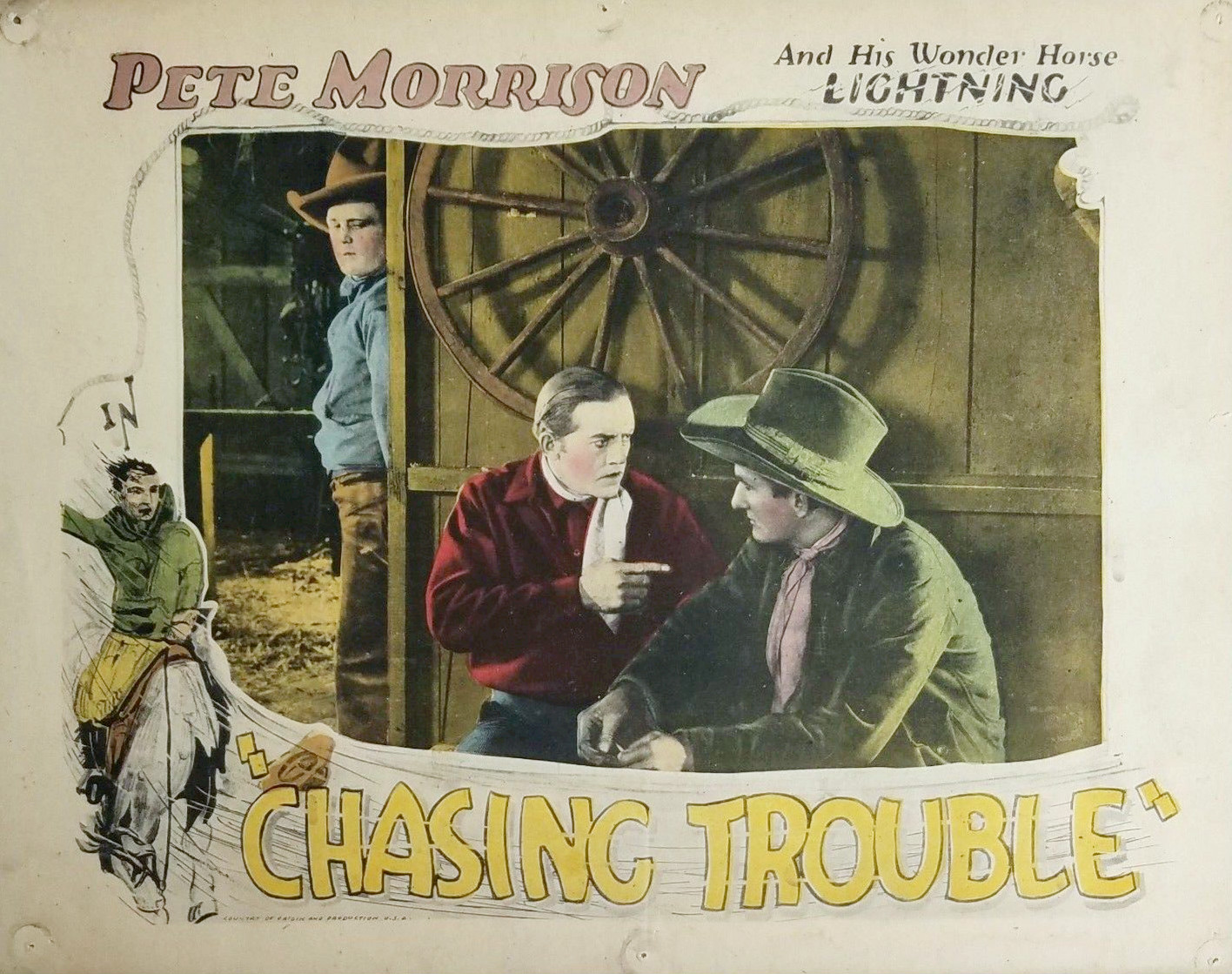
- Directed by: Milburn Morante
- Written by: Frank S. Beresford
- Produced by: Carl Laemmle
- Starring: Pete Morrison; Ione Reed; Tom London
- Cinematography: Jack Young
- Production company: Universal Pictures
- Distributed by: Universal Pictures
- Release date: May 2, 1926
- Running time: 50 minutes
- Country: United States
- Languages: Silent; English intertitles

Chasing Trouble is a 1926 American silent Western film directed by Milburn Morante and starring Pete Morrison, Ione Reed and Tom London.

== Cast ==
- Pete Morrison as Ballard
- Ione Reed as Emily Gregg
- Tom London as Jerome Garrett
- Roy Watson as Judge Gregg
- Frances Friel as Sal Karney
- Milton J. Fahrney as Sheriff
- Jewel Bennett as Carnegie McCue
- J.A. Wiley as Stech
- Al Richmond as Jim O'Reilly
- Skeeter Bill Robbins as Munn
- Lilly Harris as Ma Flaherty
- Fred Gamble as Bartender

== Preservation ==
With no holdings located in archives, Chasing Trouble is considered a lost film.
