= Mistaken Orders =

1925 film directed by J. P. McGowan

- Directed by: J. P. McGowan
- Produced by: Morris R. Schlank Larry Wheeler; W. Ray Johnston
- Starring: Helen Holmes
- Distributed by: Anchor Film Distributors; Enterprise Distributing Corp. Rayart Pictures; Butcher's Film Service (UK)
- Release date: June 1925
- Running time: 5 reels
- Country: United States
- Language: Silent..English intertitles

Mistaken Orders is a 1925 American silent action adventure film directed by J. P. McGowan. It starred Helen Holmes and Henry A. Barrows.

Prints are held by the Library of Congress, Academy Film Archive and BFI National Film and Television Archive.

== Cast ==
- Helen Holmes - Helen Barton
- Jack Perrin - Tom Lawson
- Henry A. Barrows - General Barton
- Hal Walters - Vince Barton
- Harry Tenbrook - Tony Sharkey
- Cecil Kellogg - The Night Operator
- Mack V. Wright - The Day Agent
- Arthur Millett - Tom Lawson's Father
- Alice Belcher - Jane Moriarty
