= The Broken Mask =

1928 film

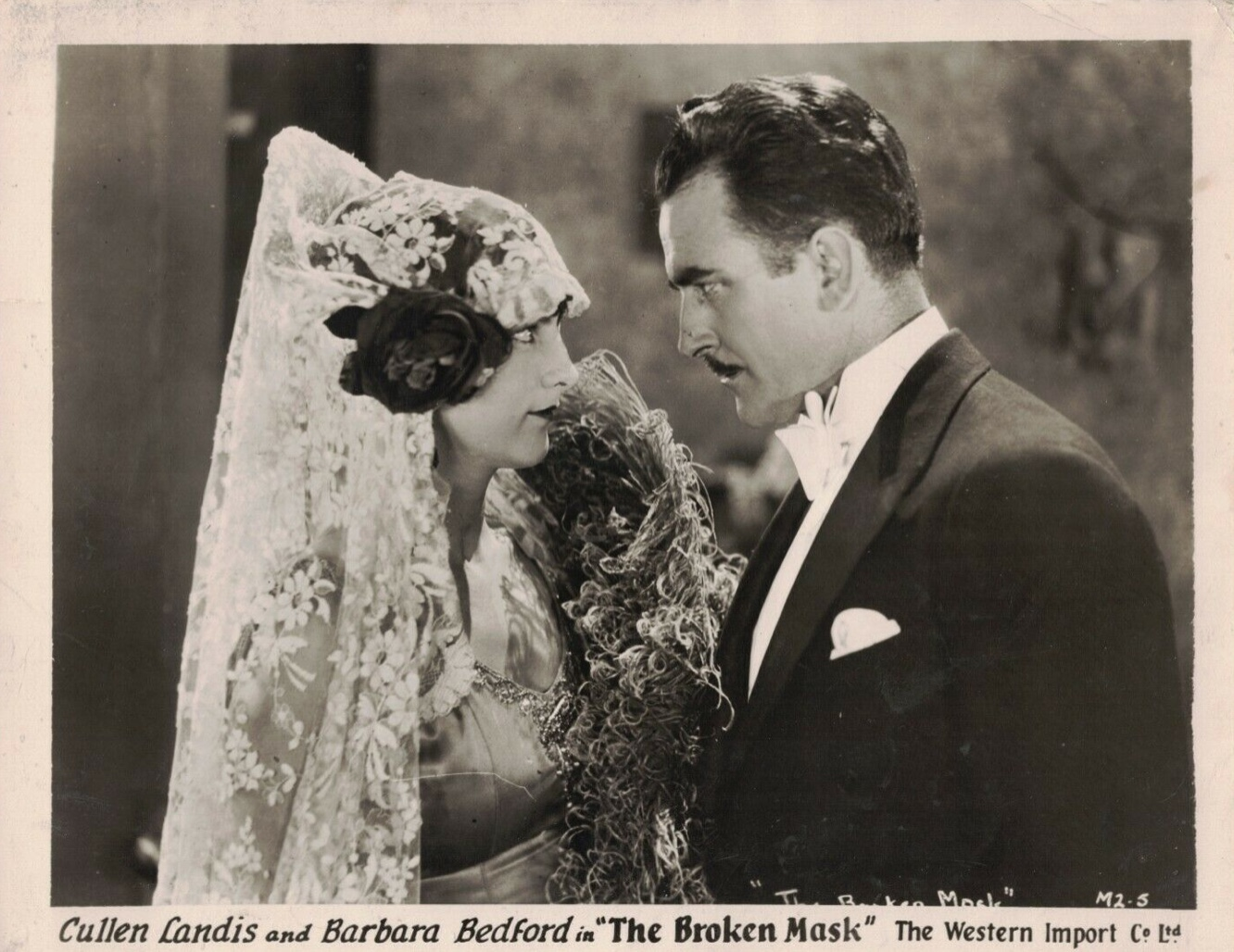
- Directed by: James P. Hogan
- Written by: De Leon Anthony; Adele Buffington; Frank Fenton
- Produced by: Morris R. Schlank
- Starring: Cullen Landis; Barbara Bedford; Wheeler Oakman
- Cinematography: Edward Gheller
- Edited by: Roy Eiler
- Production company: Morris R. Schlank Productions
- Distributed by: Anchor Film Distributors
- Release date: March 16, 1928
- Running time: 60 minutes
- Country: United States
- Languages: Silent; English intertitles

The Broken Mask is a 1928 American silent drama film directed by James P. Hogan and starring Cullen Landis, Barbara Bedford and Wheeler Oakman. It was made by the independent Morris R. Schlank's production company.

== Synopsis ==
Pertio, an Argentine dancer in New Orleans, falls in love with fellow performer Caricia. She persuades him to have his facial scars fixed by a plastic surgeon and the two team up both professionally and romantically. However the jealous doctor now desires Caricia and sets out to split them up.

== Cast ==
- Cullen Landis as Pertio
- Barbara Bedford as Caricia
- William V. Mong as Santo Bendito
- Wheeler Oakman as Dr. Gordon White
- James A. Marcus as Maurice Armato
- Philippe De Lacy as Young Pertio
- Ina Anson as Delores
- Nanci Price as Young Caricia
- Pat Harmon as Revolutionary

== Reception ==
A review in Variety found "little to recommend", but The Film Daily was more positive.

Photoplay's gave the film a positive review, writing, "Despite the theme's primitive ugliness, it is a colorful, imaginative picture with enough suspense to keep you gasping." The review also praised the performances of leads Landis and Bedford.

The National Board of Review magazine, in 1942, described the film as "An interesting romance," and "A story of deep love and jealousy."

== Bibliography ==
- Connelly, Robert B. The Silents: Silent Feature Films, 1910-36, Volume 40, Issue 2. December Press, 1998.
- Munden, Kenneth White. The American Film Institute Catalog of Motion Pictures Produced in the United States, Part 1. University of California Press, 1997.
