= Bobby Dunn =

American actor and comedian (1890–1937)

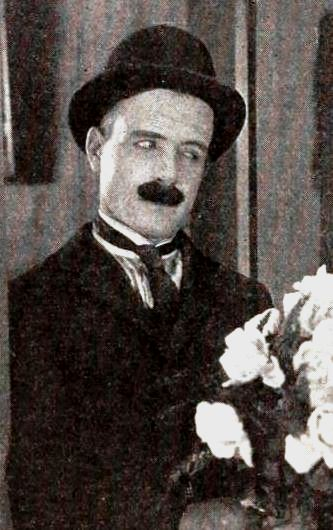
- Dunn in 1921
- Born: Robert P. Dunn; August 28, 1890; Milwaukee, Wisconsin, U.S.
- Died: March 24, 1937 (aged 46); Hollywood, California, U.S.
- Resting place: Hollywood Forever Cemetery
- Occupations: Actor, comedian
- Years active: 1912–1937

Robert P. Dunn (August 28, 1890 – March 24, 1937) was a comic actor who was one of the original Keystone Cops in Hoffmeyer's Legacy.

== Early years ==
Dunn was born in Milwaukee, Wisconsin, to Richard P. and Melissa Dunn, and attended St. Johns Military Academy. He was a world-champion high-diver with Dr. Carver's diving horses.

== Career ==
Dunn started his film career at Keystone Studios with Mack Sennett and worked as a comedian and stuntman for a variety of other film studios as well. He lost many of his teeth and suffered other injuries performing stunts as well, including the loss of one of his eyes when he fell into a barrel of water and his eye was irreparably damaged by a floating matchstick. The glass eye he wore after that accident gave him a somewhat "cross-eyed" appearance, although that effect "served only to empower his comedic career." Later, during the 1920s and 1930s, he performed as a supporting player for many of the film industry's leading comedians, such as Harold Lloyd, W. C. Fields, Charley Chase, the Marx Brothers, and Laurel and Hardy.

== Death ==
Dunn died of a heart attack on March 24, 1937, in Hollywood, California, at the age of 46. His grave site is at Hollywood Forever Cemetery in Los Angeles.

== Selected filmography ==
A Hash House Fraud (1915)

- Hoffmeyer's Legacy (1912, Short) - Keystone Kop (uncredited)
- In and Out (1914, Short)
- A Hash House Fraud (1915, Short)
- Hogan, the Porter (1915, Short) - Desk Clerk
- Hogan's Mussy Job (1915, Short) - Apartment House Manager
- Fatty's New Role (1915, Short) - Grocer (uncredited)
- Hogan's Romance Upset (1915, Short) - Weary Willie
- Hogan's Aristocratic Dream (1915, Short) - Hogan's Valet
- Hogan Out West (1915, Short) - Hogan's Rival
- A Versatile Villain (1915, Short)
- The Little Teacher (1915, Short) - 3rd Unruly Student
- Those Bitter Sweets (1915, Short)
- Fatty's Tintype Tangle (1915, Short) - Laughing Man (uncredited)
- A Game Old Knight (1915, Short)
- Fickle Fatty's Fall (1915, Short) - Man in Shower
- Hogan's Wild Oats (1915, Short) - Theatre Patron (uncredited)
- His Auto Ruination (1916, Short) - The Janitor
- His Pride and Shame (1916, Short) - Red Dugan
- By Stork Delivery (1916, Short) - The Janitor
- His Last Laugh (1916, Short) - The Holdup Man
- His Bread and Butter (1916, Short) - The Head Waiter
- Bath Tub Perils (1916, Short) - Bathing Suited Guest in Room (uncredited)
- Bubbles of Trouble (1916, Short) - The True Love's Pal
- The Winning Punch (1916, Short) - Slim's Rival
- His Busted Trust (1916, Short) - The Sculptor
- Villa of the Movies (1917, Short) - The Landlord
- Secrets of a Beauty Parlor (1917, Short)
- A Maiden's Trust (1917, Short) - Minor Role (uncredited)
- Two Crooks (1917, Short) - 2nd Crook
- Are Waitresses Safe? (1917, Short) - Party Guest (uncredited)
- Hero for a Minute (1917, Short) - Kid Cameraflage
- Barbarous Plots (1918, Short)
- A Flyer in Folly (1918, Short) - Jasper Junk
- A High Diver's Last Kiss (1918, Short)
- East Lynne with Variations (1919, Short) - Minor Role (uncredited)
- Lions and Ladies (1919, Short)
- Yankee Doodle in Berlin (1919) - Minor Role (uncredited)
- His Naughty Wife (1919, Short)
- Skirts (1921)
- His Fiery Beat (1921, Short)
- Be Reasonable (1921, Short) - The Girl's Father
- Oh, Mabel Behave (1922) - Inn Patron (uncredited)
- Fresh Paint (1922, Short)
- Hands Up (1922, Short)
- All Wrong (1922, Short) - The Boob
- Give Me Air (1922, Short)
- The Fast Mailman (1922)
- Our Alley (1923)
- Ain't Love Awful? (1923, Short)
- Hot Foot (1923, Short)
- Oh! Shoot (1923, Short)
- No Danger (1923, Short)
- My Error (1923, Short)
- All Is Lost (1923, Short)
- The Rivals (1923, Short) - Bobby
- Why Wait? (1924, Short)
- This Way Out (1924, Short)
- Easy Work (1924, Short)
- Easy Money (1924, Short)
- A Fake Alarm (1924, Short)
- Unmounted Policemen (1924, Short)
- Keep Healthy (1924, Short)
- Ship Ahoy! (1924, Short)
- Green Grocers (1924, Short)
- Politics (1924, Short)
- Flapper Fever (1924, Short)
- My Little Brother (1924, Short)
- Case Dismissed (1924, Short)
- Miners Over 21 (1924, Short)
- The Cry Baby (1924, Short)
- I'm Cured (1924, Short)
- Hello, 'Frisco (1924, Short) - Bobby
- The Plumber's Helper (1924, Short)
- The General Store (1924, Short)
- Tee for Two (1925, Short) - Subway Guard
- Whispering Whiskers (1926, Short) - Minor Role (uncredited)
- The Thrill Hunter (1926) - Ferdie
- Wandering Willies (1926, Short) - Waiter
- Alice Be Good (1926, Short) - Flirty Dancer
- When the Wife's Away (1926)
- Masked Mamas (1926, Short) - Guest in Lobby / Drunk on Street (uncredited)
- The Divorce Dodger (1926, Short) - Apartment Tenant
- A Dozen Socks (1927, Short) - Trainer
- Why Girls Love Sailors (1927, Short) - Bemused Sailor (uncredited)
- Love in a Police Station (1927, Short) - Cop
- The Upland Rider (1928) - Shorty
- Speedy (1928) - Tough (uncredited)
- The Barker (1928) - Hamburger Concessionaire (uncredited)
- The Power of the Press (1928) - Taxicab Driver (uncredited)
- Taxi Spooks (1929, Short)
- The Royal Rider (1929) - Wild West Show Member
- An Oklahoma Cowboy (1929)
- Captain Cowboy (1929)
- The Wagon Master (1929) - Buckeye Pete
- Riders of the Storm (1929)
- Bacon Grabbers (1929, Short)
- Oh, Yeah! (1929) - Railroad Man at Bonfire (uncredited)
- The Racketeer (1929) - The Rat
- The Trespasser (1929) - Milkman (uncredited)
- Code of the West (1929) - Shorty Gordon
- Neath Western Skies (1929) - Percival Givens
- The Parting of the Trails (1930) - 'Restless' Roberts
- Parade of the West (1930) - Shorty
- Loose Ankles (1930) - Butler (uncredited)
- Call of the Desert (1930) - Hardrock
- The Fighting Legion (1930) - Waiter (uncredited)
- Le joueur de golf (1930) - (uncredited)
- Half-Pint Polly (1930, Short) - Spud
- The Canyon of Missing Men (1930) - Gimpy Lamb
- America or Bust (1930, Short)
- Canyon Hawks (1930) - Shorty
- Trails of Danger (1930) - Deputy Shorty
- The Lottery Bride (1930) - Miner (uncredited)
- Phantom of the Desert (1930) - Short Cowhand (uncredited)
- Breed of the West (1930) - Shorty
- Reducing (1931) - Train Station Extra (uncredited)
- Hell's Valley (1931) - Shorty, Texas Ranger
- Sweepstakes (1931) - Bidder at Horse Auction (uncredited)
- Pardon Us (1931) - Insurgent Convict (uncredited)
- Monkey Business (1931) - Gangster (uncredited)
- Side Show (1931) - Little Man (uncredited)
- The Phantom (1931) - Shorty - the Chauffeur
- Bad Company (1931) - Hood Shot on Balcony (uncredited)
- Half Holiday (1931, Short) - Ice Cream Man (uncredited)
- The Last Ride (1931) - Dink
- Taxi! (1932) - Cab Driver at Meeting (uncredited)
- Lady! Please! (1932, Short) - Janitor (uncredited)
- The Flirty Sleepwalker (1932, Short) - Caddy Master
- Million Dollar Legs (1932) - Klopstokian Athlete (uncredited)
- Honeymoon Beach (1932, Short) - Billy's Butler
- The Dentist (1932, Short) - Dentist's Caddy (uncredited)
- Hypnotized (1932) - Sailor (uncredited)
- Terror Aboard (1933) - Cross-eyed Sailor
- Me and My Pal (1933, Short) - Telegram Messenger (uncredited)
- Don't Bet on Love (1933) - Cross-Eyed Bettor (uncredited)
- The Bowery (1933) - Cockeyed Violinist (uncredited)
- Son of a Sailor (1933) - Sailor (uncredited)
- You Can't Buy Everything (1934) - News Vendor (uncredited)
- Wheels of Destiny (1934) - Wagon Driver (uncredited)
- Twisted Rails (1934) - Bolivar's Henchman (uncredited)
- Broadway Bill (1934) - (uncredited)
- Tit for Tat (1935, Short) - Customer (uncredited)
- One More Spring (1935) - Bum (uncredited)
- One Run Elmer (1935, Short) - Pitcher (uncredited)
- George White's 1935 Scandals (1935) - Cross-Eyed Man (uncredited)
- The Roaring West (1935) - Freighter (uncredited)
- Bonnie Scotland (1935) - Native Henchman / Man Dispensing Flyers (uncredited)
- Redheads on Parade (1935) - Grip (uncredited)
- Here Comes Cookie (1935) - Old Crony (uncredited)
- The Bohemian Girl (1936) - Cockeyed Bartender (uncredited)
- The Lucky Corner (1936, Short) - 'Poisoned' customer
- Mr. Deeds Goes to Town (1936) - Minor Role (uncredited)
- Arbor Day (1936, Short) - Crowd Extra
- Neighborhood House (1936) - Irate Moviegoer (uncredited)
- Our Relations (1936) - Messenger Boy (uncredited)
- Way Out West (1937) - Barfly (uncredited)
- Slave Ship (1937) - Crew Member (uncredited)
- Religious Racketeers (1938) - Holy Man (uncredited) (final film role)
