= West of the Rockies (film) =

1929 film

- Directed by: Horace B. Carpenter
- Written by: Philip Schuyler
- Starring: Art Mix; Horace B. Carpenter; George Edward Brown
- Production company: J. Charles Davis Productions
- Distributed by: State Rights
- Release date: December 15, 1929 (US)
- Running time: 63 minutes
- Country: United States
- Language: English

West of the Rockies is a 1929 American silent Western film directed by Horace B. Carpenter, starring Art Mix, Horace B. Carpenter, and George Edward Brown.

== Cast ==
- Art Mix as Bob Strong
- Horace B. Carpenter as Hair-Trigger Strong
- George Edward Brown as George
- Cliff Lyons as Snakey Rogers
- Bud Osborne as Juan Escobar
- Fontaine La Rue as Celia de la Costa
- Inez Gomez as Rosita
- Ione Reed as Beth Lee
- Alfred Hewston as Tex
- Pete Crawford as Sheriff
- Antone Sanchez as Pedro
