= Fred Church (actor) =

American actor

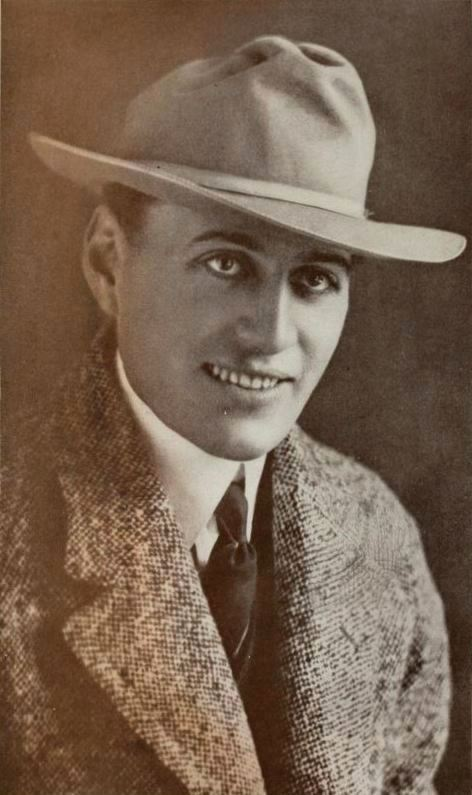
- Church in 1914
- Born: October 17, 1889; Boone, Iowa, United States
- Died: January 7, 1983 (aged 93); Blythe, California, United States
- Occupation: Actor
- Years active: 1908–1935

Fred Rosewell Church (October 17, 1889 – January 7, 1983) was an American actor of the silent era.

== Career ==
After entering vaudeville when he was a boy, Church became part of a double act that spent two years on the circuit. After touring the U.S. in vaudeville, he acted in repertory theater in the central Western United States, including the Selig Company in Chicago.

In 1908, Church joined Gilbert M. 'Broncho Billy' Anderson in Western films for the latter's Essanay Studios. He appeared in more than 200 films between 1908 and 1935. From 1928 to 1930, he made six films billed as Montana Bill.

Church was born in Boone, Iowa (another source says Quebec, Canada), and died in Blythe, California, near his home in Quartzsite, Arizona, from congestive heart failure

== Selected filmography ==
- Across the Plains (1911)
- Alkali Ike's Auto (1911)
- The Secret of the Swamp (1916)
- It Happened in Honolulu (1916)
- Southern Justice (1917)
- Madame Du Barry (1917)
- The Son-of-a-Gun (1919)
- Chalk Marks (1924)
- The Lost Express (1925)
- Prince of the Saddle (1926)
- The Vanishing West (1928)
- Trails of Treachery (1928)
- The Riding Kid (1931)
- So This Is Arizona (1931)
- Wild West Whoopee (1931)
- Flying Lariats (1931)
- Riders of the Cactus (1931)
