= Call of the Desert =

1930 film directed by J. P. McGowan

- Directed by: J. P. McGowan
- Written by: Sally Winters
- Produced by: George Arthur Durlam
- Starring: Tom Tyler; Sheila Bromley; Bud Osborne
- Cinematography: Hap Depew
- Edited by: Arthur A. Brooks
- Production company: G. A. Durlam Productions
- Distributed by: Syndicate Film Exchange
- Release date: March 1, 1930
- Running time: 50 minutes
- Country: United States
- Languages: Silent; English intertitles

Call of the Desert is a 1930 American silent Western film directed by J. P. McGowan and starring Tom Tyler, Sheila Bromley and Bud Osborne. Some versions of the film were released with added sound effects.

== Cast ==
- Tom Tyler as Rex Carson
- Sheila Bromley as Jean Walker
- Bud Osborne as Tod Walker
- Cliff Lyons as Nate Thomas
- Bobby Dunn as Hardrock

== Bibliography ==
- Pitts, Michael R. Poverty Row Studios, 1929–1940. McFarland & Company, 2005.
