= Queen of the Chorus =

1928 film

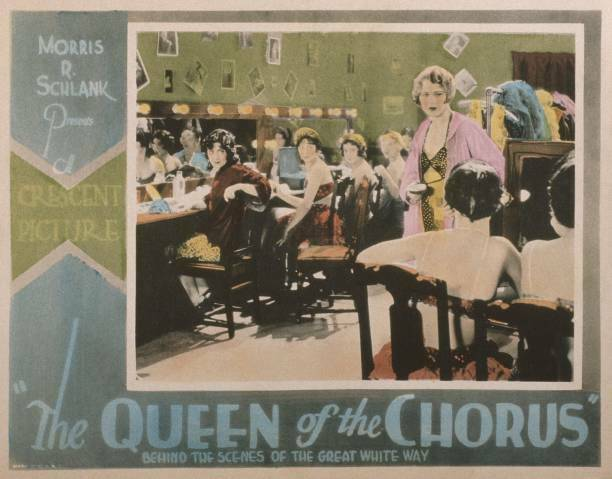
- Directed by: Charles J. Hunt
- Written by: Adele Buffington
- Produced by: Morris R. Schlank
- Starring: Virginia Brown Faire; Rex Lease; Betty Francisco
- Cinematography: Robert E. Cline
- Production company: Morris R. Schlank Productions
- Distributed by: Anchor Film Distributors
- Release date: March 5, 1928
- Running time: 78 minutes
- Country: United States
- Languages: Silent; English intertitles

Queen of the Chorus is a 1928 American silent drama film directed by Charles J. Hunt and starring Virginia Brown Faire, Rex Lease and Betty Francisco. It was made by the independent producer Morris R. Schlank.

== Synopsis ==
Broadway chorus girl Queenie falls in love with a man who pretends to be a millionaire but is actually impersonating his boss. When his employer returns from Europe, he in turn tries to win over Queenie by showering her with gifts.

== Cast ==
- Virginia Brown Faire as 'Queenie' Dale
- Rex Lease as Billy Cooke
- Lloyd Whitlock as Gordon Trent
- Betty Francisco as Flossie de Vere
- Harriet Hammond as Mrs. Gordon Trent
- Charles Hill Mailes as Rufus Van Der Layden
- Crauford Kent as Spencer Steele

== Bibliography ==
- Connelly, Robert B. The Silents: Silent Feature Films, 1910-36, Volume 40, Issue 2. December Press, 1998.
- Munden, Kenneth White. The American Film Institute Catalog of Motion Pictures Produced in the United States, Part 1. University of California Press, 1997.
