= Trails of Treachery =

1928 film

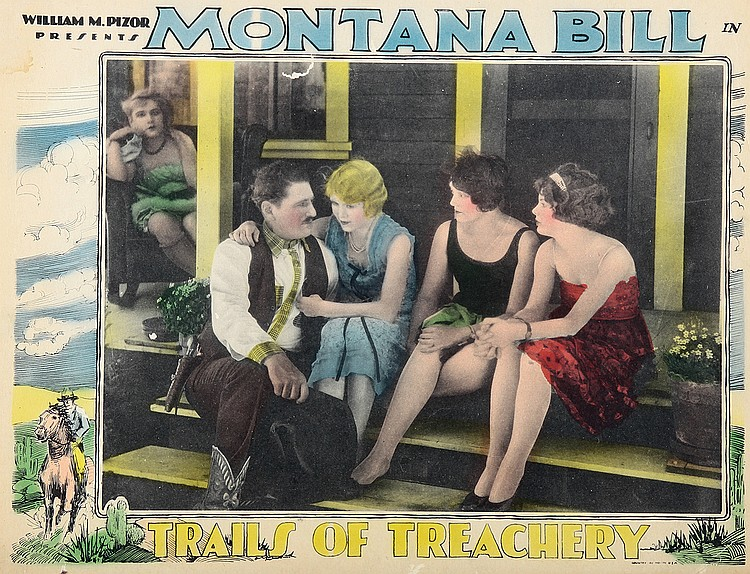
- Directed by: Robert J. Horner
- Written by: Robert J. Horner
- Produced by: William M. Pizor
- Starring: Fred Church; Ione Reed
- Cinematography: Jack Draper
- Edited by: Robert J. Horner
- Production company: William M. Pizor Productions
- Distributed by: William M. Pizor Productions
- Release date: October 24, 1928
- Running time: 50 minutes
- Country: United States
- Languages: Silent; English intertitles

Trails of Treachery is a 1928 American silent Western film directed by Robert J. Horner and starring Fred Church and Ione Reed.

== Cast ==
- Fred Church
- Ione Reed
- Margaret Earl
- Elizabeth Shafer
- Kelly Gafford

== Bibliography ==
- Langman, Larry. A Guide to Silent Westerns. Greenwood Publishing Group, 1992.
