= David Kirkland =

American actor and director (1878–1964)

- Born: November 26, 1878; San Francisco, California, United States
- Died: October 27, 1964 (aged 85); Los Angeles, California, United States
- Occupations: Director, Actor
- Years active: 1911-1943 (film)

David Henry Swim (November 26, 1878 – October 27, 1964), known professionally as David Kirkland, (Note: Also known as David Kirkland Swim) was an American actor and film director of the silent and early sound eras.

He was cast as Dr. Dopem in the Snakeville comedy series and directed several Keystone Studios comedy films. He was a pallbearer at Virginia Rappe's funeral. Kirkland's 1920 film The Perfect Woman was preserved by the Academy Film Archive in 2017.

Kirkland was born in San Francisco and attended the University of California at Berkeley. He married actress Cecyl Margherita Kennedy on May 19, 1925, in Los Angeles. He also was married to Dorothea Wolter.

== Partial filmography ==
- The Crippled Hand (1916)
- A Temperamental Wife (1919)
- A Virtuous Vamp (1919)
- In Search of a Sinner (1920)
- The Love Expert (1920)
- Nothing But the Truth (1920)
- The Perfect Woman (1920)
- The Rowdy (1921)
- The Ladder Jinx (1922)
- The Veiled Woman (1922)
- The Barefoot Boy (1923)
- For Another Woman (1924)
- The Tomboy (1924)
- Who Cares (1925)
- All Around Frying Pan (1925)
- The Tough Guy (1926)
- The Two-Gun Man (1926)
- A Regular Scout (1926)
- Hands Across the Border (1926)
- The Gingham Girl (1927)
- Yours to Command (1927)
- Uneasy Payments (1927)
- The Candy Kid (1928)
- Riders of the Cactus (1931)
- Flying Lariats (1931)
- So This Is Arizona (1931)

== Bibliography ==
- Munden, Kenneth White. The American Film Institute Catalog of Motion Pictures Produced in the United States, Part 1. University of California Press, 1997.
