= Flying Lariats =

1931 film

- Directed by: Alan James; David Kirkland
- Written by: Henry Taylor; Alan James
- Produced by: Robert Connell; R.B. Hooper
- Starring: Hal Taliaferro; Buzz Barton; Fred Church
- Cinematography: R.B. Hooper
- Edited by: Charles Connell
- Production company: Hooper-Connell Productions
- Distributed by: Big 4 Film
- Release date: August 25, 1931
- Running time: 60 minutes
- Country: United States
- Language: English

Flying Lariats is a 1931 American pre-Code Western film directed by Alan James and David Kirkland and starring Hal Taliaferro, Buzz Barton and Fred Church.

== Summary ==
Wally Dunbar is trying to get his brother, Sam Dunbar to marry Bonnie. When he proposes for his brother, she believes it is for himself as does Sam who overhears. But before Wally can straighten things out, the Sheriff enlists their help in chasing Tex who has conned Mr. Appleby out of $5,000 of the banks money.

== Cast ==
- Hal Taliaferro as Wally Dunbar
- Sam Garrett as Sam Dunbar
- Fred Church as Tex Johnson
- Don Wilson as Mr. Appleby
- Buzz Barton as Buzz Murphy
- Joe Lawliss as 'Dad' Starr
- Gus Anderson as Sheriff
- Bonnie Jean Gray as Bonnie Starr
- Tete Brady as Kate Weston
- Etta Delmas as Mrs. Murphy
- Lorraine LaVal as Telegraph Agent

== Writing and direction ==
- Directed by Alan James and David Kirkland.
- Written by Henry Taylor and Alan James.

== Bibliography ==
- Michael R. Pitts. Poverty Row Studios, 1929–1940: An Illustrated History of 55 Independent Film Companies, with a Filmography for Each. McFarland & Company, 2005.
