= William Pizor =

Filmmaker

William M. Pizor (1890–1959) was a pioneering film producer who also had a distribution company, Imperial Distributing Corporation. He was also president of production company Imperial Pictures. His son Irwin Pizor succeeded him in the film business.

He handled Westerns, documentaries, and foreign films he distributed in the U.S. Pizor made a deal with producer Louis Weiss to purchase 8 2-reel westerns.

Pizor produced a narrated travelogue short film about Olvera Street in 1937 titled A Street of Memory. It is extant.

== Filmography ==
- Out Of Step - A Live Wire Comedy. (c1920) with Art Hammond & Alice Doll - an extant film in the Niles Essanay Silent Film Archive.
- The Sea Feast - A Live Wire Comedy. (c1920) Poster Survives
- A Chocolate Cowboy - A Cyclone Comedy (1925) Poster Survives,
- Gasoline Cowboy (1926)
- Was He Guilty? (1927)
- Harem Scarem (1927)
- The Mansion of Mystery (1927
- The Rustler's End (1928)
- Flash of the Forest (1928)
- Heave-Ho, an extant Sid Smith and Teddy Reavis comedy
- The Tom-Boy, a comedy with Teddy Reavis. Extant.
- Trails of Treachery (1928) starring Montana Bill
- The House of Terror (1928) starring Fat O'Brien and Dorothy Tallcott
- The Sea Feast (1929)
- Raffles N' Rubber (1931)
- Secret Menace (1931)
- Ragus Yugo-Slavia (1931)
- Heroes All (1931), reissue with sound of 1920 documentary
- Two Gun Caballero (1931)
- Ubangi (1931)
- Garden Granary (1931)
- Blonde Captive (1932)
- Virgins of Bali (1932)
- The Texan (1932)
- The Galloping Kid (1932 film) (1932)
- Love's Memorial, Agra, India (1933)
- The Seventh Wonder (1933
- Corruption (1933)
- The Flaming Signal (1933)
- The Throne of the Gods (1933)
- Call of the Coyote (1934)
- The Woman Who Dared (1933)
- The Lone Rider (1934)
- Arizona Cyclone (1934 film) (1934)
- Port O'Call / City of the Sun (1934)
- Pals of the Prairie (1934 film) (1934)
- The Way of the West (1934)
- Napoleon's Waterloo (1934)
- Twisted Rails (1934)
- Wild Waters (1934)
- Pals of the West (1934)
- Carrying the Mail (1934)
- Sundown Trail (1934 film) (1934)
- After the Storm (1935 film) (1935)
- Manhattan Butterfly (1935)
- The Broken Coin (1936)
- Paradise Valley (1936)
- Gateway to the North (1937)
- A Street of Memory, a narrated travelogue about Olvera Street in Los Angeles

== See also ==
- Poverty Row
