= Morris R. Schlank =

American film producer (1879–1932)

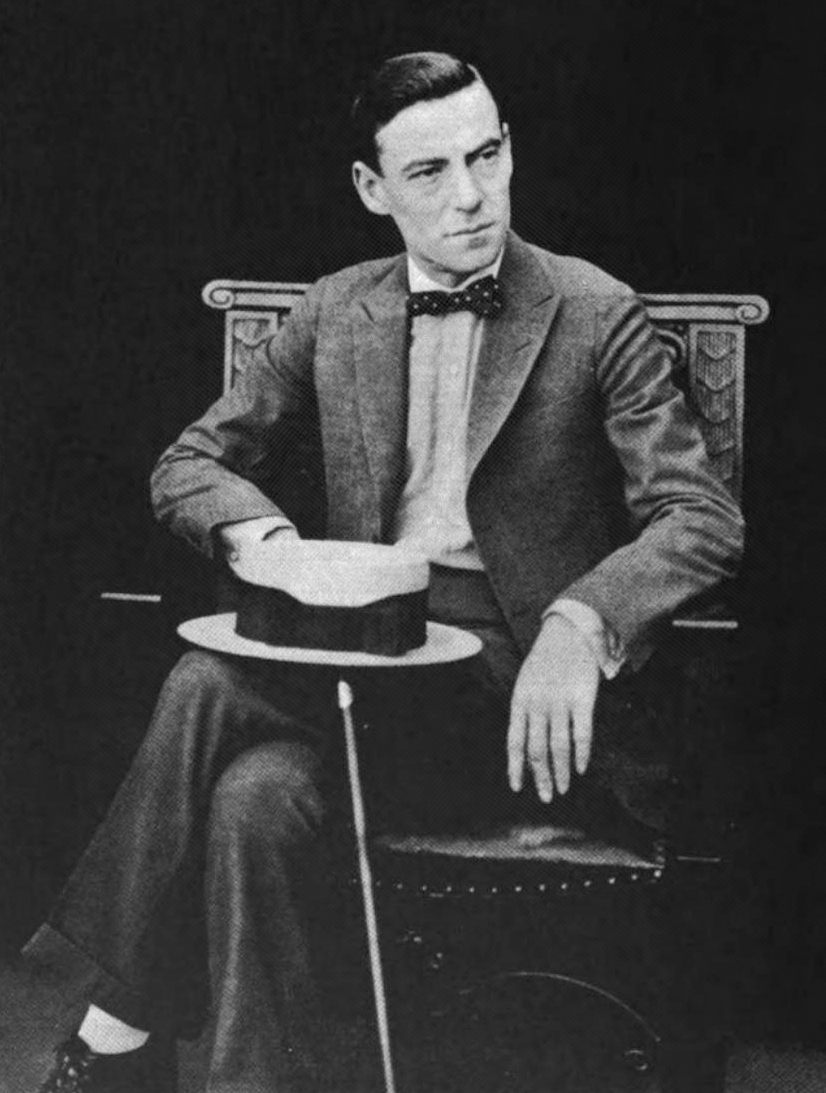
- Born: 1879; Omaha, Nebraska, United States
- Died: June 29, 1932 (aged 52–53); Murietta Hot Spring, California, United States
- Occupation: Producer
- Years active: 1920–1932 (film)

Morris R. Schlank (1879–1932) was an American film producer active during the silent and early sound era. He founded and ran his own independent company, Morris R. Schlank Productions.

== Selected filmography ==
- Dr. Jekyll and Mr. Hyde (1920) a short satire
- Dangerous Trails (1923)
- The Lost Express (1925)
- Red Blood (1925)
- The Open Switch (1925)
- Perils of the Rail (1925)
- Mistaken Orders (1925)
- Riding Romance (1925)
- The Texas Terror (1925)
- Crossed Signals (1926)
- Unseen Enemies (1926)
- The Road Agent (1926)
- The Slaver (1927)
- Devil Dogs (1928)
- Queen of the Chorus (1928)
- Riley of the Rainbow Division (1928)
- The Old Code (1928)
- The Broken Mask (1928)
- Top Sergeant Mulligan (1928)
- Obey Your Husband (1928)
- Hearts of Men (1928)
- Queen of the Chorus (1928)
- Dugan of the Dugouts (1928)
- Thundergod (1928)
- The Saddle King (1929)
- Thundering Thompson (1929)
- Drifting Souls (1932)
- Shop Angel (1932)
- Exposure (1932)
- Reform Girl (1933)

== Bibliography ==
- E.J. Stephens & Marc Wanamaker. Early Poverty Row Studios. Arcadia Publishing, 2014.
