= Deadwood Pass =

- Original film poster
- Directed by: J.P. McGowan
- Written by: Oliver Drake; J. Wesley Patterson (story)
- Produced by: Burton L. King
- Starring: Tom Tyler; Alice Dahl; Wally Wales
- Cinematography: Edward A. Kull
- Edited by: Fred Bain
- Production company: Monarch Film Corporation
- Distributed by: Freuler Film Associates
- Release date: May 5, 1933
- Running time: 62 minutes
- Country: United States
- Language: English

Deadwood Pass is a 1933 American Western pre-Code film directed by J.P. McGowan and starring Tom Tyler, Alice Dahl, and Wally Wales. The film was shot in Newhall, Santa Clarita, California and was the third of four Tom Tyler Westerns made by John R. Freuler.

== Plot ==
Postal inspector Tom Whitlock goes undercover as a bandit called the Hawk, where he infiltrates Butch Cassidy's gang.

== Cast ==
- Tom Tyler as Tom Whitlock
- Alice Dahl as Betty Rawlins
- Wally Wales as Pete Sorrenson
- Lafe McKee as Sheriff Rawlins
- Edmund Cobb as Mileaway Thomas
- Slim Whitaker as Butch Cassidy
- Merrill McCormick as Felipe
- Carlotta Monti as Lolita
- Bud Osborne as the Hawk
- Jay Wilsey as a Deputy (billed as Buffalo Bill Jr.)
