= Lariats and Six-Shooters =

1931 film

- Directed by: Alan James
- Written by: Carl Krusada
- Produced by: Robert J. Horner
- Starring: Jack Perrin; Ann Lee; George Chesebro
- Cinematography: Edward A. Kull
- Edited by: Fred Bain
- Production company: Cosmos Productions
- Distributed by: William Steiner Distribution
- Release date: October 25, 1931
- Running time: 55 minutes
- Country: United States
- Language: English

Lariats and Six-Shooters is a 1931 American pre-Code Western film directed by Alan James and starring Jack Perrin, Ann Lee and George Chesebro.

== Cast ==
- Jack Perrin
- Ann Lee
- George Chesebro
- Art Mix
- Virginia Bell
- Lafe McKee
- Richard Cramer
- Olin Francis
- Jimmy Aubrey
- Gloria Joy

== Plot ==
A sheriff's daughter and a prospector help a deputy sheriff capture a gang of smugglers.

== Bibliography ==
- Michael R. Pitts. Poverty Row Studios, 1929–1940: An Illustrated History of 55 Independent Film Companies, with a Filmography for Each. McFarland & Company, 2005.
