= Perils of the Rail =

1925 film

- Directed by: J. P. McGowan
- Written by: William E. Wing
- Produced by: Morris R. Schlank; J. P. McGowan
- Starring: Helen Holmes
- Cinematography: Walter L. Griffin
- Edited by: Betty Davis
- Distributed by: Anchor Film Distributors
- Release date: July 1925
- Running time: 61 minutes
- Country: USA
- Language: Silent..English titles

Perils of the Rail is a 1925 silent film action film directed by J. P. McGowan and starring Helen Holmes. IMDb trivia has the film being shot in 1924 but not released until 1925. The film survives as it is on DVD and a copy viewed by the AFI. The Library of Congress online source indicates "no holdings" or that it is lost.

== Cast ==
- Helen Holmes - Helen Martin
- Edward Hearn - Jack Hathaway
- Wilfrid North - Pepper Martin
- Lloyd Whitlock - Barker, The Claims Agent
- Dick Rush - The Manager of the Great Western Smelter
- Dan Crimmins - 'Slippery' McGee
- Norma Wills - Slippery's Wife
- J. P. McGowan - Barker's Accomplice at Smelter Junction
- Rex - Himself, Rex A Dog
