= The Fighting Gentleman =

1932 film

- Directed by: Fred C. Newmeyer
- Written by: Edward Sinclair (story); F. McGrew Willis (continuity, dialogue)
- Produced by: Freuler Film Associates (John R. Freuler); Monarch Films
- Starring: William Collier, Jr. Josephine Dunn
- Cinematography: Edward Kull
- Edited by: Fred Bain
- Distributed by: Freuler Film Associates
- Release date: October 7, 1932
- Running time: 68 minutes; 7 reels
- Country: United States
- Language: English

The Fighting Gentleman is a 1932 American pre-Code sports drama film directed by Fred C. Newmeyer with William Collier, Jr. and Josephine Dunn in the leads.

== Cast ==
- William Collier, Jr. as Jack Duncan aka The Fighting Gentleman
- Josephine Dunn as Jeanette Larkin
- Natalie Moorhead as Violet Reed
- Crauford Kent as Claude Morgan
- Lee Moran as Mr. Hurley
- Pat O'Malley as Dot Moran
- James J. Jeffries as Himself, James J. Jeffries, Referee
- Hughie Owen as Benny Strickland
- Mildred Rogers as Irene
- Patty O'Flynn as Barker
- Duke R. Lee as Announcer
