= His Fighting Blood =

1935 film by John English

- Directed by: John English
- Written by: James Oliver Curwood (story); Joseph O'Donnell
- Produced by: Maurice Conn; Sigmund Neufeld
- Starring: Kermit Maynard; Polly Ann Young; Paul Fix
- Cinematography: Jack Greenhalgh
- Edited by: Richard G. Wray
- Production company: Conn Pictures
- Distributed by: Ambassador Pictures
- Release date: October 15, 1935
- Running time: 57 minutes
- Country: United States
- Language: English

His Fighting Blood is a 1935 American Western film directed by John English and starring Kermit Maynard, Polly Ann Young and Paul Fix. It was produced on Poverty Row as a second feature. The film's sets were designed by the art director Fred Preble.

== Cast ==
- Kermit Maynard as Tom Elliott, RCMP
- Polly Ann Young as Doris Carstairs
- Paul Fix as Phil Elliott
- Ben Hendricks Jr. as Mack MacDonald, RCMP
- Ted Adams as Marsden
- Joseph W. Girard as RCMP Inspector Carstairs
- Frank LaRue as Al Gordon
- Frank O'Connor as Dick Ingram
- Charles King as Constable Black, RCMP
- Jack Cheatham as Constable Clark, RCMP
- Edward Cecil as Prison Warden
- Theodore Lorch as A. Leslie, the Jeweler
- Rocky as Tom's Horse

== Bibliography ==
- Goble, Alan. The Complete Index to Literary Sources in Film. Walter de Gruyter, 1999.
