= The Clean Up =

The Clean Up may refer to:

- The Clean-Up (1917 film), an American silent comedy western film directed by William Worthington
- The Clean Up (1923 film), an American silent comedy film directed by William Parke
- The Clean Up (1929 film), an American silent drama film directed by Bernard McEveety
