= Caryl Lincoln =

American actress (1903–1983)

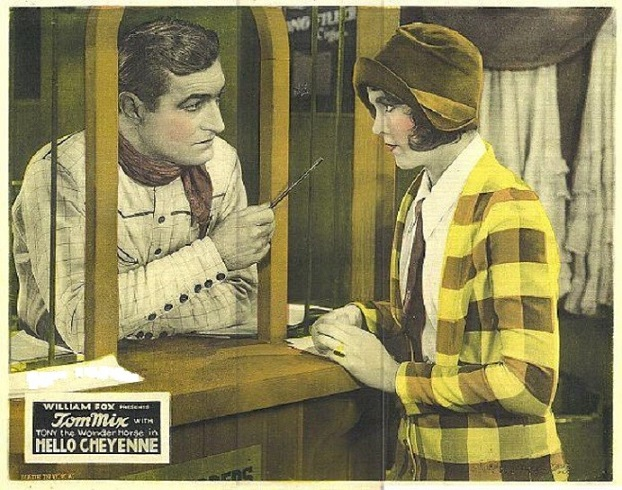
- Lobby card from Hello Cheyenne (1928)
- Born: November 16, 1903; Oakland, California, U.S.
- Died: February 20, 1983 (aged 79); Woodland Hills, California, U.S.
- Occupation: Actress
- Years active: 1927–1964
- Spouse: Byron Stevens (m. 1934; died 1964)
- Children: 1

Caryl Lincoln (November 16, 1903 – February 20, 1983) was an American film actress whose career spanned from 1927 to 1964.

== Biography ==
The Oakland, California-born Lincoln started her acting career in silent films. In 1927, she signed a long-term contract with Fox Film studios. Her first film was Slippery Silks in 1927. She starred in ten films from 1927 to the end of 1928 and was selected as a WAMPAS Baby Star in 1929. In 1930 she starred opposite Bob Steele in The Land of Missing Men, which started her on a path to several heroine roles in western films. One of her best known roles during this period was opposite Tom Tyler in War on the Range (1933).

Her career had slowed by 1934, however, and her last credited role was that same year, in Charlie Chan's Courage. She was a friend (and future sister-in-law) of actress Barbara Stanwyck, through whom she met Stanwyck's brother, Byron Stevens. She and Stevens married in 1934, and remained together until his death in 1964. She never remarried. They had one son, Brian.

When she tired of the effort needed to be a star in films, Lincoln chose to work as a bit player and extra rather than leave the profession.

Her acting career took a backseat to her marriage and family, with her having few roles from 1934 to 1964, all uncredited. She retired in 1964 and never returned to acting. She died on February 20, 1983, in the Woodland Hills area of Los Angeles, California.

== Filmography ==
Year	Title	Role	Notes
1927	Wolf Fangs	Ellen	
1928	A Girl in Every Port	Girl in Liverpool	Uncredited
1928	Hello Cheyenne	Diana Cody	
1928	Wild West Romance	Ruth Thorndyke	
1928	Tracked	Molly Butterfield	
1930	The Land of Missing Men	Nita Madero	
1931	The Spider	Audience Member	Uncredited
1931	The Cyclone Kid	Rose Comstock	
1931	Quick Trigger Lee	Rose Campbell	
1932	Human Targets		Uncredited
1932	Tangled Fortunes	Sally Martin	
1932	The Man from New Mexico	Sally Langton	
1932	Thrill of Youth	Marcia Dale	
1932	Back Street	Minor Role	Uncredited
1932	Okay, America!	Minor Role	Uncredited
1932	The Lost Special	Kate Bland	Serial
1933	Man of Action	Irene Sherman	
1933	War of the Range	Grace Carlysle	
1933	Only Yesterday		Uncredited
1934	Three on a Honeymoon	Guest at Captain's Tea	Uncredited
1934	The Life of Vergie Winters	One of Madame Claire's Girls	Uncredited
1934	Charlie Chan's Courage	Leading Lady	
1934	The Merry Widow	Maid to Sonia	Uncredited
1934	Elinor Norton	Publisher's Staff	Uncredited
1934	Kid Millions	Goldwyn Girl	Uncredited
1944	None Shall Escape	Housekeeper	Uncredited
1947	Golden Earrings	Farmer's Wife	Uncredited
1948	That Wonderful Urge	Secretary	Uncredited
1950	Mother Didn't Tell Me	Mrs. Raymond	Uncredited
1950	Cheaper by the Dozen	Teacher	Uncredited
1950	The Jackpot	Susan Wertheim	Uncredited
1951	Love Nest	Mrs. McNab	Uncredited
1956	Meet Me in Las Vegas	Casino Patron	Uncredited
1957	An Affair to Remember	Ballet Audience Member	Uncredited
1958	The Buccaneer	Party Guest	Uncredited
1959	This Earth Is Mine	Minor Role	Uncredited
1959	North by Northwest	Woman at Auction	Uncredited
1959	It Started with a Kiss	Party Guest	Uncredited
1960	Please Don't Eat the Daisies	Party Guest	Uncredited
1960	The Facts of Life	Woman at Airport	Uncredited
1961	Flower Drum Song	Club Patron	Uncredited
1962	All Fall Down	Clubwoman	Uncredited
1963	The Nutty Professor	Faculty Member	Uncredited
1964	Honeymoon Hotel	Jessie – Hotel Gift Shop Saleslady	Uncredited
1964	Marnie	Party Guest	Uncredited
1964	The Pleasure Seekers	Party Guest	Uncredited
1969	Topaz	Party Guest	Uncredited
