= Murder at Dawn =

1932 film

- Directed by: Richard Thorpe
- Written by: Barry Barringer (original story and screenplay)
- Produced by: John R. Freuler (executive producer); Burton L. King (supervising producer)
- Cinematography: Edward A. Kull
- Edited by: Frederick Bain
- Release date: February 15, 1932
- Running time: 62 minutes
- Country: United States
- Language: English

Murder at Dawn is a 1932 American pre-Code film directed by Richard Thorpe. The film is also known as The Death Ray in the United Kingdom.

== Plot ==
Mad scientist works on a death ray in his mountain hideaway.

== Cast ==
- Jack Mulhall as Danny
- Josephine Dunn as Doris Farrington
- Eddie Boland as Freddie
- Marjorie Beebe as Gertrude
- Martha Mattox as The Housekeeper
- Mischa Auer as Henry
- Phillips Smalley as Judge Folger
- Crauford Kent as Arnstein
- Frank Ball as Dr. Farrington
- Alfred Cross as Goddard
