= Betty Davis (film editor) =

American film editor

- Occupation: Film editor
- Years active: 1925–1929

Betty Davis was an American film editor active primarily in the 1920s. She also appeared in a few uncredited roles as an actress. As an editor, she worked primarily with Australian director J.P. McGowan. Later on, she cut films for Cliff Wheeler and Bernard McEveety.

== Selected filmography ==
- One Splendid Hour (1929)
- Montmartre Rose (1929)
- Daughters of Desire (1929)
- The Dream Melody (1929)
- The Clean Up (1929)
- Perils of the Rail (1925)
- Cold Nerve (1925)
- Blood and Steel (1925)
- Outwitted (1925)
