= The Cowboy and the Outlaw =

1929 film directed by J. P. McGowan

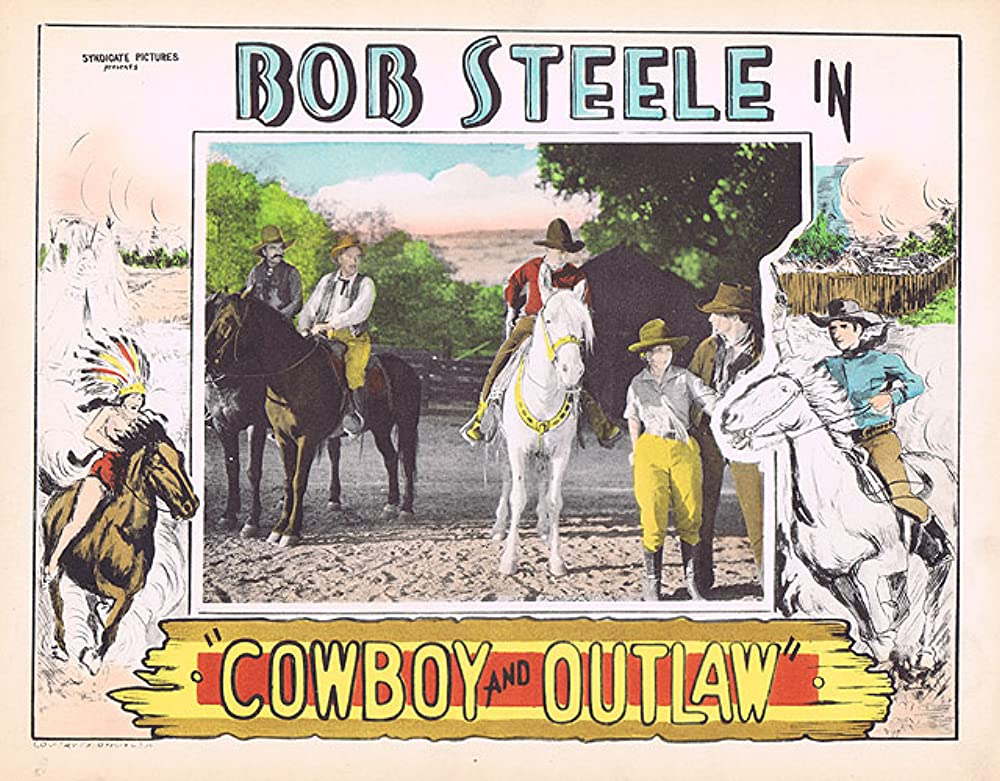
- Directed by: J. P. McGowan
- Written by: Sally Winters
- Produced by: W. Ray Johnston
- Starring: Bob Steele; Edna Aslin; Bud Osborne
- Cinematography: Hap Depew
- Production company: Big Productions Film Corporation
- Distributed by: Syndicate Film Exchange
- Release date: October 1, 1929
- Running time: 50 minutes
- Country: United States
- Languages: Silent; English intertitles

The Cowboy and the Outlaw is a 1929 American silent Western film directed by J. P. McGowan and starring Bob Steele, Edna Aslin and Bud Osborne. It was produced as an independent second feature on Poverty Row. It was originally shot as a silent film, but later had sound effects added.

== Plot ==
A ranch owner is killed on his way to the bank and a manhunt is launched for the culprit.

== Cast ==
- Bob Steele as George Hardcastle
- Edna Aslin as Bertha Bullhead
- Bud Osborne as Lefty Lawson
- Thomas G. Lingham as Tom Bullhead
- Cliff Lyons as Slim Saxon
- J. P. McGowan as Pepper Hardcastle
- Alfred Hewston as Walter Driver

== Bibliography ==
- Pitts, Michael R. Poverty Row Studios, 1929–1940. McFarland & Company, 2005.
