= Ted Adams (actor) =

American actor (1890–1973)

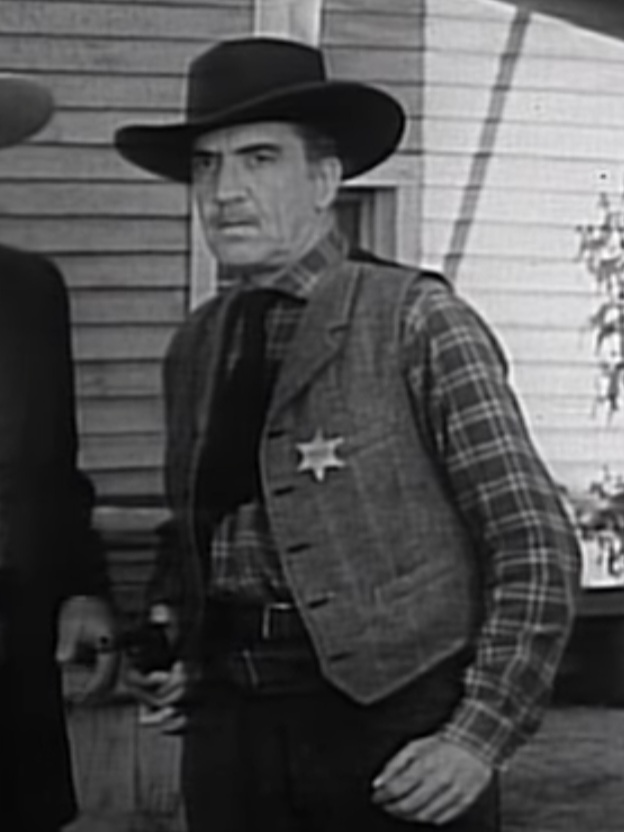
- Adams in Stagecoach to Denver (1946)
- Born: Richard Theodore Adams; March 17, 1890; New York City, U.S.
- Died: September 24, 1973 (aged 83); Los Angeles, California, U.S.
- Resting place: Chapel Of The Pines Crematory
- Occupation: Actor
- Years active: 1926–1952
- Spouse: Charlotte Adams

Richard Theodore Adams (March 17, 1890 – September 24, 1973) was an American film actor who appeared in nearly 200 films between 1926 and 1952.

== Early life ==
Adams was born in New York City. He appeared with his parents in their vaudeville act and later attended Cornell University. He served in World War I and World War II in the US Navy.

== Career ==
Adams' film career spanned more than three decades and included roles "on both sides of the law". He worked primarily in B-Westerns, often as a villain. Studios for which he worked included Monogram and PRC, and he was often seen in films that starred Johnny Mack Brown or Bob Steele. He also appeared in serials, including The Mysterious Pilot (1937), Holt of the Secret Service (1941), Daredevils of the West (1943), and King of the Rocket Men (1949).

== Later life and death ==
Late in his career, Adams acted on television Westerns, including The Cisco Kid, Cowboy G-Men, and The Lone Ranger. On September 24, 1973, Adams died in Los Angeles, California, at age 83. His remains were cremated and are interred at Chapel of the Pines Crematory in Los Angeles.

== Selected filmography ==
- The Road Agent (1926)
- Rider of the Plains (1931)
- Ships of Hate (1931)
- God's Country and the Man (1931)
- The Cyclone Kid (1931)
- The Savage Girl (1932)
- Malay Nights (1932)
- Human Targets (1932)
- The Gambling Sex (1932)
- Battling Buckaroo (1932)
- Sagebrush Trail (1933)
- War of the Range (1933)
- Easy Millions (1933)
- Man of Action (1933)
- Her Forgotten Past (1933)
- The Law of 45's (1935)
- His Fighting Blood (1935)
- The Gambling Terror (1937)
- It Happened Out West (1937)
- Smoke Tree Range (1937)
- The Mysterious Pilot (1937)
- Pals of the Saddle (1938)
- Paroled from the Big House (1938)
- El Diablo Rides (1939)
- Fighting Mad (1939)
- The Pal from Texas (1939)
- Three Texas Steers (1939)
- Smoky Trails (1939)
- Crashing Thru (1939)
- Billy the Kid Outlawed (1940)
- Wild Horse Valley (1940)
- Frontier Crusader (1940)
- Gun Code (1940)
- Pioneer Days (1940)
- East Side Kids (1940)
- Law and Order (1940)
- Billy the Kid's Gun Justice (1940)
- The Lone Rider in Frontier Fury (1941)
- The Lone Rider Ambushed (1941)
- Billy the Kid's Range War (1941)
- Outlaws of Boulder Pass (1942)
- Overland Stagecoach (1942)
- Billy the Kid Trapped (1942)
- Billy the Kid's Smoking Guns (1942)
- The Mysterious Rider (1942)
- Daredevils of the West (1943)
- The Kid Rides Again (1943)
- Trigger Fingers (1946)
- Swing, Cowboy, Swing (1946)
- The Law Comes to Gunsight (1947)
- Prairie Express (1947)
- Raiders of the South (1947)
- Range Beyond the Blue (1947)
- Song of the Wasteland (1947)
- Valley of Fear (1947)
- Back Trail (1948)
- Frontier Agent (1948)
- Gun Runner (1949)
- Haunted Trails (1949)
- Across the Rio Grande (1949)
- King of the Rocket Men (1949)
- Kansas Territory (1952)
