= When Lightning Strikes =

1934 film directed by Burton L. King

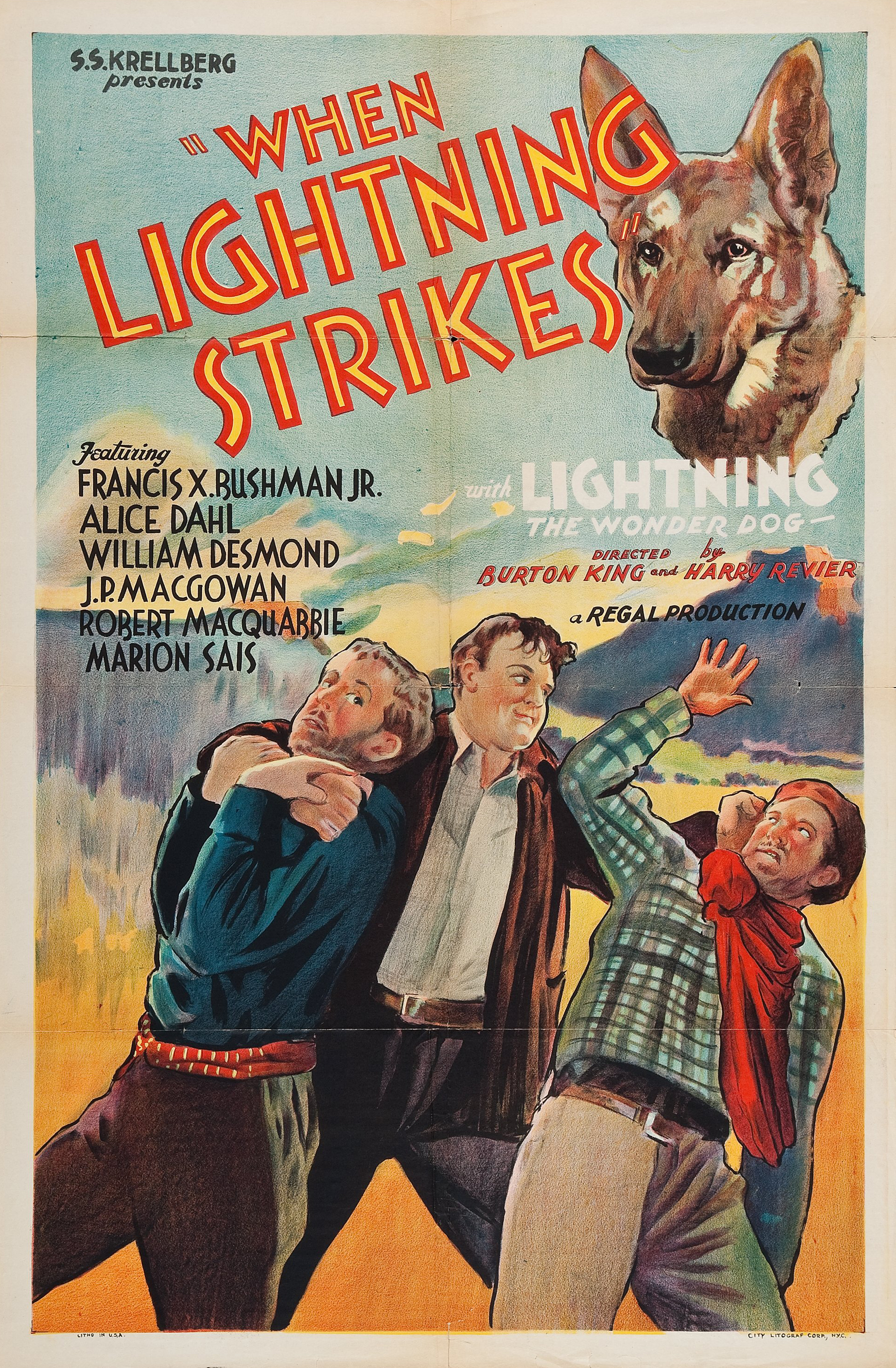
- Directed by: Burton L. King; Harry Revier
- Written by: George Morgan
- Produced by: Burton L. King
- Starring: Francis X. Bushman Jr. Alice Dahl; J.P. McGowan
- Cinematography: Edward A. Kull
- Edited by: Fred Bain
- Music by: Lee Zahler
- Production company: Regal Productions
- Distributed by: William Steiner Distribution
- Release date: December 18, 1934
- Running time: 55 minutes
- Country: United States
- Language: English

When Lightning Strikes is a 1934 American action film directed by Burton L. King and Harry Revier and starring Francis X. Bushman Jr., Alice Dahl and J.P. McGowan.

== Cast ==
- Francis X. Bushman Jr. as Matt Caldwell
- Alice Dahl as Helen Stevens
- J.P. McGowan as Lafe Broderick
- Tom London as Wolf
- Blackie Whiteford as Hunky
- William Desmond as Marshal Jack Stevens
- Marin Sais as Mrs. Stevens
- Murdock MacQuarrie as Jim Caldwell
- Lightning the Wonder Dog as Lightning

== Bibliography ==
- Michael R. Pitts. Poverty Row Studios, 1929–1940: An Illustrated History of 55 Independent Film Companies, with a Filmography for Each. McFarland & Company, 2005.
