= Francis X. Bushman Jr. =

American actor (1903–1978)

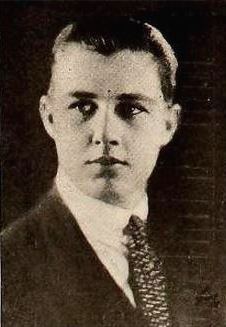
- Bushman in 1920
- Born: Ralph Everly Bushman; May 1, 1903; Baltimore, Maryland, U.S.
- Died: April 16, 1978 (aged 74); Los Angeles, California, U.S.
- Occupation: Actor
- Years active: 1920–1943
- Spouse(s): Beatrice Dante (m. 1924; his death, 1978)
- Children: 1
- Father: Francis X. Bushman
- Relatives: Pat Conway (nephew)

Ralph Everly Bushman (May 1, 1903 – April 16, 1978) was an American actor who appeared in 55 films between 1920 and 1943. In his early film career, he often was credited as Francis X. Bushman Jr.

The son of notable silent film star Francis X. Bushman and Josephine Louisa Fladung, he was born in Baltimore and died in Los Angeles at the age of 74. He was a maternal uncle of Pat Conway, star of the television series Tombstone Territory (1957–1960). Bushman and his wife Beatrice were married for 54 years at the time of his death. They had one child, Barbara Bushman.

== Selected filmography ==
- Our Hospitality (1923)
- The Man Life Passed By (1923)
- Never Too Late (1925)
- The Pride of the Force (1925)
- Brown of Harvard (1926)
- Dangerous Traffic (1926)
- Eyes Right! (1926)
- Midnight Faces (1926)
- The Understanding Heart (1927)
- Four Sons (1928)
- The Sins of the Children (1930)
- They Learned About Women (1930)
- The Girl Said No (1930)
- The Royal Bed (1930)
- Way Out West (1930)
- The Cyclone Kid (1931)
- The Galloping Ghost (film serial, 1931)
- The Last Frontier (film serial, 1932)
- Human Targets (1932)
- Tangled Fortunes (1932)
- The Three Musketeers (film serial, 1933)
- Viva Villa! (1934)
- When Lightning Strikes (1934)
- Caryl of the Mountains (1936)
