= Headin' for Trouble =

1931 film directed by J.P. McGowan

- Directed by: J.P. McGowan
- Written by: George Morgan
- Starring: Bob Custer; Betty Mack; John Ince
- Cinematography: Edward A. Kull
- Edited by: Fred Bain
- Production company: Big 4 Film
- Distributed by: Big 4 Film
- Release date: September 22, 1931
- Running time: 60 minutes
- Country: United States
- Language: English

Headin' for Trouble is a 1931 American pre-Code Western film directed by J.P. McGowan and starring Bob Custer, Betty Mack and John Ince.

== Main cast ==
- Bob Custer as Cyclone Crosby
- Betty Mack as Mary Courtney
- John Ince as Poker Slade
- Buck Connors as John Courtney
- Andy Shuford as Bobbie Courtney
- Robert D. Walker as Butch Morgan - Henchman
- Duke R. Lee as Andrews - Henchman

== Plot ==
After Crosby intervenes to protect Courtney from Morgan's unwanted advanced, her father asks Crosby to stay around. Crosby sets a trap for the outlaws, and afterward he is revealed to be a ranger working undercover.

== Bibliography ==
- Michael R. Pitts. Poverty Row Studios, 1929–1940: An Illustrated History of 55 Independent Film Companies, with a Filmography for Each. McFarland & Company, 2005.
