= Harmony Trail =

1944 American Western film

- Directed by: Robert Emmett Tansey
- Written by: Robert Emmett Tansey
- Produced by: Walt Mattox; Robert Emmett Tansey
- Starring: Ken Maynard; Eddie Dean; Ruth Roman
- Cinematography: Edward A. Kull
- Edited by: Fred Bain
- Music by: Frank Sanucci
- Production company: Walt Mattox Productions
- Distributed by: Meridian Pictures (1944); Astor Pictures (1947)
- Release date: December 1, 1944
- Running time: 57 minutes
- Country: United States
- Language: English

Harmony Trail is a 1944 American Western film directed by Robert Emmett Tansey and starring Ken Maynard, featuring Eddie Dean and Ruth Roman. Its early distribution was limited, and it was given a fuller release in 1947 by Astor Pictures under the alternate title of White Stallion. The film was written, co-produced, and directed by veteran low-budget filmmaker Robert Emmett Tansey, taking writer credit as Frank Simpson and director credit as Robert Emmett.

== Plot ==
Federal marshal Rocky Camron dispatches three of his men -- Ken Maynard, Eddie Dean, and Max Terhune -- to capture a gang of bank robbers. The three marshals, going undercover for the assignment, join Pop Martin's medicine show. Maynard performs trick roping and shooting, Dean sings, and Terhune does a ventriloquist act. One of the outlaws passes a $10 bill from the bank loot, and the three marshals trace it to a local rancher. They take him into protective custody, but a shot is fired through the jailhouse window, killing the rancher. Maynard arrests the outlaw leader Sorrell, who dares Maynard to produce proof of Sorrell's involvement. Terhune locates a man who witnessed the $10 transaction, and the witness identifies one of Sorrell's henchmen.

== Cast ==
- Ken Maynard as Marshal Ken Maynard
- Eddie Dean as Marshal Eddie Dean
- Max Terhune as Marshal Max Terhune
- Rocky Camron (Gene Alsace) as Marshal Rocky Camron
- Glenn Strange as Marshal Taylor
- Ruth Roman as Ann Martin
- Robert McKenzie as Pop Martin
- Charles King as Jim Sorrell
- Bud Osborne as Henchman Tip
- Al Ferguson as Henchman Red
- Dan White as Henchman Bronco
- Fred Gildart as Sleepy, assistant
- Jerry Shields as Henchman Tex
- John Bridges as Sheriff Brent
- Hal Price as Jeff Hodges, rancher

== Release ==
Harmony Trail was originally released in 1944 by Sam Nathanson's Meridian Pictures, an independent merchandiser of motion-picture novelty shorts. Because the film was not released through the usual studio channels, it made almost no impression during its initial release and none of the trade publications bothered to review it.

In 1945 producer Walt Mattox joined the staff of exhibitor turned producer Robert L. Lippert, as production supervisor for Lippert's new firm Action Pictures. Mattox offered Harmony Trail to Lippert in December 1945. Harmony Trail stayed on the shelf while Lippert reorganized Action Pictures as Screen Guild Productions in 1946. Mattox then sold the Harmony Trail reissue rights to Robert M. Savini of Astor Pictures, Savini gave the film much wider distribution in both the theatrical 35mm format and the nontheatrical 16mm format.

By 1947 Ken Maynard was no longer a current attraction -- this was his last starring film -- but supporting player Eddie Dean was now a popular cowboy star and ingenue Ruth Roman was an up-and-coming starlet in major-studio productions. Savini's advertising and promotion emphasized Dean and Roman, under the film's new title White Stallion, giving the impression that the film was brand new instead of a three-year-old production. Because so few people had seen Harmony Trail, White Stallion was promoted and accepted as a first-run release.

The film cashed in on a new, popular cycle of screen entertainment. As Boxoffice commented, "There are a number of stallions running around the film curb. Eagle-Lion has Red Stallion, Monogram has Silver Stallion, [others have] Black Stallion and White Stallion, and Warners has Stallion Road.

== Reception ==
Variety, reviewing the 1947 release, graded White Stallion as "routine" but said, "Picture is well paced, has a certain marquee value with Ken Maynard and Eddie Dean. Film makes some slight departure in that the cast toppers run through the film using their own names. Only obvious advantage in this procedure is the easy identification of the players... Robert Emmett's direction is fast and Frank Simpson's screenplay is good inasmuch as it uses a minimum of dialogue."

== Bibliography ==
- Pitts, Michael R. Western Movies: A Guide to 5,105 Feature Films. McFarland, 2012.
