= The Cyclone Kid (1931 film) =

1931 film directed by J.P. McGowan

- Directed by: J.P. McGowan
- Written by: George Morgan
- Produced by: Burton L. King
- Starring: Buzz Barton; Francis X. Bushman Jr.; Caryl Lincoln
- Cinematography: Edward A. Kull
- Edited by: Fred Bain
- Production company: Big 4 Film
- Distributed by: Big 4 Film
- Release date: October 26, 1931
- Running time: 60 minutes
- Country: United States
- Language: English

The Cyclone Kid is a 1931 American pre-Code Western film directed by J.P. McGowan and starring Buzz Barton, Francis X. Bushman Jr. and Caryl Lincoln.

== Cast ==
- Buzz Barton as Buddy Comstock
- Francis X. Bushman Jr. as Steve Andrews
- Caryl Lincoln as Rose Comstock
- Lafe McKee as Harvey Comstock
- Ted Adams as Joe Clark
- Nadja as Pepita
- Blackie Whiteford as Henchman Pete
- Silver Harr as Sheriff

== Bibliography ==
- Michael R. Pitts. Poverty Row Studios, 1929–1940: An Illustrated History of 55 Independent Film Companies, with a Filmography for Each. McFarland & Company, 2005.
