= Marriage on Approval =

1933 film

- Directed by: Howard Higgin
- Written by: Priscilla Wayne (novel); Olga Printzlau; Edward Sinclair; Howard Higgin
- Produced by: John R. Freuler
- Starring: Barbara Kent; Don Dillaway; William Farnum
- Cinematography: Edward A. Kull
- Edited by: Fred Bain
- Production company: Monarch Film Corporation
- Distributed by: Freuler Film Associates; British Lion (UK)
- Release date: November 22, 1933
- Running time: 67 minutes
- Country: United States
- Language: English

Marriage on Approval is a 1933 pre-Code American drama film directed by Howard Higgin and starring Barbara Kent, Don Dillaway and William Farnum. It was released in the United Kingdom by British Lion under the alternative title of Married in Haste.

== Plot ==
The teenage daughter of a puritanical Reverend promises him she will not marry until she is older, but after a night of heavy drinking she wakes up to find she has a husband.

== Cast ==
- Barbara Kent as Beth MacDougall
- Don Dillaway as Larry Bennett
- William Farnum as Reverend John MacDougall
- Edward Woods as Billy McGee
- Dorothy Granger as Hortense Bailey
- Phyllis Barry as Dorothy
- Leila McIntyre as Mary MacDonald
- Lucille Ward as Mrs. Walker
- Otis Harlan as Justice of the Peace Michael O'Connors
- Clarence Geldert as Deacon Cahill

== Bibliography ==
- Pitts, Michael R. Poverty Row Studios, 1929-1940. McFarland & Company, 2005.
