= The Scarlet Brand =

1932 film

- Directed by: J.P. McGowan
- Written by: Oliver Drake; Ethel Hill; Frederick Ryter
- Produced by: Burton L. King
- Starring: Bob Custer; Betty Mack; Robert D. Walker
- Cinematography: Edward A. Kull
- Edited by: Fred Bain
- Production company: Big 4 Film Corporation
- Distributed by: Big 4 Film Corporation
- Release date: April 10, 1932
- Running time: 58 minutes
- Country: United States
- Language: English

The Scarlet Brand is a 1932 American pre-Code Western film directed by J.P. McGowan and starring Bob Custer, Betty Mack and Robert D. Walker.

== Cast ==
- Bob Custer as Bud Bryson
- Betty Mack as Ellen Walker
- Robert D. Walker as Bill Morse
- Frank Ball as John Walker
- Duke R. Lee as Sheriff Clem Daniels
- Nelson McDowell as Slim Grant
- Blackie Whiteford as Cactus - Henchman
- Frederick Ryter as Squint - Henchman
- William L. Nolte as Lefty - Henchman
- Jack Long as Pete - Henchman

== Bibliography ==
- Michael R. Pitts. Poverty Row Studios, 1929–1940: An Illustrated History of 55 Independent Film Companies, with a Filmography for Each. McFarland & Company, 2005.
