= Code of Honor (1930 film) =

1930 film directed by J.P. McGowan

- Directed by: J.P. McGowan
- Written by: George Arthur Durlam
- Produced by: George Arthur Durlam
- Starring: Mahlon Hamilton; Doris Hill; Lafe McKee
- Cinematography: Otto Himm
- Edited by: Arthur A. Brooks
- Production company: G.A. Durlam Productions
- Distributed by: Syndicate Film Exchange
- Release date: October 16, 1930
- Running time: 55 minutes
- Country: United States
- Language: English

Code of Honor is a 1930 American Pre-Code Western film directed by J.P. McGowan and starring Mahlon Hamilton, Doris Hill and Lafe McKee.

== Plot ==
Cardsharp Jack Cardigan goes straight when he falls in love with Doris Bradfield, but then finds his old skills are in need one more time to assist her father.

== Cast ==
- Mahlon Hamilton as Jack Cardigan
- Doris Hill as Doris Bradfield
- Robert Graves as Jed Harden
- Stanley Taylor as Tom Bradfield
- Lafe McKee as Dad Bradfield
- Jimmy Aubrey as Nosey
- Harry Holden as Lawyer Slack
- William J. Dyer as Sheriff Asa Smyth
- Barney Beasley as Barfly
- Milton Brown as Barfly
- Frank Clark as Dealer with Visor
- Alfred Hewston as Barfly
- Cliff Lyons as Ranch Hand
- Blackie Whiteford as Blackie - Card Player

== Bibliography ==
- Pitts, Michael R. Poverty Row Studios, 1929–1940. McFarland & Company, 2005.
