= The Drag-Net (1936 film) =

1936 film

- Directed by: Vin Moore
- Written by: Willard Mack (play); James Mulhauser
- Produced by: Burton L. King; William Nicholas Selig
- Starring: Rod La Rocque; Marian Nixon; Betty Compson
- Cinematography: Edward A. Kull
- Edited by: Douglass Biggs; Thomas Neff
- Production company: Burroughs-Tarzan Pictures
- Distributed by: Burroughs-Tarzan Pictures
- Release date: April 15, 1936
- Running time: 61 minutes
- Country: United States
- Language: English

The Drag-Net is a 1936 American crime film directed by Vin Moore and starring Rod La Rocque, Marian Nixon and Betty Compson. It was made as a second feature at the Talisman Studios in Hollywood.

== Plot ==
A young playboy attorney is fired from his father's firm due to his lifestyle. He instead takes a job with the district attorney's office taking on a major crime gang.

== Cast ==
- Rod La Rocque as Lawrence Thomas Jr.
- Marian Nixon as Katherine 'Kit' van Buren
- Betty Compson as Mollie Cole
- Jack Adair as Joseph 'Joe' Ross
- John Dilson as Arnold Crane
- Edward Keane as Asst. District Attorney Arthur Hill
- Donald Kerr as Al Wilson
- Joseph W. Girard as Thomas J. Harrison, District Attorney
- John Bantry as Fred Cole
- Edward LeSaint as Lawrence Thomas Sr.
- Allen Mathews as Louie Miller
- Sidney Payne as Spike - the Headwaiter
- Gertrude Messinger as Switchboard Operator
- Murdock MacQuarrie as Hot-Check Gambler
- Jack Cheatham as Cop

== Bibliography ==
- Pitts, Michael R. Poverty Row Studios, 1929-1940. McFarland & Company, 2005.
