= Dangerous Waters (1936 film) =

1936 film by Lambert Hillyer

- Theatrical release poster
- Directed by: Lambert Hillyer
- Screenplay by: Richard Schayer; Hazel Jamieson; Malcolm Stuart Boylan
- Story by: Theodore Reeves
- Produced by: Fred S. Meyer
- Starring: Jack Holt; Robert Armstrong; Grace Bradley; Diana Gibson; Charles Murray; Willard Robertson
- Cinematography: Harry Forbes
- Edited by: Murray Seldeen
- Music by: Franz Waxman
- Production company: Universal Pictures
- Distributed by: Universal Pictures
- Release date: February 10, 1936
- Running time: 66 minutes
- Country: United States
- Language: English

Dangerous Waters is a 1936 American adventure film directed by Lambert Hillyer and written by Richard Schayer, Hazel Jamieson and Malcolm Stuart Boylan. The film stars Jack Holt, Robert Armstrong, Grace Bradley, Diana Gibson, Charles Murray and Willard Robertson. The film was released on February 10, 1936, by Universal Pictures.

== Cast ==
- Jack Holt as Jim Marlowe
- Robert Armstrong as 'Dusty' Johnson
- Grace Bradley as Joan Marlowe
- Diana Gibson as Ruth Denning
- Charles Murray as Chief Engineer McDuffy
- Willard Robertson as Bill MacKeechie
- Guy Usher as Captain Denning
- Dewey Robinson as Chips
- Edward Gargan as Bosun
- Edwin Maxwell as Mr. Brunch
- Richard Alexander as Hays
- Walter Miller as Oleson
- Donald Briggs as Quartermaster
- John 'Dusty' King as Singing Sailor
