= One Million in Jewels =

1922 film directed by J. P. McGowan

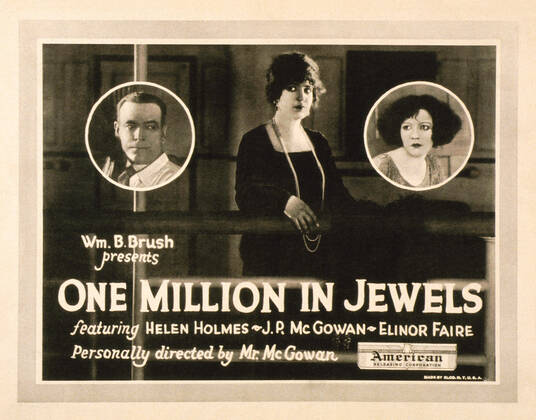
- Directed by: J.P. McGowan
- Written by: J.P. McGowan
- Produced by: William B. Brush
- Starring: Helen Holmes; Elinor Fair; J.P. McGowan
- Cinematography: William H. Tuers
- Production company: William B. Brush Productions
- Distributed by: American Releasing Corporation
- Release date: February 4, 1923
- Running time: 50 minutes
- Country: United States
- Languages: Silent; English intertitles

One Million in Jewels is a 1923 American silent crime film directed by J.P. McGowan and starring Helen Holmes, Elinor Fair and McGowan. It was shot in Miami, New York and Havana.

== Synopsis ==
A secret service agent is assigned to track a gang smuggling valuable jewels from Cuba into the United States. However, things are complicated when he falls in love with one of the members of the organization.

== Cast ==
- Helen Holmes as Helen Morgan
- J.P. McGowan as Burke
- Elinor Fair as Sylvia Ellis
- Nellie Parker Spaulding as Jane Angle
- Charles Craig as George Beresford
- Leslie Casey as William Abbott
- H.H. Pattee as Morgan

== Bibliography ==
- Connelly, Robert B. The Silents: Silent Feature Films, 1910-36, Volume 40, Issue 2. December Press, 1998.
- Munden, Kenneth White. The American Film Institute Catalog of Motion Pictures Produced in the United States, Part 1. University of California Press, 1997.
