= The Land of Missing Men =

1930 film by John P. McCarthy

- Directed by: John P. McCarthy
- Written by: John P. McCarthy; Bob Quigley (script)
- Produced by: Trem Carr
- Cinematography: Harry Neumann
- Production company: Trem Carr Productions
- Distributed by: Tiffany Productions
- Release date: September 22, 1930
- Running time: 55 minutes
- Country: United States
- Language: English

The Land of Missing Men is a 1930 American pre-Code Western film written and directed by John P. McCarthy – with a script from Bob Quigley – and produced by Trem Carr for his studio Trem Carr Productions. Starring Bob Steele, Al St. John, Eddie Dunn, Caryl Lincoln, Al Jennings and Fern Emmett.

The film was released on September 22, 1930, in the United States by Tiffany Productions, and received mostly positive reviews from critics. It was the third film in a series of Trem Carr productions starring Western actor Bob Steele, following Near the Rainbow's End and Oklahoma Cyclone (both 1930), the latter also directed by McCarthy.

== Plot ==
Steve O'Neil and his partner, Buckshot, after being accused of holding up a stagecoach in cattle country, are asked by a dying man to save his daughter from a planned stagecoach holdup.

== Cast ==
The American Film Institute lists the following cast for the film:

- Bob Steele as Steve O'Neil
- Al St. John as Buckshot
- Eddie Dunn aa Sheriff Bower
- Caryl Lincoln as Nita Madero
- Al Jennings as John Evans
- Fern Emmett as Martha Evans
- Emilio Fernandez as López
- Noah Hendricks as Texas

== Production ==
Production began on August 1, 1930. The sound was recorded with the RCA Photophone.

== Release and reception ==
The six reel Western, approximately 5,100 feet long, runs for 55 minutes, and was released on September 22, 1930, distributed in the United States by Tiffany Productions. The October 5, 1930, issue of The Film Daily called the film "a standout among Westerns", and praised the direction of McCarthy and Bob Steele's performance, adding that "Bob Steele does the best work of his career under this able direction". The October 29 issue of Variety reviewed the film less favourably, however, and considered the film to be an "average Western". J.L.K. of Exhibitors Daily Review and Motion Pictures Today (later Motion Picture Daily) criticised the screenplay but praised the performances, saying "there are many more moments that stand out as the some of the best and most original stuff ever shot in westerns [sic]".

== See also ==
- Bob Steele filmography
- List of American films of 1930
