= Vin Moore =

American film director

- Born: January 23, 1879; Mayville, New York, US
- Died: December 5, 1949 (aged 70); Hollywood, California, US
- Occupation: Film director
- Years active: 1915–1938

Vin Moore (January 23, 1879 – December 5, 1949) was an American film director, actor and writer. He directed 83 films between 1915 and 1938. He was born in Mayville, New York, and died in Hollywood, California.

== Selected filmography ==
- Captain Kidd, Jr. (1919)
- Distilled Love (1920)
- Lazy Lightning (1926)
- The Man from the West (1926)
- See America Thirst (1930)
- Many a Slip (1931)
- Flirting with Danger (1934)
- Love Past Thirty (1934)
- Cheers of the Crowd (1935)
- The Drag-Net (1936)
- Topa Topa (1938)
