= Midnight Faces =

1926 film

- Directed by: Bennett Cohen
- Written by: Bennett Cohen
- Produced by: Otto K. Schreier
- Starring: Ralph Bushman; Kathryn McGuire; Jack Perrin
- Cinematography: King D. Gray
- Edited by: Fred Bain
- Distributed by: Goodwill Pictures
- Release date: March 25, 1926
- Running time: 53 minutes
- Country: United States
- Languages: Silent film English intertitles

Midnight Faces (1926) is a silent film starring Francis X. Bushman, Jr. and Jack Perrin. The film is an 'old dark house' murder mystery in the same genre as One Exciting Night (1922), The Ghost Breaker (1922), The Bat (1926) and The Cat and the Canary (1927).

Critic Christopher Workman called it "a thoroughly unmemorable entry in the run of old dark house horror comedies" handled with an "absence of style, atmosphere and wit ... Even at less than an hour, the film drags interminably." Conversely, Jonathan Rigby, in his book American Gothic, noted that the film "works some interesting variations on the standard clichés" and that "as rip-offs go, Midnight Faces is unusually engaging and intelligent."

== Cast ==
- Ralph Bushman - Lynn Claymore (credited as Francis X. Bushman Jr.)
- Jack Perrin - Richard Mason, the lawyer
- Kathryn McGuire - Mary Bronson
- Edward Peil, Sr. - Suie Chang, the Chinese stranger
- Charles Belcher - Samuel Lund
- Nora Cecil - Mrs. Lund
- Martin Turner - Trohelius Snapp, the black servant

== Plot ==
Lynn Claymore inherits an estate in a Florida swamp from an uncle he never knew. His lawyer Richard Mason accompanies him to the property. A strange Chinese man is seen wandering the grounds at night, and a man in a cape is spotted skulking down the corridors by Claymore's clichéd "fraidy-cat" black manservant Trohelius. Then a young woman named Mary Bronson shows up, asking to be allowed in to escape an assailant with a knife who she says was stalking her.
