= The Savage Girl (film) =

1932 film

- Directed by: Harry L. Fraser
- Written by: Brewster Morse (story, continuity & dialogue)
- Produced by: Henry R. Freuler (producer); John R. Freuler (executive producer)
- Starring: See below
- Cinematography: Edward A. Kull
- Edited by: Frederick Bain
- Production companies: Freuler Film Associates, Inc.
- Release date: December 1932
- Running time: 66 minutes 52 minutes (American DVD)
- Country: United States
- Language: English

The Savage Girl is a 1932 American pre-Code film directed by Harry L. Fraser.

== Plot ==
An explorer, Jim, is solicited by Amos, a rich, drunken man to capture animals for a zoo he is building at his home in Westchester County, New York at a late-night party and demands to be taken to Africa the next morning. They acquire excessive gear for the journey including an automobile and a mouse to determine whether or not elephants are afraid of them. They disembark on a ship for an undisclosed country where the jungle is rumored to be ruled by a mysterious queen of the animals. Upon their arrival, they hire a large crew, including Oscar, a manservant from Harlem, and venture into the jungle and capture a lion.

Meanwhile, the Jungle Queen has been watching the hunters and sends her chimpanzee servant to rescue the captive lion. Upon discovering their prize gone, the hunters suspect the Jungle Queen and manage to catch her in a pitfall trap. When one of the hunters is kicked out of the camp for assaulting her, the Jungle Queen grows attached to an initially disinterested Jim. When the scorned hunter returns with a band of armed tribesman, he kidnaps Jim who is saved by a gorilla loyal to the Jungle Queen. The movie ends as Jim and the Jungle Queen kiss.

== Cast ==
- Rochelle Hudson as The Girl
- Walter Byron as Jim Franklin, misspelled Franklyn in on-screen castlist
- Harry Myers as Amos P. Stitch
- Adolph Milar as Alec Bernouth
- Ted Adams as Chauffeur
- Floyd Shackelford as Oscar

== Production ==
Freuler Film Associates announced the film in late June 1932. Production began in early September 1932 under the working title "Roar of the Jungle," and The Savage Girl entered the editing room in late October 1932.
