= The Dream Melody =

1929 film

- Directed by: Burton L. King
- Written by: Isadore Bernstein; Lenore Gray; Hazel Jamieson; Carmelita Sweeney
- Produced by: Samuel Zierler; Burton L. King
- Starring: John Roche; Mabel Julienne Scott; Rosemary Theby
- Cinematography: Walter Haas; William Miller
- Edited by: Betty Davis
- Production company: Excellent Pictures
- Distributed by: Excellent Pictures
- Release date: January 25, 1929
- Running time: 57 minutes
- Country: United States
- Languages: Silent; English intertitles

The Dream Melody is a 1929 American silent drama film directed by Burton L. King and starring John Roche, Mabel Julienne Scott and Rosemary Theby.

== Cast ==
- John Roche as Richard Gordon
- Mabel Julienne Scott as Mary Talbot
- Rosemary Theby as Alicia Harrison
- Robert D. Walker as George Monroe
- Adabelle Driver as Nora Flanigan
- Adolph Faylauer as Signor Malesco
- Elinor Leslie as Mrs. Chance

== Bibliography ==
- Munden, Kenneth White. The American Film Institute Catalog of Motion Pictures Produced in the United States, Part 1. University of California Press, 1997.
