= Manhattan Knights =

1928 silent film

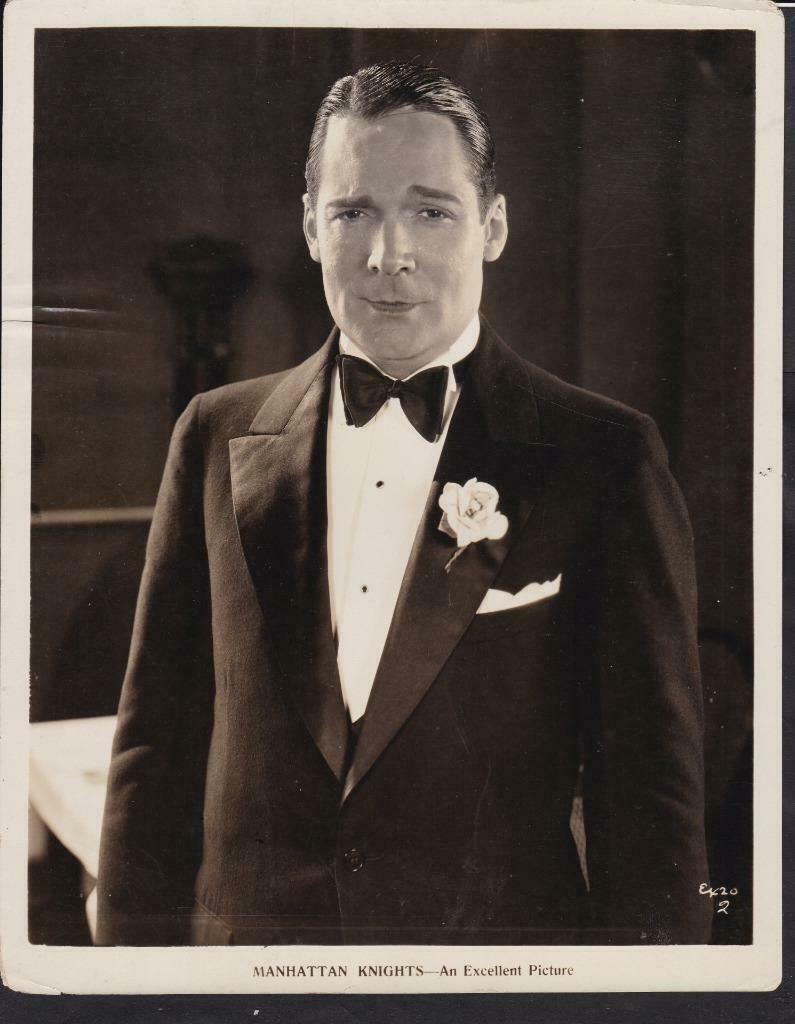
- Directed by: Burton L. King
- Written by: Adeline Leitzbach
- Produced by: Samuel Zierler
- Starring: Barbara Bedford; Walter Miller; Crauford Kent
- Cinematography: Walter Haas; Edward A. Kull
- Edited by: De Leon Anthony
- Production company: Excellent Pictures
- Distributed by: Excellent Pictures
- Release date: August 27, 1928
- Running time: 70 minutes
- Country: United States
- Languages: Silent; English intertitles

Manhattan Knights is a 1928 American silent drama film directed by Burton L. King and starring Barbara Bedford, Walter Miller and Crauford Kent.

When her brother loses fifty thousand dollars playing cards to three shady characters, Margaret attempts to recover the cheque he gave them which he can't afford to meet.

== Cast ==
- Barbara Bedford as Margaret
- Walter Miller as Robert Ferris
- Betty Worth as Julia
- Ray Hallor as James Barton
- Crauford Kent as Henry Ryder
- Eddie Boland as Chick Watson
- Noble Johnson as Doc Mellis
- Joseph Burke as Barry
- Leo White as Giuseppi

== Bibliography ==
- Munden, Kenneth White. The American Film Institute Catalog of Motion Pictures Produced in the United States, Part 1. University of California Press, 1997.
