= Hazel Jamieson =

American screenwriter

- Born: Hazel Marguerite Jamieson; June 20, 1892; Stillwater, Minnesota, USA
- Died: January 18, 1981 (aged 88); Bellevue, Washington, USA
- Occupation: Screenwriter

Hazel Jamieson was an American screenwriter known for her work in Hollywood during the 1920s and 1930s.

== Biography ==
Hazel was born in Stillwater, Minnesota, to John Jamieson and Sarah Brown. Both of her parents hailed from Canada. By 1930, she and her family had moved to Los Angeles, where she was employed in the scenario department at a film studio. Her first credit was on 1929's The Dream Melody. She was married twice: first to Frank Barnes and later to Harry Kraemer.

== Selected filmography ==
- Reform School (1939)
- Dangerous Waters (1936)
- The Dream Melody (1929)
