= The Forty-Niners (1932 film) =

1932 film

- Directed by: John P. McCarthy
- Written by: F. McGrew Willis
- Produced by: Burton King
- Starring: Tom Tyler; Betty Mack; Fern Emmett
- Cinematography: Edward Kull
- Edited by: Fred Bain
- Production company: A Monarch Production
- Distributed by: Freuler Film Associates, Inc.
- Release date: October 28, 1932
- Running time: 59 minutes
- Country: United States
- Language: English

The Forty-Niners is a 1932 American western film directed by John P. McCarthy and starring Tom Tyler, Betty Mack and Fern Emmett. It was a Monarch Production by a Poverty Row independent film company.

== Plot ==
In the mid-nineteenth century scout Squaw O'Hara is hired to take a wagon train west. However, he takes it off the trail so it can be attacked by his Indian allies. However, frontiersman Tennessee Matthews is wise to his game and sets out to foil his scheme.

== Cast ==
- Tom Tyler as Tennessee Matthews
- Betty Mack as Virginia Hawkins
- Al Bridge as O'Hara
- Fern Emmett as Widow Spriggs
- Gordon Wood as Jed Hawkins
- Mildred Rogers as Lola
- Fred Ritter as Tanner
- Frank Ball as MacNab
- Florence Wells as Tanner's wife

Uncredited

- Bob Card as Settler
- Joe De La Cruz as Renegade
- Bob Kortman as Settler

== Bibliography ==
- Pitts, Michael R. Poverty Row Studios, 1929–1940: An Illustrated History of 55 Independent Film Companies, with a Filmography for Each. McFarland & Company, 2005.
