= Fred Toones =

American actor and comedian (1906–1962)

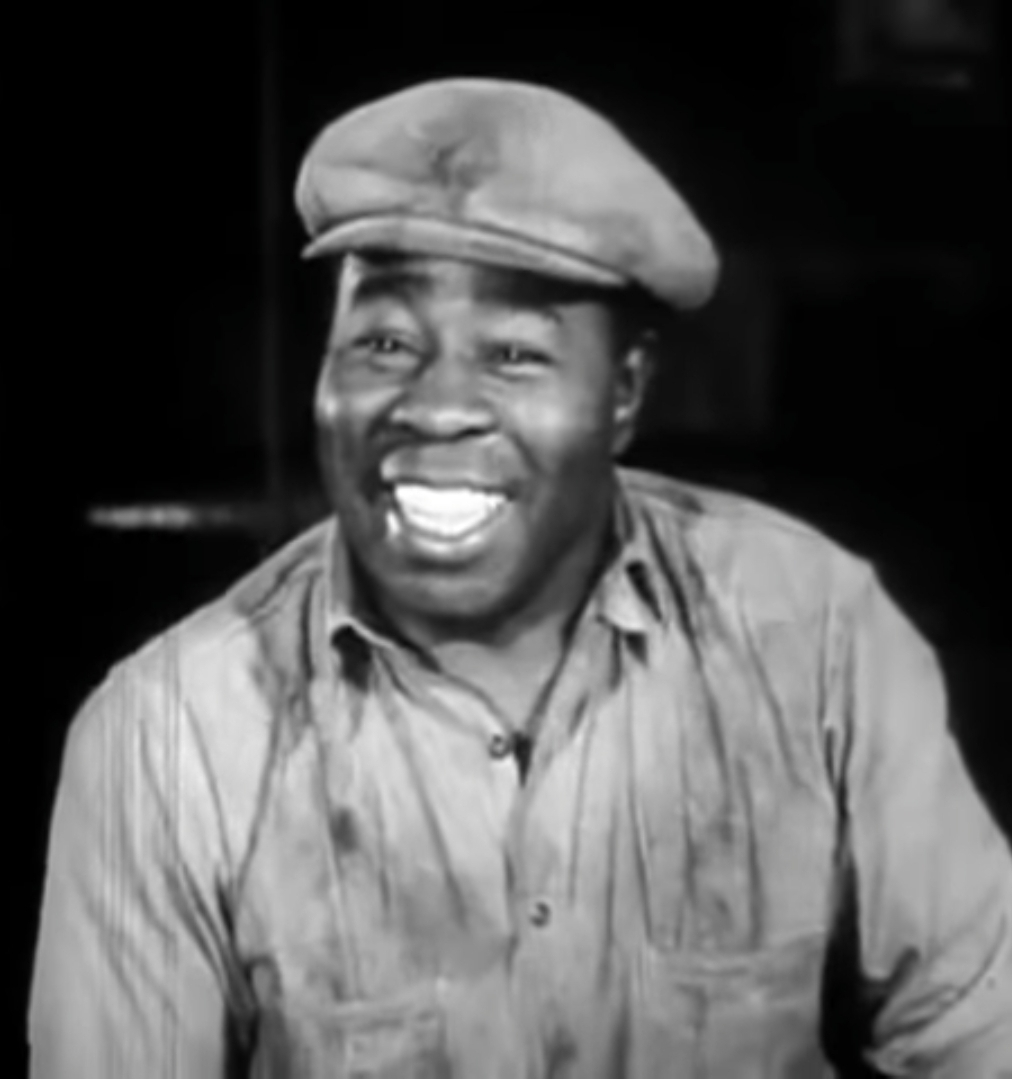
- Toones in Black Gold (1936)
- Born: January 5, 1906; North Carolina, U.S.
- Died: February 13, 1962 (aged 56); Los Angeles, California, U.S.
- Other names: Snowflake
- Occupations: Actor; comedian
- Years active: 1928–1951

Fred "Snowflake" Toones (January 5, 1906 – February 13, 1962) was an American actor and comedian. He appeared in over 200 films in his career spanning 23 years.

== Career ==
He appeared in over 200 films between 1928 and 1951. His standard characterization was that of a middle-aged "colored" man with a high-pitched voice and childlike demeanor. Like ‘Curly’ Howard and Tommy ‘Tiny’ Lister, who followed the black tradition of using an antonymous nickname as both their professional name and character name, "Snowflake" was the distinct stage name by which Toones was best known, and he used this name as his credit as early as his third film, 1931's Shanghaied Love. Likewise, in Shanghaied Love and over 35 other films, “Snowflake” was also Toones’ character name.

Toones acted in films such as Here Comes the Navy (1934) with James Cagney, Go Into Your Dance (1935) with Al Jolson and Ruby Keeler, Mississippi (1935), Hawk of the Wilderness (1938), and Daredevils of the Red Circle (1939) with Bruce Bennett and in many "B" westerns such as The Lawless Nineties (1936) with John Wayne. He also appeared in dozens of two-reelers such as Columbia's Woman Haters (1934) and Sock-a-Bye Baby (1942) with the Three Stooges, and had a bit role in Laurel and Hardy's feature Way Out West (1937). Toones is also a familiar face in classic comedies, including Howard Hawks’ Twentieth Century (1934) and three Preston Sturges comedies: Remember the Night (1940), Christmas in July (1940) and The Palm Beach Story (1942).

Toones first appeared as a porter in 1932 in The Hurricane Express, and was usually typecast as a porter – appearing in over 50 films in such a role. He also played a variety of other service-oriented or domestic worker roles such as stable grooms, janitors, elevator operators, valets, cooks, bellhops, doormen, butlers, and bartenders.

Toones played a bootblack or shoeshine man in at least six of his movies, and in film director William Witney's autobiography, Witney reveals that in addition to playing supporting roles and bit parts, Toones actually ran the shoeshine stand at Republic Studios.

His being cast in only comedic bit parts and small nonsupporting roles meant his efforts were more often than not uncredited (of 210 films where he made an appearance, he was credited in 73 of them).

Toones died on February 13, 1962, in Los Angeles, California.

== Partial filmography ==
- Ladies' Night in a Turkish Bath (1928) (uncredited)
- Shanghaied Love (1931)
- A Private Scandal (1931)
- Mark of the Spur (1932)
- The Arm of the Law (1932)
- Police Court (1932)
- Single-Handed Sanders (1932)
- The County Fair (1932)
- I Am a Fugitive from a Chain Gang (1932) (uncredited)
- Out of Singapore (1932)
- Human Targets (1932)
- Before Midnight (1933)
- Central Airport (1933) (uncredited)
- Golddiggers of 1933 (1933) (uncredited)
- Palooka (1934)
- Here Comes the Navy (1934) (uncredited)
- Woman Haters (1934; first Three Stooges short) (uncredited)
- Twentieth Century (1934) (uncredited)
- Murder in the Private Car (1934)
- Valley of Wanted Men (1935)
- Speed Limited (1935)
- Riddle Ranch (1935)
- Frontier Justice (1935)
- Come and Get It (1936)
- Hell-Ship Morgan (1936)
- The Lawless Nineties (1936)
- Desert Justice (1936)
- Hair-Trigger Casey (1936)
- The Lonely Trail (1936)
- Oh, Susanna! (1936)
- Racing Blood (1936)
- Born to Fight (1936)
- A Star Is Born (1937) (uncredited)
- Yodelin' Kid from Pine Ridge (1937)
- Range Defenders (1937)
- Under the Big Top (1938)
- Hawk of the Wilderness (1938 serial)
- Dodge City (1939) (uncredited)
- Daredevils of the Red Circle (1939 serial)
- Mr. Smith Goes to Washington (1939) (uncredited)
- Remember the Night (1940)
- Christmas in July (1940)
- The Biscuit Eater (1940)
- The Great American Broadcast (1941) (uncredited)
- The Great Man's Lady (1942)
- Give Out, Sisters (1942)
- The Palm Beach Story (1942)
- Haunted Ranch (1943)
- Land of Hunted Men (1943)
- The Lost Weekend (1945) (uncredited)
- Fool's Gold (1947)
- Bells of San Angelo (1947)

== See also ==
- Willie Best (billed in five films as "Sleep 'n' Eat")
- Stepin Fetchit
- Mantan Moreland
