= Dangerous Traffic =

1926 film

- Directed by: Bennett Cohen
- Written by: Bennett Cohen
- Produced by: Otto K. Schreier
- Starring: Francis X. Bushman Jr. Mildred Harris; Jack Perrin; Tom London
- Distributed by: Goodwill Pictures
- Release date: June 7, 1926
- Running time: 54 minutes
- Country: United States
- Languages: Silent film English intertitles

Dangerous Traffic is a 1926 American dramatic, action silent film directed by Bennett Cohen and starring Francis X. Bushman Jr. and Mildred Harris.

A preserved film available on DVD.

== Plot ==
A young reporter for the small coastal California village newspaper Seaside Record, Ned Charters (Francis X. Bushman Jr.) begins to investigate the criminal activities of a gang of liquor smugglers after two revenue agents Tom Kennedy (Jack Perrin) and Harvey Leonard (Hal Walters) are caught in a shoot-out. Tom survives the attack, but Harvey is killed. Harvey's young sister Helen Leonard (Mildred Harris), who works as a cigarette girl at the gang's local hangout, the Surfridge Inn, vows revenge and begins to assist Ned in his investigation of the smugglers. After Tom Kennedy recovers he joins the trio in bringing the gang to justice. Along the way, car chases and gun battles ensue, with Ned at one point jumping from a speeding motorcycle to intercept a runaway automobile. By film's end, the gang of smugglers is imprisoned and Ned and Helen have found true love with one another.

== Cast ==
- Francis X. Bushman Jr. - Ned Charters
- Jack Perrin - Tom Kennedy
- Mildred Harris - Helen Leonard
- Tom London - Marc Brandon
- Ethan Laidlaw - Foxy Jim Stone
- Hal Walters - Harvey Leonard
