= Man of Action (film) =

- Lobby card
- Directed by: George Melford
- Screenplay by: Robert Quiqley
- Story by: William Colt MacDonald
- Starring: Tim McCoy; Caryl Lincoln; Julian Rivero
- Cinematography: John W. Boyle
- Edited by: Otto Meyer
- Production company: Columbia Pictures
- Distributed by: Columbia Pictures
- Release date: January 20, 1933
- Running time: 57 minutes
- Country: United States
- Language: English

Man of Action is a 1933 Western film directed by George Melford for Columbia Pictures.

== Cast ==
- Tim McCoy as Tim Barlowe
- Caryl Lincoln as Irene Sherman
- Julian Rivero as Don Miguel y Guillermo Pablo Pancho Castrano de Villero
- Wheeler Oakman as Sheriff Norton
- Walter Brennan as Summers
- Joseph W. Girard as President Frank Caldwell
- Stanley Blystone as Kit Masters
- Ted Adams as Red Deever
- Charles K. French as Doctor James Duncan

== Reception ==
A 1933 review in the Bristol Herald Courier called the film one of Tim McCoy's best films, and praised one of the fight scenes.

A contemporary review in the Marshall Democrat-News was also positive.
