= Barriers of the Law =

1925 film directed by J. P. McGowan

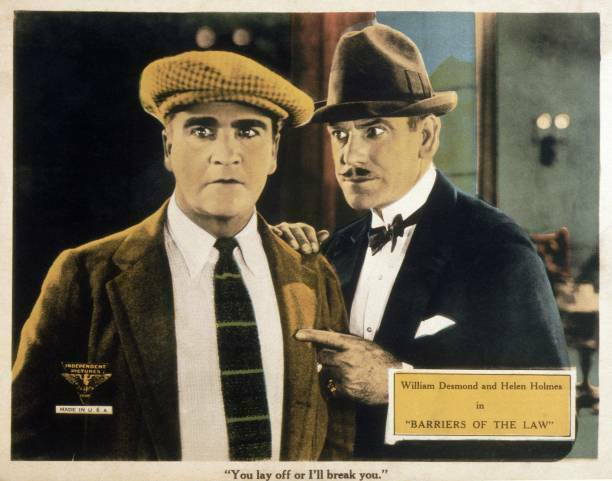
- Directed by: J.P. McGowan
- Written by: William Berke; Travers Vale
- Produced by: Jesse J. Goldburg
- Starring: J.P. McGowan; Helen Holmes; William Desmond
- Cinematography: Walter L. Griffin
- Production company: Independent Pictures
- Distributed by: Independent Pictures; Ideal Films (UK)
- Release date: March 27, 1925
- Running time: 50 minutes
- Country: United States
- Languages: Silent; English intertitles

Barriers of the Law is a 1925 American silent crime film directed by J.P. McGowan and starring McGowan, Helen Holmes and William Desmond.

== Synopsis ==
Rita Wingate a former bootlegger changes side with law enforcement official Rex Brandon against her former boss, gang leader Steve Redding. Redding now sets out to silence her from providing evidence against her.

== Cast ==
- J.P. McGowan as Steve Redding
- Helen Holmes as Rita Wingate
- William Desmond as Rex Brandon
- Albert J. Smith as Aide to Redding
- Norma Wills as Annie
- Marguerite Clayton as Leila Larkin

== Bibliography ==
- Connelly, Robert B. The Silents: Silent Feature Films, 1910-36, Volume 40, Issue 2. December Press, 1998.
- Munden, Kenneth White. The American Film Institute Catalog of Motion Pictures Produced in the United States, Part 1. University of California Press, 1997.
