= Breezy Bill =

1930 film directed by J.P. McGowan

- Directed by: J.P. McGowan
- Written by: Sally Winters
- Starring: Bob Steele; Bud Osborne
- Cinematography: Hap Depew
- Edited by: Arthur A. Brooks
- Production company: Big Productions Film Corporation
- Distributed by: Syndicate Film Exchange
- Release date: January 24, 1930
- Running time: 50 minutes
- Country: United States
- Language: English

Breezy Bill is a 1930 American Western film pre-Code directed by J.P. McGowan and starring Bob Steele and Bud Osborne. It was produced as an independent second feature on Poverty Row.

== Cast ==
- Bob Steele as Breezy Bill
- Edna Aslin as Barbara Pennypincher
- Alfred Hewston as Henry Pennypincher
- George Hewston as Gabe Pennypincher
- Perry Murdock as Gabe's Son
- J.P. McGowan as Sheriff
- Bud Osborne as Bandit
- Cliff Lyons as Bandit

== Bibliography ==
- Pitts, Michael R. Poverty Row Studios, 1929–1940. McFarland & Company, 2005.
