= The Gambling Sex =

1932 film

- Directed by: Fred C. Newmeyer
- Written by: F. McGrew Willis
- Produced by: John R. Freuler; Burton L. King
- Starring: Ruth Hall; Grant Withers; Maston Williams
- Cinematography: Edward A. Kull
- Edited by: Fred Bain
- Production company: Monarch Film Corporation
- Distributed by: Freuler Film Associates
- Release date: November 21, 1932
- Running time: 60 minutes
- Country: United States
- Language: English

The Gambling Sex is a 1932 American drama film directed by Fred C. Newmeyer and starring Ruth Hall, Grant Withers and Maston Williams.

== Plot ==
A wealthy young woman becomes addicted to gambling, suffering increasingly heavy losses.

== Cast ==
- Ruth Hall as Sheila Tracy
- Grant Withers as Bill Foster
- Maston Williams as Ralph Jordan
- John St. Polis as John Tracy
- Jean Porter as Daisy
- James Eagles as Sandy Lane - Jockey (as Jimmy Eagles)
- Murdock MacQuarrie as Thompson
- Ted Adams as Mason - Manager of Gambling Club
- Jack Cheatham as Gambling Club Cashier
- Henry Hall as Doctor
- Duke R. Lee as Roulette Croupier
- George Morrell as Night Club Waiter

== Bibliography ==
- Parish, James Robert & Pitts, Michael R. Film directors: a guide to their American films. Scarecrow Press, 1974.
- Pitts, Michael R. Poverty Row Studios, 1929-1940. McFarland & Company, 2005.
