= Outwitted (1925 film) =

1925 film directed by J. P. McGowan

- Directed by: J. P. McGowan
- Written by: J. P. McGowan
- Produced by: Jesse J. Goldburg
- Starring: Helen Holmes; William Desmond; J. P. McGowan
- Cinematography: Walter Griffin
- Edited by: Betty Davis
- Production company: Independent Pictures
- Release date: January 21, 1925 (US)
- Running time: 5 reels
- Country: United States
- Language: English

Outwitted is a 1925 American silent melodrama film, written and directed by J. P. McGowan. It stars Helen Holmes, William Desmond, and J. P. McGowan, and was released on January 21, 1925.

== Cast ==
- Helen Holmes as Helen Kinney
- William Desmond as Jack Blaisdel
- J. P. McGowan as Tiger McGuire
- Grace Cunard as Lucy Carlisle
- Alec B. Francis as John Kinney
- Emily Fitzroy as Meg
