= The Man from New Mexico =

1932 film directed by J.P. McGowan

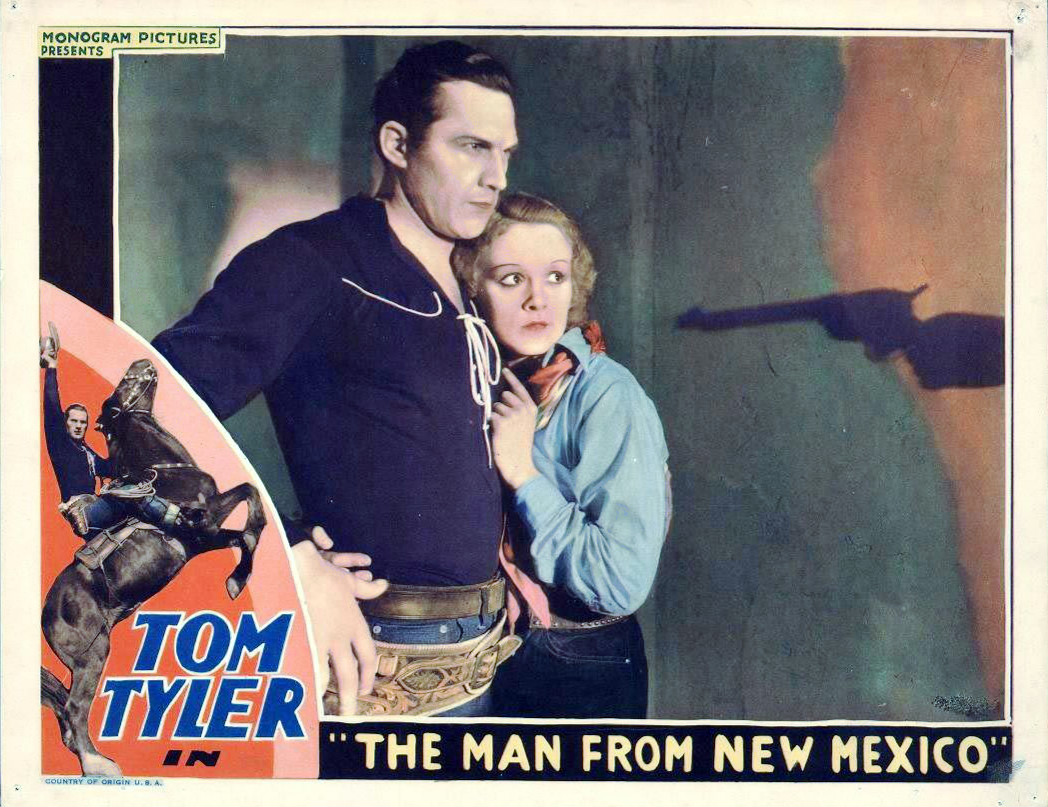
- Directed by: J.P. McGowan
- Written by: Frederick Ryter (story); Harry O. Hoyt
- Produced by: Trem Carr; Burton L. King
- Starring: Tom Tyler; Caryl Lincoln; Robert D. Walker
- Cinematography: Edward A. Kull
- Edited by: Fred Bain
- Production company: Trem Carr Pictures
- Distributed by: Monogram Pictures
- Release date: April 1, 1932
- Running time: 54 minutes
- Country: United States
- Language: English

The Man from New Mexico is a 1932 American pre-Code Western film directed by J.P. McGowan and starring Tom Tyler, Caryl Lincoln and Robert D. Walker.

== Cast ==
- Tom Tyler as Jess Ryder
- Caryl Lincoln as Sally Langton
- Robert D. Walker as Mort Snyder
- Jack Richardson as Jim Fletcher
- Lafe McKee as Sheriff
- Frank Ball as 'Dad' Langton
- Lewis Sargent as Bob Langton
- Blackie Whiteford as Henchman Bat Murchison
- Slim Whitaker as Henchman Russ
- Frederick Ryter as Pancho
- Jack Long as Hank
- William L. Nolte as Henchman Slink
- C.V. Bussey as Bud
- Lee Tinn as Ching

== Bibliography ==
- Martin, Len D. The Allied Artists Checklist: The Feature Films and Short Subjects of Allied Artists Pictures Corporation, 1947-1978. McFarland & Company, 1993.
