= Jesse J. Goldburg =

American film producer (1881–1959)

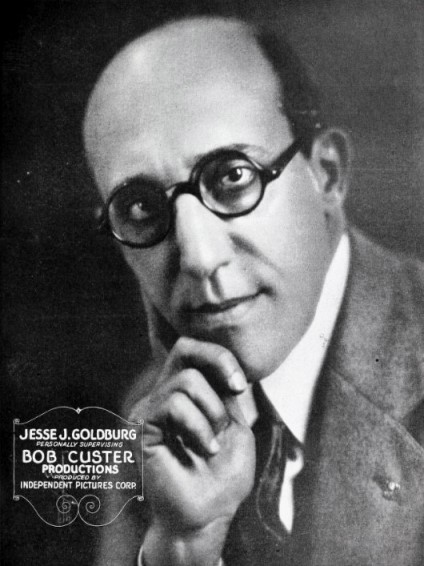
- Goldburg in 1925
- Born: October 21, 1881; New York, New York, United States
- Died: August 27, 1959 (aged 77); Hollywood, California, United States
- Occupations: Writer, Producer
- Years active: 1915–1927 (film)

Jesse J. Goldburg (1881 – 1959) was an American film script writer and film producer active during the silent era. In 1924 he managed the low-budget company Independent Pictures Corp. based at a studio on Sunset Boulevard.

The main stars of his Western films were Franklyn Farnum, Bill Cody and Bob Custer. One of his later productions, No Man's Law included Oliver Hardy as a villain with an eye patch who meets his just deserts.

He produced films for other companies such as Beyond the Rockies for Robertson-Cole.

In 1937 he became the successful distributor for Edgar Rice Burroughs's 12-part serial The New Adventures of Tarzan with Herman Brix, when Burroughs-Tarzan Enterprises company had fallen into debt.

== Selected filmography ==
- Life Without Soul (1915)
- The Curious Conduct of Judge Legarde (1915)
- The Profiteer (1919)
- A Desperate Adventure (1924)
- Flashing Spurs (1924)
- Dangerous Pleasure (1924)
- Trigger Fingers (1924)
- Galloping Vengeance (1925)
- The Texas Bearcat (1925)
- The Bloodhound (1925)
- Dangerous Odds (1925)
- Barriers of the Law (1925)
- That Man Jack! (1925)
- A Man of Nerve (1925)
- Border Intrigue (1925)
- Blood and Steel (1925)
- Duped (1925)
- Riders of Mystery (1925)
- The Ridin' Streak (1925)
- Accused (1925)
- Billy the Kid (1925)
- The Gambling Fool (1925)
- Outwitted (1925)
- Beyond the Rockies (1926)
- Sunshine of Paradise Alley (1926)
- The Dead Line (1926)
- The Dude Cowboy (1926)
- Hair-Trigger Baxter (1926)
- The Valley of Bravery (1926)
- Bulldog Pluck (1927)
- The Fighting Hombre (1927)
- Life of an Actress (1927)
- Driven from Home (1927)
- No Man's Law (1927)

== Bibliography ==
- Stephens, E.J. & Wanamaker, Marc. Early Poverty Row Studios. Arcadia Publishing, 2014.
- Slide, Anthony. The New Historical Dictionary of the American Film Industry. Routledge, 2014.
