= Boots Malone =

1952 film

- Directed by: William Dieterle
- Written by: Milton Holmes
- Produced by: Milton Holmes
- Starring: William Holden; Johnny Stewart
- Cinematography: Charles Lawton Jr.
- Edited by: Al Clark
- Music by: Elmer Bernstein
- Production company: Columbia Pictures
- Distributed by: Columbia Pictures
- Release dates: December 29, 1951 (Preview); March 12, 1952 (New York)
- Running time: 104 minutes
- Country: United States
- Language: English

Boots Malone is a 1952 American drama film directed by William Dieterle. It stars William Holden as a sports agent and Johnny Stewart as a rich runaway who wants to become a jockey.

== Plot ==
Down on his luck, jockey agent "Boots" Malone is at a diner with his friend "Stash" Clements when teenage runaway Thomas Gibson Jr. tries to pay for his meal with a $100 bill. Interested in the money himself, Boots takes the boy under his wing. Tommy is eager to become a jockey, so he offers to pay Boots to train him.

Boots, Stash and "Preacher" Cole have their eyes on a promising horse named White Cargo. They fix it so that he performs badly at his next workout. As a result, the owner places the horse for auction, and they buy him.

One day, White Cargo is startled and bolts with Tommy on his back, showing that the boy has some talent. Boots lets Tommy ride in a race but does not tell him that they have secretly weighed White Cargo down in order to secure better odds for their bets in a later race. The horse fares poorly, upsetting Tommy. To restore his confidence, Boots has him ride in another race on a different horse, and he wins.

As the big race approaches, Boots tangles with a private detective hired by Tommy's mother, a wealthy businesswoman, to find her boy. Boots reluctantly calls her and tells her where to collect her son. Disapproving of Boots, she convinces Tommy that Boots turned him in for the $5,000 reward. However, Tommy returns to Boots in time for the race, and they reconcile. When Mrs. Gibson calls, Boots warns her that she will lose the love of her son if she prevents him from racing.

Matson, a gangster to whom Boots owes money, tells him to throw the race, as Matson has bet heavily on another horse. Boots tries to convince Tommy to agree, but he does not have the heart to spoil what may Tommy's last ride, and White Cargo wins. Tommy boards a train to return to school. When Boots is warned that Matson and his men are awaiting him, he jumps aboard the train.

== Cast ==
- William Holden as "Boots" Malone
- Johnny Stewart as Thomas Gibson Jr.
- Stanley Clements as "Stash" Clements
- Basil Ruysdael as "Preacher" Cole
- Carl Benton Reid as John Williams
- Ralph Dumke as Beckett
- Ed Begley as Howard Whitehead
- Hugh Sanders as Matson
- Harry Morgan as "Quarter Horse" Henry (as Henry Morgan)
- Ann Lee as Mrs. Gibson
- Anthony Caruso as Joe
- Billy Pearson as Eddie Koch
- Emory Parnell as Evans (uncredited)

== Release ==
Boots Malone was previewed in several American cities on December 29, 1951 before its general release in early January 1952.

== Reception ==
In a contemporary review for The New York Times, critic Bosley Crowther wrote: "Outside or a dubious bit of fiction about the boarding-school origins of a kid who aspires to become a jockey and the stitching of a fixed race in the plot, this tale of a busted jockey agent's discovery and training of a new boy hews close to a line of frank reporting and dramatic plausibility. ... [T]he plain old movie-goer or the fellow who hangs on the rail should be happy to have his money going on this charging 'Boots Malone.'"

== See also ==
- List of films about horses
- List of films about horse racing
