= War of the Range =

1933 film

- Directed by: J.P. McGowan
- Written by: Oliver Drake
- Produced by: Burton L. King
- Starring: Tom Tyler; Charles K. French; Lane Chandler
- Cinematography: Edward A. Kull
- Edited by: Fred Bain
- Production company: Monarch Film Corporation
- Distributed by: Freuler Film Associates
- Release date: September 22, 1933
- Running time: 59 minutes
- Country: United States
- Language: English

War of the Range is a 1933 American pre-Code Western film directed by J.P. McGowan and starring Tom Tyler, Charles K. French and Lane Chandler. It was the last of the Tom Tyler Westerns made by the independent Poverty Row company the Monarch Film Corporation.

== Cast ==
- Tom Tyler as Tom Bradley
- Charles K. French as Duke Bradley
- Ted Adams as Jim Warren
- Lane Chandler as Henchman Bull Harris
- Caryl Lincoln as Grace Carlysle
- William Malan as Dad Carlysle
- Wesley Giraud as Jimmy Carlysle
- Fred Burns as Sheriff Ben Barlow
- Slim Whitaker as Henchman Hank
- Billy Franey as Tony
- Lafe McKee as Cattle Buyer Cartwright

== Bibliography ==
- Pitts, Michael R. Western Movies: A Guide to 5,105 Feature Films. McFarland, 2012.
