= Blackie Whiteford =

American actor (1889–1962)

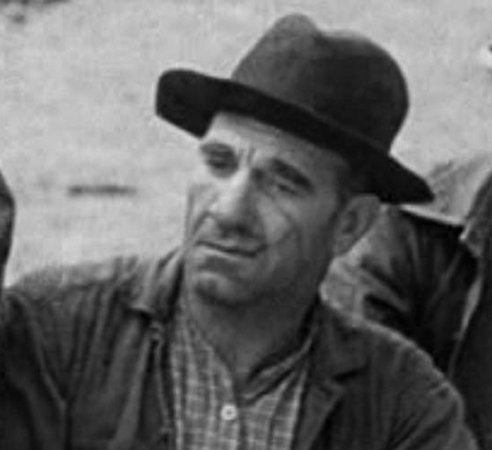
- Born: John Penman Whiteford; April 27, 1889; New York City, U.S.
- Died: March 21, 1962 (aged 72); Hollywood, Los Angeles, U.S.
- Occupation: Actor
- Years active: 1928–1962
- Spouse(s): Estelle Wills (divorced); Alma Bennett (m.1954–1958; her death)

John Penman "Blackie" Whiteford (April 27, 1889 – March 21, 1962) was an American film actor.

== Biography ==
In 1903, Whiteford was a seaman between jobs when he was offered a chance to work on The Great Train Robbery film. That opportunity launched his cinematic career, which he claimed eventually included more than 2,000 films (though more likely to have been several hundred). Whiteford appeared in more than 350 films between 1928 and 1962. A career character actor, Whiteford is best known for appearing in 28 films with The Three Stooges between 1936 and 1956.

Whiteford was reportedly married to Estelle Wills, an actress, though this may have been a so-called common-law marriage. Whiteford remarried in 1954 to actress Alma Bennett. His interment was at Valhalla Memorial Park Cemetery with an unmarked grave.

== Selected filmography ==
- The Way of the Strong (1928) (uncredited)
- The Tiger's Shadow (1928)
- The Utah Kid (1930) (uncredited)
- Code of Honor (1930)
- The Cyclone Kid (1931)
- The Man from New Mexico (1932)
- Mark of the Spur (1932)
- Malay Nights (1932)
- The Scarlet Brand (1932)
- Breed of the Border (1933) (uncredited)
- King Kong (1933) - Member of Ship's Crew (uncredited)
- St. Louis Woman (1934)
- The Brand of Hate (1934)
- When Lightning Strikes (1934)
- Big Calibre (1935) (uncredited)
- Texas Jack (1935)
- Whoops, I'm an Indian! (1936)
- Grips, Grunts and Groans (1937)
- Valley of Terror (1937)
- The Last Horseman (1944)
- Riding West (1944)
- Sailor's Holiday (1944)
- The Lone Hand Texan (1947) (uncredited)
- Out West (1947)
- Hold That Lion! (1947) - Train passenger (uncredited)
- Crime on Their Hands (1948)
- The Traveling Saleswoman (1950) - Stock Footage Outlaw (uncredited)
- Three Hams on Rye (1950)
- Smoky Canyon (1952) - Townsman (uncredited)
- Up in Daisy's Penthouse (1953)
- Pals and Gals (1954)
- The Phantom Stagecoach (1957) - Townsman (uncredited)
