= Blood and Steel (1925 film) =

1925 film directed by J. P. McGowan

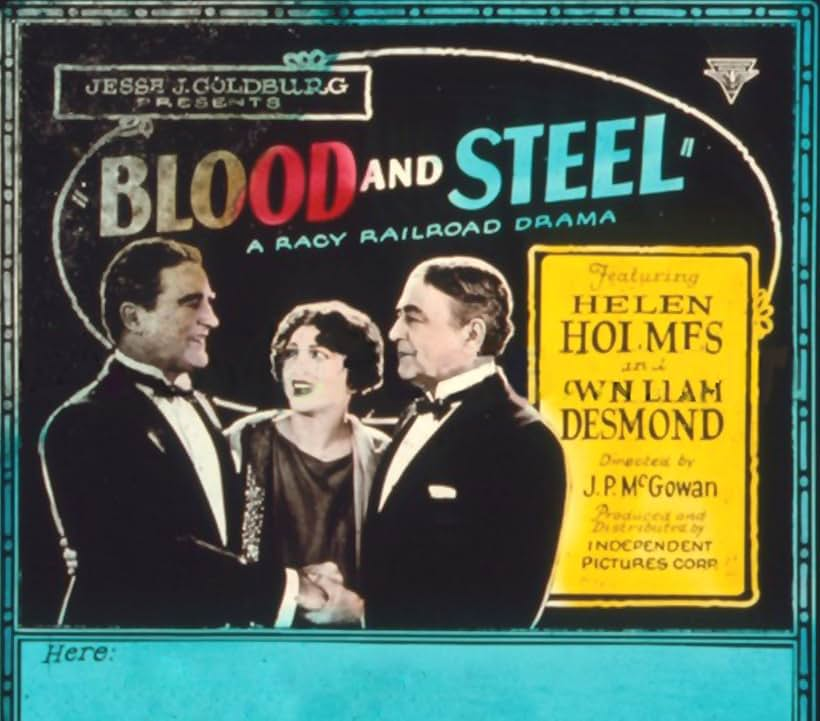
- Lantern slide
- Directed by: J.P. McGowan
- Written by: George H. Plympton
- Produced by: Jesse J. Goldburg
- Starring: Helen Holmes; William Desmond; Robert Edeson
- Cinematography: Roland Price
- Edited by: Betty Davis
- Production company: Independent Pictures
- Distributed by: Independent Pictures
- Release date: May 29, 1925
- Running time: 50 minutes
- Country: United States
- Language: Silent (English intertitles)

Blood and Steel is a 1925 American silent Western film directed by J.P. McGowan and starring Helen Holmes, William Desmond, and Robert Edeson.

== Synopsis ==
A railroad president constructing a line in the West heads out to investigate the delays that have plagued the project. He becomes aware that his own assistant is working in league with a rival company to obstruct the new railroad.

== Cast ==
- Helen Holmes as Helen Grimshaw
- William Desmond as Gordon Steele
- Robert Edeson as W.L. Grimshaw
- Mack V. Wright as Devore Palmer
- Albert J. Smith as Jurgin
- Ruth Stonehouse as Vera
- C.L. Sherwood as The Cook
- Bill Cody as Tommy
- Walter Fitzroy as Mr. Steele

== Preservation ==
A print of Blood and Steel is held in the film holdings of EmGee Film Library and in a private collection. The film is available on DVD paired with The Arizona Express

== Bibliography ==
- Connelly, Robert B. The Silents: Silent Feature Films, 1910-36, Volume 40, Issue 2. December Press, 1998.
- Munden, Kenneth White. The American Film Institute Catalog of Motion Pictures Produced in the United States, Part 1. University of California Press, 1997.
