= Jack Cheatham =

American actor (1894–1971)

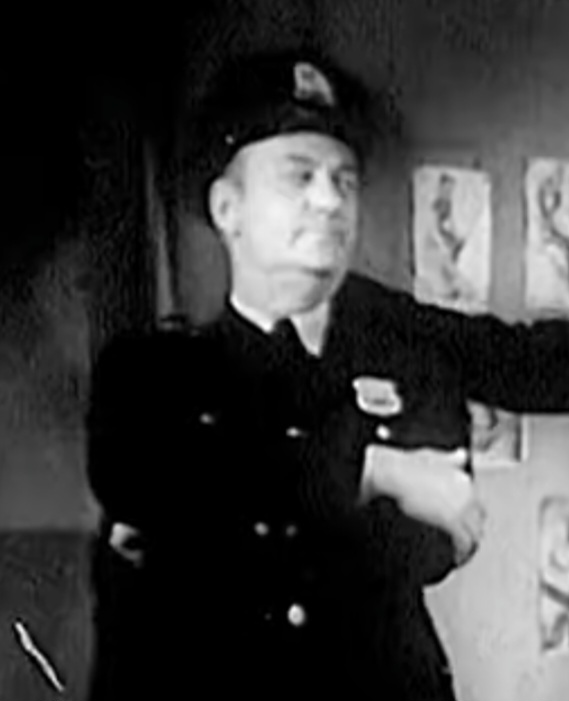
- Cheatham in A Fig Leaf for Eve (1944)
- Born: John Preston Cheatham; December 28, 1894; Jackson, Mississippi, U.S.
- Died: March 30, 1971 (aged 76); La Mirada, California, U.S.
- Resting place: Rose Hills Memorial Park, Whittier, California
- Occupation: Actor
- Years active: 1928–1949
- Spouse: Ewell Malone

John Preston Cheatham (December 28, 1894 – March 30, 1971) was an American character actor of the 1930s and 1940s. During his career he appeared in almost 200 films, with 100 of them being features.

== Life and career ==
Born John Preston Cheatham on December 28, 1894, in Jackson, Mississippi, he began acting in the 1920s, including two Broadway appearances. In 1928 he would appear in the successful Diamond Lil, written by and starring Mae West. Cheatham entered the film industry with his performance in a featured role in 1931's Shanghaied Love, starring Richard Cromwell, Noah Beery, and Sally Blane.

Notable films in which Cheatham appeared include: The Whole Town's Talking (1935), starring Edward G. Robinson and Jean Arthur; The Petrified Forest (1936), starring Leslie Howard, Humphrey Bogart, and Bette Davis; Frank Capra's 1936 comedy, Mr. Deeds Goes to Town, starring Gary Cooper and Jean Arthur; the classic Meet John Doe (1941), directed by Capra and starring Gary Cooper and Barbara Stanwyck; Alfred Hitchcock's 1942 suspense drama, Saboteur, starring Priscilla Lane and Robert Cummings; the 1946 comedy, The Kid from Brooklyn, starring Danny Kaye and Virginia Mayo; and another Danny Kaye and Virginia Mayo vehicle, 1947's The Secret Life of Walter Mitty. Cheatham's final screen performance was in a small role in Michael Curtiz' 1949 melodrama, Flamingo Road, starring Joan Crawford.

Cheatham was married to Ewell "Elaine" Malone. He died on March 30, 1971, in La Mirada, California, and was buried next to his wife in Rose Hills Memorial Park, in Whittier, California.

== Selected filmography ==
- Alias Mary Smith (1932)
- The Gambling Sex (1932)
- The Pride of the Legion (1932)
- Murder in the Private Car (1934) (uncredited)
- His Fighting Blood (1935)
- Skybound (1935)
- The Drag-Net (1936)
- No Greater Sin (1941)
- Caught in the Act (1941)
- Saboteur (1942) - Detective Outside Movie Theater (uncredited)
- The Hat Box Mystery (1947)
