= Quick Trigger Lee =

1931 film directed by J. P. McGowan

- Directed by: J. P. McGowan
- Written by: George Morgan
- Produced by: Burton King
- Starring: Raymond Glenn; Caryl Lincoln; Monte Montague
- Cinematography: Edward A. Kull
- Edited by: Fred Bain
- Production company: Big 4 Film Corp
- Release date: November 24, 1931 (US)
- Running time: 60 minutes
- Country: United States
- Language: English

Quick Trigger Lee is a 1931 American pre-Code Western film. Directed by J. P. McGowan, the film stars Raymond Glenn, Caryl Lincoln, and Monte Montague. It was released on November 24, 1931.

== Cast list ==
- Raymond Glenn as Phil "Quick Trigger" Lee (credited as Bob Custer)
- Caryl Lincoln as Rose Campbell
- Monte Montague as Sammy Wales
- Leander de Cordova as Jeremy Wales (credited as Lee De Cordova)
- Richard Carlyle as John "Dad" Saunders
- Frank Ellis as Pete
- Al Taylor

== Plot ==
Quick Trigger Lee features a film within a film. A film crew interrupts the Wales gang before it can ambush Lee, who is on his way to help an old prospector. Lee manages to get the gang jailed while becoming romantically involved with the film company's leading lady (Campbell), and he discovers that she is the prospector's long-lost niece.
