= The Penal Code =

1932 film

- Directed by: George Melford
- Written by: F. Hugh Herbert; Edward T. Lowe Jr. (story)
- Produced by: Burton L. King (producer); John R. Freuler (executive producer) (uncredited)
- Starring: See below
- Cinematography: Edward A. Kull
- Edited by: Frederick Bain
- Release date: 1932
- Running time: 62 minutes
- Country: United States
- Language: English

The Penal Code is a 1932 American crime drama film directed by George Melford.

== Plot ==
A man serves time in prison, going to disguise his whereabouts from his family. After he is released a blackmail scheme ensues.

== Cast ==
- Regis Toomey as Robert Palmer
- Helen Cohan as Marguerite ("Margie") Shannon
- Patrick H. O'Malley Jr. as Sergeant Detective W. J. Bender
- Robert Ellis as James Forrester
- Virginia True Boardman as Mrs. Sarah Palmer
- Henry Hall as Mr. Shannon
- Leander De Cordova as Isaac Lewin
- John Ince as Warden
- Murdock MacQuarrie as Lefty
- Olin Francis as McCarthy
