= Mark of the Spur =

1932 film

- Directed by: J.P. McGowan
- Written by: Frederick Chapin
- Produced by: Burton L. King
- Starring: Bob Custer; Lillian Rich; George Chesebro
- Cinematography: Edward A. Kull
- Edited by: Fred Bain
- Production company: Burton King Productions
- Distributed by: Big 4 Film Corporation
- Release date: February 10, 1932
- Running time: 59 minutes
- Country: United States
- Language: English

Mark of the Spur is a 1932 American pre-Code Western film directed by J.P. McGowan and starring Bob Custer, Lillian Rich and George Chesebro.

== Cast ==
- Bob Custer as The Kid
- Lillian Rich as Alice - Beckett's Adopted Daughter
- George Chesebro as John Beckett
- Lafe McKee as 'Hardshell' Beckett
- Adabelle Driver as Mrs. Beckett
- Franklyn Farnum as Sheriff Jake Ludlow
- Blackie Whiteford as Butch - Henchman
- Bud Osborne as Buzzard - Henchman
- Charles Edler as Deputy Sleepy
- Frank Ball as Station Agent
- Horace B. Carpenter as Doc
- Jack Hendricks as Tex - Ranch Hand
- Jack Kirk as Singer
- Jack Long as Slim
- Fred 'Snowflake' Toones as Ranch Cook

== Bibliography ==
- Michael R. Pitts. Poverty Row Studios, 1929–1940: An Illustrated History of 55 Independent Film Companies, with a Filmography for Each. McFarland & Company, 2005.
