= Tangled Fortunes =

1932 film

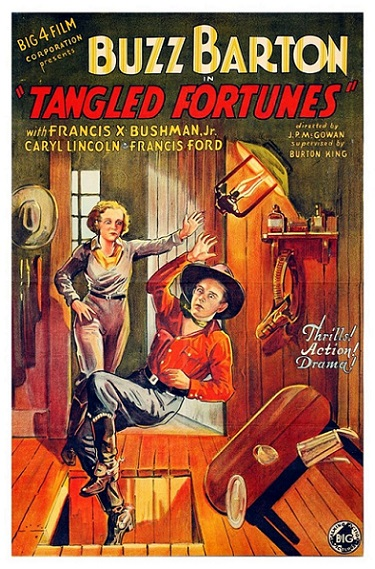
- Directed by: J.P. McGowan
- Written by: George Morgan
- Produced by: Burton L. King
- Starring: Buzz Barton; Francis X. Bushman Jr.; Caryl Lincoln
- Cinematography: Edward A. Kull
- Edited by: Fred Bain
- Production company: Big 4 Film Corporation
- Distributed by: Big 4 Film Corporation
- Release date: March 22, 1932
- Running time: 60 minutes
- Country: United States
- Language: English

Tangled Fortunes is a 1932 American pre-Code Western film directed by J.P. McGowan and starring Buzz Barton, Francis X. Bushman Jr. and Caryl Lincoln.

== Cast ==
- Buzz Barton as Buzz Davis
- Francis X. Bushman Jr. as Jim Collins
- Caryl Lincoln as Sally Martin
- Edmund Cobb as Buck Logan
- Charles Herzinger as Andy Wiggins
- Frank Ball as John (Pap) Davis
- Francis Ford as Matt Higgins
- Jack Long as Lefty
- C.V. Bussey as Chris
- Ezelle Poule as Betty

== Bibliography ==
- Michael R. Pitts. Poverty Row Studios, 1929–1940: An Illustrated History of 55 Independent Film Companies, with a Filmography for Each. McFarland & Company, 2005.
