= Edward A. Kull =

American film director

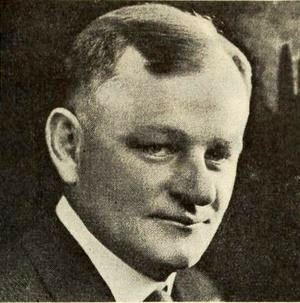
- Kull in 1921
- Born: December 10, 1885; Chicago, Illinois
- Died: December 22, 1946 (aged 61); Hollywood, California
- Occupations: Cinematographer; Film director
- Years active: 1907–1946

Adolph Edward Kull, better known as Edward Kull or Eddie Kull (December 10, 1885 – December 22, 1946), was an American cinematographer and film director. He worked on more than 100 films between 1916 and 1946. He also directed 43 films between 1919 and 1938. He was born in Illinois.

== Career ==
Edward Kull (sometimes billed as Eddie Kull) worked steadily as a cameraman during the silent-film era. He began with the pioneer William Selig company in 1907, at age 21. In 1915 he joined Universal Pictures, where he served double duty as cameraman and director through 1923. Toward the end of his tenure at Universal he invented a new kind of filter using a prism, to create the futuristic special effect of a telephone receiving a visual image.

Kull took an outside job for hire, filming the drama Barriers of Folly for the independent Russell Productions. This evidently caused Universal to discharge Kull in 1923, and Kull dropped out of pictures until 1927. Kull's treatment at the hands of studio executives appears to have soured him on working with them ever again. From then on he almost always worked outside the studio system as a freelance cameraman for hire. In 1927 Kull became the house cameraman for cowboy star Leo Maloney until Maloney's sudden death in late 1929. Kull then signed on with independent producers John Freuler and Harry S. Webb for their respective feature films, mostly westerns.

Kull's independence allowed him to accept lengthy assignments on remote, rugged locations, like The New Adventures of Tarzan in 1935 (filmed by Edgar Rice Burroughs's production company in the jungles of Guatemala) and Tundra in 1936 (filmed in the snowbound Arctic, again by the Burroughs company). The company of actors and technicians in Guatemala was so small that Kull wound up directing the film as well as photographing it. Kull remained with Burroughs until the independent film company collapsed after only four productions.

When Kull returned to Hollywood he remained an outdoor specialist, again filming westerns for Harry Webb. In 1942 Kull went on location at Kansas City, Missouri to film the Fred Scott western Rodeo Rhythm. It was distributed by PRC, smallest of the Hollywood studios.

In 1943 Kull began working at Monogram Pictures, only slightly larger than PRC, for more westerns. PRC hired Kull in 1944, where he shot westerns almost exclusively for the rest of his career (his single non-western assignment was PRC's 1946 costume adventure The Wife of Monte Cristo). Kull did accept two camera-for-hire jobs, the western Harmony Trail starring Ken Maynard, and the family film A Boy, a Girl, and a Dog with Sharyn Moffett. The latter was Edward Kull's last picture; after a long illness he died in Hollywood, three days before Christmas in 1946.

== Partial filmography ==
- The Mainspring (1916)
- The Social Buccaneer (1916)
- The Measure of a Man (1916)
- Her Soul's Inspiration (1917)
- Polly Redhead (1917)
- A Jewel in Pawn (1917)
- The Lair of the Wolf (1917)
- The Desire of the Moth (1917)
- The Charmer (1917)
- Come Through (1917)
- The Little Orphan (1917)
- The Kaiser, the Beast of Berlin (1918)
- Hungry Eyes (1918)
- Midnight Madness (1918)
- The Face in the Watch (1919) – directed
- The Pointing Finger (1919)
- The Sleeping Lion (1919)
- The Vanishing Dagger (1920) – directed
- The Diamond Queen (1921) – directed
- Terror Trail (1921) – directed
- The Man Trackers (1921) – directed
- Bulldog Courage (1922)
- With Stanley in Africa (1922) – directed
- Barriers of Folly (1922)
- Border Blackbirds (1927)
- The Apache Raider (1928)
- The Bronc Stomper (1928)
- Yellow Contraband (1928)
- Manhattan Knights (1928)
- Making the Varsity (1928)
- The Black Ace (1928)
- The Boss of Rustler's Roost (1928)
- .45 Calibre War (1929)
- King of the Wild (1931)
- Quick Trigger Lee (1931)
- Headin' for Trouble (1931)
- The Cyclone Kid (1931)
- Lariats and Six-Shooters (1931)
- Murder at Dawn (1932)
- The Savage Girl (1932)
- The Gambling Sex (1932)
- The Scarlet Brand (1932)
- 45 Calibre Echo (1932)
- The Forty-Niners (1932)
- Tangled Fortunes (1932)
- Human Targets (1932)
- The Man from New Mexico (1932)
- The Penal Code (1932)
- Mark of the Spur (1932)
- High Gear (1933)
- War of the Range (1933)
- Carnival Lady (1933)
- Marriage on Approval (1933)
- When Lightning Strikes (1934)
- The New Adventures of Tarzan (1935)
- Man's Best Friend (1935) – directed
- The Drag-Net (1936)
- Tundra (1936)
- Law of the Wolf (1939)
- Port of Hate (1939)
- Riders of the Sage (1939)
- Fangs of the Wild (1939)
- Covered Wagon Trails (1940)
- Pioneer Days (1940)
- Wild Horse Valley (1940)
- Guns of the Law (1944)
- Harmony Trail (1944)
- Brand of the Devil (1944)
- Marked for Murder (1945)
- The Wife of Monte Cristo (1946)
- A Boy, a Girl, and a Dog (1946)
