= Burton L. King =

American actor and director

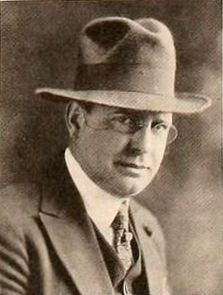
- King in 1920
- Born: August 25, 1877; Cincinnati, Ohio, U.S.
- Died: May 4, 1944 (aged 66); Hollywood, Los Angeles, California, U.S.
- Other name: Burton King
- Occupations: Film director, actor
- Years active: 1912–38

Burton L. King (August 25, 1877 – May 4, 1944) was an American film actor and director. One of his best-known productions was The Lost Battalion (1919).

He was born in Cincinnati. He worked for various film companies including Lubin, Solax, New York Motion Picture Company, Vitagraph, Usona, Universal, and Thanhouser.

== Selected filmography ==
- The Battle of Gettysburg (1913)
- Under the Crescent (1915)
- The Spell of the Yukon (1916)
- The Eternal Question (1916)
- The Black Butterfly (1916)
- The Devil at His Elbow (1916)
- To the Death (1917)
- The Silence Sellers (1917)
- The Soul of a Magdalen (1917)
- The Waiting Soul (1917)
- More Truth Than Poetry (1917)
- Treason (1918)
- The Master Mystery (1919)
- A Scream in the Night (1919)
- The Lost Battalion (1919)
- For Love or Money (1920)
- Why Women Sin (1920)
- Everyman's Price (1921)
- The Man from Beyond (1922)
- The Streets of New York (1922)
- The Fair Cheat (1923)
- The Empty Cradle (1923)
- None So Blind (1923)
- The Man Without a Heart (1924)
- The Truth About Women (1924)
- Playthings of Desire (1924)
- Those Who Judge (1924)
- A Little Girl in a Big City (1925)
- Ermine and Rhinestones (1925)
- The Police Patrol (1925)
- Broadway Madness (1927)
- A Bowery Cinderella (1927)
- Combat (1927)
- The Adorable Cheat (1928)
- Satan and the Woman (1928)
- Manhattan Knights (1928)
- Broken Barriers (1928)
- A Bit of Heaven (1928)
- Women Who Dare (1928)
- Into No Man's Land (1928) (producer)
- Confessions of a Wife (1928) (producer)
- The Dream Melody (1929) (producer)
- Daughters of Desire (1929)
- In Old California (1929)
- The Clean Up (1929) (producer)
- Quick Trigger Lee (1931) (producer)
- The Cyclone Kid (1931) (producer)
- The Penal Code (1932) (producer)
- Human Targets (1932) (producer)
- The Forty-Niners (1932) (producer)
- Mark of the Spur (1932) (producer)
- The Gambling Sex (1932) (producer)
- The Scarlet Brand (1932) (producer)
- Tangled Fortunes (1932) (producer)
- The Man from New Mexico (1932) (producer)
- Murder at Dawn (1932) (production manager)
- War of the Range (1933) (producer)
- When Lightning Strikes (1934)
- $20 a Week (1935) (producer)
- The Drag-Net (1936) (producer)

Silent movie The Master Mystery (1919) directed by Burton L. King for B. A. Rolfe Photoplays. Running time: 09:39. Episode of a serial in 15 episodes with magician and escape artist Houdini in the lead.
