= Conn Pictures Corporation =

American film studio

Conn Pictures Corporation was a film studio in the United States led by producer Maurice Conn from 1934 until 1937 or 1938. Martin G. Conn was an editor and associate producer for the studio.

Conn's films featured Kermit Maynard, Frankie Darro, and Pinky Tomlin.

Jack Greenhalgh was a cinematographer for the studio.

Conn made westerns. The studio also produced the 1936 boxing film Born to Fight. Conn had dealings with the Production Code Administration.

In 1938, the company's trustee sought permission to release its films while it reorganized.

== Filmography ==
- Trails of the Wild (1935)
- Northern Frontier (1935), Ambassador Pictures distributor
- Wilderness Mail (1935), Ambassador Pictures distributor
- Racing Blood (1936)
- Black Gold (1936)
- Born to Fight (1938)
- Wildcat Trooper (1936)
- Galloping Dynamite (1936)
- The Fighting Texan (1937)
- Valley of Terror (1937)
- Anything for a Thrill (1937)
- Sing While You're Able (1937)
- Roaring Six Guns (1937)
- Code of the Rangers (1938)
- Rough Riding Rhythm (1938)
- Where the West Begins (1938)
- Gunsmoke Trail (1938)
- Land of Fighting Men (1938)
