= Ann Lee (actress) =

American businesswoman and actress

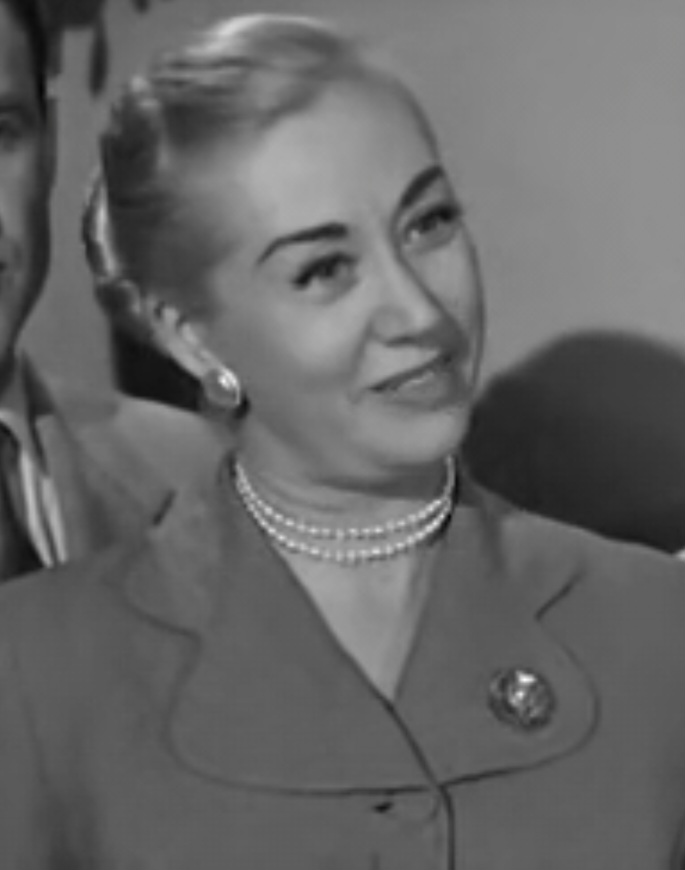
- Ann Lee in an episode of The Public Defender (1955)
- Born: August 8, 1918; Amarillo, Texas, U.S.
- Died: August 19, 2003 (aged 85); Scottsdale, Arizona, U.S.
- Occupation(s): Actress, businesswoman
- Years active: 1948–1962
- Spouse: Jack Harris (m. 1959)

Ann Lee (August 8, 1918 – August 19, 2003) was an American businesswoman and actress.

== Early years ==
Born August 8, 1918, in Amarillo, Texas, Lee was the daughter of James William Lee and DeMetres Thacker Lee. She grew up on the family's ranch north of Amarillo and was educated in Amarillo schools. She attended Amarillo Senior High High School and developed an interest in Little Theatre while she was a student there. She also studied violin and piano in high school and played in the Amarillo Symphony Orchestra.

Lee's father opposed her desire to be an actress. In 1983, she said, "An actress was nearly the worst thing he could think of, and he said he'd rather see me herding sheep, which was definitely the worst thing a cattleman could think of." She attended Amarillo College and graduated from Northwestern University with a bachelor of science degree in speech. While Lee was a Northwestern student, she appeared in four University Theatre productions, one Studio Theatre production, and one community play. She left for New York to seek a career in acting as soon as she completed her final examinations. She honed her acting skills further by attending Max Reinhardt’s School of the Theatre in Hollywood, California.

== Career ==
=== Acting ===
Lee first performed as a professional while she was a student at Northwestern, earning $16.50 per week reading commercials on a radio soap opera. On Broadway, Lee portrayed Miss Stevens and was understudy to Gertrude Lawrence in Lady in the Dark (1941). She also played Alison Du Bois in Lady in the Dark (1943), and Diana Fletcher in O Mistress Mine (1946). Lee made her film debut in Boots Malone (1952). Television shows on which Lee appeared included Public Defender, The Millionaire, Pepsi-Cola Playhouse, and Our Miss Brooks.

=== Business ===
After visiting Texas on a vacation and New Mexico on a holiday, Lee created two stock companies in 1948 and opened two theaters, El Teatro in Santa Fe and the Sombrero Playhouse in Phoenix, in an effort to make the southwestern United States "the birthplace of legitimate drama, which then could be performed in the East". She continued to work as an actress while she managed the theaters. El Teatro's company became a regional troupe, performing five nights each week in its home facility and adding one weekly performance each in Albuquerque and Los Alamos. The Sombrero's reputation became such that "well-known stock players in the East" sought roles in plays there. Actors who performed in one or both of Lee's theaters included William Bendix, Diana Lynn, Guy Madison, Zasu Pitts, Cesar Romero, and Mickey Rooney.

Marriage led to Lee's involvement in the restaurant business. In 1977, her husband, Jack Harris, provided $1 million to build the Harris Ranch Restaurant on Interstate 5, midway between Sacramento and Los Angeles. Lee selected the architect who designed the facility, and she hired the chef away from a restaurant in San Francisco. By 1982, the restaurant was feeding 2,000 people daily and grossing $3.8 million per year. It specialized in serving beef, fruits, and vegetables that had been raised on Harris's 20,000-acre farm. Lee provided daily oversight of the operation, including interaction with customers. Her involvement ended following her husband's death, when she resigned after full control was transferred to his son and the son's wife.

== Personal life and death ==
In 1959, Lee married farmer and rancher Jack Harris. She died on August 19, 2003, in Scottsdale, Arizona.

== Papers ==
Lee's papers are housed in the Northwestern University Archives. The collection includes playbills, photographs, and newspaper clippings from Lee's life.
