= Human Targets =

1932 film

- Directed by: J.P. McGowan
- Written by: George Morgan
- Produced by: Burton L. King
- Starring: Buzz Barton; Francis X. Bushman Jr.
- Cinematography: Edward A. Kull
- Edited by: Fred Bain
- Production company: Big 4 Film Corporation
- Distributed by: Big 4 Film Corporation
- Release date: January 10, 1932
- Running time: 56 minutes
- Country: United States
- Language: English

Human Targets is a 1932 American pre-Code Western film directed by J.P. McGowan and starring Buzz Barton and Francis X. Bushman Jr.

== Plot ==
Buzz Dale's heroic rescue of a runaway stagecoach thwarts criminal Remsden's plan to rob the stage, framing Travis in the process. Remsden tries again, but Dale alerts the sheriff, rescuing Travis from a possible lynching.

== Cast ==
- Buzz Barton as Buzz Dale
- Pauline Parker as Nellie Dale
- Francis X. Bushman Jr. as Bart Travis
- Edmund Cobb as Duke Remsden
- Franklyn Farnum as Sheriff
- Ted Adams as Deputy
- Nanci Price as Marjorie
- John Ince as Doctor
- Fred Toones as 'Snowflake'

== Critical reception ==
Variety gave a positive review, describing the film as "a winner" and "the best entertainment yet directed by J. P. McGowan." The reviewer was impressed by the performance of Buzz Barton, and predicted a future for him in western films as "he has that certain sincerity and wistfulness of expression which makes him 100% likeable."

== Bibliography ==
- Michael R. Pitts. Poverty Row Studios, 1929–1940: An Illustrated History of 55 Independent Film Companies, with a Filmography for Each. McFarland & Company, 2005.
