= Love Past Thirty =

1934 film

- Directed by: Vin Moore
- Written by: Priscilla Wayne (novel); Earle Snell
- Produced by: Walter Futter
- Starring: Aileen Pringle; Theodore von Eltz; Phyllis Barry
- Cinematography: Irvin Akers
- Edited by: Fred Bain
- Production company: Monarch Film Corporation
- Distributed by: Freuler Film Associates
- Release date: February 14, 1934
- Running time: 64 minutes
- Country: United States
- Language: English

Love Past Thirty is a 1934 American pre-Code comedy film directed by Vin Moore and starring Aileen Pringle, Theodore von Eltz and Phyllis Barry.

== Plot ==
After she is ditched by her boyfriend for her younger niece, a woman develops a plan to try and win him back.

== Cast ==
- Aileen Pringle as Caroline Burt
- Theodore von Eltz as Charles Browne
- Phyllis Barry as Beth Ramsden
- John Marston as Walter Ramsden
- Robert Frazer as Don Meredith
- Gertrude Messinger as Zelda Burt
- Steve Pendleton as Sam Adair
- Virginia Sale as Nettle
- Ben Hall as Junior Burt
- Pat O'Malley as Lon Burt
- Dot Farley as Dressmaker
- Mary Carr as Grandma Nelson

== Bibliography ==
- Pitts, Michael R. Poverty Row Studios, 1929-1940. McFarland & Company, 2005.
