= The Clean Up (1929 film) =

1929 film directed by Bernard McEveety

- Directed by: Bernard McEveety
- Written by: Isadore Bernstein; Carmelita Sweeney
- Produced by: Samuel Zierler; Burton L. King
- Starring: Charles Delaney; Betty Blake; Bruce Gordon
- Cinematography: Walter Haas; William Miller
- Edited by: Betty Davis
- Production company: Excellent Pictures
- Distributed by: Excellent Pictures
- Release date: January 20, 1929
- Running time: 60 minutes
- Country: United States
- Languages: Silent; English intertitles

The Clean Up is a 1929 American silent drama film directed by Bernard McEveety and starring Charles Delaney, Betty Blake and Bruce Gordon.

A newspaperman and a cop join forces to clean up a city of its criminal elements.

== Cast ==
- Charles Delaney as Oliver Brooks
- Betty Blake as Susan Clancy
- Bruce Gordon as Hard Boiled Foley
- Lewis Sargent as Hunch
- Harry Myers as Jimmy
- J.P. McGowan as Frank Lawrence
- Charles H. Hickman as Captain Clancy

== Bibliography ==
- Munden, Kenneth White. The American Film Institute Catalog of Motion Pictures Produced in the United States, Part 1. University of California Press, 1997.
