= Fred Bain =

American film editor (1895–1965)

- Born: June 6, 1895; Athens, Georgia, United States
- Died: June 26, 1965 (aged 70); Del Mar, California, United States
- Other name: Frederick Bain
- Occupation: Editor
- Years active: 1923–1950 (film)

Fred Bain (1895–1965) was an American film editor. A prolific worker, he edited over a hundred and seventy films, mainly westerns and action films, and also directed three. He worked at a variety of low-budget studios including Reliable Pictures, Grand National and Monogram Pictures. He was sometimes credited as Frederick Bain.

== Selected filmography ==
- Blood Test (1923)
- Midnight Faces (1926)
- The Ramblin' Galoot (1926)
- Overland Bound (1929)
- Untamed Justice (1929)
- Beyond the Rio Grande (1930)
- Westward Bound (1930)
- Firebrand Jordan (1930)
- The Phantom of the Desert (1930)
- Rogue of the Rio Grande (1930)
- Partners of the Trail (1931)
- Quick Trigger Lee (1931)
- The Kid from Arizona (1931)
- Lariats and Six-Shooters (1931)
- Swanee River (1931)
- So This Is Arizona (1931)
- The Cyclone Kid (1931)
- Headin' for Trouble (1931)
- Mounted Fury (1931)
- Human Targets (1932)
- The Forty-Niners (1932)
- Mark of the Spur (1932)
- The Gambling Sex (1932)
- The Reckoning (1932)
- The Scarlet Brand (1932)
- Devil on Deck (1932)
- The Fighting Gentleman (1932)
- Tangled Fortunes (1932)
- Murder at Dawn (1932)
- The Lone Trail (1932)
- The Savage Girl (1932)
- The Penal Code (1932)
- The Man from New Mexico (1932)
- Kiss of Araby (1933)
- War of the Range (1933)
- Marriage on Approval (1933)
- Her Forgotten Past (1933)
- Secret Sinners (1933)
- Rawhide Mail (1934)
- Love Past Thirty (1934)
- House of Danger (1934)
- Fighting Hero (1934)
- When Lightning Strikes (1934)
- The Fighting Rookie (1934)
- Ridin' Thru (1934)
- Badge of Honor (1934)
- Mystery Ranch (1934)
- Terror of the Plains (1934)
- Circus Shadows (1935)
- The Silver Bullet (1935)
- The Laramie Kid (1935)
- Now or Never (1935)
- $20 a Week (1935)
- Unconquered Bandit (1935)
- The Cactus Kid (1935)
- Calling All Cars (1935)
- Tracy Rides (1935)
- Skull and Crown (1935)
- Texas Jack (1935)
- Silent Valley (1935)
- On Probation (1935)
- Wolf Riders (1935)
- Step on It (1936)
- Pinto Rustlers (1936)
- Fast Bullets (1936)
- Senor Jim (1936)
- Ridin' On (1936)
- Night Cargo (1936)
- Desert Guns (1936)
- Headin' for the Rio Grande (1936)
- Santa Fe Rides (1937)
- Trouble in Texas (1937)
- Riders of the Dawn (1937)
- Blake of Scotland Yard (1937)
- Riders of the Rockies (1937)
- Smashing the Vice Trust (1937)
- Arizona Days (1937)
- Sing, Cowboy, Sing (1937)
- It's All in Your Mind (1938)
- Song of the Buckaroo (1938)
- Starlight Over Texas (1938)
- Frontier Town (1938)
- The Utah Trail (1938)
- Riders of the Frontier (1939)
- Westbound Stage (1939)
- The Pal from Texas (1939)
- Rollin' Westward (1939)
- Man from Texas (1939)
- Straight Shooter (1939)
- Smoky Trails (1939)
- Pinto Canyon (1940)
- Rainbow Over the Range (1940)
- Arizona Frontier (1940)
- Rollin' Home to Texas (1940)
- Roll Wagons Roll (1940)
- Gentleman from Dixie (1941)
- The Pioneers (1941)
- Dynamite Canyon (1941)
- Lone Star Law Men (1941)
- Riot Squad (1941)
- Silver Stallion (1941)
- The Driftin' Kid (1941)
- Wanderers of the West (1941)
- Riding the Sunset Trail (1941)
- King of the Stallions (1942)
- The Panther's Claw (1942)
- Foreign Agent (1942)
- Gallant Lady (1942)
- Where Trails End (1942)
- Arizona Roundup (1942)
- The Yanks Are Coming (1942)
- Wild Horse Stampede (1943)
- Harmony Trail (1944)
- Rogues' Gallery (1944)
- Timber Fury (1950)

== Bibliography ==
- Michael R. Pitts. Poverty Row Studios, 1929–1940: An Illustrated History of 55 Independent Film Companies, with a Filmography for Each. McFarland & Company, 2005.
