= $20 a Week =

1935 American melodrama film

- Directed by: Wesley Ford
- Written by: L. V. Jefferson
- Produced by: Burton L. King
- Starring: Pauline Starke; James Murray; Gwen Lee
- Cinematography: Arthur Martinelli
- Edited by: Fred Bain
- Production company: Alexander Brothers
- Distributed by: State Rights; Ajax Pictures
- Release date: February 2, 1935 (US)
- Running time: 80 minutes
- Country: United States
- Language: English

$20 a Week is a 1935 American melodrama film directed by Wesley Ford and starring James Murray, Pauline Starke, and Gwen Lee. It was released on February 2, 1935.

== Plot ==
Sally Blair, a feisty young stenographer is in the employ of a Mr. Warner, an insurance agent who fancies his chances. She accepts a date even though she had made plans with the new salesman, Peter Douglas. Warner takes Sally to a nightclub and, in a private room, tries to kiss her. She retaliates by punching him. Warner, for reasons unknown, promotes Sally to his personal secretary. Later, at a wedding, Peter proposes to Sally. The next day, Peter's mother, who believes Sally is after his money, warns her to keep away from Peter. Naturally, they end up getting married.

== Cast ==
- Pauline Starke as Sally Blair
- James Murray as Peter Douglas
- Gwen Lee as Ann Seymour
- Dorothy Revier as Linda Davidson
- William Worthington as Mr. Davidson
- Andy Rice Jr. as Mac Tierney
- Bartlett Carré as Jimmy Dale
- Glorian Grey as Mamie
- Bryant Washburn as Warner
- Vessie Farrell as Mrs. Douglas

== Production ==
In November 1934, Rob Eden's story, $20 a Week was purchased by the independent producer Burton L. King, with the intent of making the film independently and distributing it through Ajax Distributing Corporation. The film was to be the first in a series of four pictures. By the end of the month King had formed his production house, Four-Leaf Clover Productions, and had signed Pauline Starke to star in the film. In December the name of the production company had become Ajax Pictures, and $20 a Week was the first of 10 films planned by the company. By the end of December 1934 the filming on the picture had been completed. In January 1935 it was revealed that John Murray was also starring in the film.

== Reception ==
The Film Daily gave the film a mostly negative review, calling Wesley Ford's direction "unnatural", and Al Martin's cinematography only fair. However, they did enjoy Starke's performance, saying that at times it rose "to excellent work", despite the mediocrity of the film.
