= Alice Dahl =

American film and stage actress (1913–1977

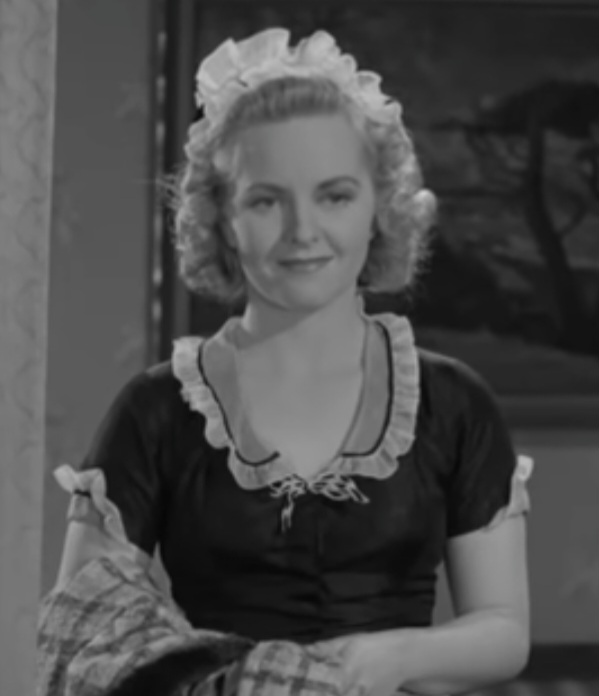
- Dahl in Invisible Ghost (1941)
- Born: Theresa Norberg; January 7, 1914; Petersburg, Alaska, U.S.
- Died: May 8, 1977 (aged 63); Chula Vista, California, U.S.
- Other name: Terry Walker
- Occupation: Actress
- Years active: 1933–1944
- Spouse: Jan Rubini (m. 1940; div. 1960)
- Children: 2, including Michel Rubini

Theresa "Terry" Norberg (January 7, 1913 – May 8, 1977), later known as Alice Dahl, was an American film and stage actress. She had roles, including as the female lead, in Western B movies. She later went by the stage name Terry Walker.

== Early life ==
Theresa Norberg was born in Petersburg, Alaska on January 7, 1913. Her father, Charles Norberg, ran a fur farm near Petersburg. Her mother was Emelia Dahl and her sister was named Lillian Norberg. At age 11, she attended school in Seattle. Soon after, her adopted family moved to Hollywood.

== Career ==
Before 1933, Dahl was a part of the Little Theater Movement in southern California and she acted in minor parts in films. Her first leading role was in the film Whirlwind, which was produced under the working title Free Ranger. The film was a Western, and Dahl played opposite Tim McCoy.

Dahl had a small part in the 1934 Laurel and Hardy musical film Babes in Toyland and in one of Shemp Howard's films.

Dahl acted in Hollywood films for around ten years, mainly in minor roles, before leaving to work in radio. Around this time, she began to go professionally by the name Terry Walker. After being offered a job to sing with Jan Rubini's orchestra, she performed in Phoenix, Arizona for two seasons. She sang in New York with Jack Denny's band, and performed again with Rubini in Miami, Florida. After a Paramount employee saw her photo on a magazine cover, she returned to Hollywood and was signed to the studio on a "stock contract" around 1936.

== Personal life and death ==
Dahl met violinist Jan Rubini during the 1930s, and was accused of "stealing" him by Rubini's second wife, Adele. Dahl and Rubini married in 1940. The couple had two children, Michel and David, before divorcing in the early 1960s. Dahl died in Chula Vista, California on May 8, 1977, at the age of 64.

== Filmography ==
- The Whirlwind (1933), as Mollie
- When Lightning Strikes (1934), as Helen Stevens, co-starring role
- Babes in Toyland (1934)
- Twisted Rails (1934), as Mary McGuire
- Coyote Trails (1935), as Helen Baker

=== As Terry Walker ===
- And Sudden Death (1936)
- 23 1/2 Hours Leave (1937), as Peggy Markley
- Mountain Music (film) (1937), as Lobelia Sheppard
- Blonde Trouble (1937), as Eileen Fletcher
- Federal Bullets (1937), as Milly
- On the Great White Trail (1938), as Kay Larkin
- Delinquent Parents (1938)
- Billy the Kid in Texas (1940), as Mary Barton
- Take Me Back to Oklahoma (1940), as Jane Winters
- Dangerous Lady (film) (1941), as Annie Lowell
- The Medico of Painted Springs (1941)
- Invisible Ghost (1941), as Cecile Mannix
- Voodoo Man (1944), as Alice
