= J. P. McGowan =

Australian film director (1880–1952)

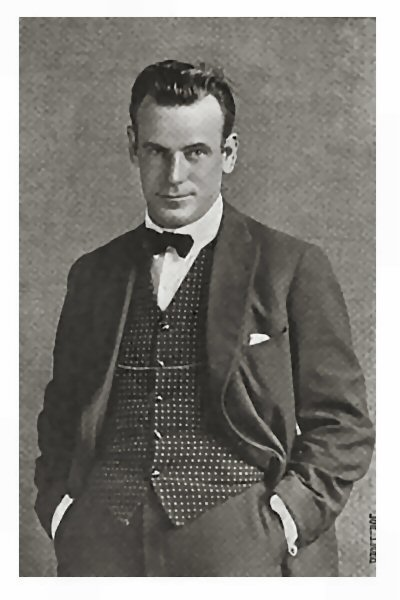
- Who's Who in the Film World, 1914
- Born: John Paterson McGowan; February 24, 1880; Terowie, South Australia, Australia
- Died: March 26, 1952 (aged 72); Hollywood, California, United States
- Occupations: Actor; Director; Writer
- Years active: 1910–1938

John Paterson McGowan (February 24, 1880 – March 26, 1952) was a pioneering Hollywood actor and director and occasionally a screenwriter and producer. McGowan remains the only Australian to have been made a life member of the Screen Directors Guild (now Directors Guild of America).

== Biography ==
Born in the then-bustling railway centre of Terowie in South Australia, McGowan grew up in Adelaide (Islington) and Sydney (Eveleigh, now Redfern, and Newtown). He was a capable horseman and served in the Second Boer War with Montmorency's Scouts as a special dispatch rider.

From South Africa McGowan was recruited to take part in a Boer War exhibit in the US at the 1904 World's Fair. He then began working in live theatre, and in 1910 joined Kalem Studios in New York City. That year McGowan made his first film appearance in A Lad from Old Ireland as part of the crew that traveled to Ireland to do the first American film shot on location outside of the United States. His horseback riding ability enabled him to do many of Kalem's riding stunts.

McGowan directed and often acted in the first 33 episodes of Kalem's 1914 adventure film series, The Hazards of Helen, which eventually ran to 54 episodes, some still with McGowan's participation. With other contributors, the series ran on to 119 episodes in all. While filming he began a relationship with Helen Holmes, the film's star, and the two married. They left Kalem to set up their own production company, Signal Films, which successfully made mainly railroad melodrama serials and features but lost out when their distributor (Mutual) failed. The collaboration ended when they divorced in 1925. There was an adopted daughter, Kaye.

McGowan successfully made the transition from silent film to talkies. While never a major star, in a busy career that spanned four decades he is credited with acting in 232 films—mostly strong roles like sheriff or villain—writing 26 screenplays and directing 242 productions. In 1932 he directed a young John Wayne in the 12-episode rail vs airplane serial The Hurricane Express for the independent Mascot Pictures. McGowan had a strong role in the Gene Autry picture Guns and Guitars but only the sidekick actors were noted on the poster

From 1938 to 1951, as Executive Secretary of the Screen Directors Guild, he fought to secure recognition for the director within the studio systems of the film and emerging television industry.

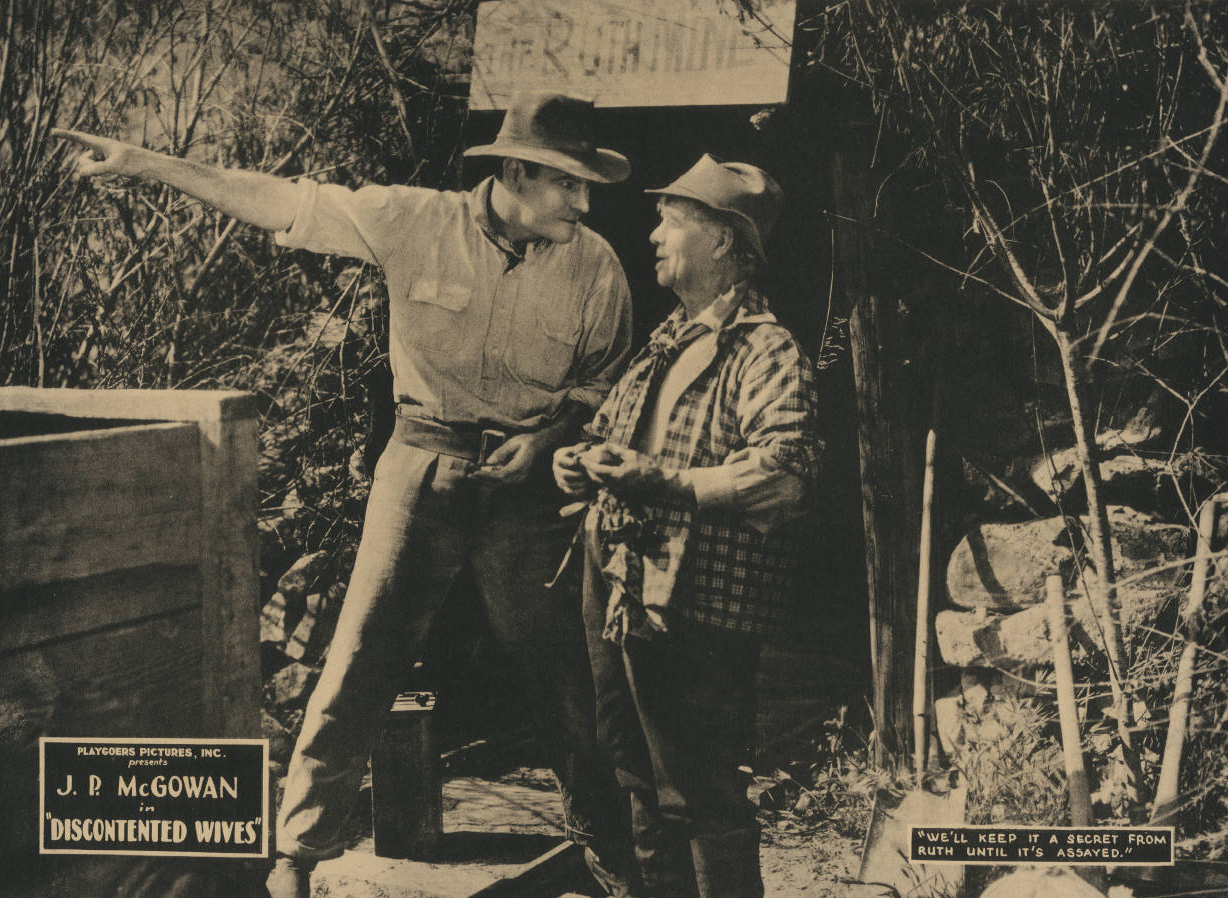
Lobby card for Discontented Wives (1921)

McGowan died in 1952 in Hollywood and was interred in the Forest Lawn Memorial Park Cemetery in Glendale, California.

McGowan's career was commemorated in the town of his birth by Terowie Days of Rail and Screen events from 2002–2010. His partnership with Helen Holmes is honored in the bio-tribute Stunt Love, which was presented at the Adelaide Film Festival in February 2011 and at the Museum of Modern Art in April 2011.

== Selected filmography ==
=== Director ===
- Tragedy of the Desert (1912)
- The Hazards of Helen (1914–1915)
- The Voice in the Fog (1915)
- Blackbirds (1915)
- Elmo the Mighty (1919)
- Elmo the Fearless (1920)
- Do or Die (1921)
- Tiger True (1921)
- Below the Deadline (1921)
- Hills of Missing Men (1922)
- Perils of the Yukon (1922)
- Stormy Seas (1923)
- One Million in Jewels (1923)
- Red Blood (1925)
- Blood and Steel (1925)
- Mistaken Orders (1925)
- Barriers of the Law (1925)
- Riding Romance (1925)
- Duped (1925)
- Fighting Luck (1925)
- The Fear Fighter (1925)
- The Texas Terror (1925)
- The Lure of the Track (1925)
- Crack o' Dawn (1925)
- Outwitted (1925)
- Señor Daredevil (1926)
- Crossed Signals (1926)
- The Road Agent (1926)
- Unseen Enemies (1926)
- The Brown Derby (1926)
- Danger Quest (1926)
- The Lost Trail (1926)
- Arizona Nights (1927)
- The Lost Limited (1927)
- Thunderbolt's Tracks (1927)
- Tarzan and the Golden Lion (1927)
- The Red Raiders (1927)
- The Slaver (1927)
- Aflame in the Sky (1927)
- The Chinatown Mystery (1928, serial)
- Trailin' Back (1928)
- Arizona Days (1928)
- Trail Riders (1928)
- On the Divide (1928)
- West of Santa Fe (1928)
- Manhattan Cowboy (1928)
- Lightnin' Shot (1928)
- The Devil's Tower (1928)
- Two Outlaws (1928)
- Mystery Valley (1928)
- Devil Dogs (1928)
- Silent Trail (1928)
- Texas Tommy (1928)
- Law of the Mounted (1928)
- The Painted Trail (1928)
- The Black Ace (1928)
- An Oklahoma Cowboy (1929)
- Bad Men's Money (1929)
- Wyoming Tornado (1929)
- The Cowboy and the Outlaw (1929)
- Riders of the Storm (1929)
- Captain Cowboy (1929)
- The Oklahoma Kid (1929)
- Headin' Westward (1929)
- The Clean Up (1929)
- The Man from Nevada (1929)
- Below the Deadline (1929)
- Beyond the Law (1930)
- Breezy Bill (1930)
- Call of the Desert (1930)
- The Canyon of Missing Men (1930)
- Code of Honor (1930)
- Quick Trigger Lee (1931)
- Riders of the North (1931)
- Headin' for Trouble (1931)
- So This Is Arizona (1931)
- The Cyclone Kid (1931)
- A Son of the Plains (1931)
- The Man from New Mexico (1932)
- The Scarlet Brand (1932)
- Tangled Fortunes (1932)
- Mark of the Spur (1932)
- Lawless Valley (1932)
- The Hurricane Express (1932)
- Human Targets (1932)
- Deadwood Pass (1933)
- War of the Range (1933)
- When a Man Rides Alone (1933)
- No More Women (1934)
- The Outlaw Tamer (1935)
- Stampede (1936)
- Heart of the Rockies (1937)
- Silent Sinclair (1937)

=== Actor ===
- Whispering Smith (1908) – George McCloud
- From the Manger to the Cross (1912) – Wise Man 1
- The Hazards of Helen (1914, Serial) – Train Controller / Benton / Rand – Yeggman / Dan Haddon – Cowboy / Brandt – Cashier / Blake – Lineman / Rand – Fireman / Lockwood – Flagman / Warren – Railman / Thomas – Wiretapper Chief / Trow – Wrecking Crewman
- Cold Steel (1921)
- Hills of Missing Men (1922)
- One Million in Jewels (1923)
- The Patent Leather Pug (1925)
- Red Blood (1925)
- Fighting Luck (1925)
- Barriers of the Law (1925)
- Riding Romance (1925)
- Makers of Men (1925)
- Moran of the Mounted (1926)
- The Royal American (1927)
- The Devil's Tower (1928)
- The Code of the Scarlet (1928)
- Dugan of the Dugouts (1928)
- An Oklahoma Cowboy (1929)
- Señor Americano (1929)
- The Cowboy and the Outlaw (1929)
- Bad Men's Money (1929)
- Wyoming Tornado (1929)
- The Oklahoma Kid (1929)
- Headin' Westward (1929)
- Breezy Bill (1930)
- When Lightning Strikes (1934)
- The Outlaw Tamer (1935)
- Fury and the Woman (1936)
