= The Apache Kid's Escape =

1930 film

- Original film poster
- Directed by: Robert J. Horner
- Written by: Robert J. Horner
- Produced by: Robert J. Horner
- Starring: Jack Perrin; Josephine Hill
- Cinematography: Bert Baldridge
- Edited by: William Austin
- Music by: Baby, Oh Where Can You Be written by Frank Magnine; Ted Kohler
- Production company: Cosmos Productions
- Release date: November 22, 1930
- Running time: 51 minutes
- Country: United States
- Language: English

The Apache Kid's Escape is a 1930 American Western film written, produced and directed by Robert J. Horner and starring Jack Perrin and his wife Josephine Hill. It was a remake of The White Outlaw (1929). The film was shot in Valencia, California. Jack Perrin's five-picture deal with Horner ended up in court when Perrin only received $1,425 out of the $2,900 that was agreed upon.

== Plot ==
Hurt by his sister's letter saying they can not accept the money he sent for his sick mother as it was obtained illegally, the Apache Kid decides to go on the straight and narrow. Others including Buck Harris and Ted Conway decide to use the Apache Kid's trademark of a chequered scarf to commit robberies.

== Cast ==
- Jack Perrin as Jim AKA The Apache Kid
- Fred Church as Ted Conway
- Josephine Hill as Jane Wilson
- Virginia Ashcroft as Sally Wilson
- Bud Osborne as Buck Harris
- Fred Burns as Bill Lang
- Henry Roquemore as Frank Conway
- Charles Le Moyne as Another Sheriff
- Buzz Barton as Tim Wells
- Horace B. Carpenter as Larry Wilson
- Starlight the Horse as himself

== Bibliography ==
- John Brooker The Happiest Trails Lulu.com; First Edition (April 7, 2017)
