= Silent Sentinel (film) =

1929 film

- Directed by: Alan James
- Written by: Alan James
- Produced by: Hans Tiesler
- Starring: Gareth Hughes; Josephine Hill
- Cinematography: M.A. Anderson
- Edited by: Alan James
- Production company: Chesterfield Pictures
- Distributed by: Chesterfield Pictures
- Release date: May 15, 1929
- Running time: 51 minutes
- Country: United States
- Languages: Silent; English intertitles

Silent Sentinel is a 1929 American silent crime film directed by Alan James and starring Gareth Hughes and Josephine Hill.

== Cast ==
- Champion the Dog as Champion
- Gareth Hughes as Bob Benton
- Josephine Hill as Grace Carlton
- Walter Maly as Tom
- Lew Meehan as Detective
- Aline Goodwin as Maizie
- Alfred Hewston as Warren Gordon
- Eddie Brownell as Joe Carlton
- Alice Covert as Mrs. Carlton
- John Tansey as Convict
- Edward Cecil as Chick
- Jack Knight as Dick
- George Morrell as Insurance man

== Bibliography ==
- Michael R. Pitts. Poverty Row Studios, 1929-1940: An Illustrated History of 55 Independent Film Companies, with a Filmography for Each. McFarland & Company, 2005.(Online entry)
