= West of Cheyenne =

West of Cheyenne may refer to:

- West of Cheyenne (1931 film), an American western film directed by Harry S. Webb
- West of Cheyenne (1938 film), an American western film directed by Sam Nelson
