= The Fighting Heart =

The Fighting Heart may refer to:

- The Fighting Heart (1919 film), directed by B. Reeves Eason
- The Fighting Heart (1925 film), directed by John Ford
