= Border Vengeance =

Border Vengeance may refer to:

- Border Vengeance (1935 film), an American Western B movie
- Border Vengeance (1925 film), an American silent Western film
