= Daring Danger =

Daring Danger may refer to:

- Daring Danger (1922 film)
- Daring Danger (1932 film)
