= The Open Switch =

1925 film

- Directed by: J.P. McGowan
- Produced by: Morris R. Schlank
- Starring: Helen Holmes; Jack Perrin; Slim Whitaker
- Production company: Morris R. Schlank Productions
- Distributed by: Rayart Pictures
- Release date: July 1925
- Running time: 50 minutes
- Country: United States
- Languages: Silent; English intertitles

The Open Switch is a 1925 American silent film directed by J. P. McGowan and starring Helen Holmes, Jack Perrin, and Slim Whitaker.

== Cast ==
- Helen Holmes as Helen Waters
- Jack Perrin as Jack Strong
- Slim Whitaker as Jim McGuire
- Max Asher as Tim Gerraghty
- Mack V. Wright as Daniel Lonergan
- Henry Roquemore as George Waters
- Arthur Millett
- J. Carrol Naish

== Bibliography ==
- Munden, Kenneth White. The American Film Institute Catalog of Motion Pictures Produced in the United States, Part 1. University of California Press, 1997.
