= Ethel Davey =

English film editor

- Born: Ethel Davey; 21 October 1885; England
- Died: 10 May 1972 (aged 86); Los Angeles, California
- Other names: Grace Davey
- Occupation: Film editor
- Spouse: Robert Atkins

Ethel Davey (sometimes credited as Grace Davey) was an English film editor active primarily in the 1920s and 1930s. She was married to English actor Robert Atkins.

== Selected filmography ==
- Clipped Wings (1937)
- Contra la Corriente (1935)
- Get That Man (1935)
- Guilty Parents (1934)
- Jaws of Justice (1933)
- The Wyoming Whirlwind (1932)
- The Racing Strain (1932)
- The Face on the Barroom Floor (1932)
- Outlaw Justice (1932)
- Sinister Hands (1932)
- The Cheyenne Cyclone (1931)
- The Phantom (1931)
- The Hurricane Horseman (1931)
- Hell's Valley (1931)
- Red Fork Range (1931)
- Breed of the West (1930)
- Trails of Danger (1930)
- The Carnation Kid (1929)
