= Thunderbolt's Tracks =

1927 film directed by J.P. McGowan

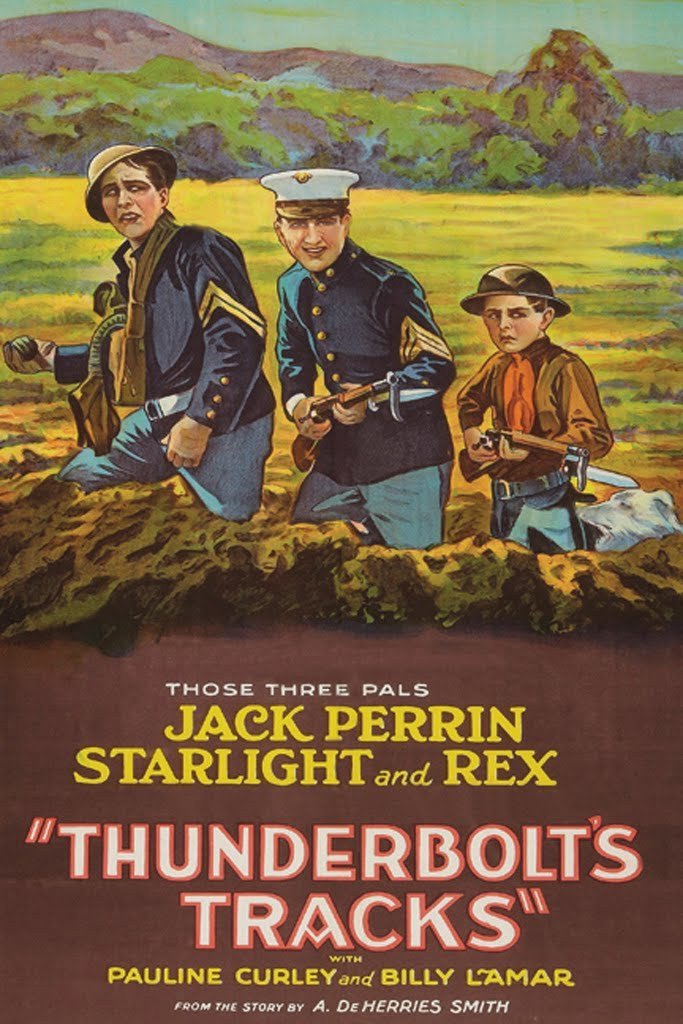
- Directed by: J.P. McGowan
- Written by: A. DeHerries Smith; Bennett Cohen
- Produced by: Harry S. Webb; W. Ray Johnston
- Starring: Jack Perrin; Pauline Curley; Buzz Barton
- Cinematography: William Hyer
- Production company: Ben Wilson Productions
- Distributed by: Rayart Pictures
- Release date: January 1927
- Running time: 50 minutes
- Country: United States
- Languages: Silent; English intertitles

Thunderbolt's Tracks is a 1927 American silent Western film directed by J.P. McGowan and starring Jack Perrin, Pauline Curley and Buzz Barton.

== Cast ==
- Jack Perrin as Sergeant Larry Donovan
- Pauline Curley as Alice Hayden
- Buzz Barton as Red Hayden
- Jack Henderson as Pop Hayden
- Harry Tenbrook as Corporal Biff Flannagan
- Ethan Laidlaw as Buck Moulton
- Ruth Royce as Speedy
- Alfred Hewston as Timekeeper
- Cliff Lyons as Cafe Customer
- Lew Meehan as Marshal
- Starlight the Horse as Starlight - Larry's new Horse
- Rex the Dog as Red's Dog

== Bibliography ==
- John J. McGowan. J.P. McGowan: Biography of a Hollywood Pioneer. McFarland, 2005.
