= The Call of the Wilderness =

1926 film

- Directed by: Jack Nelson
- Written by: Earl Johnson; Lon Young
- Produced by: Joe Rock
- Starring: Edna Marion; Sidney De Gray; Albert J. Smith
- Production company: Chesterfield Pictures
- Distributed by: Associated Exhibitors
- Release date: December 5, 1926
- Running time: 56 minutes
- Country: United States
- Languages: Silent; English intertitles

The Call of the Wilderness is a 1926 American silent Western drama film directed by Jack Nelson and starring Edna Marion, Sidney De Gray and Albert J. Smith. Location shooting took place around Newhall in California. A young man meets a girl in a small western town. He likes her and buys from her father, a land agent, a piece of land to try and please her. Hanging on to his new land is made very difficult for him.

== Cast ==
- Lewis Sargent as Andrew Horton Jr
- Edna Marion as Dorothy Deveau – Land Agent's Daughter
- Sidney De Gray as Andrew Horton Sr.
- Albert J. Smith as Red Morgan
- Max Asher as Joe
- Tom Connelly as Tom, the Banker's Son
- George Y. Harvey as Jean Deveau – Land Agent
- Sandow the Dog as Sandow

== Preservation ==
With no holdings located in archives, The Call of the Wilderness is considered a lost film.
