= The House of Gold =

1918 silent film directed by Edwin Carewe

- Directed by: Edwin Carewe
- Screenplay by: June Mathis
- Story by: Katharine Kavanaugh
- Produced by: Maxwell Karger
- Starring: Emmy Wehlen; Joseph Kilgour; Hugh Thompson
- Cinematography: Eugene Gaudio
- Production company: Metro Pictures
- Release date: June 17, 1918 (US)
- Running time: 5 reels
- Country: United States
- Language: English

The House of Gold is a 1918 American silent drama film, directed by Edwin Carewe. It stars Emmy Wehlen, Joseph Kilgour, and Hugh Thompson, and was released on June 17, 1918.

== Cast ==
- Emmy Wehlen as Pamela Martin
- Joseph Kilgour as Douglas Martin/Gilbert Martin
- Hugh Thompson as Frank Steele
- Helen Lindroth as Mrs. Stanley Cartwright
- Maud Hill as Mrs. Alicia Temple

== Censorship ==
Before The House of Gold could be exhibited in Kansas, the Kansas Board of Review required the elimination of a closeup of a dancing girl, and of men lifting dancing girls off of table and holding them.

== Preservation ==
With no prints of The House of Gold located in any film archives, it is considered a lost film.
