= The Red Man and the Child =

1908 film directed by D. W. Griffith

- Directed by: D. W. Griffith
- Written by: D. W. Griffith (screenplay); Bret Harte (novel)
- Produced by: American Mutoscope & Biograph Company
- Starring: Charles Inslee
- Cinematography: G. W. Bitzer; Arthur Marvin
- Distributed by: American Mutoscope & Biograph
- Release date: July 28, 1908
- Running time: 14 minutes
- Country: United States
- Languages: Silent; English intertitles

The Red Man and the Child is a 1908 American black-and-white short silent Western film directed by D. W. Griffith for the American Mutoscope & Biograph Company. It stars Charles Inslee and six-year old John Tansey.

== Cast ==
- Charles Inslee as The Sioux
- John Tansey as Child (as Johnny Tansey)
- Linda Arvidson as Woman
- George Gebhardt as Villain
- Harry Solter as Villain

== See also ==
- D. W. Griffith filmography
- List of American films of 1908
