= Songs and Saddles =

1938 film

- Theatrical release poster
- Directed by: Harry L. Fraser
- Written by: Arthur A. Brooks (story); Harry L. Fraser (screenplay)
- Produced by: Arthur Alexander (producer); Max Alexander (producer); Alfred Stern (associate producer)
- Starring: Gene Austin; Henry Roquemore; Charles King
- Cinematography: Robert E. Cline; Harry Forbes
- Edited by: Charles Henkel Jr.
- Production company: Colony Pictures
- Distributed by: Grand National Pictures
- Release date: June 1, 1938
- Running time: 59 minutes
- Country: United States
- Language: English

Songs and Saddles is a 1938 American Western film directed by Harry L. Fraser and starring Gene Austin, Henry Roquemore and Charles King.

== Cast ==
- Gene Austin as Gene Austin
- Lynne Berkeley as Carol Turner
- Henry Roquemore as Lawyer Jed Hill
- Walter Wills as Pop Turner
- Ted Claire as Mark Bower
- Joan Brooks as Lucy
- Karl Hackett as Banker George Morrow
- Charles King as Road boss Falcon
- John Merton as Henchman Rocky Renaut
- Candy Hall as Musician Slim
- Coco Heimel as Musician Porky
- John Elliott as Sheriff John Lawton
- Ben Corbett as Henchman Sparks
- Bob Terry as Henchman Klinker
- Lloyd Ingraham as Judge Harrison

== Soundtrack ==
- Gene Austin with Candy Hall and Coco Heimel - "Song of the Saddle" (Written by Gene Austin)
- Gene Austin - "I'm Comin' Home" (Written by Gene Austin)
- Gene Austin with Candy Hall and Coco Heimel - "I Fell Down and Broke My Heart" (Written by Gene Austin)
- Gene Austin - "Why Can't I Be Your Sweetheart Tonight?" (Written by Gene Austin)
- Gene Austin - "The Man From Texas" (Written by Gene Austin)
