= Scareheads =

1931 American crime film

- Directed by: Noel M. Smith
- Written by: Richard Talmadge
- Produced by: Richard Talmadge
- Starring: Richard Talmadge; Gareth Hughes; Julie Bishop
- Production company: Richard Talmadge Productions
- Distributed by: Capitol Film Exchange
- Release date: October 25, 1931
- Running time: 67 minutes
- Country: United States
- Language: English

Scareheads is a 1931 American crime film directed by Noel M. Smith and starring Richard Talmadge, Gareth Hughes, Julie Bishop.

== Cast ==
- Richard Talmadge as Dick Tanner
- Gareth Hughes
- Julie Bishop
- Joseph W. Girard
- Virginia True Boardman
- King Baggot
- Lloyd Whitlock
- Walter James
- Edward Lynch
- Nancy Caswell

== Bibliography ==
- Michael R. Pitts. Poverty Row Studios, 1929–1940: An Illustrated History of 55 Independent Film Companies, with a Filmography for Each. McFarland & Company, 2005.
