= Romance of the West (1930 film) =

1930 film

- Directed by: John Tansey; Robert Emmett Tansey
- Written by: John Tansey; Robert Emmett Tansey
- Produced by: Arthur Hammond
- Starring: Jack Perrin; Edna Marion; Tom London
- Cinematography: Glen Gano
- Edited by: Robert Emmett Tansey
- Production company: Arthur Hammond Productions
- Distributed by: Capitol Film Exchange
- Release date: June 15, 1930
- Running time: 55 minutes
- Country: United States
- Language: English

Romance of the West is a 1930 American pre-Code western film written and directed by John Tansey and Robert Emmett Tansey and starring Jack Perrin, Edna Marion and Tom London.

== Cast ==
- Jack Perrin as Jack Walsh
- Edna Marion as Mary Winters
- Tom London as 'Kayo' Mooney
- Henry Roquemore as 'Slick' Graham
- Ben Corbett as Buck
- Fern Emmett as Landlady
- Dick Hatton as Parson
- Edwin August as Chuck Anderson
- James Sheridan as Molester
- Starlight the Horse as Starlight - Jack's Horse

== Bibliography ==
- Pitts, Michael R. Western Movies: A Guide to 5,105 Feature Films. McFarland, 2012.
