= Robert Atkins (actor) =

English actor (1886–1972)

Robert Atkins CBE
- "Old Vic" Shakespeare Co. photo
- Born: Robert Alexander Atkins Jr. 10 August 1886; Dulwich, London, England, UK
- Died: 9 February 1972 (aged 85); London, England, UK
- Occupations: Actor, producer, director
- Spouse(s): Mary Sumner; Ethel Davey

Robert Alexander Atkins Jr. CBE (10 August 1886 – 9 February 1972) was an English actor, producer and director.

== Biography ==
Robert Alexander Atkins Jr. was born in Dulwich, London, England, to Annie Evans and Robert Atkins Sr. He had a brother, Lawrence. Atkins was most famous for his association with the theatre. An early graduate of Beerbohm Tree's Academy of Dramatic Art, he joined the Old Vic company in 1915, and became Director of Productions for Lilian Baylis from 1921 to 1926. He also appeared many times on film and in television, although not with the success of his theatre career.

His first film was a 1913 production of Hamlet, as the First Player, with Johnston Forbes-Robertson in the title role. Atkins went on to appear in several other film and television roles over the next 50 years with the most famous production possibly being A Matter of Life and Death. He also produced and/or directed several adaptations of William Shakespeare plays during the 1940s and 1950s for British TV. He was director of the Shakespeare Memorial Theatre in Stratford, and along with Sydney Carroll, also founded Regent's Park Open Air Theatre.

== Personal life and death ==
Robert Atkins was married twice: to Mary Sumner whom he divorced, and to Ethel Davey, a film editor. He died in London, England in 1972.

== Filmography ==
Year	Title	Role	Notes
1935	Peg of Old Drury	Dr. Samuel Johnson	
1936	The Cardinal	General Belmont	
1936	Everything Is Thunder	Adjutant	
1937	Victoria the Great	Garter King-at-Arms	
1941	He Found a Star	Frank Forrester	
1942	Let the People Sing	Hassock	
1942	The Great Mr. Handel		
1946	A Matter of Life and Death	The Vicar	
1949	That Dangerous Age	George Drummond	
1949	Black Magic	King Louis XV	
1951	I'll Never Forget You	Dr. Samuel Johnson	Uncredited
