= The Desert's Price =

1925 film

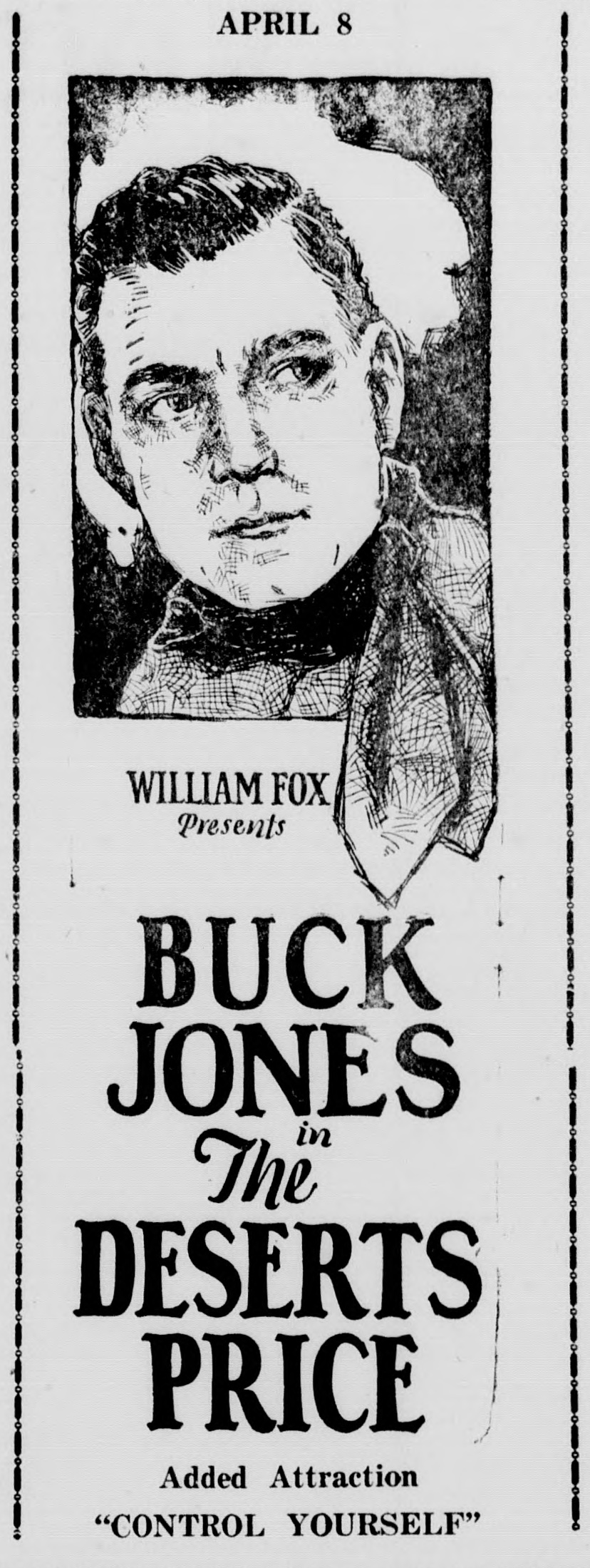
- Newspaper advertisement
- Directed by: W. S. Van Dyke
- Screenplay by: Charles Darnton
- Based on: The Desert's Price by William MacLeod Raine
- Starring: Buck Jones; Florence Gilbert; Edna Marion; Ernest Butterworth; Arthur Housman; Montagu Love
- Cinematography: Reginald Lyons
- Production company: Fox Film Corporation
- Distributed by: Fox Film Corporation
- Release date: December 13, 1925
- Running time: 60 minutes
- Country: United States
- Languages: Silent; English intertitles

The Desert's Price is a lost 1925 American silent Western film directed by W. S. Van Dyke and written by Charles Darnton. It is based on the 1924 novel The Desert's Price by William MacLeod Raine. The film stars Buck Jones, Florence Gilbert, Edna Marion, Ernest Butterworth, Arthur Housman and Montagu Love. The film was released on December 13, 1925, by Fox Film Corporation.

== Plot ==
As described in a review in a film magazine, while Wils McCann is away, Julia Starke's father is shot and many of their sheep killed. Knowing of the land war between shepherds and ranchers, she blames the McCann outfit. Not knowing that Wils is McCann, Julia accepts his help when an unruly ram chases her. Wils, learning of her suspicions, discovers that a shady bunch, the Martin Brothers, are the real culprits. The Martin Brothers attempt to win over the Starke sisters but are refused. Sam Martin attempts to kiss Nora and she falls and is badly hurt. Julia goes after Sam and shoots at him, and her brother Phil later has a fight with Sam who is shot. On a tip from Jim Martin, the sheriff comes to arrest Julia and makes Wils his deputy. He offers her a chance to escape but she insists on giving herself up. Sam incites the mob to attack the sheriff's home. Wils inveigles him there while Julia rides for Wils' men, who arrive in time to disperse the mob. Sam's henchman accuses him of killing Julia's father and her sheep. Sam tries to escape but is subdued by Wils. Phil is freed by the jury and Julia acknowledges her love for Wils.

== Cast ==
- Buck Jones as Wils McCann
- Florence Gilbert as Julia
- Edna Marion as Nora
- Ernest Butterworth as Phil
- Arthur Housman as Tom Martin
- Montagu Love as Jim Martin
- Carl Stockdale as Gitner
- Harry Dunkinson as Sheriff
- Henry Armetta as Shepherd

== Preservation ==
With no holdings located in archives, The Desert's Price is considered a lost film.
