= The Man from Oklahoma (1926 film) =

1926 film by Forrest Sheldon and Harry S. Webb

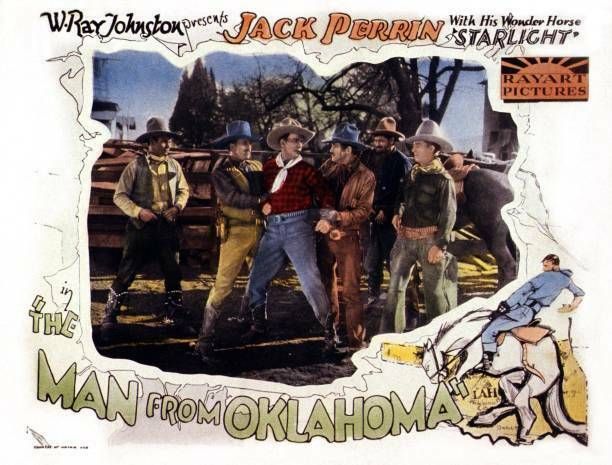
- Directed by: Forrest Sheldon; Harry S. Webb
- Produced by: Harry S. Webb
- Starring: Jack Perrin; Josephine Hill; Lew Meehan
- Production company: Harry Webb Productions
- Distributed by: Rayart Pictures
- Release date: August 4, 1926
- Running time: 55 minutes
- Country: United States
- Languages: Silent; English intertitles

The Man from Oklahoma is a 1926 American silent Western film directed by Forrest Sheldon and Harry S. Webb and starring Jack Perrin, Josephine Hill and Lew Meehan. It was distributed by the independent Rayart Pictures, the predecessor of Monogram Pictures. A print of The Man from Oklahoma exists and is available on DVD.

== Synopsis ==
In a New Mexico town, Lynn Durant is robbed and murdered by Sam Stallings. The Man from Oklahoma arrives in town and eventually discovers Stallings is Durant's killer.

== Cast ==
- Jack Perrin as Man from Oklahoma
- Josephine Hill as Rita Lane
- Lew Meehan as Sam Stallings
- Lafe McKee as Rufus King
- Martin Turner as Mose Jackson
- Edmund Cobb as Lynn Durant
- Starlight the Horse as The Oklahoman's Horse
- Jim Corey as Barfly
- George Hazel as Tall Henchman
- Molly Malone as Rose
- Bud Osborne as Henchman

== Censorship ==
Before The Man from Oklahoma could be exhibited in Kansas, the Kansas Board of Review required the removal of a scene where a man is shot.
