= Jaws of Justice =

1933 film

- Theatrical release poster
- Directed by: Spencer Gordon Bennet
- Screenplay by: Joseph Anthony Roach
- Produced by: Spencer Gordon Bennet; Jack King
- Starring: Jack Perrin; Robert Walker; Ruth Sullivan; Lafe McKee; Lightnin' Teddy; Gene Toler; Kazan the Wonder Dog
- Cinematography: Edward Snyder
- Edited by: Ethel Davey
- Production company: Sol Lesser Productions
- Distributed by: Principal Distributing
- Release date: December 4, 1933
- Running time: 58 minutes
- Country: United States
- Language: English

Jaws of Justice is a 1933 American Western film directed by Spencer Gordon Bennet and written by Joseph Anthony Roach. The film stars Jack Perrin, Robert Walker, Ruth Sullivan, Lafe McKee, Lightnin' Teddy, Gene Toler and Kazan the Wonder Dog. The film was released on December 4, 1933, by Principal Distributing.

== Cast ==
- Jack Perrin as Sergeant Kinkaid
- Robert Walker as Boone Jackson
- Ruth Sullivan as Judy Dean
- Lafe McKee as 'Seeker' Dean
- Lightnin' Teddy as Just a Pal
- Gene Toler as 'Kickabout' Riley
- Kazan the Wonder Dog as Kazan
