= Two-Gun of the Tumbleweed =

1927 film

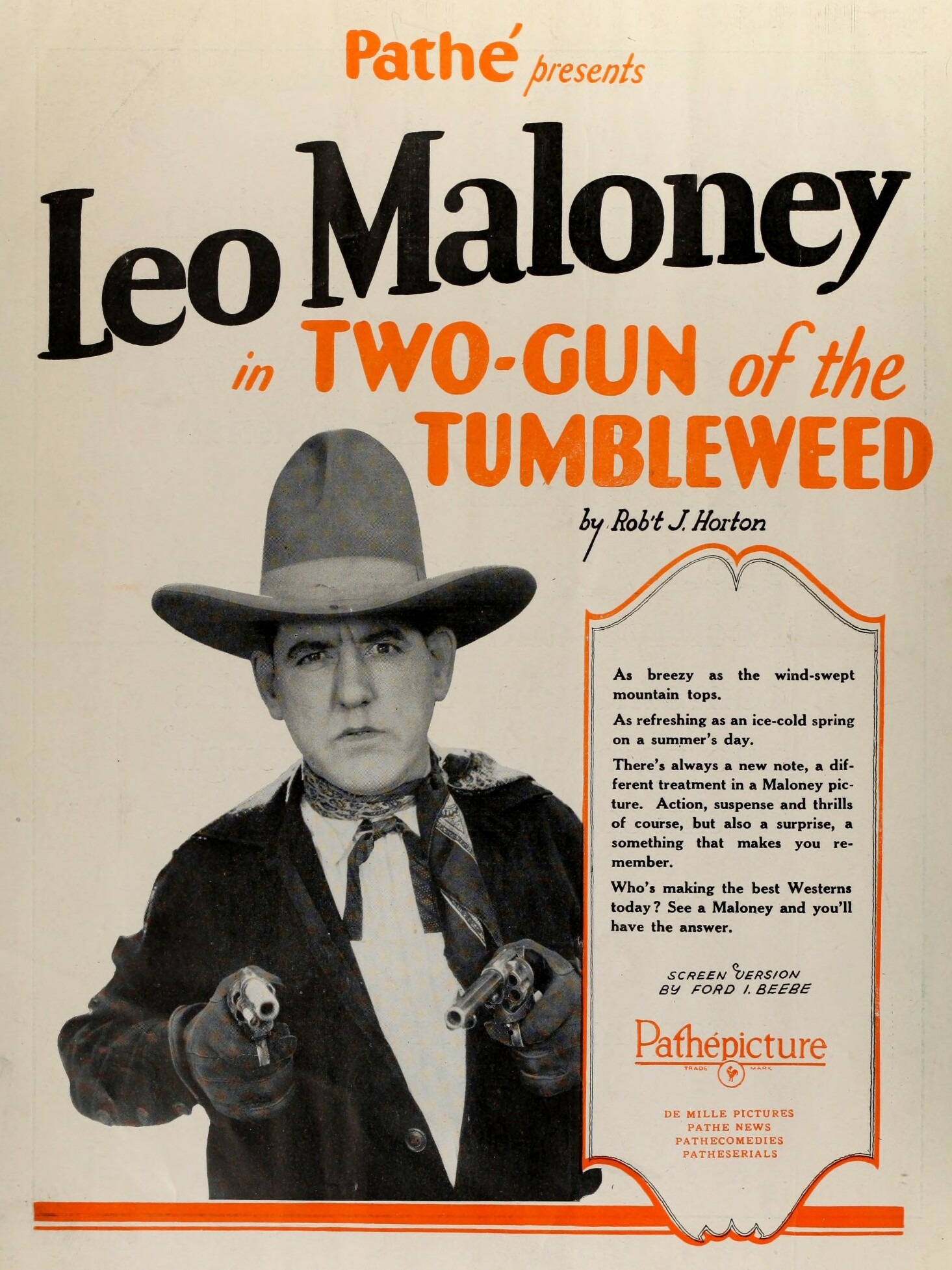
- Directed by: Leo D. Maloney
- Written by: Ford Beebe
- Produced by: Leo D. Maloney
- Starring: Leo D. Maloney; Peggy Montgomery
- Cinematography: Ben White
- Distributed by: Pathé Exchange
- Release date: July 17, 1927
- Running time: 6 reels
- Country: United States
- Language: Silent film...(English intertitles)

Two-Gun of the Tumbleweed is a 1927 American silent Western film directed by and starring Leo D. Maloney and distributed by Pathé Exchange.

The film is listed as lost on a couple of credible websites; however, it survives and is on an omnibus DVD with some William S. Hart titles.

== Cast ==
- Leo D. Maloney - Two-Gun Calder
- Peggy Montgomery - Doris Gibson (uncredited)
- Josephine Hill - Nan Brunelle (uncredited)
- Frederick Dana - Brunelle (uncredited)
- Lew Meehan - Chuck Lang(uncredited)
- Joe Rickson - Darrel (uncredited)
- Whitehorse - Miles (uncredited)
- Bud Osborne -
- Robert Burns - The Sheriff(uncredited)
- Tom Smith -
- Slim Cole -
