= The Jack of Hearts =

1919 film

- Directed by: B. Reeves Eason
- Written by: Anthony Coldeway; Dorothy Rockfort
- Starring: Hoot Gibson
- Distributed by: Universal Film Manufacturing Company
- Release date: September 13, 1919
- Running time: 20 minutes
- Country: United States
- Languages: Silent; English intertitles

The Jack of Hearts is a 1919 American short silent Western film directed by B. Reeves Eason.

== Plot ==
According to a film magazine, "Into the Prairie Dog's snug refuge dashes a disheveled and breathless horseman. He is ravenously hungry and very anxious to know if they have seen the sheriff. The Prairie Dog's bandits have just made a haul and are eating and drinking to their hearts content in token of their safety from pursuit. They take "Jack" to their hearts and feed him.

In a nearby gully a battered prairie schooner has come to anchor. Mary, the daughter, wanders away in the dark, and in the vain endeavor to find her way back to the wagon comes upon the bandits' cabin. Before she realizes the character of the place she is seized and they decide to gamble for her. Jack takes a hand with the others and wins her with a heart flush. The others, however, try to take her from him, and Jack, covering them with bis revolver, throws the girl across his saddle and disappears in the nights.

Mary, who has been almost too terrified to make a sound, is astonished at the gallantry of her captor, but still has little faith in his honor. However, she is unable to bring herself to shoot him when Jack gives her his gun. While Mary is sleeping, a secret message is delivered to the sheriff, a posse is hastily organized and all but the leader of the bandit band are captured. The leader attacks Jack and the girl and is getting the worst of it as the posse comes up and arrests both men. Jack pulls back his coat and shows a badge. He is the sheriff of the next county and has been trying to get the Prairie Dog for two years."

== Cast ==
- Hoot Gibson as The Prairie Dog
- Jack Perrin as Jack, the Man
- M.W. Lindley as the Sheriff
- Josephine Hill as Mary

== See also ==
- Hoot Gibson filmography
