= Border Vengeance (1925 film) =

1925 film

- Directed by: Harry S. Webb
- Written by: Forrest Sheldon
- Produced by: Harry S. Webb
- Starring: Jack Perrin; Josephine Hill; Tom London
- Cinematography: William Thornley
- Production company: Harry Webb Productions
- Distributed by: Rayart Pictures
- Release date: August 12, 1925
- Running time: 48 minutes
- Country: United States
- Languages: Silent; English intertitles

Border Vengeance is a 1925 American silent Western film directed by Harry S. Webb and starring Jack Perrin, Josephine Hill and Tom London.

== Cast ==
- Jack Perrin as Wes Channing
- Josephine Hill as Mary Sims
- Tom London as Flash Denby
- Bud Osborne as Buck Littleton
- Jack Richardson as Mark Newman - Assayer
- Hugh Saxon as Rufe Sims
- Vondell Darr as Bumps Jackson
- Minna Redman as Mrs. Jackson
- Robert MacFarland as Deputy Bill Jones
