= Gun Grit =

1936 film

- Directed by: William Berke
- Written by: Allen Hall; Lewis Kingdon; Gordon Phillips
- Produced by: William Berke
- Starring: Jack Perrin; David Sharpe; Roger Williams.
- Cinematography: Robert E. Cline
- Edited by: Arthur A. Brooks
- Music by: Lee Zahler
- Production company: Berke-Perrin Productions
- Distributed by: Atlantic Pictures
- Release date: May 28, 1936
- Running time: 51 minutes
- Country: United States
- Language: English

The full film

Gun Grit is a 1936 American Western film directed by William Berke and starring Jack Perrin, David Sharpe and Roger Williams. It was produced on Poverty Row as a second feature. The film is also known by the alternative title of Protection Racket in the United Kingdom.

== Plot ==
Gangsters from the big city attempt to expand their empire by establishing a protection racket amongst cattle ranchers but are battled by Federal agent Bob Blake.

== Cast ==
- Jack Perrin as Bob Blake
- Ethel Beck as Jean Hess
- David Sharpe as Dave Hess
- Roger Williams as Mack (Gang Boss)
- Ralph Peters as Henchman Dopey
- Frank Hagney as Henry Hess - an FBI Chief
- Jimmy Aubrey as The Janitor
- Ed Cassidy as Tim Hess (Rancher)
- Phil Dunham as Henchman Looie
- Oscar Gahan as Henchman Don
- Earl Dwire as Uncle Joe Hess
- Horace Murphy as Rancher Sully
- Lester William Berke as Bobby Hess
- Budd Buster as Henchman
- Olin Francis as Murray
- Herman Hack as Federal Agent
- Braveheart as Hess' dog
- Starlight the Horse as Starlight, Bob's horse

== Bibliography ==
- Pitts, Michael R. Poverty Row Studios, 1929–1940. McFarland & Company, 2005.
