= For Ladies Only (film) =

1927 film

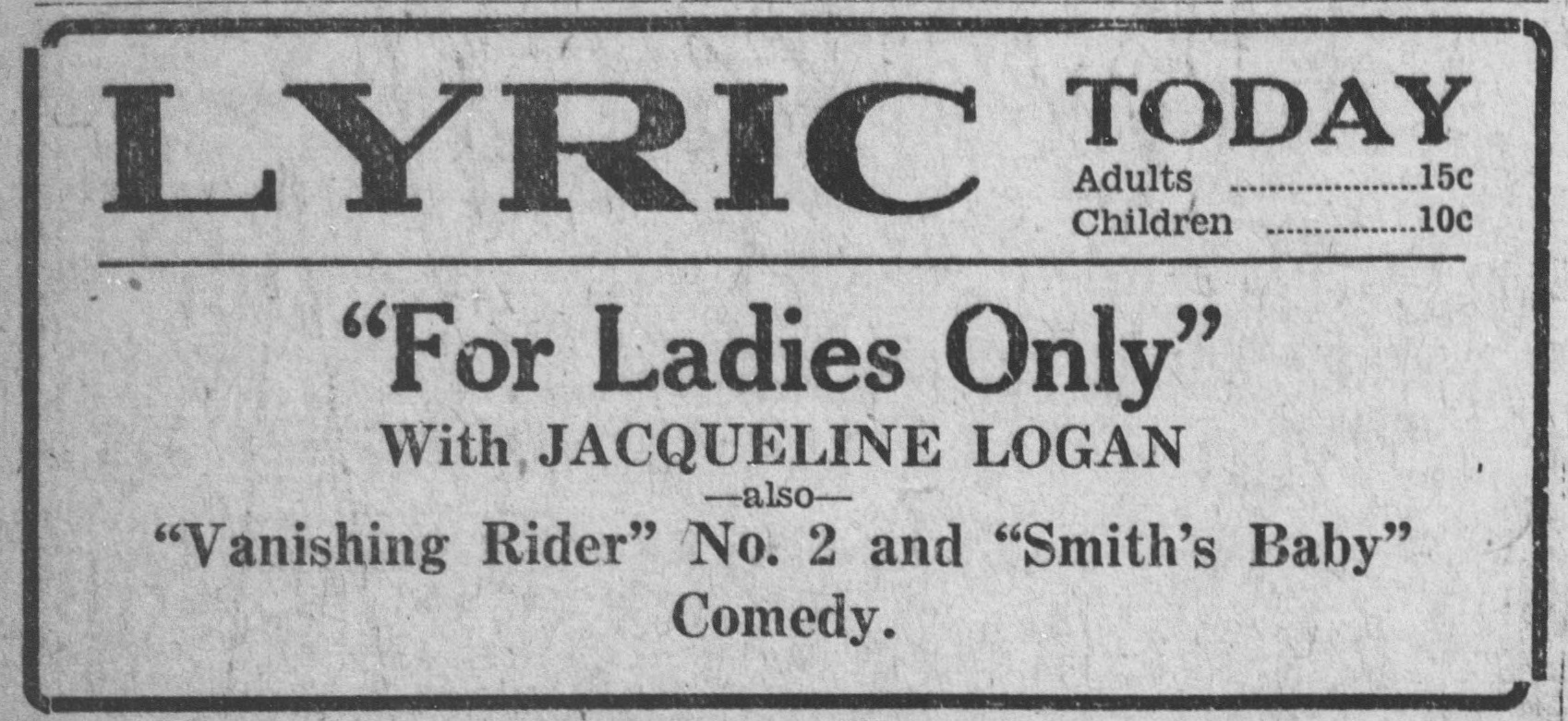
- Contemporary advertisement
- Directed by: Henry Lehrman; Scott Pembroke
- Written by: Robert Lord
- Starring: John Bowers; Jacqueline Logan; Edna Marion
- Cinematography: J.O. Taylor
- Production company: Columbia Pictures
- Distributed by: Columbia Pictures
- Release date: July 20, 1927
- Running time: 57 minutes
- Country: United States
- Languages: Silent; English intertitles

For Ladies Only is a 1927 American silent comedy film directed by Henry Lehrman and Scott Pembroke and starring John Bowers, Jacqueline Logan and Edna Marion.

== Synopsis ==
A businessman thinks that all women are frivolous creatures only interested in clothes, make-up and perfume. He decides to fire all his women employees including his secretary Ruth Barton who warns him he will come to regret it. Finding himself at a loss, he turns to her for advice over business deals, but she makes him pay a great deal for it. Finally she intercepts a major order and directs it towards a rival firm. He is forced to concede defeat and agrees to her demand to let all the women return to their jobs, discovering in the process that he is in love with Ruth.

== Cast ==
- John Bowers as Cliff Coleman
- Jacqueline Logan as Ruth Barton
- Edna Marion as Gertie Long
- Ben Hall as Joe Decker
- William H. Strauss as Mr. Ginsberg
- Templar Saxe
- Kathleen Chambers
- Henry Roquemore

== Preservation and status ==
Complete copies of the film are held at the Cinematheque Royale de Belgique and the George Eastman House.

== Bibliography ==
- Connelly, Robert B. The Silents: Silent Feature Films, 1910-36, Volume 40, Issue 2. December Press, 1998.
- Munden, Kenneth White. The American Film Institute Catalog of Motion Pictures Produced in the United States, Part 1. University of California Press, 1997.
