= The Sheriff's Secret =

1931 film

- Directed by: James P. Hogan
- Written by: James P. Hogan
- Produced by: Robert J. Horner
- Starring: Jack Perrin; Dorothy Bauer; Fred Hargreaves
- Cinematography: Jules Cronjager
- Edited by: Henry Adams
- Production company: Cosmos Productions
- Distributed by: William Steiner Distribution
- Release date: June 14, 1931
- Running time: 58 minutes
- Country: United States
- Language: English

The Sheriff's Secret is a 1931 American Western film directed by James P. Hogan and starring Jack Perrin, Dorothy Bauer and Fred Hargreaves.

== Plot ==
Outlaw Rawlins is accompanied by a child, Bill, and avoids a sheriff's posse by heading into a desert. The boy becomes ill, causing Rawlins to take a doctor from town into the desert to treat him. With the assistance of a girl, Alice, Rawlins turns himself in to the sheriff. Bill and Alice promise to wait for Rawlins to complete his sentence.

== Cast ==
- Jack Perrin as Jack Rawlins
- Dorothy Bauer as Alice
- Fred Hargreaves as Bill
- Joe Smith Marba as Sheriff
- Jimmy Aubrey
- Billy Franey
- George Chesebro

== Bibliography ==
- Michael R. Pitts. Poverty Row Studios, 1929–1940: An Illustrated History of 55 Independent Film Companies, with a Filmography for Each. McFarland & Company, 2005.
