= Gareth Hughes =

British actor

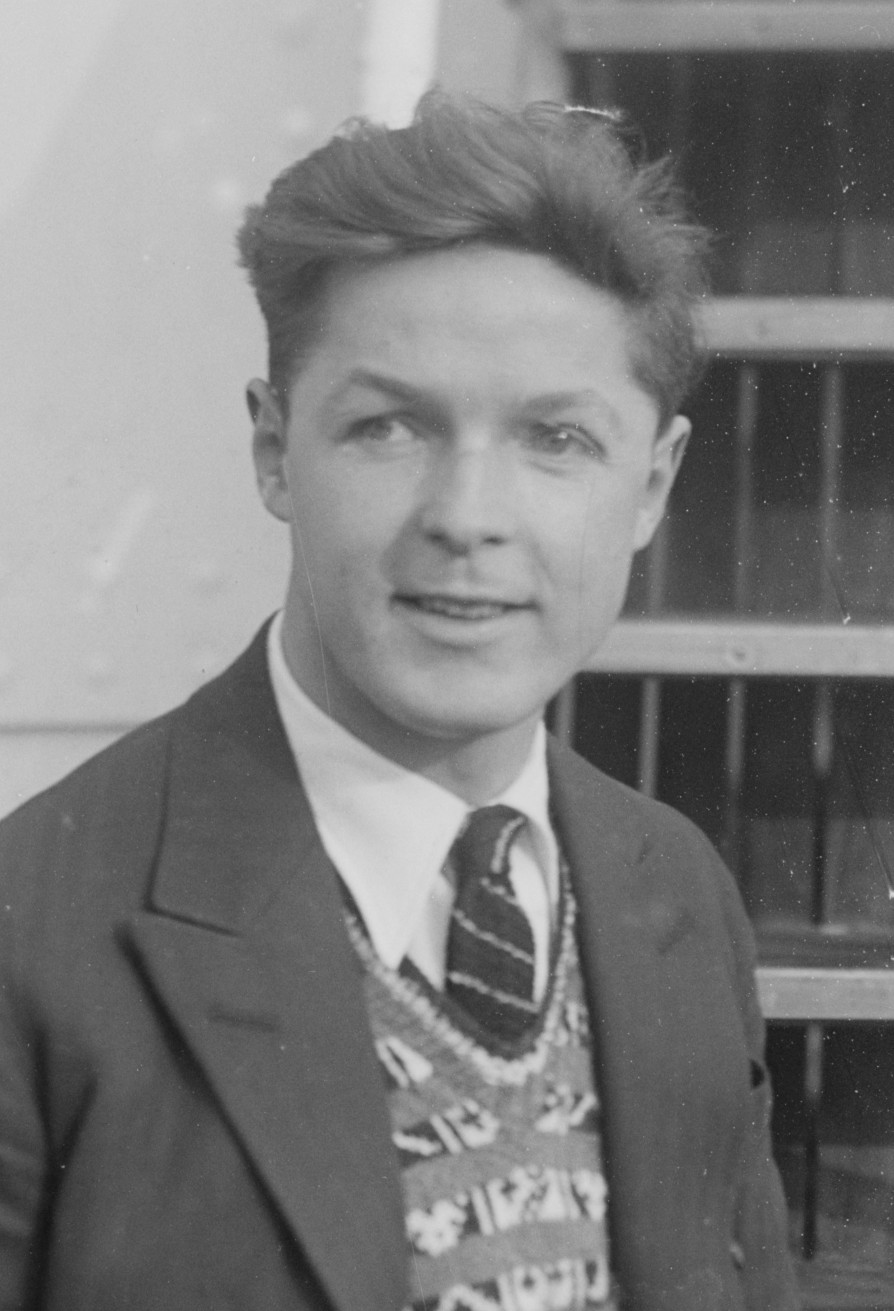
- Born: William John Hughes; 23 August 1894; Dafen, Carmarthenshire, Wales
- Died: 1 October 1965 (aged 71); Motion Picture Country Home, Woodland Hills, Los Angeles, California
- Occupations: Stage actor, silent screen actor, missionary
- Years active: 1918–1944

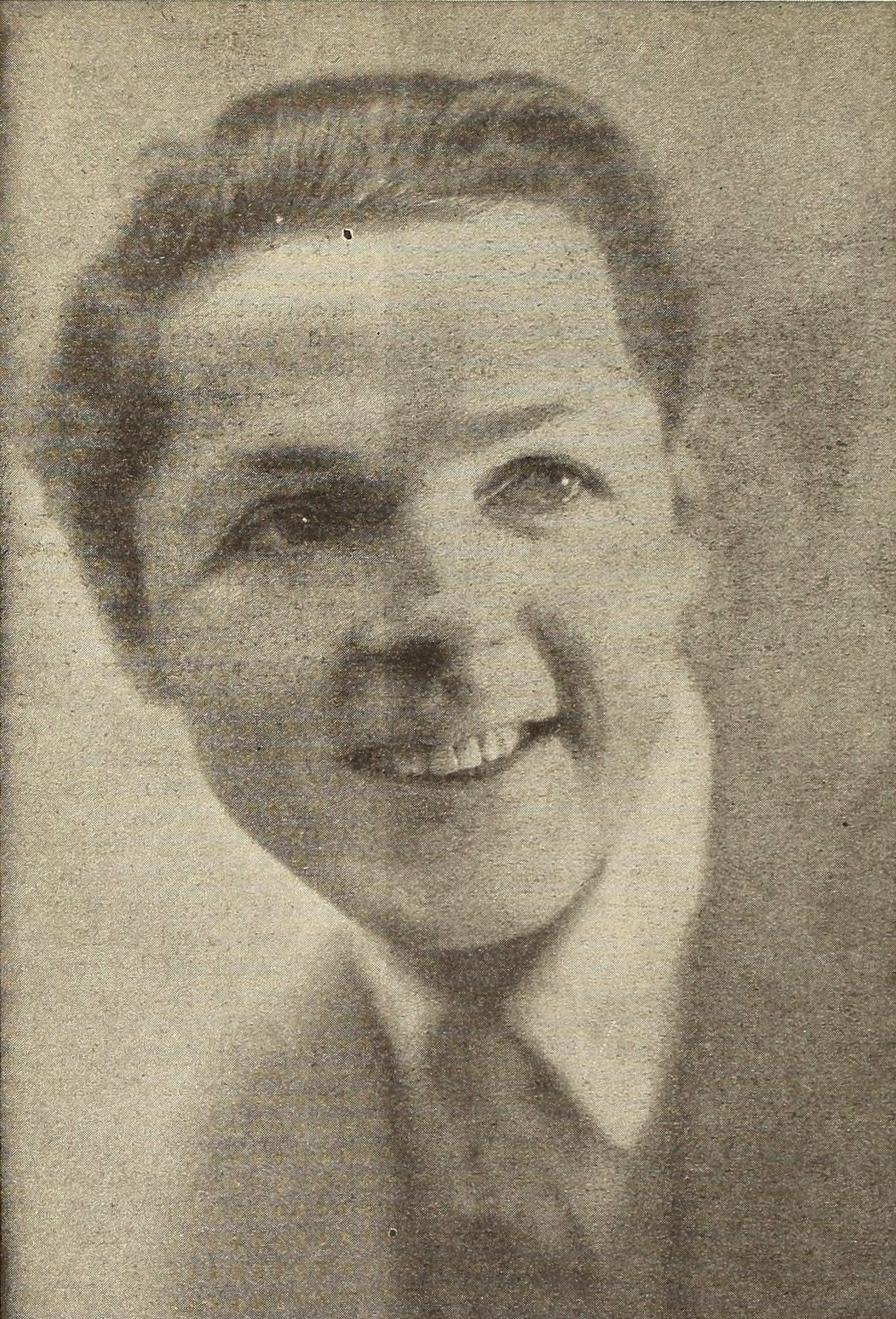
His grin was described as one that "begins almost shyly, and finishes widely" in Picture-Play, July 1921.

Gareth Hughes (born William John Hughes; 23 August 1894 – 1 October 1965) was a Welsh stage and silent screen actor. Usually cast as a callow, sensitive hero in Hollywood silent films, Hughes got his start on stage during childhood and continued to play youthful leads on Broadway.

== Biography ==
Born William John Hughes into a working-class family in Dafen, Carmarthenshire, after working with a number of UK touring companies he joined a group of Welsh players. The group took a tour to the United States, and although not successful Hughes was spotted in Chicago, and stayed in America to pursue his acting career. By the end of 1915, he had become successful on Broadway. This, in turn, led to his involvement in the motion picture business.

=== Film career ===
Hughes's earlier screen work was with Clara Kimball Young in Eyes of Youth (1919) and with Marguerite Clark in Mrs. Wiggs of the Cabbage Patch (1920). He was teamed with Viola Dana in The Chorus Girl's Romance (1920). He signed with Metro Pictures and was loaned to Famous Players Lasky for Sentimental Tommy (1921), probably his best film role.

Even though he had already appeared in many films before this, he regarded Sentimental Tommy as his favourite and most successful. He made forty-five films from 1918 to 1931. He was also the Welsh dialect coach on The Corn Is Green (1945) starring Bette Davis. Cecil B. DeMille called him "a young idealist", and Fulton Oursler described him as "the charm boy to end all charm boys".

=== Return to theatre ===
In 1929, like many others, he lost his fortune in the Wall Street crash and was left penniless, but he carried on making films until 1931 when he appeared in Scareheads. He then decided to leave the world of film and return to theatre, which had always been his first love. His final role ran for 18 weeks at the Hollywood Playhouse in 1938, where he starred as Shylock in The Merchant of Venice.

=== Missionary ===
In the early 1940s, Hughes experienced a religious calling. Adopting the name of Brother David, in 1944, he became a Christian missionary to the Paiute Indians on the Pyramid Lake Reservation of Nevada. Hughes spent almost 14 years with his "children", as he called them.

=== Later years and death ===
In 1958, Hughes returned to Llanelli to spend his final years. But he longed for the sunshine of the West Coast, and after five months he returned to California. Later, Hughes moved into the Motion Picture Country Home in Woodland Hills where he had his own cottage. He baptised silent film actress Clara Kimball Young prior to her death.

He died in 1965 of complications from byssinosis, a lint-born respiratory disease he contracted from years of sorting donated clothing at Pyramid Lake, and his cremated remains were buried at the Masonic Memorial Gardens cemetery in Reno, Nevada.

== Legacy ==
In 2000, the first TV documentary on Hughes's life was produced by Nant Films in collaboration with Stephen Lyons, Hughes's biographer. The programme, in Welsh, was broadcast on S4C. In 2008, his relative Kelvin Guy made a film In Search of Gareth Hughes, which has received only limited release. The film has been neither broadcast nor made available for public viewing.

In 2000, a bronze plaque to Hughes's memory was mounted in Parc Howard Museum (Llanelli) by Stephen Lyons and Hughes's niece; later the same year, a blue plaque at Hughes's boyhood dwelling on Princess Street in Llanelli was unveiled by members of his family. Stephen Lyons, Llanelli Community Heritage also relative Kelvin Guy are responsible for these tributes to this star of the silent film.

The National Library of Wales has designated biographer Stephen Lyons's web site as part of Wales's documentary heritage.

== Filmography ==
- And the Children Pay (1918)
- Every Mother's Son (1918)
- The Woman Under Oath (1919)
- The Isle of Conquest (1919)
- Mrs. Wiggs of the Cabbage Patch (1919)
- Woman, Woman! (1919)
- Ginger (1919)
- The Red Viper (1919)
- Eyes of Youth (1919)
- The Eternal Mother (1920)
- The Chorus Girl's Romance (1920)
- The Woman in His House (1920)
- Sentimental Tommy (1921)
- The Lure of Youth (1921)
- Life's Darn Funny (1921)
- Garments of Truth (1921)
- The Hunch (1921)
- Little Eva Ascends (1922)
- I Can Explain (1922)
- Don't Write Letters (1922)
- Forget Me Not (1922)
- Kick In (1922)
- The Christian (1923)
- Enemies of Women (1923)
- The Spanish Dancer (1923)
- Penrod and Sam (1923)
- Shadows of Paris (1924)
- The Sunset Trail (1924)
- The Midnight Girl (1925)
- Men of the Night (1926)
- Eyes of the Totem (1927)
- The Whirlwind of Youth (1927)
- Broadway After Midnight (1927)
- The Auctioneer (1927)
- In the First Degree (1927)
- Better Days (1927)
- Heroes in Blue (1927)
- The Sky Rider (1928)
- Top Sergeant Mulligan (1928)
- Old Age Handicap (1928)
- Comrades (1928)
- Mister Antonio (1929)
- Silent Sentinel (1929)
- Scareheads (1931)

== See also ==
The Play of Everyman
