= Wild West Whoopee =

1931 film

- Directed by: Robert J. Horner
- Written by: Robert J. Horner; Robert Walker
- Produced by: Robert J. Horner
- Starring: Jack Perrin; Josephine Hill; Buzz Barton
- Cinematography: Jules Cronjager
- Edited by: Arthur A. Brooks
- Production company: Cosmos Productions
- Distributed by: Cosmos Productions
- Release date: March 8, 1931
- Running time: 57 minutes
- Country: United States
- Language: English

Wild West Whoopee is a 1931 American pre-Code Western film directed by Robert J. Horner and starring Jack Perrin, Josephine Hill and Buzz Barton.

== Cast ==
- Jack Perrin
- Josephine Hill
- Buzz Barton
- Fred Church
- Horace B. Carpenter
- John Ince
- George Chesebro
- Henry Roquemore
- Ben Corbett
- Charles Austin
- Walter Patterson

== Bibliography ==
- Michael R. Pitts. Poverty Row Studios, 1929–1940: An Illustrated History of 55 Independent Film Companies, with a Filmography for Each. McFarland & Company, 2005.
