= The Tell Tale Wire =

1919 film

- Directed by: B. Reeves Eason
- Written by: Philip Hubbard; Lillian Valentine
- Starring: Hoot Gibson
- Release date: October 18, 1919
- Running time: 20 minutes
- Country: United States
- Languages: Silent; English intertitles

The Tell Tale Wire is a 1919 American short silent Western film directed by B. Reeves Eason.

== Plot ==
According to a film magazine, "A group of cowboys were peering in at Mary, the new telephone exchange girl, as Steve Larmon, known as the "Gobbler", on account of his stuttering speech, shoots rings around the crowd and gains a coveted position. As Mary takes the night shift she is very nervous. In the bank, the cashier, reaches for his gun, shoots and kills him. Mary, in the telephone exchange, hears the shot.

The professor is sitting at his desk, when Steve enters. As he comes to the table he knocks the telephone over and says, "I killed him". He sees the telephone receiver is down and stutters, "The t-t-teltelephone g-g-gi-girl must h-ha-have heard m-m-me". Mary has overheard and is wild with fear. A door bangs she jumps to her feet. A window falls, blown down by the wind, and with a scream she rushes out into the street. The watchman blowing his whistle, people start running from all directions. Mary is frantic She thinks the men are after her. She runs into Steve, but climbs into a truck that is just leaving, and hides. The Sheriff with a posse starts after the murderer, and insists that Steve join them.

Out in the country, Mary slips out of the truck and hides in a deserted barn. Pete and Joe turn up with a bunch of tough looking men. The Sheriff and his posse, divide. Mary is hidden in the loft. A comb falls out of her hair and drops at the feet of the bandits. Steve has seen the light in the barn and is approaching. Pete climbs up Into the loft and seizes her. Steve hears her scream, looks In, and saves Mary, but is set upon by Pete. They fall through the loft onto the bandits below and a fierce fight starts. Mary escapes, rushes across country, meets the Sheriff, and tells him all. The bandits have been almost overpowered by Steve, when the Sheriff holds him up. Mary rushes in, points to Steve and says, "That is the man that murdered the bank cashier". Steve is dumbfounded, and explains that the words Mary heard over the telephone were only acting. He was taking lessons secretly from the professor to cure him stuttering, and was repeating lines of plays. The night watchman identifies Pete as the murderer. Steve takes Mary home."

== Cast ==
- Hoot Gibson as Steve
- Josephine Hill as Mary
- Leo Pattee as Pete

== See also ==
- Hoot Gibson filmography
