= Trails of Danger =

1930 film

- Directed by: Alan James
- Written by: Allan James; Henry Taylor
- Starring: Hal Taliaferro; Virginia Brown Faire; Jack Perrin
- Cinematography: William Nobles
- Edited by: Ethel Davey
- Release date: 1930
- Running time: 63 minutes
- Country: United States
- Language: English

Trails of Danger is a 1930 American pre-Code Western film directed by Alan James and starring Hal Taliaferro.

== Plot ==
An American soldier returns from World War I without any money and finds himself forced into the life of a western criminal to survive.

== Cast ==
- Hal Taliaferro as Bob Bartlett
- Virginia Brown Faire as Mary Martin
- Jack Perrin as Sheriff Johnson
- Buck Connors as John Martin
- Bobby Dunn as Deputy Shorty
- Pete Morrison as Deputy Tom Weld
- Joe Rickson as U.S. Marshall Bartlett
- Frank Ellis as Butch Coleman
- Hank Bell as Hank

== Reception ==
Trails of Danger was praised by the general population. The Cincinnati Enquirer described the film as having strong acting and "an effective cast."
