= Winning a Woman =

1925 film

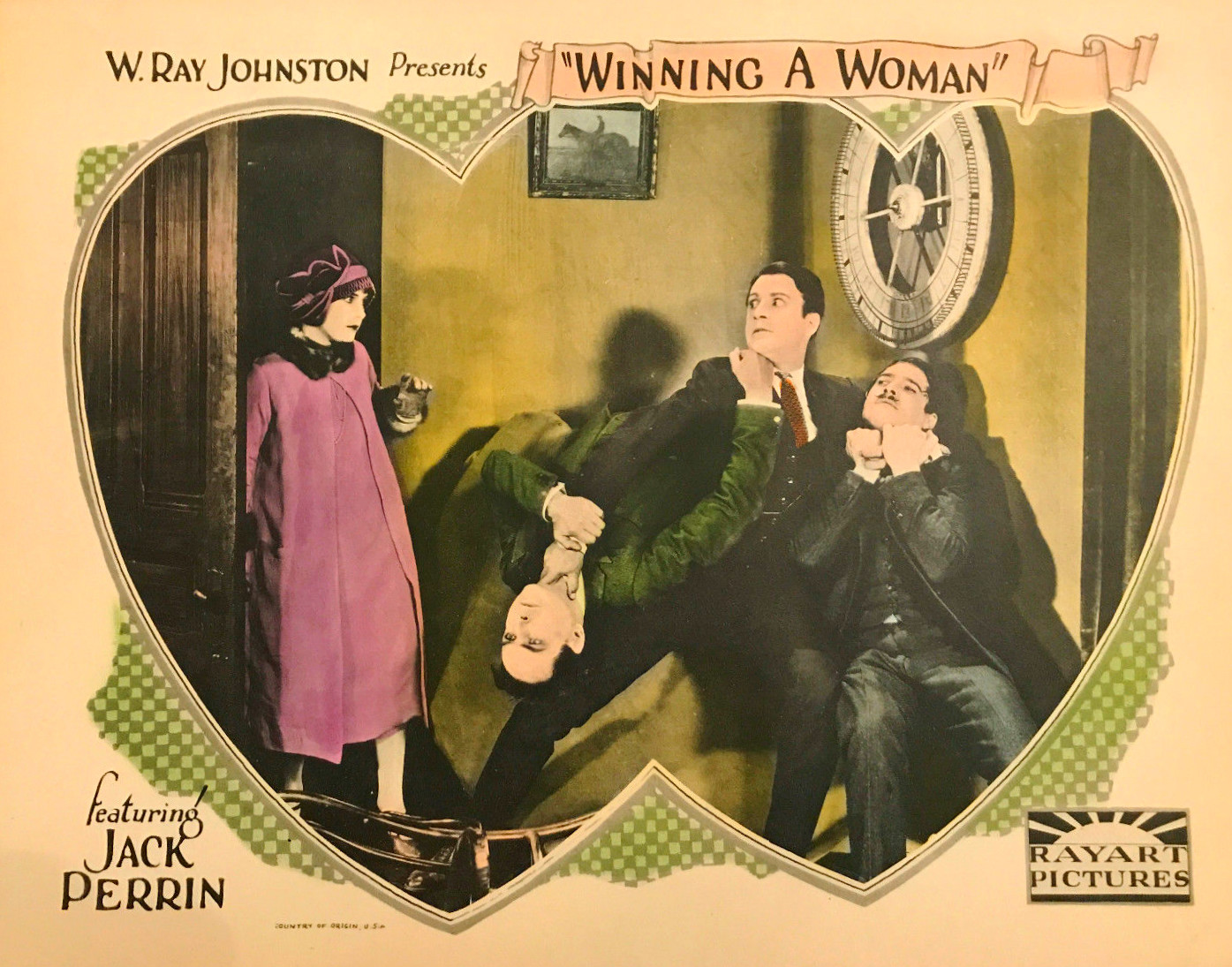
- Directed by: Harry S. Webb
- Written by: Carl Krusada
- Produced by: W. Ray Johnston; Harry S. Webb
- Starring: Jack Perrin; Josephine Hill; William J. Turner
- Production company: Harry Webb Productions
- Distributed by: Rayart Pictures
- Release date: April 1925
- Country: United States
- Languages: Silent; English intertitles

Winning a Woman is a 1925 American silent action film directed by Harry S. Webb and starring Jack Perrin, Josephine Hill and William J. Turner.

== Cast ==
- Jack Perrin
- Josephine Hill
- William J. Turner
- Tom O'Brien

== Bibliography ==
- Munden, Kenneth White. The American Film Institute Catalog of Motion Pictures Produced in the United States, Part 1. University of California Press, 1997.
