= The Kid from Arizona =

1931 film

- Directed by: Robert J. Horner
- Written by: Robert J. Horner; Robert Walker
- Produced by: Robert J. Horner
- Starring: Jack Perrin; Josephine Hill; Robert D. Walker
- Cinematography: Jules Cronjager
- Edited by: Fred Bain
- Production company: Cosmos Productions
- Distributed by: Cosmos Productions
- Release date: May 10, 1931
- Running time: 52 minutes
- Country: United States
- Language: English

The Kid from Arizona is a 1931 American pre-Code Western film directed by Robert J. Horner and starring Jack Perrin, Josephine Hill and Robert D. Walker.

== Cast ==
- Jack Perrin as Marshal Jack
- Josephine Hill as Ranch Owner's Daughter
- Robert D. Walker as The Crooked Foreman / Gang Leader
- Henry Roquemore as The Colonel, Ranch Owner
- George Chesebro as Henchman
- Ben Corbett as Henchman

== Plot ==
A marshal is falsely accused of stealing horses while he is trying to corral a group of renegade Indians. The true culprits turn out to be white men disguised as Indians.

== Bibliography ==
- Michael R. Pitts. Poverty Row Studios, 1929–1940: An Illustrated History of 55 Independent Film Companies, with a Filmography for Each. McFarland & Company, 2005.
