= The Sky Rider =

1928 film

- Directed by: Alan James
- Written by: Alan James; Lon Young
- Produced by: Hans Tiesler
- Starring: Gareth Hughes; Josephine Hill
- Cinematography: M.A. Anderson
- Edited by: Alan James
- Production company: Chesterfield Pictures
- Distributed by: Chesterfield Pictures
- Release date: June 15, 1928
- Running time: 50 minutes
- Country: United States
- Languages: Silent; English intertitles

The Sky Rider is a 1928 American silent drama film directed by Alan James and starring Gareth Hughes and Josephine Hill.

== Cast ==
- Champion the Dog as Champion
- Gareth Hughes as Dick
- Josephine Hill as Alice Allan
- J.P. Lockney as John Wilson
- John Tansey as Joseph
- Lew Meehan as Mike Slaney
- Sheldon Lewis as Doc Shade
- Aline Goodwin as Mrs. Shade

== Bibliography ==
- Michael R. Pitts. Poverty Row Studios, 1929-1940: An Illustrated History of 55 Independent Film Companies, with a Filmography for Each. McFarland & Company, 2005.
