= Riders of the Rio =

1931 film

- Directed by: John Tansey
- Written by: R. E. Barringer
- Produced by: John Tansey; Robert Emmett Tansey
- Starring: Lane Chandler
- Cinematography: Amos Stillman
- Production company: Round-Up Pictures
- Distributed by: states rights distribution
- Release date: December 31, 1931
- Running time: 60 minutes
- Country: United States
- Language: English

Riders of the Rio is a 1931 American western film directed by John Tansey and starring Lane Chandler. It is an independently-produced second feature, partly shot on location around Palm Springs, California.

== Plot ==
Two rival cattle ranchers battle over the affections of Nieta, a beautiful Mexican cantina singer.

== Cast ==
- Lane Chandler as Bob Lane
- Karla Cowan as Nieta
- Benny Corbett as "One-Shot"
- Sheldon Lewis as Tony
- Fred Parker as Dad Lane
- Jack Kirk as "Tim", Bob Lane's pal
- Sherry Tansey as "Buck"
- Bud Duncan as The Peddler
- Mary Thompson as Mrs. Lane
- Bob Card as Travis
- H. B. Carpenter as Sheriff
- Amleio Mio as Captain Fernandez
- Lorena Carr as Doris Hart
- Owen McLean as The Wrangler

== Bibliography ==
- Pitts, Michael R. Western Movies: A Guide to 5,105 Feature Films. McFarland, 2012.
