= Robert J. Horner =

American film producer (1894–1942)

- Born: September 14, 1894; Spring Valley, Illinois, United States
- Died: July 29, 1942 (aged 47); El Paso, Texas, United States
- Other names: Royal Hampton; Bob Horner; Robert Hoyt; R.J. Renroh
- Occupations: Film producer Film director Screenwriter
- Years active: 1920-1935

Robert J. Horner (September 14, 1894 – July 29, 1942) was an American film producer, director and screenwriter. He produced more than 40 films between 1922 and 1935. He also directed more than 30 films between 1921 and 1935. Horner died on July 29, 1942, at the El Paso, Texas City-County Hospital, and the cause of death was cirrhosis of the liver.

== Selected filmography ==
- The Champion Liar (1920) (writer)
- The Smilin' Kid (1920) (writer)
- Midnight Secrets (1924) (producer, writer)
- Virginian Outcast (1924) (producer, director)
- The Pell Street Mystery (1924) (producer)
- Pony Express Rider (1926) (writer, director, producer)
- Walloping Kid (1926) (writer, director, producer)
- Across the Plains (1928) (writer, director, producer)
- The Mystery Rider (1928) (writer)
- Trails of Treachery (1928) (director)
- Cheyenne Trails (1928) (director, producer)
- Fighters of the Saddle (1929) (director)
- The White Outlaw (1929) (director)
- The Cheyenne Kid (1930) (producer)
- The Apache Kid's Escape (1930) (writer, producer and director)
- Trails of the Golden West (1931) (producer)
- Wild West Whoopee (1931) (writer, producer and director)
- Pueblo Terror (1931) (producer)
- The Kid from Arizona (1931) (co-writer, producer and director)
- The Sheriff's Secret (1931) (producer)
- Lariats and Six-Shooters (1931) (producer)
- Riders of Golden Gulch (1932) (producer)
- 45 Calibre Echo (1932) (producer)
- Tex Takes a Holiday (1932) (producer)
- The Whirlwind Rider (1933) (producer and director)
- Trails of Adventure (1933) (producer)
- Border Guns (1934) (producer and director)
- The Border Menace (1934) (writer and co-producer)
- Western Racketeers (1934) (co-producer and director)
- Racketeer Roundup (AKA: Gunners and Guns) (1934) (co-producer and director)
- The Phantom Cowboy (1935) (co-producer and director)
- Defying The Law (1935) (co-producer and director)
