= Barnaby Lee (film) =

1917 silent film

- Directed by: Edward H. Griffith
- Written by: John Bennett (story); E. Clement D'Art
- Starring: John Tansey; Samuel N. Niblack; Hugh Thompson
- Production company: Edison Studios
- Distributed by: Forum films
- Release date: July 28, 1917
- Running time: 50 minutes
- Country: United States
- Languages: Silent; English intertitles

Barnaby Lee is a 1917 American silent historical drama film directed by Edward H. Griffith and starring John Tansey, Samuel N. Niblack and Hugh Thompson.

== Cast ==
- John Tansey as Barnaby Lee
- Samuel N. Niblack as Harry Lee
- Hugh Thompson as John King
- Charles Edwards as Philip Calvert
- William Wadsworth as Gunner Kieger
- Jack Ridgeway as The Schout Fiskaal
- Norbert Wicki as Mynheer Van Swringen
- Claire Adams as Dorothy Van Swearingen
- Jessie Stevens as Mevrouw Barbara Van Swearingen
- Joseph Burke as Peter Stuyvesant
- Alexander Rene as Charles Calvert

== Bibliography ==
- Alan Gevinson. Within Our Gates: Ethnicity in American Feature Films, 1911-1960. University of California Press, 1997.
