= Edna Marion =

American actress (1906–1957)

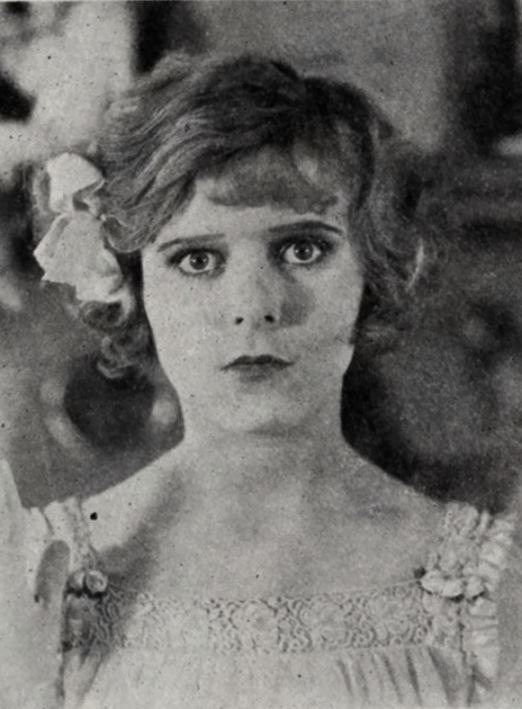
- Marion in 1928
- Born: Edna Marion Hannam; December 12, 1906; Chicago, Illinois
- Died: December 2, 1957 (aged 50); Los Angeles, California
- Resting place: Holy Cross Cemetery, Culver City, California
- Other names: Edna Marian
- Occupation: Actress
- Years active: 1924–1932
- Spouses: William E. Paxson (divorced): Harold Naisbitt

Edna Marion (born Edna Marion Hannam; December 12, 1906 – December 2, 1957) was an American silent film actress who appeared in a number of Hal Roach comedy short films.

== Early years ==
Marion was born on December 12, 1906, in Chicago, Illinois, and she attended a private school in New York.

== Career ==
Before Marion acted in films she performed in vaudeville and on stage in Los Angeles and New York.

Marion's career at the Hal Roach Studios ended abruptly on April 7, 1928, after being employed since April 25, 1927. She also worked for the Century, Paramount, and Universal film studios.

In 1926, Marion was named one of the WAMPAS Baby Stars, along with Mary Astor, Mary Brian, Dolores Costello, Joan Crawford, Dolores del Río, Janet Gaynor, and Fay Wray.

== Personal life and death ==
Marion married W. E. Paxon in Santa Barbara, California, on November 9, 1929. Her death certificate states she was a housewife when she died on December 2, 1957, in Los Angeles from pneumonia, and her husband was Harold Naisbitt.

== Partial filmography ==
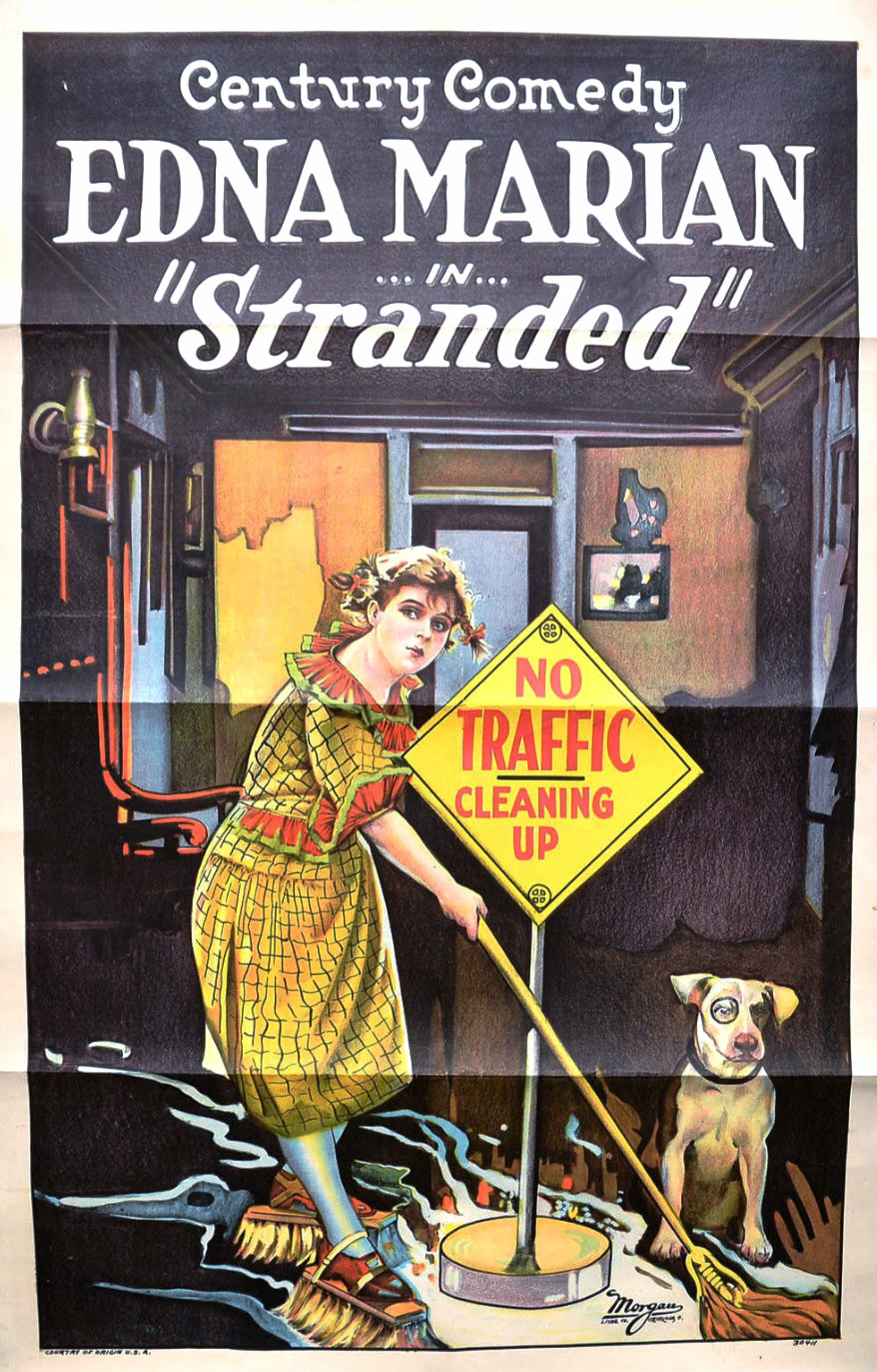
Marion in 1925 movie poster

Year	Title	Role	Notes
1925	The Desert's Price	Nora	
1926	The Mad Racer		Short
1926	The Call of the Wilderness	Dorothy Deveau	
1926	The Still Alarm	Drina Fay	
1927	For Ladies Only	Gertie Long	
1927	Sugar Daddies	Daughter	Short
1927	Now I'll Tell One	Wife	
1928	From Soup to Nuts	Maid	Short, Uncredited
1928	Barnum & Ringling, Inc.	Maid	Short
1928	Should Married Men Go Home?	Blonde Girlfriend	Short, Uncredited
1928	Sinner's Parade	Connie Adams	
1929	Skinner Steps Out	Neighbor's Wife	
1930	Romance of the West	Mary Winters	
1930	Today	Gloria Vernon	
1931	Marriage Rows		Short
1932	Murders in the Rue Morgue	Mignette	Uncredited, (final film role)
