= Now I'll Tell One =

1927 film

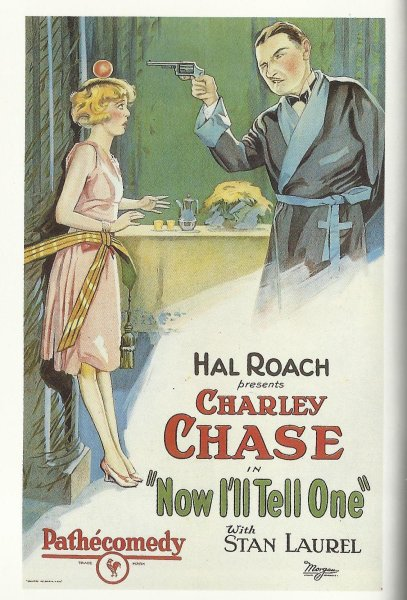
- Directed by: James Parrott
- Produced by: Hal Roach
- Starring: Charley Chase; Edna Marion; Stan Laurel; Oliver Hardy
- Distributed by: Pathé
- Release date: October 5, 1927
- Running time: 20 min. 8 min. ca. (remained cut)
- Country: United States
- Languages: Silent film English intertitles

Now I'll Tell One is a 1927 silent film starring Charley Chase. The film features Stan Laurel and Oliver Hardy, prior to their official billing as the duo Laurel and Hardy. Both comedians had bit parts and share no scenes together.

The first half of the film is considered lost; only the latter half survives.

== Plot ==
The second reel of Now I'll Tell One

A husband is being divorced by his wife. She recounts his cruelty, abuse, and drunkenness before a judge at court. His lawyer attempts to defend him but only succeeds in making his client look worse. Oliver Hardy has a small part as a police officer.

== Cast ==
- Charley Chase as Charley
- Edna Marion as Wife
- Stan Laurel as Lawyer
- Will Walling as Judge
- Oliver Hardy as Policeman
- Wilson Benge
- Lincoln Plummer
- May Wallace

== See also ==
- List of incomplete or partially lost films
