= Crossing Trails =

1921 film

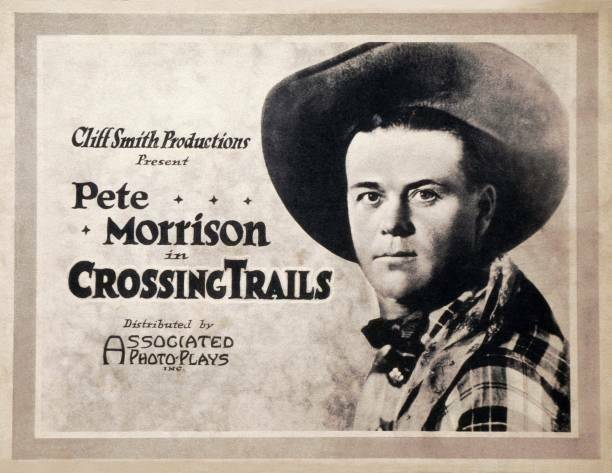
- Directed by: Clifford Smith
- Written by: Alan James; L.V. Jefferson
- Produced by: Pete Morrison; Clifford Smith
- Starring: Pete Morrison; Esther Ralston; Lew Meehan
- Cinematography: John Thompson
- Production company: Cliff Smith Productions
- Distributed by: Associated Photoplays
- Release date: November 23, 1921
- Running time: 50 minutes
- Country: United States
- Languages: Silent; English intertitles

Crossing Trails is a 1921 American silent Western film directed by Clifford Smith and starring Pete Morrison, Esther Ralston and Lew Meehan.

== Cast ==
- Pete Morrison as Jim Warren
- Esther Ralston as Helen Stratton
- John Hatton as Buster Stratton
- Lew Meehan as 'Red' Murphy
- Hal Taliaferro as Peter Marcus
- J.B. Warner as 'Bull' Devine
- Billie Bennett as Mrs Warren

== Preservation ==
With no holdings located in archives, Crossing Trails is considered a lost film.

== Bibliography ==
- Connelly, Robert B. The Silents: Silent Feature Films, 1910-36, Volume 40, Issue 2. December Press, 1998.
- Munden, Kenneth White. The American Film Institute Catalog of Motion Pictures Produced in the United States, Part 1. University of California Press, 1997.
