= Lew Meehan =

American actor (1890-1951)

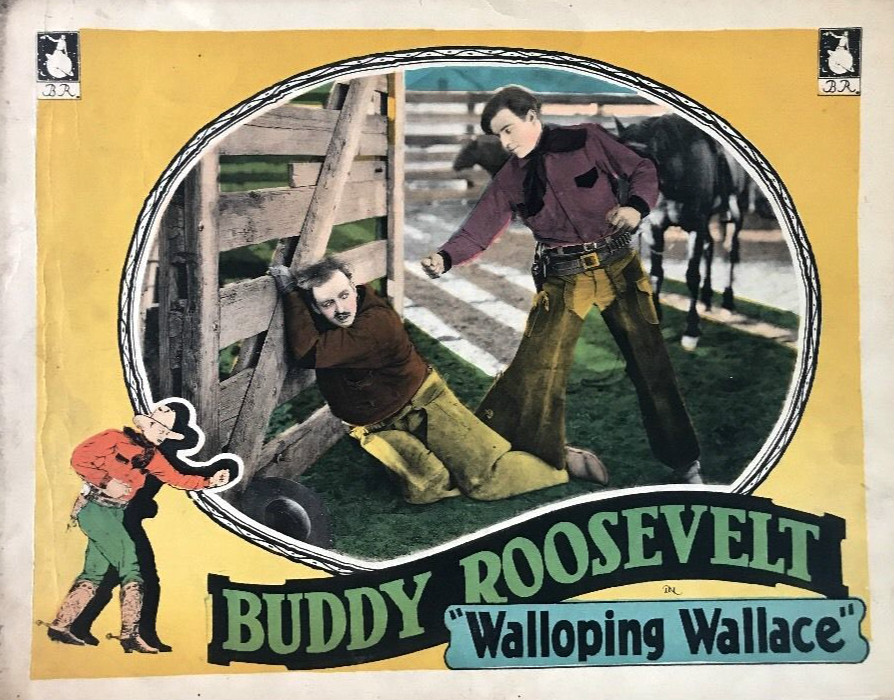
- Lobby card for Walloping Wallace (1924) with Lew Meehan and Buddy Roosevelt
- Born: September 7, 1890; Minneapolis, Minnesota, U.S.
- Died: August 10, 1951 (aged 60); Los Angeles, California, U.S.
- Occupation: Actor
- Years active: 1921-1947

James Lew Meehan (September 7, 1890 – August 10, 1951) was an American film actor.

Meehan appeared in more than 200 films between 1921 and 1947. He was often the main villain in silent Westerns, but in sound films he was usually an "anonymous henchman". Meehan was born in Minnesota and died in Los Angeles, California.

Meehan's daughter, Jean Stratton, was an actress.

== Selected filmography ==
- Crossing Trails (1921)
- By Right of Birth (1921)
- Blazing Arrows (1922)
- The Radio King (1922)
- Silver Spurs (1922)
- Daring Danger (1922)
- Back Fire (1922)
- The Greatest Menace (1923)
- Ridgeway of Montana (1924)
- Thundering Romance (1924)
- Walloping Wallace (1924)
- The Eagle's Claw (1924)
- West of Hot Dog (1924)
- Full Speed (1925)
- The Empty Saddle (1925)
- Red Blood (1925)
- Fighting Luck (1925)
- White Thunder (1925)
- Lord Jim (1925)
- Beyond All Odds (1926)
- The Road Agent (1926)
- The Man from Oklahoma (1926)
- Hair-Trigger Baxter (1926)
- The Desperate Game (1926)
- The Desert's Toll (1926)
- Born to Battle (1927)
- Thunderbolt's Tracks (1927)
- Two-Gun of the Tumbleweed (1927)
- Should Tall Men Marry? (1928)
- The Sky Rider (1928)
- The Power of the Press (1928)
- Idaho Red (1929)
- The Pride of Pawnee (1929)
- Bad Men's Money (1929)
- The White Outlaw (1929)
- Silent Sentinel (1929)
- Thunderbolt (1929)
- Playing Around (1930)
- Firebrand Jordan (1930)
- The Light of Western Stars (1930)
- The Virtuous Sin (1930)
- New Moon (1930)
- Cimarron (1931)
- Range Feud (1931)
- Air Eagles (1931)
- West of Cheyenne (1931)
- The Fighting Fool (1932)
- Forbidden Trail (1932)
- Law and Order (1932)
- Shopworn (1932)
- Thirteen Women (1932)
- The Wolf Dog (1933, Serial)
- The World Changes (1933)
- Unknown Valley (1933)
- Among the Missing (1934)
- The Man Trailer (1934)
- Wagon Wheels (1934)
- Frontier Days (1934)
- Mystery Mountain (1934, Serial)
- The Desert Trail (1935)
- Outlaw Rule (1935)
- Wagon Trail (1935)
- The Phantom Cowboy (1935)
- Lightning Triggers (1935)
- The Last of the Clintons (1935)
- Five Bad Men (1935)
- Annie Oakley (1935)
- The Lawless Nineties (1936)
- Feud of the West (1936)
- Oh, Susanna! (1936)
- Hopalong Cassidy Returns (1936)
- Melody of the Plains (1937)
- Westbound Mail (1937)
- Lightnin' Crandall (1937)
- Trail of Vengeance (1937)
- The Red Rope (1937)
- Trapped (1937)
- Ridin' the Lone Trail (1937)
- Arizona Gunfighter (1937)
- Thunder in the Desert (1938)
- The Feud Maker (1938)
- Prairie Moon (1938)
- The Shadow (1940, Serial)
- The Return of Frank James (1940)
- Roaring Frontiers (1941)
- The Utah Kid (1944)
