= Get That Man =

- DVD release poster
- Directed by: Spencer Gordon Bennet
- Written by: Betty Burbridge
- Produced by: Spencer Gordon Bennet; Lester F. Scott, Jr.
- Starring: Wallace Ford; Leon Ames
- Cinematography: James S. Brown Jr.
- Edited by: Ethel Davey
- Music by: Lee Zahler
- Production company: Scott-Bennet Production
- Distributed by: Mayfair Pictures
- Release date: July 11, 1935
- Running time: 58 minutes
- Country: United States
- Language: English

Get That Man is a 1935 American drama film directed by Spencer Gordon Bennet, from a screenplay by Betty Burbridge. It stars Wallace Ford as Jack Kirkland, a taxi driver who discovers he closely resembles the murdered heir to a fortune. Ford also plays the murdered heir, John Prescott.

Due to a failure to renew copyright, it is now in the public domain.

== Cast ==
- Wallace Ford as Jack Kirkland/John Prescott
- Finis Barton as Diane Prescott
- E. Alyn Warren as Jay Malone
- Leon Ames as Don Malone
- Lillian Miles as Fay Prescott
- Laura Treadwell as Mrs. Prescott
- William Humphries as Mr. Brownlee
- Johnstone White as Mr. Joyce

== Release ==
Originally released on July 11, 1935, Get That Man appears regularly on many public domain DVD compilations. It was released as a standalone disc on July 26, 2011 by Alpha Video.

=== Reception ===
Hal Erickson graded Get That Man with two out of five stars.
