= Jack Perrin =

American actor (1896–1967)

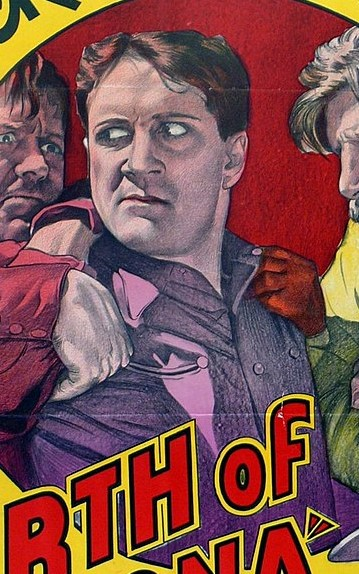
- Perrin on the poster for North of Arizona (1935)
- Born: Lyman Wakefield Perrin; July 25, 1896; Three Rivers, Michigan, U.S.
- Died: December 17, 1967 (aged 71); Hollywood, California, U.S.
- Other names: Jack Gable; Richard Terry
- Occupation: Actor
- Years active: 1917–1941
- Spouses: Josephine Hill (m. 1920; div. 1937) Ethel Compton (m. 1943)
- Children: 1
- Awards: Star on the Hollywood Walk of Fame

Jack Perrin (born Lyman Wakefield Perrin; July 25, 1896 – December 17, 1967) was an American actor specializing in Westerns.

== Early life ==
Perrin was born in Three Rivers, Michigan. His father worked in real estate and relocated the family to Los Angeles, California shortly after the start of the 20th century.

== Career ==
Perrin served in the United States Navy during World War I. Following the war, he returned to Los Angeles and started acting for Universal Studios. His first on-screen appearance was in the 1917 film Luke's Lost Liberty alongside Harold Lloyd. During the 1920s, Perrin made a name for himself, starring in a number of cliffhanger, melodrama, and serial films. Perrin found a niche in B-movie Westerns of the 1930s. He usually played leads as Jack Perrin, but occasionally adopted the pseudonyms Jack Gable or Richard (Dick) Terry.

In 1960 Perrin appeared (uncredited) as Barfly on Cheyenne in the episode titled "Alibi for the Scalped Man." In 1961 Perrin appeared (uncredited) as a Courtroom Spectator on the TV western Lawman in the episode titled "Detweiler's Kid." That same year he also appeared (uncredited) as Barfly on Lawman in the episode titled "Owny O'Reilly" and also (uncredited) as a Townsman on Bat Masterson in the episode titled "Episode In Eden."

Perrin's last major role was as Davy Crockett in 1937's The Painted Stallion, for Republic Pictures. Though he continued making films through 1960, many of his later roles were minor and often went un-credited.

For his contributions as an actor in motion pictures, Jack Perrin was awarded a star on the Hollywood Walk of Fame at 1777 Vine Street, in Hollywood, California.

== Family ==
Perrin married silent film actress Josephine Hill in 1920 and the two divorced in 1937.

== Death ==
Perrin suffered a heart attack and died December 17, 1967, aged 71.

== Selected filmography ==
- Black Eyes and Blue (Short) (1916) as Diner
- His Last Scent (Short) (1916)
- Luke's Lost Liberty (Short) (1917)
- Lonesome Luke's Lively Life (Short) (1917)
- Cactus Nell (Short) (1917) as Banjo Player
- A Royal Rogue (Short) (1917)
- His Speedy Finish (Short) (1917) as Cop
- His Sudden Rival (Short) (1917)
- His Unconscious Conscience (Short) (1917)
- His Marriage Failure (Short) (1917)
- A Love Case (Short) (1917)
- Adventurous Ambrose (Short) (1918) as U.R. Dunn the First
- Ambrose, the Lion Hearted (Short) (1918) as Hair-Oil Hal
- Ambrose's Icy Love (Short) (1918) as Jack Frost
- Ambrose and His Widow (Short) (1918)
- The Wild Rider (Short) (1919)
- Cyclone Smith Plays Trumps (Short) (1919)
- Cyclone Smith's Comeback (Short) (1919)
- Cyclone Smith's Partner (Short) (1919)
- Two Men of Tinted Butte (Short) (1919)
- At the Point of a Gun (Short) (1919)
- Toton (1919) as Carew
- The Lion Man (1919) as Jim Westcott
- The Jack of Hearts (Short) (1919) as Jack the Man
- The Four-Bit Man (Short) (1919)
- The Fighting Heart (Short) (1919)
- Blind Husbands (1919) as Honeymooner
- One He Man (Short) (1920)
- Pink Tights (1920) as Reverend Jonathan Meek
- Lahoma (1920) as Will Compton
- The Adorable Savage (1920) as Templeton
- The Grip of the Law (Short) (1921) as Cal Newton
- The Pony Express Rider (Short) (1921)
- Big Bob (Short) (1921) as Big Bob the Texas Ranger
- The Midnight Raiders (Short) (1921) as Jack
- The Knockout Man (Short) (1921) as Dick Conlon
- The Trigger Trail (Short) (1921) as Lone McCarthy
- Double-Crossed (Short) (1921)
- The Outlaw (Short) (1921) as Dandy Dan the Outlaw
- The Guilty Trail (Short) (1921) as Art Somers
- The Danger Man (Short) (1921)
- Stand Up and Fight (Short) (1921)
- Fighting Blood (Short) (1921)
- Valley of the Rogues (Short) (1921)
- Rim of the Desert (Short) (1921)
- Both Barrels (Short) (1921) as Jack Henderson
- A Battle of Wits (Short) (1921) as Bud Harris
- In the Nick of Time (Short) (1921) as Jack Peat
- The Match-Breaker (1921) as Thomas Butler, Jr.
- Partners of the Tide (1921) as Bradley Nickerson
- The Torrent (1921) as Lieutenant Paul Mack
- The Rage of Paris (1921) as Gordon Talbut
- A Blue-Jacket's Honor (Short) (1922)
- The Further Adventures of Yorke Norroy (Short) (1922)
- The Phantom Terror (Short) (1922)
- The Guttersnipe (1922) as Tom Gilroy
- The Dangerous Little Demon (1922) as Kenneth Graham
- The Trouper (1922) as Herman Jenks
- One of Three (Short) (1923)
- The Showdown (Short) (1923)
- Under Secret Orders (Short) (1923) as Robert Gordon
- Mary of the Movies (1923) as Jack
- The Santa Fe Trail (1923) as Kit Carson
- The Fighting Skipper (1923)
- Western Justice (1923)
- Golden Silence (1923)
- The Lone Horseman (1923) as Harry Elliott
- Those who Dance (1924) as Frank Church
- Riders of the Plains (1924)
- Ridin' West (1924)
- Up and at 'Em (1924)
- Virginian Outcast (1924) as The Stranger
- Why Get Married? (1924) as Jack Wainwright
- Crashin' Through (1924) as Jack Lawton
- Coyote Fangs (1924) as Jack Burroughs
- Travelin' Fast (1924) as Jack Foster
- Lightnin' Jack (1924) as Lightnin' Jack Hardy
- Shootin' Square (1924) as Dan Dawson
- Double Fisted (1925)
- Canyon Rustlers (1925)
- Winning a Woman (1925)
- Desert Madness (1925)
- Border Vengeance (1925) as Wes Channing
- The Knockout Kid (1925) as Jack Lanning
- Silent Sheldon (1925) as Jack 'Silent' Sheldon
- Cactus Trails (1925) as Jack Wiley
- Dangerous Fists (1925) as Jack Pearson
- Starlight, the Untamed (1925) as Jack Barham
- Mistaken Orders (1925) as Tom Lawson
- The Open Switch (1925) as Jack Strong
- Starlight's Revenge (1926)
- The Grey Devil (1926)
- A Ridin' Gent (1926)
- Dangerous Traffic (1926) as Tom Kennedy
- The Thunderbolt Strikes (1926) as Jack Carson
- The Man from Oklahoma (1926) as Man from Oklahoma
- Midnight Faces (1926) as Richard Mason
- West of the Rainbow's End (1926) as Don Brandon
- Hi-Jacking Rustlers (1926) as Larry Benson
- Danger Ahead (1927 film) (Short)
- Blind Man's Bluff (1927 film) (Short) (1927) as Bob MacKeller
- South of the Northern Lights (Short) (1927) as Corporal Jack
- King of Hearts (1927 film) (Short) as Dick O'Malley, R.C.M.P.
- Code of the Range (film) (1927)
- Thunderbolt's Tracks (1927) as Sergeant Larry Donovan
- Fire and Steel (1927) as Terry O'Farrell
- The Laffin' Fool (1927) as Jack
- Where the North Holds Sway (1927) as Rance Raine, R.N.W.M.P.
- Sealed Orders (1928 film) (Short) (1928) as Bruce Wallace, R.C.M.P.
- Bare Fists (1928 film) (Short) (1928) as Jerry Masters, R.C.M.P.
- The Ruse (1928 film) (Short) (1928) as John Allen R.C.M.P.
- The Iron Code (Short) (1928) as Bob Frazer R.C.M.P.
- The Dangerous Trail (Short) (1928) as Paul O'Malley R.C.M.P.
- Yukon Gold (1928 film) (Short) (1928) as Bob McKenzie R.C.M.P.
- The Ring Leader (1928 film) (Short) (1928) as The Mountie
- The Code of the Mounted (1928 film) (Short) (1928) as The Mountie
- Madden of the Mounted (Short) (1928) as Madden of the Mounted
- Vultures of the Sea (1928)
- The Vanishing West (1928) as Jack Marvin
- Wild Blood (1928) as Jack Crosby
- The Water Hole (1928) as Ray
- Two Outlaws (1928) as Phil Manners / The Lone Rider
- Guardians of the Wild (1928) as Jerry Lane
- Go Get 'Em Kid (Short) (1929)
- Hoofbeats of Vengeance (1929) as Sergeant Jack Gordon
- Overland Bound (1929) as Larry Withers / Jimmy Winters
- The Harvest of Hate (1929) as Jack Merritt
- Plunging Hoofs (1929) as Parson Jed Campbell
- The Lone Star Ranger (1930 film) (1930) as Texas Ranger (uncredited)
- The Jade Box (1930) as Jack Lamar
- Romance of the West (1930) as Jack Walsh
- Beyond the Rio Grande (1930) as Bert Allen
- The Apache Kid's Escape (1930) as Jim the Apache Kid
- The Phantom of the Desert (1930) as Jack Saunders
- Ridin' Law (1930) as Jack Rowland
- Lariats and Six-Shooters (1931) as Jack
- Wild West Whoopee (1931) as Jim Logan
- Trails of Danger (1931) as Sheriff Johnson
- The Sheriff's Secret (1931) as Jack Rawlins
- Two-Gun Caballero (1931) as Sheriff
- The Kid from Arizona (1931) as Marshal Jack
- The Mystery Trooper (1931) as Mountie (uncredited)
- The Sign of the Wolf (1931) as Jack (uncredited)
- 45 Calibre Echo (1932) as Jack
- Between Fighting Men (1932) as Pete the Henchman
- Dynamite Ranch (1932) as Jack the Henchman
- Movie Crazy (1932) as Man in Screening Room (uncredited)
- Hell Fire Austin (1932) as Curley the Henchman
- Jaws of Justice (1933) as Sergeant Kinkaid
- The Mystery Squadron (1933) as Roberts the Mystery Flyer
- The Whispering Shadow (1933) as Williams the Henchman (uncredited)
- The Big Race (1934) as Riley
- Rawhide Mail (1934) as Jack Reed
- Mystery Ranch (1934) as George Andrews
- Arizona Nights (Short) (1934) as Bud Regan
- Rainbow Riders (Short) (1934) as Bud Regan
- Girl Trouble (Short) (1934) as Bud Adams
- The Cactus Kid (1935) as Jack Durant
- Loser's End (1935) as Jack
- North of Arizona (1935) as Jack Loomis
- Wolf Riders (1935) as Jack Jennings
- Texas Jack (1935) Texas Jack Carrol
- Wildcat Saunders (1936) as Wildcat Saunders
- Desert Justice (1936) as Jack Rankin
- Hair-Trigger Casey (1936) as Captain Frank Hair-Trigger Casey
- Gun Grit (1936) as Bob Blake
- Arizona Mahoney (1936) as Stevens the Henchman (uncredited)
- Go West Young Man (1936) as Cop (uncredited)
- The Accusing Finger (1936) as Guard (uncredited)
- Reckless Ranger (1937) as Chet Newton
- San Quentin (1937) as Hank (uncredited)
- The Painted Stallion (1937) as Davy Crockett
- The Last Train from Madrid (1937) as Guard (uncredited)
- The Wrong Road (1937) as Policeman (uncredited)
- The 13th Man (1937) as Policeman (uncredited)
- Young Dynamite (1937) as Trooper at Map (uncredited)
- Wells Fargo (1937) as Scout (uncredited)
- The Mysterious Pilot (1937) as Thompson (uncredited)
- The Trigger Trio (1937) as Henchman (uncredited)
- The Purple Vigilantes (1938) as Duncan
- The Pal from Texas (1939) as Sheriff
- West of Pinto Basin (1940) as Ware
- Under Age (1941) as Grant
- Alfred Hitchcock Presents (1957) (Season 3 Episode 13: "Night of the Execution") as Man Exiting Courtroom
