= The Four-Bit Man =

1919 film

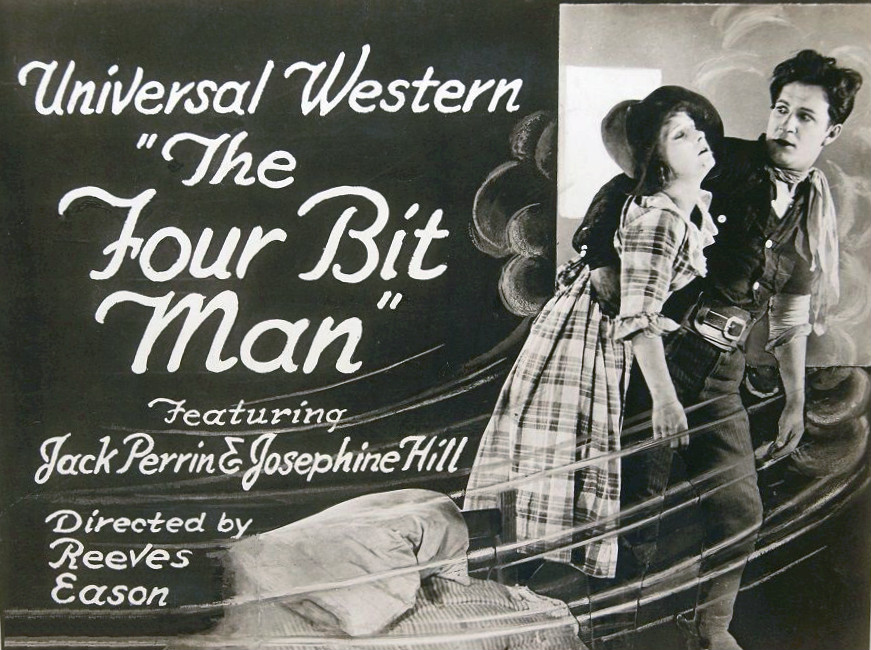
- Lobby card
- Directed by: B. Reeves Eason
- Written by: Anthony Coldeway; Eric Howard; Judith Howard
- Starring: Josephine Hill
- Distributed by: Universal Film Manufacturing Company
- Release date: August 21, 1919
- Running time: 20 minutes
- Country: United States
- Languages: Silent; English intertitles

The Four-Bit Man is a 1919 American short silent Western film directed by B. Reeves Eason.

== Plot ==
According to the copyright description, "Dick Ramsey, cowpuncher, finds himself with a four-bit piece as his worldly capital. As he rides along, Nellie Rhodes, daughter of Dusty Rhodes, the sheriff of Angels Camp, drives the family cow to pasture. Nellie, in her father’s opinion, will flirt with every man she sees. Nellie and her cow have an argument and, Dick, coming to her rescue, finds himself in the throes of a violent flirtation. Dick arrives at Angels Camp and is pointed out to the sheriff as the latest of Nellie’s admirers. Dick plays his last four-bits and loses. He starts an argument and the sheriff seizes the opportunity to arrest him. The sheriff decides to cure Nellie. He persuades his nephew Joe to kidnap her. Dick, from his prison window, sees the struggling girl. He gets out, commandeers a horse and starts in pursuit. He overtakes them and beats Joe up, but Joe wounds him before he escapes. Joe rides back to town and tells the sheriff. They start out to find Dick.

Dick and Nellie come back to Buck McGinley’s deserted log cabin. Nellie goes to the creek for water and is seen by the sheriff. She tells her father that Dick escaped. Nellie and the sheriff are over taken by Mary, who tells them that the hills are on fire and “it’s pretty near to Buck McGinley’s log cabin.” Nellie realizes that Dick is lying in the cabin, wounded. The sheriff orders her to go back to town for help, while he and Mary start out for the fire, but Nellie starts on a round-about road for the cabin. Dick is not badly wounded, as Nellie supposed, and has gone out to help. The sheriff and Mary arrive just as Nellie, from an opposite direction, rushes in and finds her looking for him. He drags her out and staggers over to the sheriff with Nellie. Nellie’s eyes open and smile up at Dick, who says to her: “I lost my last four-bits on a crooked wheel. If I’d won, I could have bought a license.” The sheriff smiles and says: “Don’t worry, son, I’ll buy you a license and give you a job, too. You are the new deputy sheriff.”

== Cast ==
- Josephine Hill as Nellie Rhodes
- Andrew Waldron as Deputy Sheriff Bill Scroggs
- William Dyer as Deputy Sheriff Bill Scroggs
- Hoot Gibson as Joe
- Jack Perrin as Dick Ramsey

== See also ==
- List of American films of 1919
- Hoot Gibson filmography
