= Hugh Thompson (American actor) =

American actor (born 1887)

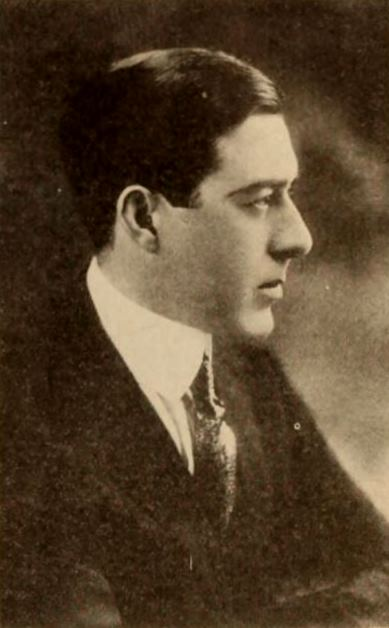
- Born: May 20, 1887; St. Louis, Missouri, U.S.
- Occupation: Actor
- Years active: 1915–1926
- Spouse(s): Virginia S. Glyndon (1909–?, divorced)

Hugh Thompson (born May 20, 1887) was an American actor of the silent film era. He appeared in over 50 feature films and film shorts during the 1910s and 1920s. Some of his more prominent roles were in 1917's Barnaby Lee, 1918's Queen of the Sea and The Forbidden Path, The Woman Under Oath in 1920, and 1922's The Half Breed. His final role was in a supporting role in the 1926 film, The Highbinders.

== Partial filmography ==
- The Raven (1915)
- Sherlock Holmes (1916)
- Little Miss Fortune (1917)
- Queen X (1917)
- Barnaby Lee (1917)
- The Soul of Buddha (1918)
- The House of Gold (1918)
- Ashes of Love (1918)
- Queen of the Sea (1918)
- Secret Strings (1918)
- Phil for Short (1919)
- The Woman Under Oath (1919)
- Home Wanted (1919)
- The Slim Princess (1920)
- What Happened to Rosa (1920)
- The Half Breed (1922)
- Head over Heels (1922)
- The Altar Stairs (1922)
- The Grub-Stake (1923)
- Refuge (1923)
- Meddling Women (1924)
- The Highbinders (1926)
