= Sentimental Tommy =

1921 film by John S. Robertson

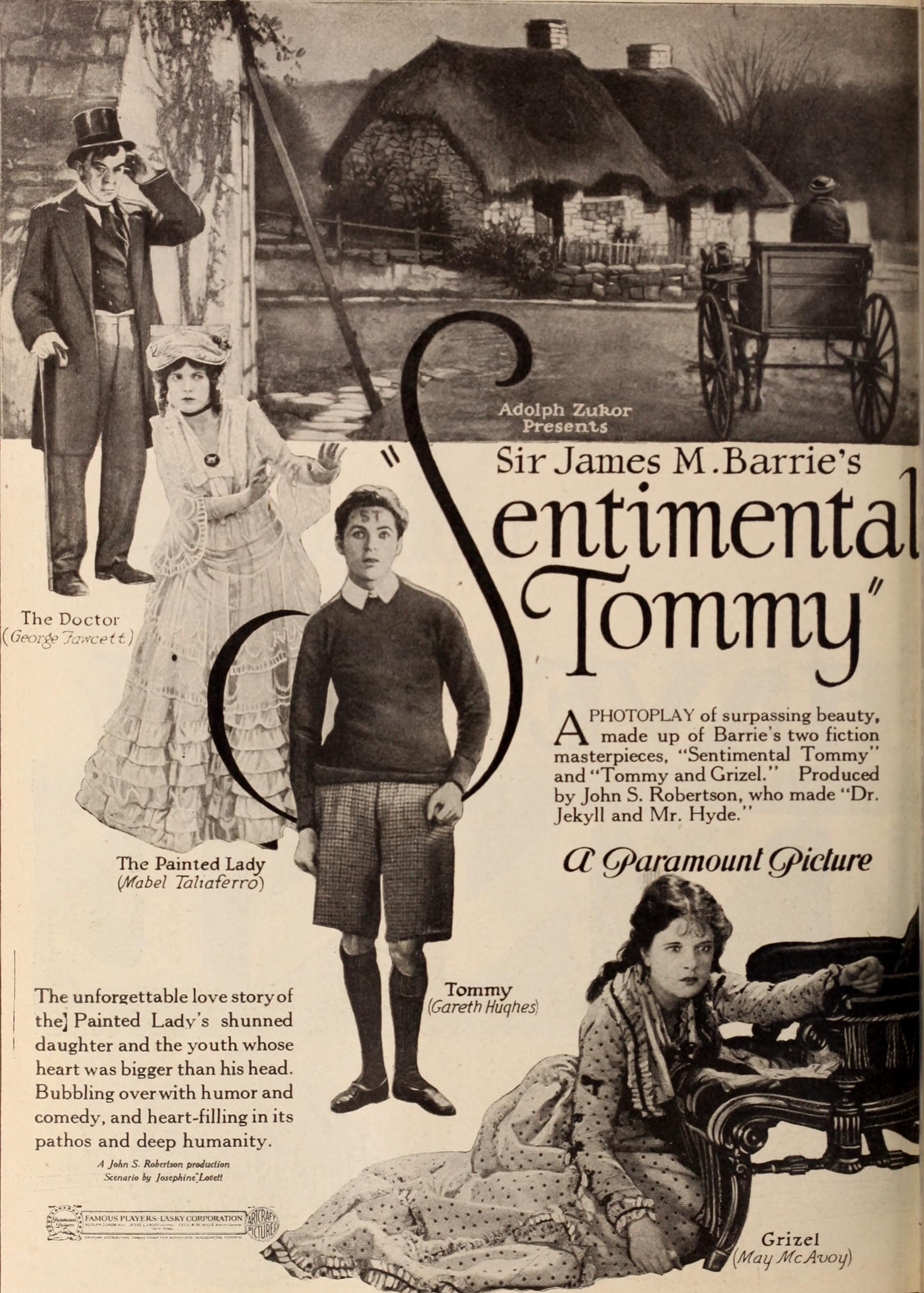
- Advertisement
- Directed by: John S. Robertson
- Written by: Josephine Lovett (scenario)
- Based on: Sentimental Tommy by James M. Barrie
- Produced by: Famous Players–Lasky
- Starring: Gareth Hughes; May McAvoy; George Fawcett; Mabel Taliaferro
- Cinematography: Roy Overbaugh
- Distributed by: Paramount Pictures
- Release date: May 29, 1921 (U.S.)
- Running time: 75+ minutes at 8 reels (7,575 ft)
- Country: United States
- Language: Silent (English intertitles)

Sentimental Tommy is a 1921 lost American silent drama film directed by John S. Robertson and based on the novels Sentimental Tommy and Tommy and Grizel by J. M. Barrie. The film served as a star vehicle for actor Gareth Hughes; early versions of the film featured Mary Astor but her scenes were removed before release.

== Plot ==
Though the film is considered lost, much of the plot can still be gleaned from various film publications released at the same time as the movie, along with the contents of the novels themselves.

Grizel constantly experiences tragedies from a young age. She is ostracized by all the children of the town. Her mother, The Painted Lady, dies, leading to Dr. Gemmell making her his housekeeper. Her luck seems to turn up when Tommy Sandys and his sister come to town. Tommy is very friendly towards her, however Grizel still keeps her distance.

Many years pass, and Tommy is now a famous London author. He visits the town of his youth once again, and finds Grizel heartbroken because of the loss of the doctor. Tommy tries deciding for himself whether he loves Grizel - but he can't decide. So, he returns to London. With his absence, Grizel goes insane from heartbreak. Tommy, finally deciding he loves her, returns to Grizel. They marry, but Tommy fears that once Grizel is cured she will no longer love him. Over two years, Tommy slowly helps her - until finally she is cured. Tommy tells her that he cared for her out of his love for her. This pleases Grizel, and for the first time in many years she is happy.

== Cast ==
- Gareth Hughes as Tommy Sandys
- Malcolm Bradley as Domino Cathro
- Harry Coleman as Cpl. Shiach
- Kate Davenport as Gavinia
- George Fawcett as Dr. McQueen
- Leila Frost as Elspeth Sandys
- Kempton Greene as Dr. David Gemmell
- Alfred Kappeler as The Little Minister
- May McAvoy as Grizel
- Mabel Taliaferro as The Painted Lady
- Virginia Valli as Lady Alice Pippinworth
- Mary Astor (scenes deleted)

== Reception ==
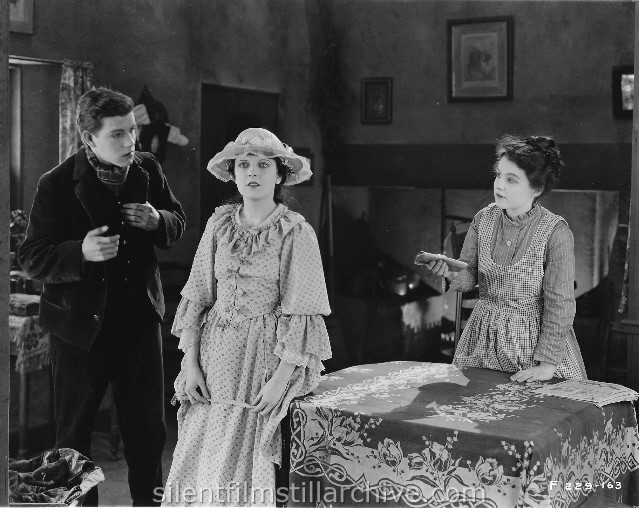
Sentimental Tommy: L-R Gareth Hughes, Mae McAvoy, Leila Frost

I fear it is quite useless to tell anybody who did not see Sentimental Tommy how good May McAvoy was. I can only say that Grizel was the most moving revelation of the gifts of a fresh and hitherto unknown young actress that I have ever encountered…Beauty and pity were the great elements in it, and all seemed to well up as it were spontaneously from the depths of an inexhaustible sensibility. — Literary critic and film historian Edward Wagenknecht.

The film received mixed reviews upon its release on May 29, 1921. The Minneapolis Morning Tribune expressed admiration for the film's acting, calling out director John S. Robertson for this "very fine film". It noted in particular the film's handling of emotion. The review also remarked that Gareth Hughes, a popular Welsh actor, was a big hit with the fans.

According to The Philadelphia Inquirer: "There is the tender, elusive quality, the charm and the pathos, the humor, the quality which could bring one to tears while smiling". The reviewer called the depiction of Tommy growing from child to man as "simply spectacular". Variety stated that it must have been "a great pleasure" to record a movie that is so fine and expresses admiration the translation of the book to screen. The reviewer notes that Tommy is a "profound character in this film particular", and praises the film's direction. People were infatuated with the actor behind Tommy's character, Gareth Hughes, and believed that he well portrayed the Tommy people knew and loved in the novel.

The Christian Science Monitor stated the film "respects its original novel that was printed years prior to the movie". The author of the article states how Tommy's story is told with "numerous titles but, happily, they are written by someone with an active intelligence". The reviewer likened the film to The Four Horsemen of the Apocalypse, The Ole Swimming Hole and Thrums of Long Island.

Robert E. Sherwood from Life magazine reviewed Sentimental Tommy with a list of pros and cons. He mentioned that the director, John S. Robertson, displayed a "commendable degree of good taste throughout". This "perfect interpretation" of the novel led him to say that he was surprised how well the film turned out, considering the unusual settings in the novel. The one thing that bothered Sherwood was that the film was "far too long".

Negative reviews included one that ran in The Minneapolis Morning Tribune, where the headline read: "Reviewer calls happy ending only real weakness of screen version". Life expressed dissatisfaction with the top ten movies of 1921, Sentimental Tommy among them, suggesting that an unwritten law has landed these "trendy movies" at the top.
