= John Tansey =

American actor

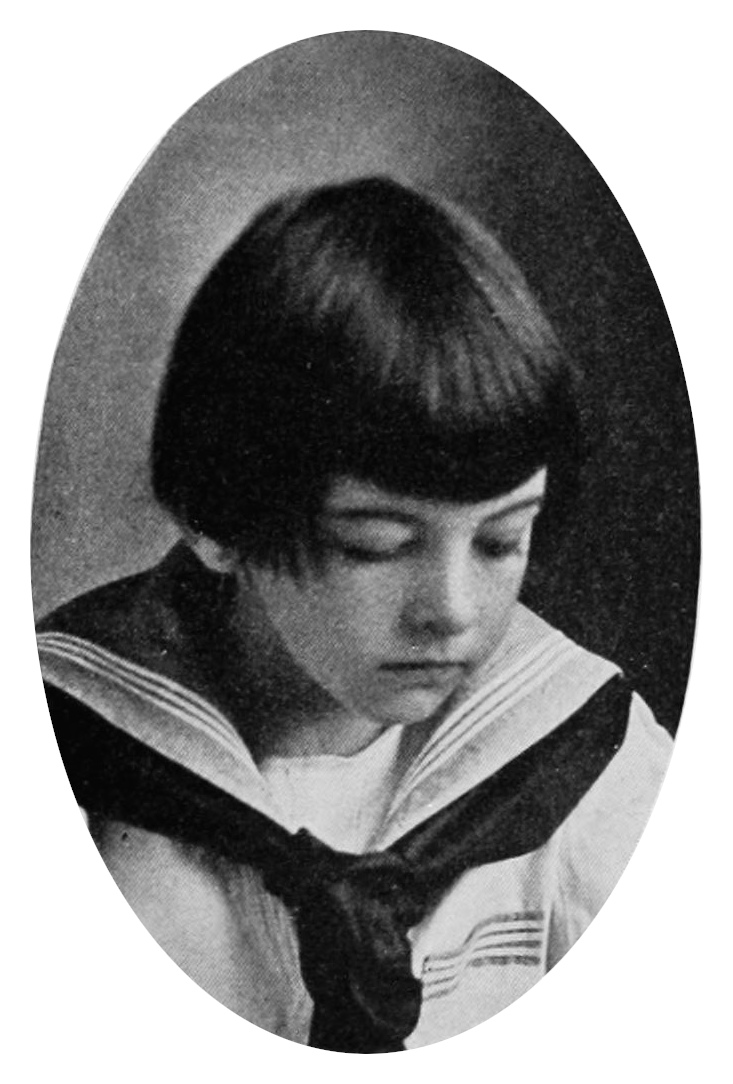
John Tansey as a child actor

John Tansey (8 October 1901 – 28 April 1971) was an American actor. He appeared in 21 films from 1908 to 1932.

His first appearance was in The Red Man and the Child (1908). He wrote and directed the films Wild and Wooly in 1924 and Romance of the West in 1930.

He was born in New York City and died in Hollywood, California. His mother was actress Emma Tansey and his brothers were Robert Emmett "Bob" Tansey and James Sheridan Tansey. He had a cousin also named John Tansey who was born in Hebden Bridge, West Yorkshire.

== Selected filmography ==
- And a Little Child Shall Lead Them (1909)
- A Trap for Santa (1909)
- Barnaby Lee (1917)
- Little Miss Hoover (1918)(*uncredited)
- The Heart of a Girl (1918)
- Trouping with Ellen (1924)
- The Sky Rider (1928)
- Romance of the West (1930)
- Riders of the Rio (1931)

== Bibliography ==
- John Holmstrom, The Moving Picture Boy: An International Encyclopaedia from 1895 to 1995, Norwich, Michael Russell, 1996, pp. 19–20.
