= Daring Danger (1922 film) =

1922 film

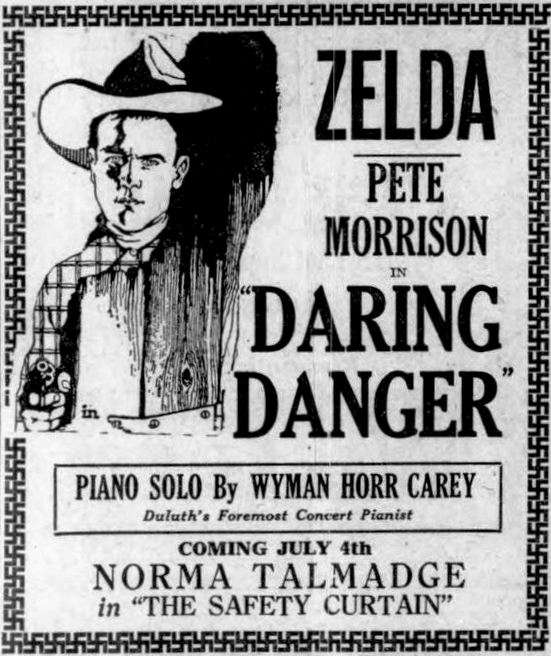
- Directed by: Clifford Smith
- Written by: L.V. Jefferson
- Produced by: Clifford Smith
- Starring: Pete Morrison; Esther Ralston; Lew Meehan
- Production company: Cliff Smith Productions
- Distributed by: American Releasing Corporation; Associated Photoplays
- Release date: March 5, 1922
- Running time: 50 minutes
- Country: United States
- Languages: Silent; English intertitles

Daring Danger is a 1922 American silent Western film directed by Clifford Smith and starring Pete Morrison, Esther Ralston and Lew Meehan.

== Cast ==
- Pete Morrison as Cal Horton
- Esther Ralston as Ethel Stanton
- William Ryno as Bill Stanton
- Lew Meehan as Steve Harris
- Bob Fleming as Bull Weaver

== Preservation ==
With no holdings located in archives, Daring Danger is now considered a lost film.

== Bibliography ==
- Connelly, Robert B. The Silents: Silent Feature Films, 1910-36, Volume 40, Issue 2. December Press, 1998.
- Munden, Kenneth White. The American Film Institute Catalog of Motion Pictures Produced in the United States, Part 1. University of California Press, 1997.
