= The Fighting Heart (1919 film) =

1919 film

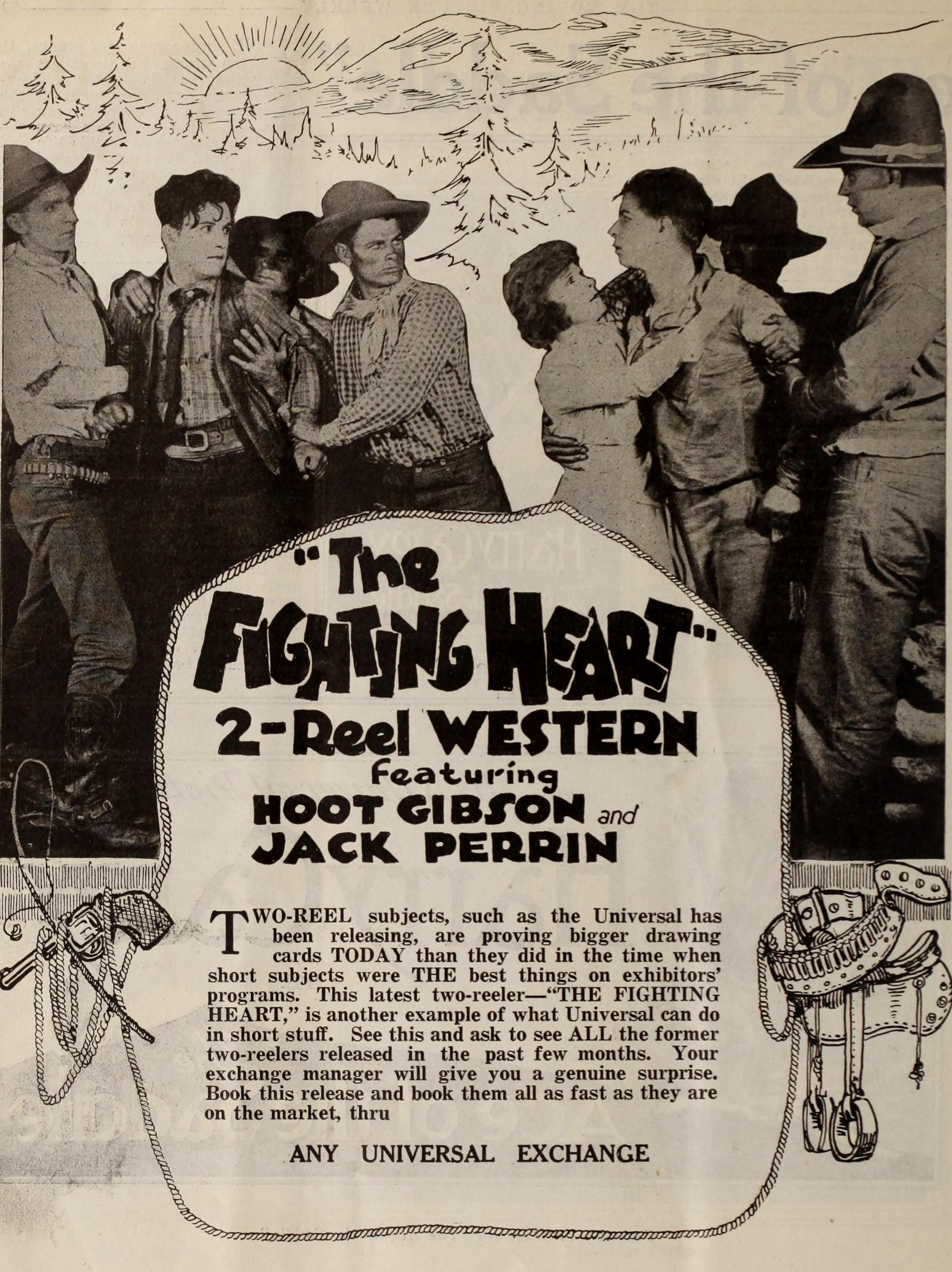
- Directed by: B. Reeves Eason
- Written by: Anthony Coldeway; William Pigott
- Starring: Jack Perrin
- Distributed by: Universal Film Manufacturing Company
- Release date: August 16, 1919
- Running time: 20 minutes
- Country: United States
- Languages: Silent; English intertitles

The Fighting Heart is a 1919 American short silent Western film directed by B. Reeves Eason.

== Plot ==
According to a film magazine, "Jim, owner of the Circle W, and his brother Edgar were in love with the district school teacher. Jim was a man of few words, but admired and respected by all. He was not over particular regarding his personal appearance, but held honor above all else.

Edgar, who prided himself in his neat appearance, strength and ability, found a successful road to the school teacher's heart. He proposed and was accepted. That same afternoon Jim, in his crude way, told the school teacher of his love. When he learned that she was his brother's, his only remark was: "Edgar will justify your highest expectations."

Upon returning to the ranch, Jim finds Edgar taking one of the ranch hands to task. The big roughneck cowpuncher sneers at Edgar's orders. Edgar is furious and although big enough to thrash him seems to be afraid. Jim steps in, administers a thrashing, and then asks Edgar where his fighting blood has gone. At an entertainment at the school, the audience is held up by a masked bandit. The school teacher is robbed of her ring and Jim and Edgar are sent in pursuit of the bandit. Edgar again displays fear, falls and is injured. Jim, although shot in the arm, captures the robber. The brothers return and Edgar returns the ring to his fiancee, who chanced to overhear the robber remark that it was fortunate that Edgar didn't set out alone after him.

Jim, determined to bring out the fighting blood in his brother, with the aid of the teacher, stages a kidnapping. Jim becomes the "culprit" and steals his brother's sweetheart, and is seen by her sister, who rushes madly to inform Edgar. Jim is "captured" in a deserted house. A terrific fight between the two brothers ends in Edgar learning that his brother has been striving to make him a bigger man and that the school teacher really loves someone else. Jim, at last, realizes this same fact."

== Cast ==
- Jack Perrin as Jim Wilson
- Hoot Gibson as Edgar Wilson
- Josephine Hill as Mary Sinton
- William Pathe
- Magda Lane
- Laura Trainor as Lucy Sinton
- Leo Pattee as Steve Loury

== See also ==
- List of American films of 1919
