= West of Cheyenne (1931 film) =

1931 film

- Directed by: Harry S. Webb
- Written by: Bennett Cohen; Oliver Drake
- Produced by: Harry S. Webb
- Starring: Tom Tyler; Josephine Hill; Harry Woods
- Cinematography: William Nobles
- Edited by: Carl Himm
- Production company: Harry Webb Productions
- Distributed by: Syndicate Pictures
- Release date: March 1, 1931
- Running time: 56 minutes
- Country: United States
- Language: English

West of Cheyenne is a 1931 American pre-Code Western film directed by Harry S. Webb and starring Tom Tyler, Josephine Hill and Harry Woods.

== Cast ==
- Tom Tyler as Tom Langdon
- Josephine Hill as Bess
- Harry Woods as Kurt Raymer, aka The Laramie Kid
- Fern Emmett as Rose
- Ben Corbett as Banty
- Lafe McKee as Lafe Langdon
- Robert D. Walker as Henchman Nevada
- Lew Meehan as Henchman
- Tex Palmer as Langdon Cowhand
- Slim Whitaker as Henchman Steve

== Plot ==
Langdon tracks down the outlaw gang that murdered his father.

== Bibliography ==
- Pitts, Michael R. Western Movies: A Guide to 5,105 Feature Films. McFarland, 2012.
