= Josephine Hill =

American actress (1899–1989)

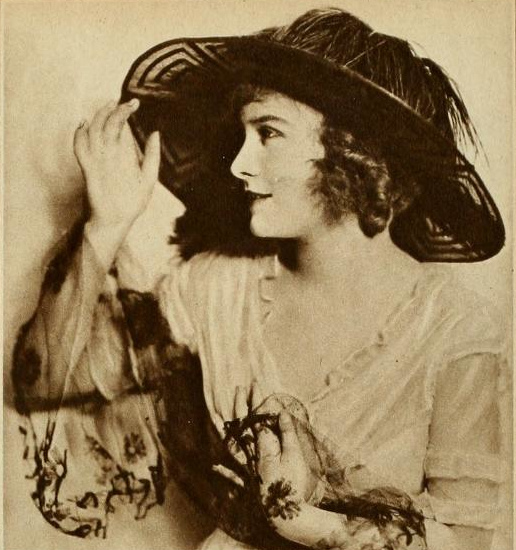
- Hill in 1920
- Born: Malvina Josephine Hill; October 3, 1899; San Francisco, California, U.S.
- Died: December 17, 1989 (aged 90); Palm Springs, California, U.S.
- Resting place: Desert Memorial Park, Cathedral City, California
- Other names: Josephine Perrin, Josephine Hill Brown
- Occupation: Actress
- Years active: 1917–1933
- Spouse(s): Jack Perrin; Jack Valentine Brown

Malvina Josephine Hill Brown (October 3, 1899 – December 17, 1989) was an American film actress, primarily during the silent era. She appeared in more than 100 films between 1917 and 1933.

== Early life ==
Hill was born in San Francisco, the daughter of C. L. Hill and Kate E. Schmidt Hill. Before she worked in films, Hill performed in Gus Edwards's School Days vaudeville act. Her parents' divorce in 1916 included negotiations about her stage income.

== Career ==
Hill made more than a hundred films, most of the silent Westerns, starting with The Voice on the Wire in 1917. After her last picture in 1932, she worked in the wardrobe department of a film studio.

== Personal life ==
Hill's marriage to Western star Jack Perrin was announced in 1920; they divorced in 1937. Hill married Spanish-born electrician Joaquin Valentine Barrena in 1940; he changed his named to "Jack Valentine Brown" when he was naturalized in 1942. Hill died in Palm Springs, California. She is buried at Desert Memorial Park in Cathedral City, California with a gravestone marked "Josephine Hill Brown".

== Selected filmography ==
- The Voice on the Wire (1917)
- The Fighting Heart (1919)
- The Four-Bit Man (1919)
- The Jack of Hearts (1919)
- The Face in the Watch (1919)
- The Tell Tale Wire (1919)
- The Lone Hand (1919)
- The Double Hold-Up (1919)
- The Jay Bird (1920)
- West Is Best (1920)
- The Sheriff's Oath (1920)
- Parlor, Bedroom and Bath (1920)
- Burnt Wings (1920)
- The Man Trackers (1921)
- Night Life in Hollywood (1922)
- Lone Fighter (1923)
- Winning a Woman (1925)
- Josselyn's Wife (1926)
- The High Hand (1926)
- The Man from Oklahoma (1926)
- The Blind Trail (1926)
- Two-Gun of the Tumbleweed (1927)
- Heroes of the Wild (1927)
- The Sky Rider (1928)
- Silent Sentinel (1929)
- The Kid from Arizona (1931)
- Wild West Whoopee (1931)
- West of Cheyenne (1931)
- The Lone Trail (1932)
