= Henry Roquemore =

American character actor (1886–1943)

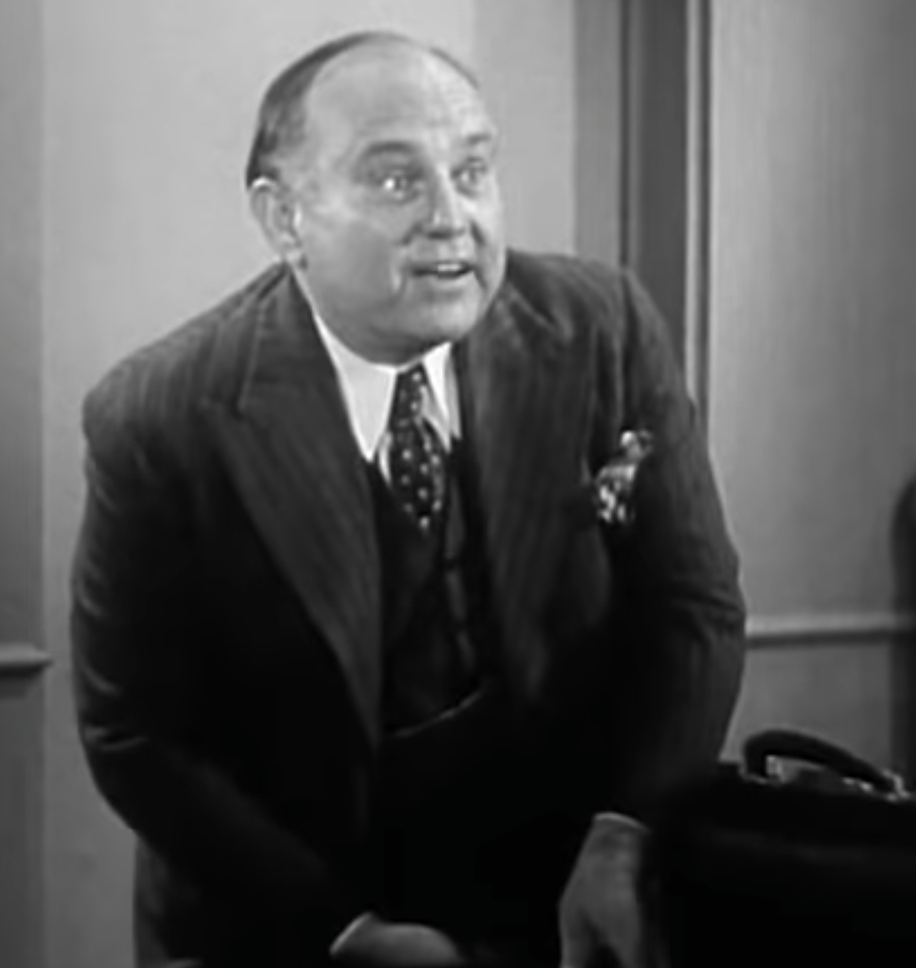
- Roquemore in Midnight Phantom (1935)
- Born: March 18, 1886; Marshall, Texas, U.S.
- Died: June 30, 1943 (aged 57); Beverly Hills, California, U.S.
- Resting place: Forest Lawn Memorial Park, Glendale, California
- Other names: Henry Rocquemore
- Occupation: Character actor
- Years active: 1925–1943
- Spouse(s): Fern Emmett (m. 19??)

Henry Roquemore (March 18, 1886 – June 30, 1943) was an American character actor who primarily played bit parts. He appeared in 229 silent and sound films from 1927 until 1943. Many of his roles were uncredited parts in Western movies, but he also appeared in major films including Meet John Doe, The Little Foxes, The Magnificent Ambersons, and Yours for the Asking starring George Raft and Ida Lupino. He was sometimes credited as Henry Rocquemore.

== Career ==
Born in Marshall, Texas, Roquemore began his career in entertainment by staging local talent shows, for clubs in his hometown of Marshall, Texas. His first role in Hollywood was the Beast in the 1927 silent film Is Your Daughter Safe? and his last was in 1943's Girl Crazy. After the making of first sound film in 1927, he specialized in his fat man roles and was widely sought out by directors, such as Frank Capra and Orson Welles for bit parts; exemplified by the Match King one of Mae West's suitors in 1935's Goin' to Town. His more famous roles include; Jouett Goforth in 1931's Cimarron and in 1941's Woman of the Year as the Justice of the Peace who married Katharine Hepburn and Spencer Tracy.

== Personal life and death ==
Roquemore was married to actress Fern Emmett. He died from a heart attack on June 30, 1943, in Beverly Hills, California, and was interred in the Forest Lawn Memorial Park Cemetery in Glendale, California.

== Partial filmography ==
- The Windjammer (1926)
- Is Your Daughter Safe? (1927)
- The Fighting Three (1927)
- For Ladies Only (1927)
- Gypsy of the North (1928)
- The City of Purple Dreams (1928)
- Stocks and Blondes (1928)
- The Branded Man (1928)
- The Law and the Man (1928)
- Anne Against the World (1929)
- The Oklahoma Kid (1929)
- Beyond the Rio Grande (1930)
- Romance of the West (1930)
- Westward Bound (1930)
- Second Honeymoon (1930)
- The Kid from Arizona (1931)
- Wild West Whoopee (1931)
- The Cheyenne Cyclone (1931)
- Son of Oklahoma (1932)
- Young Blood (1932)
- The Fighting Champ (1932)
- Easy Millions (1933)
- Breed of the Border (1933)
- City Limits (1934)
- Texas Terror (1935)
- Rainbow's End (1935)
- The Live Wire (1935)
- Midnight Phantom (1935)
- On Probation (1935)
- Hearts in Bondage (1936)
- Bank Alarm (1937)
- Thanks for Listening (1937)
- Assassin of Youth (1937)
- Goodbye Broadway (1938)
- Songs and Saddles (1938)
- Barefoot Boy (1938)
- No Greater Sin (1941)
