= Broncho Billy Anderson filmography =

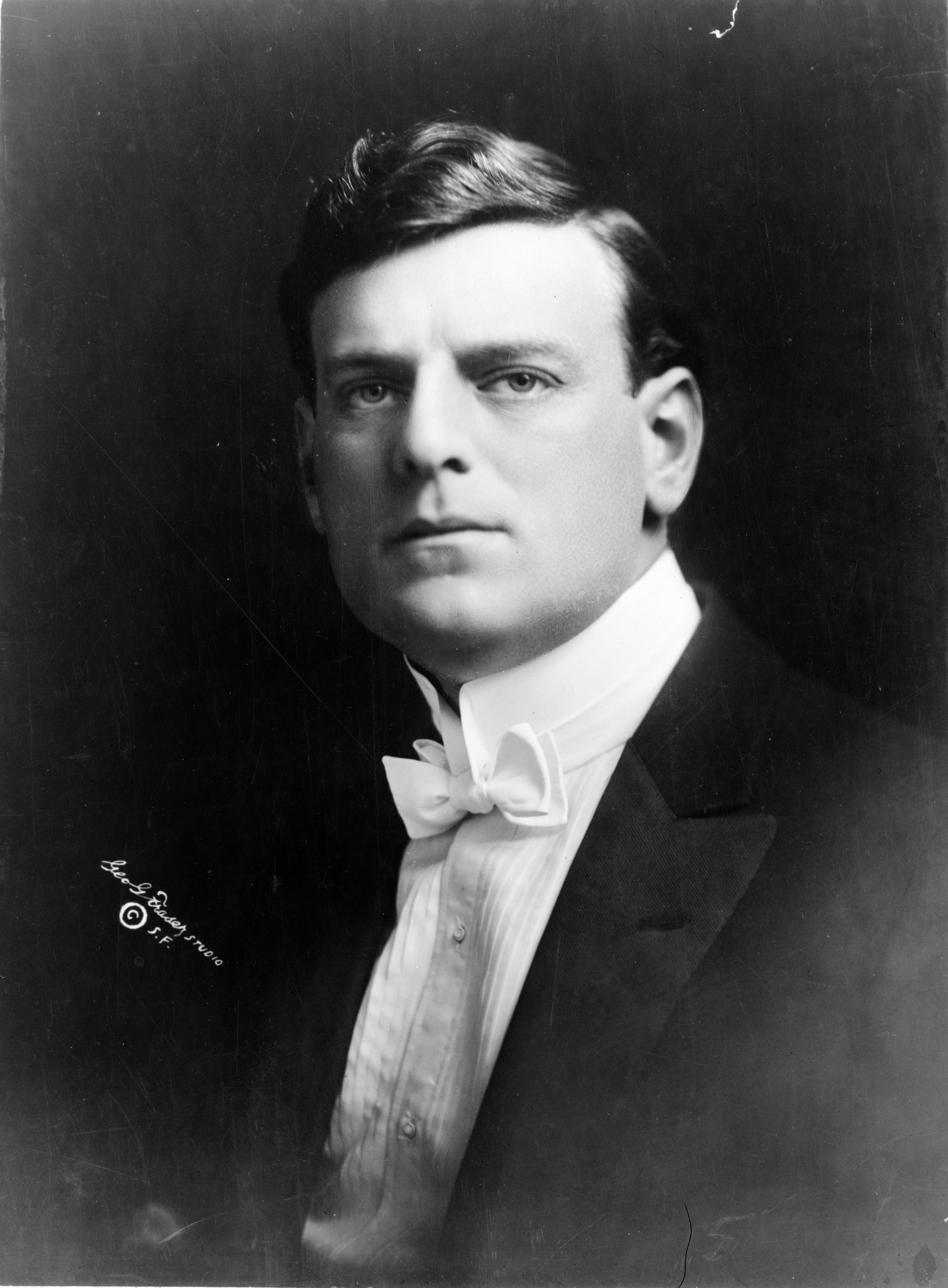
Anderson c. 1913

These are the appearances as an actor of Gilbert M. Anderson aka "Broncho Billy" Anderson

== Early years ==
Year	Title	Role
1903	The Great Train Robbery	Bandit / Shot Passenger / Tenderfoot Dancer
1903	The Messenger Boy's Mistake	Messenger Boy
1903	What Happened in the Tunnel	Uncredited
1904	A Brush Between Cowboys and Indians	Uncredited
1904	Western Stage Coach Hold Up	Uncredited
1905	Adventures of Sherlock Holmes	Sherlock Holmes
1905	The Train Wreckers	Last Train Wrecker
1906	The Female Highwayman	Uncredited; Director)
1906	Who’s Who	Uncredited (Director)
1906	Dolly's Papa	Uncredited (Director)
1906	Lights of a Great City	Uncredited (Director)
1906	Life of an American Cowboy	Uncredited (Producer, Writer)
1907	An Awful Skate	Director, producer, writer)
1907	The Bandit King	Uncredited (Director)
1907	Western Justice	Uncredited (Director)
1908	The Bandit Makes Good	Uncredited (Director)
1908	The Baseball Fan	Uncredited (Director, Writer)

== 1909 ==
- Shanghaied (Mar 3)
- The Road Agents (Mar 17)
- A Tale of the West (Apr 7)
- A Mexican's Gratitude (May 5)
- Mr. Flip (May 12) (Directed)
- The Indian Trailer (May 19)
- Black Sheep (Jul 7)
- A Maid of the Mountains (Aug. 11)
- The Best Man Wins (Nov 20)
- Judgment (Nov 27)
- His Reformation (Dec 4)
- The Ranchman's Rival (Dec 11)
- The Spanish Girl (Dec 18)
- The Heart of a Cowboy (Dec. 25)

== 1910 ==
- A Western Maid (Jan 1)
- An Outlaw's Sacrifice (Jan 29)
- Western Chivalry (Feb 12)
- The Cowboy and the Squaw (Feb 19)
- The Mexican's Faith (Feb 26)
- The Ranch Girl's Legacy (Mar 5)
- The Fence at Bar Z Ranch (Mar 12)
- The Girl and the Fugitive (Mar 19)
- The Flower of the Ranch (Apr 2)
- The Ranger's Bride (Apr 9)
- The Mistaken Bandit (Apr 16)
- The Cowboy's Sweetheart (Apr 23)
- A Vein of Gold (Apr 30)
- The Sheriff's Sacrifice (May 7)
- The Cowpuncher's Ward (May 14)
- The Brother, the Sister and the Cowpuncher (May 28)
- Away Out West (Jun 4)
- The Ranchmen's Feud or The Ranchman's Feud (Jun 11)
- The Bandit's Wife (Jun 18)
- The Forest Ranger (Jun 25)
- The Bad Man's Last Deed (Jul 2)
- The Unknown Claim (Jul 9)
- Trailed to the West (or Trailed to the Hills?) (Jul 16)
- The Desperado (Jul 23)
- Broncho Billy's Redemption (Jul 30)
- Under Western Skies (Aug 6)
- The Girl on Triple X Ranch (Aug 13)
- The Dumb Half Breed's Defense (Aug 20)
- The Deputy's Love (Aug 27)
- The Millionaire and the Ranch Girl (Sep 3)
- An Indian Girl's Love (Sep 10)
- The Pony Express Rider (Sep 17)
- Patricia of the Plains (Oct 1)
- The Bearded Bandit (Oct 8)
- Pals of the Range (Oct 22)
- The Silent Message (Oct 29)
- A Westerner's Way (Nov 5)
- The Marked Trail (Nov 12)
- A Western Woman's Way (Nov 26)
- Circle C Ranch Wedding Present (Dec 3)
- A Cowboy's Vindication (Dec 10)
- The Tenderfoot Messenger (Dec 17)
- The Bad Man's Christmas Gift (Dec 24)
- A Gambler of the West (Dec 31)

== 1911 ==
- The Count and the Cowboys (Jan 7)
- The Girl of the West (Jan 14)
- The Border Ranger (Jan 21)
- The Two Reformations (Jan 28)
- Carmenita, the Faithful (Feb 4)
- Bad Man's Downfall (Feb 11)
- The Cattleman's Daughter (Feb 18)
- The Outlaw and the Child (Feb 25)
- On the Desert's Edge (Mar 4)
- The Romance on Bar Q Ranch or The Romance on 'Bar O' (Mar 11)
- A Thwarted Vengeance (Mar 25)
- Across the Plains (Apr 1)
- The Sheriff's Chum (Apr 8)
- The Bad Man's First Prayer (Apr 15)
- The Indian Maiden's Lesson (Apr 22)
- The Puncher's New Love (May 13)
- The Lucky Card (May 27)
- Forgiven in Death (Jun 10)
- The Tribe's Penalty (Jun 17)
- The Hidden Mine (Jun 24)
- The Sheriff's Brother (Jul 1)
- At the Break of Dawn (Jul 7)
- The Corporation and the Ranch Girl (Jul 8)
- The Outlaw Samaritan (Jul 22)
- The Two Fugitives (Jul 29)
- The Two-Gun Man (Aug 5)
- A Pal's Oath (Aug 19)
- Spike Shannon's Last Fight (Aug 26)
- What a Woman Can Do (Apr 29)
- A Western Girl's Sacrifice (Sep 2)
- Broncho Billy's Last Spree or Broncho Bill's Last Spree (Sep 9)
- The Cowpuncher's Law or The Puncher's Law (Sep 14)
- The Millionaire and the Squatter (Sep 16)
- The Sheriff (Sep 16?)
- An Indian's Sacrifice (Sep 23)
- The Power of Good (Sep 28)
- The Sheriff's Decision (Oct 6)
- The Stage Driver's Daughter (Oct 14)
- The Cowboy's Mother-in-Law (Oct 15)
- A Western Redemption (Oct 21)
- The Forester's Plea (Oct 28)
- The Outlaw Deputy (Nov 4)
- The Girl Back East (Nov 11)
- The Cattle Rustler's Father (Nov 18)
- The Desert Claim (Nov 25)
- The Mountain Law (Dec 2)
- A Frontier Doctor (Dec 9)
- The Cowboy Coward (Dec 16)
- Broncho Billy's Christmas Dinner (Dec 23)
- Broncho Billy's Adventure (Dec 30)

== 1912 ==
- Child of the West (Jan 6)
- The Tenderfoot Foreman (Jan 11)
- The Sheepman's Escape (Jan 13)
- The Oath of His Office (Jan 27)
- Broncho Billy and the Schoolmistress (Feb 3)
- The Deputy and the Girl (Feb 10)
- The Prospector's Legacy (Feb 17)
- The Ranch Girl's Mistake (Mar 2)
- The Bandit's Child (Mar 16)
- The Deputy's Love Affair (Mar 23)
- Alkali Bests Broncho Billy (Mar 26)
- An Arizona Escapade (Mar 30)
- A Road Agent's Love (Apr 6)
- Broncho Billy and the Girl (Apr 9)
- Under Mexican Skies (Apr 13)
- The Cattle King's Daughter (Apr 20)
- The Indian and the Child (Apr 27)
- Broncho Billy and the Bandits (May 4)
- The Dead Man's Claim (May 11)
- A Western Legacy (May 21)
- The Desert Sweetheart (May 25)
- Broncho Billy's Bible (Jun 1; re-released Feb 28, 1914)
- On El Monte Ranch (Jun 4)
- A Child of the Purple Sage (Jun 8)
- Western Hearts (Jun 15)
- Broncho Billy's Gratitude (Jun 18)
- The Foreman's Cousin (Jun 22)
- Broncho Billy and the Indian Maid (Jun 29)
- On the Cactus 'Trail (Jul 2)
- Broncho Billy's Narrow Escape (Jul 6)
- A Story of Montana (Jul 13)
- The Smuggler's Daughter (Jul 16)
- A Wife of the Hills (Jul 20)
- A Moonshiner's Heart (Jul 27)
- Broncho Billy's Pal (Jul 30)
- The Little Sheriff (Aug 10)
- Broncho Billy's Last HoldUp (Aug 13)
- On the Moonlight Trail (Aug 17)
- Broncho Billy's Escapade (Aug 24)
- Broncho Billy for Sheriff (Aug 31)
- The Ranchman's Trust (Sep 7)
- Broncho Billy Outwitted (Sep 14)
- An Indian Sunbeam (Sep 28)
- Love on Tough Luck Ranch (Oct 5)
- The Shotgun Ranchman (Oct 12)
- The Tomboy on Bar Z (Oct 22)
- The Ranch Girl's Trial (Oct 26)
- The Mother of the Ranch (Nov 2)
- An Indian's Friendship (Nov 9)
- The Dance at Silver Gulch (Nov 19)
- Broncho Billy's Heart (Nov 23)
- The Boss of the Katy Mine (Nov 28)
- Broncho Billy's Mexican Wife (Nov 30)
- Western Girls (Dec 3)
- Broncho Billy's Love Affair (Dec 7)
- The Prospector (Dec 12)
- The Sheriff's Luck (Dec 19)
- Broncho Billy's Promise (Dec 21)
- The Sheriff's Inheritance (Dec 24)
- Their Promise (Unk)

== 1913 ==
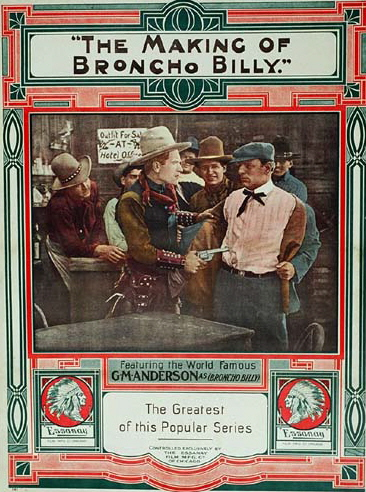
Theatrical poster for The Making of Broncho Billy (Feb 1, 1913)

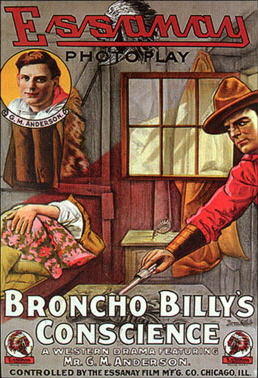
Theatrical poster for Broncho Billy's Conscience (Sep 6, 1913)

- Broncho Billy and the Maid (Jan 4)
- Broncho Billy and the Outlaw's Mother (Jan 11)
- Broncho Billy's Brother (Jan 18)
- Broncho Billy's GunPlay (Jan 25)
- The Making of Broncho Billy (Feb 1)
- Broncho Billy's Last Deed (Feb 8)
- Broncho Billy's Ward (Feb 15)
- Broncho Billy and the Sheriff's Kid (Feb 22)
- The Influence on Broncho Billy (Mar 1)
- A Montana Mix-Up (Mar 6)
- Broncho Billy and the Squatter's Daughter (Mar 8)
- Broncho Billy and the Step-Sisters (Mar 15)
- Broncho Billy's Sister (Mar 22)
- Broncho Billy's Gratefulness (Mar 29)
- Broncho Billy's Way (Apr 5)
- Broncho Billy's Reason (Apr 12)
- The Accusation of Broncho Billy (Apr 15)
- Broncho Billy and the Rustler's Child (Apr 26)
- The Story the Desert Told (May 1)
- The Crazy Prospector (May 3)
- Broncho Billy and the Express Rider (May 24)
- Broncho Billy's Grit (May 17)
- Broncho Billy's Capture (Jun 7)
- The Rustler's Spur (Jun 19)
- Broncho Billy and the Western Girls (Jul 12)
- Broncho Billy and the Schoolmam's Sweetheart (Jul 26)
- The Tenderfoot Sheriff (Aug 2)
- Broncho Billy and the Navajo Maid (Aug 9)
- The Man in the Cabin (Aug 16)
- Broncho Billy's Mistake (Aug 23)
- A Western Sister's Devotion (Aug 30)
- Broncho Billy's Conscience (Sep 6)
- Bonnie of the Hills (Sep 11) *
- Broncho Billy Reforms (Sep 13)
- The Redeemed Claim (Sep 20)
- Days of the Pony Express (Sep 25)
- Why Broncho Billy Left Bear County (Sep 27)
- Belle of the Siskiyou (Oct 2)
- The Struggle (Oct 4)
- Broncho Billy's Oath (Oct 11)
- Broncho Billy Gets Square (Oct 17)
- Broncho Billy's Elopement (Oct 25)
- The Doctor's Duty (Nov 1)
- The Rustler's Step-Daughter (Nov 6)
- Broncho Billy's Secret (Nov 8)
- The New Schoolmarm of Green River (Nov 13)
- Broncho Billy's First Arrest (Nov 22)
- Broncho Billy's Squareness (Dec 6)
- Three Gamblers (Dec 12)
- Broncho Billy's Christmas Deed (Dec 20)

- * Broncho Billy's appearance unconfirmed

== 1914 ==
- Broncho Billy Guardian (Jan 17)
- The Night on the Road (Jan 22)
- Broncho Billy and the Bad Man (Jan 24)
- Broncho Billy and the Settler's Daughter (Jan 31)
- Broncho Billy and the Red Man (Feb 7)
- The Calling of Jim Barton (Feb 14)
- The Interference of Broncho Billy (Mar 14)
- Broncho Billy's True Love (Mar 28)
- The Treachery of Broncho Billy's Pal (Apr 11)
- Broncho Billy and the Rattler (Apr 18)
- Broncho Billy's Indian Romance (Apr 22 or Aug 29)
- Broncho Billy Gunman (Apr 25)
- Broncho Billy's Close Call (May 2)
- Broncho Billy's Sermon (May 9)
- Broncho Billy's Leap (May 16)
- Red Riding Hood of the Hills (May 23)
- Broncho Billy's Cunning Way or Broncho Billy's Cunning (May 30)
- Broncho Billy's Duty (Jun 6)
- Broncho Billy and the Mine Shark (Jun 13)
- Broncho Billy Outlaw (Jun 20)
- Broncho Billy's Jealousy (Jun 27)
- Broncho Billy's Punishment (Jul 4)
- Broncho Billy and the Sheriff (Jul 11)
- Broncho Billy Puts One Over (Jul 18)
- Broncho Billy and the Gambler (Jul 25)
- The Squatter's Gal (Aug 1)
- Broncho Billy's Fatal Joke (Aug 8)
- Broncho Billy Wins Out (Aug 15)
- Broncho Billy's Wild Ride (Aug 22)
- Broncho Billy the Vagabond (Sep 5)
- Broncho Billy a Friend in Need (Sep 12)
- Broncho Billy Butts In (Sep 19)
- Strategy of Broncho Billy's Sweetheart (Sep 26)
- Broncho Billy, Trapper or Broncho Billy Trapped (Oct 3)
- Broncho Billy and the Greaser (Oct 10)
- Broncho Billy Rewarded (Oct 17)
- Broncho Billy-Favorite (Oct 24)
- Broncho Billy's Mother (Oct 31)
- Broncho Billy's Scheme (Nov 21)
- Broncho Billy's Decision (Nov 14)
- The Tell-Tale Hand (Nov 19)
- Broncho Billy's Double Escape (Nov 28)
- Broncho Billy's Judgment (Dec 5)
- Broncho Billy's Dad (Dec 12)
- Broncho Billy's Christmas Spirit (Dec 19)
- Broncho Billy and the Sheriff's Office (Dec 26)

== 1915 ==
Theatrical poster for The Indian's Narrow Escape (Nov 5, 1915)

- Broncho Billy and the Escaped Bandit or Broncho Billy and the Escape Artist (Jan 2)
- Broncho Billy and the Claim Jumpers (Jan 9)
- Broncho Billy and the Baby (Jan 23)
- Broncho Billy and the False Note (Jan 30)
- Broncho Billy's Greaser Deputy (Feb 6)
- Broncho Billy's Sentence (Feb 13)
- Broncho Billy and the Vigilante (Feb 20)
- Broncho Billy's Brother (Different from Jan 18, 1913 film) (Feb 27)
- Broncho Billy's Vengeance (Mar 6)
- Broncho Billy's Teachings (Mar 13)
- The Western Way (Mar 20)
- The Outlaw's Awakening (Mar 27)
- Ingomar of the Hills (Apr 3)
- Andy of the Royal Mounted (Apr 10)
- The Face at the Curtain (Apr 16)
- His Wife's Secret (Apr 23)
- His Regeneration (May 7)
- The Other Girl (May 14)
- The Revenue Agent aka Broncho Billy and the Revenue Agent (May 21)
- The Bachelor's Burglar (May 28)
- Broncho Billy's Word of Honor (Jun 4)
- Broncho Billy and the Land Grabber (Jun 18)
- The Little Prospector (Jul 2)
- Broncho Billy Well Repaid (Jul 9)
- The Bachelor's Baby (Jul 16)
- Broncho Billy and the Posse (Jul 23)
- Broncho Billy's Protege (Jul 29)
- Broncho Billy's Surrender (Jul 30)
- Broncho Billy Steps In (Aug 13)
- Broncho Billy's Marriage (Aug 20, re-released Dec 17)
- Her Return (Aug 27)
- Broncho Billy Begins Life Anew (Sep 3)
- Broncho Billy and the Lumber King (Sep 10)
- Broncho Billy and the Card Sharp (Sep 17)
- The Convict's Threat (Sep 18)
- An Unexpected Romance (Sep 24)
- Broncho Billy Misled (Oct 1)
- Broncho Billy, Sheepman (Oct 8)
- Broncho Billy's Parents (Oct 15)
- Broncho Billy Evens Matters (Oct 22)
- Broncho Billy's Cowardly Brother (Oct 29)
- Broncho Billy's Mexican Wife (Remake of the Nov 30, 1912 film) (Nov 5)
- The Indian's Narrow Escape (Nov 15)
- Too Much Turkey (Nov 19)
- Broncho Billy's Love Affair (Different story from Dec 7, 1912 film) (Nov 26)
- The Burglar's Godfather (Dec 3)
- The Escape of Broncho Billy (Dec 10)
- A Christmas Revenge (Dec 18)
- Broncho Billy and the MacGuire Gang (Unk)
- Broncho Billy and the Parson (Unk)

== Later years ==
- Her Lesson (January 4, 1916) (Directed)
- The Book Agent's Romance (January 18, 1916) (Directed)
- The Man in Him (February 7, 1916) (Directed)
- Humanity (1916 film) (6 reels) (May 19, 1917) (as "Broncho Billy Adair")
- Naked Hands (1918)
- Shootin' Mad (1918) (Broncho Billy)
- Red Blood and Yellow (1919) (Jack/Jim) (Directed)
- The Son-of-a-Gun (1919) (the Son of a Gun) (Directed)
- Red Blood and Yellow (1919) (Directed)
- The Weak-End Party (1922) (Directed)
- The Pest (1922) (Directed)
- Wide Wide World - The Western (1958) (TV) (Himself)
- The Bounty Killer (1965) (Old Man)

== See also ==
- Essanay Studios
