= Art Acord =

American actor (1890–1931)

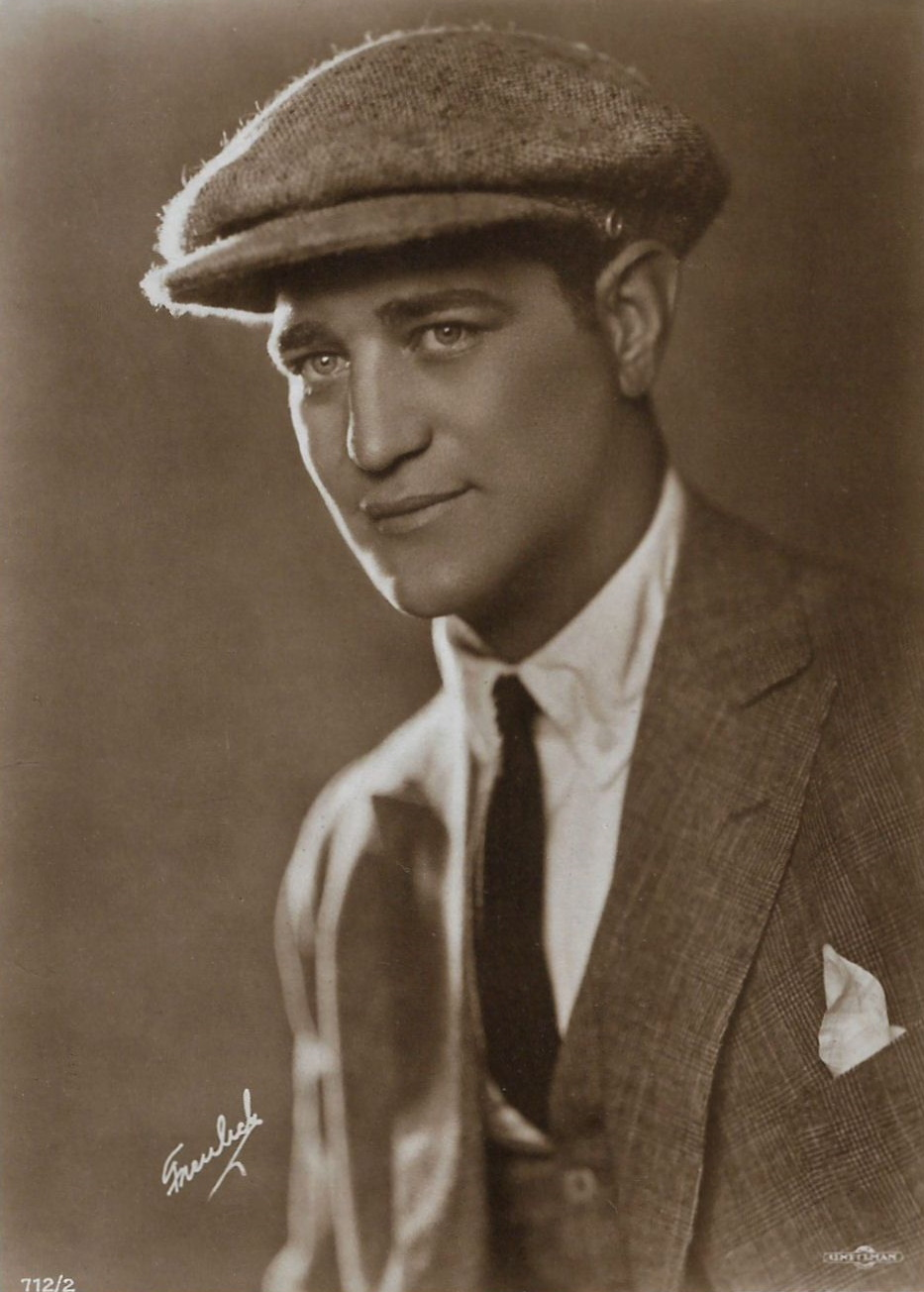
- Acord, c. 1920
- Born: Arthemus Ward Acord; April 17, 1890; Glenwood, Utah, U.S.
- Died: January 4, 1931 (aged 40); Chihuahua, Chihuahua, Mexico
- Resting place: Forest Lawn Memorial Park, Glendale
- Other name: Buck Parvin
- Occupations: Silent film actor, stunt performer, ranch hand, miner
- Years active: 1912–1929
- Spouses: Edythe Sterling (m. 1913; div. 1916) Edna Nores (m. 1920; div. 1925) Louise Lorraine (m. 1926; div. 1928)

Arthemus Ward "Art" Acord (April 17, 1890 – January 4, 1931) was an American silent film actor and rodeo champion. After his film career ended in 1929, Acord worked in rodeo road shows and as a miner in Mexico.

== Early life and career ==
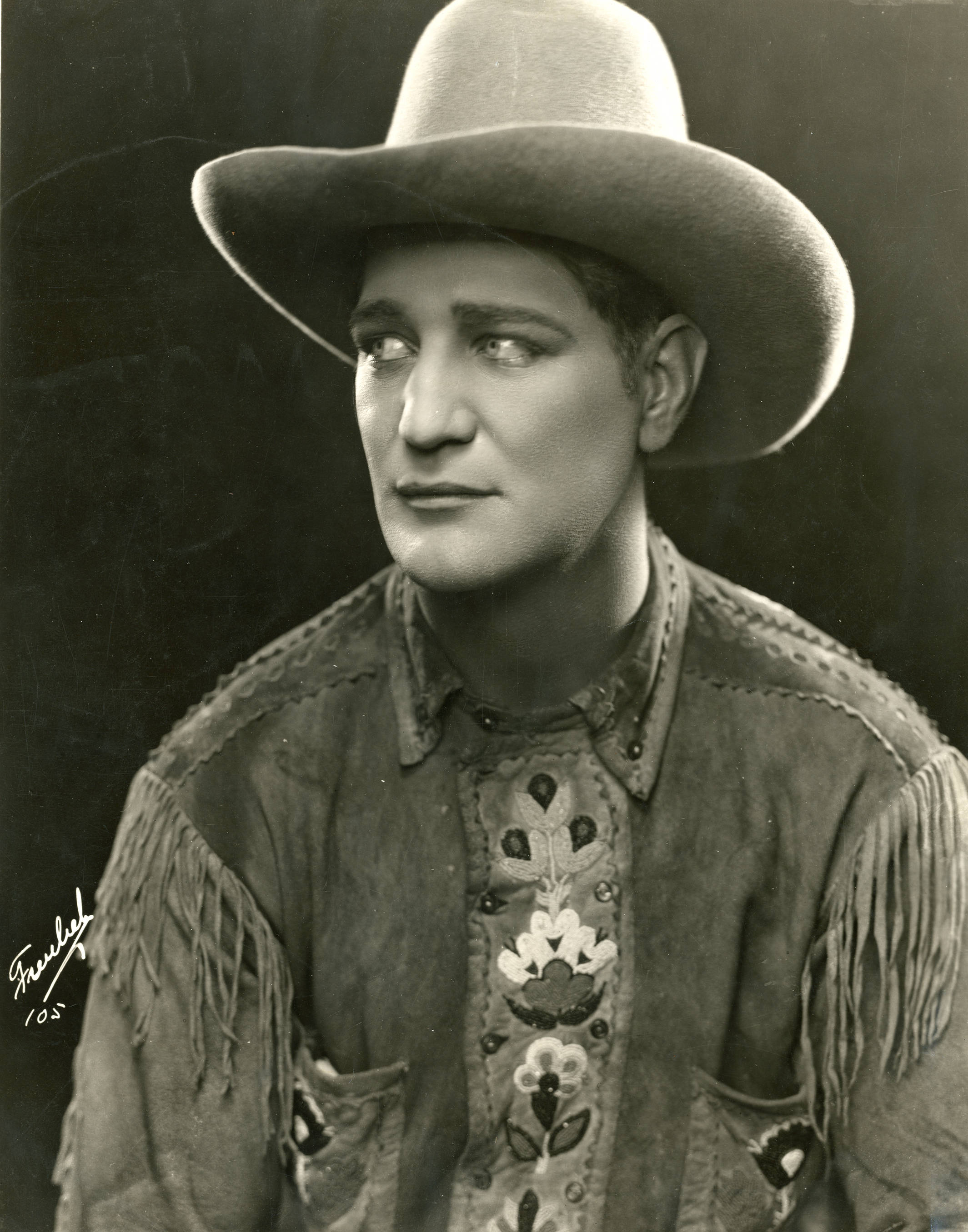
Acord in 1922

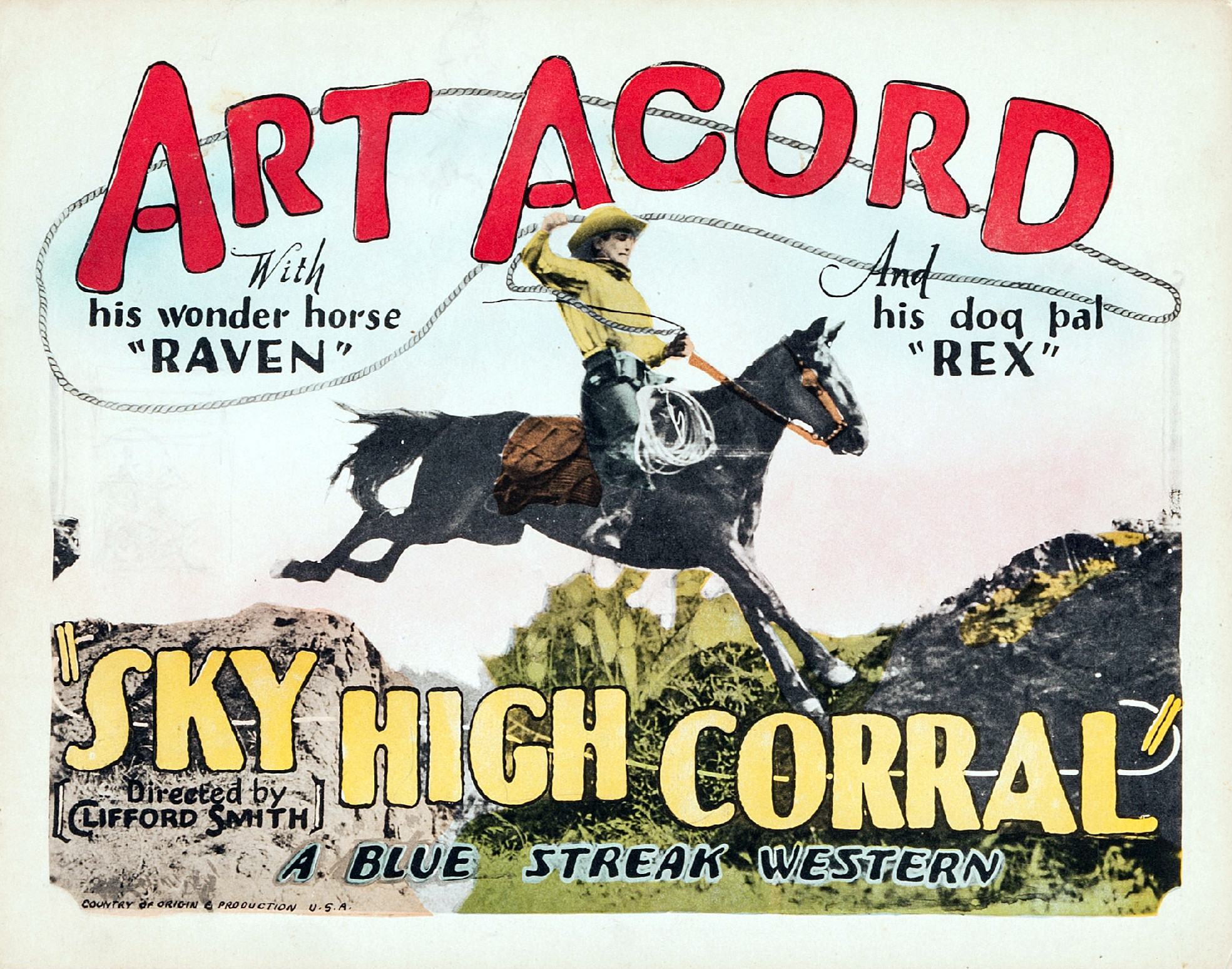
Acord in Sky High Corral (1926)

Acord was born in Prattville, Utah, to Valentine Louis Acord and Mary Amelia Acord (née Pedersen), Utah pioneers and members of the Church of Jesus Christ of Latter-day Saints. Acord's father was of German and English descent. The Acord family descends from a Prussian mercenary soldier of the American Revolutionary War whose name was Eckert. Acord's paternal grandmother was a descendant of Frances Latham, an early settler of New England who has been called the "Mother of Governors" and the "Mother of Champion Cowboys". Acord's mother, who was of Danish descent, died when Art was just 19 months old while the family was living in the Stillwater, Oklahoma area. The Acord family had moved there for the mother's health and took part in the September 28, 1891 Oklahoma Land Run. She died a few weeks later on November 28, 1891. After her death, the family moved back to Utah. As a young man, Acord worked as a cowboy, ranch hand and rodeo contestant. He worked on the ranch of Preston Nutter. In 1912, he won the World Steer Wrestling (Bulldogging) Championship at the Pendleton Round-up and won that same World Championship title again in 1916, defeating challenger and friend Hoot Gibson.

Acord was one of the few cowboys to have ridden the acclaimed bucking horse Steamboat (who later inspired the bucking horse logo on the Wyoming license plate) for a qualified ride and championship. His rodeo skills had been sharpened when he worked for a time for the Miller Brothers' traveling 101 Ranch Wild West Show. It was with the 101 that he became friends with Tom Mix, Yakima Canutt, Bee Ho Gray, "Broncho Billy" Anderson and Hoot Gibson. He was sometimes called the "Mormon cowboy" and has been noted as the first real cowboy to become a Hollywood cowboy. He went on to become a noted actor in silent Western films. Acord also performed as a stunt man. He made over 100 film shorts, most of which are now considered lost.

Acord enlisted in the United States Army in World War I and served overseas. He was awarded the Croix de Guerre for bravery. At war's end, he returned to the motion picture business, appearing in a series of popular film shorts and as "Buck Parvin", the title character for a Universal Pictures serial. Because of a heavy drinking problem and his inability to adapt to the advent of talkies, Acord's film career declined and he ended up performing in road shows and mining in Mexico. In March 1928 Acord was seriously burned in an explosion at his home; the loss of his sight was feared.

== Personal life ==
Acord was married three times. His first marriage was to actress Edythe Sterling in 1913. They divorced in 1916. In 1920, he married former actress Edna May Nores. Nores filed for divorce in April 1924 citing physical abuse and infidelity. The divorce was finalized the following year. His third marriage was to actress Louise Lorraine on April 14, 1926. The couple divorced in June 1928.

== Death ==
On January 4, 1931, Acord died in a Chihuahua, Mexico hospital shortly after taking cyanide in a local hotel room. He was depressed and told the doctor who treated him shortly before he died that he had intentionally taken poison because he wanted to die. His body was sent back to California by train. He was given a military funeral with full honors and was buried in the Vale of Memory section in Forest Lawn Memorial Park Cemetery in Glendale, California.

For his contribution to the motion picture industry, Acord has a star on the Hollywood Walk of Fame at 1709 Vine Street.

== Partial filmography ==
Short subject
| Year | Title | Role | Notes |
|---|---|---|---|
| 1910 | Pride of the Range | | Stunt performer |
| 1910 | The Two Brothers | | Stunt performer |
| 1910 | The Sergeant | Indian scout | Extant |
| 1911 | Range Pals | Cowhand | Uncredited |
| 1911 | The White Medicine Man | | Uncredited |
| 1912 | Custer's Last Fight | Trooper | Extant |
| 1912 | On the Warpath | Arrow Head, as a Young Brave | |
| 1913 | The Claim Jumper | Deputy | |
| 1914 | The Cherry Pickers | Hussar | |
| 1915 | Buckshot John | Hairtrigger Jordan | |
| 1915 | The Cowboy's Sweetheart | Jim Lawson, Cowboy | |
| 1915 | A Cattle Queen's Romance | Bart, Dallia Ranch Cowboy | |
| 1916 | Margy of the Foothills | Ben Marlin | |
| 1916 | Curlew Corliss | Curlew Corliss | |
| 1916 | Under Azure Skies | Bill Hardy | |
| 1919 | The Wild Westerner | Larry Norton | |
| 1919 | The Fighting Line | Mart Long | |
| 1919 | The Kid and the Cowboy | Jud | |
| 1920 | The Fiddler of the Little Big Horn | | |
| 1920 | Call of the West | | |
| 1921 | Fair Fighting | Bud Austin | |
| 1922 | Go Get 'em Gates | Go Get 'em Gates | |
| 1922 | Tracked Down | Barney McFee, RCMP | |

Features
| Year | Title | Role | Notes |
|---|---|---|---|
| 1912 | The Invaders | Telegrapher | Stunt double |
| 1914 | The Squaw Man | Art - Townsman | Extant |
| 1917 | Heart and Soul | Undetermined Role | Uncredited |
| 1917 | The Show Down | | |
| 1917 | Cleopatra | Kephren | Lost film |
| 1918 | Headin' South | | Lost film |
| 1920 | The Moon Riders | Buck Ravelle, a Ranger | Lost film |
| 1921 | The White Horseman | Wayne Allen/The White Horseman | Lost film |
| 1921 | Winners of the West | Arthur Standish/The Mysterious Spaniard | Serial; Lost film |
| 1922 | In the Days of Buffalo Bill | Art Taylor | Lost film |
| 1923 | Don't Come To Hollywood | Undetermined lead role | Lost film - directed by Ward Wing with Lillian Marshall, Victor Rodman & Henry Woodward |
| 1923 | The Oregon Trail | Jean Brulet | Lost film |
| 1924 | Fighting for Justice | Bullets Bernard | |
| 1924 | Looped for Life | Buck Dawn | |
| 1925 | Three in Exile | Art Flanders | |
| 1925 | The Circus Cyclone | Jack Manning | |
| 1925 | The Call of Courage | Steve Caldwell | |
| 1925 | The Wild Girl | Billy Woodruff | |
| 1925 | Pals | Bruce Taylor | |
| 1925 | The Silent Guardian | Jim Sullivan | |
| 1926 | The Set-Up | Deputy Art Stratton | |
| 1926 | Sky High Corral | Jack McCabe | Extant |
| 1926 | The Terror | Art Downs | |
| 1926 | Lazy Lightning | Lance Lighton | |
| 1927 | Loco Luck | Bud Harris | |
| 1927 | The Western Rover | Art Seaton/Art Hayes | |
| 1927 | Spurs and Saddles | Jack Marley | |
| 1928 | Two-Gun O'Brien | Two-Gun O'Brien | |
| 1928 | His Last Battle | | |
| 1929 | The White Outlaw | Johnny "The White Outlaw" Douglas | Extant |
| 1929 | Wyoming Tornado | | |
| 1929 | The Arizona Kid | Bill "The Arizona Kid" Strong | Alternative title: Pursued |
| 1929 | Fighters of the Saddle | Dick Weatherby | Extant |
| 1930 | Trailing Trouble | Art Dobson (uncredited) | Extant (talking film) |

== See also ==
- List of actors with Hollywood Walk of Fame motion picture stars
