= Marguerite Clayton =

American actress

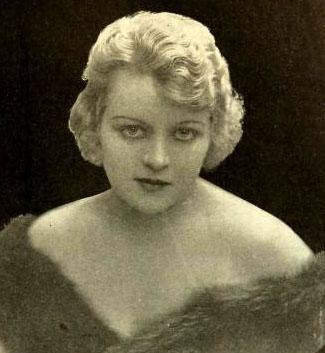
- Clayton in August 1917 issue of Moving Picture World
- Born: April 12, 1891; Ogden, Utah, U.S.
- Died: December 20, 1968 (aged 77); Los Angeles, California, U.S.
- Resting place: Arlington National Cemetery
- Occupation: Actress
- Years active: 1909–1928
- Spouse: Victor Bertrandias (died 1961)

Marguerite Clayton (born Margaret Fitzgerald; April 12, 1891 – December 20, 1968) was an American actress of the silent era. She appeared in more than 170 films between 1909 and 1928, many of which were westerns with Broncho Billy Anderson and Harry Carey.

== Biography ==
Margaret Fitzgerald was born in Ogden, Utah, on April 12, 1891 and attended St. Mary's Academy in Salt Lake City, Utah. Her father was a mining engineer.

In 1909, Clayton made her first films, A Mexican's Gratitude and The Heart of a Cowboy, with Anderson. Her film career ended in 1928. Her employers included Essanay.

Clayton died in Los Angeles, California, in a road accident. She was buried with her husband Major General Victor Bertrandias in Arlington National Cemetery.

== Selected filmography ==
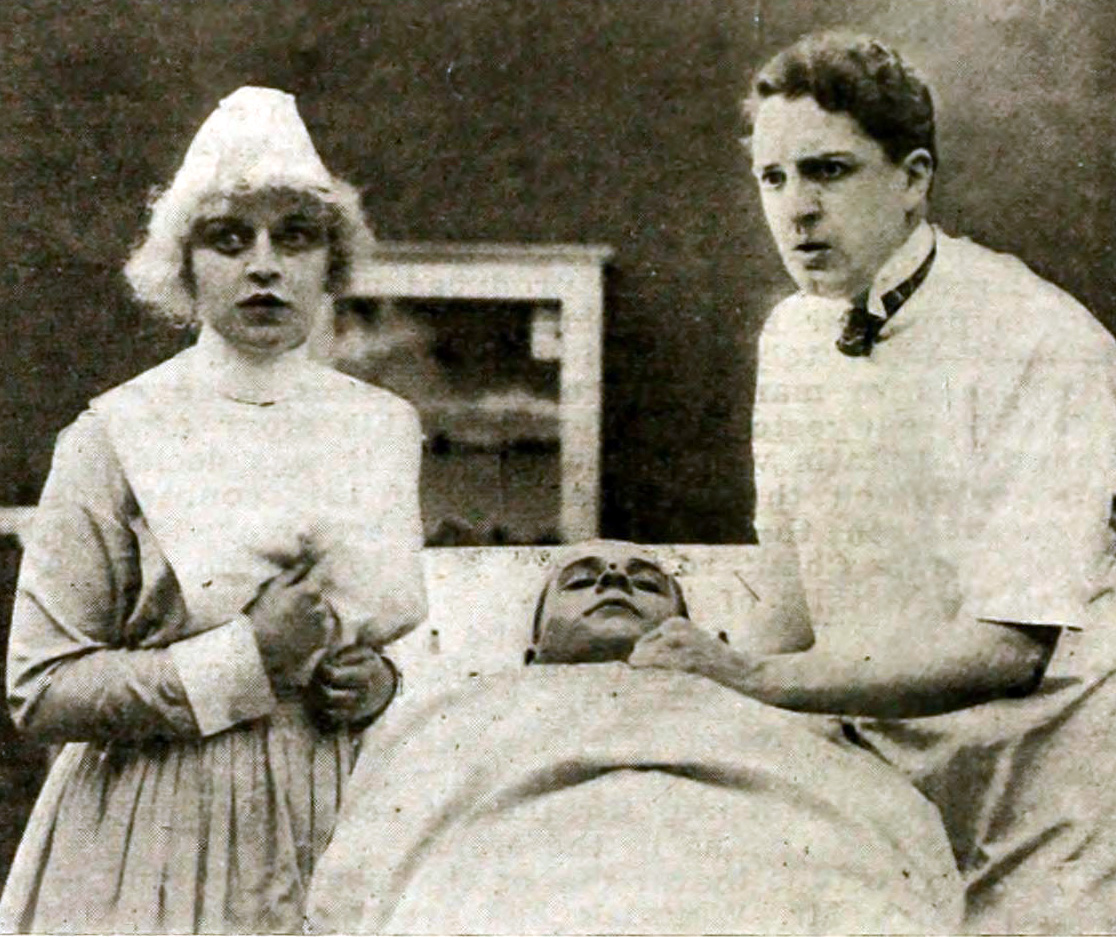
Clayton with Bryant Washburn in The Promise Land, 1916

- A Christmas Revenge (1915)
- His Regeneration (1915)
- The Prince of Graustark (1916)
- Hit-The-Trail Holliday (1918)
- Inside the Lines (1918)
- The New Moon (1919)
- Bride 13 (1920)
- The Pleasure Seekers (1920)
- The Inside of the Cup (1921)
- Go Get 'Em Hutch (1922)
- The Curse of Drink (1922)
- Canyon of the Fools (1923)
- Desert Driven (1923)
- The Dawn of a Tomorrow (1924)
- The Circus Cowboy (1924)
- Flashing Spurs (1924)
- The Street of Tears (1924)
- Tiger Thompson (1924)
- Barriers of the Law (1925)
- Wolf Blood (1925)
- The Power of the Weak (1926)
- The Palm Beach Girl (1926)
- Sky High Corral (1926)
- Inspiration (1928)
