= The Secret Man =

1917 film directed by John Ford

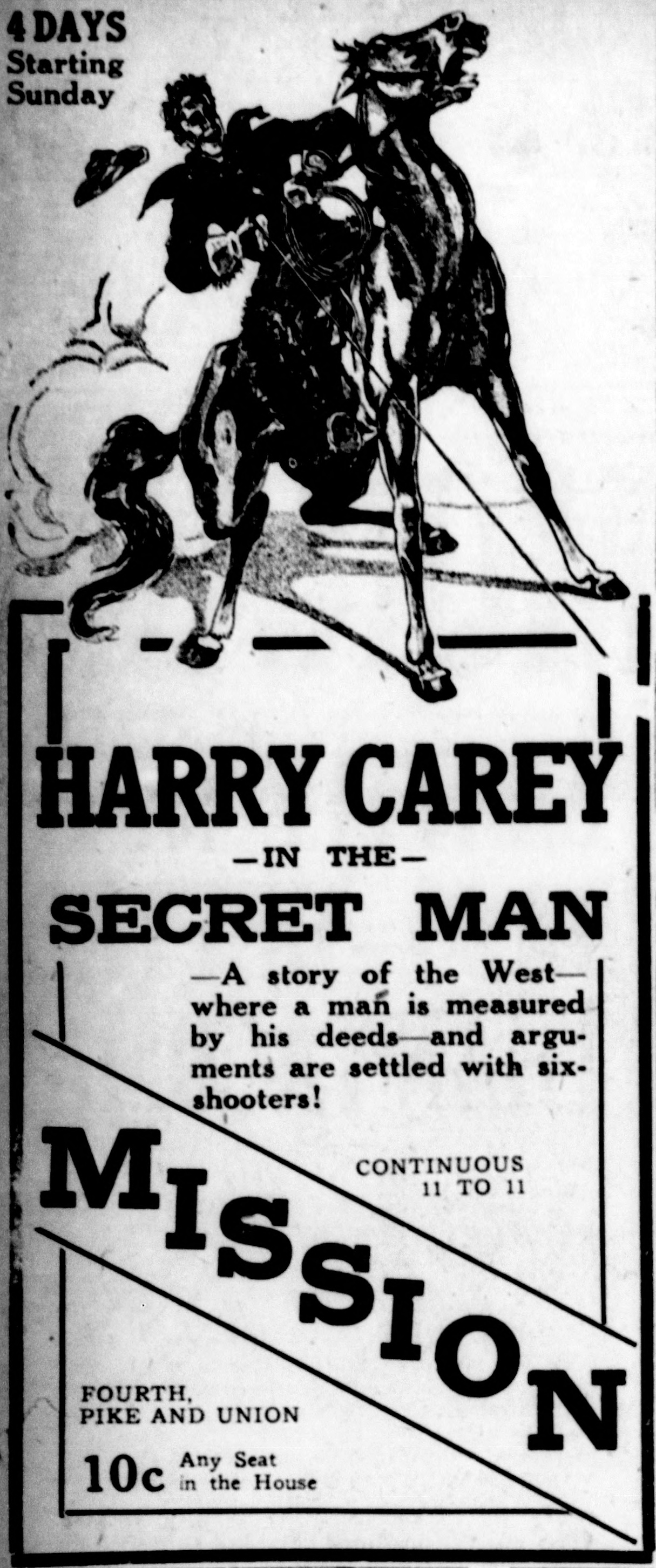
- Newspaper advertisement
- Directed by: John Ford
- Written by: John Ford; George Hively
- Starring: Harry Carey
- Cinematography: Ben F. Reynolds
- Distributed by: Universal Pictures
- Release date: October 1, 1917
- Running time: 50 minutes
- Country: United States
- Languages: Silent; English intertitles

The Secret Man is a 1917 American silent Western film, directed by John Ford and featuring Harry Carey. Two of the five reels of the film survive at the Library of Congress film archive.

== Plot ==
As described in a film magazine, Cheyenne Harry (Carey) escapes from prison and while escaping comes upon the body of a young girl (Janes) that was thrown by a runaway horse. He picks her up and is proceeding on his way when his horse is frightened and bolts down a steep hillside. Harry, realizing the danger the girl is in, gives himself up so that she can receive care. Her mother Molly (Sterling) has secretly married Harry Beaufort (Foster) and it is her mother's brother who arrests Harry. The mother has been told that her little girl is dead and she loses her reason. At a church bazaar the girl is to be auctioned off to the highest bidder. Mother and daughter recognize each other and the mother's mind is restored. Through the assistance of Harry, the mother and her husband are reunited. The sheriff is happy to find that the girl Annabelle is his niece and in appreciation of Harry's kindness allows him to go free.

== Cast ==
- Harry Carey as Harry "Cheyenne Harry" Henderson
- Edythe Sterling as Molly (credited as Edith Sterling)
- J. Morris Foster as Harry Beaufort (credited as Morris Foster)
- Elizabeth Janes as His Child
- Vester Pegg as Bill
- William Steele as The Foreman (credited as Bill Gettinger)
- Steve Clemente as Pedro, The Foreman (credited as Steve Clement)
- Hoot Gibson as Chuck Fadden

== Production ==
Filming took place under the working titles The Round Up and Up Against It. The film was released by Universal Studios through a subsidiary, Universal-Butterfly, in October 1917. It was a silent film on five reels, part of the "Cheyenne Harry" series of film featurettes.

== Reception ==
Like many American films of the time, The Secret Man was subject to cuts by city and state film censorship boards. The Chicago Board of Censors required a cut of the scene of the jailer dropping the keys before the prisoner's cell.

== See also ==
- John Ford filmography
- Harry Carey filmography
- Hoot Gibson filmography
- List of incomplete or partially lost films
