= Spurs and Saddles =

1927 film

- Directed by: Clifford Smith
- Screenplay by: Harrison Jacobs
- Story by: Paul M. Bryan
- Starring: Art Acord; Fay Wray; William J. Dyer; J. Gordon Russell; C.E. Anderson; Monte Montague
- Cinematography: Edward Linden
- Production company: Universal Pictures
- Distributed by: Universal Pictures
- Release date: July 17, 1927
- Running time: 50 minutes
- Country: United States
- Languages: Silent; English intertitles

Spurs and Saddles is a 1927 American silent Western film directed by Clifford Smith and written by Harrison Jacobs. The film stars Art Acord, Fay Wray, William J. Dyer, J. Gordon Russell, C.E. Anderson and Monte Montague. The film was released on July 17, 1927, by Universal Pictures.

== Cast ==
- Art Acord as Jack Marley
- Fay Wray as Mildred Orth
- William J. Dyer as Bud Bailey
- J. Gordon Russell as 'Blaze' Holton
- C.E. Anderson as Hawk
- Monte Montague as Stage Driver
- Raven the Horse as Buddy
