= Fay Wray =

American actress (1907–2004)

- Publicity portrait of actress Fay Wray, c. 1930
- Born: Vina Fay Wray; September 15, 1907; Cardston, Alberta, Canada
- Died: August 8, 2004 (aged 96); New York City, U.S.
- Resting place: Hollywood Forever Cemetery in Los Angeles, California
- Occupation: Actress
- Years active: 1923–1980
- Spouses: John Monk Saunders (m. 1928; div. 1939) Robert Riskin (m. 1942; died 1955) Sanford Rothenberg (m. 1971; died 1991)
- Children: 3, including Victoria Riskin
- Relatives: Daniel Webster Jones (grandfather); Dan P. Jones (uncle)

Vina Fay Wray (September 15, 1907 – August 8, 2004) was a Canadian-American actress that had an acting career spanning nearly six decades. She rose to fame by starring in producer Eric von Stroheim's The Wedding March (1928), as well as The Legion of the Condemned (1928) and Thunderbolt (1929) for Paramount. Wray then gained international recognition by playing Ann Darrow in RKO's 1933 film King Kong.

Early in her career Wray gained media attention as one of the WAMPAS Baby Stars in 1926. This led to her contract with Paramount Pictures as a teenager, where she made more than a dozen feature films. After leaving Paramount, she signed deals with various film companies, got her first roles in horror films and many other types, including in The Bowery (1933) and Viva Villa! (1934), both of which star Wallace Beery. For RKO Radio Pictures, Inc., Wray starred in her most identifiable film, King Kong (1933). After its success, she had numerous roles in film and television, retiring in 1980.

== Life and career ==
=== Early life ===
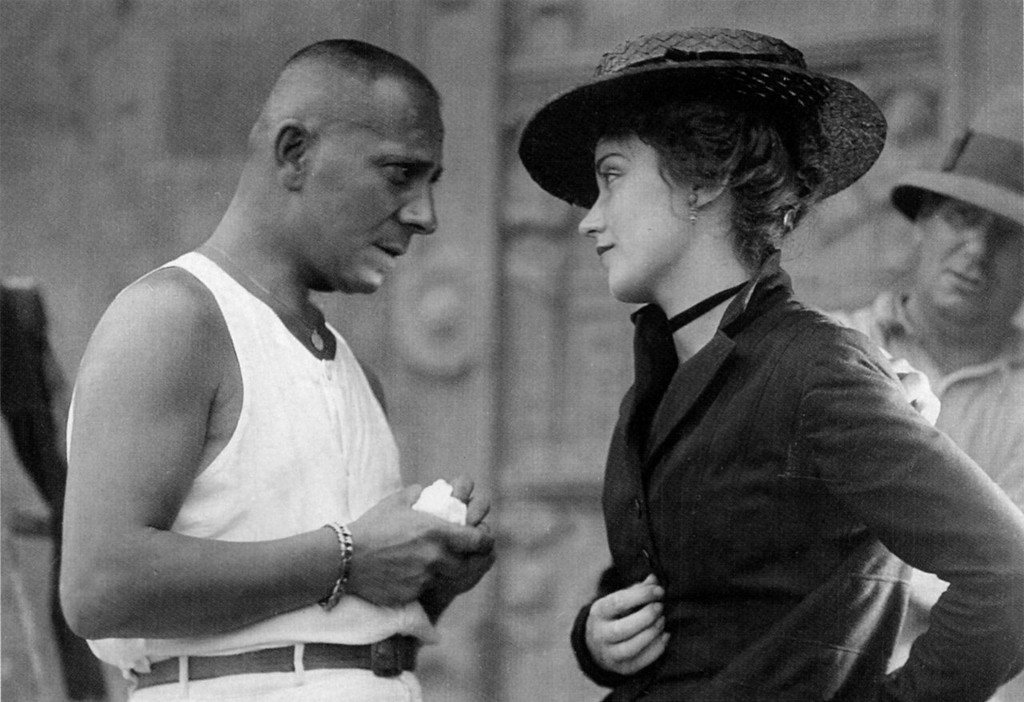
Erich von Stroheim and Fay Wray on the set of the film The Wedding March.

Wray was born on a ranch near Cardston, Alberta, to parents who were members of the Church of Jesus Christ of Latter-day Saints: Elvina Marguerite Jones from Salt Lake City, Utah and Joseph Heber Wray from Kingston upon Hull, England. They had six children and she was a granddaughter of LDS pioneer Daniel Webster Jones. Her ancestors came from England, Scotland, Ireland, Northern Ireland and Wales.

Wray's family returned to the United States a few years after she was born; they moved to Salt Lake City in 1912 and moved to Lark, Utah (now a ghost town,) in 1914. In 1919, the Wray family returned to Salt Lake City, and then relocated to Hollywood, where she attended Hollywood High School.

=== Early acting career ===
Fay Wray in Thunderbolt (1929)

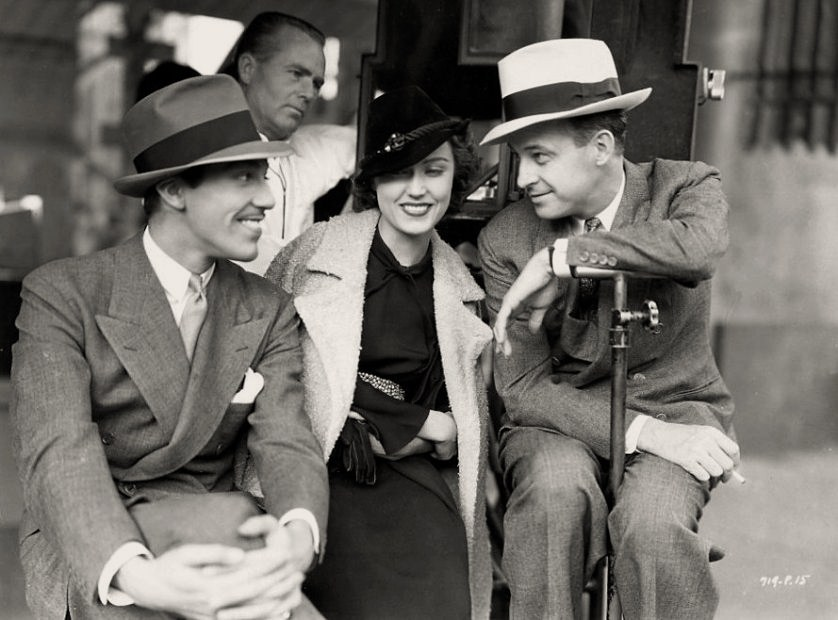
Cesar Romero, Wray, director Richard Thorpe, and cinematographer George Robinson (in background) on the set of Cheating Cheaters (1934)

In 1923, Wray appeared in her first film at the age of 16, when she landed a role in a short historical film sponsored by a local newspaper. In the 1920s, Wray appeared in the silent film The Coast Patrol (1925) and uncredited bit parts in Hal Roach Studios shorts.

In 1926, the Western Association of Motion Picture Advertisers selected Wray as one of the WAMPAS Baby Stars, a group of women whom they believed to be on the threshold of movie stardom. She was at the time under contract to Universal Pictures, mostly co-starring in low-budget Westerns opposite Buck Jones.

The following year, Wray was signed to a contract with Paramount Pictures. In 1926, director Erich von Stroheim cast her as the main female lead Mitzi Schrammell in his film The Wedding March, released by Paramount two years later. The film was noted for its high budget and production values but was a financial failure. It also gave Wray her first lead role. Wray stayed with Paramount to make more than a dozen films and made the transition from silent films to "talkies".

=== Horror films and King Kong ===
After leaving Paramount, Wray signed with other film studios. Under these deals, Wray was cast in several horror films, including Doctor X (1932) and Mystery of the Wax Museum (1933). Her best known films were produced under her deal with RKO Radio Pictures. Her first film with RKO was The Most Dangerous Game (1932), co-starring Joel McCrea. The production was filmed at night on the same jungle sets used for King Kong during the day, and with Wray and Robert Armstrong starring in both movies.

The Most Dangerous Game was followed by the release of Wray's best-remembered film King Kong. According to Wray, Jean Harlow had been RKO's original choice, but because MGM put Harlow under exclusive contract during the pre-production phase of the film, she became unavailable. Wray was approached by director Merian C. Cooper to play King Kong's blonde captive, Ann Darrow, for which she was paid US$10,000 (equivalent to about $200,000 in 2025). The film was a commercial success and Wray was reportedly proud that it saved RKO from bankruptcy.

=== Later career ===
1930s studio publicity portrait of actress Fay Wray

Wray continued starring in films, including The Richest Girl in the World, but by the early 1940s, her appearances became less frequent. Angela is Twenty-Two, a play she co-wrote with Sinclair Lewis in 1938, was adapted as the 1944 film This Is the Life. She retired in 1942 after her second marriage but due to financial exigencies, she soon resumed her acting career, and over the next three decades, she appeared in several films and appeared frequently on television. She portrayed Catherine Morrison in the 1953–54 sitcom The Pride of the Family with Natalie Wood as her daughter Ann. Wray appeared in Queen Bee and The Cobweb, both released in 1955.

Wray appeared in three episodes of Perry Mason: "The Case of the Prodigal Parent" (1958); "The Case of the Watery Witness" (1959), as murder victim Lorna Thomas; and "The Case of the Fatal Fetish" (1965), as voodoo practitioner Mignon Germaine. Wray also co-starred with Perry Mason star Raymond Burr in the 1957 noir film release Crime of Passion.

In 1959, Wray was cast as Tula Marsh in the episode "The Second Happiest Day" of Playhouse 90. Other roles around this time were in the episodes "Dip in the Pool" (1958) and "The Morning After" of CBS's Alfred Hitchcock Presents. In 1960, she appeared as Clara in an episode of 77 Sunset Strip, "Who Killed Cock Robin?" Another 1960 role was that of Mrs. Staunton, with Gigi Perreau as

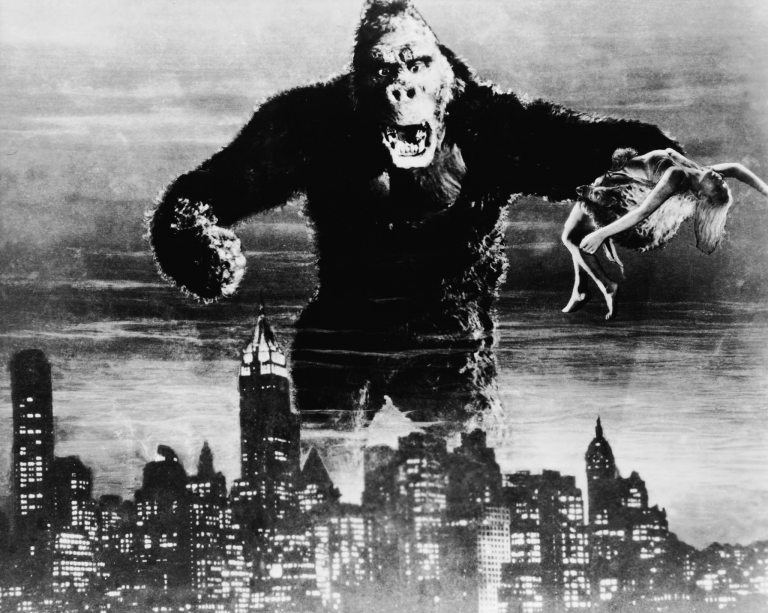
Fay Wray (right) in the 1933 feature film King Kong

her daughter Julie, in the episode "Flight from Terror" of The Islanders. Wray appeared in a 1961 episode of The Real McCoys titled "Theatre in the Barn". In 1963, she played Mrs. Brubaker in The Eleventh Hour episode "You're So Smart, Why Can't You Be Good?" She ended her acting career with the 1980 made-for-television film Gideon's Trumpet.

In 1989, her autobiography was released, On the Other Hand. In her later years, Wray continued to make public appearances. In 1991, she was crowned Queen of the Beaux Arts Ball, presiding with King Herbert Huncke. She was approached by James Cameron to play Rose Dawson Calvert for his blockbuster Titanic (1997) with Kate Winslet to play her younger self but she turned down the role, which was subsequently portrayed by Gloria Stuart in an Academy Award for Best Supporting Actress nominated performance. She was a special guest at the 70th Academy Awards, where the show's host Billy Crystal introduced her as the "Beauty who charmed the Beast". She was the only 1920s Hollywood actress in attendance that evening. On October 3, 1998, she appeared at the Pine Bluff Film Festival, which showed The Wedding March with live orchestral accompaniment.

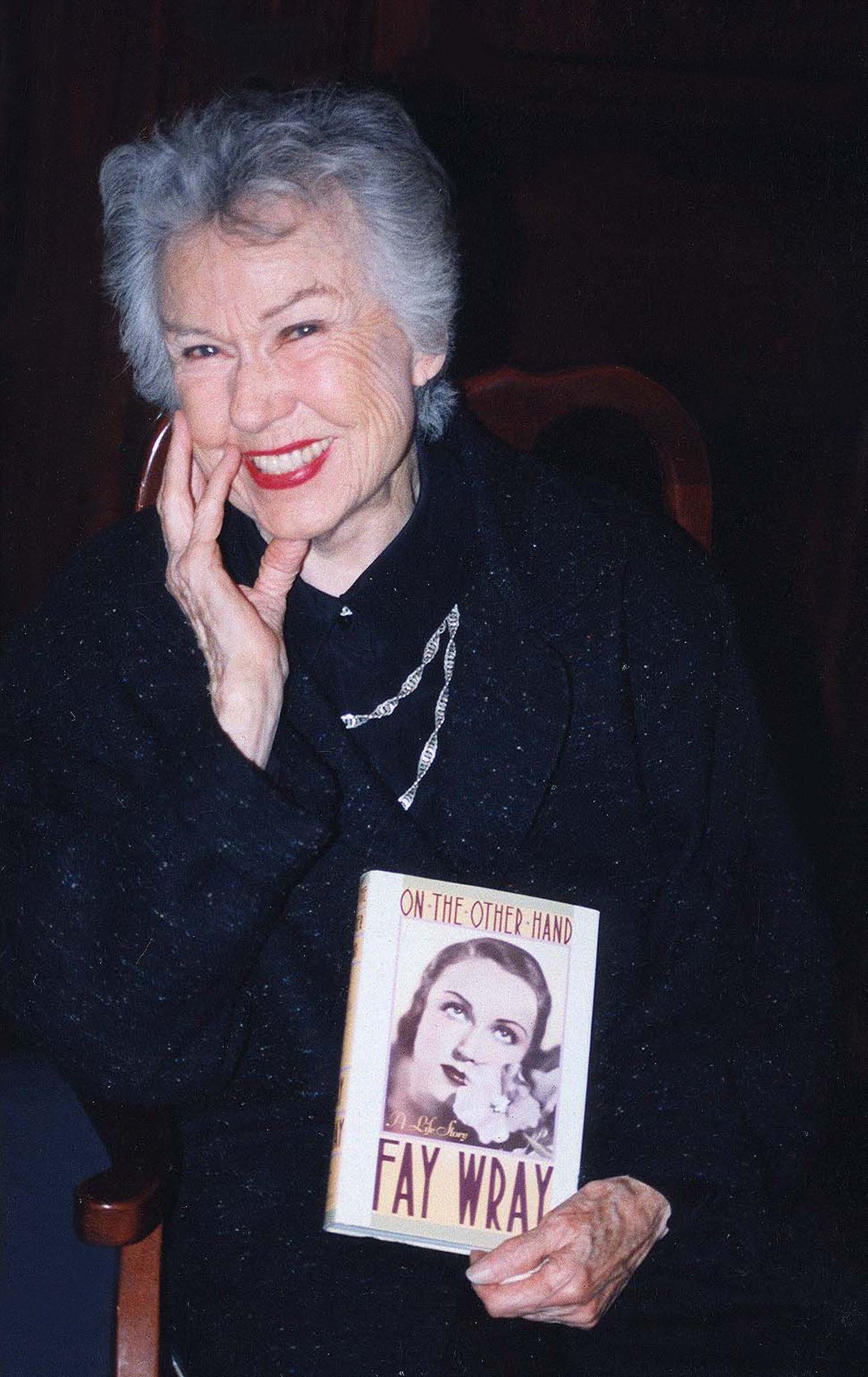
Wray holds her autobiography titled On the Other Hand.

In January 2003, at age 95, Wray appeared at the Palm Beach International Film Festival to celebrate the Rick McKay documentary film Broadway: The Golden Age, by the Legends Who Were There, where she was honored with a Legend in Film award. In her later years, she visited the Empire State Building frequently; in 1991, she was a guest of honor at the building's 60th anniversary, and in May 2004, she made one of her last public appearances at the building. Her final public appearance was at the premiere of the documentary film Broadway: The Golden Age, by the Legends Who Were There in June 2004.

== Personal life ==
Wray married three times – to writers John Monk Saunders and Robert Riskin and the neurosurgeon Sanford Rothenberg (January 28, 1919 – January 4, 1991). She had three children: Susan Saunders, Victoria Riskin, and Robert Riskin Jr. After returning to the US after finishing The Clairvoyant she became a naturalized citizen of the United States in May 1935.

== Death ==
Wray died in her sleep of natural causes at age 96 on the night of August 8, 2004, in her apartment on Fifth Avenue in Manhattan. She is interred at the Hollywood Forever Cemetery in Hollywood, California. Two days after her death, the lights of the Empire State Building were lowered for 15 minutes in her memory.

== Honors ==
In 1989, Wray was awarded the Women in Film Crystal Award. Wray was honored with a Legend in Film award at the 2003 Palm Beach International Film Festival. For her contribution to the motion picture industry, Wray was honored with a star on the Hollywood Walk of Fame at 6349 Hollywood Boulevard. She received a star posthumously on Canada's Walk of Fame in Toronto on June 5, 2005. A small park near Lee's Creek on Main Street in Cardston, Alberta, her birthplace, was named Fay Wray Park in her honor. The small sign at the edge of the park on Main Street has a silhouette of King Kong. A large oil portrait of Wray by Alberta artist Neil Boyle is on display in the Empress Theatre in Fort Macleod, Alberta. In May 2006, Wray became one of the first four entertainers to be honored by Canada Post by being featured on a postage stamp.

== Filmography ==
=== Features ===
Year	Title	Role	Notes
1925	The Coast Patrol	Beth Slocum	
1925	A Lover's Oath	Dancer	Uncredited; lost film
1925	Ben-Hur: A Tale of the Christ	Slave Girl	Unconfirmed, uncredited
1926	The Man in the Saddle	Pauline Stewart	lost film
1926	The Wild Horse Stampede	Jessie Hayden	
1926	Lazy Lightning	Lila Rogers	
1927	Loco Luck	Molly Vernon	
1927	A One Man Game	Roberta Robbins	lost film
1927	Spurs and Saddles	Mildred Orth	
1928	The Legion of the Condemned	Christine Charteris	lost film
1928	The Street of Sin	Elizabeth	lost film
1928	The First Kiss	Anna Lee	lost film
1928	The Wedding March	Mitzerl "Mitzi" Schrammell	
1929	The Four Feathers	Ethne Eustace	
1929	Thunderbolt	Ritzie	
1929	Pointed Heels	Lora Nixon	
1930	Behind the Make-Up	Marie Gardoni	
1930	Paramount on Parade	Sweetheart	
1930	The Texan	Consuelo	
1930	The Border Legion	Joan Randall	
1930	The Sea God	Daisy	
1930	The Honeymoon	Mitzi	Unreleased
1930	Captain Thunder	Ynez Domínguez	
1931	Dirigible	Helen Pierce	
1931	The Conquering Horde	Taisie Lockhart	
1931	Not Exactly Gentlemen	Lee Carleton	
1931	The Finger Points	Marcia Collins	
1931	The Lawyer's Secret	Kay Roberts	
1931	The Unholy Garden	Camille de Jonghe	
1932	Stowaway	Mary Foster	
1932	Doctor X	Joanne Xavier	
1932	The Most Dangerous Game	Eve Trowbridge	
1933	The Vampire Bat	Ruth Bertin	
1933	Mystery of the Wax Museum	Charlotte Duncan	
1933	King Kong	Ann Darrow	
1933	Below the Sea	Diana Templeton	
1933	Ann Carver's Profession	Ann Carver Graham	
1933	The Woman I Stole	Vida Carew	
1933	Shanghai Madness	Wildeth Christie	
1933	The Big Brain	Cynthia Glennon	
1933	One Sunday Afternoon	Virginia Brush	
1933	The Bowery	Lucy Calhoun	
1933	Master of Men	Kay Walling	
1934	Madame Spy	Marie Franck	
1934	The Countess of Monte Cristo	Janet Krueger	
1934	Once to Every Woman	Mary Fanshane	
1934	Viva Villa!	Teresa de Castillo	
1934	Black Moon	Gail Hamilton	
1934	The Affairs of Cellini	Angela	
1934	The Richest Girl in the World	Sylvia Lockwood	
1934	Cheating Cheaters	Nan Brockton	
1934	Woman in the Dark	Louise Loring	
1934	Mills of the Gods	Jean Hastings	
1935	The Clairvoyant	Rene	US title: The Evil Mind
1935	Bulldog Jack	Ann Manders	
1935	Come Out of the Pantry	Hilda Beach-Howard	
1935	White Lies	Joan Mitchell	
1936	When Knights Were Bold	Lady Rowena	
1936	Roaming Lady	Joyce Reid	
1936	They Met in a Taxi	Mary Trenton	
1937	It Happened in Hollywood	Gloria Gay	
1937	Murder in Greenwich Village	Kay Cabot	
1938	The Jury's Secret	Linda Ware	
1938	Smashing the Spy Ring	Eleanor Dunlap	
1939	Navy Secrets	Carol Evans/Agent Matthews	
1940	Wildcat Bus	Ted Dawson	
1941	Adam Had Four Sons	Molly Stoddard	
1941	Melody for Three	Mary Stanley	
1942	Not a Ladies' Man	Hester Hunter	
1953	Treasure of the Golden Condor	Marquise Annette de St. Malo	
1953	Small Town Girl	Mrs. Kimbell	
1955	The Cobweb	Edna Devanal	
1955	Queen Bee	Sue McKinnon	
1956	Hell on Frisco Bay	Kay Stanley	
1956	Rock, Pretty Baby	Beth Daley	
1957	Crime of Passion	Alice Pope	
1957	Tammy and the Bachelor	Mrs. Brent	
1958	Summer Love	Beth Daley	
1958	Dragstrip Riot	Norma Martin	
1980	Gideon's Trumpet	Edna Curtis	

=== Short subjects ===
Year	Title	Role	Notes
1923	Gasoline Love		
1923	Speed Bugs		
1924	Just A Good Guy	Girl Getting Into Car	
1925	Sure-Mike	Salesgirl at Department Store	
1925	What Price Goofy	Concerned Girl with Perfume	Uncredited
1925	Isn't Life Terrible?	Potential Pen Buyer	Uncredited
1925	Thundering Landlords	The Wife	
1925	Chasing the Chaser	Nursemaid	
1925	Madame Sans Jane	The Girl	
1925	No Father to Guide Him	Beach House Cashier	Uncredited
1925	Unfriendly Enemies	The Girl	
1925	Your Own Back Yard	Woman in Quarrelsome Couple	
1925	Moonlight and Noses	Miss Sniff	
1925	Should Sailors Marry?	Herself	
1926	WAMPAS Baby Stars of 1926	Herself	
1926	One Wild Time		
1926	Don Key (A Son of a Burro)		
1926	Don't Shoot	Nancy Burton	
1926	The Saddle Tramp		
1926	The Show Cowpuncher		
1927	A Trip Through the Paramount Studio	Herself	
1931	The Slippery Pearls	Herself	
1932	Hollywood on Parade	Herself	

=== Partial television credits ===
Year	Title	Role	Notes
1953	Cavalcade of America	Varina Davis	Episode: "One Nation Indivisible"
1953-1954	The Pride of the Family	Catherine Morrison	27 episodes
1958	Alfred Hitchcock Presents	Mrs. Renshaw	Episode: "Dip in the Pool"
1959	Playhouse 90	Tula Marsh	Episode: "The Second Happiest Day"
1959	Alfred Hitchcock Presents	Mrs. Nelson	Episode: "The Morning After"
1962	Wagon Train	Mrs. Edwards	Episode: "The Cole Crawford Story"
1964	The Eleventh Hour	Mrs. Brubaker	Episode: "You're So Smart, Why Can't You Be Good?"
1965	Bob Hope Presents the Chrysler Theatre	Mrs. White	Episode: "Double Jeopardy"
1965	Perry Mason	Mignon Germaine	Episode: "The Case of the Fatal Fetish"

== Bibliography ==
- Angela is Twenty-Two (1938). Play written with Sinclair Lewis.
- Wray, Fay (1989). On the Other Hand: A Life Story. St. Martin's Press. ISBN 978-0-312-02265-5.

== See also ==
- Canadian pioneers in early Hollywood
