= Loco Luck =

1927 film

- Scenes from the film
- Directed by: Clifford Smith
- Screenplay by: Doris Malloy; Isadore Bernstein
- Story by: Alan James
- Starring: Art Acord; Fay Wray; Aggie Herring; William Steele; Al Jennings; George F. Marion
- Cinematography: Edward Linden
- Production company: Universal Pictures
- Distributed by: Universal Pictures
- Release date: January 23, 1927
- Running time: 50 minutes
- Country: United States
- Languages: Silent; English intertitles

Loco Luck is a 1927 American silent Western film directed by Clifford Smith and written by Doris Malloy and Isadore Bernstein. The film stars Art Acord, Fay Wray, Aggie Herring, William Steele, Al Jennings and George F. Marion. The film was released on January 23, 1927, by Universal Pictures.

== Cast ==
- Art Acord as Bud Harris
- Fay Wray as Molly Vernon
- Aggie Herring as Mrs. Vernon
- William Steele as Frank Lambert
- Al Jennings as Bush
- George F. Marion as 'Dad' Perkins
- M.E. Stimson as Mark Randall
- George Grandee as Jesse Turner
- Art Mix as Bush Henchman
- Buddy the Horse as Buddy
