= Lazy Lightning =

1926 film

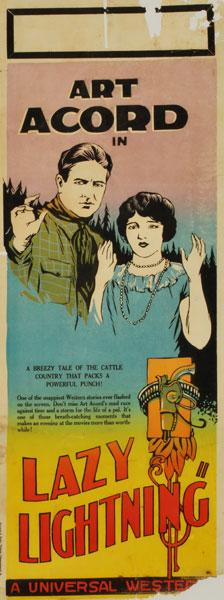
- Theatrical poster
- Directed by: William Wyler
- Written by: Harrison Jacobs
- Starring: Art Acord; Fay Wray; Robert Gordon
- Cinematography: Edward Linden
- Production company: Universal Pictures
- Distributed by: Universal Pictures
- Release date: December 12, 1926
- Running time: 50 minutes
- Country: United States
- Language: Silent (English intertitles)

Lazy Lightning is a 1926 American silent Western film directed by William Wyler and starring Art Acord, Fay Wray, and Robert Gordon.

== Plot ==
As described in a film magazine, Lance Lighton, a lazy wanderer, is arrested for vagrancy and taken by the sheriff to the Rogers Ranch. Dickie Rogers, an invalid child who has never walked, takes a liking to the stranger who is allowed to remain to do odd jobs and to entertain the boy. An old man who is hard of hearing mistakes Lighton for "Lightning" and the nickname sticks. Uncle Henry, heir to Dickie's share of the estate in the event of the latter's death, has been systematically cheated at cards by Bill Harvey, who now demands his money, using dire threats. Fearing a penitentiary sentence, Uncle Henry sees Dickie rolling helplessly in his wheel chair towards a cliff and does nothing to save him. Lazy Lightning saves the boy's life and the uncle covers himself by pretending to have sprained his ankle. Following the fright, the boy weakens and is close to death. The doctor thinks he can save him with serum. Uncle Henry goes in the car to get the serum. Mistrusting him, Lazy follows him to town on horseback through a driving rainstorm. Henry gets the last bit of serum from the druggist and then confides to Bill that the little bottle is all that stands between him and his fortune. While the two are gloating over their luck, Lazy, who has seen the car outside Harvey's place, peers through the window. He enters and fights Harvey and Henry, carrying back the serum that saves the boy's life and wins the love of his sister Lila. An operation brings about the healing of Dickie's limbs in time for the wedding of Lila and Lazy.

== Cast ==
- Art Acord as Lance Lighton
- Fay Wray as Lila Rogers
- Robert Gordon as Dickie Rogers
- Vin Moore as Sheriff Dan Boyd
- Arthur Morrison as Henry S. Rogers
- George B. French as Dr. Hull
- Rex De Rosselli as William Harvey
- Janet Gaynor (uncredited)
