= The Terror (1926 film) =

1926 film

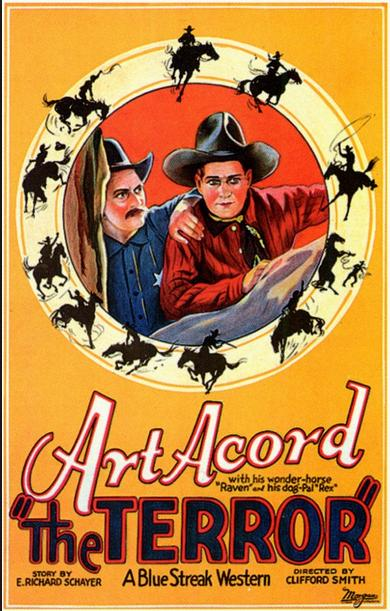
- Film poster
- Directed by: Clifford Smith
- Written by: E. Richard Schayer
- Produced by: Carl Laemmle
- Starring: Art Acord
- Cinematography: Edward Linden
- Distributed by: Universal Pictures
- Release date: July 25, 1926
- Running time: 5 reels
- Country: United States
- Language: Silent (English intertitles)

The Terror is a 1926 American silent Western film directed by Clifford Smith and starring Art Acord. It was produced and distributed by Universal Pictures.

== Plot ==
As described in a film magazine, cattle ranchers meet in Red Bluff due to recent cattle raids, with Pop Morton losing the most. While he is being sworn in as a deputy, his daughter Molly is being eyed covetously by Blair Hatley, who holds a mortgage on her father's ranch. When Blair speaks to her of marriage, she runs off to the ranch cook, who is watching a stranger with a smart horse doing rope tricks. Steve Baird, a henchman of Blair, believes he recognizes the stranger as The Terror, an outlaw from Arizona, but the stranger gives him a baleful stare. On orders from Blair, Steve and Blair's brother Jim, who heads the rustlers, kidnap Molly and take her to their hideout in the hills. Tracked by The Terror, he boldly goes to the hideout and demands food, which is served by Molly. She passes him a note asking to be saved, and the stranger suddenly grabs her and exits, jumping on his horse and getting away to the forest. Meanwhile, Pop Morton and his men have been searching for her, and they find her in a mountain shack guarded by a dog. Returning to the ranch, they are captured by the Hatley gang, but the stranger with a posse comes to their rescue. Molly is ready to marry the stranger whether he is an outlaw or not, but he turns out to be a Texas Ranger and the question of a wedding is resolved.

== Cast ==
- Art Acord as Art Downs/The Terror
- Velma Connor as Molly Morton
- Dudley Hendricks as Pop Morton
- C. E. Anderson as Blair Hatley
- Edmund Cobb as Jim Hatley
- Jess Deffenbach as Steve Baird
- Hank Bell as Sheriff
- Rex the Dog as Rex
- Raven the Horse as Buddie

== Preservation ==
A print of The Terror is preserved on 16 mm.
