= A Christmas Revenge =

Lost 1915 American silent Western and Christmas film

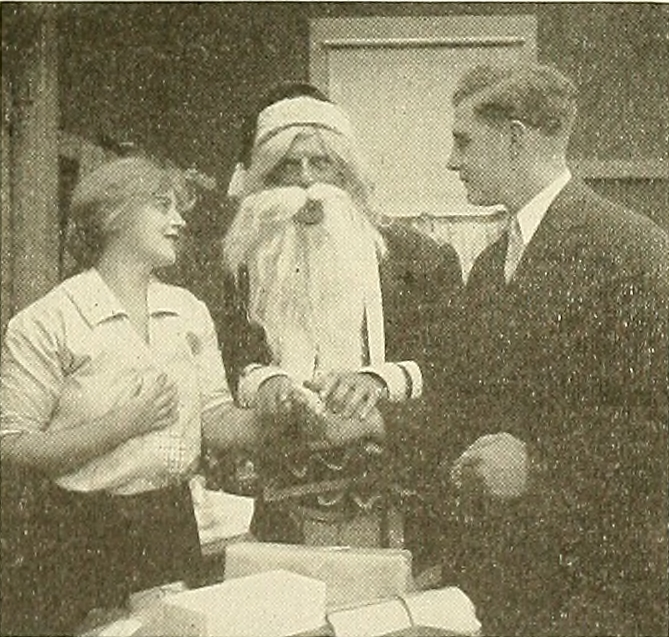
- Marguerite Clayton, Broncho Billy and Lloyd Bacon
- Directed by: Gilbert M. Anderson
- Written by: O. Henry
- Starring: Marguerite Clayton; Broncho Billy Anderson; Lloyd Bacon
- Production company: Essanay Studios
- Distributed by: General Film Company
- Release date: December 18, 1915
- Running time: 2 reels
- Country: United States
- Language: Silent (English intertitles)

A Christmas Revenge is a lost 1915 American silent short western drama film directed by Gilbert M. Anderson and produced by Essanay Studios. Anderson also stars as Broncho Billy.

== Plot ==
A stranger is in town and he has won over a local teacher who used to be Broncho Billy's girl. On the day of the wedding, Billy shoots the groom, injuring him. Now on the run from the law, Billy leaves a message, saying that he will kill the groom on Christmas Day. At Christmas he returns and using a Santa Claus costume gets into the church. At the last moment, he decides not to harm the groom as a Christmas present to his former lover.

== Cast ==
- Gilbert M. Anderson as Broncho Billy
- Marguerite Clayton as His Sweetheart
- Lloyd Bacon as His Rival
- Ben Turpin as Loafer
- Harry Todd as Deacon

== Background ==
The film is an adaptation of the short story "A Chaparral Christmas Gift" by the American writer O. Henry. The original was published in 1910 with 23 other short stories in the collection Whirligigs.
