= Sky High Corral =

1926 film

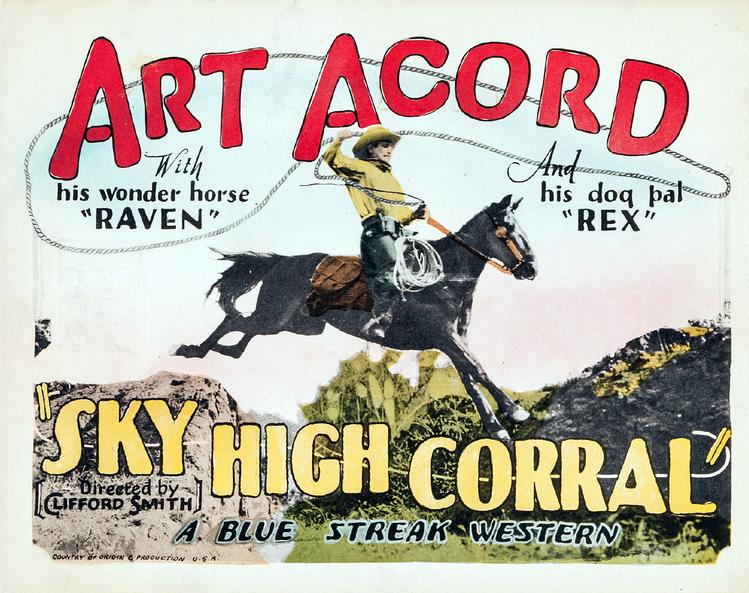
- Directed by: Clifford Smith
- Written by: Ralph Cummins; Clifford Smith
- Produced by: Carl Laemmle
- Starring: Art Acord; Marguerite Clayton; Duke R. Lee
- Cinematography: Edward Linden
- Production company: Universal Pictures
- Distributed by: Universal Pictures
- Release date: February 28, 1926
- Running time: 5 reels
- Country: United States
- Language: Silent (English intertitles)

Sky High Corral is a 1926 American silent Western film directed by Clifford Smith and starring Art Acord, Marguerite Clayton, and Duke R. Lee.

The film is extant.

== Plot ==
As described in a film magazine review, after the federal government declares a certain tract of land a game preserve, rancher Bill Hayden and his daughter Shasta are set to be evicted. Forest ranger Jack McCabe falls in love with Shasta. Hayden's secret enemy, Whitey Durk, steals Hayden's cattle and tells him that the rangers are responsible. Jack saves both Hayden and his daughter from Durk's men. The criminals are finally rounded up and the law establishing the game preserve is repealed. Shasta confesses her love for McCabe.

== Cast ==
- Art Acord as Jack McCabe
- Marguerite Clayton as Shasta Hayden
- Duke R. Lee as Whitey Durh
- Jack Mower as Burns
- Thomas G. Lingham as Bill Hayden
- Blackie Thompson as Gregg
- Missouri Royer as Slim
- Floyd Shackelford as Sam

== Bibliography ==
- Munden, Kenneth White. The American Film Institute Catalog of Motion Pictures Produced in the United States, Part 1. University of California Press, 1997. ISBN 9780520209695
