= Edythe Sterling =

American actress

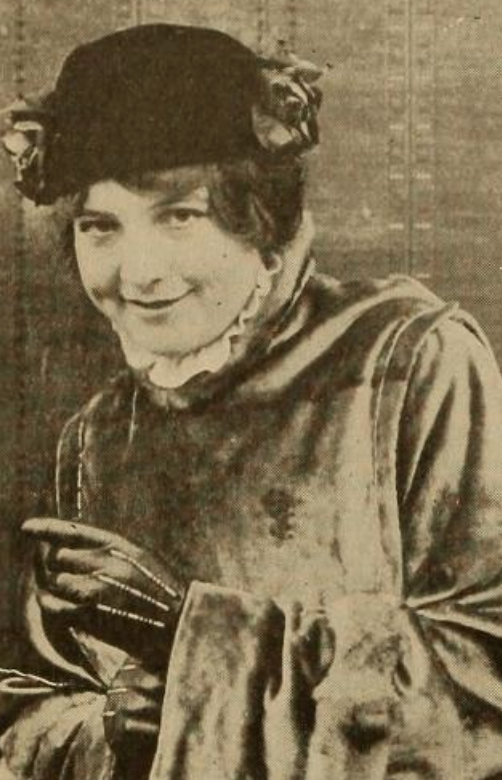
- Edythe Sterling, from a 1916 publication
- Born: Edith May Kessinger; October 1893; Leavenworth, Kansas
- Died: June 5, 1962 (age 68); Los Angeles, California
- Other names: Edythe Acord, Edythe Sterling-Billingsley, Edythe Younger
- Occupation: Actress
- Spouse(s): Art Acord, Milo Billingsley, Clifford L. Younger

Edythe Sterling (October 1893 – June 5, 1962), born Edith May Kessinger, was an American actress, stunt rider, and producer in silent films, mainly Westerns.

== Early life and education ==
Edith May Kessinger was born in Leavenworth, Kansas, the daughter of John Letcher Kessinger and Nettie Ryherd Kessinger. She left Kansas at age 15, to seek a career on the stage.

== Career ==
Sterling appeared in dozens of silent films from 1913 to 1923, many of them shorts or westerns, including The Girl from Texas (1914), A Cattle Queen's Romance (1915), The Ghost Wagon (1915), The Secret Man (1917) with Harry Carey, The Arizona Cat Claw (1919), The One-Way Trail (1919), Call of the West (1920), The Cowboy's Sweetheart (1920), The Fiddler of the Little Big Horn (1920), The Stranger of Canyon Valley (1922), Crimson Gold (1923) and Danger (1923).

Sterling had her own production company, and often had very active roles in her films, riding, fighting, shooting, and working with large animals. For example, in The Girl Who Dared (1920), she plays a sheriff in a western town, battling cattle rustlers. In The One-Way Trail (1919), she rescues her male co-star. In another picture, Nancy's Birthright (1916), her title character struggles to overcome inherited "criminal tendencies".

After her screen career ended, Sterling turned to live performances of riding stunts, for example in a "wild west" show in Los Angeles in 1923, and a vaudeville act in 1924. She also served a short jail sentence in Pasadena in 1923, for speeding and contempt of court. She toured as director and "interpreter" for a band of Hopi dancers from 1926 into the 1930s. She traveled with a pet Arizona kit fox on these tours.

== Personal life ==
Sterling married fellow actor Art Acord in 1913; they divorced in 1919. In 1920 and 1921, there was a scandal when she and her married manager, L. T. Osborne, presented themselves as a married couple while traveling. In 1926 she married Milo William Billingsley, a theatrical producer; they later divorced. Her last husband was Clifford L. Younger. She died in 1962, at the age of 68, in Los Angeles, California. Her grave is in Valhalla Memorial Park in North Hollywood.
