= The Curse of Drink =

1922 film

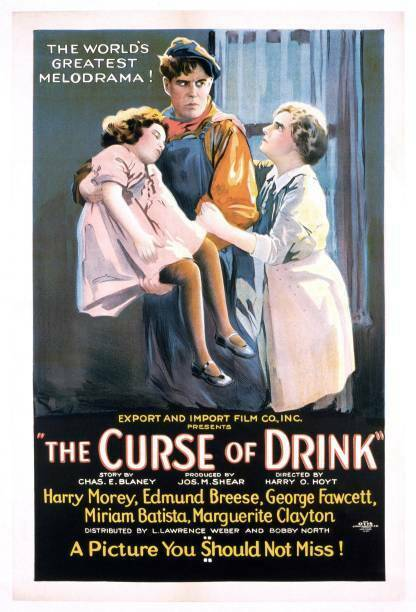
- Directed by: Harry O. Hoyt
- Written by: Harry O. Hoyt
- Based on: The Curse of Drink by Charles E. Blaney
- Starring: Harry T. Morey; Edmund Breese; Marguerite Clayton
- Cinematography: Harry Fischbeck
- Production companies: Weber & North Productions
- Release date: October 1922
- Running time: 60 minutes
- Country: United States
- Languages: Silent; English intertitles

The Curse of Drink is a 1922 American silent drama film directed by Harry O. Hoyt and starring Harry T. Morey, Edmund Breese and Marguerite Clayton. It is based on the 1904 play The Curse of Drink by Charles E. Blaney.

== Plot ==
A former top railroad engineer succumbs to an addiction to bootleg liquor with unfortunate consequences for himself and his stenographer daughter.

== Cast ==
- Harry T. Morey as Bill Sanford
- Edmund Breese as John Rand
- Marguerite Clayton as Ruth Sanford
- George Fawcett as Ben Flartey
- Miriam Battista as Baby Betty
- Brinsley Shaw as Sam Handy
- Alice May as Mother Sanford
- Albert L. Barrett as Harry Rand
- June Fuller as Margaret Sanford

== Bibliography ==
- Munden, Kenneth White. The American Film Institute Catalog of Motion Pictures Produced in the United States, Part 1. University of California Press, 1997.
