= The Female Highwayman =

1906 film

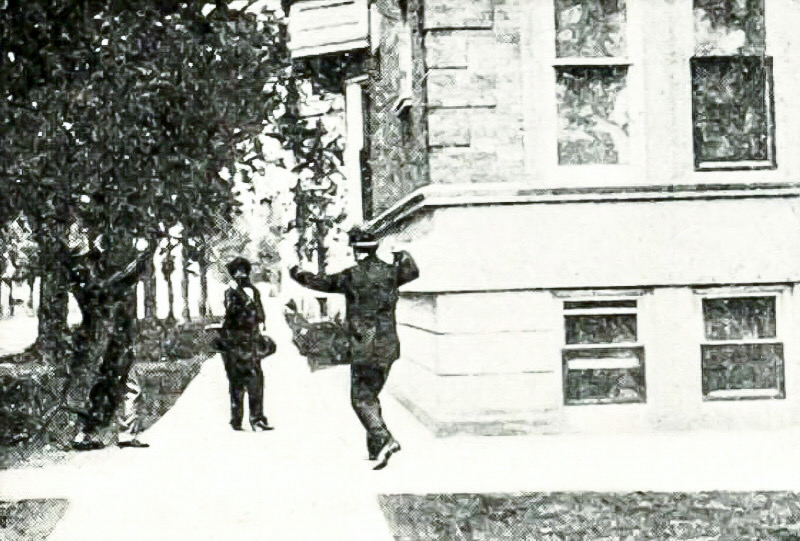
- Film still of the female bandit (center figure), dressed as a man and aiming her pistol at a police officer
- Directed by: Gilbert M. "Broncho Billy" Anderson
- Produced by: William Selig
- Production companies: Selig Polyscope Company; Chicago, Illinois
- Release date: November 24, 1906
- Running time: 910 feet (approximately 14 minutes)
- Country: United States
- Language: Silent (English intertitles)

The Female Highwayman (also cited as Female Highwayman) is a lost 1906 American silent crime film. Produced in Chicago by Selig Polyscope Company, the motion picture was directed by Gilbert "Broncho Billy" Anderson. It was among some Selig pictures in this early period of the silent era when the studio's actresses performed in men's attire or carried out "roles often associated with masculine behavior." After this production's release, one film distributor in 1908 described it as a portrayal of "The escapades of a young woman who has unfortunately directed her great abilities to a course of criminal theft." The story itself portrayed the female bandit committing four crimes, three of which were done while she was dressed as a man.

== Cast ==
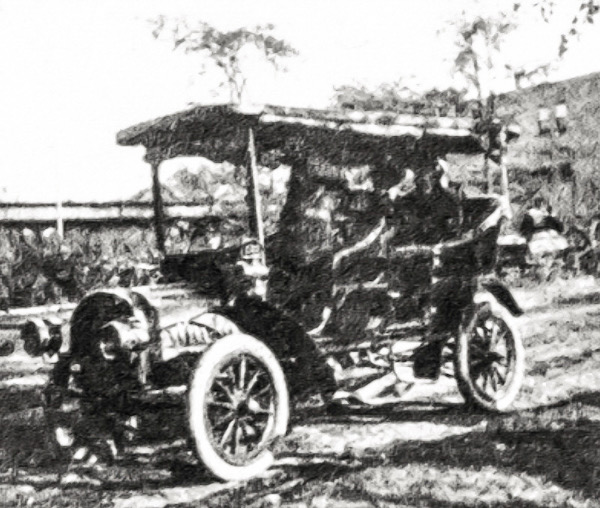
Still of the car highjacked by the female bandit

- Margaret Leslie in unverified role (very likely as the title character)
- Howard E. Nicholas in unverified role
- Uncredited actors as party guests and maid
- Uncredited actor as jewelry store clerk
- Uncredited actors as occupants of highjacked car
- Uncredited actor as police officer
- Uncredited actor as bank courier
- Uncredited actors as additional police officers

== Plot ==
According to descriptions of the film's storyline in 1906 and 1907 publications, the Selig release portrayed four crimes of a young woman in a big city. The first scenes depicted her "daring" and "carefully mapped out robbery" of guests at a posh party, including taking jewelry and cash from her own friends. Profiles of the film also describe how her next target was a jewelry store, where she employed a more subtle means of theft. While inspecting a tray of diamonds with the store's clerk, she slips a large gem out of the tray and embeds it in a wad of chewing gum she took out of her mouth. She then sticks the diamond under the ledge of the sales counter. As she departs the store, the clerk notices the jewel was missing, so he stops her and calls in a police officer, who searches the thief. No gem is found, so the clever thief is allowed to leave. Later, dressed as a man, she returns to the store pretending to be a customer interested in buying a new pocket watch. While casually inspecting merchandise, she retrieves the diamond from beneath the counter's edge.

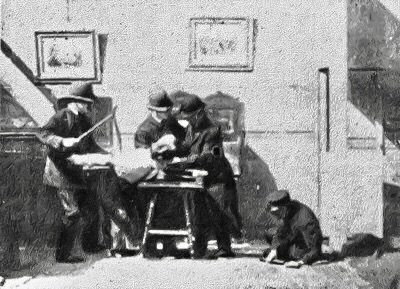
Scene of the police restraining the robber as a wounded officer (right) lies on the floor

In the female bandit's next crime, again dressed as a man and brandishing a pistol, she "highjacks" a car and robs its occupants. She then uses the gun to rob a bank courier. Yet again attired in men's clothing, the "highwayman" confronts the courier on a sidewalk and takes a valise full of valuables. When a policeman approaches during the robbery, she turns her gun on him and holds both men "at bay" while she makes her escape, although in her getaway she drops her male "wig", which the authorities quickly find. The film then transitioned to the final scenes in which the bandit has returned to her apartment. Thinking she has successfully eluded her pursuers and is safe, she proceeds to hide the valuables when suddenly several police officers batter down the door to her room. She shoots one of the men, severely wounding him. A struggle ensues, but the bandit still manages to drink a vial of poison she had hidden. She dies, preferring to end her life rather than languishing for decades in a prison cell.

== Production ==
The production was filmed entirely in Chicago by Selig Polyscope in the fall of 1906, prior to mid-October. Scenes were shot on location along several streets of the city as well as at the company's studio and backlot, which occupied a large area near 3900 North Claremont Avenue. The company's owner, William N. Selig, viewed the 14-minute film as a landmark "feature" for the studio, being its longest screen presentation up to that time. He subsequently referred to it as the company's first "release of 1,000 feet". Technically, though, the film was shy 90 feet from actually setting that landmark. Upon its release in 1906 and throughout its circulation to theaters into 1908, The Female Highwayman was consistently listed in trade publications and offered for sale by film distributors as a picture with a running length of 910 feet.

=== A post-production murder ===
The cast in The Female Highwayman was not credited in available 1906 or 1907 trade publication and newspapers, an omission that was not uncommon in the early silent era, when screen celebrity in the United States and performance attributions on screen had not yet become entrenched or customary in the young motion-picture industry. Actress Margaret Leslie and part-time actor and theatrical agent Howard E. Nicholas are documented being in the film, but their roles are not specifically identified. Nevertheless, Leslie by October 1906 was an established stage and screen performer who had already been cast in several Selig productions before being in The Female Highwayman, so it is likely she portrayed the title character.

On October 17, 1906, shortly after completing production on The Female Highwayman, Margaret Leslie was murdered in her room at the Palace Hotel in Chicago. Her fellow actor in the film, Howard Nicholas, and an accomplice robbed the actress of her jewelry. In the process of the crime, Nicholas choked and killed Leslie. The men were soon caught by authorities, tried, and sent to prison, with Nicholas receiving a life sentence. While newspapers reported the crime in 1906 and followed the trial in late March and early April 1907, trade publications at the time do not mention the case at all or even refer to Leslie in any references to or notices about The Female Highwayman.

== Release and reception ==
On December 3, 1906, just nine days after the film's release, the local newspaper in Hartford, Connecticut, reports on the town's first screening of the unusual crime drama from out "of the West" in Chicago:

Hold-ups and robberies in the mountains of the West, all committed by a woman, were shown in the feature film "The Female Highwayman," in the series of motion pictures given before a large audience at the Hartford Opera House last evening. The film is new and the scenes shown were clear.

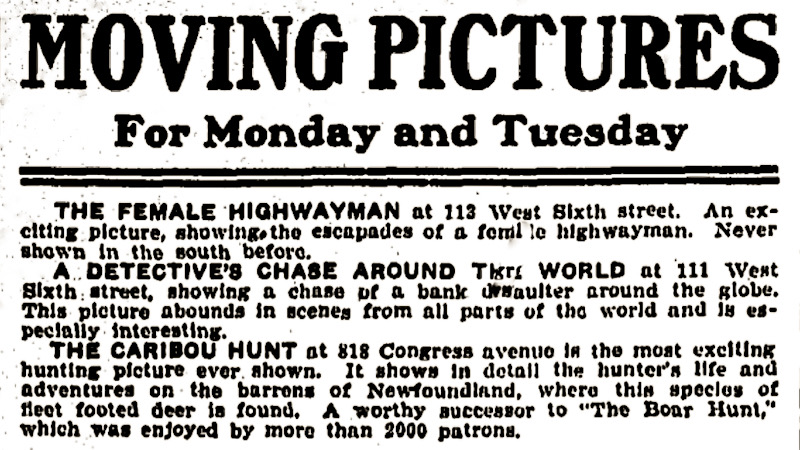
"Never shown in the south before"; newspaper advertisement, Austin, Texas, June 1907

Nearly two years after the film's initial distribution, media coverage of The Female Highwayman indicates that Selig's "lengthy" production remained in circulation in United States theaters and was still a motion picture of interest to trade publications. The New York-based journal The Moving Picture World continued to update its readers about reactions to the Selig production in a feature titled "Newspaper Comments on Film Subjects". In its August 29, 1908 issue, the journal reports a pithy assessment from another recent viewer, stating only "'The Female Highwayman' is an intensely interesting picture." In 1908, film distributors also continued to promote the film, describing it as "praiseworthy not only for its dramatic interest and intensity, but as well for the wonderful photography and steadiness, which are excellent throughout."

=== Trouble for the film in Chicago's "nickel theaters" ===
Following its release, The Female Highwayman was added to a list of films compiled by Chicago Judge McKenzie Cleland in April 1907, a list of motion pictures presented in the city's "nickel theaters", which he collectively and publicly blamed for corrupting local youth. The film industry took notice of the judge's "war" against Chicago's "cheap" theaters, as well as the proceedings of a "conference on 5 cent theaters" convened by city leaders that April to discuss the problematic pictures. The Selig Polyscope Company no doubt took particular notice of that conference. The "Windy City" was not only the home of its studio operations, but having its recent "lengthy" feature included on Judge Cleland's list was certainly not good for the company's public image, at least locally. The New York trade journal The Moving Picture World in its April 27 issue reports on the campaign by "McCleland" and even admits that the films on the judge's list are not really suitable for young audiences:

Judge McCleland, of Chicago, is making war on moving picture shows of the nickel variety. Writing to a Chicago paper he says: "These theatres are the cause, directly and indirectly, of more juvenile coming into my court than all other causes combined. I very much hope you will not cease to encourage the suppression of these institutions, or at least the prevention of minors attending them unless accompanied by their parents." That looks like a rather stern arraignment of a popular amusement, but possibly the judge is speaking inside the facts. At least, one is willing to admit that their effect may be somewhat different from that of the Sunday school, when he reads over the list of the films shown in Chicago last Saturday... Surely not...the kind of selections the average parent would make for his or her little ones.

In addition to The Female Highwayman, some of the other films included on Judge Cleland's 1907 list were Cupid's Barometer, An Old Man’s Darling, The Bigamist, Modern Brigandage, Course of True Love, Seaside Flirtation, College Boy’s First Love, Child Robbers, Gentlemanly Hold-up, Beware, My Husband Comes, and Gaieties of Divorce.

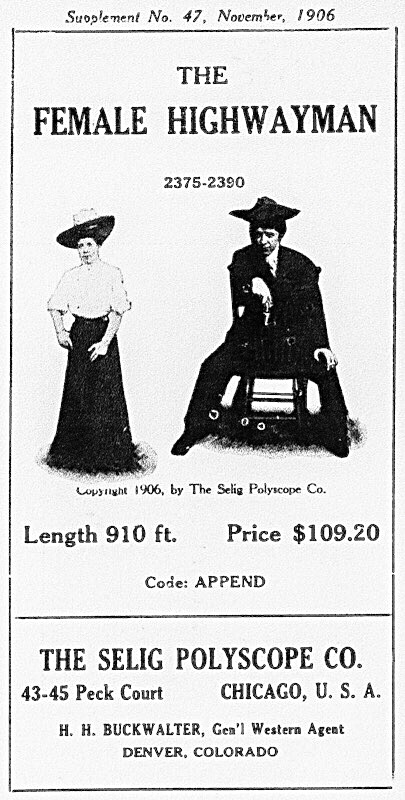
Selig bulletin with female bandit posing in dress and in a man's suit, November 1906

=== Prices for the film, 1906-1908 ===
In the months and years after the film's release, various licensed distributors and independent motion-picture wholesalers offered to rent to the general public and sell to theaters copies of the film. L. Hetz, a business located at 302 East 23rd Street in Brooklyn, New York, offered in October 1907 full copies of The Female Highwayman, presumably rental copies, for the low price of $27 ($933 USD today). Purchased copies were far more expensive. Both Selig and its licensed distributors were still offering the 14-minute film in 1908 for the same specific price advertised at the time of its release in November 1906: $109.20 ($3,913 today).

== The film's "lost" status ==
No copy of The Female Highwayman is listed among the film holdings of the Library of Congress, the UCLA Film Archives, in the collection of moving images at the Museum of Modern Art, the George Eastman Museum, the Library and Archives Canada (LAC), or in other major film repositories in the United States, Canada, or Europe. The motion picture is therefore classified as lost or "undetermined" by film historians.
