= Broncho Billy Anderson =

American actor, writer, film director, and producer (1880–1971)

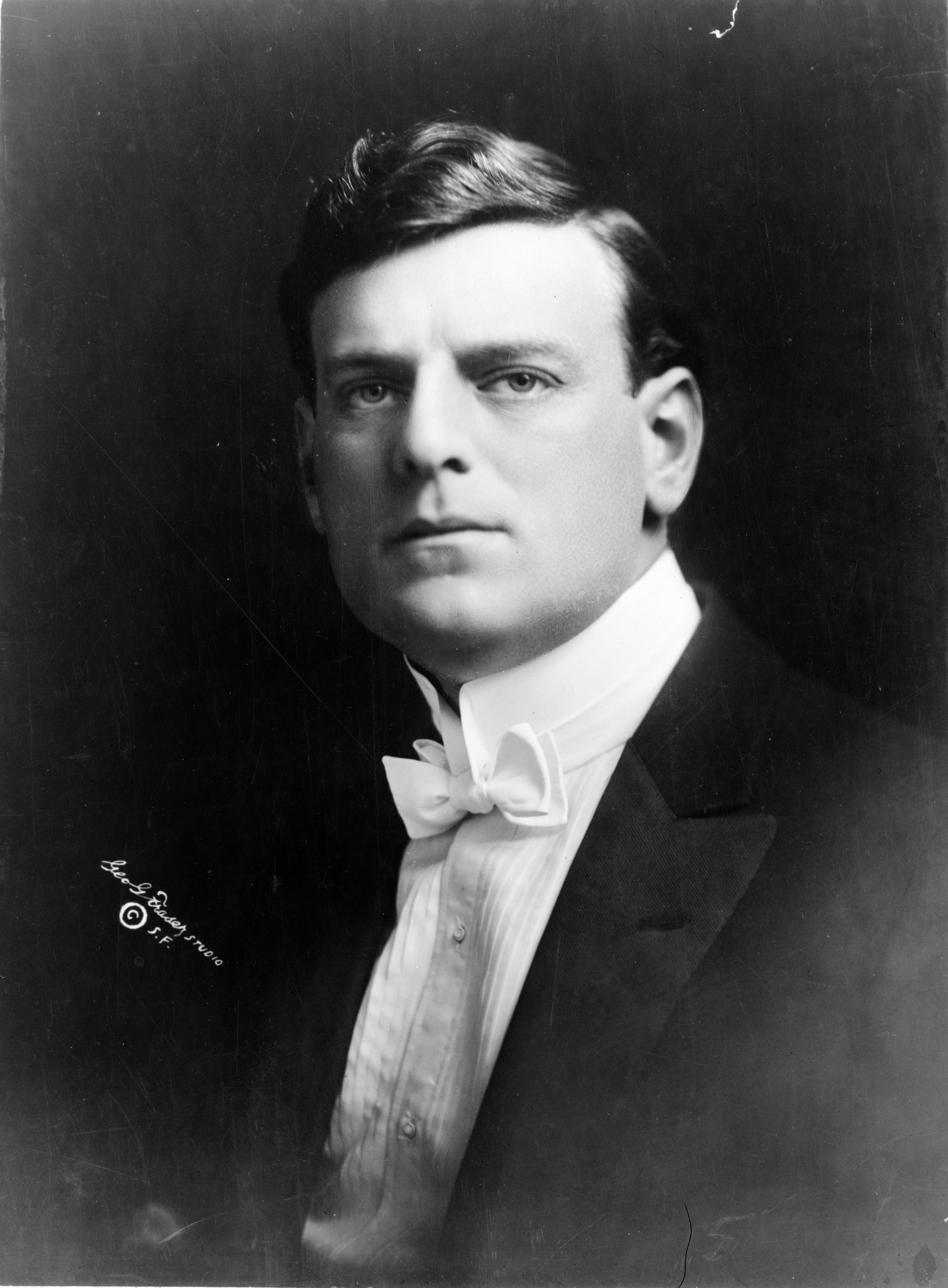
- Anderson c. 1913
- Born: Maxwell Henry Aronson; March 21, 1880; Little Rock, Arkansas, U.S.
- Died: January 20, 1971 (aged 90); South Pasadena, California, U.S.
- Resting place: Chapel of the Pines Crematory, Los Angeles, California, U.S.
- Other name: Gilbert M. Anderson
- Occupations: Actor; director; producer; writer; co-founder, Essanay Studios
- Years active: 1903–1965
- Spouse: Mollie Louise Schabbleman (m. 1910)
- Children: 1
- Relatives: Leona Anderson (sister)

Gilbert M. "Broncho Billy" Anderson (born Maxwell Henry Aronson; March 21, 1880 – January 20, 1971) was an American actor, writer, film director, and film producer, who was the first star of the Western film genre. He was a founder and star for Essanay studios. In 1958, he received a special Academy Award for being a pioneer of the film industry.

== Early life ==
Anderson was born Maxwell Henry Aronson in Little Rock, Arkansas, the sixth child of Henry and Esther (Ash) Aronson, both natives of New York. His younger sister was actress and singer Leona Anderson. His family was Jewish, his father's parents having emigrated to the United States from Prussia, and his mother's from the Russian Empire. His family moved to Pine Bluff, Arkansas when he was three years old. He lived in Pine Bluff until he was 8, when he moved with his family to St. Louis, Missouri. When he was 18, he moved to New York City and appeared in vaudeville and the theater, supplementing his income as a photographer's model and newspaper vendor. In 1903, he met Edwin S. Porter, who hired him as an actor and occasional script collaborator.

== Film ==
Anderson played the dancing tenderfoot and the train passenger who gets shot and bandit #1 in The Great Train Robbery (1903). Seeing the film for the first time at a vaudeville theater and being overwhelmed by the audience's reaction, he decided to work in the film industry exclusively. He began to write, direct, and act in his own Westerns under the name Gilbert M. Anderson.

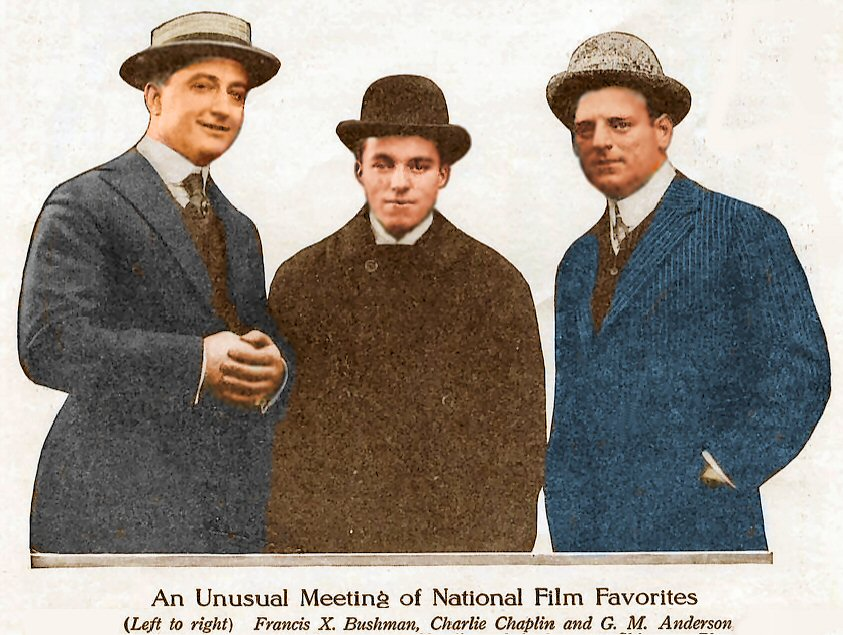
Francis X. Bushman, Charlie Chaplin and Anderson, photo taken at the Essanay Studio, Chicago in 1915

In 1907 in Chicago, Anderson and George Kirke Spoor founded Essanay Studios ("S and A" for Spoor and Anderson), one of the major early movie studios. In 1909, he directed the film with the first known instance of the pie-the-face gag, Mr. Flip. Anderson acted in over 300 short films. He played a wide variety of characters, but he gained enormous popularity from a series of 148 silent Western shorts and was the first film cowboy star, "Broncho Billy." Many of these were shot in Niles, a small town in Alameda County, California, south-east of San Francisco, where the nearby Western Pacific Railroad route through Niles Canyon proved to be a very suitable location for the filming of Westerns.

Writing, acting, and directing most of these movies, Anderson also found time to direct a series of "Alkali Ike" comedy Westerns starring Augustus Carney. In 1916, Anderson sold his ownership in Essanay and retired from acting. He returned to New York City, bought the Longacre Theatre and produced plays, but without permanent success. He then made a brief comeback as a producer with a series of shorts with Stan Laurel, including his first work with Oliver Hardy in A Lucky Dog (filmed in 1919, released in 1921). After a series of failures as a Broadway producer, he retired again after 1920, this time permanently.

Anderson sued Paramount Pictures for naming a character "Bronco Billy" in Star Spangled Rhythm (1943) and for depicting the character as a "washed-up and broken-down actor," which he felt reflected badly on him. He asked for $900,000, but the outcome of the suit is unknown.

In 1958, Anderson received an Honorary Academy Award as a "motion picture pioneer" for his "contributions to the development of motion pictures as entertainment."

At age 85, Anderson came out of retirement for a cameo role in The Bounty Killer (1965).

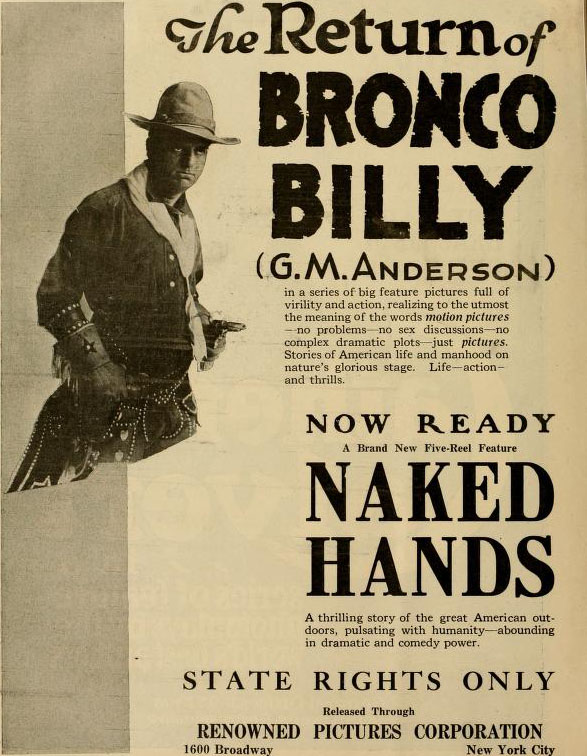
Naked Hands, 1918

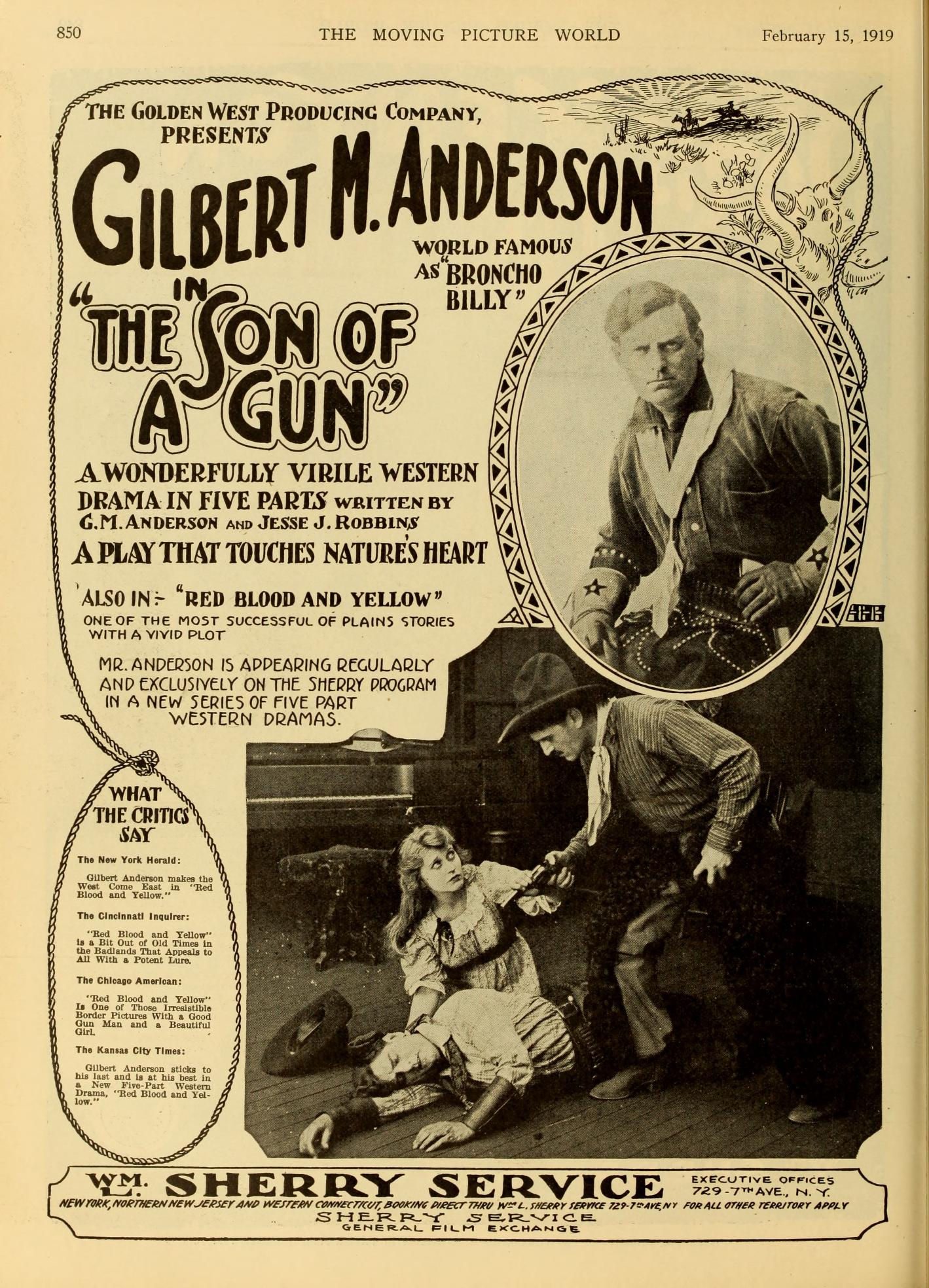
The Son of a Gun, 1919

== Personal life and death ==
For the last years of his life, Anderson lived at the Motion Picture & Television Country House and Hospital in Woodland Hills, California. In his later years, his legs were paralyzed as the result of a back injury that occurred while he was making a film.

He died of a heart attack in 1971 at the age of 90, at a Braewood sanitarium in South Pasadena, California.

He was cremated, his ashes previously went placed at the Chapel of the Pines vault that was not accessible to the public.

== Legacy ==
In 1918, Albert Levering drew a celebrity comic, Broncho Billy, based on the Hollywood western star.

Anderson was honored posthumously in 1998 with his image on a U.S. postage stamp. In 2002, he was inducted into the Western Performers Hall of Fame at the National Cowboy & Western Heritage Museum in Oklahoma City, Oklahoma. For the past nine years, Niles (now part of Fremont), California, site of the western Essanay Studios, has held an annual "Broncho Billy Silent Film Festival."

Anderson has a motion pictures star on the Hollywood Walk of Fame at 1651 Vine Street in Hollywood.

A Chicago Park District park, not far from the site of the Chicago Essanay Studio lot, was named Broncho Billy Park in his honor.

On March 21, 2018, a historical roadside marker was dedicated in Little Rock, Arkansas, across the street from his birthplace, 713 Center Street. The marker was donated by the Jewish American Society for Historic Preservation in cooperation with the Niles Essanay Silent Film Museum and Little Rock's First United Methodist Church.

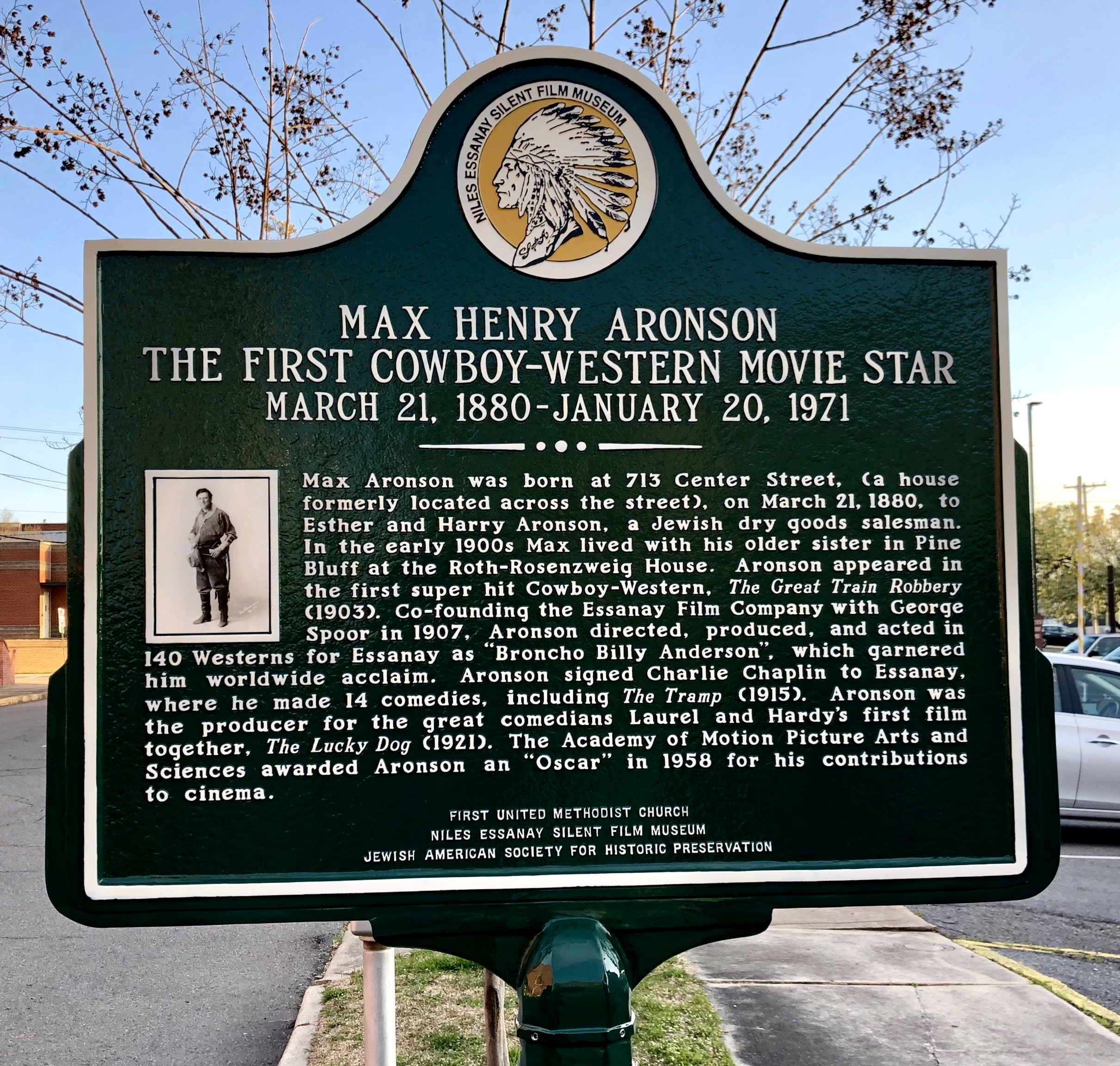

== See also ==
- Broncho Billy Anderson filmography
- The Resurrection of Broncho Billy, a 1970 live action short Western
