= List of Western films of the 1920s =

A list of Western films released in the 1920s. All films are silent unless otherwise designated as a "talkie".

Title	Director	Cast	Country	Subgenre/Notes
1920
The Big Catch	Leo D. Maloney	Hoot Gibson, Jim Corey, Chick Morrison	United States	Western short
Blue Streak McCoy	B. Reeves Eason	Harry Carey, Lila Lesley, Charles Arling	United States	traditional Western
The Broncho Kid	Mack V. Wright	Hoot Gibson, Yvette Mitchell, Dudley Hendricks	United States	Western short
Bullet Proof	Lynn Reynolds	Harry Carey, Fred Gamble, J. Farrell MacDonald	United States	Western short
The Champion Liar	Hoot Gibson	Hoot Gibson, Jim Corey, Dorothy Wood	United States	Western short
The Deerslayer and Chingachgook	Arthur Wellin	Béla Lugosi, Emil Mamelok	Germany	colonial American frontier
Double Danger	Albert Russell	Hoot Gibson, Charles Newton	United States	traditional Western
Elmo the Fearless	J. P. McGowan	Elmo Lincoln, Louise Lorraine	United States	serial Western (considered lost)
Fight It Out	Albert Russell	Hoot Gibson, Charles Newton, Jim Corey	United States	traditional Western
The Fightin' Terror	Hoot Gibson	Hoot Gibson, Jim Corey, Mark Fenton	United States	Western short
A Gamblin' Fool	Leo D. Maloney	Hoot Gibson, Jim Corey, Chick Morrison	United States	Western short
The Grinning Granger	Leo D. Maloney	Hoot Gibson, Jim Corey, Dorothy Wood	United States	Western short
Hair Trigger Stuff	B. Reeves Eason	Hoot Gibson, Mildred Moore, George Field	United States	Western short
Held Up for the Makin's	B. Reeves Eason	Hoot Gibson, Mildred Moore, George Field	United States	Western short
His Nose in the Book	B. Reeves Eason	Hoot Gibson, Mildred Moore, George Field, Jim Corey, B. Reeves Eason, Jr., Tom London	United States	Western short
Human Stuff	B. Reeves Eason	Harry Carey, Charles Le Moyne	United States	traditional Western
'In Wrong' Wright	Albert Russell	Hoot Gibson, Dorothy Wood, Jim Corey	United States	traditional Western
The Invisible Hand	William Bowman	Antonio Moreno, Pauline Curley, Jay Morley	United States	Western serial
The Jay Bird	Phil Rosen	Hoot Gibson, Josephine Hill	United States	Western short
Just Pals	John Ford	Buck Jones, Helen Ferguson, Duke R. Lee	United States	traditional Western
The Kelly Gang	Harry Southwell	Godfrey Cass, V. Upton Brown, Horace Crawford	Australia	Australian Western
The Last of the Mohicans	Maurice Tourneur, Clarence Brown	Wallace Beery, Barbara Bedford, Alan Roscoe	United States	colonial American frontier
The Last of the Mohicans	Arthur Wellin	Béla Lugosi, Charles Barley	Germany	colonial American frontier
Lone Hand Wilson	Lafe McKee, Harry Moody	Lester Cuneo, Annette DeFoe	United States	traditional Western
The Man with the Punch	Edward Laemmle	Hoot Gibson, Jim Corey, Charles Newton	United States	Western short
The Mark of Zorro	Fred Niblo	Douglas Fairbanks	United States	
Masked	Mack V. Right	Hoot Gibson, Virginia Browne Faire, Jim Corey	United States	Western short
The Moon Riders	B. Reeves Eason	Art Acord, Mildred Moore, Charles Newton	United States	serial Western (considered lost)
One Law for All	Leo D. Maloney	Hoot Gibson, Jim Corey, Dorothy Wood	United States	Western short
Overland Red	Lynn Reynolds	Harry Carey, Charles Le Moyne	United States	traditional Western
The Prospector's Vengeance	B. Reeves Eason	George Field, Mildred Moore, Pat O'Malley	United States	Western short
The Rattler's Hiss	B. Reeves Eason	Hoot Gibson, George Field, Mildred Moore	United States	Western short
Roarin' Dan	Phil Rosen	Hoot Gibson, Ethel Shannon	United States	Western short
Robbery Under Arms	Kenneth Brampton	Kenneth Brampton, Vera Archer, Charles Chauvel	Australia	Australian Western
Runnin' Straight	Arthur J. Flaven	Hoot Gibson, Virginia Browne Faire	United States	Western short
Ruth of the Rockies	George Marshall	Ruth Roland, Herbert Heyes, Thomas G. Lingham	United States	serial Western (partially lost)
The Sheriff's Oath	Phil Rosen	Hoot Gibson, Arthur Mackley, Martha Mattox	United States	Western short
The Shootin' Fool	Hoot Gibson	Hoot Gibson, Jim Corey, Lucille Rubey	United States	Western short
The Shootin' Kid	Hoot Gibson	Hoot Gibson, Jim Corey, Dorothy Wood	United States	Western short
The Smilin' Kid	Hoot Gibson	Hoot Gibson, Dorothy Wood, Jim Corey	United States	Western short
The Stranger	W. C. Tuttle	Hoot Gibson, Dorothy Wood	United States	Western short
Sundown Slim	Val Paul	Harry Carey, Genevieve Blinn, J. Morris Foster	United States	traditional Western
Superstition	Edward Laemmle	Hoot Gibson, Charles Newton, Dorothy Wood, Jim Corey	United States	Western short
Thieves' Clothes	Mack V. Wright	Hoot Gibson, Alma Bennett	United States	Western short
Thunderbolt Jack	Francis Ford, Murdock MacQuarrie	Jack Hoxie, Marin Sais	United States	serial Western (considered lost)
Tipped Off	Albert Russell	Hoot Gibson, Gertrude Olmstead, Charles Newton, Jim Corey	United States	Western short
The Toll Gate	Lambert Hillyer	William S. Hart, Anna Q. Nilsson, Joseph Singleton	United States	traditional Western
The Trail of the Hound	Albert Russell	Hoot Gibson, Gertrude Olmstead	United States	Western short
Trailed by Three	Perry N. Vekroff	Stuart Holmes, Frankie Mann, John Webb Dillon	United States	serial Western (considered lost)
The Two-Fisted Love	Edward Laemmle	Hoot Gibson, Jim Corey, Dorothy Wood	United States	Western short
Vanishing Trails	Leon De La Mothe	Franklyn Farnum, L. M. Wells, Duke R. Lee	United States	serial Western (considered lost)
The Veiled Mystery	William Bowman, Webster Cullison, Francis J. Grandon, Antonio Moreno	Antonio Moreno, Pauline Curley, Henry A. Barrows	United States	serial Western
West is Best	Phil Rosen	Hoot Gibson, Jim Corey, Charles Newton	United States	Western short
West is West	Val Paul	Harry Carey, Charles Le Moyne, Ted Brooks	United States	traditional Western
Wolf Tracks	Mack V. Wright	Hoot Gibson, Jim Corey, Charles Newton, Tom London	United States	Western short
1921
Action	John Ford	Hoot Gibson, Francis Ford, J. Farrell MacDonald	United States	traditional Western (considered lost)
The Avenging Arrow	W. S. Van Dyke	Ruth Roland, Edward Hearn, William Steele	United States	serial Western
Bandits Beware	Lee Kohlmar	Hoot Gibson, Charles Newton	United States	Western short
Beating the Game	Lee Kohlmar	Hoot Gibson, Marcella Pershing	United States	Western short
The Big Punch	John Ford	Buck Jones, Barbara Bedford, Jack Curtis	United States	traditional Western
The Cactus Kid	Lee Kohlmar	Hoot Gibson, Charles Newton, Ben Corbett	United States	Western short
Crossed Clues	William James Craft	Hoot Gibson, Jacques Jaccard	United States	Western short
Desperate Trails	John Ford	Harry Carey, Irene Rich, Edward Coxen	United States	traditional Western
Double Crossers	William James Craft	Hoot Gibson, Marcella Pershing	United States	Western short
The Driftin' Kid	Albert Russell	Hoot Gibson, Artie Ortego, Gertrude Olmstead	United States	Western short
Fighting Blood	Lee Kohlmar	Jack Perrin, Louise Lorraine	United States	Western short
The Fightin' Fury	Hoot Gibson	Hoot Gibson, Gertrude Olmstead, Charles Newton	United States	Western short
Finders Keepers	Otis B. Thayer	Edmund Cobb, Violet Mersereau, Dorothy Bridges	United States	traditional Western
The Fire Eater	B. Reeves Eason	Hoot Gibson, Louise Lorraine, Thomas G. Lingham	United States	Western short
The Fox	Robert Thornby	Harry Carey, Gertrude Claire, C. E. Anderson	United States	traditional Western
The Freeze-Out	John Ford	Harry Carey, Helen Ferguson, Charles Le Moyne	United States	traditional Western (considered lost)
Hearts Up	Val Paul	Harry Carey, Arthur Millett, Charles Le Moyne	United States	traditional Western
The Honor of the Mounted	Edward A. Kull	Josephine Hill, George Larkin	United States	Northern Western
Kickaroo	Albert Russell	Hoot Gibson, Gertrude Olmstead	United States	Western short
The Man Who Woke Up	Lee Kohlmar	Hoot Gibson, Artie Ortego	United States	Western short
The Movie Trail	Charles Thompson	Hoot Gibson, Charles Newton	United States	Western short
Red Courage	B. Reeves Eason	Hoot Gibson, Charles Newton, Molly Malone, Joseph W. Girard	United States	traditional Western
The Saddle King	Edward Laemmle	Hoot Gibson, Charles Newton, Jim Corey, Dorothy Wood	United States	Western short
Sands of Sacrifice	Charles Bartlett	Neal Hart, Violet Palmer, Edward Roseman	United States	Northern Western
Sure Fire	John Ford	Hoot Gibson, Molly Malone, B. Reeves Eason, Jr.	United States	traditional Western (considered lost)
Sweet Revenge	Edward Laemmle	Hoot Gibson, Jim Corey, Gertrude Olmstead	United States	Western short
Terror Trail	Edward A. Kull	Eileen Sedgwick, George Larkin	United States	serial Western (considered lost)
Three Word Brand	Lambert Hillyer	William S. Hart, Jane Novak, S. J. Bingham	United States	traditional Western
The Wallop	John Ford	Harry Carey, William Steele, Charles Le Moyne	United States	traditional Western (considered lost)
The White Horseman	Albert Russell	Art Acord, Duke R. Lee, Tote Du Crow	United States	serial Western (considered lost)
Who Was the Man?	Lee Kohlmar	Hoot Gibson, Charles Newton, Jacques Jaccard	United States	Western short
The Wild Wild West	Lee Kohlmar	Hoot Gibson, Jacques Jaccard, Marcella Pershing	United States	Western short
Winners of the West	Edward Laemmle	Art Acord, Myrtle Lind, J. Herbert Frank	United States	serial Western (considered lost)
1922
The Ableminded Lady	Lewis D. Collins, Oliver L. Sellers	Henry B. Walthall, Elinor Fair, Helen Raymond	United States	traditional Western
The Bearcat	Edward Sedgwick	Hoot Gibson, Lillian Rich, Charles K. French	United States	traditional Western
Big Stakes	Clifford S. Elfelt	J. B. Warner, Elinor Fair, Les Bates	United States	traditional Western
In the Days of Buffalo Bill	Edward Laemmle	Art Acord, Duke R. Lee, George A. Williams	United States	serial Western (considered lost)
The Galloping Kid	Nat Ross	Hoot Gibson, Edna Murphy, Lionel Belmore	United States	traditional Western
Good Men and True	Val Paul	Harry Carey, Vola Vale, Noah Beery, Sr.	United States	traditional Western
Headin' West	William James Craft	Hoot Gibson, Jim Corey, Charles Le Moyne	United States	traditional Western
The Loaded Door	Harry A. Pollard	Hoot Gibson, Gertrude Olmstead, A. Edward Sutherland	United States	traditional Western
The Lone Hand	B. Reeves Eason	Hoot Gibson, Marjorie Daw, Helen Holmes	United States	traditional Western
Man to Man	Stuart Paton	Harry Carey, Lillian Rich, Charles Le Moyne	United States	traditional Western
Moonshine Valley	Herbert Brenon	Willian Farnum, Holmes Herbert, Anne Shirley	United States	traditional Western
The Paleface	Buster Keaton	Buster Keaton, Virginia Fox, Joe Roberts	United States	comedy Western
The Purple Riders	William Bertram	Joe Ryan, Elinor Field, Ernest Shields	United States	Western serial
Sky High	Lynn Reynolds	Tom Mix, J. Farrell MacDonald, Eva Novak	United States	action/adventure Western
Step on It!	Jack Conway	Hoot Gibson, Edith Yorke, Frank Lanning	United States	traditional Western
Trimmed	Harry A. Pollard	Hoot Gibson, Patsy Ruth Miller, Fred Kohler	United States	traditional Western
White Eagle	Fred Jackman, W. S. Van Dyke	Ruth Roland, Earl Metcalfe, Bud Osborne	United States	serial Western (considered lost)
1923
$1,000 Reward	Charles R. Seeling	Guinn "Big Boy" Williams	United States	traditional Western
The Call of the Canyon	Victor Fleming	Richard Dix, Laura Anson, Noah Beery, Sr.	United States	traditional Western
Canyon of the Fools	Val Paul	Harry Carey, Marguerite Clayton	United States	traditional Western
The Covered Wagon	James Cruze	J. Warren Kerrigan, Lois Wilson, Alan Hale, Sr.	United States	epic Western
Crashin' Thru	Val Paul	Harry Carey, Cullen Landis, Myrtle Stedman	United States	traditional Western
Dead Game	Edward Sedgwick	Hoot Gibson, Robert McKim, Harry Carter	United States	traditional Western
Desert Driven	Val Paul	Harry Carey, Marguerite Clayton, George Waggner	United States	traditional Western
The Ghost City	Jay Marchant	Pete Morrison, Margaret Morris, Frank Rice	United States	serial Western (considered lost)
In the Days of Daniel Boone	William James Craft	Charles Brinley, Jack Mower, Eileen Sedgwick, Ruth Royce, Herschel Mayall, Duke R. Lee	United States	frontier Western (considered lost)
The Kickback	Val Paul	Harry Carey, Henry B. Walthall, Charles Le Moyne	United States	traditional Western
Kindled Courage	William Worthington	Hoot Gibson, Harold Goodwin, Harry Tenbrook	United States	traditional Western
The Miracle Baby	Val Paul	Harry Carey, Edward Hearn, Edmund Cobb	United States	traditional Western
The Oregon Trail	Edward Laemmle	Art Acord, Louis Lorraine, Duke R. Lee	United States	serial Western (considered lost)
Out o' Luck	Hoot Gibson	Hoot Gibson, Gertrude Holmstead, Jim Corey	United States	Western short
The Phantom Fortune	Robert F. Hill	William Desmond, Esther Ralston, Lewis Sargent	United States	serial Western
The Ramblin' Kid	Edward Sedgwick	Hoot Gibson, Laura La Plante, Harold Goodwin	United States	traditional Western
Ridin' Wild	Nat Ross	Hoot Gibson, Edna Murphy, Wade Boteler	United States	traditional Western
Ruggles of Red Gap	James Cruze	Edward Everett Horton, Ernest Torrence, Lois Wilson	United States	comedy Western (considered lost)
The Santa Fe Trail	Ashton Dearholt, Robert A. Dillon	Jack Perrin, Neva Gerber, Jim Welch	United States	serial Western (considered lost)
Shootin' for Love	Edward Sedgwick	Hoot Gibson, William Steele, Mack V. Wright	United States	traditional Western
Single Handed	Edward Sedgwick	Hoot Gibson, Laura La Plante, Alfred Allen	United States	traditional Western
The Social Buccaneer	Robert F. Hill	Jack Mulhall, Margaret Livingston, William Welsh	United States	serial Western (considered lost)
Shootin' for Love	Edward Sedgwick	Hoot Gibson, William Steele, Mack V. Wright	United States	traditional Western
The Spoilers	Lambert Hillyer	Milton Sills, Anna Q. Nilsson	United States	Northern Western
Three Jumps Ahead	John Ford	Tom Mix, Alma Bennett, Edward Peil, Sr.	United States	traditional Western (considered lost)
The Virginian	Tom Forman (actor)	Kenneth Harlan, Florence Vidor, Russell Simpson, Pat O'Malley, Raymond Hatton	United States	traditional Western
When the Kellys Were Out	Harry Southwell	Godfrey Cass	Australia	Australian Western
Wild Bill Hickok	Clifford Smith	William S. Hart, Ethel Grey Terry, Jack Gardner	United States	gunfighter Western
1924
Ace of Cactus Range	Victor Adamson, Malon Andrus	Art Mix, Virginia Warwick, Clifford Davidson	United States	detective Western
Ace of the Law	Louis King	Bill Patton, Peggy O'Day, Lew Meehan	United States	traditional Western
Days of '49	Jacques Jaccard	Neva Gerber, Edmund Cobb, Charles Brinley	United States	Western serial
The Desert Outlaw	Edmund Mortimer	Buck Jones, Evelyn Brent, DeWitt Jennings	United States	traditional Western
The Flaming Forties	Tom Forman	Harry Carey, William Norton Bailey, Jacqueline Gadsden	United States	traditional Western
Galloping Hoofs	George B. Seitz	Allene Ray, J. Barney Sherry, Ernest Hilliard	United States	serial Western (considered lost)
The Hellion	Bruce M. Mitchell	Marin Sais, J. B. Warner, Boris Karloff	United States	traditional Western
Hook and Ladder	Edward Sedgwick	Hoot Gibson, Frank Beal, Philo McCullough	United States	traditional Western
The Iron Horse	John Ford	George O'Brien, Madge Bellamy, Cyril Chadwick	United States	empire building Western
Leatherstocking	George B. Seitz	Edna Murphy, Harold Miller, Frank Lackteen	United States	serial frontier Western
The Lightning Rider	Lloyd Ingraham	Harry Carey, Virginia Brown Faire, Thomas G. Lingham	United States	traditional Western
The Mine with the Iron Door	Sam Wood	Dorothy Mackaill, Pat O'Malley, Raymond Hatton	United States	traditional Western
The Night Hawk	Stuart Paton	Harry Carey, Claire Adams, Joseph W. Girard	United States	traditional Western
North of 36	Irvin Willat	Jack Holt, Ernest Torrence, Lois Wilson	United States	traditional Western
A Pair of Hellions	Walter Willis	Ranger Bill Miller, Patricia Palmer	United States	traditional Western
The Plunderer	George Archainbaud	Frank Mayo, Evelyn Brent, Tom Santschi	United States	traditional Western (considered lost)
Riders of the Plains	Jacques Jaccard	Jack Perrin, Marilyn Mills, Ruth Royce	United States	serial Western
The Riddle Rider	William James Craft	William Desmond, Eileen Sedgwick, Helen Holmes	United States	serial Western (considered lost)
Ride for Your Life	Edward Sedgwick	Hoot Gibson, Laura La Plante, Harry Todd	United States	traditional Western
Riders of the Plains	Jacques Jaccard	Jack Perrin, Marilyn Mills, Ruth Royce, Charles Brinley	United States	serial Western
Tiger Thompson	B. Reeves Eason	Harry Carey, Marguerite Clayton, John Webb Dillon	United States	traditional Western
The Trouble Shooter	Jack Conway	Tom Mix, Kathleen Key, Frank Currier	United States	traditional Western
The Way of a Man	George B. Seitz	Allene Ray, Bud Osborne	United States	serial Western (considered lost)
West of Hot Dog	Scott Pembroke, Joe Rock	Stan Laurel	United States	comedy Western short
1925
Ace of Spades	Henry MacRae	William Desmond, Mary McAllister, William Steele	United States	serial Western
The Bad Lands	Dell Henderson	Harry Carey, Wilfred Lucas, Lee Shumway	United States	traditional Western
Beyond the Border	Scott R. Dunlap	Harry Carey, William Scott, Mildred Harris	United States	traditional Western
The Demon Rider	Paul Hurst	Ken Maynard, Alma Rayford, Fred Burns	United States	traditional Western
The Fighting Ranger	Jay Marchant	Jack Dougherty, Eileen Sedgwick, Bud Osborne	United States	serial Western (considered lost)
Go West	Buster Keaton	Buster Keaton, Howard Truesdale, Kathleen Myers	United States	comedy Western
The Gold Rush	Charlie Chaplin	Charlie Chaplin, Mack Swain, Tom Murray	United States	comedy Western
Idaho	Robert F. Hill	Mahlon Hamilton, Vivian Rich, Frederick Vroom	United States	serial Western (considered lost)
The Lucky Horseshoe	John G. Blystone	Tom Mix, Billie Dove, Malcolm Waite	United States	traditional Western
The Man from Red Gulch	Edmund Mortimer	Harry Carey, Harriet Hammond, Frank Campeau	United States	traditional Western
The Prairie Pirate	Edmund Mortimer	Harry Carey, Trilby Clark, Lloyd Whitlock	United States	traditional Western
The Prairie Wife	Hugo Ballin	Dorothy Devore, Herbert Rawlinson, Gibson Gowland, Boris Karloff	United States	traditional Western (considered lost)
Riders of the Purple Sage	Lynn Reynolds	Tom Mix, Beatrice Burnham, Arthur Morrison	United States	traditional Western
Silent Sanderson	Scott R. Dunlap	Harry Carey, Trilby Clark, John Miljan	United States	traditional Western
The Texas Trail	Scott R. Dunlap	Harry Carey, Ethel Shannon, Charles K. French	United States	traditional Western
The Thundering Herd	William K. Howard	Jack Holt, Lois Wilson, Noah Beery, Sr., Raymond Hatton, Charles Stanton Ogle, Tim McCoy	United States	traditional Western
Tumbleweeds	William S. Hart, King Baggot	William S. Hart, Barbara Bedford, Lucian Littlefield	United States	traditional Western
The Vanishing American	George B. Seitz	Richard Dix, Lois Wilson, Noah Beery	United States	traditional Western
Wild West	Robert F. Hill	Jack Mulhall, Helen Ferguson, Eddie Phillips	United States	serial Western (considered lost)
1926
3 Bad Men	John Ford	George O'Brien, Olive Borden, Lou Tellegen	United States	outlaw Western
Ace of Action	William Bertram	Hal Taliaferro, Alma Rayford, Charles Colby	United States	traditional Western
The Ace of Clubs	J. P. McGowan	Al Hoxie, Minna Redman, Andrew Waldron	United States	traditional Western
The Bar-C Mystery	Robert F. Hill	Dorothy Phillips, Wallace MacDonald, Ethel Clayton	United States	serial Western (considered lost)
Desert Gold	George B. Seitz	Neil Hamilton, Shirley Mason, Robert Frazer	United States	traditional Western
Driftin' Thru	Scott R. Dunlap	Harry Carey, Stanton Heck, G. Raymond Nye	United States	traditional Western
Fighting with Buffalo Bill	Ray Taylor	Wallace MacDonald, Edmund Cobb, Robert Homans	United States	serial Western (considered lost)
The Frontier Trail	Scott R. Dunlap	Harry Carey, Mabel Julienne Scott, Ernest Hilliard	United States	traditional Western
The Great K & A Train Robbery	Lewis Seiler	Tom Mix, Dorothy Dwan, Will Walling	United States	traditional Western
Jim, the Conqueror	George B. Seitz	William Boyd, Elinor Fair, Walter Long	United States	traditional Western
The Last Frontier	George B. Seitz	William Boyd, Marguerite De La Motte, Jack Hoxie	United States	traditional Western
The Man in the Saddle	Lynn Reynolds	Hoot Gibson, Charles Hill Mailes, Fay Wray	United States	traditional Western
Satan Town	Edmund Mortimer	Harry Carey, Charles Clary, Richard Neill	United States	traditional Western
The Seventh Bandit	Scott R. Dunlap	Harry Carey, Harriet Hammond, John Webb Dillon	United States	traditional Western
The Winking Idol	Francis Ford	William Desmond, Eileen Sedgwick, Jack Richardson	United States	serial Western (considered lost)
1927
The Golden Stallion	Harry S. Webb	Maurice Bennett Flynn, Joe Bonomo, Jay J. Bryan	United States	serial Western
Hawk of the Hills	Spencer Gordon Bennet	Allene Ray, Walter Miller, Frank Lackteen	United States	serial Western
Heroes of the Wild	Harry S. Webb	Jack Hoxie, Josephine Hill, Joe Bonomo	United States	serial Western (considered lost)
The Kid Brother	Ted Wilde	Harold Lloyd, Jobyana Ralston, Walter James	United States	comedy Western
The Meddlin' Stranger	Richard Thorpe	Wally Wales, Nola Luxford, Charles K. French, Boris Karloff	United States	traditional Western
Nevada	John Waters	Gary Cooper, Thelma Todd, William Powell, Ernie Adams	United States	traditional Western
Spoilers of the West	W. S. Van Dyke	Tim McCoy, Marjorie Daw, William Fairbanks	United States	traditional Western
Whispering Smith Rides	Ray Taylor	Wallace MacDonald, Rose Blossom, J. P. McGowan	United States	serial Western
1928
A Final Reckoning	Ray Taylor	Newton House, Louise Lorraine, Edmund Cobb	United States	serial Western (considered lost)
Across the Plains	Robert J. Horner	Ted Wells, Iona Reed, Jack Richardson	United States	traditional Western
Arizona Days	J. P. McGowan	Bob Custer, Peggy Montgomery, J. P. McGowan	United States	traditional Western
Burning Bridges	James P. Hogan	Harry Carey, William Bailey, Eddie Phillips	United States	traditional Western
In Old Arizona	Irving Cummings	Warner Baxter, Neva Gerber, Al Ferguson	United States	traditional Western, first talkie Western
The Border Patrol	James P. Hogan	Harry Carey, Phillips Smalley, Richard Tucker	United States	traditional Western
The Cavalier	Irvin Willat	Richard Talmadge, Barbara Bedford	United States	dramatic Western
The Trail of '98	Clarence Brown	Dolores del Río, Ralph Forbes, Karl Dane	United States	Alaska gold rush Western
The Vanishing Rider	Ray Taylor	William Desmond (actor), Ethlyne Clair, Nelson McDowell	United States	serial Western (considered lost)
The Vanishing West	Richard Thorpe	Jack Perrin, Eileen Sedgwick, Yakima Canutt	United States	serial Western (considered lost)
The Whispering Rider	Robert J. Horner	William Desmond, Derelys Perdue, Tom London	United States	serial Western
The Wind	Victor Sjöström	Lillian Gish, Lars Hanson, Montagu Love	United States	dramatic Western
1929
Queen of the Northwoods	Spencer Gordon Bennet	Walter Miller, Ethlyne Clair, Tom London	United States	serial Northern Western
Redskin	Victor Schertzinger	Richard Dix, Julie Carter, Tully Marshall	United States	revisionist Western
The Virginian	Victor Fleming	Gary Cooper, Walter Huston, Richard Arlen, Mary Brian	United States	traditional Western
Thundering Thompson	Ben F. Wilson	Cheyenne Bill, Neva Gerber, Al Ferguson	United States	traditional Western
Tiger Rose	George Fitzmaurice	Monte Blue, Lupe Vélez, H. B. Warner	United States	sound Northern Western
