= West Is West =

West Is West may refer to:

- West Is West (1920 film), an American silent film
- West Is West (2010 film), a British comedy-drama film
