= Single-Handed =

Single-Handed or single-handed may refer to:

- Single Handed (1923 film), a silent Western film
- Single-Handed (1953 film), a British war film
- Single-Handed (TV series), an Irish television drama series

== See also ==
- Single-handed sailing, sailing with only one crewmember
- Single-hander (disambiguation)
