= West Is West (1920 film) =

1920 film

West is West
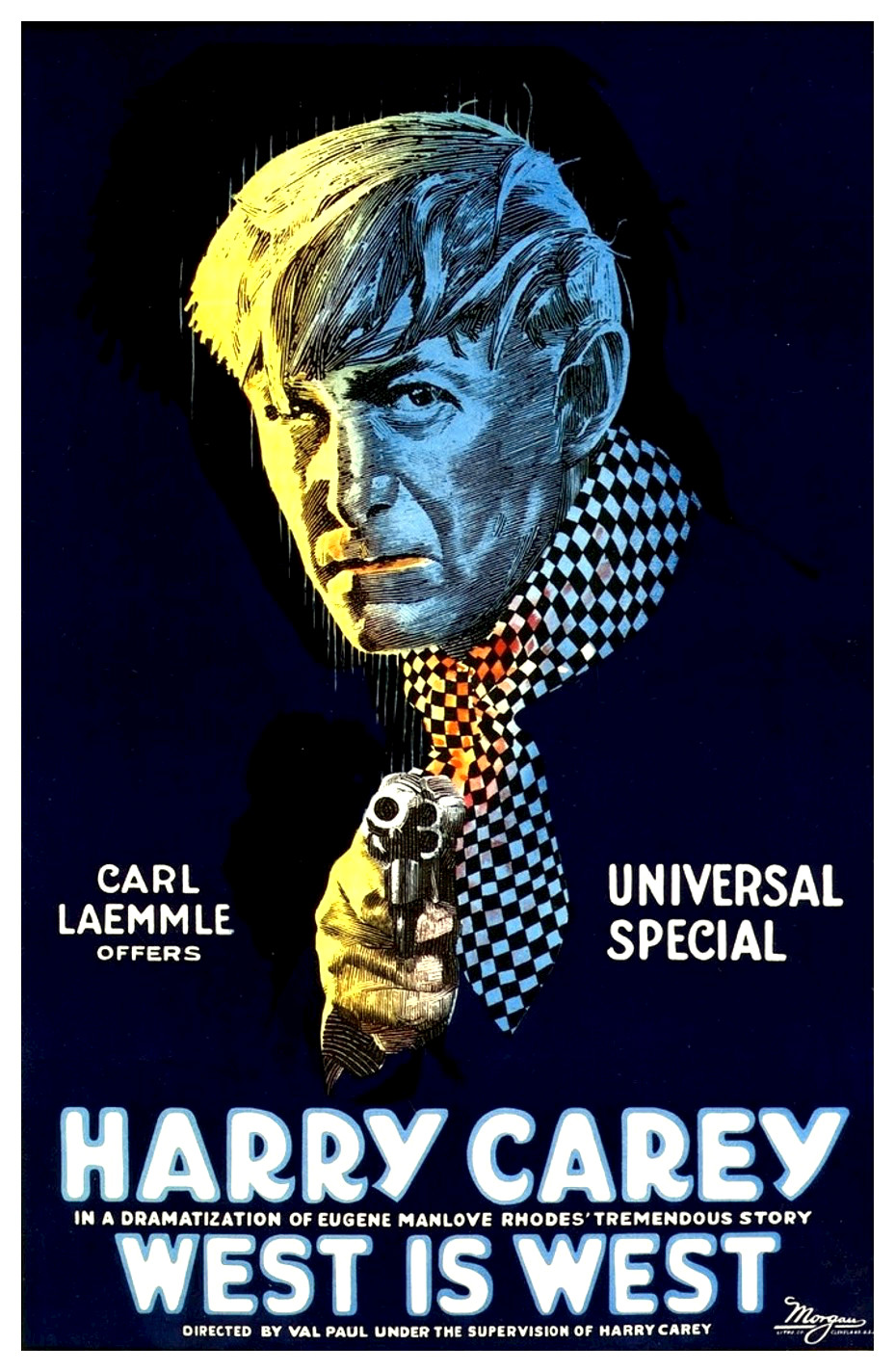
- Film poster
- Directed by: Val Paul
- Written by: George C. Hull; Eugene Manlove Rhodes
- Starring: Harry Carey
- Cinematography: Harry M. Fowler
- Distributed by: Universal Film Manufacturing Company
- Release date: November 22, 1920
- Running time: 5 reels
- Country: United States
- Languages: Silent; English intertitles

West Is West is a 1920 American silent Western film directed by Val Paul and starring Harry Carey.

== Cast ==
- Harry Carey as Dick Rainboldt
- Charles Le Moyne as Connors
- Joe Harris as Spencer
- Ted Brooks as Kirby
- Ed Lattell as Herman Mendenhall
- Otto Nelson as Sim Wigfall
- Frank Braidwood as Billy Armstrong
- Arthur Millett as J.C. Armstrong
- Adelaide Hallock as Mrs. Armstrong (credited as Adelaide Halleck)
- James O'Neill as "Black Beard" (credited as Jim O'Neil)
- Scott McKee as Nagle
- Mignonne Golden as Katie Wigfall (credited as Mignonne)
- Jack Dill as Denjy
- Sue Mason as Judith Elliott
