= The Law of the Wilds =

- Directed by: Thomas Ricketts
- Written by: Dorothy Rockfort (story)
- Starring: Harry Van Meter; Reaves Eason; Jack Richardson
- Distributed by: Mutual Film
- Release date: February 1, 1915
- Country: United States
- Languages: Silent film English intertitles

The Law of the Wilds is a 1915 American silent short drama film directed by Thomas Ricketts and starring Harry Van Meter, Reaves Eason, and Jack Richardson.

== Cast ==
- Harry Van Meter as Frank Storm
- Reaves Eason as Steve Baker
- Jack Richardson as Pete Lear
- Perry Banks as Storekeeper
- Emma Kluge as Storekeeper's Wife
- Vivian Rich as Jennie
- Arthur Millett as Sheriff
- Louise Lester
