= Treat 'Em Rough (1919 film) =

1919 film

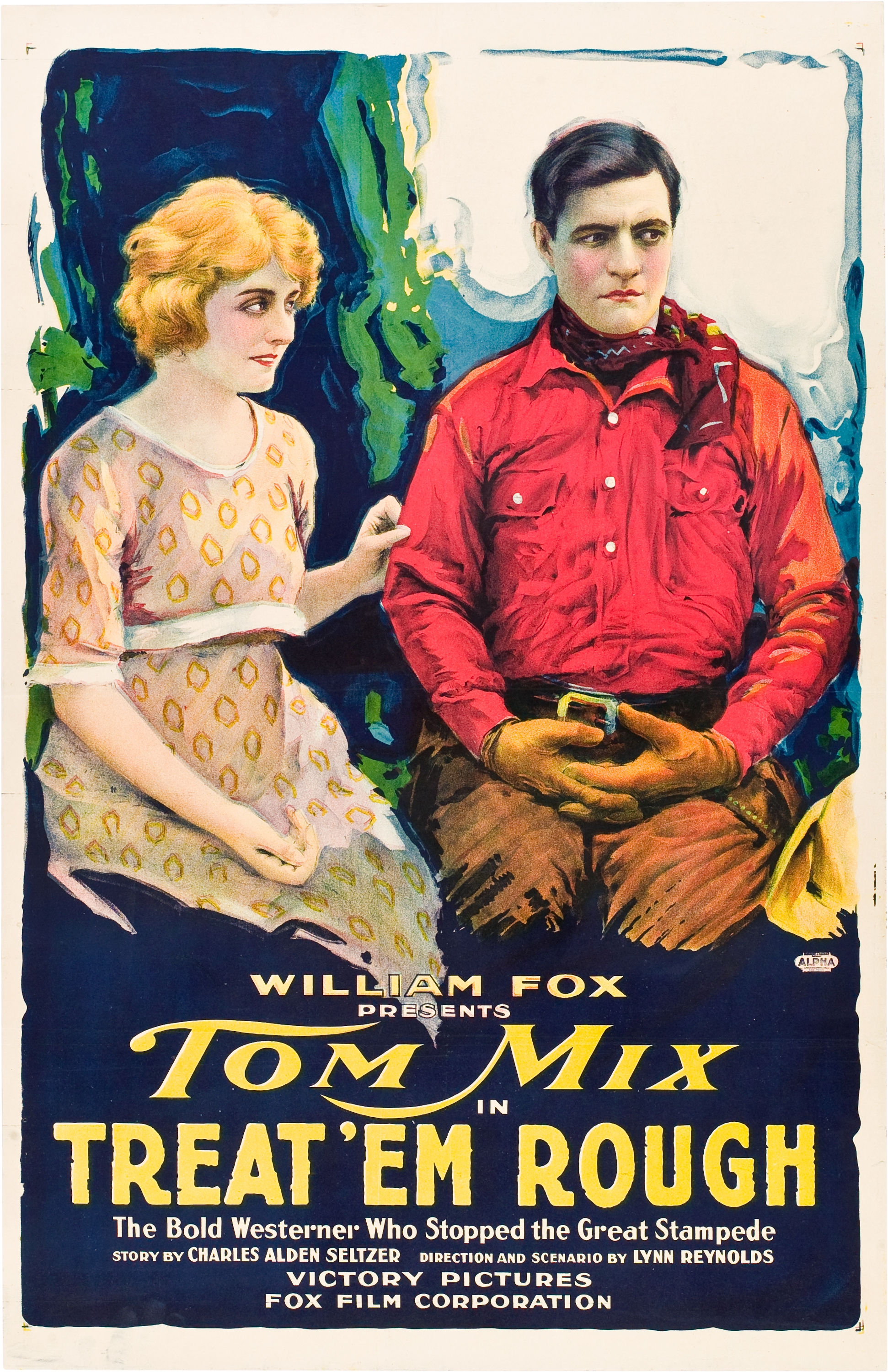
- Movie poster
- Directed by: Lynn Reynolds
- Written by: Lynn Reynolds (scenario)
- Based on: Treat 'Em Rough by Charles Alden Seltzer
- Starring: Tom Mix; Jane Novak
- Cinematography: Devereaux Jennings
- Distributed by: Fox Film Corporation
- Release date: January 5, 1919
- Running time: 5 reels
- Country: United States
- Languages: Silent; English intertitles

For the 1942 film starring Eddie Albert and William Frawley, see Treat 'Em Rough.

Treat 'Em Rough is a 1919 American silent Western film starring Tom Mix and directed by Lynn Reynolds, who also wrote the screenplay based upon a novel by Charles Alden Seltzer. The supporting cast includes Jane Novak and Val Paul. The picture was filmed in Prescott, Arizona. Mix plays a gunfighter who is hired to stop a gang of cattle rustlers. Mix's stunt work in this film was so impressive that a Variety reviewer suggested that trick photography was involved.

== Plot ==
As described in a film publication, daredevil cowboy Ned Ferguson is hired by John Stafford to stop the cattle rustling plaguing his ranch. On the way to the ranch Ned is bitten by a rattlesnake and is nursed by Mary Radford, who is writing a western novel. Ranch foreman Dave Leviatt tells Ned that Mary's brother Ben is behind the rustling. After Ben and Ned come to an understanding, Dave shoots Ben from undercover, and Ben is sure that Ned double-crossed him. Mary will have nothing to do with Ned, even after Ned saves her life during a cattle stampede. Ned finally runs down the rustlers, and Mary sees him as a hero instead of merely putting him in her novel.

== Cast ==
- Tom Mix as Ned Ferguson
- Jane Novak as Mary Radford
- Val Paul as Ben Radford
- Charles Le Moyne as Dave Leviatt
- Jack Curtis as John Stafford

== Preservation ==
The film was preserved at the George Eastman House in 2008 through a federal grant from the National Film Preservation Foundation.
