= Hitchin' Posts =

1920 film directed by John Ford

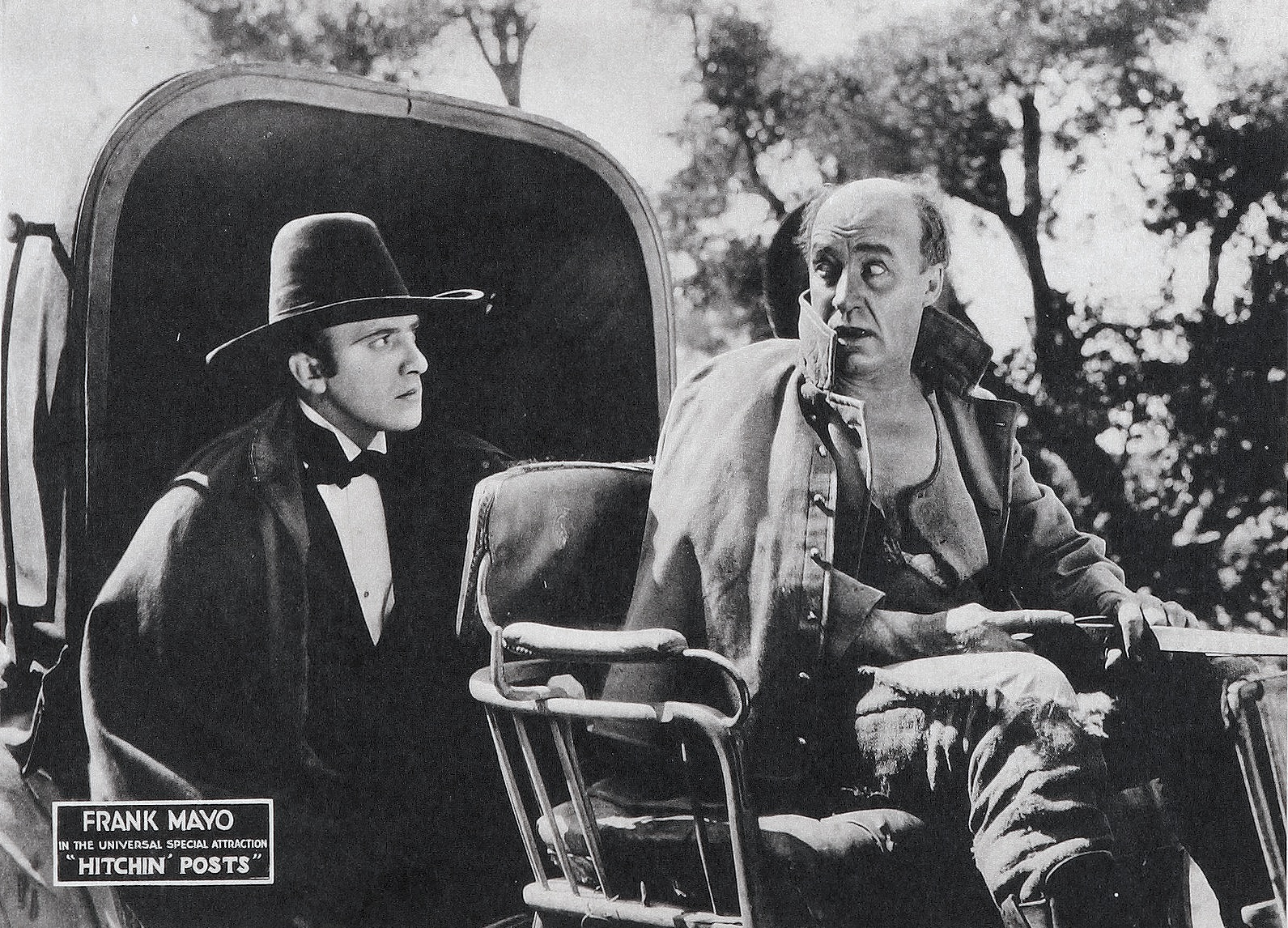
- Lobby card.
- Directed by: John Ford
- Written by: George C. Hull; Harold Shumate
- Starring: Frank Mayo
- Cinematography: Benjamin H. Kline
- Distributed by: Universal Film Manufacturing Company
- Release date: September 1920
- Running time: 50 minutes
- Country: United States
- Language: Silent (English intertitles)

Hitchin' Posts is a 1920 American drama film directed by John Ford. It is considered to be a lost film.

== Plot ==
As described in a film magazine, Jefferson Todd and Louis Castiga, brothers-in-law, come to blows on a Mississippi River steamer when Todd discovers Castiga's presence there with a woman usurping the place of his wife, Todd's sister. Todd, a Southern gentleman whose fortune was depleted during the Civil War, is attempting to rebuild it by gambling on the river boats that frequent the great river. He wins four race horses at poker with Colonel Brereton, but refuses to collect the stakes. Brereton insists, and then takes his own life. Brereton's suicide causes Todd to question his new profession. Todd and Castiga again meet at the plantation home of the Colonel's daughter Barbara, both having gone there to break the news of her father's death. Castiga's wiliness makes Barbara believe that Todd is an intruder and the cause of her father's ruin. The trouble between the men results in a duel in which Castiga cheats and is driven out of town. Barbara's faith in Todd is established and together they join the great army of homesteaders and go West for the great land lottery that followed the Civil War. They win a race for a homestead involving prairie schooners, buckboards, horse teams, and race horses, but fall victims to a plot hatched by Castiga. In a struggle between the two, Todd is victorious while his enemy meets his death. Love beckens for Todd and Barbara.

== Cast ==
- Frank Mayo as Jefferson Todd
- Beatrice Burnham as Barbara Brereton
- C.E. Anderson as Captain of steamer
- Matthew Biddulph as Major Grey (credited as M. Biddulph)
- Mark Fenton as Colonel Brereton
- Dagmar Godowsky as Octoroon
- Joe Harris as Louis Castiga
- Duke R. Lee as Colonel Lancy (credited as Duke Lee)
- J. Farrell MacDonald as Joe Alabam (credited as J. Farrell McDonald)

== See also ==
- List of lost films
