= Where is This West? =

1923 film

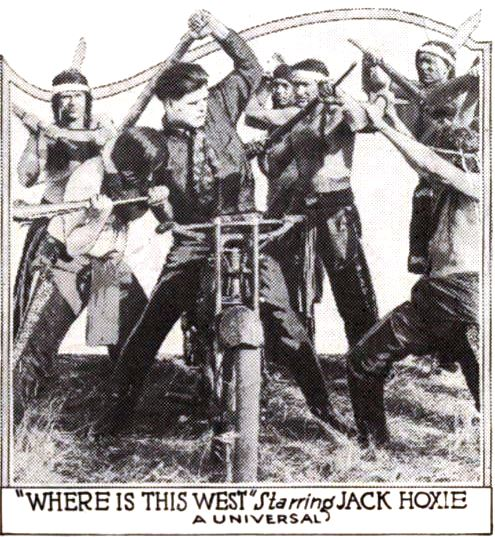
- Newspaper advertisement
- Directed by: George Marshall
- Written by: George Hively; George C. Hull
- Produced by: Carl Laemmle
- Starring: Jack Hoxie; Mary Philbin; Bob McKenzie
- Cinematography: Clyde De Vinna; Ray Ramsey
- Production company: Universal Pictures
- Distributed by: Universal Pictures
- Release date: September 17, 1923
- Running time: 55 minutes
- Country: United States
- Languages: Silent; English intertitles

Where is This West? is a 1923 American silent comedy Western film directed by George Marshall and written by George Hively and George C. Hull. The film stars Jack Hoxie, Mary Philbin, and Bob McKenzie.

== Plot ==
As described in a film magazine, John Harley (Hoxie) has a job juggling milk cans for a big milk company in a small Eastern town, but he is not exactly stuck on it and, with his friend Bimbo McGurk (McKenzie), makes it as light as he can by getting what fun there is out of it. Sally Summers (Philbin) is unhappily working out her salvation in a lunch room in the same town, juggling plates of various sizes and hollering out her orders to the tune of banging dishes and rattling silver. One fine day along comes an announcement telling John he has inherited half of a big ranch out in the great open spaces. Sally must have received a similar announcement, because she shows up at the lawyer's office the same day that John does and they discover that they are partners. The lawyer attempts to discourage them, but they are both too anxious for a change and agree to take a chance and see what is what. John's friend Bimbo goes along with them, but he has to ride the rods because he lacks the price of a seat in the coach. The poor fellow gets left when they are almost there, just because he had to stop too long for a drink of water. The foreman of the ranch to which John and Sally are bound hears of their coming and, desiring the property for himself, plans a little scheme by which he hopes to make the tenderfoots’ visit very short. With the help of the other boys he fakes a terrible town and stages a couple of holdups. John gives them a good run for their money and they finally have to kidnap Sally. When this happens John goes up in the air because he has come to think quite a lot of his new partner, and he starts right in to show these rough riders where they get off. He swipes a motorcycle and chases them right to their lair in the hills. In the meantime Bimbo has wandered into the camp of a tribe of Indians, who are in on the game too and have been paid to stage a raid on the cabin in the hills. Bimbo follows them when they start on their trip and enters into the free-for-all fight that follows. With his motorcycle and the help of Bimbo, who does not know who he's helping, John manages to vanquish his foes and rescue his sweetheart and partner. Bimbo is sure surprised when he finds out who he has been fighting for, and so glad that he doesn't know what to do. John and Sally, however, are quite sure about their next move and start out to find the nearest parson so that they can make their new partnership a lifetime affair.

== Cast list ==
- Jack Hoxie as John Harley
- Mary Philbin as Sallie Summers
- Bob McKenzie as Bimbo McGuire
- Sid Jordan as Buck Osborne
- Slim Cole as Wild Honey
- Joseph Girard as Lawyer Browns
- Bernard Siegel as Indian servant
