= Hell Bent (film) =

1918 film directed by John Ford

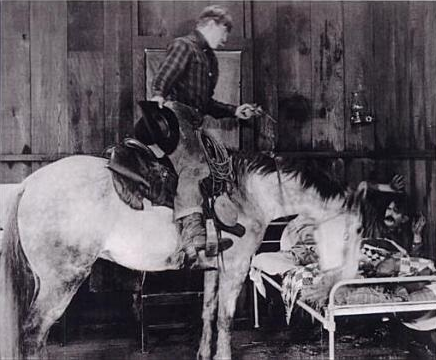
- Scene from the film
- Directed by: John Ford
- Written by: John Ford; Harry Carey; Eugene B. Lewis
- Starring: Harry Carey
- Cinematography: Ben F. Reynolds
- Distributed by: Universal Film Manufacturing Company
- Release date: July 6, 1918
- Running time: 50 minutes
- Country: United States
- Language: Silent (English intertitles)

Hell Bent is a 1918 American silent Western film directed by John Ford and featuring Harry Carey. A print of the film exists in the Czech Film Archive.

Full film

== Plot ==
As described in a film magazine, Bess Thurston, whose no-account brother Jack is unable to support her, obtains employment in a dance hall. This shatters the illusions of Cheyenne Harry, who has fallen in love with her. When he rescues her from the advances of Beau Ross, Cheyenne's confidence in her is restored. Her brother then aids Beau in an attempted robbery and Harry allows them to escape. Beau takes Bess with him into the desert. Harry follows and a duel ensues in which they are both wounded. Bess rides the only horse left out of the desert, while Beau and Harry struggle along on foot. A sandstorm results in the death of Beau, but Harry lives to find happiness with Bess.

== Cast ==
- Harry Carey as Harry "Cheyenne Harry" Henderson
- Duke R. Lee as Bill "Cimmaron Bill" (credited as Duke Lee)
- Neva Gerber as Bess Thurston
- Vester Pegg as Jack Thurston
- Joe Harris as Beau Ross (credited as Joseph Harris)
- Steve Clemente as Undetermined Role
- Millard K. Wilson as Undetermined Role
- Molly Malone as Undetermined Role

== Reception ==
Like many American films of the time, Hell Bent was subject to restrictions and cuts by city and state film censorship boards. For example, the Chicago Board of Censors cut, in Reel 1, all scenes of the stage holdup, Reel 4, two scenes of men working at safe, all scenes of holdup on coach, Reel 5, binding man to horse, and three scenes of bandits in cabin shooting.

== Restoration and home video ==
In 2019, the film was digitally restored by Universal Pictures and released the following year on Blu-ray and DVD by Kino Lorber.
