= George C. Hull =

American screenwriter

- Born: January 28, 1878
- Died: February 2, 1953 (aged 75); Los Angeles, California, USA
- Occupation: Screenwriter
- Years active: 1918-1932

George C. Hull (January 28, 1878 – February 2, 1953) was an American screenwriter. He wrote for 50 films between 1918 and 1932. He died in Los Angeles, California.

== Partial filmography ==
- The Sea Flower (1918), as writer with H. Tipton Steck
- The Fighting Brothers (1919)
- His Buddy (1919)
- 'If Only' Jim (1920)
- Hitchin' Posts (1920)
- West is West (1920)
- White Youth (1920)
- The Freeze-Out (1921)
- The Wallop (1921)
- Tiger True (1921)
- Desperate Youth (1921)
- Sure Fire (1921)
- Conflict (1921)
- Man to Man (1922)
- Human Hearts (1922)
- The Girl Who Ran Wild (1922)
- One Wonderful Night (1922)
- The Gentleman from America (1923)
- Single Handed (1923)
- Double Dealing (1923)
- Out of Luck (1923)
- Where is This West? (1923)
- Wanderer of the Wasteland (1924)
- The Border Legion (1924)
- Lord Jim (1925)
- The Sorrows of Satan (1926)
- Beware of Blondes (1928)
- The Phantom of the North (1929)
