= Robert De Grasse =

American cinematographer (1900–1971)

- Born: February 9, 1900; Maplewood, New Jersey, U.S.
- Died: January 28, 1971 (aged 70); Newport Beach, California, U.S.
- Other name: Bob De Grasse
- Occupation: Cinematographer
- Relatives: Sam De Grasse (uncle)

Robert De Grasse (February 9, 1900 – January 28, 1971) was an American cinematographer and member of the American Society of Cinematographers. Over the course of his career, he was nominated for an Academy Award in 1939 and a Primetime Emmy Award in 1958.

== Career ==
Born in Maplewood, New Jersey, his family worked in the fledgling movie industry. Robert De Grasse began his career as an assistant cameraman and then moved on to become a full-time cinematographer by the time he was 21 years old. He was also the nephew of Canadian Actor Sam De Grasse.

He worked on over 100 movies including Vigil in the Night (1940), The Leopard Man (1943) and The Body Snatcher (1945) as well as classic television shows such as I Love Lucy and The Dick Van Dyke Show.

In 1939, he was nominated for the Academy Award for Best Cinematography for his work on the film Vivacious Lady.

Robert De Grasse died in 1971 in Newport Beach, California.

== Filmography ==
- Desperate Trails (1921)
- The Kickback (1922)
- Good Men and True (1922)
- Thundergate (1923)
- Crashin' Thru (1923)
- Desert Driven (1923)
- Canyon of the Fools (1923)
- Three Pals (1926)
- The Swift Shadow (1927)
- Law of Fear (1928)
- Breed of the Sunsets (1928)
- Lightning Speed (1928)
- Dog Law (1928)
- Fangs of the Wild (1928)
- Tracked (1928)
- Beyond London Lights (1928)
- Fury of the Wild (1929)
- The One Man Dog (1929)
- The Sign of Four (1932)
- Nine Till Six (1932)
- The Water Gipsies (1932)
- Freckles (1935)
- Alice Adams (1935)
- Seven Keys to Baldpate (1935)
- Break of Hearts (1935)
- Wanted! Jane Turner (1936)
- A Woman Rebels (1936)
- Love on a Bet (1936)
- M'Liss (1936)
- The Witness Chair (1936)
- Chatterbox (1936)
- Stage Door (1937)
- The Outcasts of Poker Flats (1937)
- Quality Street (1937)
- Having Wonderful Time (1938)
- Carefree (1938)
- Vivacious Lady (1938)
- Career (1939)
- Fifth Avenue Girl (1939)
- Bachelor Mother (1939)
- The Story of Vernon and Irene Castle (1939)
- Kitty Foyle (1940)
- Lucky Partners (1940)
- Vigil in the Night (1940)
- Unexpected Uncle (1941)
- Father Takes a Wife (1941)
- Footlight Fever (1941)
- A Date with the Falcon (1941)
- My Favorite Spy (1942)
- Seven Days Leave (1942)
- Seven Miles from Alcatraz (1942)
- The Mayor of 44th Street (1942)
- Highways by Night (1942)
- Pittsburgh (1942)
- Higher and Higher (1943)
- Lady of Burlesque (1943)
- Forever and a Day (1943)
- The Leopard Man (1943)
- The Iron Major (1943)
- Step Lively (1944)
- Show Business (1944)

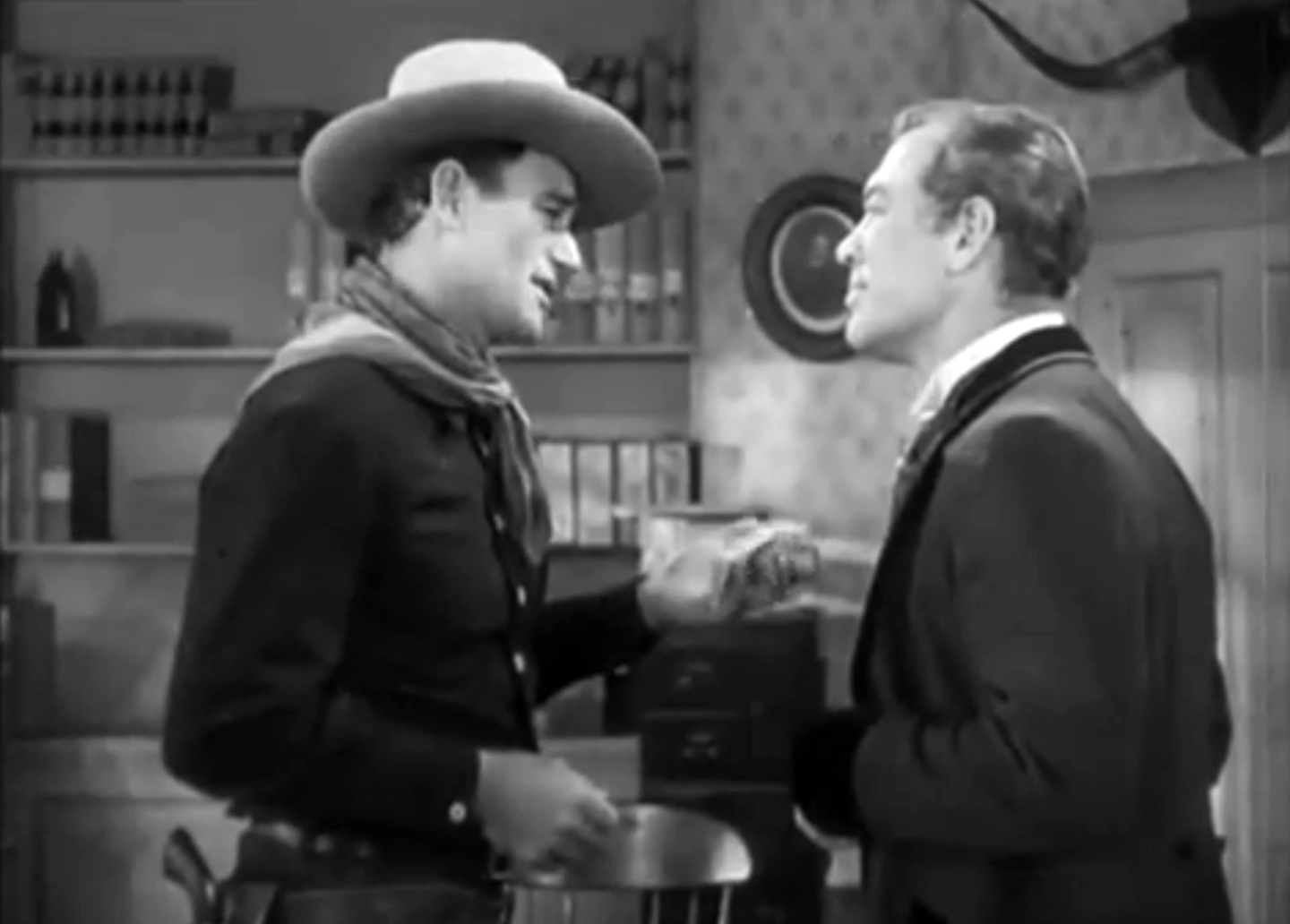
John Wayne and Ward Bond in Tall in the Saddle

- Tall in the Saddle (1944)
- The Body Snatcher (1945)
- George White's Scandals (1945)
- Flame of Barbary Coast (1945)
- The House I Live In (1945)
- Beware of Redheads (1945)
- Badman's Territory (1946)
- Riverboat Rhythm (1946)
- Genius at Work (1946)
- The Bachelor and the Bobby-Soxer (1946)
- Crack-Up (1946)
- Born to Kill (1947)
- The Judge Steps Out (1948)
- Bodyguard (1948)
- The Miracle of the Bells (1948)
- Make Mine Laughs (1949)
- Home of the Brave (1949)
- A Dangerous Profession (1949)
- Follow Me Quietly (1949)
- Adventure in Baltimore (1949)
- A Kiss for Corliss (1949)
- The Clay Pigeon (1949)
- The Men (1950)
- Double Dynamite (1951)
- Chicago Calling (1951)
- The First Legion (1951)
- Marry Me Again (1953)

== Awards and nominations ==
Year	Award	Category	Nominated work	Result	Ref.
1939	11th Academy Awards	Best Cinematography	Vivacious Lady	Nominated	
1958	10th Primetime Emmy Awards	Best Cinematography for Television	The Danny Thomas Show	Nominated	
