= Go West (1925 film) =

1925 film

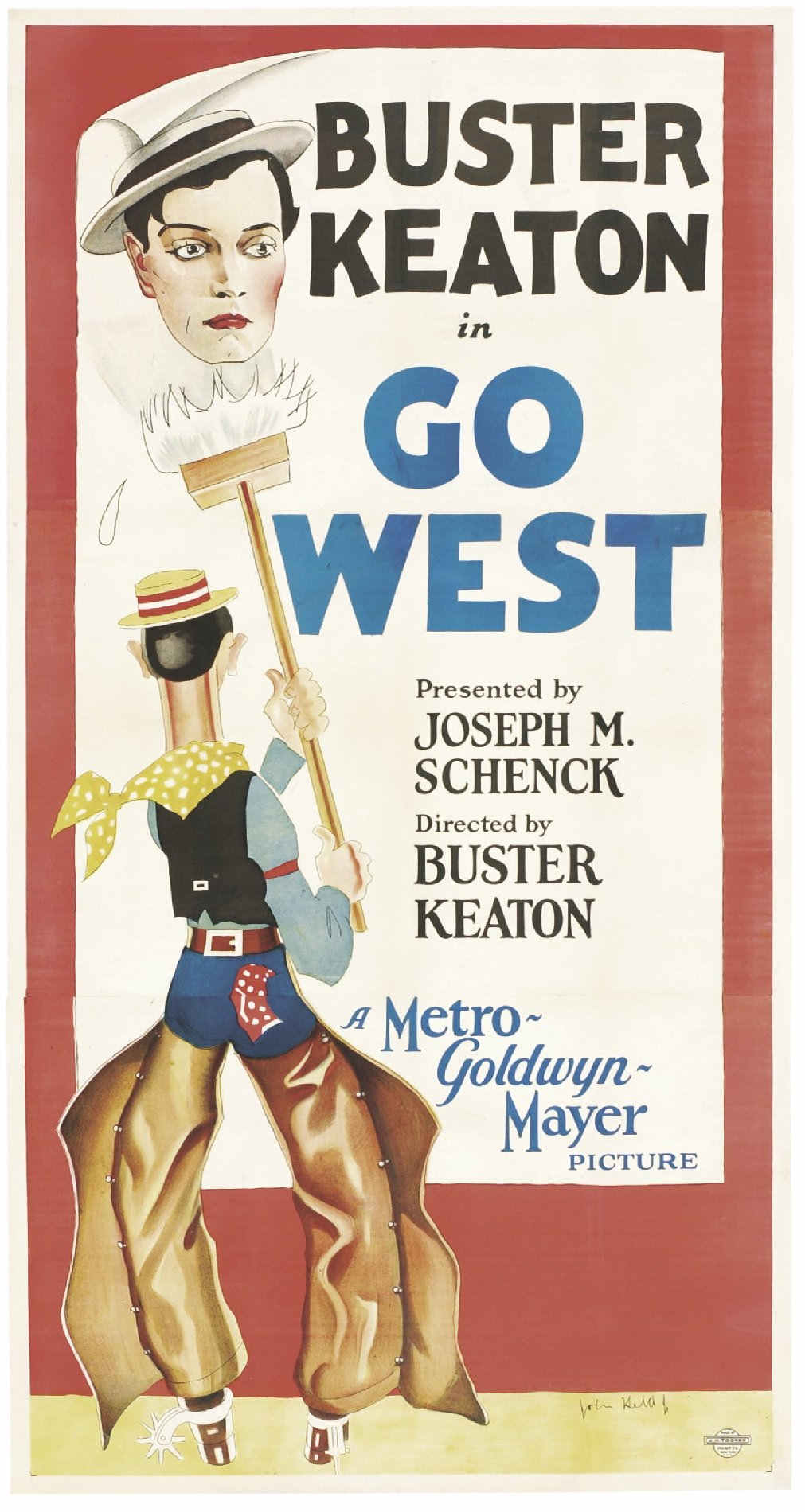
- Theatrical release poster
- Directed by: Buster Keaton
- Written by: Buster Keaton; Lex Neal
- Produced by: Buster Keaton; Joseph M. Schenck
- Starring: Buster Keaton; Kathleen Myers; Howard Truesdale; Ray Thompson
- Cinematography: Bert Haines; Elgin Lessley
- Music by: Konrad Elfers
- Production company: Buster Keaton Productions
- Distributed by: Metro-Goldwyn-Mayer
- Release date: November 1, 1925
- Running time: 83 minutes
- Country: United States
- Languages: Silent; English intertitles

Go West is a 1925 American silent Western comedy film directed by and starring Buster Keaton.

Keaton portrays Friendless, who travels west to try to make his fortune. Once there, he tries his hand at bronco-busting, cattle wrangling and dairy farming, eventually forming a bond with a cow named "Brown Eyes." Eventually he finds himself leading a herd of cattle through Los Angeles.

== Plot ==
Go West (1925)

A drifter identified only as "Friendless" sells the last of his possessions, keeping only a few trinkets and a picture of his mother.

Unable to find a job in the city, he stows away on a train heading for New York. Upon arriving, he gets trampled by the crowds on the busy streets. He hitches a train heading west towards California. During the journey, he sleeps inside a barrel, but the barrel rolls off the train. He manages to get a job at a cattle ranch despite having no experience. Meanwhile, a neglected cow named Brown Eyes fails to give milk and is sent out to the field along with the other cattle intended for slaughter.

As Friendless tries to figure out how to milk a cow, he is told to get a horse and help the other ranch hands bring in the cattle. He instead saddles up a mule, quickly falls off and sees Brown Eyes. Noticing her limp, Friendless removes a rock from her hoof. Brown Eyes proceeds to follow Friendless around, saving him from a bull attack. Realizing that he has finally found a companion, Friendless gives her his blanket at night and attempts to protect her from wild dogs. The next day, Brown Eyes follows Friendless everywhere, much to the chagrin of the other ranch hands. Friendless accidentally sets two steers loose, but at the joking suggestion of the other hands, brings them back in by waving his red bandana.

The ranch owner and his daughter are preparing to sell the cattle to a stockyard, though another rancher wants to hold out for a higher price. The owner, unwilling to wait, prepares to ship the whole herd out. Friendless, shocked to hear that Brown Eyes will go to a slaughterhouse, refuses to let her go. The ranch owner fires him and gives him his wages. Friendless tries to buy his friend back with his earnings, but is told that it is not enough. After failing to get more money from a card game, he joins Brown Eyes in the cattle car and tries to find a way to free her. The train is ambushed by the other rancher and his men. Friendless and the ranch owner's hands manage to drive off the attackers, but only Friendless makes it back to the train as the others chase away the rancher.

Arriving in Los Angeles, Friendless frees Brown Eyes and leads her away, using his red bandana once more to guide the thousand steers to the stockyard. The townspeople become terrified, as some of the cows break away and begin entering the stores, but Friendless manages to corral them. Friendless ties Brown Eyes up before going back to retrieve the other cattle, leaving his red bandana with her in order to keep her cool. Realizing his mistake, he enters a masquerade store to find something red to attract the cows. Deciding on a red devil's outfit, he exits the store and the cattle begin to chase him. The police attempt to arrest him, but are mistakenly sprayed with hoses by the fire department, who flee once they see the cattle coming.

The ranch owner, realizing he will be ruined if the cattle are not sold, drives with his daughter to the stockyard. When he sees Friendless leading the herd into the stockyard, the ranch owner tells Friendless that his house and anything he owns is his for the asking. Friendless says that he only wants "her," gesturing behind him to where the ranch owner's daughter is. The owner is surprised and the daughter flattered, but they quickly realize that he is referring to Brown Eyes. The three drive back to the ranch, with Brown Eyes beside Friendless in the back seat.

== Cast ==
- Buster Keaton as Friendless
- Howard Truesdale as Ranch owner
- Kathleen Myers as Ranch owner's daughter
- Ray Thompson as Ranch foreman
- Brown Eyes as The Cow "Brown Eyes"
- Joe Keaton as Man in Barber Shop (uncredited)
- Gus Leonard as General store owner (uncredited)
- Babe London as Woman in department store (uncredited)
- Roscoe "Fatty" Arbuckle as Woman in department store (uncredited)

== See also ==
- Buster Keaton filmography
- List of Western films of the 1920s
