= Good Men and True =

1922 film

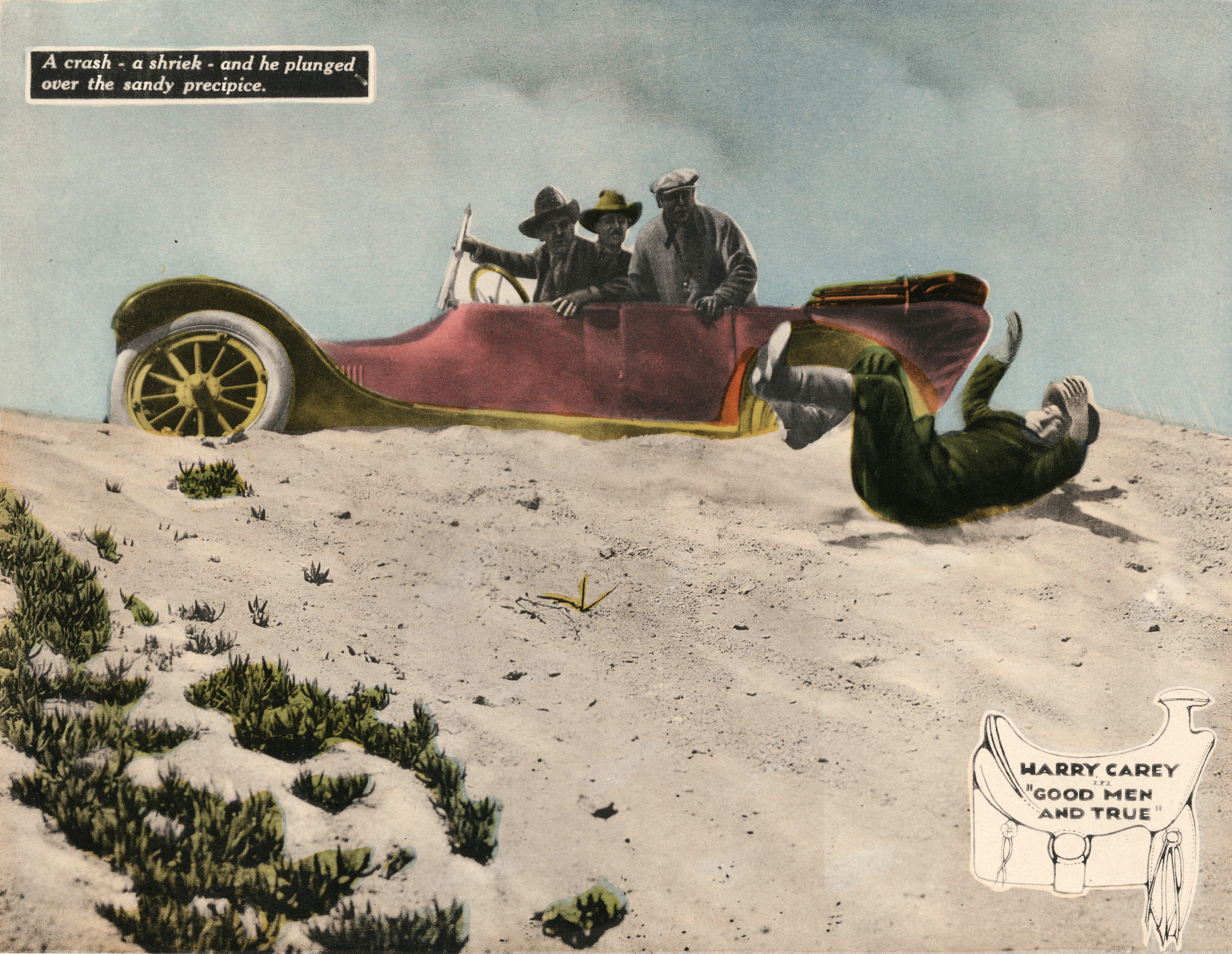
- Lobby card for film
- Directed by: Val Paul
- Written by: George Edwardes-Hall; Eugene Manlove Rhodes
- Produced by: Robertson-Cole
- Starring: Harry Carey, Sr. Noah Beery, Sr. Tully Marshall
- Cinematography: Robert De Grasse; William Thornley
- Distributed by: Film Booking Offices of America
- Release date: November 5, 1922
- Country: United States
- Languages: Silent; English intertitles

Good Men and True is a lost 1922 American silent Western film starring Harry Carey. The film was directed by Val Paul and the supporting cast includes Noah Beery, Sr. and Tully Marshall.

== Cast ==
- Harry Carey as J. Wesley Pringle
- Vola Vale as Georgie Hibbler
- Thomas Jefferson as Simon Hibbler
- Noah Beery as S.S. Thorpe
- Charles Le Moyne as Bowerman (credited as Charles J. LeMoyne)
- Tully Marshall as Fite
- Helen Gilmore as Mrs. Fite

== See also ==
- Harry Carey filmography
