= Single-hander =

Single-hander may refer to:

- Single-hander (EastEnders), an episode of EastEnders in which only one character is featured
- One who practices single-handed sailing

== See also ==
- Single Handed (disambiguation)
