= The Freeze-Out =

1921 film directed by John Ford

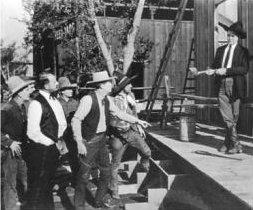
- Harry Carey in the film
- Directed by: John Ford
- Written by: George C. Hull
- Starring: Harry Carey; Helen Ferguson
- Cinematography: Harry M. Fowler
- Distributed by: Universal Film Manufacturing Company
- Release date: April 9, 1921
- Running time: 50 minutes
- Country: United States
- Languages: Silent; English intertitles

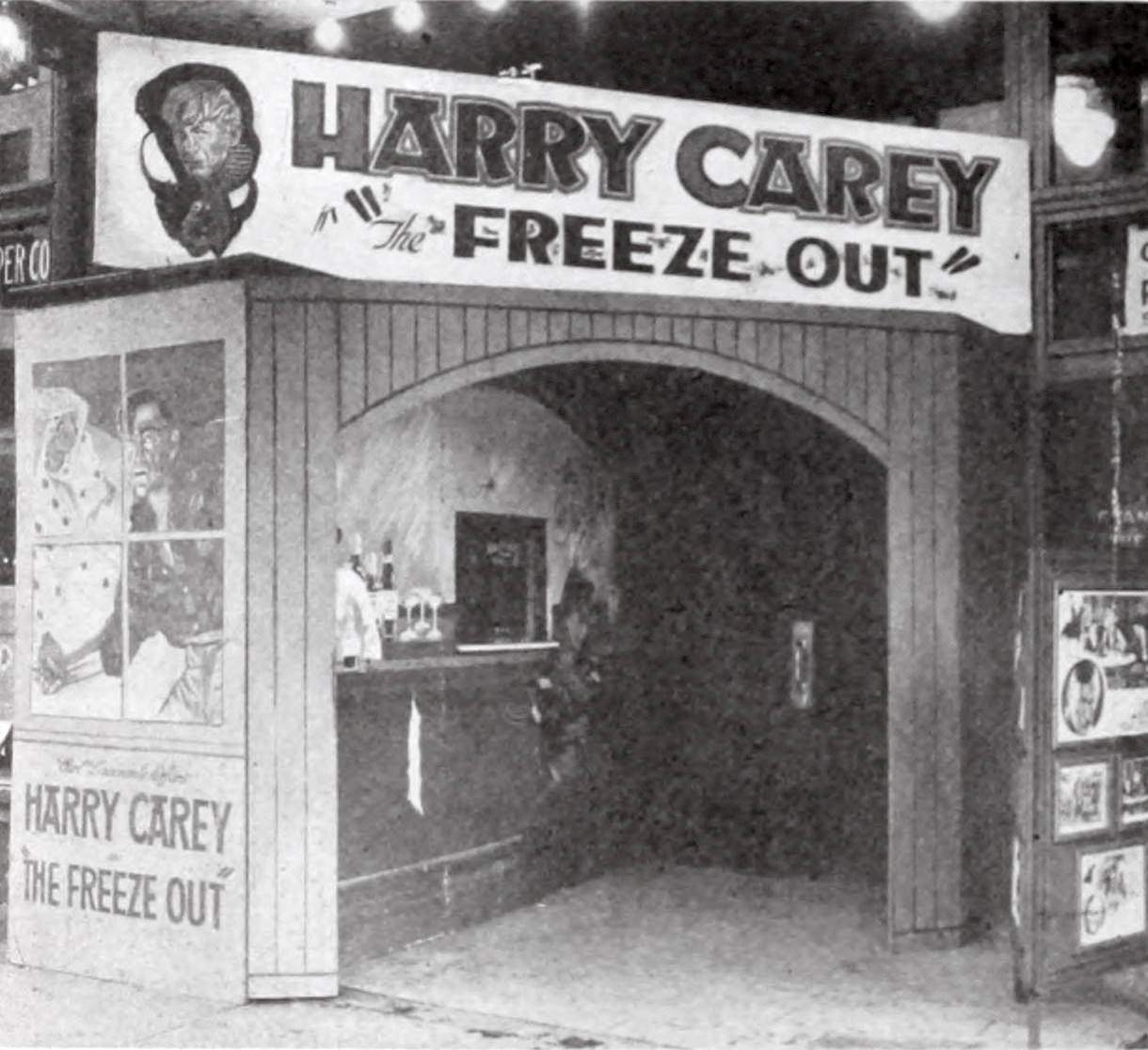
A lobby display for the film at the Standard Theater in Cleveland, Ohio

The Freeze-Out is a 1921 American silent Western film directed by John Ford and starring Harry Carey. The film is considered to be a lost film.

== Plot ==
As described in a film publication summary, the Stranger (Carey) comes to town of Broken Buckle to start a gambling hall. The Headlight, the existing gambling hall, is crooked, and the Stranger wants to start a straight one. He meets Zoe Whipple (Ferguson) who is attempting to reform the town and teaches school out of her home. Misunderstandings arise between the Stranger and Zoe that are brought about by Denver Red (Le Moyne), proprietor of the Headlight. After Zoe pleads with the Stranger not to start a new gambling den, the Stranger opens it to the public, but it turns out to be a new library and school. After running Denver out of town, the Stranger wins Zoe.

== Cast ==
- Harry Carey as Ohio, The Stranger
- Helen Ferguson as Zoe Whipple
- Joe Harris as "Headlight" Whipple
- Charles Le Moyne as "Denver Red"
- J. Farrell MacDonald as "Bobtail" McGuire
- Lydia Yeamans Titus as Mrs. McGuire

== See also ==
- Harry Carey filmography
- List of lost films
