= Joe Harris (actor) =

American actor

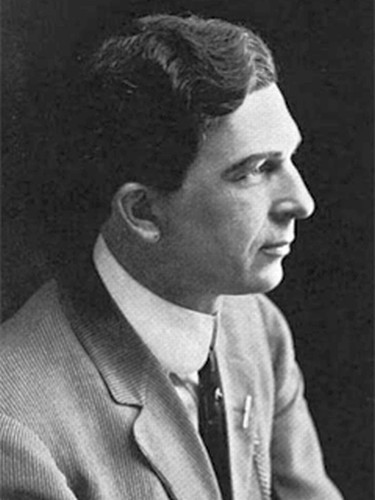
- Born: January 11, 1870; Lewiston, Maine
- Died: June 11, 1953 (aged 83); Hollywood, California
- Occupation: Actor
- Years active: 1913–1923

Joe Harris (January 11, 1870 - June 11, 1953) was an American actor, who between 1913 and 1923 appeared in at least 94 silent films, many of them cowboy westerns. He often played villains opposite early cowboy star Harry Carey.

== Biography ==
Harris was born Joseph Harris on January 11, 1870, in Lewiston, Maine to Irish parents. His first major film roles were in Hollywood productions by Venus Features where he was one of the stock actors for Powers Picture Plays, which was owned by film producer Pat Powers. He ultimately became friends with cowboy silent film star Harry Carey, for whom he worked as a hired hand. He became one of the members of John Ford's stock company at Universal Pictures and ultimately appeared with Carey in about twenty silent Westerns. He and Carey remained lifelong friends, and he lived with Carey and his family for most of his life. He died at the age of 83 on June 11, 1953, in Hollywood, California at the house of Harry Carey Jr.

== Partial filmography ==
- The Shadow of Nazareth (1913)
- A Florentine Tragedy (1913)
- Withering Roses (1914)
- The Bride of Lamermoore (1914)
- Fooling Uncle (1914)
- Bess, The Outcast (1914)
- Sally's Elopement (1914)
- Mary Magdalene (1914)
- The Wife (1914)
- The Sacrifice (1914)
- The Professor's Awakening (1914)
- Italian Love (1914)
- Elsie Venner (1914)
- The Peacock's Feather Fan (1914)
- Retribution (1914)
- Mlle. La Mode (1914)
- The Man Who Came Back (1914)
- Eugenics Vs. Love (1914)
- Her Heritage (1914)
- The Courting of Prudence (1914)
- Jane, The Justice (1914)
- Susie's New Shoes (1914)
- The Devil's Assistant (1917)
- Three Mounted Men (1918)
- Humdrum Brown (1918)
- Hell Bent (1918)
- A Fight for Love (1919)
- Bare Fists (1919)
- Riders of Vengeance (1919)
- Marked Men (1919)
- The Outcasts of Poker Flat (1919)
- Ace of the Saddle (1919)
- A Gun Fightin' Gentleman (1919)
- Overland Red (1920)
- Bullet Proof (1920)
- Human Stuff (1920)
- Hitchin' Posts (1920)
- The Freeze-Out (1921)
- Red Courage (1921)
- The Bearcat (1922)
- For Big Stakes (1922)
- Crashin' Thru (1923)
