= The Wallop =

1921 film directed by John Ford

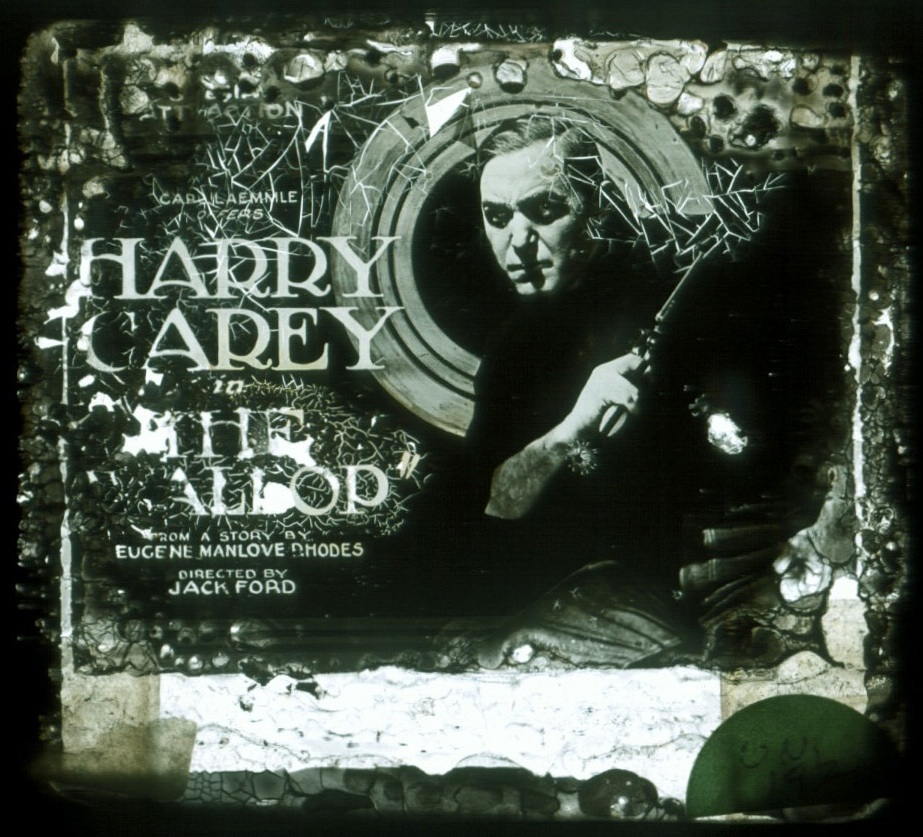
- Damaged lantern slide for the film.
- Directed by: John Ford
- Written by: George C. Hull; Eugene Manlove Rhodes
- Produced by: John Ford
- Starring: Harry Carey
- Cinematography: Harry M. Fowler
- Distributed by: Universal Film Manufacturing Company
- Release date: May 9, 1921
- Running time: 50 minutes
- Country: United States
- Languages: Silent; English intertitles

The Wallop is a 1921 American silent Western film directed by John Ford and starring Harry Carey. The film is considered to be lost.

== Plot ==
As described in a film publication, John Wesley Pringle, an adventurer, returns to Gadsden to claim the girl Stella, only to find out that she is in love with Chris Foy.

Chris has been accused of a murder that he did not commit. Sheriff Matt Lisner searches Stella's house for Chris but finds out that he is hiding in the mountains. Sheriff Lisner and his crowd set off for the mountains to get Chris and claim a reward for his capture. John gets to the mountains by a back route and pretends to rescue Chris, but he surprises both the Sheriff and Chris by claiming the reward for himself.

John then orders Sheriff Lisner to release Chris, saying that this was all a ruse to rescue Chris and get him safely from the mountain top. John then reveals evidence which shows that Lisner is the real murderer, and Chris returns to Stella, while John goes on his way without ever revealing his love for the girl.

== Cast ==
- Harry Carey as John Wesley Pringle
- Mignonne Golden as Stella Vorhis
- William Steele as Christopher Foy (credited as William Gettinger)
- Charles Le Moyne as Matt Lisner
- Joe Harris as Barela
- C. E. Anderson as Applegate
- J. Farrell MacDonald as Neuces River
- Mark Fenton as Major Vorhis
- Noble Johnson as Espinol

== See also ==
- List of lost films
