= Human Stuff =

1920 film

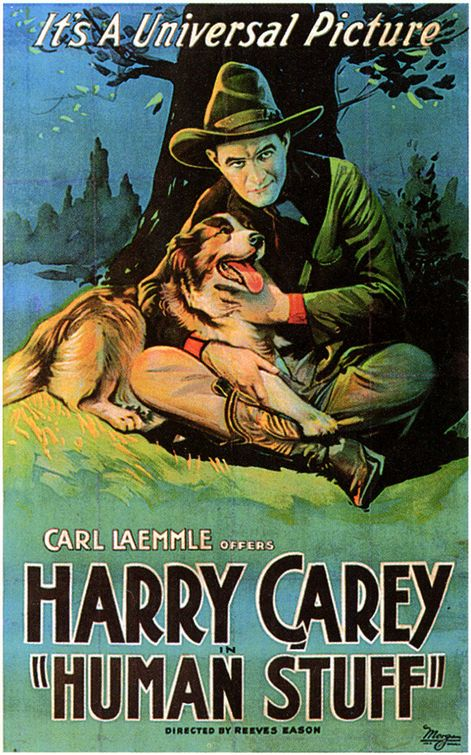
- Film poster
- Directed by: B. Reeves Eason
- Written by: Tarkington Baker; B. Reeves Eason; Harry Carey
- Produced by: Universal Pictures
- Starring: Harry Carey
- Cinematography: Roy H. Klaffki
- Distributed by: Universal Pictures
- Release date: June 28, 1920
- Country: United States
- Languages: Silent; English intertitles

Human Stuff is a 1920 American silent Western film produced and released by Universal Pictures, directed by B. Reeves Eason and starring Harry Carey. It is not known whether the film currently survives.

== Plot ==
Jim Pierce, an Easterner and son of a wealthy industrialist, dreams of Western adventure. He buys a struggling cattle ranch and turns it around by raising sheep which angers former foreman Ramero and cattle rancher Bull Elkins. Despite his success, Jim is lonely and asks his father to find him a wife. When Lee Tyndal a friend of Jim's sister, arrives looking to purchase a ranch, Jim believes she has been sent by his father as a potential bride. Offended, Lee escapes to Ramero's cabin, only to be captured by Elkins. Jim rescues her, and during the confrontation, Elkins is killed. Once the confusion is resolved, Lee and Jim marry, securing both her new ranch and his companionship.

== Cast ==
- Harry Carey as James "Jim" Pierce
- Rudolph Christians as "Washboard" Pierce
- Charles Le Moyne as Bull Elkins
- Joe Harris as Ramero
- Fontaine La Rue as Boka
- Ruth Fuller Golden as Jasmes' Sister
- Mary Charleson as Lee Tyndal
- Bobby Mack as The Butler

== See also ==
- Harry Carey filmography
