= Val Paul =

American actor

- Born: Vaughn Archibald Paul; April 10, 1886; Denver, Colorado, US
- Died: March 23, 1962 (aged 75); Hollywood, California, US
- Other name: Valentine Paul
- Occupation: Actor
- Years active: 1910–1948
- Spouse(s): Anna Louise Wey (m. 1907; div. 1913); Mary Palmer Bredell (née Nields) (alias May Foster Dabeney) (m. 1914; died 1950)

Vaughn Archibald "Val" Paul (April 10, 1886 – March 23, 1962) was an American actor and film director of the silent era. He appeared in 99 films between 1913 and 1922. He also directed 10 films between 1920 and 1932.

== Biography ==
Born in Denver, Colorado and raised in Salt Lake City, Utah, Paul was the son of Jenny and John J. Paul. He attended the Oquirrh School and Salt Lake High School.

== Personal life and death ==
In September 1907, Paul married fellow Salt Lake City resident Anna Louise Wey; they divorced in the summer of 1913. The following winter he exchanged vows with aspiring actress/writer May Foster Habeney (a.k.a. Mary Palmer Bredell, née Nields), with whom—in their sole joint screen appearance—he co-starred later that year in the 101 Bison two-reeler The Brand of His Tribe. Paul had two sons, those being Elwood Bredell—by his wife's first marriage—and Vaughn Austin Paul, who later had a brief film career composed primarily of assistant director stints but became best known during that period for his long-rumored elopement with—and short-lived marriage to—movie star Deanna Durbin.

Publicity of a more sobering sort was generated in 1935 at a "picnic" held in San Bernardino's Griffith Park, when Mrs. Paul's brother, Daniel Nields (with premeditation and in the presence of his 84-year-old prospective mother-in-law), fatally shot his girl friend, Hollywood stenographer Frances Conklin, for "teas[ing] me [for] loving my sister too much." a crime to which Nields ultimately pled guilty, resulting in a life sentence, served at San Quentin.

Predeceased by his wife, Paul died on March 23, 1962 at age 75 in Hollywood, California, survived by his son, his stepson, and four grandchildren.

== Selected filmography ==
- Suspense (1913)
- The Brand of His Tribe (1914)
- The College Orphan (1915)
- The Secret of the Swamp (1916)
- It Happened in Honolulu (1916)
- God's Crucible (1917)
- Mutiny (1917)
- The Lair of the Wolf (1917)
- Mr. Logan, U.S.A. (1918)
- Fame and Fortune (1918)
- Treat 'Em Rough (1919)
- Smiles (1919)
- The Girl from Nowhere (1919)
- Sundown Slim (1920 - directed)
- West Is West (1920 - directed)
- Hearts Up (1921 - directed)
- The Kickback (1922 - directed)
- The Timber Queen (1922)
- Good Men and True (1922 - directed)
- Canyon of the Fools (1923 - directed)
- Crashin' Thru (1923 - directed)
- Desert Driven (1923 - directed)
- The Miracle Baby (1923 - directed)
