= Desert Driven =

1923 film

- Directed by: Val Paul
- Written by: Wyndham Gittens
- Starring: Harry Carey
- Cinematography: Robert De Grasse; William Thornley
- Production company: Robertson-Cole
- Distributed by: Film Booking Offices of America
- Release date: July 8, 1923
- Country: United States
- Languages: Silent; English intertitles

Desert Driven is a 1923 American silent Western film starring Harry Carey.

== Cast ==
- Harry Carey as Bob
- Marguerite Clayton as Mary
- George Waggner as Craydon
- Charles Le Moyne as Leary (credited as Charles J. Le Moyne)
- Alfred Allen as Yorke
- Camille Johnson as "Ge-Ge"
- Dan Crimmins as Brown
- Catherine Kay as Wife
- Thomas G. Lingham as Sheriff (credited as Tom Lingham)
- Jack Carlyle as The Warden
- James Wang as Cook (credited as Jim Wang)
- Edward Cooper as Kendall

== Censorship ==
Before Desert Driven could be exhibited in Kansas, the Kansas Board of Review required the removal of many scenes, including multiple instances of violence and once scene of "dope" being folded in paper.

== See also ==
- Harry Carey filmography
