= The Kickback (film) =

1922 film

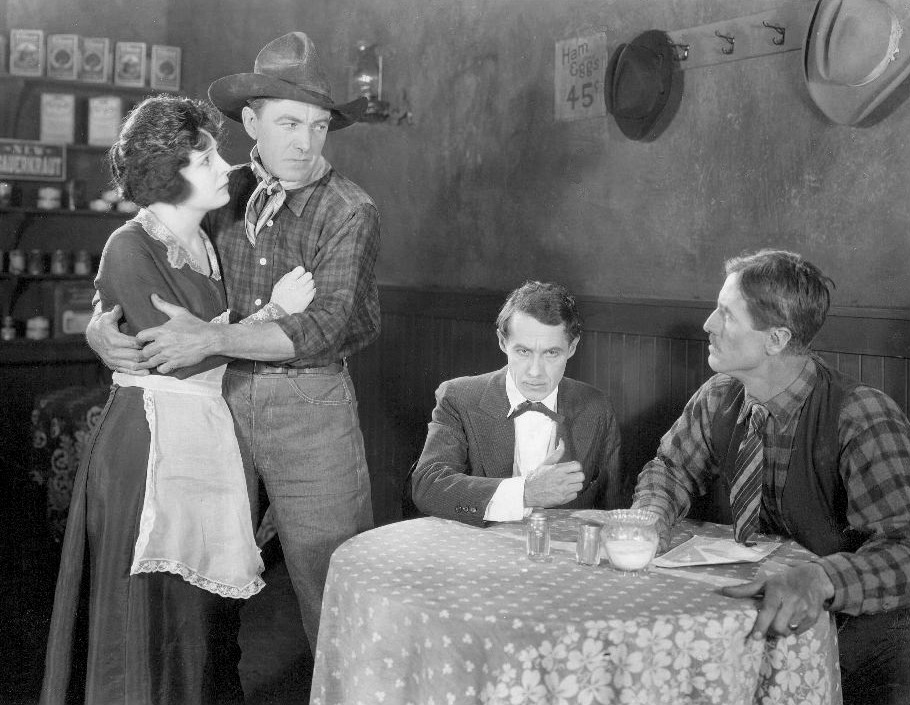
- Film still
- Directed by: Val Paul
- Written by: Harry Carey; George Edwardes-Hall
- Produced by: Pat Powers
- Starring: Harry Carey; Henry B. Walthall
- Cinematography: Robert De Grasse; Robert Thornby
- Distributed by: Film Booking Offices of America (FBO)
- Release date: July 1922
- Running time: 6 reels
- Country: United States
- Languages: Silent; English intertitles

The Kickback is a 1922 American silent Western film directed by Val Paul and starring Harry Carey and Henry B. Walthall.

== Plot ==
Aaron wishes to make Harry's land and girl his own. To do this, he sends Harry to Mexico with false papers for some horses. Harry gets arrested in Mexico, but soon escapes and returns home, where he is also arrested. Before he can be lynched, a Mexican girl brings the Texas Rangers to rescue him.

== Cast ==
- Harry Carey as Harry "White Horse Harry"
- Henry B. Walthall as Aaron Price
- Charles Le Moyne as Chaaalk Eye (credited as Charles J. Le Moyne)
- Vester Pegg as Ramon Pinellos
- Mignonne Golden as Conchita Pinellos
- Ethel Grey Terry as Nellie
- James O'Neill
