= Sure Fire =

1921 film directed by John Ford

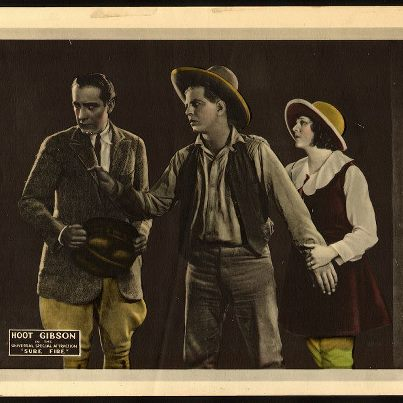
- Directed by: John Ford
- Written by: George C. Hull; Eugene Manlove Rhodes
- Starring: Hoot Gibson
- Cinematography: Virgil Miller
- Distributed by: Universal Film Manufacturing Company
- Release date: November 5, 1921
- Running time: 50 minutes
- Country: United States
- Languages: Silent; English intertitles

Sure Fire is a 1921 American silent Western film directed by John Ford and featuring Hoot Gibson. It is considered to be a lost film.

== Plot ==
As described in a film magazine, easy going rancher Jeff Bransford returns to his ancestral acres and finds them heavily mortgaged and about to be foreclosed and the hired men defended them with guns. He tries to borrow money to satisfy the mortgage but is unsuccessful. That night a robbery is committed on a neighboring farm with five thousand dollars stolen from Major Parker, and suspicion is thrown upon Jeff. After much hard riding and several stiff fights, the real culprits are apprehended and Jeff is vindicated. Parker had intended to loan Jeff some money to help with his difficulties. In return, Jeff saves the married Elinor Parker from running away with a worthless scamp and causing a scandal.

Lobby card

== Cast ==
- Hoot Gibson as Jeff Bransford
- Molly Malone as Marian Hoffman
- B. Reeves Eason Jr. as Sonny (credited as Breezy Eason Jr.)
- Harry Carter as Rufus Coulter
- Fritzi Brunette as Elinor Parker
- Murdock MacQuarrie as Major Parker
- George Fisher as Burt Rawlings
- Charles Newton as Leo Ballinger
- Jack Woods as Brazos Bart
- Jack Walters as Overland Kid
- Joe Harris as Romero
- Steve Clemente as Gomez (credited as Steve Clements)
- Mary Philbin

== Censorship ==
Before Sure Fire could be exhibited in Kansas, the Kansas Board of Review required the removal several scenes and intertitles. The scenes removed were of drawing from a deck of cards and of a girl being pursued around a room by a man. The intertitles eliminated said "We are both enslaved by your beauty," "Do you prefer the one outside," "We both worship the same shrine," and "One of us will leave at once."

== See also ==
- Hoot Gibson filmography
