= Headin' West =

1922 film

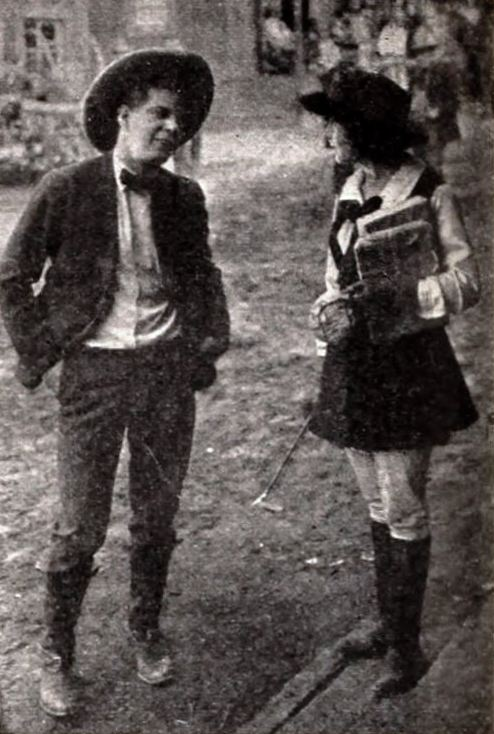
- Film still
- Directed by: William James Craft
- Written by: Harvey Gates
- Starring: Hoot Gibson
- Distributed by: Universal Pictures
- Release date: February 13, 1922
- Running time: 50 minutes
- Country: United States
- Languages: Silent; English intertitles

Headin' West is a 1922 American silent Western film directed by William James Craft and featuring Hoot Gibson. It is not known if the film survives.

== Plot ==
As described in a film magazine, Bill Perkins, a stowaway on a mail plane, escapes by parachuting with his dog onto a farm and, because he cannot ride the worst horse on the ranch, is assigned cooking duties with French cook Honey Giroux and his assistant Potato Polly. A young woman from the neighboring ranch, Ann Forest, takes an interest in Bill because he does not eat with his knife, which brings trouble on both of them from the ranch bully. When Ann is in town shopping, a burr is put under the saddle of her horse and it runs away with her. Bill, however, saves her and whips the bully, compelling him to apologize. The foreman, as a joke, makes Bill the owner of the ranch, but when it turns out that Bill really is the owner, the joke is on them.

== Cast ==
- Hoot Gibson as Bill Perkins
- Gertrude Short as Potato Polly
- Charles Le Moyne as Mark Rivers
- Jim Corey as Red Malone
- Leo White as Honey Giroux
- Louise Lorraine as Ann Forest
- George A. Williams as Barnaby Forest
- Frank Whitson as Stub Allen
- Mark Fenton as Judge Dean

== See also ==
- Hoot Gibson filmography
