= Man to Man (1922 film) =

1922 film

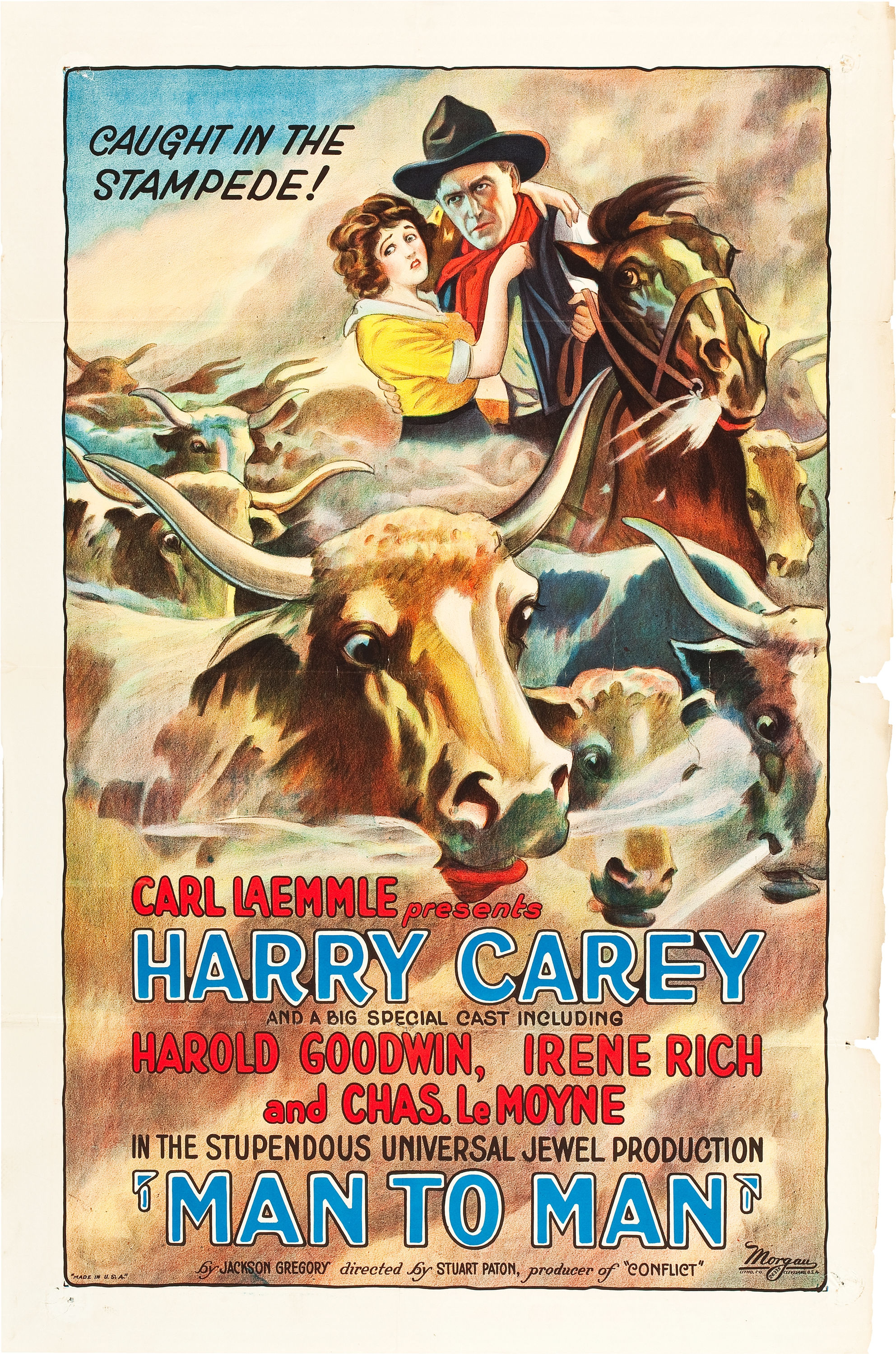
- Poster
- Directed by: Stuart Paton
- Written by: George C. Hull
- Based on: Man to Man; 1920 novel by Jackson Gregory
- Produced by: Carl Laemmle
- Starring: Harry Carey
- Cinematography: William Fildew
- Release date: March 20, 1922
- Running time: 60 minutes
- Country: United States
- Languages: Silent; English intertitles

Man to Man is a 1922 American silent Western film starring Harry Carey. It is not known whether the film currently survives.

== Plot ==
As described in a film magazine, ex-jailbird and derelict Steve Packard (Carey) is in the South Seas when he receives word of the death of his father and instruction to return and assume charge of the ranch left to him. On his arrival he learns that his grandfather has designs on the ranch. In his scheme to obtain it, the grandfather is abetted by Joe Blenham (Le Moyne), the foreman on Steve's ranch. Steve discovers Joe is double-crossing him when the latter attempts to rob Steve of some money. After a realistic Western rough and tumble fight, Steve leaves the ranch to return to the elder Packard. In his courtship of Terry Temple (Rich), who lives on a neighboring ranch, Steve is handicapped by his reputation from his past. She asks him to allow her to graze her cattle on some extra land he has obtained belonging to the elder Packard, in a transaction Steve believes to be perfectly legitimate. When the elder Packard learns of the grazing, he plans to stampede the cattle over a precipice. Steve and Terry go to a perilous position in front of the herd in an attempt to head them off. Steve proves he is a real man by saving Terry and her cattle. When the elder Packard learns that Steve really believed the land was his, the scheming of Joe comes to light. In a fist fight at the edge of a cliff, Steve throws Joe over the precipice. Steve and his grandfather are reconciled, and the courtship with Terry is now smooth sailing.

== Cast ==
- Harry Carey as Steve Packard
- Lillian Rich as Terry Temple
- Charles Le Moyne as Joe Blenham
- Harold Goodwin as "Slim" Barbee
- Willis Robards as Bill Royce
