= Arthur Millett =

American actor

- Born: Arthur Nelson Millett; April 21, 1874; Pittsfield, Maine, U.S.
- Died: February 24, 1952 (aged 77); Los Angeles, California, U.S.
- Occupation: Film actor
- Years active: 1914–1940
- Spouse: Neva Gerber

Arthur Nelson Millett (April 21, 1874 in Pittsfield, Maine – February 24, 1952 in Los Angeles, California), was an early American motion picture actor whose career was at its height in the silent film era.

== Biography ==
Born in 1874, Millett was signed on to appear in his first film relatively late in life at age 40 in 1914, but immediately work began to pick up. His first film The Lost Treasure was released in 1914. In 1915, he starred in films such as Coals of Fire and The Law of the Wilds, working with prolific actors such as Harry von Meter and Vivian Rich.

Millett starred in a total of 116 film in his career. With the advent of sound films, however, his career declined significantly. In the majority of the roles in his 60 or so films after 1927, Millett was uncredited.

Millett was married to actress Neva Gerber. He retired from film in 1940 and died in 1952.

== Partial filmography ==
- Coals of Fire (1915)
- The Law of the Wilds (1915)
- The Hidden Spring (1917)
- Madame Sphinx (1918)
- Shifting Sands (1918)
- Station Content (1918)
- Alias Mary Brown (1918)
- The Hand at the Window (1918)
- Her American Husband (1918)
- Todd of the Times (1919)
- Bare-Fisted Gallagher (1919)
- The Egg Crate Wallop (1919)
- West Is West (1920)
- Drag Harlan (1920)
- The Scuttlers (1920)
- Love Madness (1920)
- $30,000 (1920)
- Live Sparks (1920)
- Hearts Up (1921)
- Cold Steel (1921)
- The Match-Breaker (1921)
- A Broken Doll (1921)
- Tracked to Earth (1922)
- Gay and Devilish (1922)
- Around the World in Eighteen Days (1923)
- A Man of Action (1923)
- Yankee Madness (1924)
- The White Sin (1924)
- American Manners (1924)
- Mistaken Orders (1925)
- The Crimson Runner (1925)
- The Buckaroo Kid (1926)
- Glenister of the Mounted (1926)
- The Two-Gun Man (1926)
- The Glorious Fourth (1927)
- Wolf's Clothing (1927)
- Shootin' Irons (1927)
- Range Courage (1927)
- The Body Punch (1929)
- Desert Vengeance (1931)
- The Widow in Scarlet (1932)
- Hidden Valley (1932)
- No Living Witness (1932)
- Honor of the Mounted (1932)
- The County Fair (1932)
- Winds of the Wasteland (1936)
- The Fugitive Sheriff (1936)
- The Lion's Den (1936)
