= Charles Le Moyne (actor) =

American actor

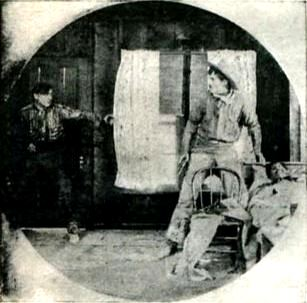
- Harry Carey and Charles Le Moyne in Sundown Slim (1920)
- Born: Carl Jonathan Lemon; June 27, 1880; Marshall, Illinois, United States
- Died: September 13, 1956 (aged 76); Hollywood, California, United States
- Occupation: Actor
- Years active: 1915-1937

Charles Le Moyne (June 27, 1880 – September 13, 1956) was an American motion picture actor of the silent era. He appeared in 73 films between 1915 and 1937.

== Biography ==
He was born Carl Jonathan Lemon at Marshall, Illinois, on June 27, 1880, the son of Charles and Clara (née Martin) Lemon. Charles Lemon was a stonemason who later moved his family to Los Angeles where he worked as a railroad conductor. Le Moyne was a favorite of actor/director Harry Carey, who once said that if Le Moyne was ever not available to play the heavy in one of his films, he would rather postpone production until the actor became free. Le Moyne died in Hollywood, California on September 13, 1956, and was survived by two daughters and a son.

== Selected filmography ==
- The Princess of Patches (1917)
- Treat 'Em Rough (1919)
- Marked Men (1919)
- The Coming of the Law (1919)
- Overland Red (1920)
- Bullet Proof (1920)
- Human Stuff (1920)
- Blue Streak McCoy (1920)
- Sundown Slim (1920)
- West Is West (1920)
- Hearts Up (1921)
- The Freeze-Out (1921)
- The Wallop (1921)
- Colorado (1921)
- The Fox (1921)
- Headin' West (1922)
- Man to Man (1922)
- The Kickback (1922)
- Good Men and True (1922)
- Roughshod (1922)
- Canyon of the Fools (1923)
- Crashin' Thru (1923)
- Desert Driven (1923)
- Riders of the Purple Sage (1925)
- The Apache Kid's Escape (1930)
- The Lone Rider (1930)
- Haunted Gold (1932)
- Hell Fire Austin (1932)
- Somewhere in Sonora (1933)
- King of the Wild Horses (1933)
- Empty Saddles (1936)
- Law for Tombstone (1937)
