= Overland Red =

1920 film

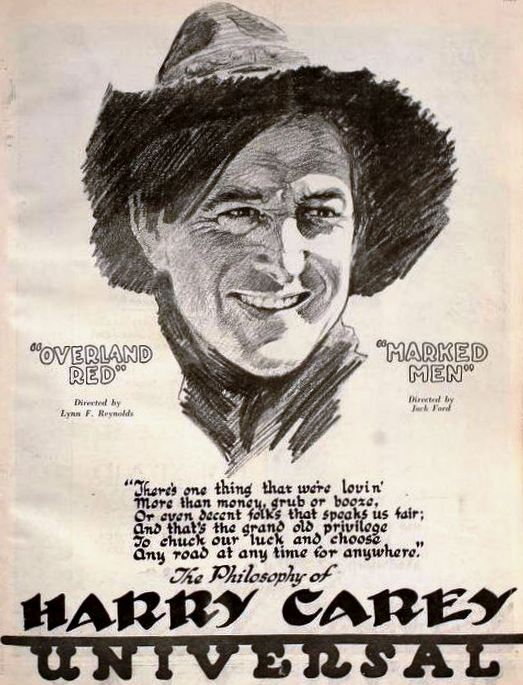
- Ad with Harry Carey noting release of film
- Directed by: Lynn Reynolds
- Written by: Henry H. Knibbs; Lynn Reynolds
- Starring: Harry Carey
- Cinematography: Hugh McClung
- Distributed by: Universal Film Manufacturing Company
- Release date: March 22, 1920
- Running time: 60 minutes
- Country: United States
- Languages: Silent; English intertitles

Overland Red is a 1920 American silent Western film directed by Lynn Reynolds and starring Harry Carey. A print exists at Cineteca Nazionale.

== Plot ==
As described in a film magazine, Overland Red, a "knight of the road," and his young pal Collie find a prospector dead in the desert. On his body they discover papers giving the location of a gold mine. The sheriff of a western town and his accomplices are seeking the mine. Overland and Collie are arrested but the papers are not found on them. The sheriff plans on charging Overland with murder, hoping that he will then disclose the location of the mine. The two knights of the road escape, however, and are found on the Alacarme ranch by Louise, whom they had seen from the observation car of a train. Collie is in love with Louise and at her suggestion remains at the ranch. Overland is sought by the sheriff, but her evades him until one day Collie is shot by the sheriff's accomplices. A fight ensues and the sheriff is killed. Collie and Louise are happy in their love, and Overland departs, happy that he brought the two together.

== Cast ==
- Harry Carey as "Overland Red"
- Charles Le Moyne as "Silent" Saunders
- Harold Goodwin as Collie
- Vola Vale as Louise Alacarme
- David B. Gally as Billy Winthrop
- C. E. Anderson as Boggs (credited as C. Anderson)
- Joe Harris as Sago
- J. Morris Foster

== See also ==
- Harry Carey filmography
