= Desperate Trails (1921 film) =

1921 film directed by John Ford

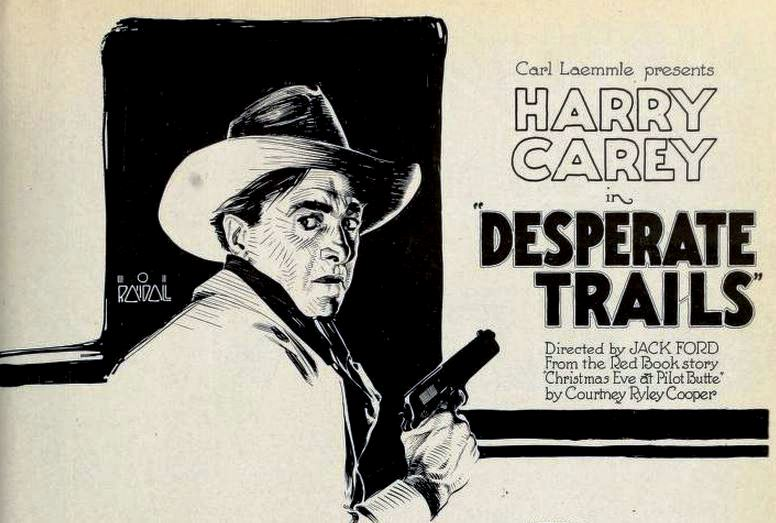
- Directed by: John Ford
- Written by: Elliott J. Clawson; Courtney Ryley Cooper
- Starring: Harry Carey; Irene Rich; Barbara La Marr
- Cinematography: Robert De Grasse; Harry M. Fowler
- Distributed by: Universal Film Manufacturing Company
- Release date: July 9, 1921
- Running time: 50 minutes
- Country: United States
- Languages: Silent; English intertitles

Desperate Trails is a 1921 American silent Western film directed by John Ford and featuring Harry Carey. The film is considered to be lost.

== Plot ==
As described in a film publication, Bart Carson is in love with Lou and even goes to jail to save Walter A. Walker, a man she says is her brother but who is really a husband who has deserted his wife and two children. After he learns the truth, Bart breaks out of jail and trails Walter, who falls off a train trying to escape. Bart then seeks refuge in a cabin with Mrs. Walker, where he is captured, but the officials have learned the truth and promise him a pardon.

== Cast ==
- Harry Carey as Bart Carson
- Irene Rich as Mrs. Walker
- George E. Stone as Dannie Boy
- Helen Field as Carrie
- Edward Coxen as Walter A. Walker
- Barbara La Marr as Lady Lou
- George Siegmann as Sheriff Price
- Charles Inslee as Doc Higgins

== Production and release ==
Courtney Ryley Cooper wrote the story Christmas Eve at Pilot Butte which was later purchased by the Universal Film Manufacturing Company. The screenplay was written by Elliott J. Clawson and directed by John Ford.

Filming of Desperate Trails started on March 14, 1921, under the working title of Christmas Eve at Pilot Butte, and lasted until April 11, with Harry C. Fowler and Robert De Grasse serving as the photographers. The movie was released on July 9.
