= The Miracle Baby =

1923 film

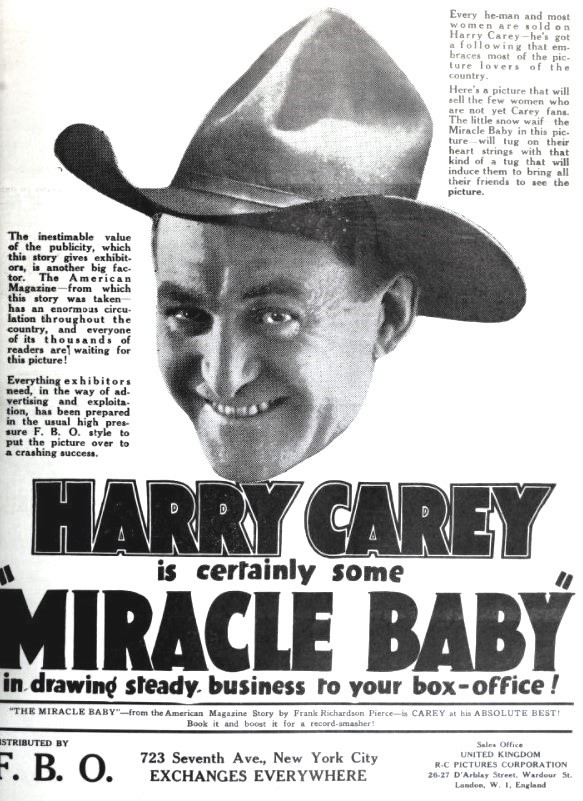
- Trade advertisement
- Directed by: Val Paul
- Written by: Isadore Bernstein; Jacques Jaccard
- Story by: Frank Richardson Pierce
- Starring: Harry Carey
- Cinematography: William Thornley
- Production company: Robertson-Cole Pictures Corporation
- Distributed by: Film Booking Offices of America
- Release date: August 19, 1923
- Running time: 6 reels
- Country: United States
- Languages: Silent; English intertitles

The Miracle Baby is a 1923 American silent Western film directed by Val Paul and starring Harry Carey. With no prints of The Miracle Baby located in any film archives, it is a lost film.

== Cast ==
- Harry Carey as Neil Allison
- Margaret Landis as Judy Stanton
- Charles J.L. Mayne as "Hopeful" Mason
- Edward Hearn as Hal Norton
- Hedda Nova as Violet
- Edmund Cobb as Jim Starke
- Alfred Allen as Dr. Amos Stanton
- Bert Sprotte as Sam Brodford

== Production ==
Location scenes with snow were filmed at Truckee, California.

== See also ==
- Harry Carey filmography
