= Crashin' Thru =

1923 film

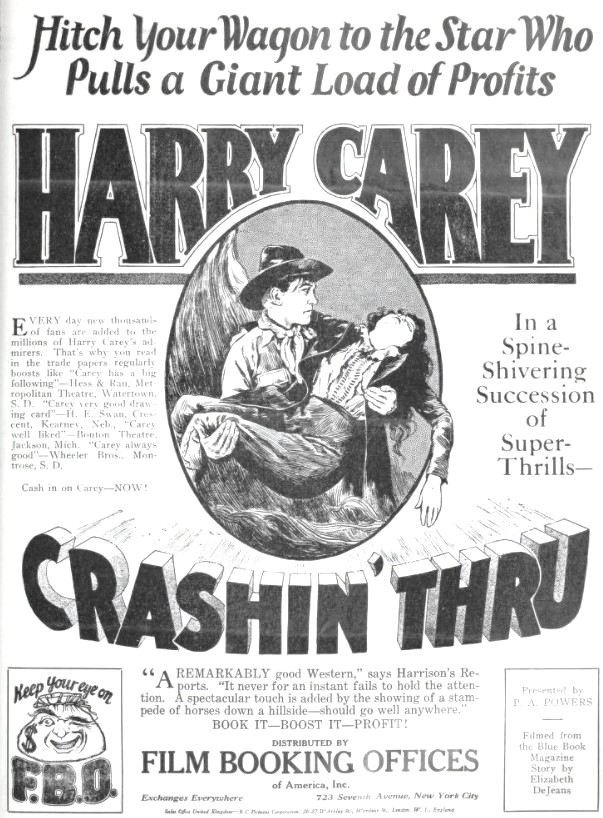
- Trade advertisement
- Directed by: Val Paul
- Written by: Elizabeth Dejeans; Beatrice Van
- Starring: Harry Carey
- Cinematography: Robert De Grasse; William Thornley
- Production company: Robertson-Cole
- Distributed by: Film Booking Offices of America
- Release date: April 1, 1923
- Running time: 6 reels
- Country: United States
- Languages: Silent; English intertitles

Crashin' Thru is a 1923 American silent Western film directed by Val Paul and starring Harry Carey. With no copies of Crashin' Thru located in any film archives, it is a lost film.

== Cast ==
- Harry Carey as Blake
- Cullen Landis as Cons Saunders
- Myrtle Stedman as Celia
- Vola Vale as Diane
- Charles Le Moyne as Saunders
- Winifred Bryson as Gracia
- Joe Harris as Holmes (credited as Joseph Harris)
- Donald MacDonald as Allison
- Charles Hill Mailes as Benedict

== See also ==
- Harry Carey filmography
