= Sundown Slim =

1920 film

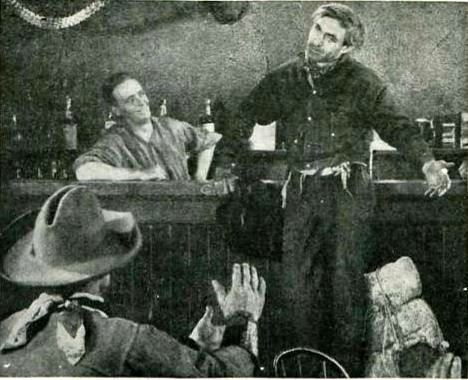
- Still from film
- Directed by: Val Paul
- Written by: Henry H. Knibbs
- Produced by: Harry Carey
- Starring: Harry Carey
- Cinematography: Harry M. Fowler
- Distributed by: Universal Film Manufacturing Company
- Release date: October 1920
- Running time: 5 reels (approximately 50 minutes)
- Country: United States
- Languages: Silent; English intertitles

Sundown Slim is a 1920 American silent Western film starring Harry Carey.

== Plot ==
"Sundown Slim" Hicks leaves his life of hobo-poet and starts in as ranch cook at the Concho cattle ranch owned by Jack Corliss. The adjoining sheep ranch is owned by David Loring. Fadeaway, a bad cowboy, insults Anita, daughter of the chief sheepherder, and Sundown exacts reprisal. Billy, Sundown's pal, is induced by Fadeaway to rob a bank. Sundown takes the blame and goes to jail. In the feud between sheepmen and cattlemen, Billy is nursed by Anita. The two learn to care for each other, and when Sundown is released from jail and goes to Anita, he sees the situation and surrenders her to Billy, again taking up to lone trail.

== Cast ==
- Harry Carey as Sundown Slim
- Genevieve Blinn as Mrs. Fernando
- Ted Brooks as Billy Corliss
- Frances Conrad as Eleanor Loring
- J. Morris Foster as Jack Corliss (as J.M. Foster)
- Mignonne Golden as Anita
- Joe Harris as Fernando (as Joseph Harris)
- Ed Jones as Sheriff
- Duke R. Lee as Loring (as Duke Lee)
- Charles Le Moyne as Fadeaway
- Otto Myers as Bud Shoop (as Otto Meyers)
- Ed Price as Shorty

== Still summary ==
The film was summarized using stills in the January 1921 Film Fun, an American Western film magazine.

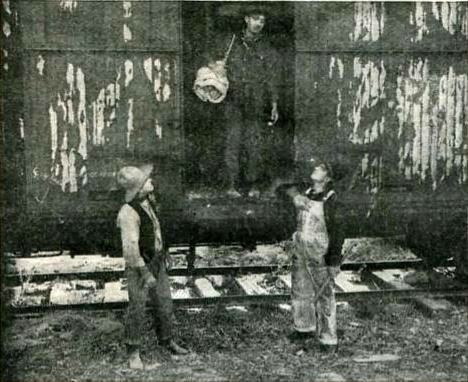
Out of a filthy boxcar, onto the clean open range, comes "Sundown Slim" Hicks.

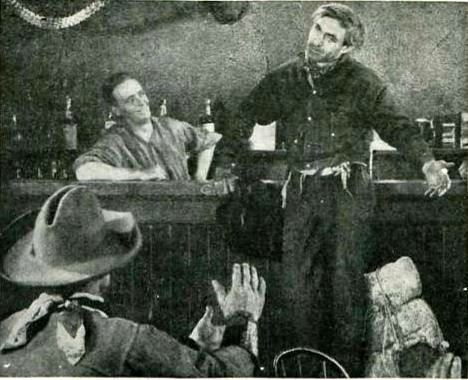
Before getting a job as a ranch cook, Sundown had been a tramp-poet.

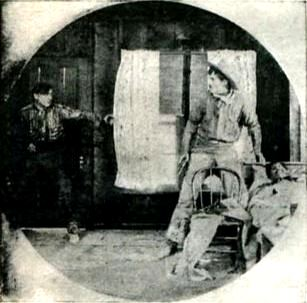
Fadaway, a bad cowboy, starts an unprofitable argument with Sundown.

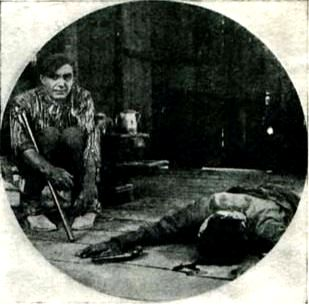
The argument culminates in the shooting of Fadeaway by Sundown.

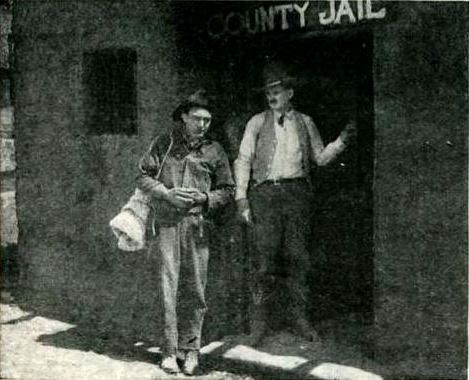
Sundown accepts the blame for a crime committed by a pal, and goes to jail." The Sheriff (right) was played by Ed Jones, an American actor active in films from 1914 to 1939.

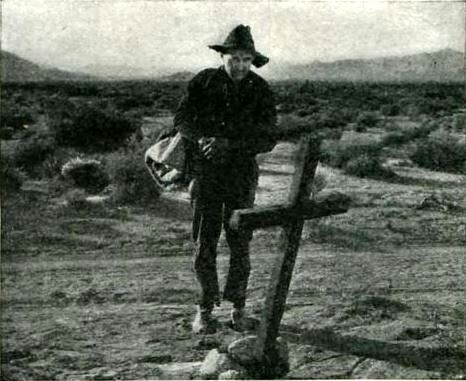
After it is all over, Sundown surrenders the girl to his pal, and starts on his lone journey.

== See also ==
- Harry Carey filmography
