= Blue Streak McCoy =

1920 film

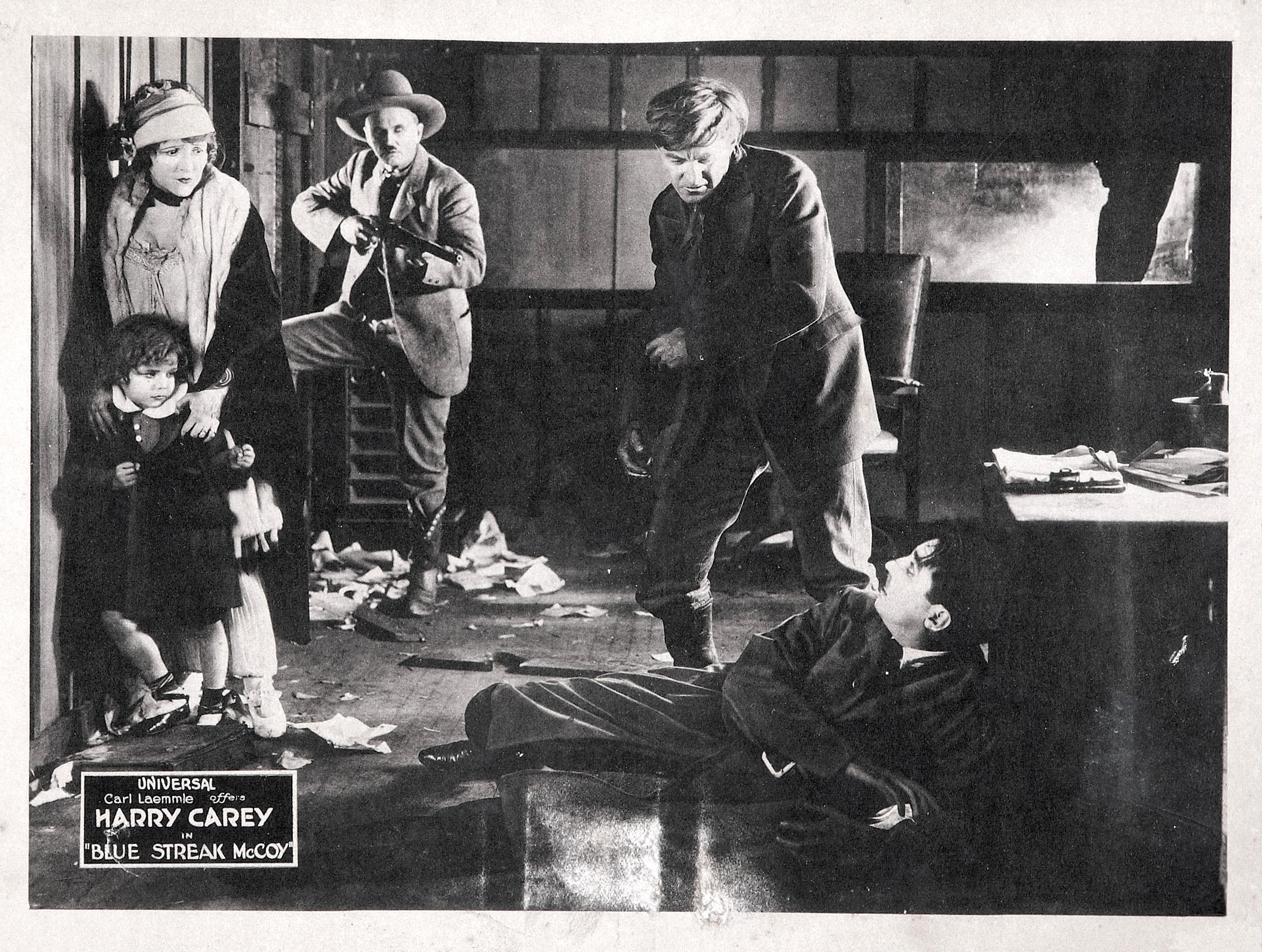
- Lobby card.
- Directed by: B. Reeves Eason
- Written by: Harvey Gates; H.H. Van Loan
- Starring: Harry Carey
- Cinematography: William Fildew
- Distributed by: Universal Studios
- Release date: August 23, 1920
- Country: United States
- Languages: Silent; English intertitles

Blue Streak McCoy is a lost 1920 American silent Western film starring Harry Carey.

== Cast ==
- Harry Carey as Job McCoy
- Lila Leslie as Eileen Marlowe
- Charles Arling as Howard Marlowe
- B. Reeves Eason, Jr. (credited as Breezy Eason) as Albert Marlowe
- Ruth Fuller Golden (credited as Ruth Golden) as Diana Hughes
- Ray Ripley as Frank Otis
- Charles Le Moyne as Mulhall
- Ruth Royce as Conchita
- Ben Alexander

== See also ==
- List of American films of 1920
- Harry Carey filmography
