= Bullet Proof (1920 film) =

1920 film

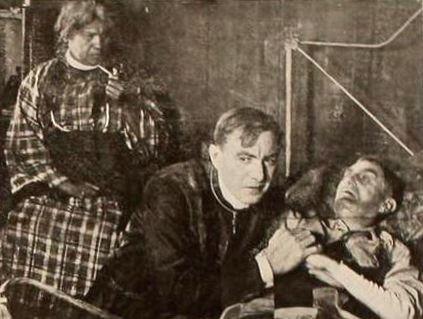
- Film still
- Directed by: Lynn Reynolds
- Written by: John Frederick; Lynn Reynolds
- Starring: Harry Carey
- Cinematography: John W. Brown; Hugh McClung
- Distributed by: Universal Pictures
- Release date: May 3, 1920
- Running time: 5 reels
- Country: United States
- Languages: Silent; English intertitles

Bullet Proof is a 1920 American silent Western film directed by Lynn Reynolds, starring Harry Carey. It is not known whether the film currently survives, and it may be a lost film.

== Plot ==
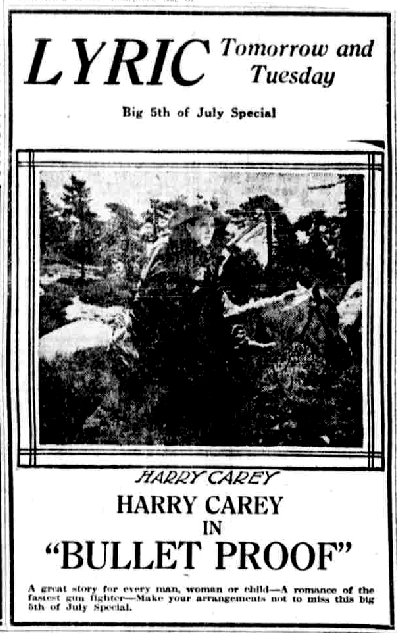
July 1920 newspaper ad for the film

As described in a film publication, to avenge his father's death Pierre Winton turns outlaw and joins a band of bandits headed by Jim Boone. McGuirk, a lone bandit, is the object of his search and war is declared between the lone rider and Boone's band. Pierre goes to a masquerade ball one night and returns to find every member of Boone's band dead except for Jim's daughter Jackie. Pierre gets on his horse to ride his enemy down to earth and see that vengeance is executed.

== Cast ==
- Harry Carey as Pierre Winton
- William Ryno as Father Victor
- Fred Gamble as Father Jacques
- Kathleen O'Connor as Mary Brown
- J. Farrell MacDonald as Jim Boone
- Beatrice Burnham as Jackie Boone
- Robert McKenzie as Dick Wilbur (credited as Bob McKenzie)
- Joe Harris as Bandit
- C.E. Anderson as Bandit (credited as Captain Anderson)
- Charles Le Moyne as Bandit
- Robert McKim as McGuirk

== See also ==
- List of American films of 1920
