= Eugene Manlove Rhodes =

American writer (1869–1934)

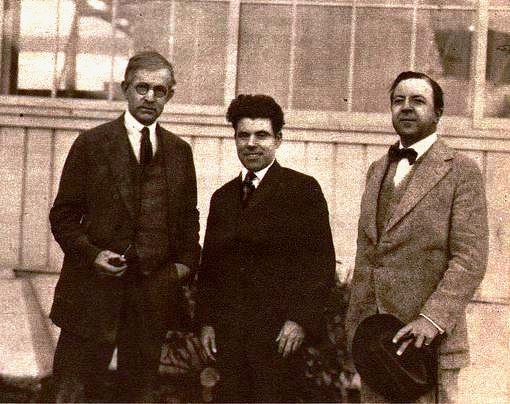
- Rhodes, Jim Tully, and Rupert Hughes in 1922
- Born: January 19, 1869; Tecumseh, Nebraska
- Died: June 27, 1934 (aged 65); Pacific Beach, California
- Resting place: New Mexico
- Education: University of the Pacific
- Occupation: Writer of the American West
- Spouse: May Louise Davison Purple (1899 to his death)
- Writing career
- Language: English
- Years active: 1881–1934
- Period: 1910–1934
- Genres: Western fiction, short stories and novels
- Subject: The American West
- Notable works: Short story Pasó Por Aquí; Novel Good men and true

Eugene Manlove Rhodes (January 19, 1869 – June 27, 1934) was an American writer, nicknamed the "cowboy chronicler". He lived in south central New Mexico when the first cattle ranching and cowboys arrived in the area; when he moved to New York with his wife in 1899, he wrote stories of the American West that set the image of cowboy life in that era. He moved back to New Mexico in 1926 and continued to write novels. In 1958, he was inducted into the Hall of Great Westerners of the National Cowboy & Western Heritage Museum.

== Biography ==
Rhodes was born in Tecumseh, Nebraska, to Hinman Rhodes and Julia Manlove who were wed March 5, 1868 at Rushville in Schuyler County, Illinois. He moved to New Mexico with his parents in 1881 and "fell in love" with the state. In 1883, Rhodes went to work for the Bar Cross Ranch, a period of employment that would form the basis of much of his subsequent writing.

By age sixteen, he was an accomplished horseman and stonemason and road builder. He helped build the road from Engle, New Mexico, to Tularosa, New Mexico.

Rhodes was an avid reader, and he was mostly self-educated in his youth. In 1888, he studied two years at the University of the Pacific in California. He began publishing anonymous works in the college newspaper. In 1890, he was unable to continue his studies due to financial problems.

His first non-anonymous work was the poem "Charlie Graham".

Rhodes gained a reputation for fighting. On May 20, 1892, the Rio Grande Republican newspaper reported that "Territory vs. Eugene Rhodes drawing a deadly weapon; case tried on Wednesday, and a verdict of guilty verdict returned." Rhodes' son, Alan, wrote that on another occasion Rhodes was assaulted by five gunmen during a stint ranching at San Andres, during which he sustained a head injury from the butt of a six-shooter. Alan believed that the head injury was responsible for much of Rhodes' subsequent irascibility.

In 1899, Rhodes married May Louise Davison Purple (1871–1957), a widow with two sons. Purple was also a writer, and in an article written for Reader's Digest described how Rhodes proposed to her the first day he met her and how he turned up for their marriage bearing evidence of a recent fight, including a torn ear; she also recorded that Rhodes brought her two marriage gifts, a silk scarf and a lady's pearl handle revolver. He spent the next two decades away from New Mexico at her home in Apalachin, New York. This period is often referred to as his "years of exile." He published seven novels during this time. He and his wife returned to New Mexico in 1926.

Despite his literary success, he was not financially successful. They spent less than a year living in Santa Fe. After that, they lived in Alamogordo. When they could no longer afford rent there, Albert Bacon Fall gave them a house at White Mountain near Three Rivers, New Mexico.

=== Body of work and critical reception ===
Most of Rhodes' works were published in newspapers and magazines before they were published individually, including Land of Sunshine, Out West, McClure's, Redbook, Sunset, and Cosmopolitan, and much of his fiction was serialized in The Saturday Evening Post prior to being published as a book. Rhodes published ten books between 1910 and 1935.

Rhodes' novels include Good Men and True (1910), West Is West (1917), Copper Streak Trail (1922) and Beyond the Desert (1934), and of his several novelettes, Pasó Por Aquí (1926) has been singled out as his masterpiece. One western writer describing Pasó Por Aquí as "the finest western ever written".

Respected author Jack Schaefer wrote of Rhodes' that, "The man's writing stimulates fanaticism, cultism. To the faithful, he could do no wrong... Certainly he mastered his material as few others in the field, in any field, have done."

An article in The New York Times expressed the view that, "Rhodes is the peer of Owen Wister in portraying the cowboy in his code, and often, though briefly and incidentally, the equal of such factual narrators as Andy Adams and Will James in presenting the mode of his working life. In variety and scope, he is the best of the four."

Film adaptions include The Wallop (1921) from Rhodes' The Girl He Left Behind Him and The Desire of the Moth; Sure Fire (1921) from Rhodes story Bransford of Rainbow Bridge; and Four Faces West (1949) from Pasó Por Aquí, one of very few westerns to not feature a gunfight.

Rhodes appears as a character in the historical fiction novel Hard Country (2012) by Michael McGarrity.

=== Land of enchantment ===
Rhodes is credited with inventing the phrase 'Land of Enchantment' to describe New Mexico. In 1911, he published A Number of Things, a story in which he described the Socorro area in 1900 as "A land of mighty mountains, far seen, gloriously tinted, misty opal, blue and amethyst; a land of enchantment and mystery. Those same opalescent hills, seen closer, are decked with barbaric colors—reds, yellows or pinks, brown or green or gray; but, from afar, shapes, and colors ebb and flow, altered daily, hourly, by subtle sorcery of atmosphere, distance, and angle; deepening, fading combining into new and fantastic forms and hues—to melt again as swiftly into others yet more bewildering."

He also used the phrase in the 1914 novelette Bransford In Arcadia, and it was later made the official state nickname of New Mexico. In 1937 the New Mexico Tourist Bureau published a sixteen-page pamphlet Welcome to the Land of Enchantment. The nickname also appeared on a road map that year. It had appeared earlier on Lilian Whiting's The Land of Enchantment: From Pike's Peak to the Pacific, published 1906, a dedication to Major John Wesley Powell, "the great explorer."

=== Papers ===
Alamogordo Public Library holds a collection of books, correspondence, clippings, magazines, and original manuscripts related to Rhodes. The library's Eugene Manlove Rhodes Room houses this collection and the library's other Southwest books.

== Death ==
In 1930, Rhodes's poor health forced the couple to move to Pacific Beach, California. He died on June 27, 1934. Per his request, he was buried in the San Andres Mountains. The canyon in which he is buried is now named after him. Rhodes Canyon is now part of the White Sands Missile Range.

His wife lived to 1957. His wife is buried in the Riverside Cemetery at Apalachin.

== Books ==
- Good Men and True. Illustrations by H. T. Dunn, 1910
- Bransford in Arcadia 1914
- Desire of the Moth and The Come On, illustrations by H.T. Dunn, 1916
- West is West, 1917
- Stepsons of Light, 1921
- Say now Shibboleth, 1921
- Copper Streak Trail 1922
- Once in the Saddle, and Pasó por aquí, 1927
- Trusty Knaves, 1933
- Penalosa, 1934
- Beyond the Desert, 1934
- The Proud Sheriff, 1935
- Little World Waddies, 1946
- Best Novels and Stories; edited by Frank V. Dearing. Introduction by J. Frank Dobie, 1949
- Sunset Land, 1955
- Bar Cross Man: The Life & Personal Writings of Eugene Manlove Rhodes [by] W.H. Hutchinson. 1956
- Rhodes Reader; Stories of Virgins, Villains, and Varmints. Selected by W. H. Hutchinson, 1957
- Recognition: The Poems of Eugene Manlove Rhodes / illustrated by Martha Julian, 1997
