= Single Handed (1923 film) =

1923 film directed by Edward Sedgwick

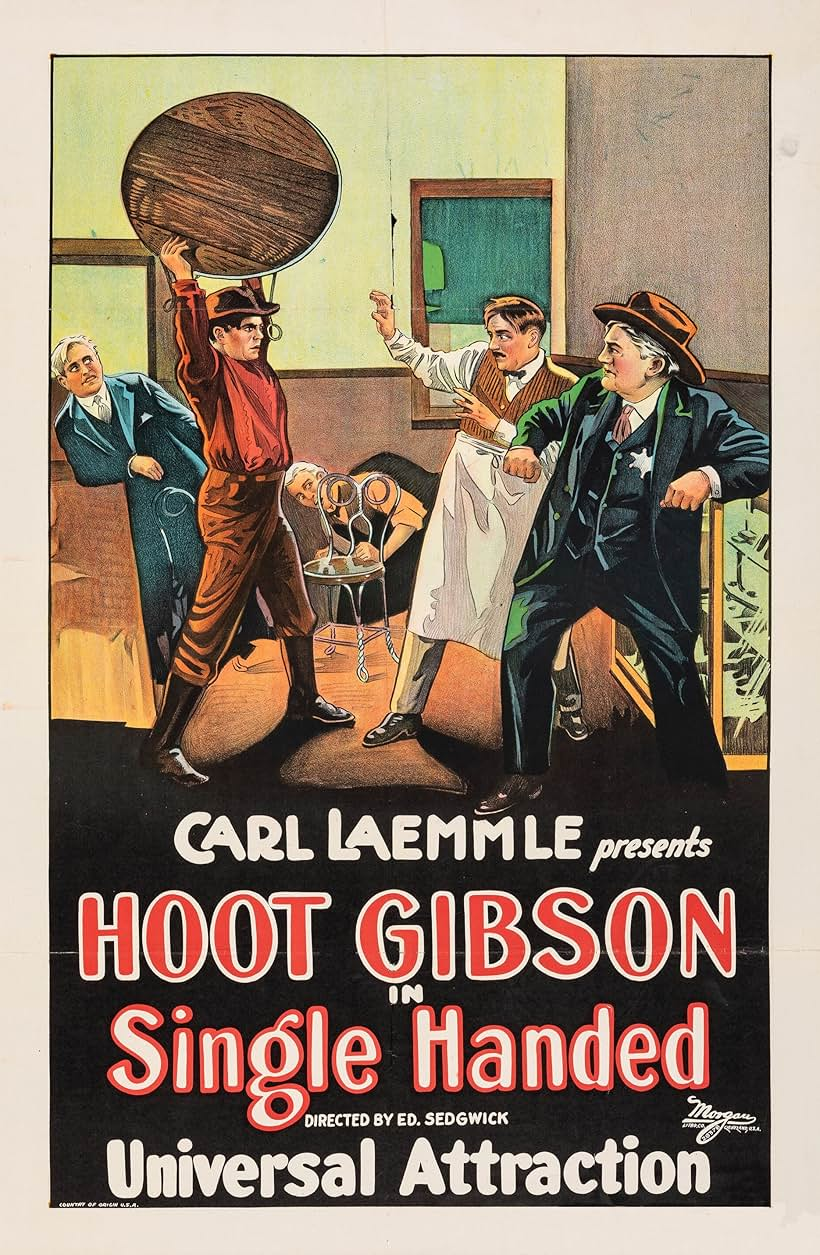
- Directed by: Edward Sedgwick
- Written by: George C. Hull; Edward Sedgwick
- Starring: Hoot Gibson
- Cinematography: Virgil Miller
- Release date: March 25, 1923
- Running time: 50 minutes
- Country: United States
- Languages: Silent; English intertitles

Single Handed is a 1923 American silent Western film directed by Edward Sedgwick and featuring Hoot Gibson.

== Cast ==
- Hoot Gibson as Hector MacKnight
- Elinor Field as Ruth Randolph
- Percy Challenger as Professor Weighoff
- William Steele as Windy Smith
- Philip Sleeman as Gypsy Joe
- Dick La Reno as Sheriff Simpel
- Mack V. Wright as Milo
- Tom McGuire as Macklin
- Gordon McGregor as The Boss
- W.T. McCulley as Ringmaster
- Charles Murphy as Foreman (credited as C.B. Murphy)
- Robert McKenzie as Manager (credited as Bob McKenzie)
- Sidney De Gray as Rancher (credited as Sidney De Grey)

== See also ==
- Hoot Gibson filmography
