= George Hernandez =

American silent film actor

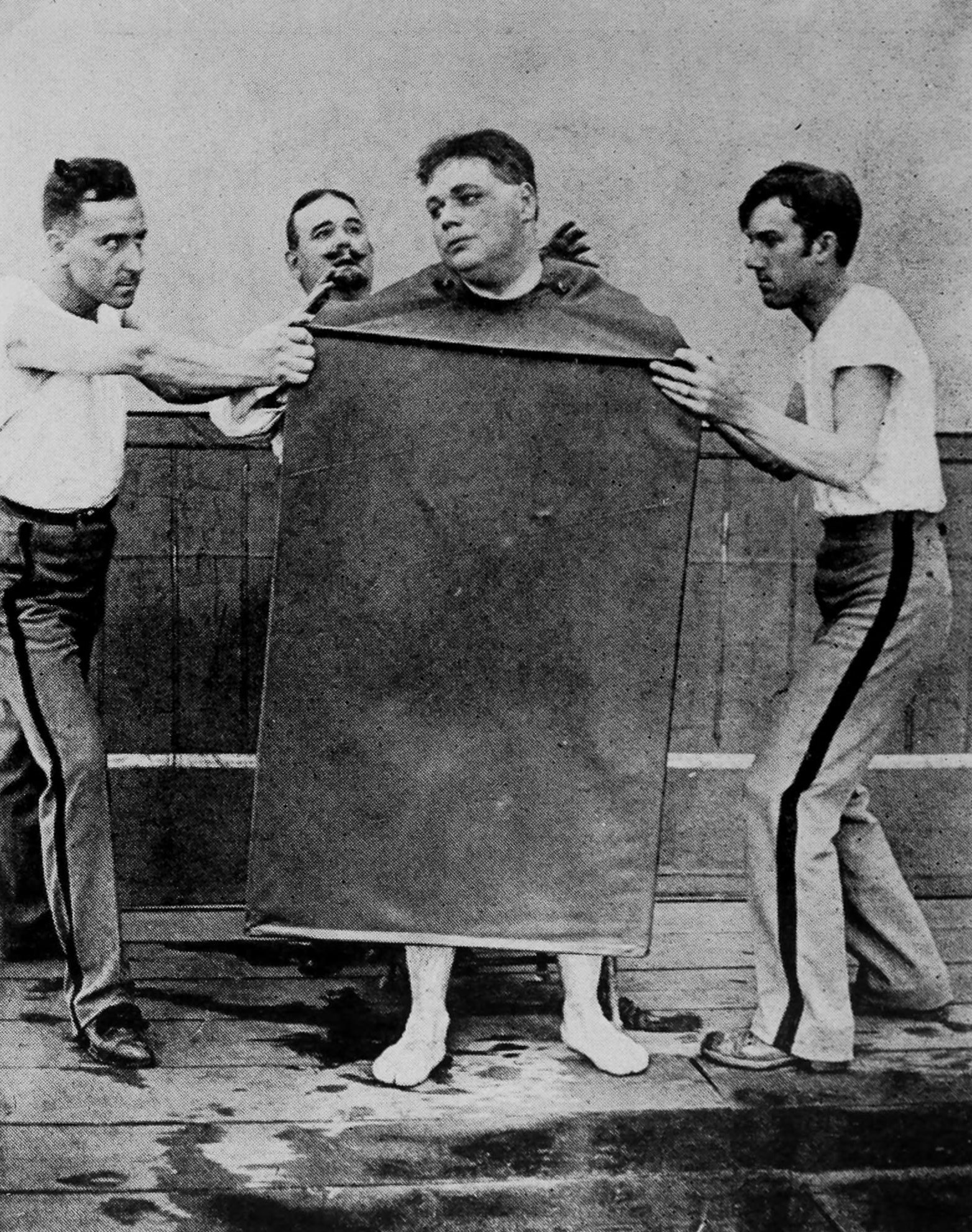
- Still from The Sanitarium (1910)
- Born: June 6, 1863; Placerville, California
- Died: December 31, 1922 (aged 59); Los Angeles, California
- Other name: George F. Hernandez
- Occupation: Actor
- Years active: 1910–1922
- Spouse: Anna Dodge

George F. Hernandez (1863–1922) was an American silent film actor who played character parts in 67 movies, following a career as a stage actor.

== Early life and education ==
Hernandez was born in Placerville, California, 15 years after the signing of the Treaty of Guadalupe Hidalgo. He was educated in Oakland.

== Career ==
In 1888, Hernandez made his acting debut on stage at the old California Theatre in San Francisco. In 1893, he joined the J.K. Emmet company which traveled throughout the United States and Canada. He later became part of the resident company at the Francois Theatre in Montreal, and also appeared at the Grand Opera House in New York.

From late 1897 through May 1899, Hernandez was a traveling Shakespearean actor with the Janet Waldorf Company, appearing in As You Like It and Romeo and Juliet.

Hernandez was a member of the William Nicholas Selig stock company, which pioneered filmmaking in Southern California. Later, he supported actress Myrtle Gonzalez in a series of popular outdoor adventures.

His first film, The Sanatarium, was made in 1910, preceding the existence of Hollywood studios.

== Personal life and death ==
Hernandez married actress Anna Dodge. He died in Los Angeles in 1922 due to complications after surgery.

== Filmography ==
- The Sanitarium (1910)
- The Little Widow (1911)
- The Maid at the Helm (1911)
- A Diamond in the Rough (1911)
- A Spanish Wooing (1911)
- The New Superintendent (1911)
- The Bootlegger (1911)
- Old Billy (1911)
- Captain Brand's Wife (1911)
- Out-Generaled (1911)
- The Rival Stage Lines (1911)
- The Heart of John Barlow (1911)
- Through Fire and Smoke (1911)
- The Regeneration of Apache Kid (1911)
- The Profligate (1911)
- The Craven Heart (1911)
- The White Medicine Man (1911) .... Professor A. Leclerque
- A Sacrifice to Civilization (1911)
- Told in the Sierras (1911)
- Where There's a Will, There's a Way (1911)
- Stability vs. Nobility (1911)
- Harbor Island (1912) .... Winters Banks
- Sammy Orpheus; or, The Pied Piper of the Jungle (1912)
- The Millionaire Vagabonds (1912) .... Pike A. Long
- The Vintage of Fate (1912)
- When Helen Was Elected (1912)
- Between the Rifle Sights (1912)
- Shanghaied (1912)
- Carmen of the Isles (1912)
- Her Educator (1912)
- Monte Cristo (1912) .... Napoleon
- Euchred (1912)
- How the Cause Was Won (1912)
- The Great Drought (1912)
- The Indelible Stain (1912)
- The Box Car Baby (1912)
- The Polo Substitute (1912)
- His Masterpiece (1912)
- The Old Stagecoach (1912)
- A Child of the Wilderness (1912)
- The Lost Hat (1912)
- Brains and Brawn (1912)
- A Humble Hero (1912)
- The New Woman and the Lion (1912)
- The End of the Romance (1912)
- Tenderfoot Bob's Regeneration (1912)
- A Waif of the Sea (1912)
- The Hobo (1912)
- The 'Epidemic' in Paradise Gulch (1912)
- A Crucial Test (1912)
- The Danites (1912)
- Disillusioned (1912)
- A Broken Spur (1912)
- The Little Stowaway (1912)
- A Night Out (1912)
- The Cowboy's Adopted Child (1912)
- The Probationer (1913) .... Scroggins, the Baker
- As a Father Spareth His Son (1913)
- Man and His Other Self (1913)
- The Trail of Cards (1913/II)
- The Beaded Buckskin Bag (1913)
- The Fighting Lieutenant (1913)
- Buck Richard's Bride (1913)
- In the Days of Witchcraft (1913)
- Margarita and the Mission Funds (1913) .... Gov. Luira Estrada
- The Spanish Parrot Girl (1913) .... Pedro Hernandez
- A Black Hand Elopement (1913)
- The Wasp (1914) .... John Ward
- The Making of Bobby Burnit (1914) .... David Applerod
- Willie (1914)
- The Squatters (1914) .... Mr. Ralston
- The Fire Jugglers (1914)
- The Midnight Call (1914) .... Lawler, Sr.
- While Wifey Is Away (1914) .... Mr. Jones
- Tested by Fire (1914) .... Old Man Carroll, Mountaineer
- Unto the Third and Fourth Generation (1914)
- Rosemary (1915) (as George F. Hernandez) .... Capt. Cruickshank
- The Landing of the Hose Reel (1915)
- The Circular Staircase (1915) .... Paul Armstrong
- The Rosary (1915) .... Barrister
- Retribution (1915)
- The Lady of the Cyclamen (1915)
- The Chronicles of Bloom Center (1915)
- The End of the Rainbow (1916) .... Elihu Bennett
- A Romance of Billy Goat Hill (1916) .... Colonel Bob Carsey
- His Mother's Boy (1916)
- From the Rogue's Gallery (1916)
- The Girl of Lost Lake (1916) .... Judge West
- The Secret of the Swamp (1916) .... Major Burke
- It Happened in Honolulu (1916) .... Mr. Wyland
- A Son of the Immortals (1916) .... Sergius Nesimir
- The Purple Maze (1916)
- Unto Those Who Sin (1916) .... Jules Villars
- The Making of Crooks (1916)
- Up or Down? (1917) .... Mike
- A Prairie Romeo (1917)
- Broadway Arizona (1917) .... Uncle Isaac Horn
- Mr. Opp (1917) .... Jimmy Fallows
- The Show Down (1917) .... John Benson
- The Greater Law (1917) .... Tully Winkle
- Southern Justice (1917) .... Judge Morgan
- The Smoldering Spark (1917)
- Mutiny (1917) .... Grandfather Whitaker
- God's Crucible (1917) .... Lorenzo Todd
- You Can't Believe Everything (1918) .... Henry Pettit
- The Man Who Woke Up (1918) .... Thomas Foster
- The Vortex (1918) .... Lew Herford
- The Hopper (1918) .... Wilbur Talbot
- Betty Takes a Hand (1918) .... James Bartlett
- Tin Pan Alley (1919) .... Simon Berg
- The Lost Princess (1919) .... Samuel Blevins, Sr.
- Be a Little Sport (1919) .... Dunley Faulkner
- Mary Regan (1919) .... Peter Loveman
- Miss Adventure (1919) .... Captain Barth
- The Silver Girl (1919) .... Chuck Wilson
- The Rebellious Bride (1919) .... Tobe Plunkett
- A Taste of Life (1919) .... Jonas Collamore
- The Courageous Coward (1919)
- Just Out of College (1920) .... Septimus Pickering
- The Village Sleuth (1920) (as George F. Hernandez) .... Mr. Richley
- Seeds of Vengeance (1920) .... George Hedrick
- The House of Toys (1920) .... Jonathan Radbourne
- The Honey Bee (1920) .... Ed Johnson
- The Third Woman (1920) .... James Riley
- The Daredevil (1920) .... Buchanan Atkinson
- The Money Changers (1920) .... James Hegan
- First Love (1921) .... Tad O'Donnell
- The Innocent Cheat (1921) .... Tim Reilly
- After Your Own Heart (1921) .... Luke Bramley
- The Lure of Egypt (1921) .... Mr. Botts
- The Road Demon (1921)
- Tom Mix in Arabia (1922) .... Arthur Edward Terhune
- Flaming Hearts (1922)
- Man Under Cover (1922) .... Daddy Moffat
- Bluebeard, Jr. (1922) .... The Lawyer
- Billy Jim (1922) .... Dudley Dunforth
