= God's Crucible =

God's Crucible may refer to:

- God's Crucible (1917 film), directed by Lynn Reynolds
- God's Crucible (1921 film), directed by Henry MacRae
