= Clyde Cook (cinematographer) =

American cinematographer

- Born: Clyde Raymond Cook; April 28, 1890; Pennsylvania, USA
- Died: July 22, 1936 (aged 56); Los Angeles, California, USA
- Occupation: Cinematographer
- Spouse: Isabelle Connelly

Clyde Cook was an American cinematographer active during Hollywood's silent era.

== Biography ==
Clyde was born in Pennsylvania to Daniel Cook and Minerva Kelts. The family later relocated to Bernalillo, New Mexico, where Clyde married his wife, Isabelle Connelly. Clyde began working as a cinematographer in the earliest days of Hollywood, and racked up experience lensing films for directors like Henry MacRae, Rex Ingram, and Raymond West.

== Selected filmography ==
- Bow Wow (1922)
- The Deceiver (1920)
- The Man Who Had Everything (1920)
- The Golden Trail (1920)
- A Double-Dyed Deceiver (1920)
- All Wrong (1919)
- Wife or Country (1918)
- Love's Pay Day (1918)
- Mystic Faces (1918)
- Humdrum Brown (1918)
- Up or Down? (1917)
- Broadway Arizona (1917)
- Mr. Opp (1917)
- The Show Down (1917)
- The Greater Law (1917)
- Southern Justice (1917)
- Mutiny (1917)
- God's Crucible (1917)
- The End of the Rainbow (1916)
- A Romance of Billy Goat Hill (1916)
- The Girl of Lost Lake (1916)
- Into the Primitive (1916)
