= Mr. Logan, U.S.A. =

1918 film

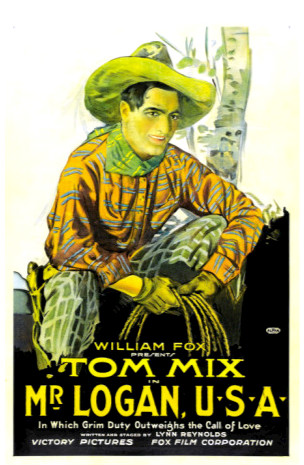
- Film poster
- Directed by: Lynn F. Reynolds
- Written by: Lynn Reynolds
- Based on: screen story by Jay Coffin
- Produced by: William Fox
- Starring: Tom Mix
- Cinematography: Devereaux Jennings (*as J.D. Jennings)
- Distributed by: Fox Film Corporation
- Release date: September 8, 1918
- Running time: 5 reels
- Country: United States
- Languages: Silent; English intertitles

Mr. Logan, U.S.A. is a lost 1918 silent film western directed by Lynn F. Reynolds and starring Tom Mix. It was produced and distributed by Fox Film Corporation.

Also known as Jim Logan, U. S. A..

== Cast ==
- Tom Mix - Jim Logan
- Kathleen O'Connor - Suzanne Morton
- Dick La Reno - Uncle Billy Morton
- Charles Le Moyne - Jim Crosby
- Jack Dill - Olsen
- Val Paul - J. Alexander Gage, aka Meier
- Maude Emory - Dolly Dugan
- Jack Curtis - Actor (unbilled)
