= The Breath of the Gods =

1920 film by Rollin S. Sturgeon

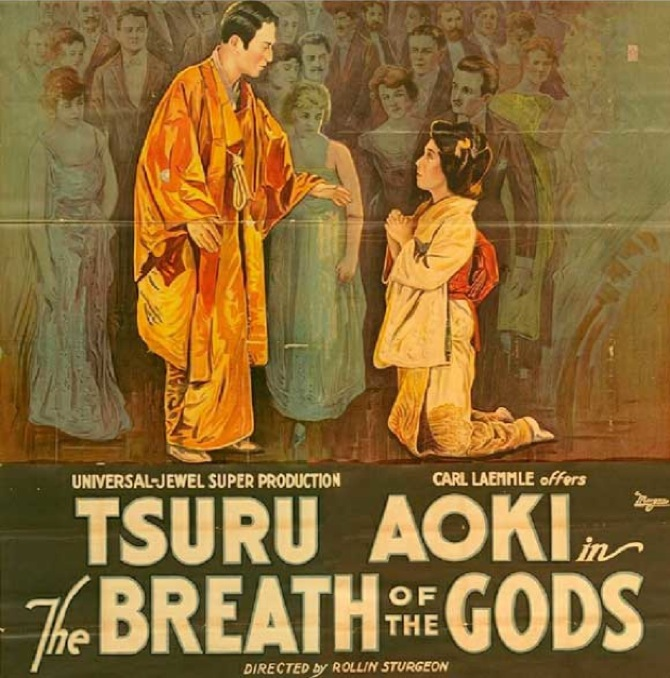
- Theatrical release poster
- Directed by: Rollin S. Sturgeon
- Written by: Charles J. Wilson (scenario)
- Based on: The Breath of the Gods by Sidney McCall
- Produced by: Corley Z. Ito
- Starring: Tsuru Aoki; Stanhope Wheatcroft; Arthur Carewe; Pat O'Malley
- Cinematography: Alfred Gosden
- Production company: Universal Film Manufacturing Company
- Distributed by: Universal Jewel Super-Production
- Release date: July 25, 1920
- Running time: 60 minutes
- Country: United States
- Language: Silent (English intertitles)

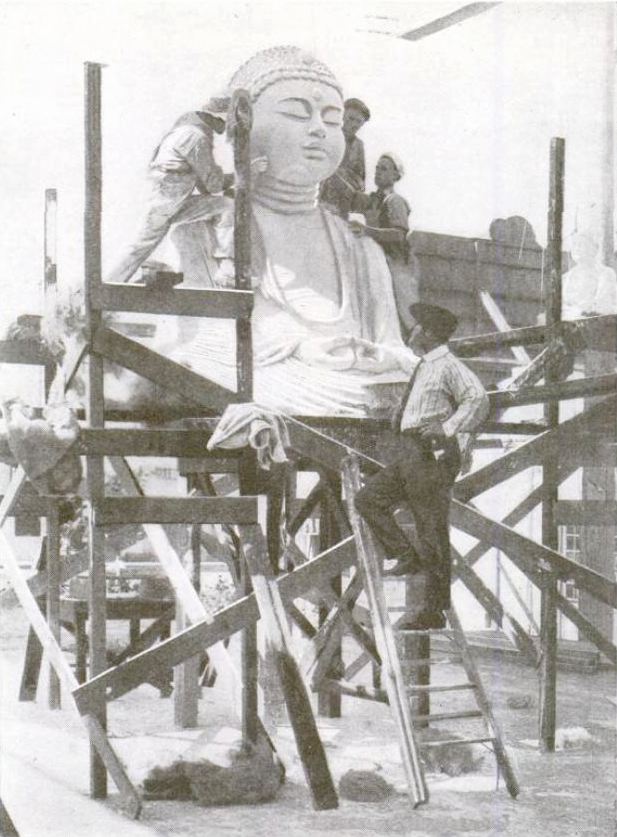
Crew members constructing a Buddha for the set of the movie.

The Breath of the Gods is a 1920 American silent romantic drama film directed by Rollin S. Sturgeon and starring Tsuru Aoki. Set during the Russo-Japanese War, the film is based on the 1905 novel of the same name by Sidney McCall.

== Plot ==
As described in a film magazine, the Russo-Japanese War of 1904-1905 threatens the peace of Japan, so Yuki Onda is directed home from her American school by her father. With her sails a party of American diplomatic friends that includes Pierre Le Beau, to whom Yuki has pledged her love. Her father's faith in her inherited honor obliges her to marry Prince Hagane, and in the opportunity to be of service to her country comes an opposing loyalty to him and love for Le Beau. Le Beau is an attache of the embassy of Australia in Japan, and he is made an unwilling instrument in an attempt to secure valuable information from her. Yuki, believing that she has failed in her trust, takes her own life, leaving a sorrowing Prince and the penitent and loving Le Beau.

== Cast ==
- Tsuru Aoki as Yuki Onda
- Stanhope Wheatcroft as Pierre Le Beau
- Arthur Carewe as Prince Hagane
- Pat O'Malley as T. Caraway Dodge
- J. Barney Sherry as Senator Todd
- Marian Skinner as Mrs. Todd
- Ethel Shannon as Gwendolyn
- Misao Seki as Yuki's Father
- Mai Wells as Yuki's Mother
- Paul Weigel as Count Ronsard

== Preservation ==
With no prints of The Breath of the Gods located in any film archives, it is considered a lost film.
