= Mr. Opp =

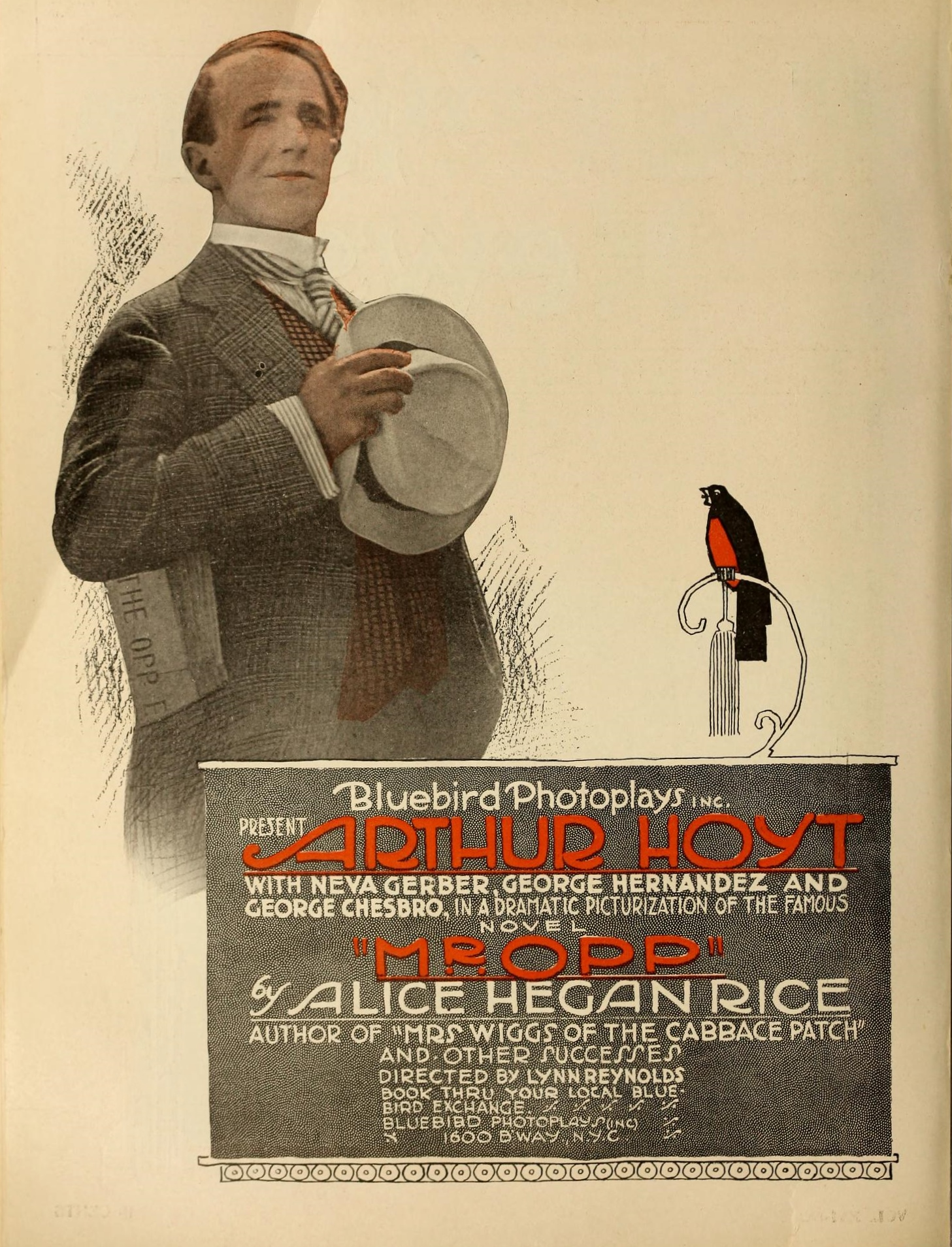
- Directed by: Lynn Reynolds
- Written by: Alice Hegan Rice (novel); Lynn Reynolds
- Starring: Arthur Hoyt; George Chesebro; George Hernandez
- Cinematography: Clyde Cook
- Production company: Universal Pictures
- Distributed by: Universal Pictures
- Release date: August 20, 1917
- Running time: 50 minutes
- Country: United States
- Languages: Silent; English intertitles

Mr. Opp is a 1917 American silent drama film directed by Lynn Reynolds and starring Arthur Hoyt, George Chesebro and George Hernandez.

== Cast ==
- Arthur Hoyt as Mr. D. Webster Opp
- George Chesebro as Willard Hinton
- George Hernandez as Jimmy Fallows
- Jack Curtis as John Mathews
- Neva Gerber as Guinevere Gusty
- Elsie Maison as Miss Kippy
- Anne Lockhart as Mrs. Gusty
- Jane Bernoudy as Jemima Fenny

== Bibliography ==
- Goble, Alan. The Complete Index to Literary Sources in Film. Walter de Gruyter, 1999.
