= Daughters of Today (1924 film) =

1924 film

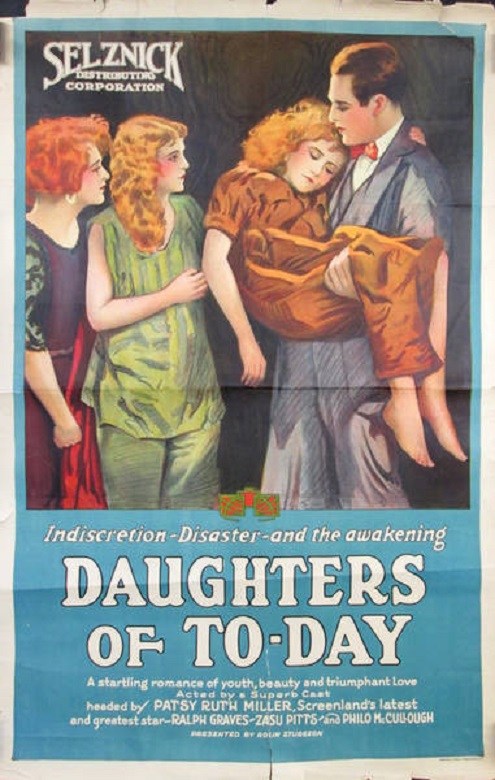
- Theatrical poster
- Directed by: Rollin S. Sturgeon
- Written by: Lucien Hubbard
- Starring: Patsy Ruth Miller; Ralph Graves; Edna Murphy
- Cinematography: Milton Moore
- Production company: Sturgeon-Hubbard Company
- Distributed by: Selznick Distributing Corporation
- Release date: February 2, 1924
- Running time: 81 minutes
- Country: United States
- Language: Silent (English intertitles)

Daughters of Today is a 1924 American silent drama film directed by Rollin S. Sturgeon and starring Patsy Ruth Miller, Ralph Graves, and Edna Murphy.

== Plot ==
As described in a film magazine review, Lois Whittall's father Leigh is interested in a young blonde charmer. Lois and her college friends are out for a good time and en route pick up Mabel Vandegrift, a young country woman who was very strictly reared by her parents. Their gay roadside party is wound up by a moonlight bathing frolic. The young people are then scattered by outraged villagers and they are in an automobile accident. Lois and Mabel then become mixed up in a murder mystery. In the end, it all comes out alright and the two young women find happiness with their respective lovers.

== Cast ==
- Patsy Ruth Miller as Lois Whittall
- Ralph Graves as Ralph Adams
- Edna Murphy as Mabel Vandegrift
- Edward Hearn as Peter Farnham
- Philo McCullough as Reggy Adams
- George Nichols as Dirk Vandegrift
- Gertrude Claire as Ma Vandegrift
- Phillips Smalley as Leigh Whittall
- ZaSu Pitts as Lorena
- Henry Hebert as Calnan (credited as H.J. Herbert)
- Fontaine La Rue as Mrs. Mantell
- Truman Van Dyke as Dick
- Dorothy Wood as Flo
- Marjorie Bonner as Maisie

== Production ==
Daughters of Today was originally developed by Irving Thalberg as a flapper film, but was assigned to be directed by Sturgeon when Thalberg left for MGM.

== Censorship ==
Films during that period were subject to censorship by state and city censor boards. The Board of Motion Picture Review of Worcester, Massachusetts, banned the showing of Daughters of Today.

== Bibliography ==
- Stumpf, Charles. ZaSu Pitts: The Life and Career. McFarland, 2010. ISBN 978-0-7864-4620-9
