= Captain Alvarez =

1920 silent film

- Directed by: Rollin S. Sturgeon
- Production company: Vitagraph Company of America
- Release date: 1914

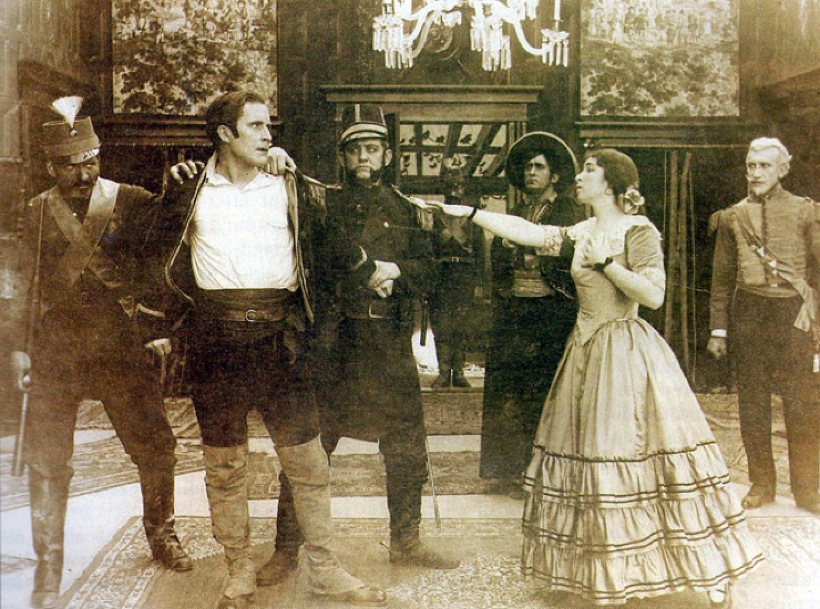
A scene from Captain Alvarez

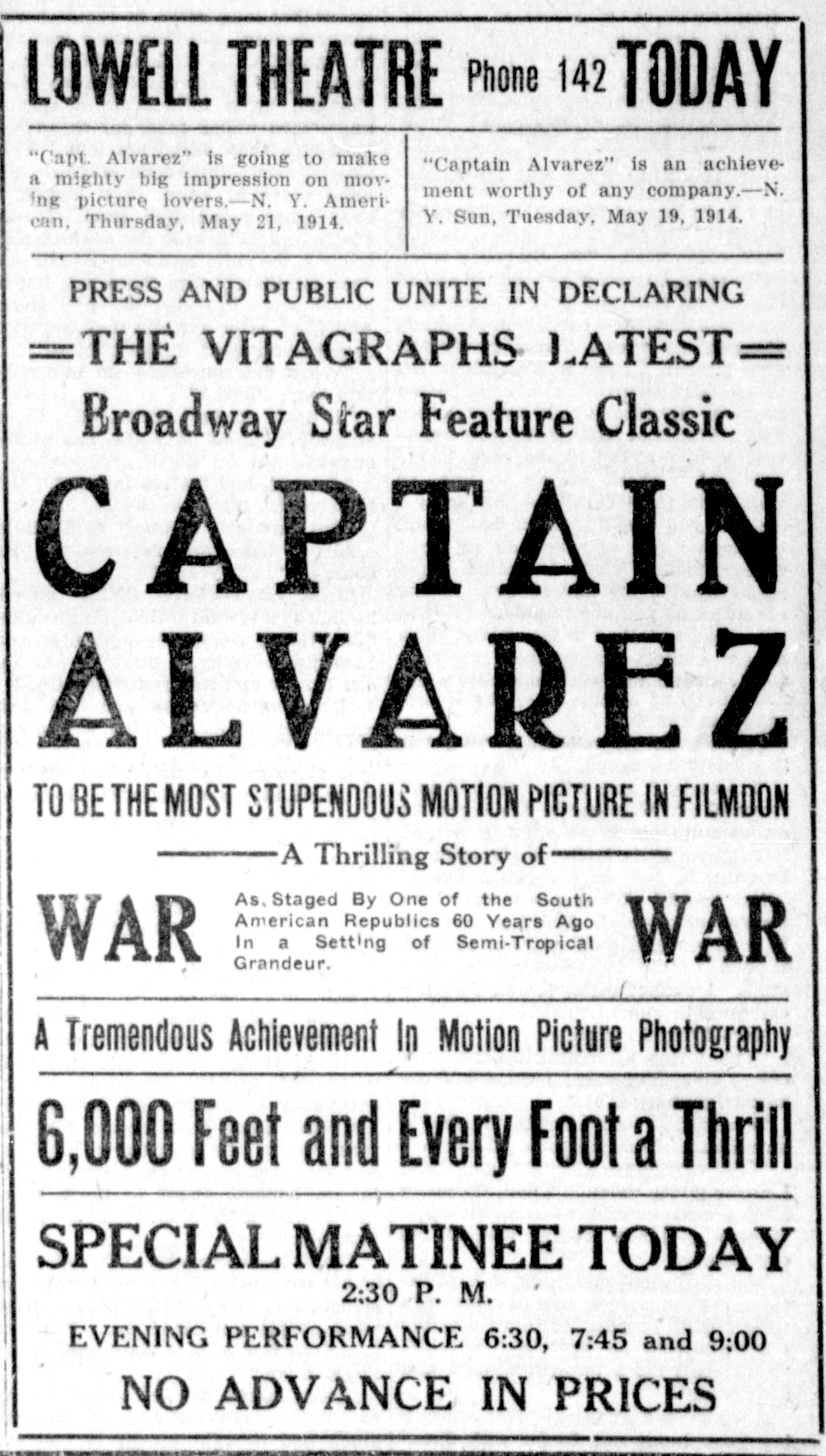
A newspaper ad for the film.

Captain Alvarez is a 1914 Vitagraph's five-reel film, based on a stage play by Paul Gilmore. Written by Marguerite Bertsch, and directed by Rollin S. Sturgeon.

== Plot ==
A melodrama about an American who becomes a revolutionary leader battling evil government spies in Argentina. William Desmond Taylor portrays the title role, and Denis Gage Deane-Tanner, Taylor's younger brother, is thought to have played the small role of a blacksmith.

== Cast ==
- Edith Storey
- William Desmond Taylor
- George Stanley
- George Holt
- Otto Lederer
- Myrtle Gonzalez
- George Kunkel

== Reception ==
Louis Reeves Harrison, writing for The Moving Picture World, gave a overview of the story and complemented the acting and the casting, noting that "Director Sturgeon has done well with his company and his setting".
