= Rollin S. Sturgeon =

American film director

Rollin Summers Sturgeon
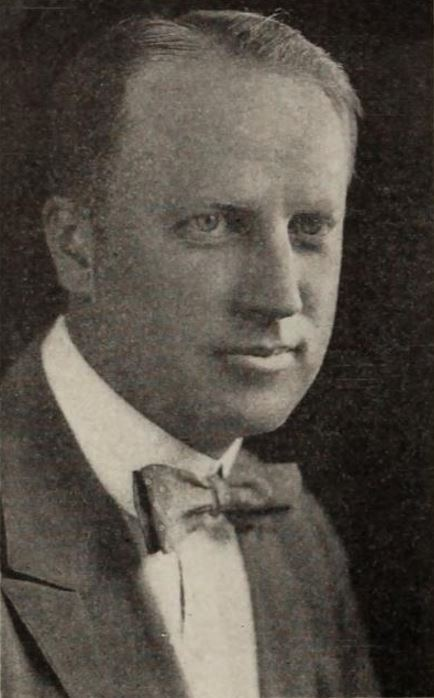
- From a 1920 magazine
- Born: August 25, 1877; Rock Island, (Illinois)
- Died: May 10, 1961 (aged 83); Santa Monica,(California)
- Occupations: film director and screenwriter

Rollin Summers Sturgeon (August 25, 1877 – May 10, 1961) was an American film director of silent films active from 1910 to 1924. He directed 101 films during this period.

== Filmography ==
Video of the romantic adventure silent film Betty and the buccaneers (1917, Rollin S. Sturgeon, 1:05:10 running time). Collection EYE Film Institute Netherlands.

Video of the romantic comedy silent film All dolled up (1921, Rollin S. Sturgeon, 37:38 running time). Collection EYE Film Institute Netherlands.

=== Director ===
- Uncle Tom's Cabin, Part 1 1910
- A Little Lad in Dixie (1911)*short
- The Trapper's Daughter (1911)*short
- A Western Heroine (1911)*short
- Her Cowboy Lover*short
- The Half-Breed's Daughter (1911)*short
- The Black Chasm (1911)*short
- The Heart of a Man (1912)*short
- Justice of the Desert (1912)*short
- How States Are Made (1912) *short
- The Price of Big Bob's Silence (1912)*short
- The Craven (1912)*short
- Sheriff Jim's Last Shot (1912)*short
- The Greater Love (1912)*short
- The Redemption of Ben Farland (1912)*short
- The Triumph of Right (1912)*short
- The Prayers of Manuelo (1912)*short
- Her Brother (1912)*short
- At the End of the Trail (1912)*short
- After Many Years (1912)*short
- The Redemption of Red Rube (1912)*short
- Too Much Wooing of Handsome Dan (1912)*short
- The Ancient Bow (1912)*short
- A Wasted Sacrifice (1912)*short
- The Road to Yesterday; or, Memories of Patio Days (1912)*short
- The Troubled Trail (1912)*short
- Bill Wilson's Gal (1912)*short
- When California Was Young (1912)*short
- The Spirit of the Range (1912) *short
- Out of the Shadows (1912)*short
- Timid May (1912)*short
- Omens of the Mesa (1912)*short
- Natoosa (1912)*short
- The Hat (1912)
- The Better Man (1912)*short
- A Bit of Blue Ribbon (1913) *short
- The Angel of the Desert (1913) *short
- The Winning Hand (1913 *short
- The Joke on Howling Wolf (1913)*short
- The Smoke from Lone Bill's Cabin (1913)*short
- The Whispered Word (1913) *short
- Polly at the Ranch (1913)*short
- A Corner in Crooks (1913) *short
- When the Desert Was Kind *short
- The Deceivers (1913)*short
- According to Advice (1913)*short
- A Matter of Matrimony (1913) *short
- The Two Brothers (1913)
- Bedelia Becomes a Lady (1913)*short
- After the Honeymoon (1913)*short
- The Power That Rules (1913)*short
- Cinders (1913)*short
- The Sea Maiden (1913)*short
- The Wrong Pair (1913)*short
- What God Hath Joined Together (1913)*short
- The Spell (1913)*short
- The Courage of the Commonplace (1913) *short
- The Ballyhoo's Story (1913)*short
- At the Sign of the Lost Angel (1913) *short
- Big Bob Waits (1913) *short
- Their Interest in Common (1914) *short
- Silent Trails (1914) *short
- Tony, the Greaser (1914) *short
- The Sea Gull (1914)*short
- Captain Alvarez(1914)
- The Little Angel of Canyon Creek (1914)
- The Sage-Brush Gal (1914)*short
- The Chalice of Courage(1915)
- A Child of the North (1915)*short
- The Lorelei Madonna (1915)*short
- The Woman's Share (1915)*short
- Love and Law (1915)
- Bitter Sweet (1916)*short
- Bill Peter's Kid (1916)*short
- God's Country and the Woman (1916)
- Through the Wall (1916)
- The Mystery of Lake Lethe (1917)*short
- The American Consul (1917)
- Whose Wife? (1917)
- Edged Tools (1917)
- The Upper Crust (1917)
- The Rainbow Girl (1917)
- The Calendar Girl (1917)
- Betty and the Buccaneers (1917, see video)
- A Petticoat Pilot (1918)
- The Shuttle (1918)
- Unclaimed Goods (1918)
- Hugon, The Mighty(1918)
- Destiny (1919)
- Pretty Smooth (1919)
- The Sundown Trail (1919)
- The Girl in the Rain (1920)
- The Breath of the Gods (1920)
- In Folly's Trail (1920)
- The Gilded Dream (1920)
- Risky Business, co-regia Harry B. Harris (1920)
- Danger Ahead (1920)
- The Mad Marriage (1921)
- All Dolled Up (1921)
- North of the Rio Grande (1922)
- West of the Water Tower (1923)
- Daughters of Today (1924)

=== Writer ===
- 1910 Uncle Tom's Cabin
- 1912 Bill Wilson's Gal
- 1913 The Transition
- 1913 The Ballyhoo's Story
- 1914 Tony, the Greaser
- 1914 Only a Sister
