= After Your Own Heart =

1921 film directed by George Marshall

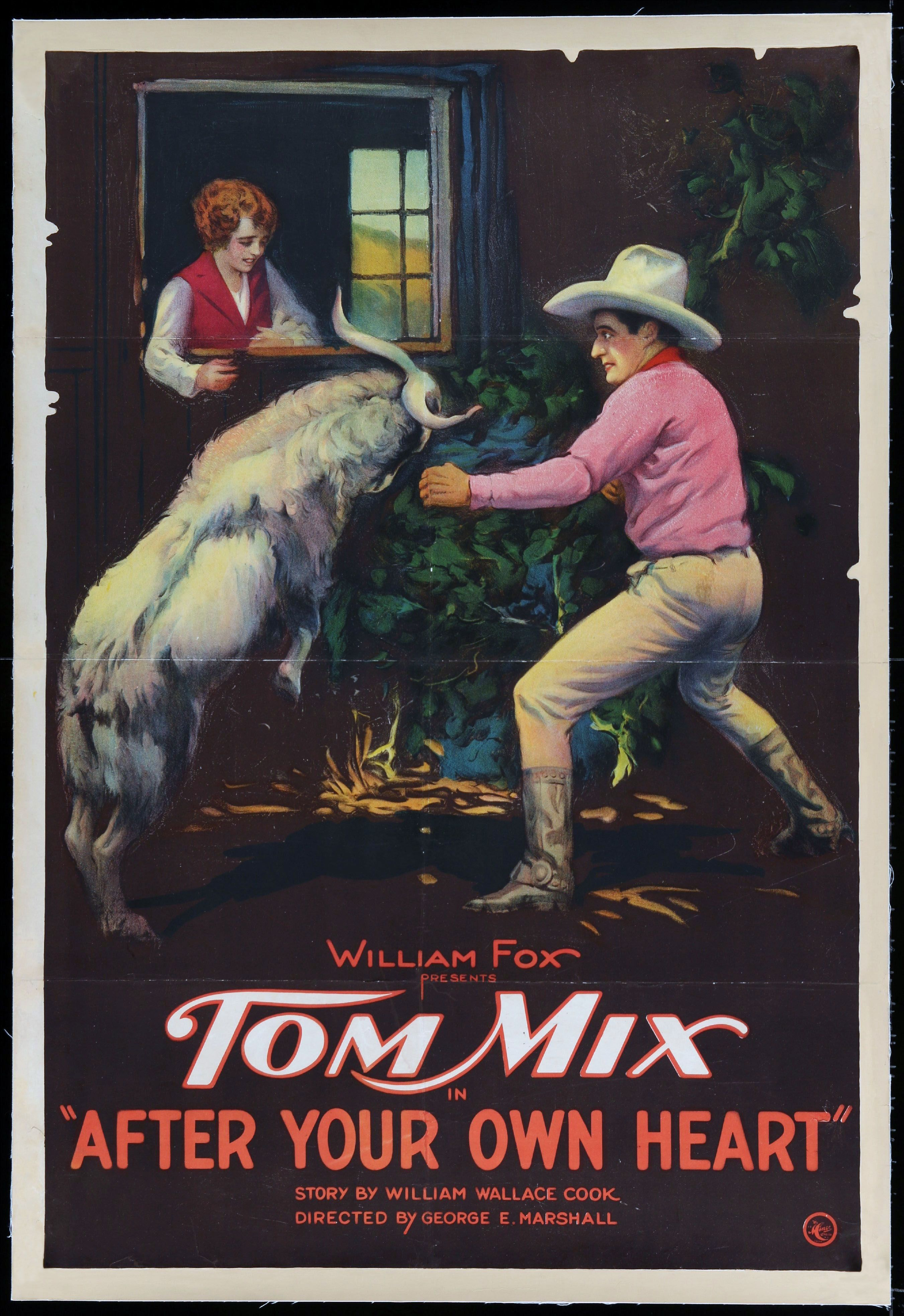
- Directed by: George Marshall
- Written by: William Wallace Cook; Tom Mix; John Montague; Ralph Spence
- Produced by: William Fox
- Starring: Tom Mix; Ora Carew; George Hernandez
- Cinematography: Benjamin H. Kline
- Edited by: Ralph Spence
- Production company: Fox Film Corporation
- Distributed by: Fox Film Corporation
- Release date: August 7, 1921
- Running time: 50 minutes
- Country: United States
- Languages: Silent; English intertitles

After Your Own Heart is a lost 1921 American silent Western film directed by George Marshall and starring Tom Mix, Ora Carew and George Hernandez.

== Cast ==
- Tom Mix as Herbert Parker
- Ora Carew as Loretta Bramley
- George Hernandez as Luke Bramley
- William Buckley as Peter Ruddock
- Sid Jordan as Tex Marole

== Preservation ==
With no holdings located in archives, After Your Own Heart is considered a lost film.

== Bibliography ==
- Connelly, Robert B. The Silents: Silent Feature Films, 1910-36, Volume 40, Issue 2. December Press, 1998.
- Munden, Kenneth White. The American Film Institute Catalog of Motion Pictures Produced in the United States, Part 1. University of California Press, 1997.
