= For Big Stakes =

1922 film

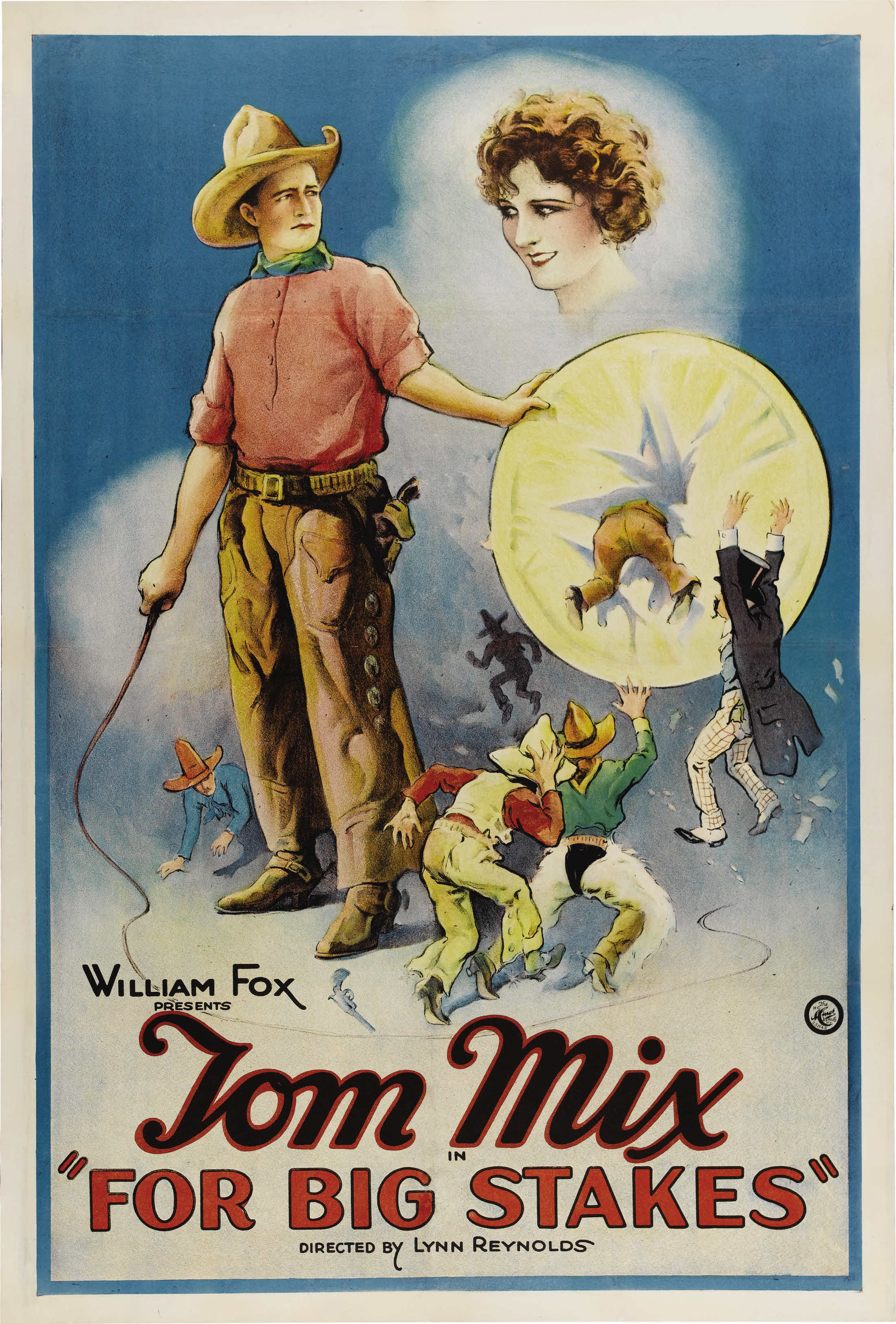
- Lobby poster
- Directed by: Lynn Reynolds
- Written by: Lynn Reynolds; Ralph Spence (titles)
- Produced by: William Fox
- Starring: Tom Mix
- Cinematography: Daniel B. Clark
- Edited by: Ralph Spence
- Distributed by: Fox Film Corporation
- Release date: June 18, 1922
- Running time: 5 reels
- Country: United States
- Languages: Silent; English intertitles

For Big Stakes is a 1922 American silent Western film directed by Lynn Reynolds and starring Tom Mix. It was produced by and distributed by Fox Film Corporation.

== Cast ==
- Tom Mix as "Clean-up" Sudden
- Patsy Ruth Miller as Dorothy Clark
- Sid Jordan as Scott Mason
- Bert Sprotte as Rowell Clark
- Joe Harris as Ramon Valdez
- Al Fremont as Sheriff Blaisdell
- Earl Simpson as Tin Hon Johnnie
- Tony as himself, a Horse

== Preservation status ==
A complete copy of For Big Stakes is preserved at Narodni Filmovy Archiv, in Prague.
