= George Kunkel (actor, born 1866) =

American character actor and opera singer

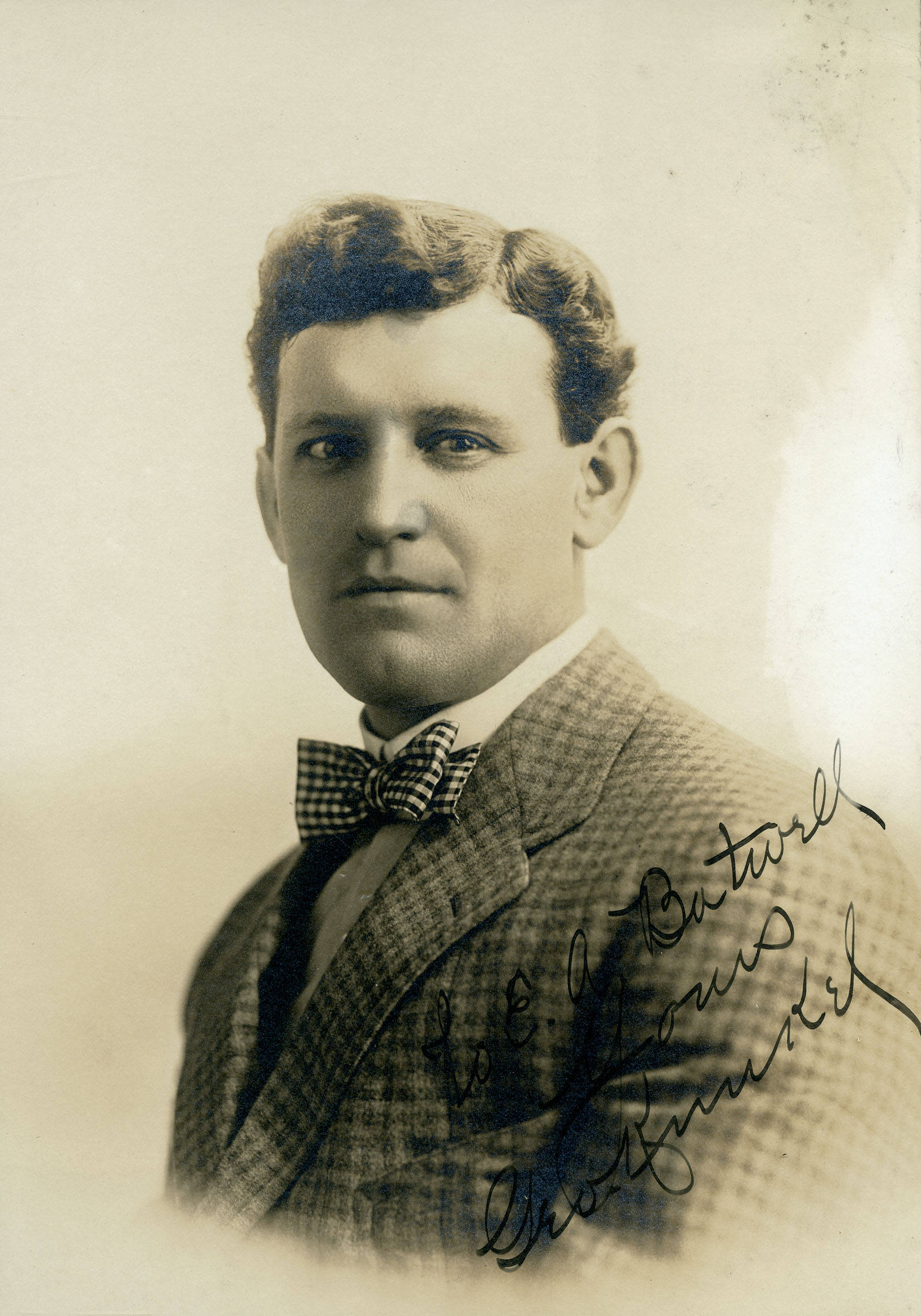
George Kunkel

George Kunkel (December 29, 1866 – November 8, 1937) was an American character actor and operatic baritone.

Kunkel began his stage career performing alongside his mother, the actress Ada Proctor, in 1887. By 1896 he began appearing with professional light opera companies as a comedian and baritone; touring throughout North America and to Hawaii over the next six years. From 1901 to 1905 he was active as both an opera singer and an actor in dramatic and comedic plays in Australia and New Zealand. He was a member of the San Francisco Opera Company from 1905 to 1908, and briefly returned to the company in 1909. He was a member of the Aborn Opera Company in 1908 and 1911. From 1911 to 1912 he starred in numerous plays at the Orpheum Theatre in Cincinnati.

== Early life, family, and stage debut ==
George Kunkel Jr. was born in Baltimore, Maryland, on December 29, 1866. He was the son of theatre manager, actor, and singer George Kunkel and his wife Addie Kunkel. His mother was an actress who was known on the stage as Ada Proctor. His sister was the soprano Mamie Kunkel, known on the concert and oratorio stage after her marriage to the composer and choral conductor Edward M. Zimmerman as both Marie Kunkel Zimmerman and Marie Zimmerman.

Kunkel's mother was born in Montreal, Canada, and her first marriage was to John Proctor, theatre manager of the Chestnut Street Theatre in Philadelphia. She married George Kunkel after her first husband's death. She had a son from her first marriage, the actor John Proctor, who was George Kunkel Jr.'s half brother. She died at her son John's home in Philadelphia in 1892.

Kunkel's father was a well known blackface minstrel show performer and theatre manager of the 19th century who became famous for his portrayal of Uncle Tom in a stage adaptation of the novel Uncle Tom's Cabin on stages in the United States and England. His father died in 1885. George Kunkel Jr.'s career as an actor began with a revival of this play that was staged by theatrical producer and actor J. Newton Gotthold in 1887 at the Harris Theater in Cincinnati. Like his father, he was known on the stage as George Kunkel. Kunkel portrayed the role of Phineas with the actress Sallie Partington as Topsy and his mother, then billed as Mrs. Kunkel, as Ophelia. He reprised that role at the same theater in 1888.

== Career ==
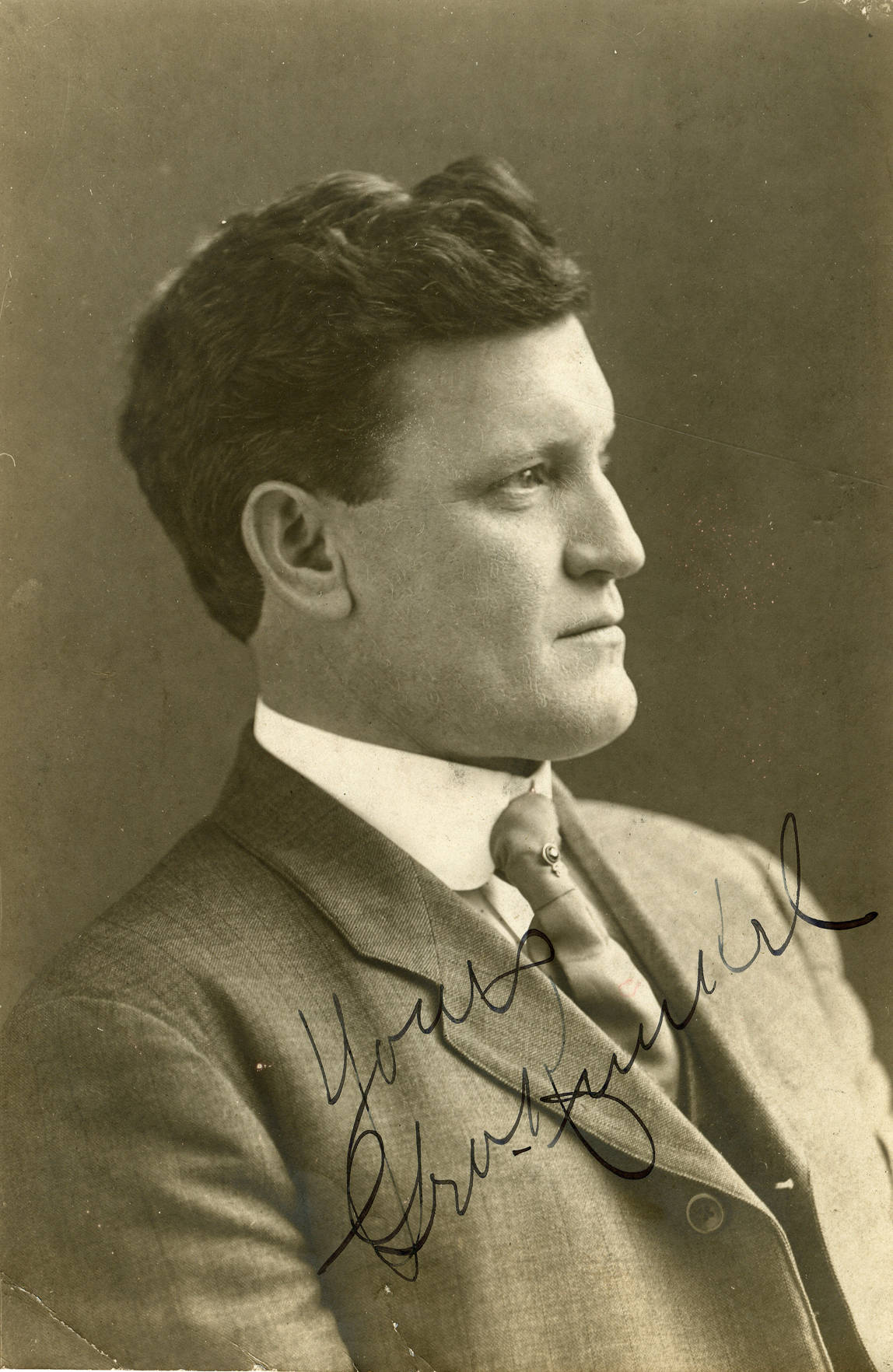
George Kunkel in 1907

=== Early career ===
By 1896 Kunkel had joined Charles L. Young's touring Columbian Comic Opera Company for performances in the United States and Canada. His repertoire with the company that year included the roles of Beppo in Fra Diavolo and Hackenback, magistrate of Trautenfeld, in Carl Millöcker's The Black Hussar. He continued to portray leading comic roles with the company on tour in 1897 to cities like Los Angeles, San Francisco, Winnipeg, Denver, Dallas, and Olympia, Washington; starring in performances of Scott Marble and Richard Stahl's Said Pasha and Edmond Audran's La mascotte. He portrayed Rocco in the latter opera the following year with the Merrie Bell Opera Company.

In early 1899 Kunkel became the leading male actor in Rose Stillman's company which was then performing in Albuquerque, New Mexico. With that troupe he starred in several comedic plays, among them Charles Reade's Nance Oldfield, and a stage adaptation of Frances Hodgson Burnett's Edith's Burgler. He then became a member of the Boston Lyric Opera Company (BLOC), making his debut with the company in June 1899 in Still Pasha. He portrayed the part of Hadad in that opera on tour with BLOC to the Hawaiian Opera House in Honolulu later that year. When the company staged a production of La belle Hélène in 1899 it interpolated a new song written by Kunkel, "The Ice Man", into the production.

In 1900 Kunkel toured with the BLOC for performances in Los Angeles. His repertoire with that company included the title role in J. Cheever Goodwin's Wang which he first performed on tour to the Metropolitan Opera House in Saint Paul, Minnesota. Other roles with the BLOC included Captain De Merimac in Les noces d'Olivette; Lotteringhi, the cooper, in Boccaccio, Méphistophélès in Faust, Gaspard in The Chimes of Normandy, and the title role in Gilbert and Sullivan's The Mikado.

=== Australia and New Zealand ===
In 1901 Kunkel became the leading male comic opera star of the Josephine Stanton Opera Company; an organization with whom he toured Australia, and New Zealand. He had a particular triumph at the Criterion Theatre in Sydney as Goodwin's Wang. In 1902 he was engaged at the Theatre Royal, Adelaide as Doc Smikfins in J. C. Williamson's musical A Runaway Girl. In 1903 he became the stage manager as well as an actor with Lyceum Stock Company in Honolulu with whom he starred in both comedic and dramatic plays. His repertoire with that company included the title role in the farce The Private Secretary and Bean in William Gillette's drama Held by the Enemy.

Kunkel left Hawaii in December 1903 to return to New Zealand where he joined the theatre company Sanford's American Players (SAP). With that company he portrayed the blackface role of Nimrod in Scott Marble's The Sidewalks of New York, Simon Legree in Uncle Tom's Cabin, and was the villain Mark Sarley in Bland Holt's melodrama The Power of Gold. He portrayed another blackface role with the company in George Hoey's melodrama The Pace that Kills at the Royal Lyceum, Sydney in October 1904. He was still working in Australia as late as June 1905 performing the role of the villain McClosky in Dion Boucicault's The Octoroon at the Bijou Theatre, Melbourne. He returned to Hawaii from Australia in July 1905.

=== San Francisco ===
For the 1905-1906 season Kunkel was engaged as a member of the San Francisco Opera Company (SFOC; no relation to the current San Francisco Opera which was not yet established) at the Tivoli Opera House in San Francisco where he was starred in productions of Reginald De Koven's operetta The Highwayman Jacques Offenbach's Orpheus in the Underworld, and Paul Schindler and Ben Jerome and Paul Schindler's The Isle of Spice. When the 1906 San Francisco earthquake occurred on April 18, 1906, the Tivoli Opera House was one of several buildings destroyed in related fires. Kunkel was one of many people displaced during the event, and was officially listed as missing in a report published in the San Francisco Call on May 10, 1906. An August 12, 1906, newspaper report in the Oakland Tribune states that he spent eight weeks performing with the SFOC on tour to the Grand Opera House in Seattle in the summer of 1906.

After the destruction of the Tivoli Opera House, the SFOC built the American Theater on Market Street as a new venue for the company. Kunkel was one of the performers participating in the grand opening of the theater on January 21, 1907. He continued to perform with the SFOC in the succeeding years. Other works he performed with the SFOC included Ludwig Engländer's The Strollers (1907 and 1909), Harry Lawson Heartz and Richard Carle's The Tenderfoot (1907, as Professor Pettibone), De Koven's Robin Hood (1907, as Friar Tuck), Julian Edwards and Stanislaus Stange's Dolly Varden (1907, as Jack Fairfax) Victor Herbert's The Singing Girl (1907), Herbert's The Idol's Eye (1907, as Jaamie McSnuffy) Bryceson Treharne's The Toymaker (1907, as Johannus Guggenheimer, aka "The Toymaker"), Raymond Hubbell's Fantana (1907 and 1908), Henry Grattan Donnelly and Fred Miller's Ships Ahoy! (1908, as Mapleson Mulberry) and Herbert's Babette (1908, as Van Tympel).

=== Later stage career, film career, and death ===
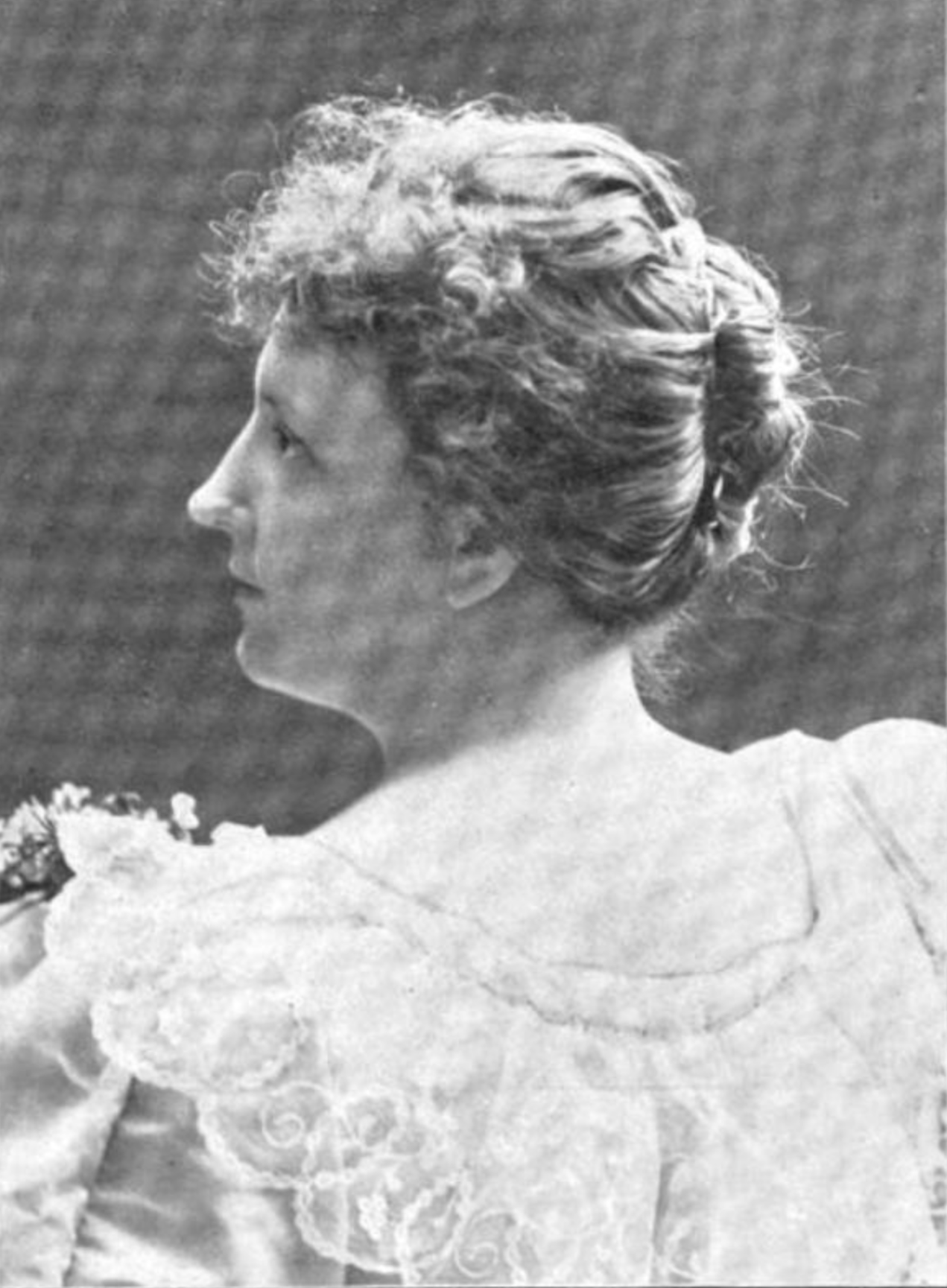
George's sister, the soprano Marie Kunkel Zimmerman

By March 1908 Kunkel had left California and joined the touring Aborn Opera Company. Roles he performed with that company on a national tour during that year included Cheops and King Ptolemy in The Wizard of the Nile, Friar Tuck in Robin Hood, Sir Joseph Porter in H.M.S. Pinafore, Ravennes in Erminie, and the title role in Wang. He returned to the Aborn Opera Company in 1911, beginning with a production of The Red Mill at Palisades Amusement Park in the summer of that year. In December 1911 he joined the group of resident actors at the Orpheum Theatre in Cincinnati, making his debut with the company as Sergeant Keller in Augustus Thomas's drama Arizona. Some of his other roles with that company included Matt Donovan in George Broadhurst and George V. Hobart's Wildfire (1911), Sir Charles in Oliver Goldsmith's She Stoops to Conquer (1911), Judge Harlan in Langdon McCormick's Out of the Fold (1912), Sam Robinson in James Montgomery's The Aviator (1912), and the blackface part of the barber George Washington White in William Collier Sr.'s Caught in the Rain (1912).

Kunkel married Frances A Heintz on August 23, 1913. He transitioned away from the stage and into film beginning that year. He started his film career appearing in one to three reel short films from 1913 to 1916. He then starred as a character actor in fourteen feature-length films from 1914 to 1921; most of which were Westerns. He portrayed the mountaineer Robert Maitland in Vitagraph Studios's The Chalice of Courage (1915); notably the first film in the history of cinema to depict an assisted suicide.

In 1927 Kunkel returned to the stage, portraying the Sheriff of Nottingham in De Koven's Robin Hood at the Hollywood Bowl. In 1928 he starred in a production of Jerome Kern's musical Sally at the Shrine Auditorium in Los Angeles.

George Kunkel died at the age of 70 in Los Angeles. He is buried in Hollywood Forever Cemetery. Kunkel was survived by his wife Frances, his sister Marie Kunkel Zimmerman, and his son, Herbert Kunkel. Herbert's death certificate lists George Kunkel as his father and Grace Davis as his mother, and that he was born in Pennsylvania on December 2, 1890, and died on March 1, 1943, in Philadelphia. With the exception of his place of birth, this information is identical in Herbert Gresham Kunkel's U.S., World War I Draft Registration Card. It states he was born in Buffalo, New York on December 2, 1890.

== Selected filmography ==
- Bianca (1913)
- Captain Alvarez (1914)
- The Chalice of Courage (1915), adapted from the novel of the same name by Cyrus Townsend Brady
- Ghosts and Flypaper (1915), a short Vitagraph comedy
- Three Johns (1916),
- God's Country and the Woman (1916), adapted from James Oliver Curwood's 1915 novel
- The Fighting Trail (1917)
- The Magnificent Meddler (1917)
- Unclaimed Goods (1918)
- The Dawn of Understanding (1918)
- The Changing Woman (1918)
- Leave It to Susan (1918)
- A Fighting Colleen (1919)
- Pinto (film) (1920)
- The Girl in the Rain (1920)
- An Unwilling Hero (1921)
- Where Men Are Men (1921)
