= The Secret of the Swamp =

1916 drama film by Lynn Reynolds

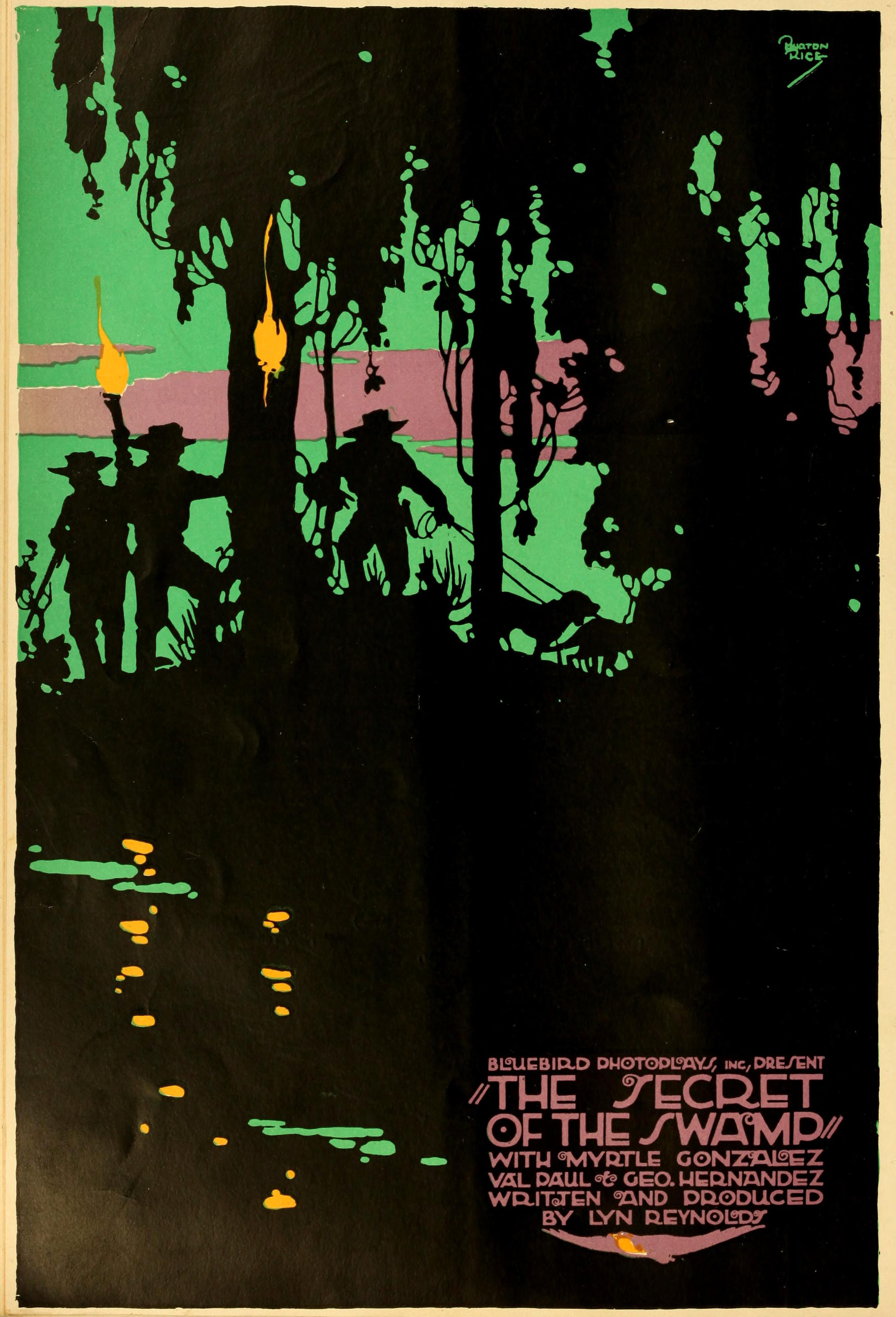
- Theatrical release poster
- Directed by: Lynn Reynolds
- Screenplay by: Lynn Reynolds
- Starring: George Hernandez; Myrtle Gonzalez; Fred Church; Frank MacQuarrie; Val Paul; Countess Du Cello
- Cinematography: Harry A. Gant
- Production company: Bluebird Photoplays, Inc.
- Distributed by: Bluebird Photoplays, Inc.
- Release date: July 31, 1916
- Running time: 50 minutes
- Country: United States
- Language: English

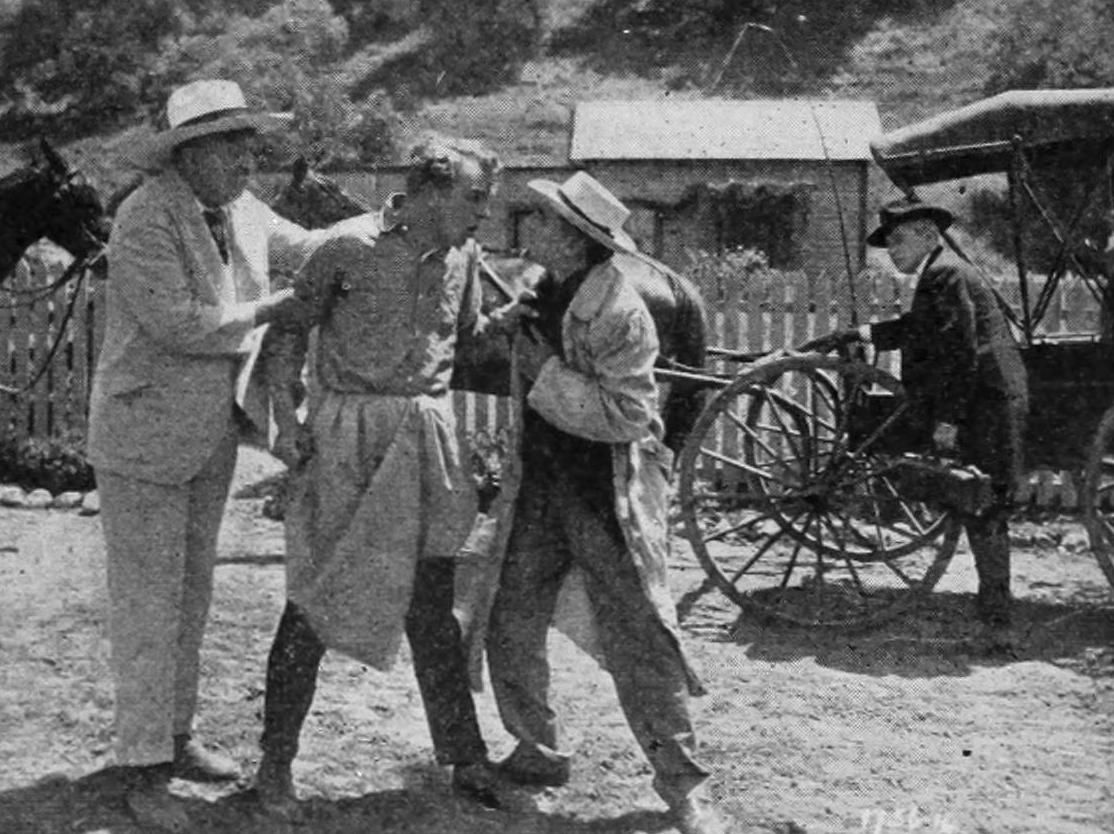
Scene from the film

The Secret of the Swamp is a 1916 American drama film written and directed by Lynn Reynolds. The film stars George Hernandez, Myrtle Gonzalez, Fred Church, Frank MacQuarrie, Val Paul and Countess Du Cello. The film was released on July 31, 1916, by Bluebird Photoplays, Inc.

== Plot ==
Chet Wells, a poor farmer who rents land from Deacon Todd, falls in love with neighbor Emily Burke, who often comes to his farmhouse to look after Chet's invalid mother. However, Emily's father wants her to marry Allan Waite, a local man of means. Chet's hopeless situation becomes even moreso when his mother dies and the deacon turns him out of his house, so he abandons his love for Emily and leaves for the timberlands with hopes of making his fortune. Meanwhile, the deacon and Emily's father, Major Burke, become involved in a land dispute, and one night, as the deacon takes down a fence in order to let his cattle graze on his neighbor's land, the major fires buckshot in his direction. The next day, Deacon Todd has disappeared, and Major Burke, seeing vultures circling over a nearby swamp, fears he has killed him. When he discovers some scattered bones picked clean by animals, he keeps quiet about what he believes is murder, although Emily soon learns of his guilt when she hears him muttering in his drunken slumber. When Chet hears about the incident, he returns to take the blame in order to spare the Burkes any embarrassment, and this gesture makes Emily forget all about her sweetheart and fall in love with Chet instead. Then, just before Chet can be convicted, the deacon appears in a Model T Ford and reveals that after the buckshot narrowly missed him, he left town for a few days to purchase an automobile. It is soon discovered that the deacon's remains are really those of a cow that got stuck in the swamp.

== Cast ==
- George Hernandez as Major Burke
- Myrtle Gonzalez as Emily Burke
- Fred Church as Allan Waite
- Frank MacQuarrie as Deacon Todd
- Val Paul as Chet Wells
- Countess Du Cello as His Mother
- Lule Warrenton as Deacon's Housekeeper
- Jack Curtis as The Sheriff
