= Southern Justice (film) =

1917 film

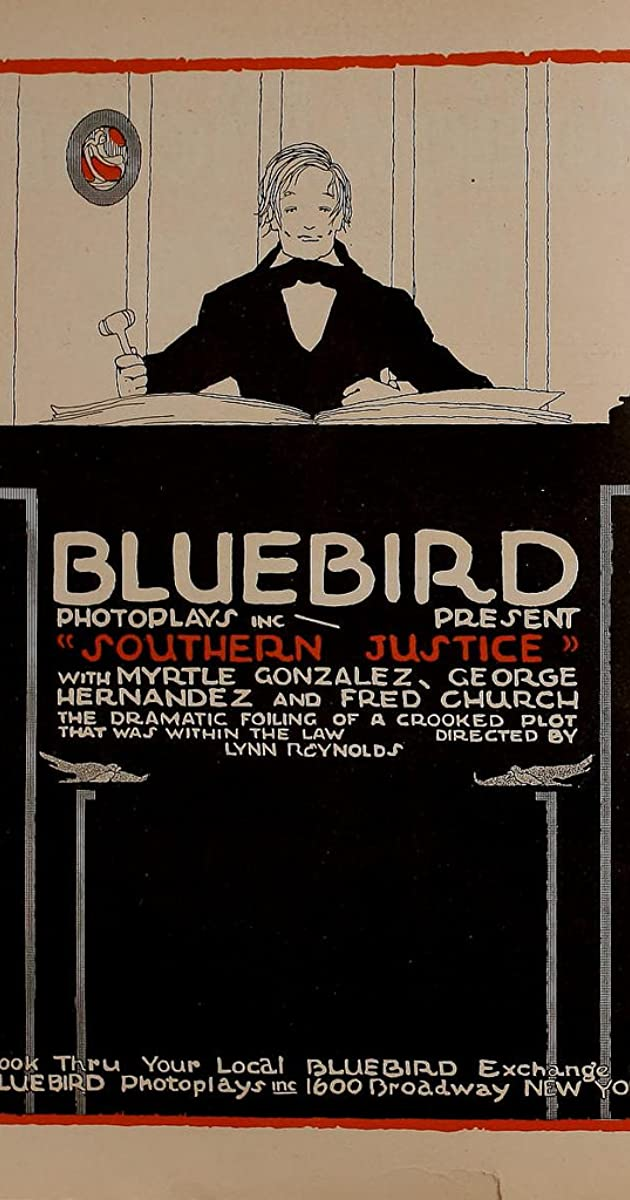
- Directed by: Lynn Reynolds
- Written by: Lynn Reynolds
- Produced by: Lynn Reynolds
- Starring: Myrtle Gonzalez; George Hernandez; Jean Hersholt
- Cinematography: Clyde Cook
- Production company: Universal Pictures
- Distributed by: Universal Pictures
- Release date: May 28, 1917
- Running time: 50 minutes
- Country: United States
- Languages: Silent; English intertitles

Southern Justice is a 1917 silent drama film directed by Lynn Reynolds and starring Myrtle Gonzalez, George Hernandez and Jean Hersholt.

== Cast ==
- Myrtle Gonzalez as Carolyn Dillon
- George Hernandez as Judge Morgan
- Jack Curtis as Roger Appleby
- Jean Hersholt as Caleb Talbot
- Charles Hill Mailes as Major Dillon
- Fred Church as Ray Preston
- Elwood Bredell as Daws Anthony
- Maxfield Stanley as Wallace Turner
- George Marsh as Uncle Zeke

== Bibliography ==
- Robert B. Connelly. The Silents: Silent Feature Films, 1910-36, Volume 40, Issue 2. December Press, 1998.
