= Broadway Arizona =

1917 film

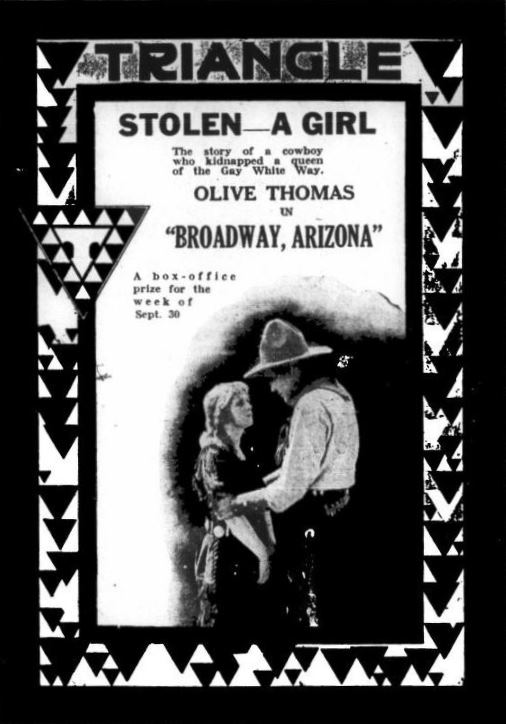
- Directed by: Lynn Reynolds
- Written by: Lynn Reynolds
- Starring: Olive Thomas; George Chesebro; George Hernandez
- Cinematography: Clyde Cook
- Production company: Triangle Film Corporation
- Distributed by: Triangle Distributing
- Release date: September 30, 1917
- Running time: 50 minutes
- Country: United States
- Languages: Silent; English intertitles

Broadway Arizona is a 1917 American silent Western film directed by Lynn Reynolds and starring Olive Thomas, George Chesebro and George Hernandez. Prints of this film exist in the National Film and Sound Archive.

== Cast ==
- Olive Thomas as Fritzi Carlyle
- George Chesebro as John Keys
- George Hernandez as Uncle Isaac Horn
- Jack Curtis as Jack Boggs
- Dana Ong as Press Agent
- Tom Guise as Old Producer
- Neola May as Indian Squaw
- Robert Dunbar as Doctor
