= Elwood Bredell =

American cinematographer and actor (1902–1969)

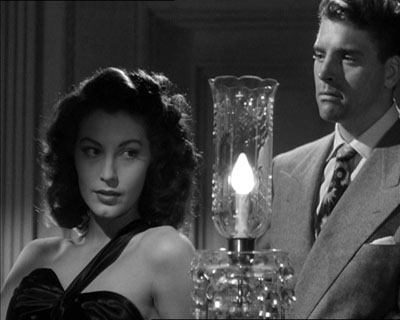
- Ava Gardner and Burt Lancaster in The Killers in 1946
- Born: Jesse B. Bredell; 24 December 1902; Indianapolis, Indiana
- Died: 26 February 1969; California
- Other names: Woody Bredell; Elwood Dell
- Occupations: Cinematographer, actor
- Years active: 1917–1955

Elwood Bailey Bredell (24 December 1902 – 26 February 1969) was an American cinematographer and child silent screen actor. He is sometimes credited as Woody Bredell or Elwood Dell. Although he worked in many genres, mostly at Universal, Bredell is best known for his film noir cinematography on such movies as Phantom Lady (1944), Lady on a Train (1945) The Killers (1946), and The Unsuspected (1947). Warner Bros. editor George Amy said Bredell could "light a football stadium with a single match".

== Early life ==
Bredell was born Jesse B. Bredell Jr., named after his father, who was married to stage actress Mary Palmer Nields. She later married Vaughn "Val" Paul, a silent film actor turned production manager. (Paul's son with Nields, Vaughn Jr., was Deanna Durbin's first husband.)

== Career ==
After working as an adolescent actor in silent films, Bredell took a job as a studio lab technician while he cultivated a talent for photography. From about 1929 to 1934, Bredell worked as a still photographer at RKO and Paramount, coinciding with his stepfather's tenures at those studios. At Paramount, Bredell apprenticed under veteran cinematographers Charles Lang and Arthur C. Miller. In 1936, Paul brought Bredell to Universal, where he continued his training under the studio's best cinematographer, Joseph Valentine. Bredell was promoted to cinematographer the next year, when Paul produced Reckless Living (1938).

Bredell's work on horror films such as Black Friday (1940), The Mummy's Hand (1940), and Ghost of Frankenstein (1942), anticipated his film noir cinematography. He also photographed Deann Durbin musicals and comedies such as Hold That Ghost (1941), Hellzapoppin' (1941) and The Inspector General (1949). His final credit was on the 1955 B-movie Female Jungle.

== Selected filmography ==
=== Actor ===
- Southern Justice (1917)
- A Young Patriot (1917)
- Your Boy and Mine (1917)
- Up or Down? (1917)
- The Magic Eye (1918)

=== Cinematographer ===
- Snowbound (1927)
- That's My Story! (1937)
- Little Tough Guy (1938)
- Two Bright Boys (1939)
- Ex-Champ (1939)
- Black Friday(1940)
- The Mummy's Hand (1940)
- The Invisible Woman (1940)
- Hold That Ghost (1941)
- Man Made Monster (1941)
- South of Tahiti (1941)
- Hellzapoppin' (1941)
- The Ghost of Frankenstein (1942)
- The Amazing Mrs. Holliday (1943)
- His Butler's Sister (1943)
- Phantom Lady (1944)
- Christmas Holiday (1944)
- Lady on a Train (1945)
- Smooth as Silk (1946)
- The Killers (1946)
- The Unsuspected (1947)
- Romance on the High Seas (1948)
- The Adventures of Don Juan 1948
- The Inspector General (1949)
- Journey into Light (1951)
- Christmas Hymns (1954)
- Female Jungle (1955)
