= The Girl in the Rain =

1920 film by Rollin S. Sturgeon

- Directed by: Rollin S. Sturgeon
- Written by: Frederic Van Rensselaer Dey (novel); Doris Schroeder
- Starring: Anne Cornwall; Lloyd Bacon; Jessalyn Van Trump
- Cinematography: Alfred Gosden
- Production company: Universal Pictures
- Distributed by: Universal Pictures
- Release date: July 17, 1920
- Running time: 50 minutes
- Country: United States
- Languages: Silent; English intertitles

The Girl in the Rain is a 1920 American silent mystery film directed by Rollin S. Sturgeon and starring Anne Cornwall, Lloyd Bacon and Jessalyn Van Trump.

== Cast ==
- Anne Cornwall as Judith
- Lloyd Bacon as Walter
- Jessalyn Van Trump as Vera
- Jim Farley as Max Williams
- George Kunkel as Jim West
- James Liddy as Boone
- Neil Hardin as Bill Cortwright

== Bibliography ==
- Ken Wlaschin. Silent Mystery and Detective Movies: A Comprehensive Filmography. McFarland, 2009.
