= Tom Mix in Arabia =

1922 film

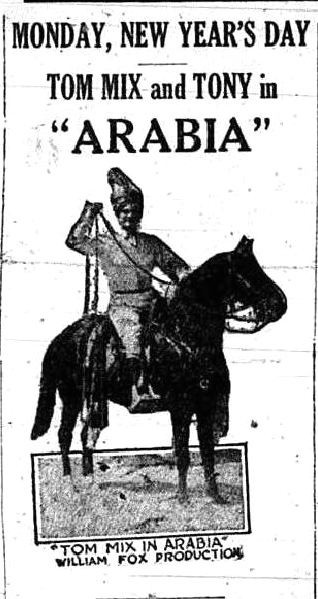
- Directed by: Lynn Reynolds
- Written by: Hettie Gray Baker; Tom Mix; Lynn Reynolds
- Produced by: William Fox
- Starring: Tom Mix; Barbara Bedford; George Hernandez
- Cinematography: Daniel B. Clark
- Edited by: Hettie Gray Baker
- Production company: Fox Film Corporation
- Distributed by: Fox Film Corporation
- Release date: November 5, 1922
- Country: United States
- Languages: Silent; English intertitles

Tom Mix in Arabia is a 1922 American silent adventure film directed by Lynn Reynolds and starring Tom Mix, Barbara Bedford and George Hernandez.

== Cast ==
- Tom Mix as Billy Evans
- Barbara Bedford as Janice Terhune
- George Hernandez as Arthur Edward Terhune
- Norman Selby as Pussy Foot Bogs
- Edward Peil Sr. as Ibrahim Bulamar
- Ralph Yearsley as Waldemar Terhune
- Hector V. Sarno as Ali Hasson

== Preservation ==
With no prints of Tom Mix in Arabia located in any film archives, it is considered a lost film. In October 2019, the film was cited by the National Film Preservation Board on their Lost U.S. Silent Feature Films.

== Bibliography ==
- Solomon, Aubrey. The Fox Film Corporation, 1915-1935: A History and Filmography. McFarland, 2011.
