= Mutiny (1917 film) =

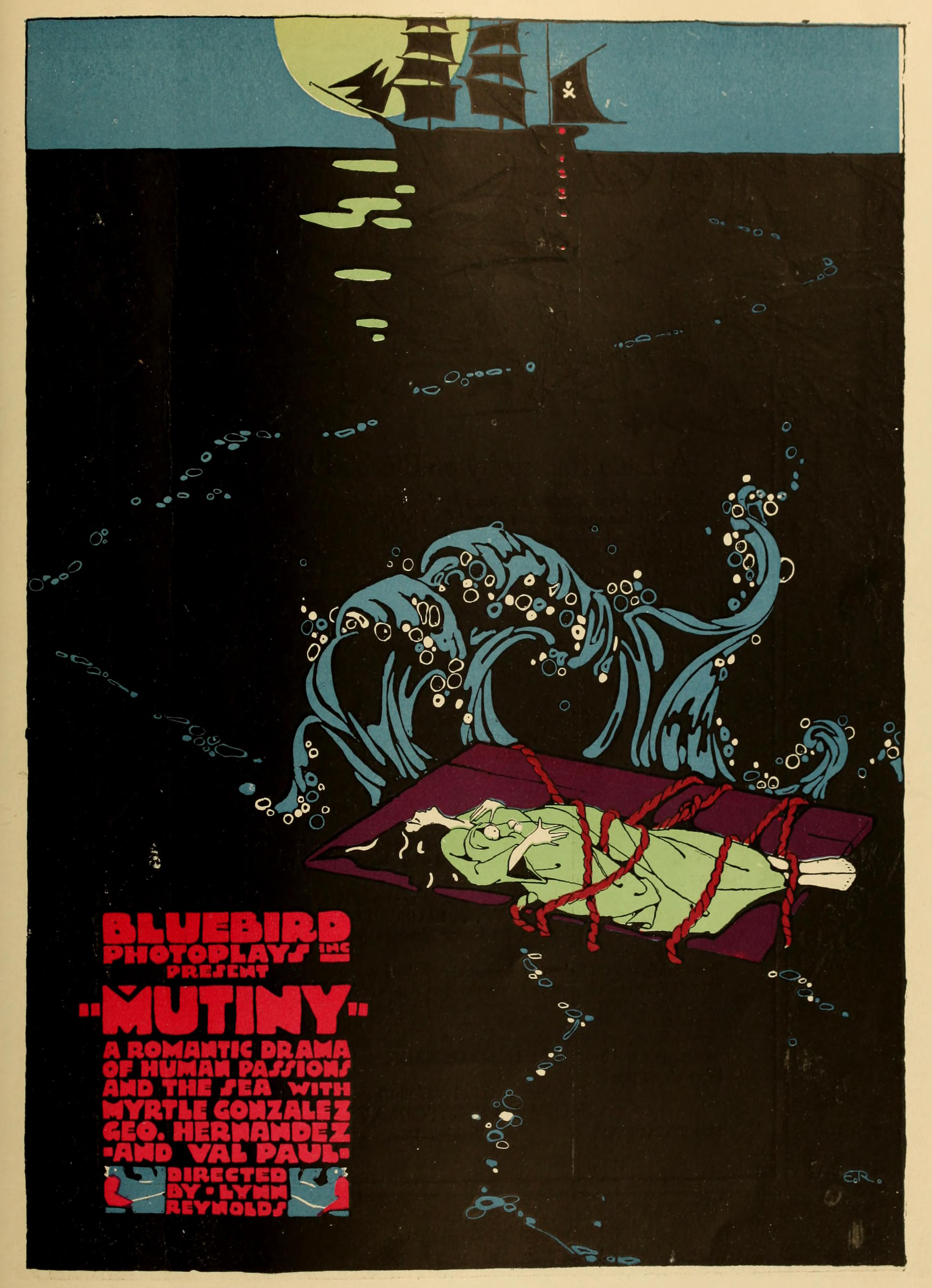
- Directed by: Lynn Reynolds
- Written by: Lynn Reynolds
- Starring: Myrtle Gonzalez; Jack Curtis; George Hernandez
- Cinematography: Clyde Cook
- Production company: Universal Pictures
- Distributed by: Universal Pictures
- Release date: March 12, 1917
- Running time: 50 minutes
- Country: United States
- Languages: Silent; English intertitles

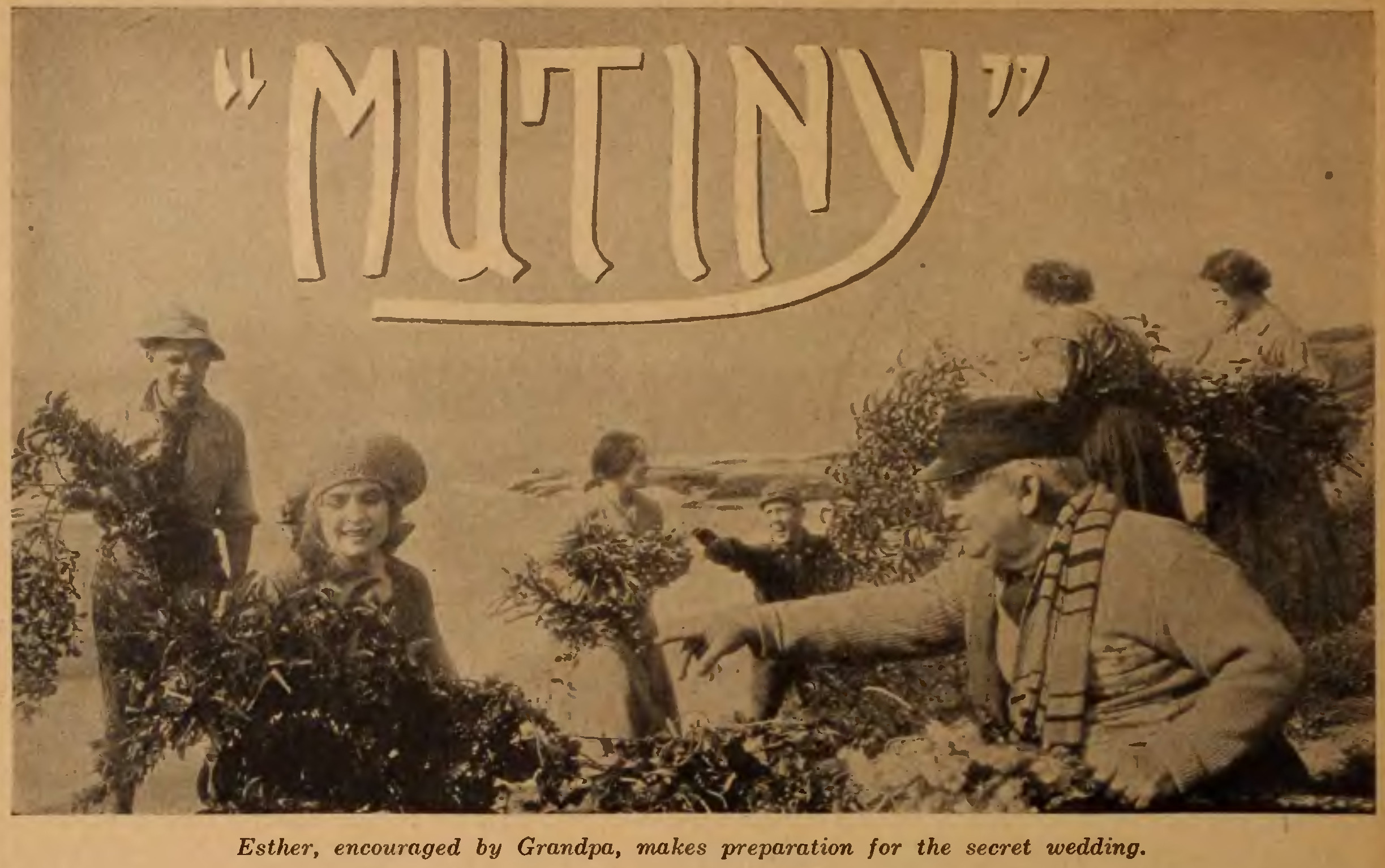
Mutiny 1917 ad in Moving Picture Weekly

Mutiny is a 1917 American silent drama film directed by Lynn Reynolds and starring Myrtle Gonzalez, Jack Curtis and George Hernandez.

== Cast ==
- Myrtle Gonzalez as Esther Whitaker
- Jack Curtis as Aaron Whitaker
- George Hernandez as Grandfather Whitaker
- Fred Harrington as Caleb Whitaker
- Val Paul as Jacob Babcock
- Ed Brady as Eben Wiggs

== Bibliography ==
- Robert B. Connelly. The Silents: Silent Feature Films, 1910-36, Volume 40, Issue 2. December Press, 1998.
