= The Sanitarium (film) =

1910 film

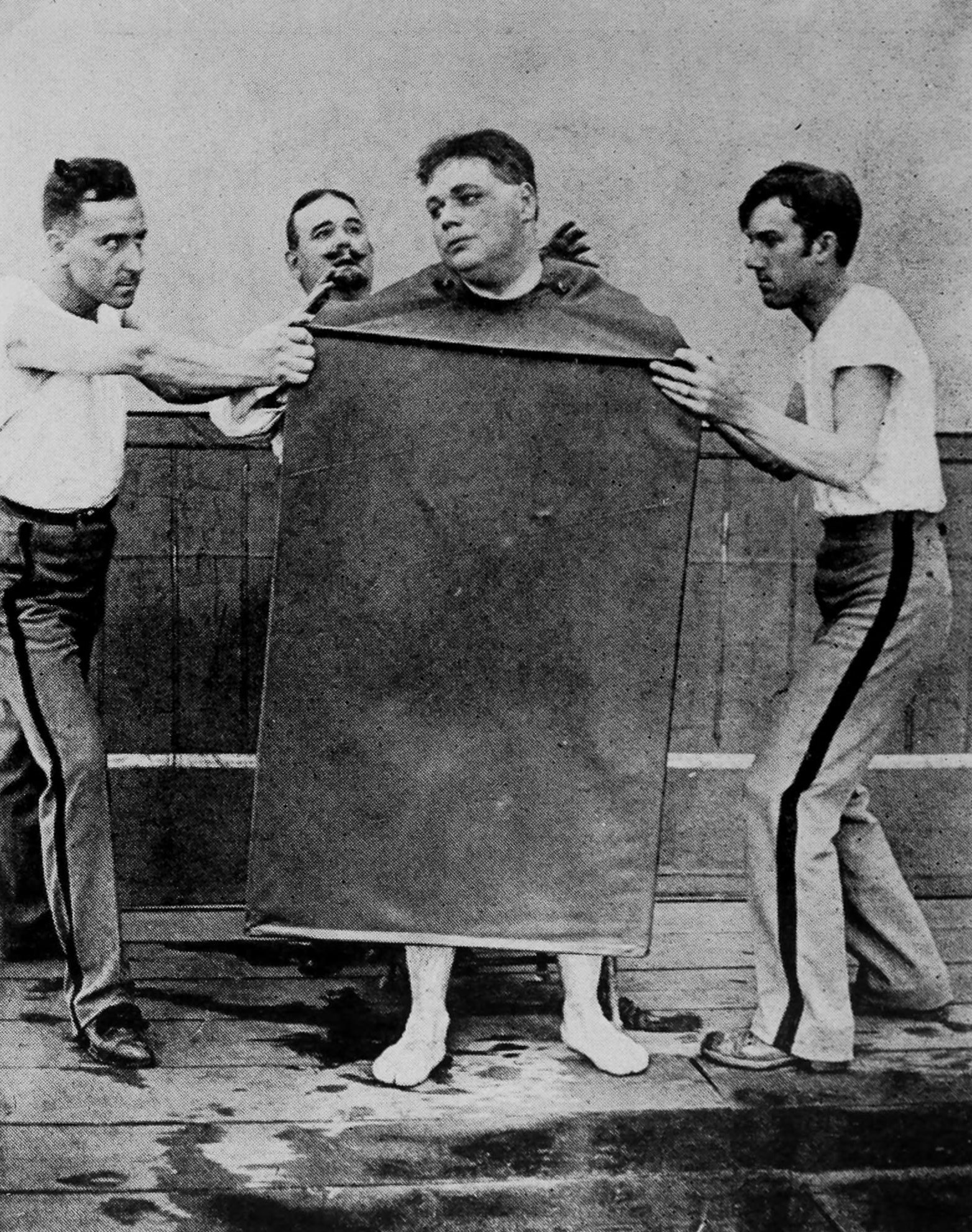
- Still with Roscoe Arbuckle and George Hernandez
- Produced by: William Nicholas Selig
- Starring: Fatty Arbuckle
- Release date: October 10, 1910
- Country: United States
- Language: Silent with English intertitles

The Sanitarium is a 1910 short comedy film featuring Fatty Arbuckle.

== Cast ==
- Roscoe Arbuckle
- Nick Cogley
- George Hernandez

== See also ==
- List of American films of 1910
