= Fast Company (1918 film) =

1918 film

- Directed by: Lynn Reynolds
- Written by: Eugene B. Lewis; Waldemar Young; John McDermott (original story idea)
- Produced by: Bluebird Photoplays
- Starring: Lon Chaney; Franklyn Farnum; Juanita Hansen
- Cinematography: Edward Ullman
- Distributed by: Universal Pictures
- Release date: April 1, 1918
- Running time: 5 reels (50 minutes)
- Country: United States
- Language: Silent (English intertitles)

Fast Company is a 1918 American silent comedy film directed by Lynn Reynolds and starring Juanita Hansen, Edward Cecil, Lon Chaney and Franklyn Farnum. (Lon Chaney had a relatively small role in this film, but the review from Motion Picture News slammed him for "overacting".) The film is today considered lost.

Co-writer Waldemar Young later went on to script a number of Lon Chaney's later silent films, such as The Blackbird, The Unknown and The Unholy Three (1925 version) and collaborated with director Tod Browning as well.

== Plot ==
Lawrence Van Huyler, being constantly goaded by his family regarding his prestige, finds it impossible to be anything but inhibited and a pampered cad. Any rebelliousness is quickly nipped in the bud by his father, Peter Van Huyler. The tearing down of an old house, for generations the home of the Van Huylers, reveals their true family name. Lawrence is delighted to find that he is not of Dutch royalty, but rather Irish, his paternal cognomen having originally been O'Malley, and that he was once related to a common seafaring pirate. At last he can shed the pretense of high birth and act more human, and he sets out to win the hand of his beloved Alicia Vanderveldt, Alicia has abandoned Lawrence for a boisterous braggart named Richard Barnaby, a storyteller who loves to regale the ladies with tales of his romantic exploits in foreign lands.

Learning that his ancestors were really all commoners, Richard defies his father's wishes and takes on a low paying construction job, and sets about confronting the various people at his college who used to ridicule him and call him a pompous fop. When he discovers Richard's exploits are all just manufactured tall tales (which he took from a fictional adventure novel), Lawrence exposes him as a liar in front of everyone and wins Alicia's love when she sees how manly he has become.

== Cast ==
- Franklyn Farnum as Lawrence Percival Van Huyler
- Katherine Griffith as Mrs. Van Huyler
- Lon Chaney as Dan McCarty
- Fred Montague as Peter Van Huyler
- Juanita Hansen as Alicia Vanderveldt
- Edward Cecil as Richard Barnaby

== Reception ==
"This is a light, clean, comedy drama, possessing considerable heart interest that will please any audience. Story holds together well, and ends happily. Supporting cast good, excepting Lon Chaney, who overacts." ---Motion Picture News

"The tale has several good comedy angles, but the scenario has been crudely done...The socialistic trend of the tale gives it a certain topical value and adds something of sympathetic appeal to the character of the hero." ---Variety
