= Up or Down? =

1917 film

- Directed by: Lynn Reynolds
- Written by: Lynn Reynolds
- Starring: George Hernandez; Fritzi Ridgeway; John Gilbert
- Cinematography: Clyde Cook
- Production company: Triangle Film Corporation
- Distributed by: Triangle Distributing
- Release date: November 4, 1917
- Running time: 50 minutes
- Country: United States
- Languages: Silent; English intertitles

Up or Down? is a 1917 American silent Western film directed by Lynn Reynolds and starring George Hernandez, Fritzi Ridgeway and John Gilbert.

== Cast ==
- George Hernandez as Mike
- Fritzi Ridgeway as Esther Hollister
- John Gilbert as Allan Corey
- Elwood Bredell as Boy
- Jack Curtis as 'Texas' Jack
- Graham Pettie as Sheriff
- Edward Burns as Ranch Foreman

== Preservation ==
With no prints of Up or Down? located in any film archives, it is considered a lost film.

== Bibliography ==
- Golden, Eve. John Gilbert: The Last of the Silent Film Stars. University Press of Kentucky, 2013.
