= The Show Down =

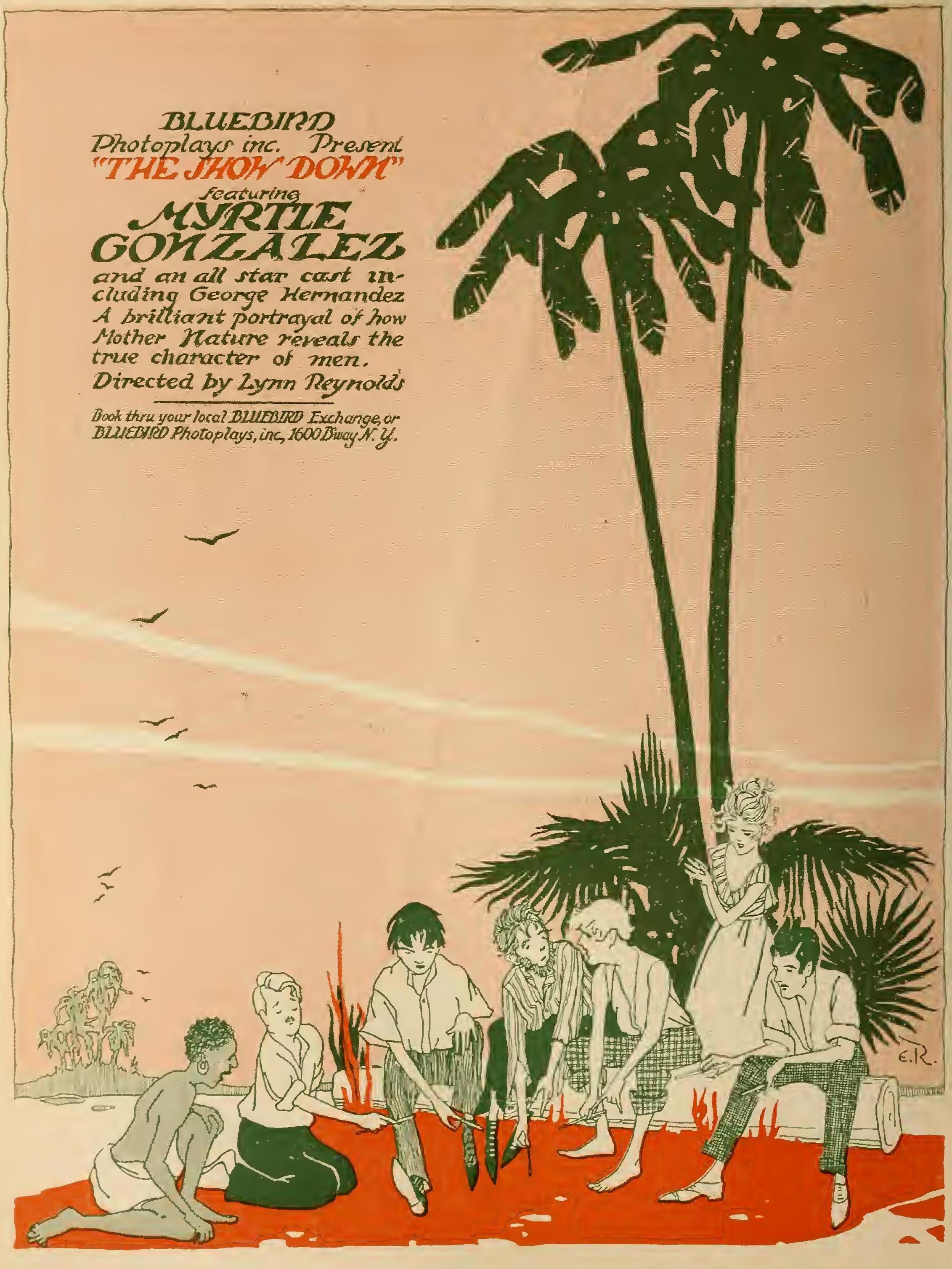
- Directed by: Lynn Reynolds
- Written by: Waldemar Young; Lynn Reynolds
- Starring: Myrtle Gonzalez; George Hernandez; Arthur Hoyt
- Cinematography: Clyde Cook
- Production company: Universal Pictures
- Distributed by: Universal Pictures
- Release date: August 13, 1917
- Running time: 50 minutes
- Country: United States
- Languages: Silent; English intertitles

The Show Down is a 1917 American silent drama film directed by Lynn Reynolds and starring Myrtle Gonzalez, George Hernandez and Arthur Hoyt.

== Cast ==
- Myrtle Gonzalez as Lydia Benson
- George Hernandez as John Benson
- Arthur Hoyt as Oliver North
- George Chesebro as Robert Curtis
- Edward Cecil as Langdon Curtis
- Jean Hersholt as Parkes

== Bibliography ==
- Paul C. Spehr & Gunnar Lundquist. American Film Personnel and Company Credits, 1908-1920. McFarland, 1996.
