= It Happened in Honolulu =

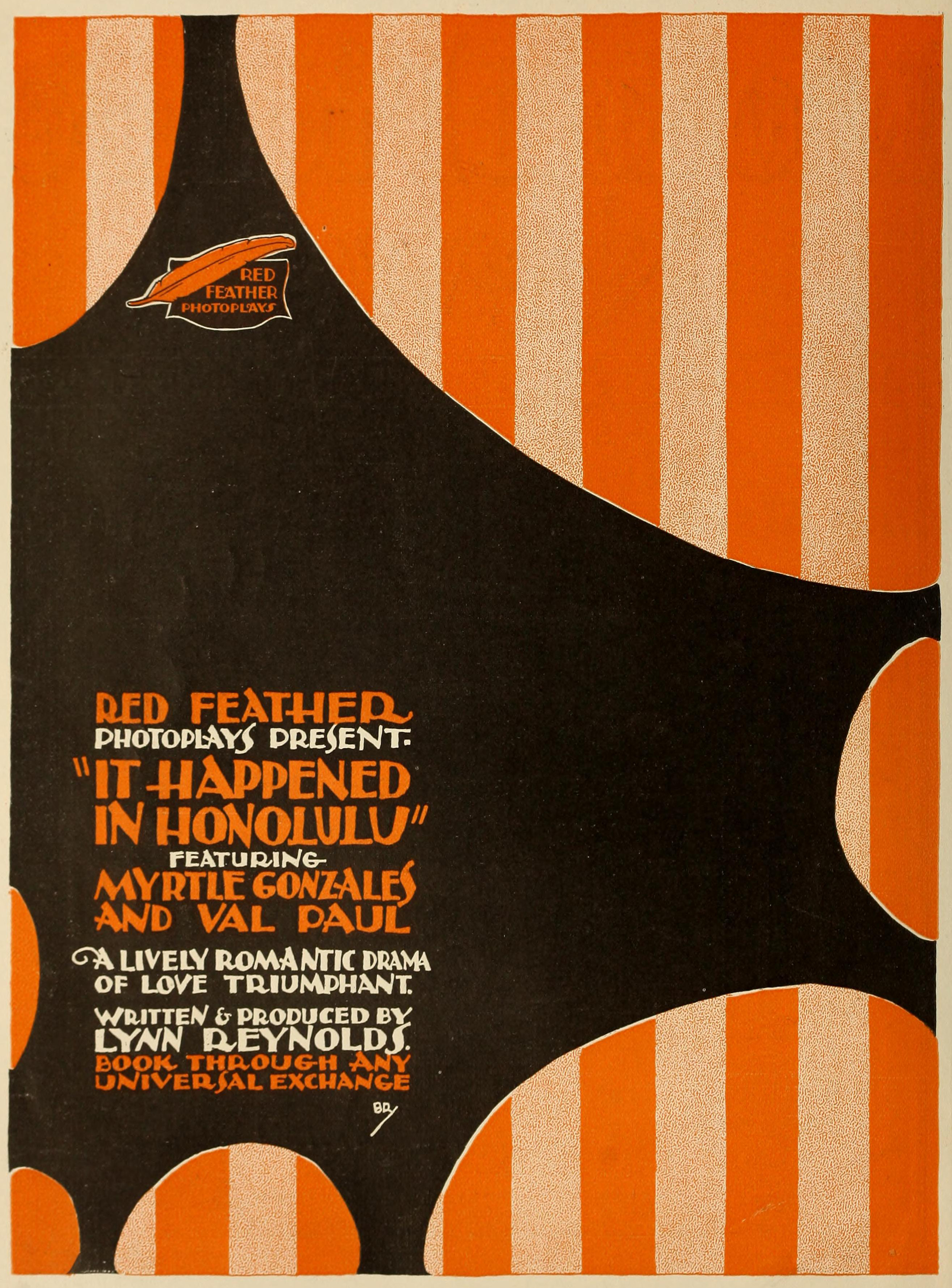
- Directed by: Lynn Reynolds
- Written by: Lynn Reynolds
- Starring: Myrtle Gonzalez; Val Paul; George Hernandez
- Cinematography: Stephen Rounds
- Production company: Universal Pictures
- Distributed by: Universal Pictures
- Release date: June 26, 1916
- Running time: 50 minutes
- Country: United States
- Languages: Silent; English intertitles

It Happened in Honolulu is a 1916 American silent comedy film directed by Lynn Reynolds and starring Myrtle Gonzalez, Val Paul and George Hernandez.

== Cast ==
- Myrtle Gonzalez as Mabel Wyland
- Val Paul as Larry Crane
- George Hernandez as Mr. Wyland
- Lule Warrenton as Mrs. Wyland
- C. Norman Hammond as Jim Crane
- Fred Church as Clarence Velie
- Bertram Grassby as Lord Percy
- Jack Curtis as Detective Boggs

== Bibliography ==
- Robert B. Connelly. The Silents: Silent Feature Films, 1910-36, Volume 40, Issue 2. December Press, 1998.
