= The Chalice of Courage =

1915 silent film

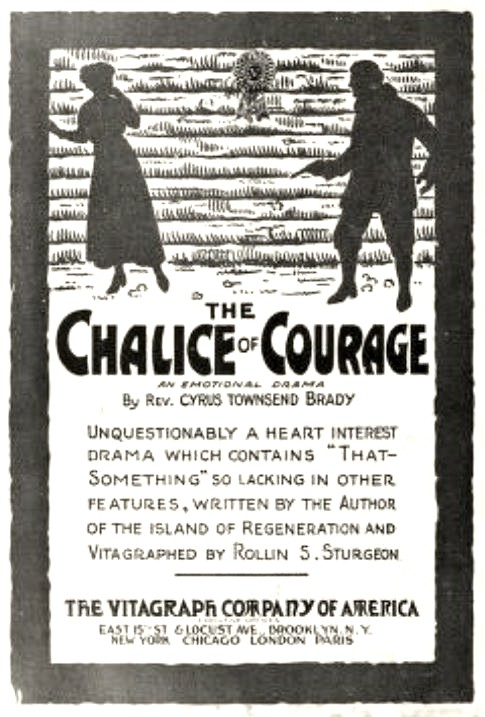
- Theatrical release poster
- Directed by: Rollin S. Sturgeon
- Written by: Cyrus Townsend Brady
- Starring: William Duncan; Myrtle Gonzalez; Natalie De Lontan
- Production company: Vitagraph America Company of America
- Release dates: May 2, 1915 (New York, premiere); August 9, 1915 (USA)
- Running time: 65 minutes
- Country: United States

The Chalice of Courage is a 1915 silent film made by Vitagraph Studios. Based on the novel The Chalice of Courage: a Romance of Colorado by Cyrus Townsend Brady, it was produced and directed by Rollin S. Sturgeon. It is recognized as one of the first films to feature a Latina actress, Myrtle Gonzalez, in a leading role. It is considered the first film in the history of cinema to depict an assisted suicide.

== Plot ==
Set in a Colorado mining community, Louise Rosser is pursued by James Armstrong and they become engaged. Their relationship comes to a swift end after Armstrong's attentions shift to another woman at a dance, and Louise returns her engagement ring. Armstrong leaves for another mining town, and Louise begins a new relationship with William Newbold. William and Louise get married, after which she receives some embarrassing love letters from Armstrong.

Louise and William go on a prospecting trip in the Rocky Mountains and her horse trips, causing both the animal and Louise to tumble down the mountain side. She is severely injured with many broken bones, beyond saving, and in incredible pain. She begs her husband to end her life. In mercy, he draws his gun and shoots her, and then buries her.

After five years pass, Armstrong meets Enid Maitland, a girl from the Eastern United States who is new to the West, and falls in love with her. Enid loves nature and goes into the mountains exploring on her own. She is beset by an American black bear while swimming and cries out in help; drawing the attention of Newbold, now a reclusive mountaineer, who rescues her by killing the animal. She is saved by Newbold a second time during a violent storm in the evening of that same day, with Newbold taking Enid from her campsite to his cabin. Newbold is filled with desire for Enid and contemplates going to her bed while she is sleeping, but stops himself. Snow prevents Enid from traversing out of the mountains and she is forced to stay in Newbold's cabin all winter.

When the coming of Spring melts the snow, Armstrong accompanied by the mountaineer Robert Maitland, Enid's uncle, and the guide Jud Kirby, arrive at Newbold's cabin. Armstrong and Newbold recognize one another and get into a brawl. Armstrong is almost choked to death by Newbold. The fight is broken up by Robert and Jud, but the cabin is a wreck. Enid rejects Armstrong and he shoots himself.

== Cast ==
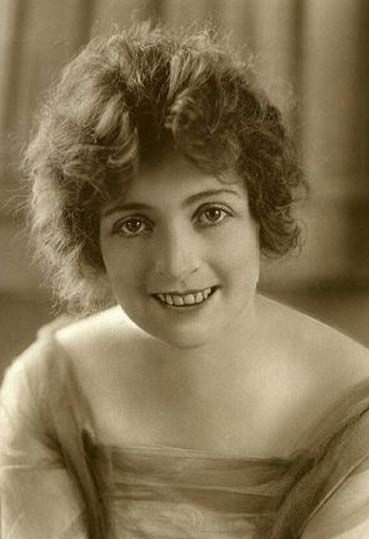
Myrtle Gonzalez

- William Duncan as William Newbold
- Myrtle Gonzalez as Enid Maitland
- Natalie De Lontan as Louise Rosser
- George Holt as James Armstrong
- George Kunkel as Robert Maitland
- William V. Ranous as "Jud" Kirkby
- Otto Lederer as Stephen Maitland
- Anne Schaefer as Mrs. Robert Maitland

== History ==
The Chalice of Courage was adapted from the novel The Chalice of Courage: a Romance of Colorado by Cyrus Townsend Brady. It was made by Vitagraph Studios and premiered on August 9, 1915. It was produced and directed by Rollin S. Sturgeon and was a feature-length film in six reels. While set in the Colorado Rocky Mountains, the film was shot in the mountains of California. The film was praised in The Moving Picture World for its displays of California's topography spanning all four seasons.

The Chalice of Courage was the first film in the history of cinema to depict an assisted suicide, and was one of the earliest films to feature a Latina actress, Myrtle Gonzalez, in a leading role. Variety praised the film's performances, but determined that there was no reason that the film should have been six reels long, and that it contained "considerable padding" that could have been cut.
