= The Greater Law =

1917 American silent drama film

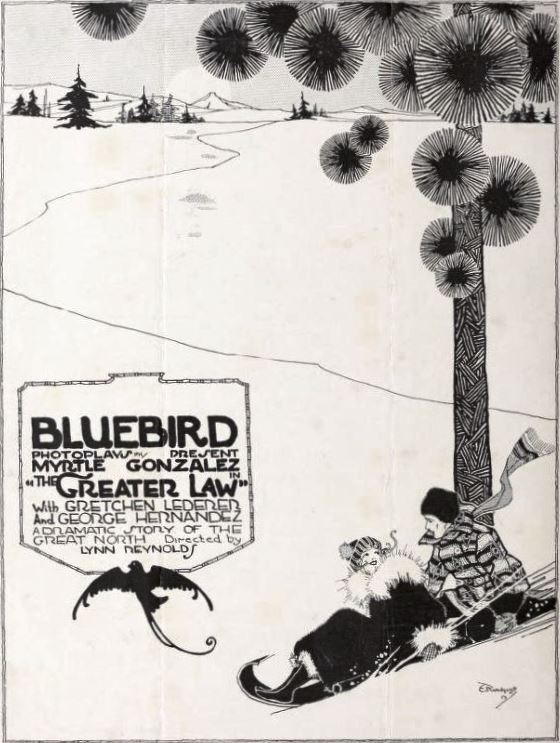
- Directed by: Lynn Reynolds
- Written by: Charles J. Wilson; Lynn Reynolds
- Starring: Myrtle Gonzalez; Gretchen Lederer; George Hernandez
- Cinematography: Clyde Cook
- Production company: Universal Pictures
- Distributed by: Universal Pictures
- Release date: July 16, 1917
- Running time: 50 minutes
- Country: United States
- Languages: Silent; English intertitles

The Greater Law is a 1917 American silent drama film directed by Lynn Reynolds and starring Myrtle Gonzalez, Gretchen Lederer and George Hernandez.

== Cast ==
- Myrtle Gonzalez as Barbara Henderson
- Gretchen Lederer as 'Seattle' Lou
- Maude Emory as Anne Malone
- G. M. Rickerts as Jimmy Henderson
- Lawrence Peyton as Cort Dorian
- George Hernandez as Tully Winkle
- Jack Curtis as Laberge
- Jean Hersholt as Basil Pelly

== Bibliography ==
- Robert B. Connelly. The Silents: Silent Feature Films, 1910-36, Volume 40, Issue 2. December Press, 1998.
