= Lynn Reynolds =

American film director and screenwriter

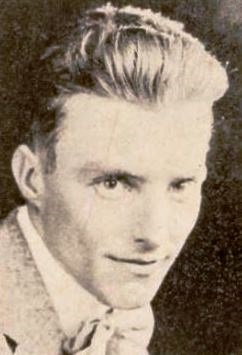
- From a 1920 magazine ad
- Born: Lynn Fairfield Reynolds; May 7, 1889; Harlan, Iowa, United States
- Died: February 25, 1927 (aged 37); Los Angeles, California, United States
- Occupations: Film director Screenwriter
- Years active: 1914–1927
- Spouse: Kathleen O'Connor

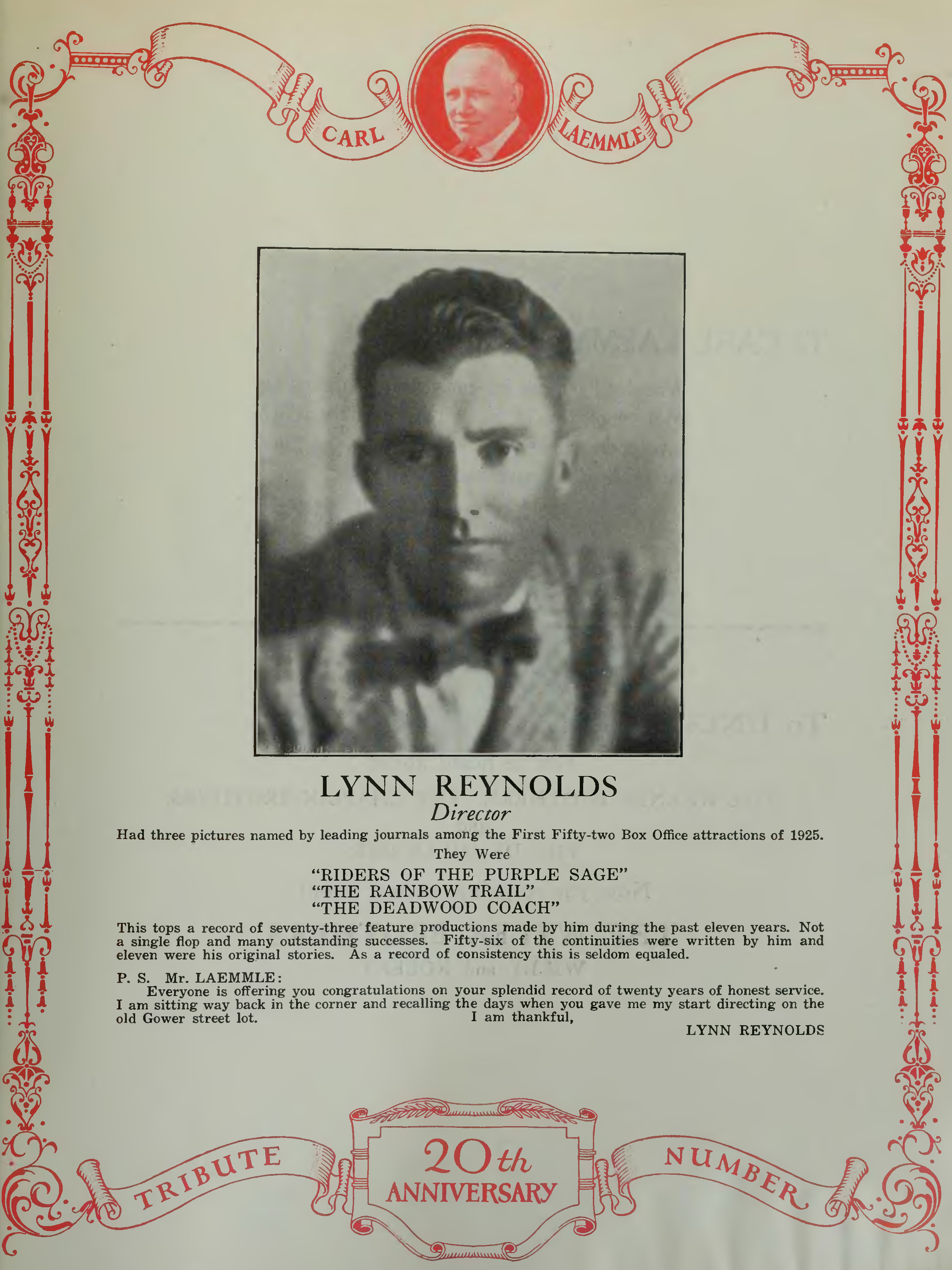
Lynn Reynolds, Director ad in The Film Daily, 1926

Lynn Fairfield Reynolds (May 7, 1889 – February 25, 1927) was an American director and screenwriter. Reynolds directed more than 80 films between 1915 and 1928. He also wrote for 58 films between 1914 and 1927. Reynolds was born in Harlan, Iowa and died in Los Angeles, California, from a self-inflicted gunshot wound.

== Death ==
Returning home in 1927 after being snowbound in the Sierras for three weeks, Reynolds telephoned his wife, actress Kathleen O'Connor, to arrange a dinner party at their Hollywood home with another couple. During the dinner, Reynolds and O'Connor engaged in a heated quarrel in which each accused the other of infidelity. With his guests following in an attempt to calm him down, Reynolds left the table to retrieve a pistol from another room where he shot himself in the head.

== Selected filmography ==
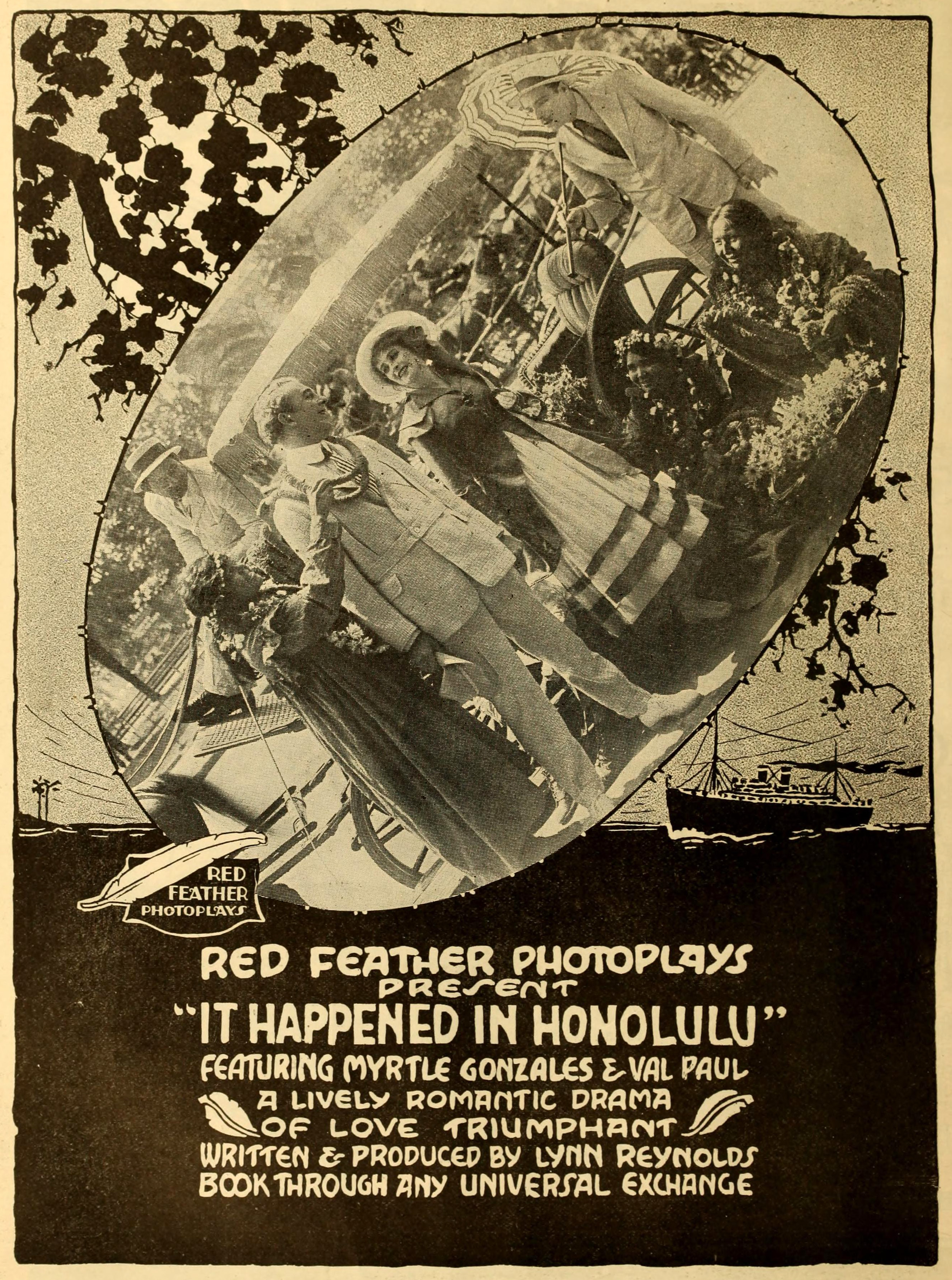
It Happened in Honolulu (1916)

- It Happened in Honolulu (1916)
- The Secret of the Swamp (1916)
- Up or Down? (1917)
- Broadway Arizona (1917)
- The Greater Law (1917)
- The Gown of Destiny (1917)
- Southern Justice (1917)
- God's Crucible (1917)
- The Show Down (1917)
- Mr. Opp (1917)
- Mutiny (1917)
- Fast Company (1918)
- Western Blood (1918)
- Ace High (1918)
- Mr. Logan, U.S.A. (1918)
- Fame and Fortune (1918)
- Treat 'Em Rough (1919)
- Overland Red (1920)
- Bullet Proof (1920)
- The Texan (1920)
- Trailin' (1921)
- Sky High (1922)
- For Big Stakes (1922)
- Up and Going (1922)
- Tom Mix in Arabia (1922)
- Brass Commandments (1923)
- The Huntress (1923)
- The Gunfighter (1923)
- The Last of the Duanes (1924)
- The Deadwood Coach (1924)
- Riders of the Purple Sage (1925)
- The Rainbow Trail (1925)
- Durand of the Bad Lands (1925)
- Chip of the Flying U (1926)
- The Combat (1926)
- The Man in the Saddle (1926)
- The Texas Streak (1926)
- The Buckaroo Kid (1926)
- Prisoners of the Storm (1926)
- The Silent Rider (1927)
- Hey! Hey! Cowboy (1927)
