= Charles J. Wilson =

American screenwriter

Charles J. Wilson Jr. (March 3, 1894—January 22, 1974) was a screenwriter and director in the United States. L. W. Chaudet directed some of the films he wrote. He wrote "The Code of the Klondyke".

== Filmography ==
- The Inspector's Double, with Harry Wulze
- Model 46
- The Oil Smeller
- Jess of the Mountain Country (1914)
- Pat's Pasting Ways (1916)
- Knights of the Bathtub (1916), from a story by Dorothy Barrett
- The Battle for Chili Con Carne (1916)
- The Greater Law (1917)
- Cheyenne's Pal (1917), adaptation of story by John Ford who directed
- The Love Brokers (1918)
- Wild Life (1918), from a story by M. V. Dearing
- Watch Your Watch (1918)
- The Ghost Girl (1919)
- Society for Sale, from story by Ruby Mildred Ayres
