= Myrtle Gonzalez =

American actress (1891–1918)

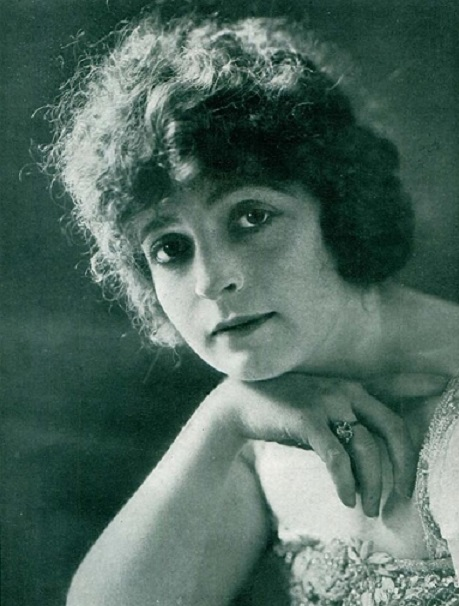
- Gonzalez c. 1916
- Born: September 28, 1891; Los Angeles, California, U.S.
- Died: October 22, 1918 (aged 27); Los Angeles, California, U.S.
- Occupation: Actress
- Years active: 1913–1918
- Spouses: James Parks Jones (m. 1910; div. 1914) Allen Watt (m. 1917)
- Children: 1

Myrtle Gonzalez (September 28, 1891 – October 22, 1918) was an American actress. She starred in at least 78 silent era motion pictures from 1913 to 1917, of which 66 were one and two-reel shorts.

Gonzalez was best known for her role as Enid Maitland in Vitagraph's six-reel feature length drama The Chalice of Courage (1915) opposite William Duncan. A magazine writer once called her "The Virgin White Lily of the Screen".

== Early life ==
Myrtle Gonzalez was born in Los Angeles, California on September 28, 1891, the daughter of Manuel George Gonzalez (1868–1919) and Lillian L. Cook (1874–1932). Her siblings were Stella M. Gonzalez (1892–1965) and Manuel G. Gonzalez Jr. (1898–?). Her father's family was a Hispanic Californio family of Mexico, which had long settled the California territory before the U.S. took it over. Her mother, the daughter of immigrants from Ireland, was a former opera and popular singer. Her father was a retail grocer.

From early childhood, Myrtle displayed remarkable dramatic talent, and she had a good soprano voice. She appeared in many local concerts and benefits and sang in church choirs. She later played juvenile parts on the stage with Fanny Davenport and Florence Stone.

== Movie career ==
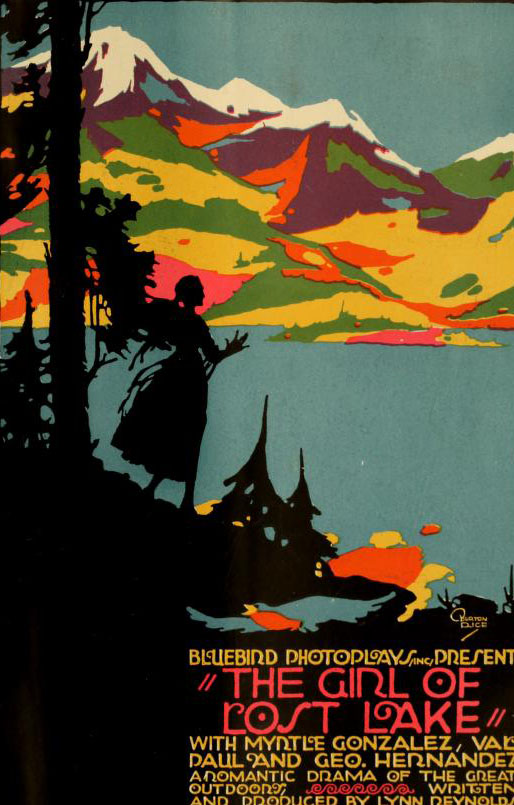
Film advertisement in The Moving Picture World, 1916

Because she grew up in Los Angeles, the shift of movie production to her hometown was a big advantage for her. Gonzalez worked for such studios as Vitagraph and Universal.

Out of a total 80 movies in her career, she appeared in five movies opposite William Desmond Taylor at Vitagraph: the comedy/drama Her Husband's Friend (1913), the drama Tainted Money (1914), the comedy Millions for Defence (1914), the drama The Kiss (1914), and the drama Captain Alvarez (1914).

In 1919, Photoplay Magazine honored Myrtle Gonzalez with a Bronze Plaque for her exceptional performance in “The Mexican,” considered one of her finest roles.

In many of her roles, Gonzalez typified a vigorous out-of-doors type of heroine. During the last six years of her career, many of the movies she starred in were stories of the snow country and of the forests.

== Personal life and death ==
Gonzalez married J. Parks Jones on August 25, 1910. They had one son, James Parks Jones, Jr., and divorced in November, 1914. Gonzalez charged Jones with desertion. On December 1, 1917, she and actor/director Allen Watt (1885–1944) were married in Los Angeles. She gave up her screen work and retired. They had met when Watt was working as an assistant director at Universal. By the time of their marriage, the US had entered World War I and Watt was an officer in the US Army. He was stationed at Camp Lewis, near Tacoma, Washington.

As Gonzalez's health was too frail for the climate, Capt. Watt was placed on the retirement list so he could return her to Southern California. He went back to work at Universal and began directing.

Gonzalez, at age 27, died during the worldwide Spanish flu pandemic of 1918. At the time of her death, she was at her parents' home in Los Angeles, at 908 West Thirtieth Street.

On November 23, 2022, Google featured her in a Google Doodle in the United States. November 23 is the anniversary of the release of the short film The Level (1914), in which she starred.

== Selected filmography ==
- The Courage of the Commonplace (short) (1913)
- The Chalice of Courage (1915)
- A Natural Man (1915)
- The Girl of Lost Lake (1916)
- It Happened in Honolulu (1916)
- The Secret of the Swamp (1916)
- The Greater Law (1917)
- Mutiny (1917)
- God's Crucible (1917)
- Southern Justice (1917)
- The Show Down (1917)

== Bibliography ==
- Doyle, Billy H. (1995). The Ultimate Directory of Silent Screen Performers. pp. 30–31. Metuchen, New Jersey, Scarecrow Press. ISBN 0-8108-2958-4.
