= God's Crucible (1917 film) =

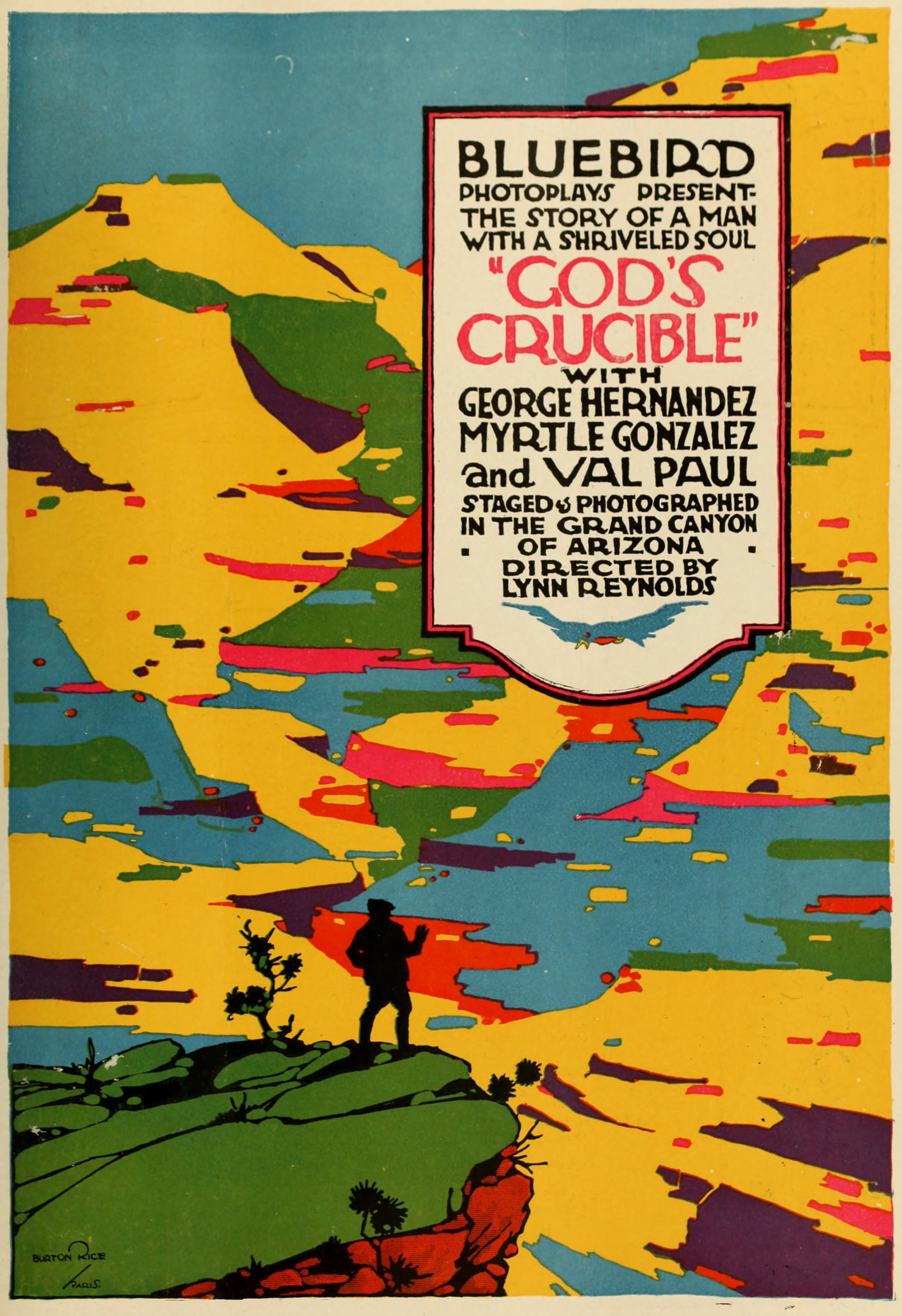
- poster
- Directed by: Lynn Reynolds
- Written by: Lynn Reynolds
- Produced by: Bluebird Photoplays
- Starring: Myrtle Gonzalez
- Cinematography: Clyde R. Cook
- Distributed by: Universal Film Manufacturing Company
- Release date: January 22, 1917
- Country: USA
- Language: Silent...English titles

God's Crucible is a lost 1917 silent film drama directed by Lynn Reynolds and starring Myrtle Gonzalez. It was produced by Bluebird Photoplays and released by Universal Film Manufacturing Company.

== Cast ==
- George Hernandez as Lorenzo Todd
- Val Paul as Warren Todd
- Fred Montague as Dudley Phillips (*as Frederick Montague)
- Myrtle Gonzalez as Virginia Phillips
- Jack Curtis as Oracle Jack
- Ed Brady as Wilkins (*as Edward J. Brady)
- Frankie Lee as Bobby (*as Francis Lee)
- Harry Griffith as Ira Todd (as Harvey Griffith)
