= Jack Curtis (actor) =

American actor (1880–1956)

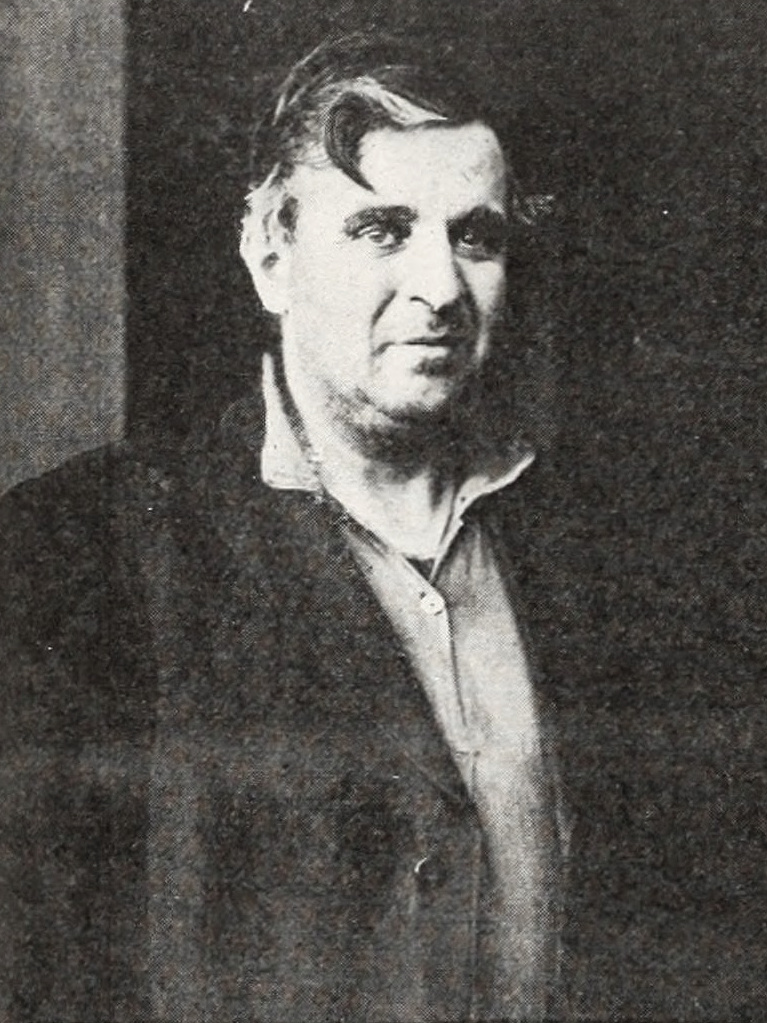
- Curtis c. 1920
- Born: May 28, 1880; San Francisco, California, U.S.
- Died: March 16, 1956 (aged 75); Hollywood, California, U.S.
- Years active: 1915–1950

Jack Curtis (May 28, 1880 – March 16, 1956) was an American actor of the silent era. He appeared in more than 150 films from 1915 to 1950. A California native, he was born in San Francisco and died in Hollywood. Curtis performed on stage and in vaudeville before he began working in films in 1915. He died in 1956 and was buried in Woodlawn Cemetery, Santa Monica.

== Partial filmography ==
- Graft (1915)
- Secret Love (1916)
- The Secret of the Swamp (1916)
- It Happened in Honolulu (1916)
- The Iron Hand (1916)
- The Yaqui (1916)
- Up or Down? (1917)
- Broadway Arizona (1917)
- Mutiny (1917)
- The Greater Law (1917)
- Southern Justice (1917)
- God's Crucible (1917)
- Little Red Decides (1918)
- The Golden Fleece (1918)
- The Last Rebel (1918)
- Treat 'Em Rough (1919)
- The Coming of the Law (1919)
- The Pest (1919)
- The Speed Maniac (1919)
- The Hell Ship (1920)
- The Courage of Marge O'Doone (1920)
- The Big Punch (1921)
- The Torrent (1921)
- Beach of Dreams (1921)
- The Servant in the House (1921)
- Flower of the North (1921)
- Steelheart (1921)
- The Sea Lion (1921)
- The Long Chance (1922)
- The Silent Vow (1922)
- The Strangers' Banquet (1922)
- Two Kinds of Women (1922)
- Canyon of the Fools (1923)
- The Day of Faith (1923)
- Masters of Men (1923)
- Dangerous Trails (1923)
- Greed (1924)
- Captain Blood (1924)
- The Shadow on the Wall (1925)
- The Wedding Song (1925)
- Baree, Son of Kazan (1925)
- The Texas Streak (1926)
- Hearts and Fists (1926)
- Jaws of Steel (1927)
- Through Thick and Thin (1927)
- Brass Knuckles (1927)
- Scarlet Seas (1929)
- The Show of Shows (1929)
- The Love Racket (1929)
- Hold Everything (1930)
- Under a Texas Moon (1930)
- The Love Trader (1930)
- Range Feud (1931)
- Between Fighting Men (1932)
- The Prescott Kid (1934)
- Westward Ho (1935)
- Lawless Range (1935)
- King of the Pecos (1936)
- Stagecoach (1939)
- Trail Riders (1942)
- Song of the Sarong (1945)
- 3 Godfathers (1948)
