= Question of Honor =

Question of Honor may refer to:

- A Question of Honor (1915 film), an American short film directed by B. Reeves Eason
- A Question of Honor (1922 film), an American romance film directed by Edwin Carewe
- A Question of Honour (film), English title of the 1965 Italian comedy-drama film Una questione d'onore directed by Luigi Zampa
- A Question of Honor (1982 film), TV film directed by Jud Taylor
- "A Question of Honour" (song), a 1995 single by Sarah Brightman from her album Fly
