= The Fighting Line =

1919 film

- Directed by: B. Reeves Eason
- Written by: Karl R. Coolidge; Jack Jevne
- Starring: Art Acord
- Cinematography: William M. Edmond
- Distributed by: Universal Film Manufacturing Company
- Release date: November 22, 1919
- Country: United States
- Languages: Silent; English intertitles

The Fighting Line is a 1919 American short silent Western film directed by B. Reeves Eason.

== Plot ==
According to a film magazine, "Mart Long is one of Uncle Sam's watch-dogs on the Boundary line. The cattle stolen in his district are the property of a wealthy rancher, Hereford Jones, whose daughter Mesquite, is Mart's one aim and object in life. Mesquite, asks nothing better than to become Mrs. Mart Long, and the course of true love appears to be smoother than usual. But still smoother is Mason Dalbur, known as a dealer in cattle, for on one side of the line he is clean shaven Mason Dalbur, but on the other side he is the Llano Kid, a bearded ruffian leader of the band of cattle thieves.

Dalbur is also an admirer of Mesquite's. He comes to the Jones' ranch, ostensibly to make a deal, about the time that Mart discovers that a big bunch of Jones' cattle have been rustled across the border. Mesquite's horse goes lame and Dalbur offers to drive her to town in his auto. She goes and he first proposes marriage, and being turned down, proceeds to force his attentions. Mart Long hears her cry and rides to the rescue. He ropes Dalbur at the wheel and forces him to stop the car. He gives Mesquite his horse and tells her to ride to the check house where she can get another horse to take her back to the ranch.

Long gives Dalbur the thrashing of his life, puts his car out of action, ropes another horse and rides to the ranch. Dalbur changes his disguise and gets to the check-house with his men before Mesquite gets away. He is taking her by force when Mart Long and Jones arrive. The Llano Kid and his men outnumbered them by four to one, but Mart, got the upper hand long enough to allow Jones and his daughter to take shelter in the loft and here the three fight until their ammunition runs low. Mart makes a dash through the bandits and rides for help. He meets a troop of U.S. Cavalry patrolling and Uncle Sam comes to the rescue."

== Cast ==
- Art Acord as Mart Long
- Mildred Moore as Mesquite Jones
- Charles Newton as Hereford Jones
- George Field as Mason Dalbur aka The Llano Kid
- Chris Enriques
