= Two Kinds of Love =

Two Kinds of Love may refer to:

- Amores ("The Two Kinds of Love"), work by Lucian
- Two Kinds of Love (film), 1920 film directed by B. Reeves Eason
- Two Kinds of Love, 1983 TV-film directed by Jack Bender
- A 1955 single by Eddy Arnold
- A 1989 single by Stevie Nicks
