= Devil Dog (disambiguation) =

Devil Dog may refer to:

- Devil Dog, a nickname in the U.S. Marines
- Devil Dogs (film), a 1928 film
- Devil Dog: The Hound of Hell, a 1978 horror film
- Devil Dog Dawson, a 1921 American western film
- Devil Dogs, a rock band
- Drake's Devil Dogs, a snack food
- Hellbender, another name for a species of salamander
- Another word for Hellhound
- "Devil Dogs", a song by Swedish heavy metal band Sabaton from the album The Great War (Sabaton album)
- Devil Dog: The Amazing True Story of the Man Who Saved America, 2010 non-fiction book by David Talbot
