= The Kid and the Cowboy =

1919 film

- Directed by: B. Reeves Eason
- Written by: Dorothy Rockfort
- Starring: Art Acord
- Cinematography: William M. Edmond
- Distributed by: Universal Film Manufacturing Company
- Release date: December 6, 1919
- Running time: 2 reels (approximately 20 minutes)
- Country: United States
- Languages: Silent; English intertitles

The Kid and the Cowboy is a 1919 American short silent Western film directed by B. Reeves Eason.

== Plot ==
According to the copyright description, "Jud leaves his wife Flora in their cabin taking Jimsey, their little son, into town on a purchasing expedition. Larkins, who has been hanging around Flora for a long time, finally persuades her to elope, but Larkins that same day gets drunk and shows his violent temper to Flora. She leaves him, but dares not go back to her home. Jud is stunned to find that Flora has left him and their little son. He devotes himself to the child. Larkins meanwhile has found another woman to share his luck, and has taken her to his cabin in the hills.

Jimsey falls ill in spite of Jud’s constant care. The child, in his delirium, calls repeatedly for his mother, and the doctor tells Jud that the only hope for passing the crisis is for the mother to be brought to him. Jud tells the doctor that Flora has eloped with Larkins, and the doctor, who knows all the news of the country, tells Jud that Larkins is the man wanted for various hold-ups in another county, and that he is known to be living with a woman in a cabin up in the hills. Jud determines to get Flora and bring her to Jimsey, so he rides off on the trail of Larkins. He gets him, but only to find that the woman in the cabin is not Flora. Jud rides back, but feeling that his cause is lost—that the boy will die. As he reaches his own cabin he sees a hand draw down the blind. He turns to his horse, and tells his only friend that he guesses Jimsey has gone. At last he forces himself to enter the cabin and sees the child stretched on the bed. He is just going to throw himself down at the child’s side in an outburst of grief when Flora, who has heard of Jimsey’s illness and returned in time to help the child past the crisis, stops him and tells him that the danger is past—Jimsey is sleeping peacefully."

== Cast ==
- Art Acord as Jud
- Mildred Moore as Flora, Jud's Wife
- B. Reeves Eason, Jr. as Jimsey, Jud's Son (as Breezy Eason)
- Dagmar Godowsky as Dance Hall Girl
- George Field as Larkin (as George Fields)
- Andrew Waldron as The Drunk
- Charles Newton as A Rancher
