= The Two Sentences =

- Directed by: Tom Ricketts
- Written by: Bertie Badger Moyers (Story)
- Starring: Harry Van Meter; Perry Banks; Jack Richardson; Louise Lester; Vivian Rich; David Lythgoe
- Production company: American Film Manufacturing Company
- Distributed by: Mutual Film
- Release date: March 15, 1915
- Country: United States
- Languages: Silent film English intertitles

The Two Sentences is a 1915 American silent short drama film directed by Tom Ricketts starring Harry Van Meter, Perry Banks, Jack Richardson, Louise Lester, Vivian Rich, and David Lythgoe.

== Plot ==
According to a film magazine, "Jim Rodgers, a rising young lawyer, returns to the city to find that Helen Wade, his fiancee, has become the wife of another man. Rodgers buries himself in his profession. Later, as judge of the criminal court, he is called upon to try Helen's husband, Tom Carter, on a charge of assault to kill. Tom is found guilty, and Helen goes to Rodgers and pleads that he make the sentence one year only, not twenty. Rodgers replies that since she had not hesitated to give him a life sentence, banishing him out of her affections forever, he fails to see why she should expect him to deal so magnanimously with her husband. The following day he gives Tom a long sentence. As time passes, Rodgers grows to regret his vindictiveness. When he is named as candidate for governor he accepts, chiefly because by this means he may become empowered to pardon Tom Carter. Helen determines to prevent his election. On the eve of apparent defeat, she tells him it is she who has been ruining his chances. Rodgers convinces her, however, of his real motive, the election is turned, Tom and Helen are reunited and Rodgers serves out his life sentence alone."

== Cast ==
- Harry Van Meter as Jim Rodgers
- Perry Banks as Jeff Wade
- Louise Lester as Mrs. Jeff Wade
- Vivian Rich as Helen Wade - Daughter
- Reaves Eason as William Ford
- Jack Richardson as Fred Clark
- Charlotte Burton as Nellie Carter
- David Lythgoe as Tom Carter
