= Heart of Flame =

- Directed by: Tom Ricketts
- Written by: Marie Layet
- Starring: Vivian Rich; David Lythgoe; Harry von Meter
- Distributed by: Mutual Film
- Release date: March 1, 1915
- Country: United States
- Languages: Silent film English intertitles

Heart of Flame is a 1915 American silent short drama film directed by Tom Ricketts, starring Vivian Rich, David Lythgoe and Harry von Meter.

== Plot ==
Keith Gordon (Lythgoe) is torn between pursuing a career as a violinist and a relationship with Zira, a local girl (Rich).

== Cast ==
- Vivian Rich as Zira, a mountain girl
- David Lythgoe as Keith Gordon
- Jack Richardson as Checo
- Charlotte Burton as Beppa
- Louise Lester as Nita
- Harry von Meter as Von Erzforf
- Reeves Eason
- William Vaughn
