= Archer MacMackin =

American film director

- Born: Archibald Paul McMakin; February 7, 1888; Lake City, Iowa, U.S.
- Died: February 8, 1961 (aged 73); Des Moines, Iowa, U.S.
- Other names: Archie MacMackin; Arthur Macklin; A. McMackin; Archer McMackin
- Occupations: Director, producer, screenwriter
- Years active: 1912–1920
- Spouses: Grace A. Hundley (m. 1910–1920) Cora Ida Cushion (m. 1942–1955)

Archer MacMackin (February 7, 1888 – February 8, 1961) was an American silent film director, producer, and screenwriter. McMackin directed over seventy-three films between 1912 and 1916 directing films such as When Empty Hearts Are Filled and The Altar of Ambition in 1915 working with actors such as Harry von Meter, Louise Lester, Vivian Rich and David Lythgoe. His career reached its height in 1916 where in that year alone he directed thirty short films.

== Early life ==
McMackin was born in Lake City, Iowa. He had one older brother named Laurence. His father was Dr. William McMackin and his mother was Mary Isabelle Myers. With the death of MacMackin's father in 1900, the family faced extreme financial hardship. At the age of 12, MacMackin moved in with his maternal grandparent (M.C. Myers), his aunt (Luma Myers), and his bachelor uncle (George Myers) in Salem, Illinois, while Mary took a teaching job in a private school in Macon, Bibb Co., Georgia that her sister and brother-in-law had arranged for her in the school where they taught.

== Film career ==
MacMackin got connected to the motion picture studios in Chicago. In 1909 he was in charge of buying new stories for Essanay Studios. He would put advertisements in periodicals directed at writers telling authors what type of stories Essanay was currently purchasing and giving his name and the studio address for the budding authors to send their submissions.

In May 1913, a portion of the Essanay film company moved from Chicago to Ithaca, New York – among them was MacMackin who was now working as an assistant director. The head of Essanay in Ithaca was Theodore Wharton. Ithaca was chosen because Wharton wanted to make college films and hoped to film at the university. Ithaca was also chosen due to the scenic waterfalls and natural gorges around it which photographed well. A final requirement for early film making was direct sunlight in which to photograph even indoor scenes; this was provided by a glass-domed stadium owned by the college which became the film studio. Francis X. Bushman and Beverly Bayne appeared as the stars in the Essanay films being filmed in Ithaca. David Hargen was the camera operator and Al Tracey was the property manager.

MacMackin directed his first film, The 'Lemon', starring Whitney Raymond in 1912. The following year he directed two films including The Way Perilous, and produced four of which he also directed. In 1915, he directed thirty six films, serving as a writer for six. By 1917, MacMackin had directed seventy-four pictures and was working at Edward Small Inc. in New York City where he lived with his family. He worked as a writer on his final film, the 1920 comedy The Rookie's Return, starring Douglas MacLean. Many of his works were connected with Frank Borzage.

== Later career ==
During the 1930s, Archer MacMackin took a job with the Federal Theatre Project, traveling throughout the United States giving week-long workshops on how to construct marionettes, write scripts, and give puppet shows. Archer also wrote a book about the art of puppetry, Puppetry: Training Course Manual, in 1941 which was published in a mimeographed book which was then bound.

== Personal life ==
MacMackin divorced his first wife Grace in 1920. In 1930, MacMackin moved to Des Moines, Iowa, and worked as a landscaper. He married his second wife Cora Ida Cushion in 1942. She had three children from a previous marriage that MacMackin helped to raise. During this marriage, MacMackin and his new family lived in Eddyville, Iowa. MacMackin and Cushion divorced in 1955.

MacMackin (along with his second wife) later converted to The Church of Jesus Christ of Latter-day Saints. He would go on to write a play concerning the Restored Gospel.

== Death ==
MacMackin died on February 8, 1961, in Des Moines. He and his mother are buried beside each other in the Promise City Cemetery in Wayne County, Iowa.

== Selected filmography ==
=== Director ===
- Teaching a Liar a Lesson (1912)
- After the Reward (1912)
- The Final Judgment (1913)
- Sunlight (1913)
- The Madonna (1915)
- Ex-Convict 4287 (1915)
- Green Apples (1915)
- Touring with Tillie (1915)
- Billy Van Deusen's Last Fling (1915)
- A Girl, a Guard, and a Garret (1915)
- Mischief and a Mirror (1916)
- Billy Van Deusen and the Vampire (1916)
- Cupid at Cohen's (1916)
- Number Please? (1916)
- Billy Van Deusen's Ancestry (1916)
- Billy Van Deusen's Fiancée (1916)

=== Producer ===
- The Whip Hand (1913)
- The Right of Way (1913)
- The Way Perilous (1913)
- The Love Lute of Romany (1913)

=== Writer ===
- Refugees
- Dixie's Day Off (1915)
- Fares, Please! (1915)
- Skipper Simpson's Daughter (1915)
- She Winked (1915)
- No Soup (1915)
- The Pointed Finger (1917)
- The Winged Mystery (1917)
- The Purple Lily (1918)
- The Rookie's Return (1920)
