= Coals of Fire =

Coals of Fire may refer to:

- Coals of Fire (1915 film), directed by Tom Ricketts
- Coals of Fire (1918 film), directed by Victor Schertzinger
