= The Hurricane Kid =

1925 film directed by Edward Sedgwick

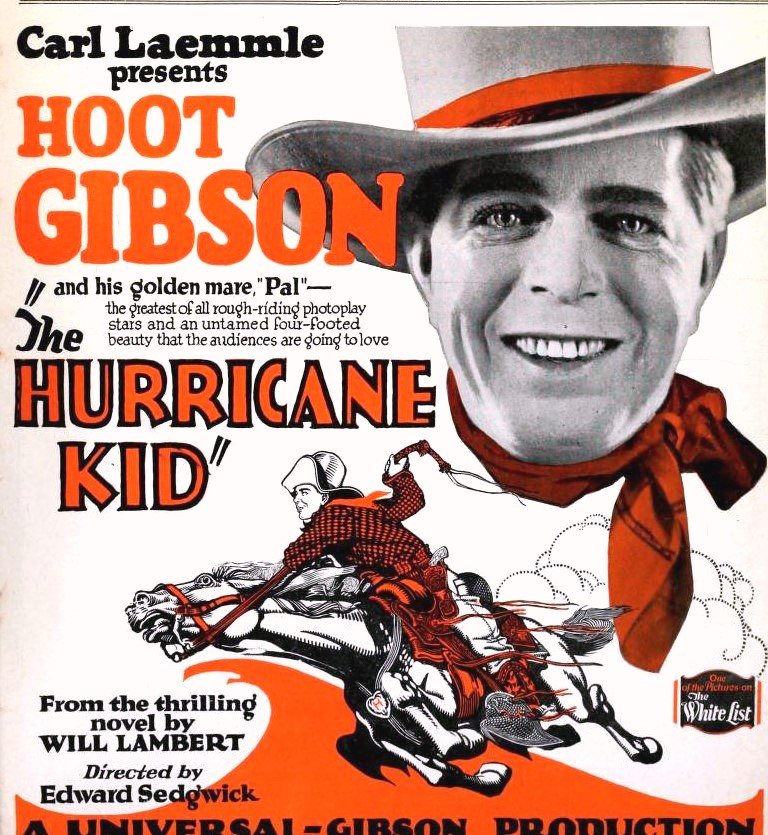
- Tradeadvertisement
- Directed by: Edward Sedgwick
- Written by: E. Richard Schayer; Raymond L. Schrock
- Based on: story by Will Lambert
- Produced by: Carl Laemmle
- Starring: Hoot Gibson; Marian Nixon
- Cinematography: Virgil Miller
- Distributed by: Universal Pictures
- Release date: January 25, 1925
- Running time: 6 reels
- Country: United States
- Languages: Silent; English intertitles

The Hurricane Kid is a 1925 American silent Western film directed by Edward Sedgwick and starring Hoot Gibson. It was produced and released by Universal Pictures.

== Plot ==
As described in a review in a film magazine, the Hurricane Kid falls in love with one young woman after another. When he breaks his arm, Joan takes him to her father Colonel Langdon's ranch. Foreman Lafe Baxter is jealous, and the Kid whips him in a fist fight for insulting Joan. The Colonel and ranchman Hezekiah Potts stage a horse race and bet their ranches. The Kid tames Pal, a wild mare of great speed which the Colonel had captured and then turned loose, and the Kid wins the race on that horse. Joan, who has mocked him for playing the gallant, now relents.

== Cast ==
- Hoot Gibson as The Hurricane Kid
- Marian Nixon as Joan Langdon (credited as Marion Nixon)
- William Steele as Lafe Baxter (credited as William A. Steele)
- Arthur Mackley as Colonel Langdon (credited as Arthur Machley)
- Violet La Plante as Joan's Friend
- Harry Todd as Hezekiah Potts
- Fred Humes as Jed Hawks

== See also ==
- Hoot Gibson filmography

== Preservation ==
A print of The Hurricane Kid is listed as being held by the Danish Film Institute.
