= When Empty Hearts Are Filled =

- Vivian Rich and Harry von Meter
- Directed by: Arthur Macklin
- Starring: Louise Lester; Vivian Rich; Harry von Meter
- Production company: American Film Manufacturing Company
- Distributed by: Mutual Film
- Release date: May 5, 1915
- Running time: 1 reel
- Country: United States
- Languages: Silent film English intertitles

When Empty Hearts Are Filled is a 1915 American silent short drama film directed by Archer MacMackin starring Louise Lester, Vivian Rich, and Harry von Meter.

== Plot ==
According to a film trade magazine, "Paul Latham and his wife, Nancy, live in a small fishing village and by careful saving, not only own their home, but have purchased a fishing boat. One day their happy existence receives a severe shock. Paul meets with an accident which leaves him a cripple [sic] for life and in his helplessness decides to end it all by suicide. He is prevented by Nancy, who has found, strapped to a hatch, a three-year-old child evidently washed ashore from some wreck. Unable to trace the boy's identity, his presence brings a new interest into the cripple's life and his wife prays that the child will never be taken from them.

Three years pass by, and little Tom has grown to be a sturdy boy of six when Paul's heart is again made empty by reading a newspaper article stating that a Mr. and Mrs. Bayly, whose child was lost in the wreck of the Oceanic on Jan. 20, 1910, were stopping at a nearby hotel. The article also stated that the child had been strapped to a hatch by the nurse, but that no trace has ever been found of the boy. Paul consults his diary, where he finds an entry under date of Jan. 20, 1910, reading, "Nancy "found a baby boy washed ashore on the beach," and, feeling sure that little Tommy is Mrs. Bayly's child, it is decided to let the parents know that their child is alive. This heart breaking duty performed, Paul's life becomes a misery to him, awaiting the arrival of the people who are to take the child away. 'When the child is presented to the Bayly's the anxious parents declare that their child was a girl, and Paul's empty heart is again filled with joy, which remains until his death."

== Cast ==
- Harry von Meter as Paul Latham
- Vivian Rich as Nancy Latham
- Louise Lester as Margaret Bayly
- G.E. Rainey as John Bayly
- B. Reaves Eason as A fisherman
