= The Moon Riders (serial) =

1920 film

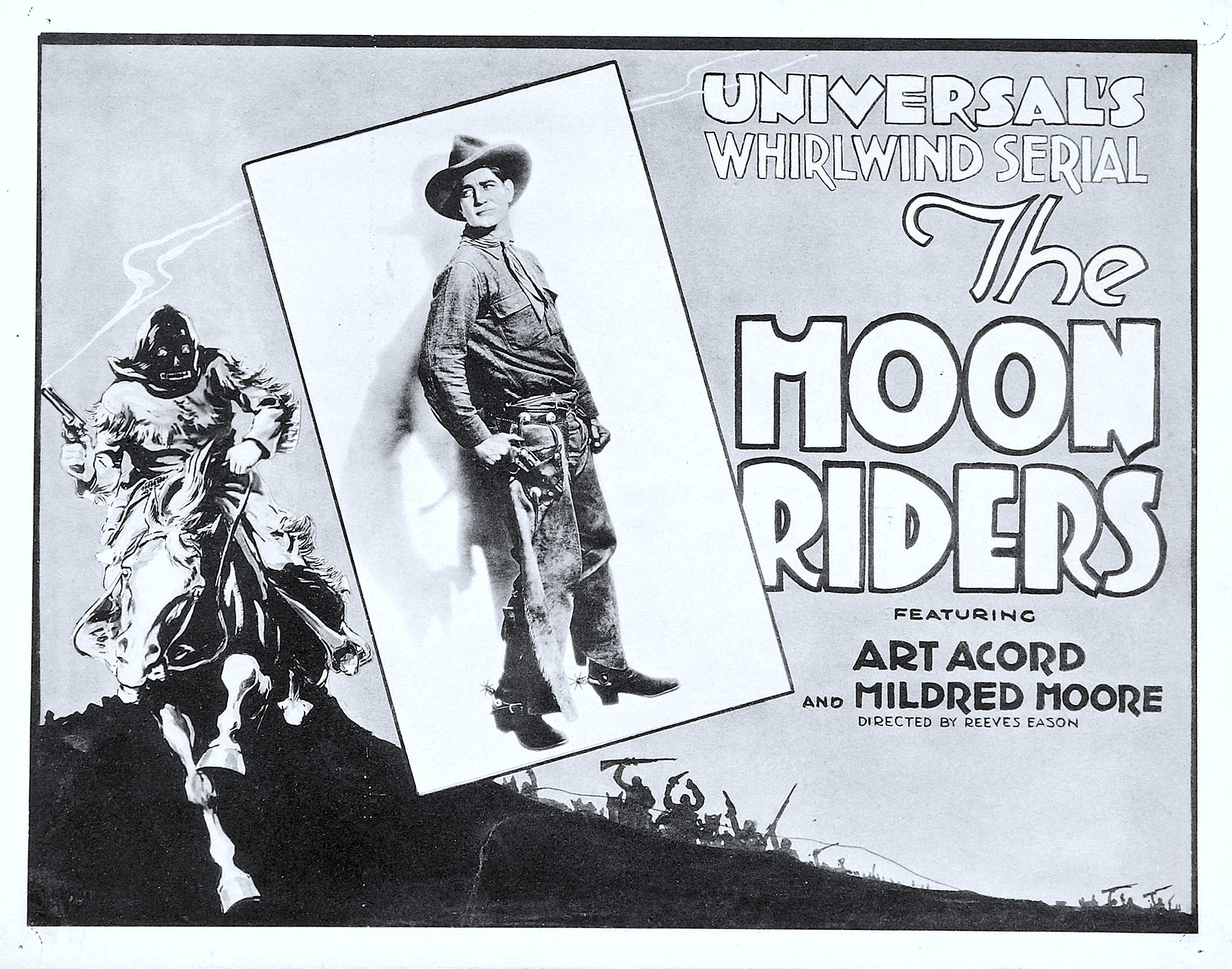
- Lobby card for the series.
- Directed by: B. Reeves Eason; Theodore Wharton
- Written by: Karl R. Coolidge; George Hively; William Pigott; Albert Russell; Theodore Wharton
- Story by: Karl R. Coolidge; George Hively; William Pigott; Albert Russell; Theodore Wharton
- Starring: Art Acord; Mildred Moore
- Cinematography: William M. Edmond; Alfred H. Lathem; Howard Oswald
- Distributed by: Universal Film Manufacturing Co.
- Release date: April 26, 1920
- Running time: 360 minutes (18 episodes)
- Country: United States
- Languages: Silent; English intertitles

The Moon Riders is a 1920 American silent Western film serial directed by B. Reeves Eason and Theodore Wharton. The serial is considered lost. It ran for 18 episodes.

== Cast ==
- Art Acord as Buck Ravelle, a Ranger
- Charles Newton as Arizona Baldwin
- Mildred Moore as Anna Baldwin, Arizona's Daughter
- George Field as Egbert, Leader of the Moon Riders
- Beatrice Dominguez as Rosa, Housekeeper's Daughter
- Tote Du Crow as Warpee, the Indian Chief
- Albert MacQuarrie as Gant, a crooked attorney

== Reception ==
The Moon Riders is considered to be one of the more successful serials of the silent film era and it established Art Acord as a western star.

== Chapter titles ==
1. Over the Precipice
2. The Masked Marauders
3. The Red Rage of Jealousy
4. Vultures of the Hills
5. The Death Trap
6. Caves of Mystery
7. The Menacing Monster
8. The Moon Rider's Bride
9. Death's Door
10. The Pit of Fire
11. The House of Doom
12. Unmasked
13. His Hour of Torture
14. The Flaming Peril
15. Rushing Waters
16. Clearing Skies

== See also ==
- List of film serials
- List of film serials by studio
