= The Winged Mystery =

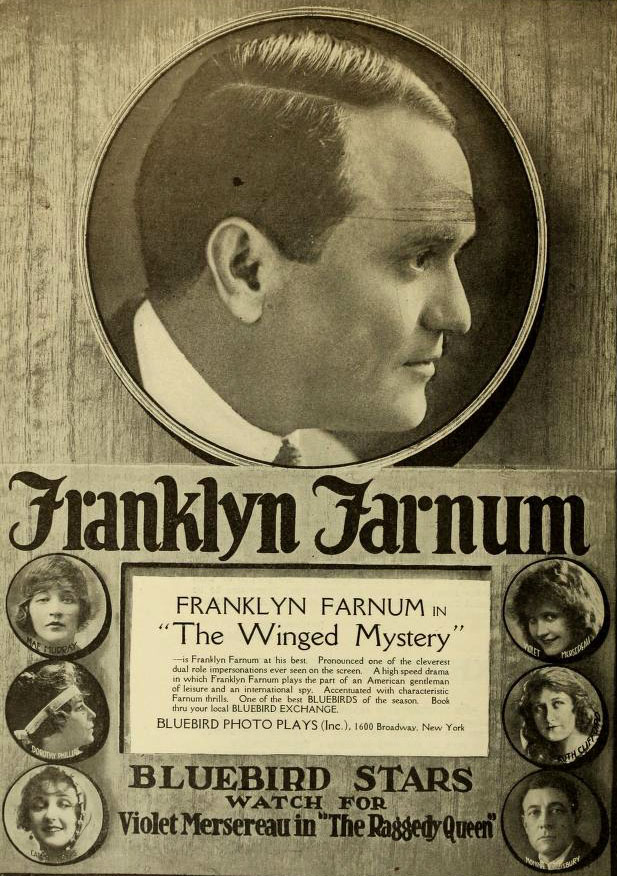
- Directed by: Joseph De Grasse
- Written by: Archer MacMackin; William Parker
- Starring: Franklyn Farnum; Claire Du Brey; Rosemary Theby
- Production company: Universal Pictures
- Distributed by: Universal Pictures
- Release date: November 4, 1917
- Running time: 50 minutes
- Country: United States
- Languages: Silent; English intertitles

The Winged Mystery is a 1917 American silent war film directed by Joseph De Grasse and starring Franklyn Farnum, Claire Du Brey and Rosemary Theby.

== Cast ==
- Franklyn Farnum as Capt. August Sieger / Louis Siever
- Claire Du Brey as Gerda Anderson
- Rosemary Theby as Shirley Wayne
- Charles Hill Mailes as Josiah Wayne
- Sam De Grasse as Mortimer Eddington
- T.D. Crittenden as Henry Waltham Steele
- Fred Montague as Capt. Bernard

== Bibliography ==
- Robert B. Connelly. The Silents: Silent Feature Films, 1910-36, Volume 40, Issue 2. December Press, 1998.
