= Arthur Mackley =

English actor

- Born: 3 July 1865; Portsmouth, Hampshire, England
- Died: 21 December 1926 (aged 61); Los Angeles, California, U.S.
- Occupations: Actor, film director
- Years active: 1910–1925

Arthur Mackley (3 July 1865 – 21 December 1926) was an English actor and director of the silent era. He appeared in more than 150 films between 1910 and 1925. He frequently took the part of a sheriff in Westerns, earning the nickname "Sheriff" Mackley. He also directed 64 films between 1911 and 1915, at least 26 for Reliance-Mutual release.

He was born in Portsmouth, Hampshire, England, and died in Los Angeles, California, United States.

== Selected filmography ==
- Alkali Ike's Auto (1911)
- Across the Plains (1911)
- The Honor System (1917)
- The Crow (1919)
- The Feud (1919)
- The Sheriff's Oath (1920)
- Devil Dog Dawson (1921)
- Shootin' for Love (1923)
- The Hurricane Kid (1925)
