= Dorothy Rockfort =

American screenwriter

- Born: Mildred Dorothy Rochfort; June 17, 1877; Lympstone, England
- Died: August 28, 1924; Los Angeles, California, USA
- Occupation: Screenwriter
- Years active: 1914–1920
- Spouse: William Pigott

Dorothy Rockfort, born Mildred Dorothy Rochfort (June 17, 1877-August 28, 1924), was a screenwriter who worked in Hollywood during the silent era. She primarily worked on short Westerns and serials. She was married to fellow screenwriter William Pigott, who later got involved in real estate after leaving the business.

== Biography ==
Dorothy was born in England in 1877 to D'Oyly Rochfort and Constance Caley. The family immigrated to the Canada in the 1880s when Dorothy was a girl, and eventually made their way to Sausalito, California, where Dorothy married William Pigott in 1910.

Dorothy and William worked on a number of Western films and serials at Universal during the 1910s; Dorothy's last known screen credit was on 1920's Hair Trigger Stuff. She died in 1924 and was buried at Forest Lawn Memorial Park in Glendale, California.

== Select filmography ==
- Hair Trigger Stuff (1920)
- The Counterfeit Trail (1919)
- The Kid and the Cowboy (1919)
- Tempest Cody, Kidnapper (1919)
- The Ranger of Pikes Peak (1919)
- Tempest Cody Gets Her Man (1919)
- At the Point of a Gun (1919)
- The Jack of Hearts (1919)
- Kingdom Come (1919)
- The Law of the Wilds (1915)
