= Viviana (film) =

1916 film

- Directed by: B. Reeves Eason
- Starring: Sylvia Ashton
- Distributed by: Mutual Film
- Release date: January 10, 1916
- Country: United States
- Language: Silent with English intertitles

Viviana is a 1916 American short drama film directed by B. Reeves Eason.

== Cast ==
- Sylvia Ashton
- Marion Christie
- George Periolat
- Leslie Reed
- Vivian Rich
