= The Barren Gain =

1915 film by B. Reeves Eason

- Directed by: B. Reeves Eason
- Starring: Charlotte Burton
- Distributed by: Mutual Film
- Release date: September 29, 1915
- Country: United States
- Languages: Silent; English intertitles

The Barren Gain is a 1915 American silent short drama film directed by Henry Otto and B. Reeves Eason.

== Plot ==
A novelist writes a new book, and he has to teach a young girl how to write. Both of them form a loving relationship.

== Cast ==
- Charlotte Burton
- Nan Christy
- Teddy Lynch
- Jack Richardson
- Vivian Rich
- Walter Spencer
