= Across the Plains (1911 film) =

1911 film

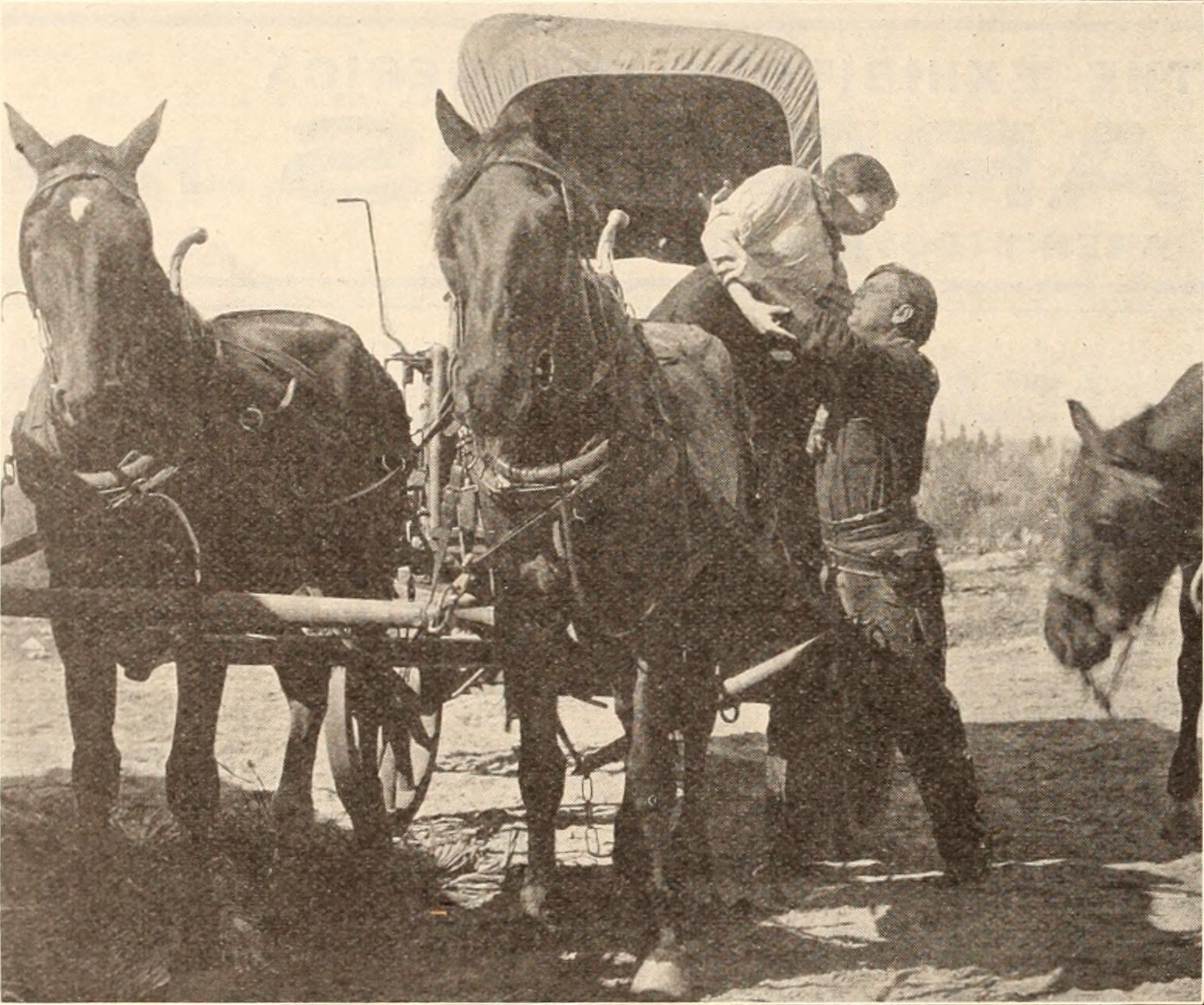
- Directed by: Broncho Billy Anderson; Thomas H. Ince
- Written by: Broncho Billy Anderson; Thomas H. Ince
- Produced by: Broncho Billy Anderson
- Starring: Broncho Billy Anderson; Gladys Field
- Cinematography: Jess Robbins
- Distributed by: General Film Company
- Release date: April 1, 1911
- Running time: 1 reel
- Country: United States
- Languages: Silent; English intertitles

Across the Plains is a 1911 American silent Western film directed by Broncho Billy Anderson and Thomas H. Ince and starring Anderson.

The film's plot has Jennie Lee and her father heading to California in a prairie schooner. Jennie Lee's father becomes intoxicated before Indians attack them for trespassing on the land. Unable to convince her father to get in the carriage, Jennie Lee flees and races the Indians and is led to a deserted shack by a cowboy as his partner heads off for aid. The two are saved as the ranchmen return and disperse the Indians.

The film was not released with a cast of credits as typical of its production era. The production took place on the Miller Brothers 101 Ranch and was released under the Essany label. The completed film was approximately 990 feet in length and was met with mixed reviews. The film's status is unknown, but likely lost.

== Plot summary ==
A summary of the plot was provided in The Nickelodeon states, "Jennie Lee and her father are on their way to Golden California, from a little Kansas farm, traveling in a prairie schooner. At the last settlement, visited by the two, the old man, who has a weakness for drink, purchases several bottles of [whiskey], which he begins drinking when they have made camp for the night. A lone cowboy calls upon them and finds the old man in a jovial mood and cautions him to beware: of a hostile tribe of Indians, through whose country they are now traveling. Unmindful of the warning, Lee continues to drink until thoroughly intoxicated, despite the pleadings of his daughter. Suddenly, over the brow of a hill a scouting Indian is seen to appear, sees the wagon and the drunken white, and slipping cautiously away, goes to his Indian village where he informs the other braves of the trespassing settlers. The Indians leap astride their shaggy ponies and with war whoops ride off to make short work of the whites. The girl sees them coming and implores her father to get into the wagon, but he refuses and the girl, knowing that she must act quickly if she would save her own life, springs into the wagon, seizes the reins and urges the horses to their utmost speed. After a long and thrilling ride in which the Indians gradually gain on her, she is joined by the friendly cowboy, who sends a crony who was with him, to a neighboring ranch for help. The girl and cowboy race the Indians and pull up at a deserted shack in which they protect themselves against the Indians until the arrival of the ranchmen, who disperse the Indians. The girl expresses her great joy at being rescued and upon proposal of her cowboy protector that she marry him, she readily agrees."

== Cast ==
Film credits were almost universally unheard of in 1910 and 1911. Because the film's actors were unidentified, fans would often come up with their own names for prominent actors. Film studios were reluctant to credit the actors because other studios might hire them, or the actors could demand a higher wage. Due to public demand and interest, studios began adding credits to their film lists in later productions. (Note: The unsourced part of cast list reproduced here comes from the Internet Movie Database.)

- Broncho Billy Anderson as The Cowboy
- Gladys Field as Jennie Lee
- Arthur Mackley as Jennie's Father
- John B. O'Brien as The Cowboy's Friend
- Fred Church
- Harry Todd
- Brinsley Shaw
- Victor Potel

== Production ==
In the book Father Goose, a passage notes that Ince was allowed to lease an 8,000 acre ranch "on the shores of the Pacific beyond Santa Monica". The land became known as Inceville and became a famous production site. Across the Plains was the first of the Bison Company at the Miller Brothers 101 Ranch. The film had an approximate length of 990 feet and was released on April 1, 1911. The film was released under the Essany label.

A musical accompaniment of the film was preserved in a comment by an unidentified columnist titled "Our Western Correspondent" that stated, "I was in one of the theaters here the other evening and witnessed the Essanay reel, "Across the Plains," and the scene in the cabin where the man and woman are pumping bullets into the Indians making an attack on the place was beautifully illustrated by the genius at the piano, who thumped out "Every Little Bit Added to What You've Got, Makes Just a Little Bit More..." This song was composed by William and Laurence Dillon.

== Reception ==
A review in The Nickelodeon stated, "Here is a dramatic photoplay of the old West which has in it a thrill and sensational race between a prairie schooner, driven by a lone girl, and a band of hostile Indians — a picture that will thrill." The dramatic nature of the fictional picture was noted to those who take films as a depiction of actuality and those within the realm of plausibility. The Moving Picture World noted this in its review of the film by stating, "A question will be raised upon seeing this film — whether it is quite the thing to accept the fact as here set forth that a girl driving a prairie schooner can hold her against Indians on horseback. If the photoplay is looked upon as an accurate description of life of course this scene must be considered too unreal to be included. If, however, the story of the picture is to be considered as the principal feature, then this incident assists in holding interest. It must be admitted that the average audience will enjoy the thrill which this scene affords without analyzing the possibilities of it too closely. The fight at the shack is not improbable. In fact, the same thing has been done a good many times before, while the appearance of the ranchmen and the beating off of the Indians are but incidents which have been many times repeated. That an audience will be pleased with this picture is certain. The improbability of the thrilling race in the first scenes will not mar the enjoyment of the story excepting in a few people." Newspaper ads and critical reviews of the film were scant with known ads in The Daily Missoulian from Missoula, Montana and The Daily News from Mount Carmel, Pennsylvania.

The film's status is unknown, but it is presumably among the 90% of all American silent films that are lost.
