= Devil Dog Dawson =

1921 film

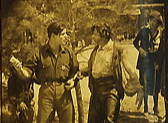
- Still of a scene from Devil Dog Dawson
- Directed by: Karl R. Coolidge
- Produced by: Ben F. Wilson
- Starring: Jack Hoxie; Helene Rosson; Evelyn Selbie; Wilbur McCaugh; Arthur Mackley
- Production company: Unity Photoplays
- Distributed by: Arrow Film Corporation
- Release date: May 1921
- Running time: 5 reels
- Country: United States
- Languages: Silent; English intertitles

Devil Dog Dawson is a 1921 American silent Western film directed by Karl R. Coolidge and starring Jack Hoxie, Helene Rosson and Evelyn Selbie. It was produced by Unity Photoplays and released on the states-rights market by Arrow Film Corp.

Many remaining scenes from this film were thought to have been cut at the time because they depicted alcohol consumption, which was illegal at the time.

== Plot ==
A group of three settlers in Oregon have their horses stolen by outlaws. Their horses are returned by three cowboys. The cowboys later save the settlers again when they are threatened by farmworkers.

== Cast ==
- Jack Hoxie as Devil-Dog Dawson
- Helene Rosson as Mesquite Kane - his daughter
- Evelyn Selbie as Widow Larsen - bandit's pal
- Wilbur McGaugh as Buddy David - mystery bandit
- Arthur Mackley as Sheriff Kane

== Preservation ==
The film was considered lost. Previously, the only surviving footage from this film—38 seconds' worth—was found in a mislabeled tin by a collector in Ohio. The title marked on the tin was Dangerous Hour – Eddie Polo. The canister and its contents were the subject of an investigation in a 2006 episode of the PBS series History Detectives. The film segment was preserved and restored by the Library of Congress. Another copy has been since located in the French archive Centre national du cinéma et de l'image animée in Fort de Bois-d'Arcy.
