= The Big Adventure (1921 film) =

1921 film

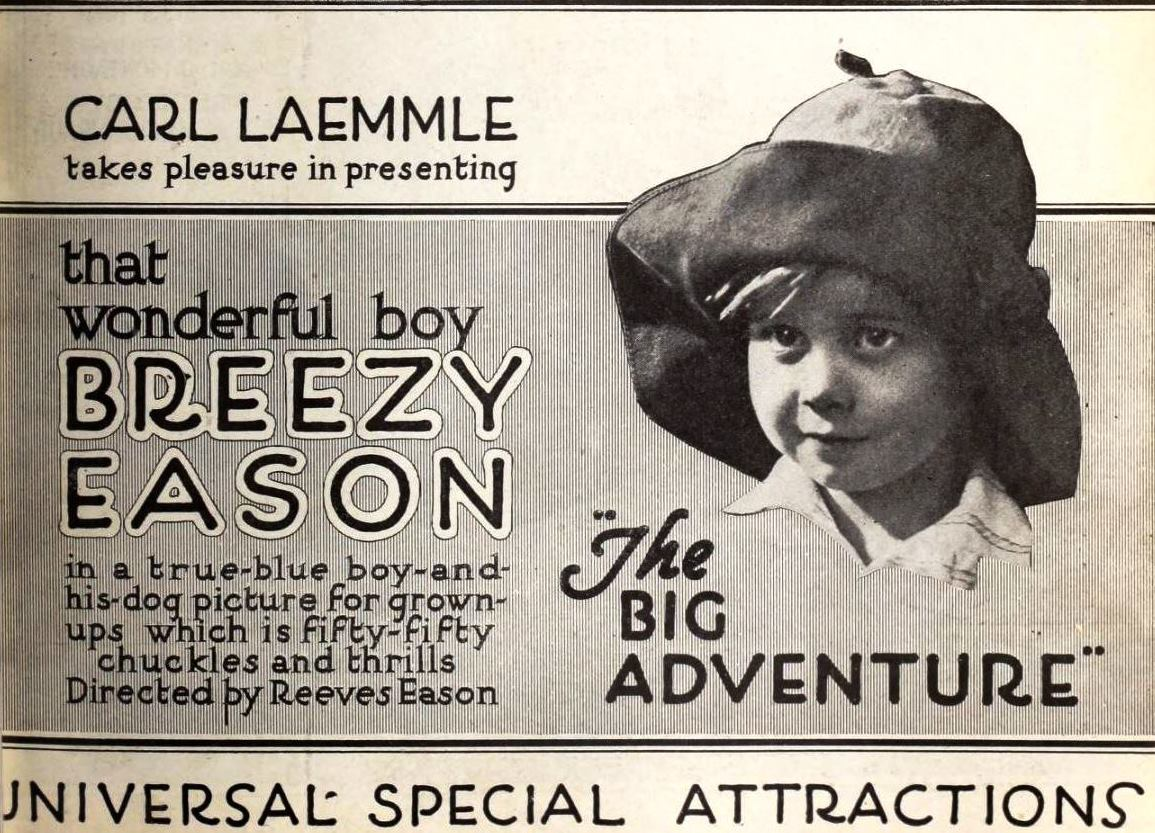
- Directed by: B. Reeves Eason
- Produced by: Carl Laemmle
- Starring: B. Reeves Eason Jr. Lee Shumway; Gertrude Olmstead
- Production company: Universal Pictures
- Distributed by: Universal Pictures
- Release date: April 1921
- Running time: 50 minutes
- Country: United States
- Languages: Silent; English intertitles

The Big Adventure is a 1921 American silent adventure film directed by B. Reeves Eason and starring B. Reeves Eason Jr., Lee Shumway and Gertrude Olmstead.

== Cast ==
- B. Reeves Eason Jr. as Patches
- Fred Herzog as Old Whiskers
- Lee Shumway as John Wellborn
- Molly Shafer as Mrs. Lane
- Gertrude Olmstead as Sally

== Bibliography ==
- Connelly, Robert B. The Silents: Silent Feature Films, 1910-36, Volume 40, Issue 2. December Press, 1998.
- Munden, Kenneth White. The American Film Institute Catalog of Motion Pictures Produced in the United States, Part 1. University of California Press, 1997.
