= The Flyin' Cowboy =

1928 film

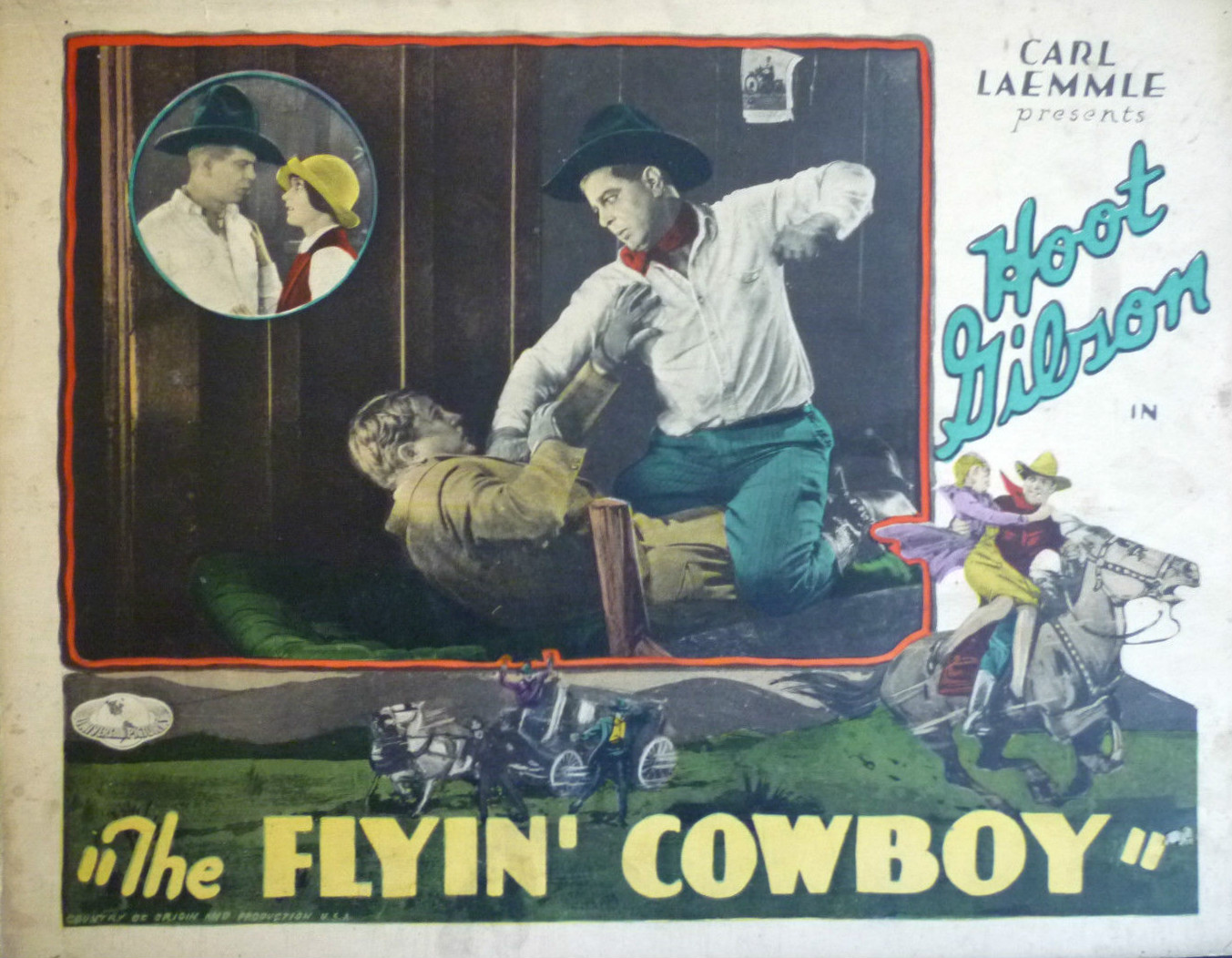
- Lobby card
- Directed by: B. Reeves Eason
- Written by: Arthur Statter
- Based on: story by Arthur Statter
- Produced by: Carl Laemmle
- Starring: Hoot Gibson
- Cinematography: Harry Neumann
- Edited by: Gilmore Walker
- Distributed by: Universal Pictures
- Release date: May 12, 1928
- Running time: 60 minutes
- Country: United States
- Languages: Silent; English intertitles

The Flyin' Cowboy is a lost 1928 American silent Western film directed by B. Reeves Eason and starring Hoot Gibson. It was produced and distributed by Universal Pictures.

== Cast ==
- Hoot Gibson as Bill Hammond
- Olive Hasbrouck as Connie Lamont
- Harry Todd as Tom Gordon
- William Bailey as James Bell
- Buddy Phillips as Chuck Ward
- Ann Carter as Alice Gordon
