= Trigger Tricks =

1930 film by B. Reeves Eason

- Directed by: B. Reeves Eason
- Screenplay by: B. Reeves Eason
- Story by: B. Reeves Eason
- Produced by: Hoot Gibson
- Starring: Hoot Gibson; Sally Eilers; Robert Homans; Jack Richardson; Monte Montague; Neal Hart
- Cinematography: Harry Neumann
- Edited by: Gilmore Walker
- Production company: Universal Pictures
- Distributed by: Universal Pictures
- Release date: June 8, 1930
- Running time: 61 minutes
- Country: United States
- Language: English

Trigger Tricks is a 1930 American pre-Code Western film written and directed by B. Reeves Eason, and starring Hoot Gibson, Sally Eilers, Robert Homans, Jack Richardson, Monte Montague and Neal Hart. It was released on June 8, 1930, by Universal Pictures.

== Plot ==
A cattleman (Gibson) works as a gunman for a group of cattlemen while he tries to find out who killed his brother. Along the way, he falls in love with the owner (Eilers) of a sheep ranch and learns the killer's identity.

== Cast ==
- Hoot Gibson as Texas Ranger Tim Brennan
- Sally Eilers as Betty Dawley
- Robert Homans as Thomas Kingston
- Jack Richardson as Joe Dixon
- Monte Montague as Nick Dalgus
- Neal Hart as Sheriff Jack Thompson
- Max Asher as Ike
- Walter Perry as Mike
