= Sure Fire (disambiguation) =

Sure Fire (or SureFire, Surefire) may refer to:

- Sure Fire, a lost 1921 John Ford film
- SureFire, an American manufacturer of flashlights and associated military equipment
- Surefire (song), on the 2016 John Legend album Darkness and Light
- Surefire: The Best of Econoline Crush, a 2010 compilation album
- Sure Fire (G.I. Joe), in the G.I. Joe action figures line
