= Marie Layet =

American screenwriter

- Born: Marie Tilney Layet; April 3, 1885; Mobile, Alabama, USA
- Died: April 1937 (aged 52); Apalachicola, Florida, USA
- Other names: Marie Stanley
- Occupations: Screenwriter, author
- Spouse: Stanley Sheip

Marie Layet (who often wrote under the pen name Marie Stanley) was an American screenwriter and novelist known for her work during Hollywood's silent era.

== Biography ==
Marie was born in Mobile, Alabama, to George Layet and his wife Josephine Garner. Her parents were reportedly respected and well-known, but she was orphaned at a young age, and was raised primarily by her grandmother. After her grandmother died, she studied art in New Jersey and Ohio.

At the age of 24, she returned to Mobile and opened her own art studio, and she wrote silent films in order to pay her bills after answering an advertisement. Her earliest known effort was on 1913's The Clown's Daughter. She'd go on to write at least a half-dozen more films before marrying prominent lumberman Stanley Sheip in 1917. After her marriage, she turned her attention to the local theater scene, co-founding the Mobile Little Theatre and working on stage plays. Her novel Gulf Stream was published to a mix of acclaim and controversy in 1930.

In 1937, reeling from her publisher rejecting her second novel (Penhazard) and dealing with the effects of long-term alcoholism, she died at her home in Florida. She was survived by her husband; the pair had no children.

== Selected filmography ==
- The Poet of the Peaks (1915)
- Heart of Flame (1915)
- Sir Galahad of Twilight (1914)
- A Soul Astray (1914)
- The Peacock Feather Fan (1914)
- The Mystery of the Yellow Sunbonnet (1914)
- The Clown's Daughter (1913)
