= Navajo (film) =

1952 film

- Theatrical release poster
- Directed by: Norman Foster
- Written by: Norman Foster
- Produced by: Hall Bartlett
- Starring: Hall Bartlett; Francis Kee Teller
- Cinematography: Virgil Miller
- Edited by: Lloyd Nosler
- Music by: Leith Stevens
- Production company: Bartlett Foster Productions
- Distributed by: Lippert Pictures
- Release date: February 12, 1952
- Running time: 70 minutes
- Country: United States
- Language: English

Navajo is a 1952 American fictional drama film directed by Norman Foster. It was nominated for two Academy Awards: for Best Documentary Feature (although it's not a documentary) and Best Cinematography. The Academy Film Archive preserved Navajo in 2012.

It is a story about "Son of the Hunter", a seven-year-old Navajo boy whose father abandoned the family, then his de facto grandfather dies. When he goes to the trading post to get help, he is captured by the authorities and is forced to attend a reservation boarding school. While there, his mother and one of his two sisters die of an undiagnosed malady. He escapes from the school and returns to the wilderness to try to live an independent life.

The Hollywood Foreign Press Association presented 8-year-old actor Francis Kee Teller with an honorary award at the 1953 Golden Globe Awards

The film was restored by Kit Parker Films in 2020 and released on home video for the first time. The release includes a 1952 documentary called Our Navajo Neighbors.

== Cast ==
- Hall Bartlett as Indian School Counselor
- Francis Kee Teller as "Son of the Hunter"
- Sammy Ogg as Narrator
- John Mitchell as Grey Singer (the de facto grandfather of "Son of the Hunter")
- Mrs. Kee Teller as "Good Weaver" (the mother of "Son of the Hunter")
- Eloise Teller and Linda Teller as the sisters of "Son of the Hunter"
