= Theodosia Harris =

American screenwriter

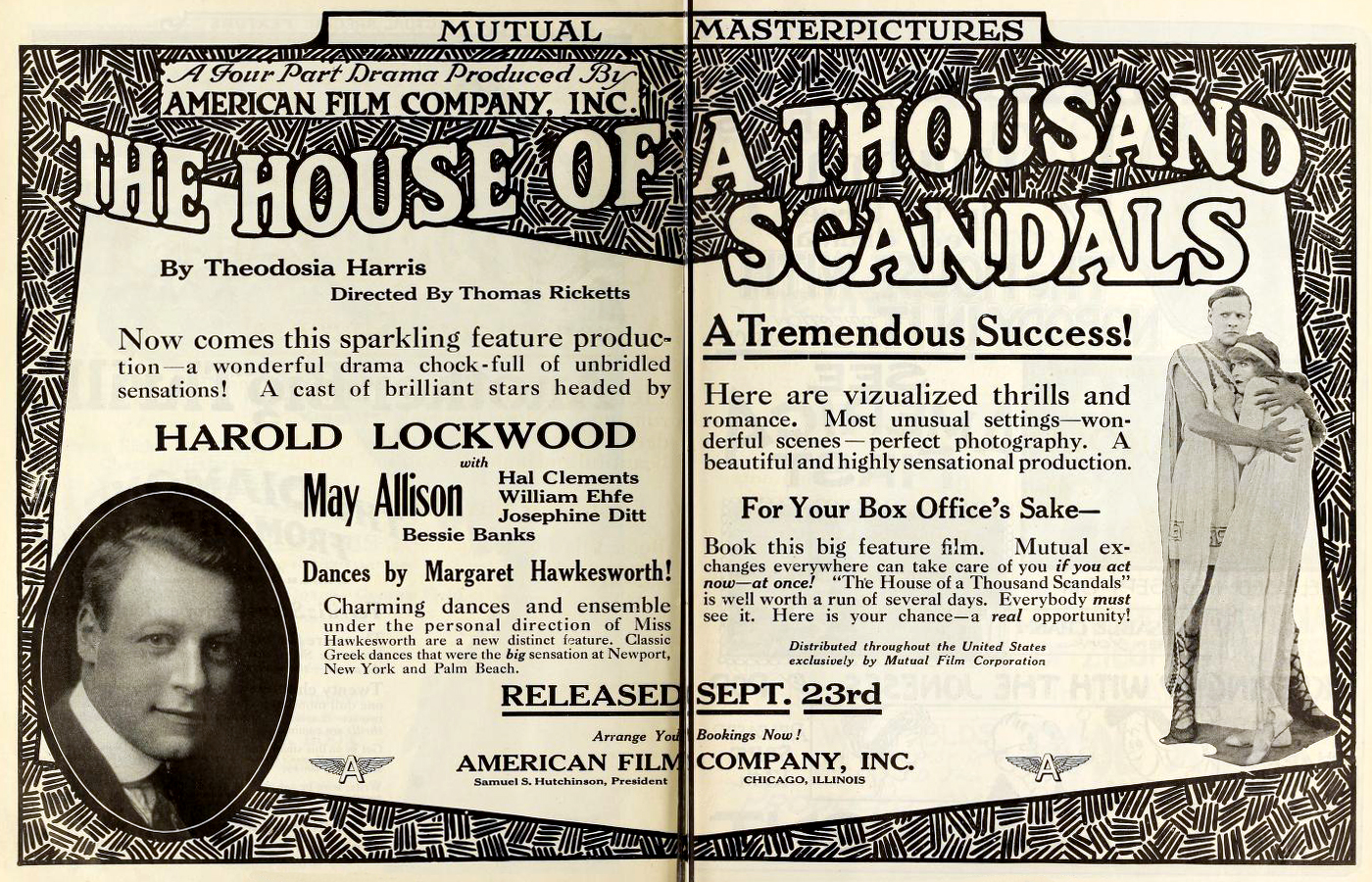
- Born: June 2, 1877; Virginia City, Nevada, USA
- Died: November 22, 1938 (aged 61); San Antonio, Texas, USA
- Occupation: Screenwriter
- Years active: 1913–1916
- Spouse: James Knowles

Theodosia Harris (1877–1938) was an American screenwriter active at the dawn of Hollywood's silent era. She worked as the chief scenario writer at Mutual for director David Horsley in the 1910s, penning dozens of short scenarios she was credited for (and probably many others she wasn't named on). She appears to have retired from screenwriting after marrying San Francisco businessman James Knowles in 1915. She was involved in a 1917 Supreme Court lawsuit over her scenario The House of a Thousand Scandals, and she was never credited on another film after that. She died in San Antonio, Texas, in 1938.

== Selected filmography ==
- The Trap (1916)
- The Leopard's Bride (1916)
- The Hidden Law (1916)
- The Heart of Tara (1916)
- The Soul's Cycle (1916)
- Marta of the Jungles (1915)
- The Terror of the Fold (1915)
- The Arab's Vengeance (1915)
- Martyrs of the Alamo (1915)
- The House of a Thousand Scandals (1915)
- The Day of Reckoning (1915)
- Competition (1915)
- The Echo (1915)
- The Terror of the Fold (1915) (uncredited)
- The Love Pirate (1915)
- Coals of Fire (1915)
- This Is th' Life (1914)
- The Widow (1914)
- Youth and Art (1914)
- The Independence of Susan (1914)
- A Happy Coercion (1914)
- The Lost Treasure (1914)
- Fooling Uncle (1914)
- Fate's Round-Up (1913)
- Spartan Girl of the West (1913)
- Flesh of His Flesh (1913)
- Her Innocent Marriage (1913)
- The Kiss (1913)
- Youth and Jealousy (1913)
