= The Echo (1915 film) =

- Directed by: Tom Ricketts
- Written by: Theodosia Harris
- Starring: Jack Richardson; Vivian Rich; Charlotte Burton; B. Reeves Eason
- Distributed by: Mutual Film
- Release date: March 10, 1915
- Country: United States
- Languages: Silent film English intertitles

The Echo is a 1915 American silent short romantic drama directed by Tom Ricketts. The film stars Jack Richardson, Vivian Rich, Charlotte Burton, B. Reeves Eason, Perry Banks, Louise Lester, David Lythgoe, and Harry von Meter.

== Cast ==
- Jack Richardson as Mr. Wellborn
- Vivian Rich as Violet Wellborn, His Daughter
- Byron Thornberg as John Grant, Aged 12
- David Lythgoe as John Grant
- Perry Banks as Mr. Grant
- Louise Lester as Mrs. Grant
- Harry von Meter as Count de Brasse
- B. Reeves Eason as Ferryman
