= To Melody a Soul Responds =

1915 film

- Directed by: B. Reeves Eason
- Produced by: American Film Manufacturing Company
- Starring: Ashton Dearholt
- Distributed by: Mutual Film
- Release date: July 14, 1915
- Country: United States
- Languages: Silent; English intertitles

To Melody a Soul Responds is a 1915 short film produced by American Film Manufacturing Company, released by Mutual Film and directed by B. Reeves Eason.

== Cast ==
- Ashton Dearholt as Edler
- Joseph Galbraith as Krieg, the Master Violinist
- Jack Richardson as Dehof, a pianist
- Vivian Rich as Elsa Krieg, the daughter
- William Spencer
