= The Poet of the Peaks =

1915 film

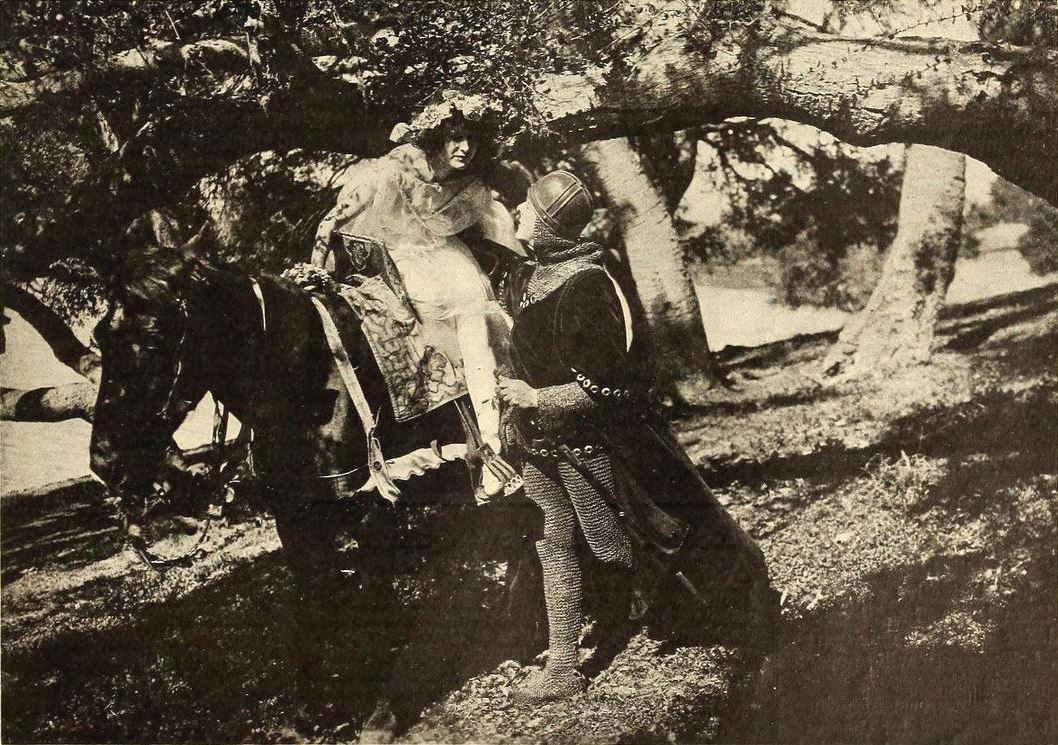
- Film still with Vivian Rich and David Lythgoe
- Directed by: B. Reeves Eason
- Written by: Marie Layet
- Starring: Vivian Rich
- Production company: American Film Manufacturing Co.
- Distributed by: Mutual Film
- Release date: April 28, 1915
- Running time: 2 reels
- Country: United States
- Languages: Silent; English intertitles

The Poet of the Peaks is a 1915 American short drama film directed by B. Reeves Eason. The film is based upon the John Keats poem "La Belle Dame sans Merci".

== Plot ==
According to a film magazine, "Lydia Lovell, a heartless society butterfly, is a guest at Philip Granger's shooting lodge. She discovers that at the top of the trail in a lone cabin lives "the poet of the peaks," Dane Strong, and instantly makes up her mind she will ensnare him. Though Granger remonstrates with her, she carries out her scheme. On returning to the city, Lydia writes Strong to come to her. Completely fascinated, he eagerly obeys. But in the city he cannot write. When he begs Lydia to return with him to the wilderness she laughs aloud at the thought of her becoming the wife of a poor mountaineer. That evening leaving Lydia's house, Strong meets Granger, who takes his dejected friend home with him. He determines to tell the poet the story of the beautiful Lydia's past. The tale reads very much like the history of Sapho, and the young lover, in an agony of doubt, returns that night to learn the truth. As he comes near Lydia's home he hears her through the open window amusing two men callers with a lively description of her affair with Strong. The poet returns to the mountains. He is haunted by Lydia. At last the phantom leads him, in a crazed condition, over the edge of the cliff to his death."

== Cast ==
- Louise Lester as Mrs. Davis
- David Lythgoe as Dane Strong
- Jack Richardson as Martingay
- Vivian Rich as Lydia Lovell
- Harry von Meter as Philip Granger
