= Time and Tide (1916 film) =

1916 film

- Directed by: B. Reeves Eason
- Starring: Hugh Bennett
- Distributed by: Mutual Film
- Release date: January 7, 1916
- Country: United States
- Language: Silent with English intertitles

Time and Tide is a 1916 American short drama film directed by B. Reeves Eason.

== Cast ==
- Hugh Bennett: William Lang
- Nell Franzen: Ruth Walters
- Gayne Whitman (as Alfred Vosburgh): Ned Lang
