= B. Reeves Eason Jr. =

American actor

- Born: Barnes Reeves Eason; November 19, 1914; Los Angeles, California
- Died: October 25, 1921 (aged 6); Hollywood, California
- Other names: Master Breezy Reeves Jr. Universal's Littlest Cowboy; Breezy Eason Jr.
- Occupation: Actor
- Years active: 1916–1921

Barnes Reeves Eason (November 19, 1914 – October 25, 1921), better known by his screen name B. Reeves Eason Jr. was an American silent film child actor. Billed as "Master Breezy Reeves Jr." and "Universal's Littlest Cowboy", and later also known as Breezy Eason Jr., he was the son of motion picture director and actor B. Reeves Eason and his wife, the actress Jimsy Maye.

== Death ==
Eason was killed after being hit by a truck outside of his parents' house after running into the street chasing after a ball shortly after the filming of the Harry Carey silent western The Fox (1921) had been completed. He was interred at Hollywood Forever Cemetery and was one of the first actors to be buried there.

== Filmography ==
- Gold and the Woman (1916)
- Nine-Tenths of the Law (1918)
- The Kid and the Cowboy (1919)
- The Thunderbolt (1919)
- Two Kinds of Love (1920)
- Pink Tights (1920)
- The Lone Ranger (1920)
- Blue Streak McCoy (1920)
- His Nose in the Book (1920)
- Sure Fire (1921)
- The Fox (1921)
- The Big Adventure (1921)

== See also ==
- Paul Kelly
- Bobby Connelly
- Jackie Coogan

== Bibliography ==
- Holmstrom, John. The Moving Picture Boy: An International Encyclopaedia from 1895 to 1995, Norwich, Michael Russell, 1996, pp. 67–68.
