= Kingdom Come (1919 film) =

1919 film

- Directed by: George Holt
- Written by: Karl R. Coolidge; Dorothy Rockfort
- Starring: Hoot Gibson
- Release date: June 21, 1919
- Running time: 20 minutes
- Country: United States
- Languages: Silent; English intertitles

Kingdom Come is a 1919 American short silent Western film directed by George Holt and featuring Hoot Gibson.

== Cast ==
- Pete Morrison
- Hoot Gibson
- Josie Sedgwick
