= At the Edge of Things =

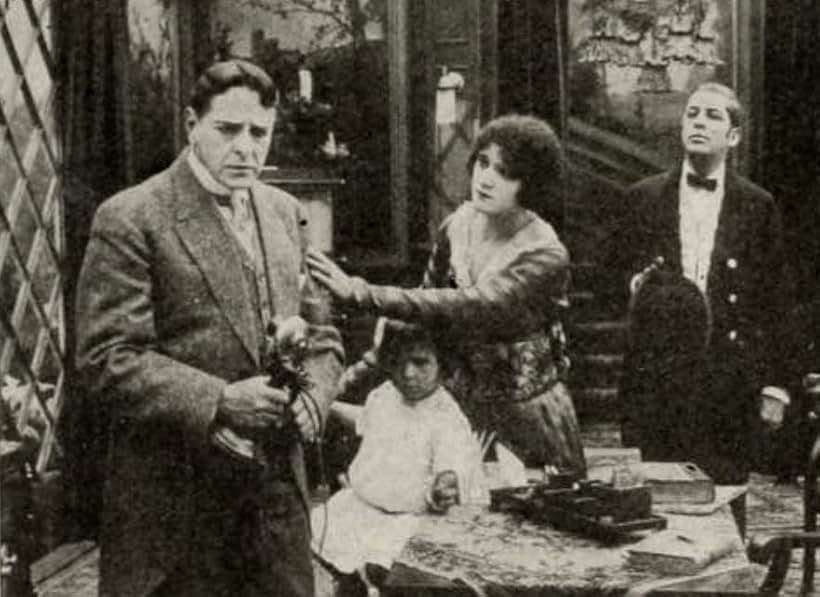
- Starring: Jack Richardson; Louise Lester; Vivian Rich; Harry von Meter; David Lythgoe
- Production company: American Film Manufacturing Company
- Distributed by: Mutual Film
- Release date: May 19, 1915
- Running time: 1 reel
- Country: United States
- Languages: Silent film English intertitles

At the Edge of Things is a 1915 American silent short drama film starring Jack Richardson, Louise Lester, Vivian Rich, Harry von Meter and David Lythgoe.

== Plot ==
According to a film trade magazine, "A sudden drop in the price of a popular copper stock threatens ruin, financially, to Tom Carter, who has invested his life savings in margins, and if the market drops another point he will be a ruined man. Mrs. Carter learns of her husband's predicament and decides to appeal to her father. As her father had recently written her that he would not give her any money to be squandered in gambling, she decides to see him In person. Leaving a note to her husband explaining her absence, she starts on her journey. Later Carter finds the letter from her father, In place of the one left in explanation of her departure and, already in the depth of despair, thinks that his wife has left him in his hour of need. Despondent, he plans suicide.

In the meantime Hawkins, his butler, has also invested his all in the same stock. In his own apartments the butler also decides to end it all, but at the last moment remembers that there is enough money in his master's safe to save his small investment, although not enough to be any use to Carter. Having finished a farewell note. Carter is about to commit suicide when the burglar-butler seizes him. After binding and gagging his master, the butler ties him to a chair, rifles the safe and leaves. During one whole day Carter is helpless in the library while the stock he invested in recovers and mounts higher and higher until his investment is a fortune.

The butler, unable to withhold the good news, hurries to his master's house, and, feigning surprise and regret, unbinds his master, telling him his good fortune. When her father refuses her request for money, Mrs. Carter hurries home, preferring to face poverty with her husband than to accept her parent's offer of a home. She enters the house just as her husband has found her misplaced note of which nothing is said by the happy husband. Carter again becomes master and Hawkins, although there seems to be a knowledge between them of the doings on the eventful day, sees to it that the facts are never mentioned, and the Carter home resumes its place in the world of happiness."

== Cast ==
- David Lythgoe as Tom Carter
- Vivian Rich as Mrs. Carter
- Jack Richardson as Hawkins
- Louise Lester as Mrs. Hawkins
- Jimsey Maye as Helen Morely
