= She Never Knew =

- Directed by: Tom Ricketts
- Starring: Charlotte Burton; William Garwood
- Distributed by: Mutual Film
- Release date: February 24, 1915
- Country: United States
- Languages: Silent film English intertitles

She Never Knew is a 1915 American silent short drama film directed by Tom Ricketts. Starring William Garwood in the lead role with Charlotte Burton.

== Cast ==
- Charlotte Burton
- William Garwood
- Louise Lester
- David Lythgoe
- Jack Richardson
- Vivian Rich
- Harry Van Meter
