= Matching Dreams =

1916 film

- Directed by: B. Reeves Eason
- Starring: Sylvia Ashton
- Production company: American Film Manufacturing Company
- Distributed by: Mutual Film
- Release date: January 3, 1916
- Country: United States
- Languages: Silent; English intertitles

Matching Dreams is a 1916 American short comedy film produced by the American Film Manufacturing Company, released by Mutual Film and directed by B. Reeves Eason.

== Cast ==
- Sylvia Ashton
- Jimsy Maye
- Vivian Rich
- Gayne Whitman (as Alfred Vosburgh)
