= In the Heart of the Woods =

- Directed by: Tom Ricketts
- Written by: Marion Heffernan
- Starring: Louise Lester; Vivian Rich; Harry von Meter; David Lythgoe; Charles Morrison
- Distributed by: Mutual Film
- Release date: March 24, 1915
- Country: United States
- Languages: Silent film English intertitles

In the Heart of the Woods is a 1915 American silent short drama film directed by Tom Ricketts and written by Marion Heffernan. Starring Louise Lester, Vivian Rich, Harry von Meter, David Lythgoe and Charles Morrison.

== Cast ==
- Louise Lester as Miriam Stern
- David Lythgoe as Jack Daley
- Vivian Rich as Nance Morgan
- Harry von Meter as Ben Morgan
- Charles Morrison
