= The Crow (1919 film) =

1919 film

- Directed by: B. Reeves Eason
- Written by: Karl R. Coolidge; Neal Hart; Alan James
- Starring: Hoot Gibson
- Distributed by: Universal Film Manufacturing Company
- Release date: September 15, 1919
- Running time: 20 minutes
- Country: United States
- Languages: Silent; English intertitles

The Crow is a 1919 American short silent Western film directed by B. Reeves Eason and starring Hoot Gibson.

== Plot ==
According to a film magazine, "Tim McKenzie is making for home, the sheriff following close behind. His wife has just received a letter from her father telling her that her husband is an outlaw and advising her to come home. Tim avoids the sheriff, and reaches home. His wife tells him of her discovery, and asks him what he thinks of an outlaw as the father of his child. This alters his whole character and he promises his wife that he will be on the square.

The sheriff sees Tim, and gives chase. Tim's horse falls and throws him. The sheriff rides up, but is promptly roped by Tim, who takes his gun, borrows his horse, handcuffs him with his own handcuffs and sends him back home.

Some weeks later Mary's father comes to her and begs her to return. He has been seen by the sheriff, who has followed and, listening outside the window, discovers that this is the home of Tim, the outlaw. Mary refuses to return with her father.

The sheriff has taken a fancy to Mary and begs her to give up Tim and come with him. Mary's baby is born, and she anxiously awaits the return of Tim. She still refuses the sheriff and orders him from the house. Enraged, he seizes her in his arms, then drops her suddenly at the cry of "Hands up!" and turns to face Tim, who is standing at the door. Tim tells the sheriff: "A year ago I would have shot you, but I have killed my last man." He disarms the sheriff and sends him on his way. Mary takes him and shows him the baby."

== Cast ==
- Hoot Gibson as Tim McKenzie, the Crow
- Arthur Mackley as The Sheriff
- Mildred Moore as His Wife, Mary
- Charles Newton as Mary's Father

== Production ==
The Crow both began and completed shooting in August, 1919.

== See also ==
- List of American films of 1919
