= Riding for Fame =

1928 film

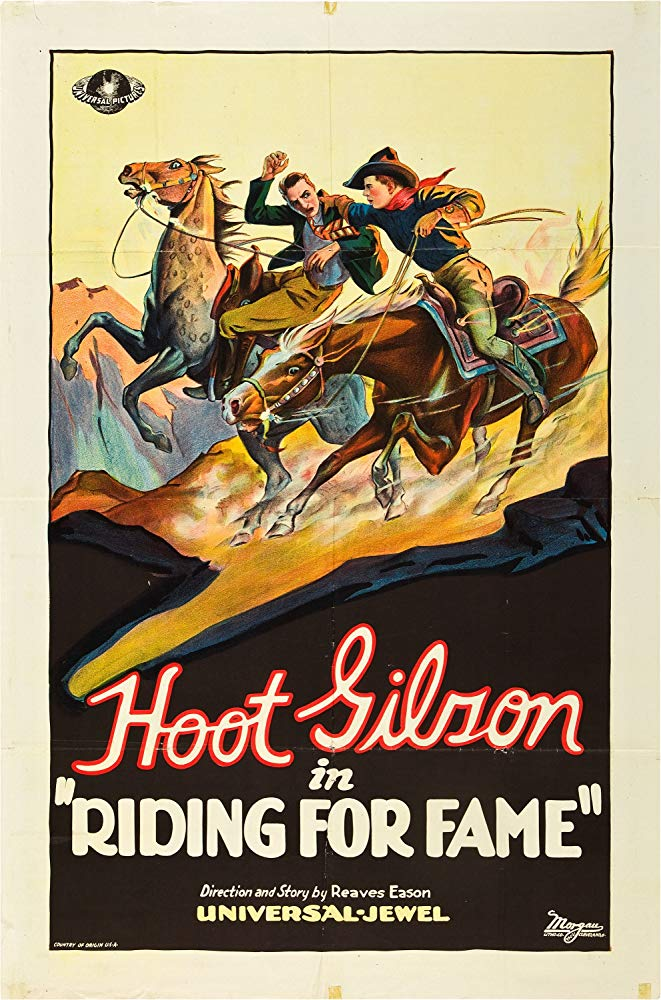
- Directed by: B. Reeves Eason
- Written by: B. Reeves Eason; Slim Summerville; Harold Tarshis(intertitles)
- Based on: a screen story by Arthur Statter
- Produced by: Carl Laemmle
- Starring: Hoot Gibson; Ethlyne Clair
- Cinematography: Harry Neumann
- Edited by: Gilmore Walker
- Distributed by: Universal Pictures
- Release date: August 19, 1928
- Running time: 1 hour
- Country: United States
- Languages: Silent; English intertitles

Riding for Fame is a lost 1928 American silent Western film directed by B. Reeves Eason and starring Hoot Gibson. It was produced and distributed by Universal Pictures.

== Cast ==
- Hoot Gibson as Scratch 'Em Hank Scott
- Ethlyne Clair as Kitty Barton
- Charles K. French as Dad Barton
- Slim Summerville as High-Pockets (as George Summerville)
- Allan Forrest as Donald Morgan
- Ruth Cherrington as Miss Hemingway
- Chet Ryan
- Bob Burns (as Robert Burns)
