= Nine-Tenths of the Law =

1918 film

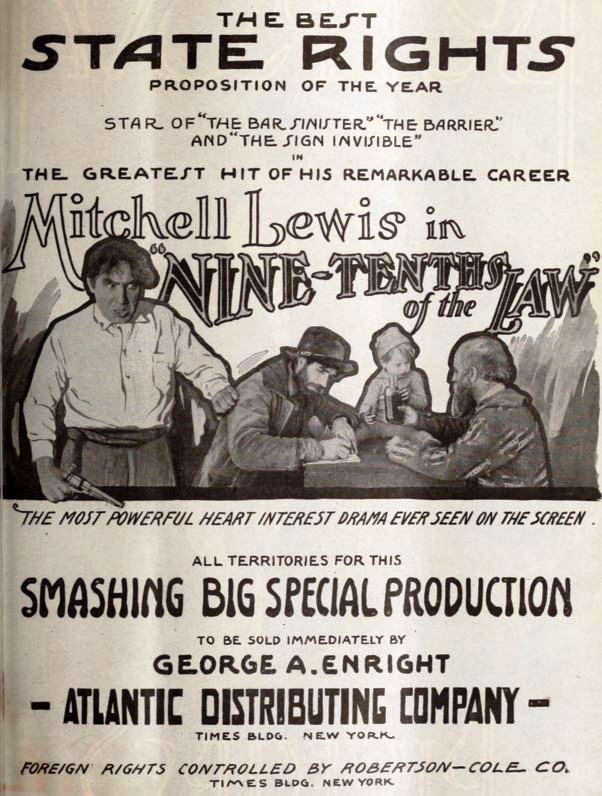
- Advertisement for film
- Directed by: B. Reeves Eason
- Written by: B. Reeves Eason
- Starring: Mitchell Lewis
- Production company: North Woods Producing Company / Balboa Amusement Producing Company
- Distributed by: Atlantic Distributing Corporation
- Release date: May 1918
- Running time: 6 reels
- Country: United States
- Language: Silent (English intertitles)

Nine-Tenths of the Law is a 1918 American silent drama film directed by B. Reeves Eason.

== Plot ==
As described in a film magazine, Jules Leneau and his wife Jane, living in a cabin in the Northwoods, are inconsolable after the death of their infant son. Through the wicked scheme of Red Adair and his partner, trappers who live below the Leneaus, a child from the city is kidnapped and brought to the woods. The child wanders away and falls into a bear trap set by Jules, who discovers him there. The child is adopted by Jules and his wife and, because of her joy, he does not try to discover where the child is from. Red Adair makes several attempts to recover the child, and as a result Jules learns where the child belongs, and resolves to give him up despite Jane's pleadings. She is about to cast herself from a cliff when the story is brought to a happy and unexpected ending.

== Cast ==
- Mitchell Lewis as Jules Leneau
- Jimsy Maye as Jane Leneau
- B. Reeves Eason as 'Red' Adair (credited as Reeves Eason)
- B. Reeves Eason Jr. as Little Roughneck (credited as Breezy Reeves)
- Julius Frankenburg as Pappineau
- Molly Shafer as Nurse
