= The Honor of the District Attorney =

1915 film by B. Reeves Eason

- Directed by: Reaves Eason
- Written by: Reaves Eason
- Starring: Vivian Rich; Louise Lester
- Distributed by: Mutual Film
- Release date: July 19, 1915
- Running time: 2 reels (approximately 20 minutes)
- Country: United States
- Languages: Silent; English intertitles

The Honor of the District Attorney is a 1915 American silent short film directed by Reaves Eason.

== Plot ==
The film follows a district attorney who is forced to choose between attending his daughter's wedding or completing an important trial.

== Cast ==
- Vivian Rich as Dora Mortimer
- Louise Lester as Nora Mortimer - Dora's Mother
- Josephine Ditt as Mrs. Dean Mortimer
- William Spencer as Philip Storey
- Harry Van Meter as John Mortimer - Dora's Father
- Jack Richardson as Ben Morgan

== See also ==
- List of American films of 1915
