= William Spencer (silent film actor) =

American actor

William J. Spencer
- Occupation: Film actor

William J. Spencer was an American silent film actor. Spencer starred in 14 films between 1915 and 1921.

He starred in films such as The Twinkler in 1916.

== Filmography ==
- The Legend of the Poisoned Pool (1915) (as William J. Spencer)
- The Honor of the District Attorney (1915)
- To Melody a Soul Responds (1915)
- The Twinkler (1916)
- The Return of James Jerome (1916) (as William J. Spencer)
- A Sister to Cain (1916) (as W.J. Spencer)
- The Gulf Between (1916/I) (as W.J. Spencer)
- The Redemption of Helene (1916) (as William J. Spencer)
- A Reformation Delayed (1916) (as William J. Spencer)
- Two News Items (1916)
- The Law's Injustice (1916) (as William J. Spencer)
- The Lost Bracelet (1916) (as William J. Spencer)
- Peggy Leads the Way (1917) Pop Hicks
- High Gear Jeffrey (1921)
