= A Sanitarium Scramble =

1916 film

- Directed by: B. Reeves Eason
- Starring: Sylvia Ashton
- Production company: American Film Manufacturing Company
- Distributed by: Mutual Film
- Release date: January 28, 1916
- Running time: 1 reel
- Country: United States
- Language: Silent with English intertitles

A Sanitarium Scramble is a 1916 American silent short comedy film produced by the American Film Manufacturing Company, released by Mutual Film and directed by B. Reeves Eason.

== Plot ==
According to a film magazine, "Aunt Penelope always has aspired to be a Red Cross nurse. Realizing that her dream never can be fulfilled, she fondly hopes to make a nurse of her pretty niece, Janice James. Janice obediently goes to the training school. Succoring Frank, an unfortunate youth who has burned his finger while gazing too long in her direction, a romance buds in Janice’s young life. One night she and her patient linger too late on the wrong side of the hospital gates. They are discovered by the head nurse, and Janice is dismissed. Nothing daunted, she invites her friends to a house-warming in her new apartment. In the midst of the party Aunt Penelope is announced.

Janice bundles the boys into bed, and dresses the girls in nurses’ caps and aprons. When the aunt confronts her niece with charges of dismissal, Janice explains that she has opened a private sanitarium. At once Aunt Pen is all sympathy. She insists on doing her share of the nursing. Col. Austin Austins, a Southern gentleman in reduced circumstances traces his friend, Frank, to the apartment, looking for a loan. He is persuaded to impersonate “an eminent surgeon and heart specialist.” Janice explains to him the situation, and the Colonel gallantly offers to take Aunt Pen out to dinner. Difficulties ensue when he fails to find the price of the meal. Frank, however, comes to the rescue. Later, the joke is exploded. But the colonel calms the wrath of Aunt Pen with the announcement that though he may not be a great surgeon, he certainly can carve a duck."

== Cast ==
- Sylvia Ashton as Aunt Penelope
- Hugh Bennett as Col. Austin-Austins
- Vivian Rich as Janice James
- Gayne Whitman as Frank Fellows (as Alfred Vosburgh)
