= The Day of Reckoning (film) =

1915 film

- Vivian Rich, Louise Lester, and David Lythgoe
- Directed by: B. Reeves Eason
- Written by: Theodosia Harris
- Starring: Vivian Rich; David Lythgoe; Louise Lester
- Production company: American Film Manufacturing Company
- Distributed by: Mutual Film
- Release date: April 19, 1915
- Running time: 2 reels
- Country: United States
- Languages: Silent; English intertitles

The Day of Reckoning is a 1915 American silent short drama film produced by the American Film Manufacturing Company, released by Mutual Film and directed by B. Reeves Eason. It stars Vivian Rich and David Lythgoe.

== Plot ==
According to a film magazine, "Deceived by Carl Burton, to whom she supposed she was legally married, Martha True is left to bear her disgrace alone. When her child is born she is obliged to entrust it to the care of a Mrs. Crew in order that she may work to support the baby. Under the strain of long hours behind the counter and sorrow at being separated from her child, Martha is overcome in the store. She is taken to a hospital by her employer, a big-hearted bachelor, who visits her daily and eventually falls in love with her. When, knowing nothing of her past, John Walton proposes marriage, Martha yields to a great temptation. They are married. Not long after, a letter comes from Mrs. Crew. Martha herself has instructed her friend to write it, as though on her dying bed, imploring Martha to take her child. Walton is delighted with the idea of having a child in the house and Martha sends for her baby. Meanwhile, Burton gets wind of what has happened. He sends Rita Marr, an adventuress, with a letter threatening to expose Martha, unless she will share her property with the blackmailers. Fearing lest her husband discover everything, the wife takes her child and is on the point of leaving the house, when Walton returns. When he learns the whole story Walton finds that his love for his wife and her child is more to him than anything else in the world."

== Cast ==
- Vivian Rich as Martha True
- David Lythgoe as John Walton
- Louise Lester as Mrs. Crew
- Jack Richardson as Carl Burton
- Charlotte Burton as Rita Marr
