= The Legend Beautiful =

1915 film

- Directed by: Tom Ricketts
- Written by: Clarence J. Harris (Story)
- Based on: Poetry by Henry Wadsworth Longfellow
- Starring: William Garwood; Perry Banks; Jack Richardson
- Distributed by: Mutual Film
- Release date: January 4, 1915
- Country: United States
- Languages: Silent film English intertitles

The Legend Beautiful is a 1915 American silent short drama film directed by Tom Ricketts. It stars William Garwood in the lead role with Perry Banks and Jack Richardson.

== Plot ==
The plot was described in The Moving Picture World:

Jose and Pietro are brothers living on their father's ranch. Both are attracted to Rachel, who loves Jose, but admires Pietro for his enterprise. However, she refuses to marry either of them.

In order to rouse Jose, the local Padre suggests to the boys' aged father that he tell his sons of gold in their neglected fields. However, it is Pietro who applies himself, and in his greed leaves his father to be cared for on his dying bed by Jose.

Rachel at last consents to marry Jose. Pietro, incensed, drugs his brother's wine and induces him to sell his share of their inheritance. The inebriated Jose goes to show Rachel the money. The girl, broken hearted at his rash decision, sends him away.

On coming to himself, Jose is beset with shame and despair, and wanders away from the ranch. Returning a few weeks later, he learns that that his brother has married Rachel. He goes to a certain rock and, putting the gold he has received from Pietro underneath, with a note swearing revenge to the death, he informs his brother that there is one rock he has overlooked. A short time later, Pietro and his bride discover the money, and the note.

Years pass, finding Pietro reduced to poverty and stricken with illness. Jose, now the owner of a gold mine, still thirsts for revenge. Returning to the ranch intending to kill Pietro, he stops at the cottage which was once his home. Exhausted from travel, he falls asleep.

Meanwhile, Leah, the eight-year-old child of Pietro, has been listening to the Padre's story of the Legend Beautiful; of a time when Christ appeared to him. She comes to the cottage with her basket full of bread and lilies and wakens the sleeping stranger. Hearing her recital of the legend, and that she is his brother's child, he is stirred to repentance: falling on his knees in the hut, he beholds a vision of Christ.

Jose hastens to Pietro's home and, clasping his brother in his arms, begs forgiveness. Not long after, Pietro succumbs to his sickness. On the threshold of taking holy orders, Jose learns of his brother's death. He and Rachel at last are united.

== Cast ==
- William Garwood as Jose Cordero
- Perry Banks as Amelio Cordero
- Jack Richardson as Pietro Cordero
- Ed Coxen as The Christ
- Vivian Rich as Rachael
- Reaves Eason as Rachael's father
- Louise Lester as Rachael's mother
- Harry von Meter as A Padre
- Joseph Knight as The Strange Gringo
- Jack O'Brien as Prospector
- Genevieve Arellanes as Leah, Pietro's daughter
- Hugh Bennett as Poor old man
- Harry Edmondson as Blind man
- Grace Knight as Feeble woman
- Arthur Melett as A monk
- William Vaughn as Beggar

== Reception ==
Motography called it a "beautiful film which would be a credit to any director", also praising the scenery and noting the handsome orange-yellow tinting of the film. They also praised the "virile character interpretations", finally calling it a "picture [belonging] to the class which not only satisfies an audience, but also impresses it and leaves with it a memory of grandeur which less artistic films fail to create."
