= After the Storm (1915 film) =

1915 short film directed by B. Reeves Eason

- Vivian Rich and Harry von Meter
- Directed by: B. Reeves Eason
- Starring: Vivian Rich
- Production company: American Film Manufacturing Company
- Distributed by: Mutual Film
- Release date: July 24, 1915
- Running time: 1 reel
- Country: United States
- Languages: Silent; English intertitles

After the Storm is a 1915 American silent short drama film directed by B. Reeves Eason.

== Plot ==
According to an industry trade magazine,

"Rev. Jerold Roper and his baby escapes from a wreck at sea on a frail raft. Crazed by want of food and water, the minister is about to throw himself into the sea. His baby he has placed in a strong bound box. A great wave washes over the raft; the box and the baby are swept away. Weakened as he is, Roper can take no step to save his child. He falls unconscious on the raft. The box floats safely to shore. It is washed on the beach near a point where Jacques and Meg Fortell are gathering wreckage which the waves have strewn on the sands. The baby appeals to Meg's motherly instinct. Much to Jacques' disgust, she insists on keeping the infant girl. Rev. Roper at length is rescued by a passing vessel. Twenty years elapse. The minister and the Fortells are living in the same city. Roper is pastor of a church in the slums where he administers to the poor in an effort to forget his long lost daughter. Meg and Jacques are at the head of a den of thieves. Meg, however despite her own evil ways, has managed to protect her adopted daughter, Jane, from living a life of crime. Jane goes often to Roper's church where she finds a strange tie between herself and the minister. Returning one night from church Jane passes Lloyd Perry, an evil youth, who follows her. His pursuit of Jane leads him to the thieves' den. He is attacked by Jacques. With a revolver he cowers Jacques and Meg. Then a sinister plan enters his brain. Ho demands as his price of silence that Jacques and Meg sacrifice Jane. They agree. They help Lloyd carry the girl to his room. Jane's cries for help are heard by Rev. Roper, who chances to live in the same apartment. The minister flies to the rescue, fights a stubborn battle hand to hand with Jacques, Meg and Perry. He rescues Jane and takes her to his church. The crime-stained trio follows him and they are awed at what they see. There at the altar stand Jane and Roper their arms interlocked in embrace. By a strange birthmark on her arm, Jane's identity is discovered."

== Cast ==
- Vivian Rich as Jane Roper
- Harry von Meter as Rev. Jarold Roper (as Harry Van Meter)
- Walter Spencer as Lloyd Perry
- Jack Richardson as Jacques Fortell
- Louise Lester as Meg Fortell
