= Hair Trigger Stuff =

1920 silent film

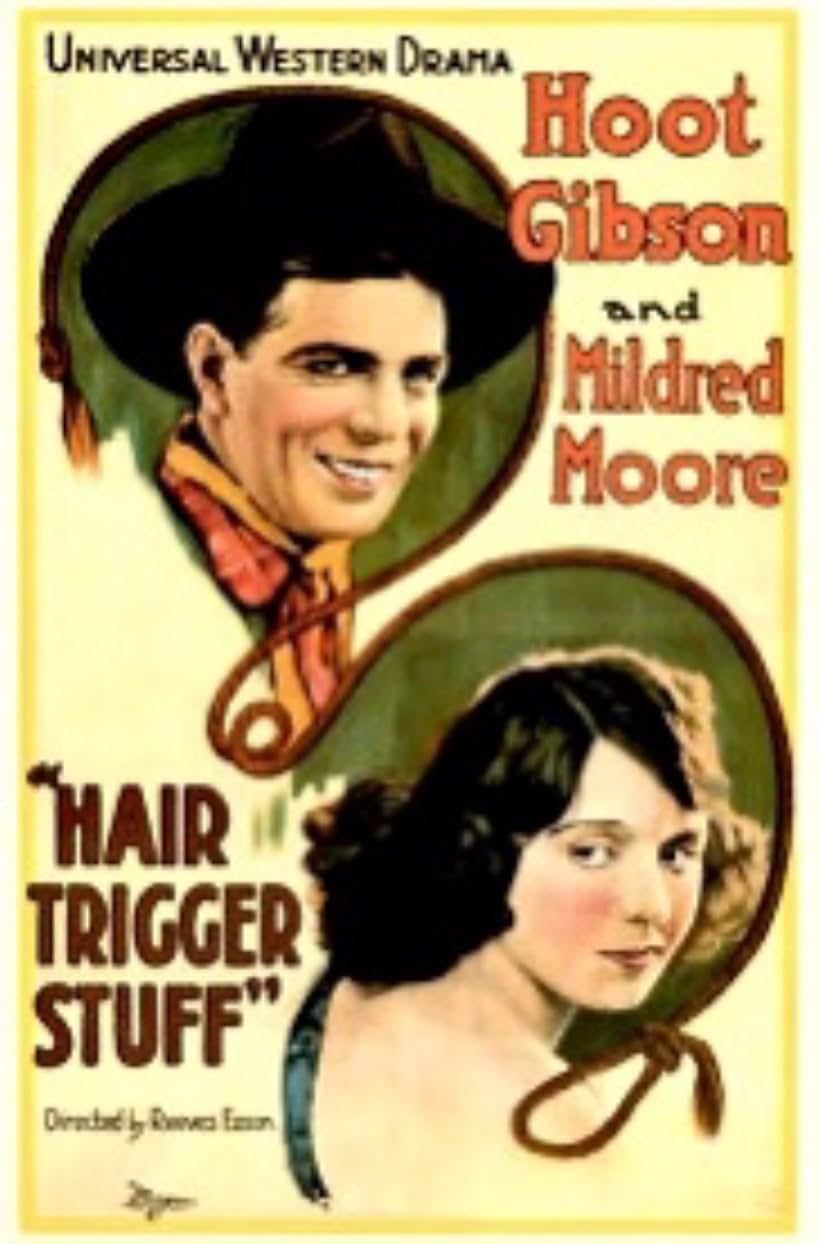
- Directed by: B. Reeves Eason
- Written by: Philip Hubbard; Dorothy Rockfort
- Starring: Hoot Gibson
- Release date: March 5, 1920
- Running time: 20 minutes
- Country: United States
- Languages: Silent; English intertitles

Hair Trigger Stuff is a 1920 American short silent Western film directed by B. Reeves Eason and starring Hoot Gibson.

== Plot ==
According to a film magazine, "Jim Dawson and his wife started their married life with a different viewpoint. Jim trusted nobody — Maisie trusted everybody. By a series of incidents the pendulum was swung the other way and Jim began to be as trusting as Maisie.

Whereupon the very first person who happened along with a hardluck story was taken straight to Jim's heart. But the person in question happened to be one of a gang of bank-thieves and the result of Jim's trust was that he himself was robbed of a thousand dollars and made the goat in a little matter of the escape of one of the bank-robbers from jail. Jim tackled the situation, recaptured the robber and recovered his thousand dollars, but at the last minute he came near being put out of business by a trick of one of the thieves.

To his rescue came Ping, the Chinese cook, whom Jim had turned out of the house on the previous day on an entirely unjust suspicion. So Jim came to the conclusion that trust was a matter of fifty-fifty — trust and judgment."

== Cast ==
- Hoot Gibson as Jim Dawnson
- Mildred Moore as Maisie
- George Field as Buzzard
- Beatrice Dominguez as Jane Goold
- Tote Du Crow as Ping
- Charles Newton as Sheriff
- Andrew Waldron as Deputy

== See also ==
- Hoot Gibson filmography
