= Shootin' for Love =

1923 film directed by Edward Sedgwick

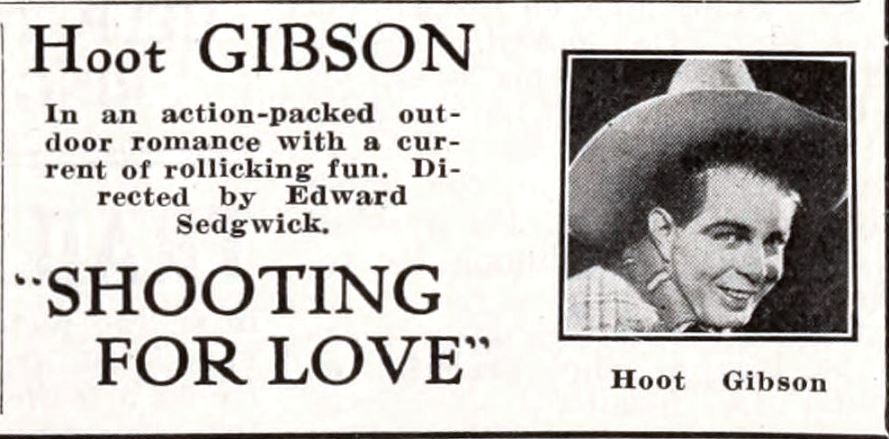
- Advertisement with the title as Shooting for Love
- Directed by: Edward Sedgwick
- Written by: Albert Kenyon; Raymond L. Schrock; Edward Sedgwick
- Starring: Hoot Gibson
- Cinematography: Virgil Miller
- Release date: June 28, 1923
- Running time: 50 minutes
- Country: United States
- Languages: Silent; English intertitles

Shootin' for Love is a 1923 American silent Western film directed by Edward Sedgwick and featuring Hoot Gibson. Gibson plays a World War I veteran suffering from shell shock who at his father's ranch becomes involved in a dispute over water rights that leads to gunfire. The British Board of Film Censors, under its then-current guidelines, banned the film in 1923.

== Cast ==
- Hoot Gibson as Duke Travis
- Laura La Plante as Mary Randolph
- Alfred Allen as Jim Travis
- William Welsh as Bill Randolph
- William Steele as Dan Hobson
- Arthur Mackley as Sheriff Bludsoe
- W.T. McCulley as Sandy
- Kansas Moehring as Tex Carson

== See also ==
- Hoot Gibson filmography
