= Competition (film) =

2015 short film by Ken Daurio

- Directed by: B. Reeves Eason; Tom Ricketts
- Written by: Theodosia Harris
- Starring: Charlotte Burton
- Production company: American Film Manufacturing Company
- Distributed by: Mutual Film
- Release date: March 17, 1915
- Country: United States
- Languages: Silent; English intertitles

Competition is a 1915 short film produced by the American Film Manufacturing Company, released by Mutual Film, directed by B. Reeves Eason and Tom Ricketts and starring Charlotte Burton. It was Eason's directorial debut, and he also acted in it.

== Plot ==
This plot is quoted from Moving Picture World:

Farmer Stubbs does not approve of his daughter at all when she returns from school dressed in the latest fashion. When the most prosperous farmer in Pike County proposes and is rejected he approves much less of her and decides to put her to work.

Jim Daley, a city sweetheart, is on his way to propose to her. He hopes the parents will approve as his raising has made him utterly against elopement. He arrives at an inopportune time and is refused with more dispatch than courtesy. The old man asserts that his daughter will marry a farmer or no one. Things are despondent when a bright idea strikes Jim. He decides to lease the adjacent farm, disguise himself as a farmer and by competition bring not only Dad but Josh to his terms.

After a month or two Jos and Dad offer to buy him out to get rid of him, such inroads has he made into their dairy business. He brings them to his terms and then adds that the consent of the old man to the marriage of Myra will be thrown in. This does not displease the old man so much as he thinks he Is giving her to a prosperous farmer. He is bowled over when his son-in-law discloses his Identity, but he has to accept the situation.

— Theodosia Harris, story and scenario

== Cast ==
- Charlotte Burton
- B. Reeves Eason (as Reaves Eason)
- Jack Richardson
- Vivian Rich
- Harry von Meter (as Harry Van Meter)
