= Sylvia Ashton =

American actress (1880–1940)

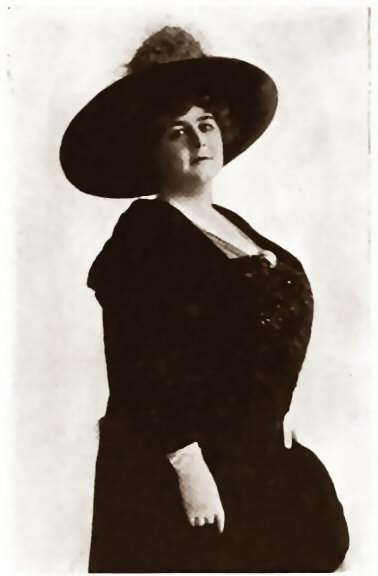
- Who's Who in the Film World, 1914
- Born: January 26, 1880; Denver, Colorado, United States
- Died: November 18, 1940 (aged 60); Los Angeles, California, United States
- Occupation: Actress
- Years active: 1912–1929

Sylvia Ashton (January 26, 1880 – November 18, 1940) was an American film actress of the silent film era.

Ashton was born in Denver, Colorado. She bore a heavyset resemblance to Jane Darwell and like Darwell was playing mother and grandmother roles, though more famously than Darwell in the silents, while still in her 30s and 40s.

In 1912, Ashton was an actress in D.W. Griffith's stock company. After that, she acted for Famous Players–Lasky. For years she was a regular member of Cecil B. DeMille's troupe of character actors. She appeared in more than 130 films between 1912 and 1929. She retired from movies almost immediately at the dawn of sound, one of her later films being the part-sound film The Barker (1928).

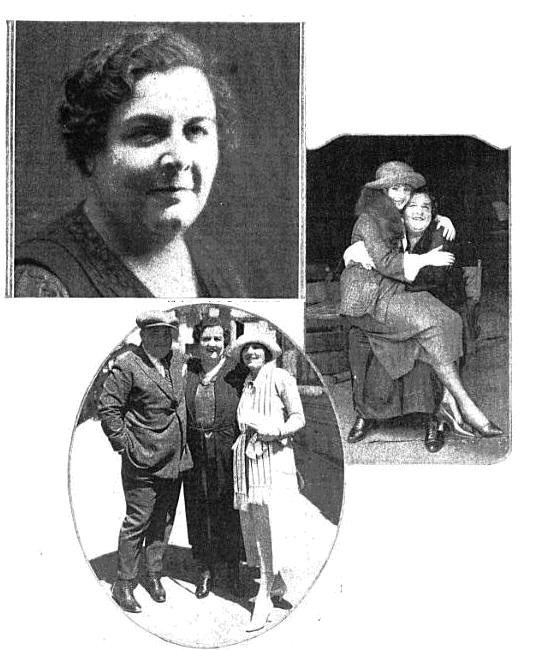
Sylvia Ashton, at right with Betty Compson and below with Walter Hiers and Leatrice Joy. Motion Picture Magazine, August 1922

Ashton died on November 18, 1940, aged 60.

== Partial filmography ==
- The Nick of Time Baby (1916)
- Matching Dreams (1916)
- Viviana (1916)
- A Sanitarium Scramble (1916)
- Haystacks and Steeples (1916)
- Whose Baby? (1917)
- Old Wives for New (1918)
- We Can't Have Everything (1918)
- A Pair of Silk Stockings (1918)
- The Goat (1918)
- Fuss and Feathers (1918)
- Don't Change Your Husband (1919)
- Peggy Does Her Darndest (1919)
- For Better, for Worse (1919)
- Men, Women, and Money (1919)
- Jack Straw (1920)
- Mrs. Temple's Telegram (1920)
- Sweet Lavender (1920)
- Jenny Be Good (1920)
- Why Change Your Wife? (1920)
- Thou Art the Man (1920)
- The Soul of Youth (1920)
- Conrad in Quest of His Youth (1920)
- The Blushing Bride (1921)
- Sham (1921)
- Hold Your Horses (1921)
- Garments of Truth (1921)
- The Snob (1921)
- Saturday Night (1922)
- For the Defense (1922)
- Our Leading Citizen (1922)
- While Satan Sleeps (1922)
- Manslaughter (1922)
- Youth to Youth (1922)
- The White Flower (1923)
- Desire (1923)
- Greed (1924)
- Dancing Days (1926)
- Women's Wares (1927)
- Cheating Cheaters (1927)
- Ladies' Night in a Turkish Bath (1928)
- The Barker (1928)
- The Head Man (1928)
- The Crash (1928)
- Bachelor's Paradise (1928)
- Queen Kelly (1928)
- The Leopard Lady (1928)
