= Virgil Miller =

American cinematographer

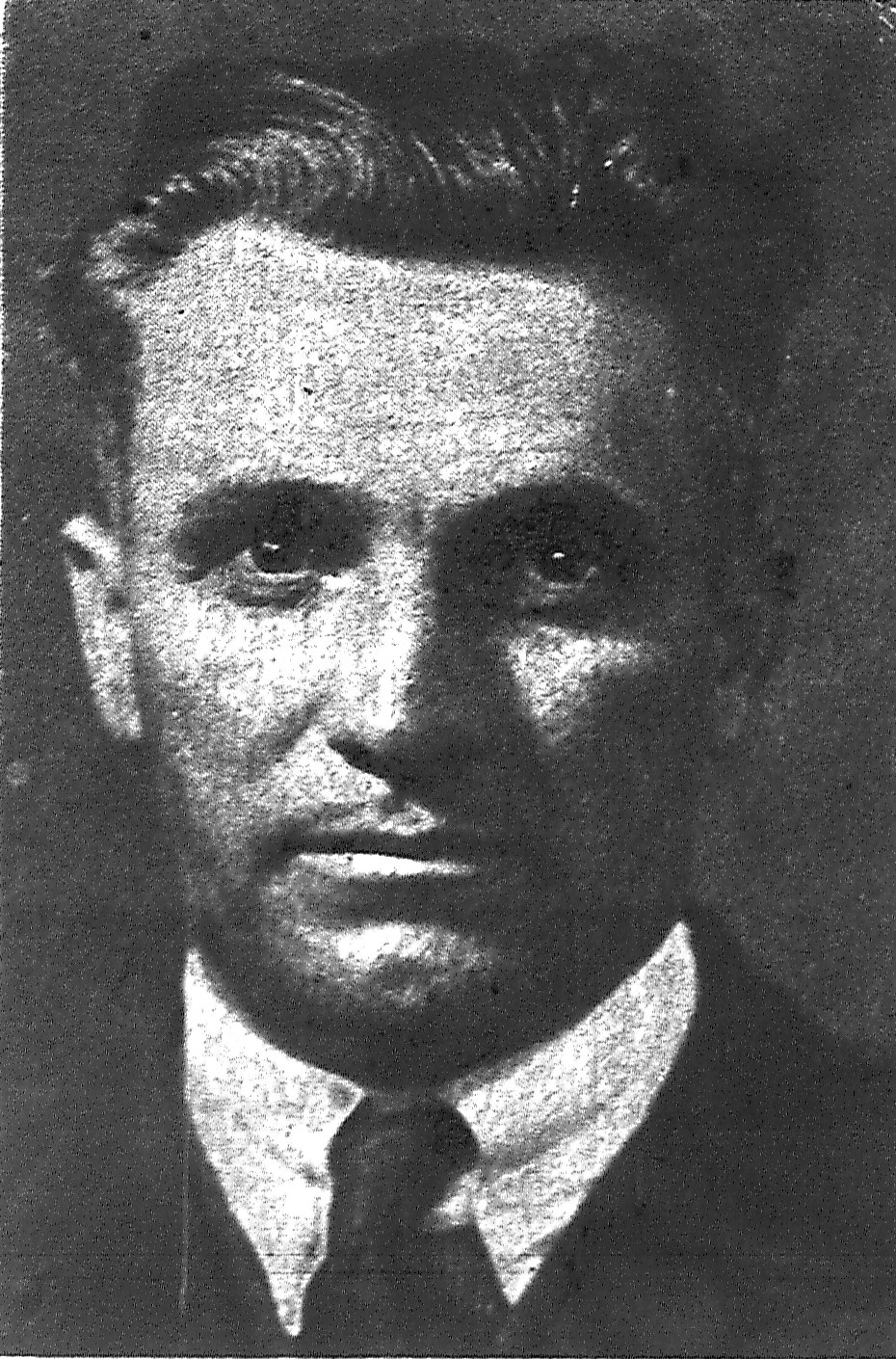
- Miller in 1922
- Born: December 20, 1886; Coffeen, Illinois, U.S.
- Died: October 5, 1974 (aged 87); North Hollywood, California, U.S.
- Burial place: Oakwood Memorial Park
- Occupation: Cinematographer
- Spouse: Myrtle Bower (divorced)
- Children: 5

Virgil Miller (December 20, 1886 – October 5, 1974) was an American cinematographer who was the director of photography for 157 films between 1917 and 1956.

== Career ==
Born in Coffeen, Illinois, Miller's credits include The Phantom of the Opera (1925), Danger - Love at Work (1937), Mr. Moto Takes a Chance (1938), The Mummy's Curse (1944), Navajo (1952), Crazylegs (1953), and six Charlie Chan films.

Miller published his autobiography, Splinters from Hollywood Tripods, in 1964. Prior to working for Universal Studios and, eventually, most other major studios, Miller was a graduate from and a professor at Kansas State University teaching physics and electrical engineering. In 1913, Miller became the first director and founder of the electrical department of Universal Studios. Best known for being one of the first to use electrical lights to film indoors and at night. In 1915, he filmed on location in San Francisco, California, for the World's Fair; one of the earliest "on location" scenes filmed. He also coordinated very early special effects including filming stampedes, explosions, and shrinking people. He was nominated for an Academy Award for Best Cinematography for the documentary film Navajo in 1952.

== Personal life ==
He was first married to Myrtle Bower. Together they had five boys: Joaquin, Wendell, Harlan "Lee", Loren, and Donald. He and Myrtle divorced and Miller later remarried. He died in North Hollywood, California on October 5, 1974, and was buried at Oakwood Memorial Park.

== Partial filmography ==
- A Stormy Knight (1917)
- The Man Trap (1917)
- Brace Up (1918)
- Winner Takes All (1918)
- The Guilt of Silence (1918)
- The Eagle (1918)
- Smashing Through (1918)
- Pink Tights (1920)
- The Silent Barrier (1920)
- Two Kinds of Love (1920)
- Red Courage (1921)
- Luring Lips (1921)
- Colorado (1921)
- Sure Fire (1921)
- Man Under Cover (1922)
- The Scrapper (1922)
- Don't Shoot (1922)
- The Lone Hand (1922)
- The Flame of Life (1923)
- The Gentleman from America (1923)
- Shootin' for Love (1923)
- The Thrill Chaser (1923)
- 40-Horse Hawkins (1924)
- The Saddle Hawk (1925)
- California Straight Ahead (1925)
- Let 'er Buck (1925)
- The Phantom of the Opera (1925)
- Broken Hearts of Hollywood (1926)
- The Runaway Express (1926)
- Private Izzy Murphy (1926)
- Under Western Skies (1926)
- Irish Hearts (1927)
- Finders Keepers (1928)
- Stocks and Blondes (1928)
- Young Whirlwind (1928)
- Alex the Great (1928)
- Two Outlaws (1928)
- The Vagabond Cub (1929)
- The Little Savage (1929)
- The Woman I Love (1929)
- Laughing at Death (1929)
- The Garden of Allah (1936)
- Danger - Love at Work (1937)
- Thank You, Mr. Moto (1937)
- Mr. Moto Takes a Chance (1938)
- Charlie Chan in Reno (1939)
- Charlie Chan at Treasure Island (1939)
- The Man Who Wouldn't Talk (1940)
- Murder Over New York (1940)
- Calling Dr. Death (1943)
- The Mummy's Curse (1944)
- The Falcon in San Francisco (1945)
- The Michigan Kid (1947)
- Navajo (1952)
- Murder Without Tears (1953)
- Crazylegs (1953)
