= The Altar of Ambition =

- Vivian Rich, Jack Richardson, Louise Lester, and Harry von Meter
- Directed by: Archer MacMackin
- Starring: Jack Richardson; Louise Lester; Vivian Rich; Harry von Meter; David Lythgoe
- Production company: American Film Manufacturing Company
- Distributed by: Mutual Film
- Release date: May 10, 1915
- Running time: 2 reels
- Country: United States
- Languages: Silent film English intertitles

The Altar of Ambition is a 1915 American silent short drama film directed by Archer MacMackin starring Jack Richardson, Louise Lester, Vivian Rich, Harry von Meter, and David Lythgoe.

== Plot ==
According to a film trade magazine, "Engrossed in his candidacy for governor, John Farden, neglects his wife and home ties. An important engagement prevents him from accompanying his wife to a musicale [sic], but unwilling to spoil her pleasure, he suggests that she accept the escort of William Morris, a friend.

At the musicale Irene Farden's wife meets Richard Barry, her husband's political enemy. The morning papers announce the candidacy of John Farden against Richard Barry for the governorship, and Barry, fearing the strength of his opponent, plans to injure his chances by involving his wife in a scandal with William Morris, whose I.O.U.'s he holds for gambling debts. Morris, to save his reputation among his fellow-clubmen, reluctantly accepts the politician's plans.

At a lawn fete, Irene, unknowingly becomes involved in a flirtation with Morris and through Mrs Morris, who is also in the plot, the affair becomes common gossip among the guests. When John Firden hears the ugly rumors he refuses to believe them true, but later he discovers his wife out automobiling with Morris and finds a bouquet of roses in the library with that gentleman's card attached. He informs his wife that people are talking about her and begs that she refrain from further meetings with Morris. Irene, however, bent on enjoying her social engagements, continues her association with Morris until one evening Morris plays his last card and tries to kiss her as he bids her goodnight. The scene is witnessed by Farden who denounces them both and refuses to believe his wife's explanation.

Ordered from her home, Irene goes to the home of a friend before the conspirators of a subsidized newspaper publishes an account of the scandal. Missing her mother's attentions, little Helen Farden becomes ill and the distracted father and the two nurses are unable to console her. Irene seeks the seclusion of the country, but is followed by Morris, who In an intoxicated condition, tries to force his attentions on her. In spite of all, Farden is elected governor and a month later as his child grows steadily worse, seeks Morris, hoping to find his wife's address. This information is withheld by Morris and the following day Morris goes to the country club hoping to meet Irene. As Morris orders' a horse the hostler warns him not to ride while intoxicated, but Morris pays no heed and awkwardly rides away. As he approaches Irenes retreat the horse rears and he receives a fall. Servants carry him into the house and, summoning a doctor, he is pronounced unable to live. Before dying he seem retribution and signs a confession, exonerating Irene and tells of the conspiracy to discredit her husband for political purposes. Armed with the confession, Irene returns to her husband and a happy reconciliation is affected at the bedside of their little child."

== Cast ==
- David Lythgoe as John Farden
- Vivian Rich as Irene, his wife
- Harry von Meter as Richard Barry
- Jack Richardson as William Morris
- Louise Lester as Mrs. Dean
- Claire Gamble as Helen Farden
