= A Question of Honor (1915 film) =

1915 film

- Directed by: B. Reeves Eason
- Starring: Jack Richardson
- Production company: American Film Manufacturing Company
- Distributed by: Mutual Film
- Release date: August 27, 1915
- Country: United States
- Languages: Silent; English intertitles

A Question of Honor is a 1915 American short silent drama film directed by B. Reeves Eason.

== Plot ==
According to a film magazine, "Joe Wallace craving his former life in the city, agrees to sell his mountain claim for $1,000. He refuses to sign an option, but promises to complete the deal on the twenty-eighth of the month. He boasts that his word is just as good as his bond. A letter comes from Nellie, Joe's daughter, telling her father that she is in great trouble. Her husband must have $2,000 to get him out of a business scrape — or go to jail. Joe regrets his bargain with the prospective buyer of his claim. Another man offers him $2,000. Still, Wallace stands by their agreement. When, however, the twenty-eighth comes round, the man is unable to pay and begs an extension of time. Wallace refuses. Closing the arrangement with the other bidder, he forwards the money to Nellie. It reaches her just in the nick of time, and William Fisher is saved the disgrace of arrest. Joe no longer feels the desire to return to the city. So, turning his back on his homestead, he hits the trail again, determined to seek his fortune anew in the hills."

== Cast ==
- Jack Richardson as Joe Wallace, the miner
- Vivian Rich as Nellie Fisher, his daughter
- Walter Spence as William Fisher, her husband
