= The Prospector's Vengeance =

1920 film

- Directed by: B. Reeves Eason
- Written by: B. Reeves Eason; Henry Murray
- Starring: George Field
- Distributed by: Universal Film Manufacturing Company
- Release date: February 7, 1920
- Country: United States
- Languages: Silent; English intertitles

The Prospector's Vengeance is a 1920 American short silent Western film directed by B. Reeves Eason.

== Cast ==
- George Field
- Mildred Moore
- Pat O'Malley
- Harry Myers
- Tote Du Crow
- Charles Newton
