= The Fox (1921 film) =

1921 film

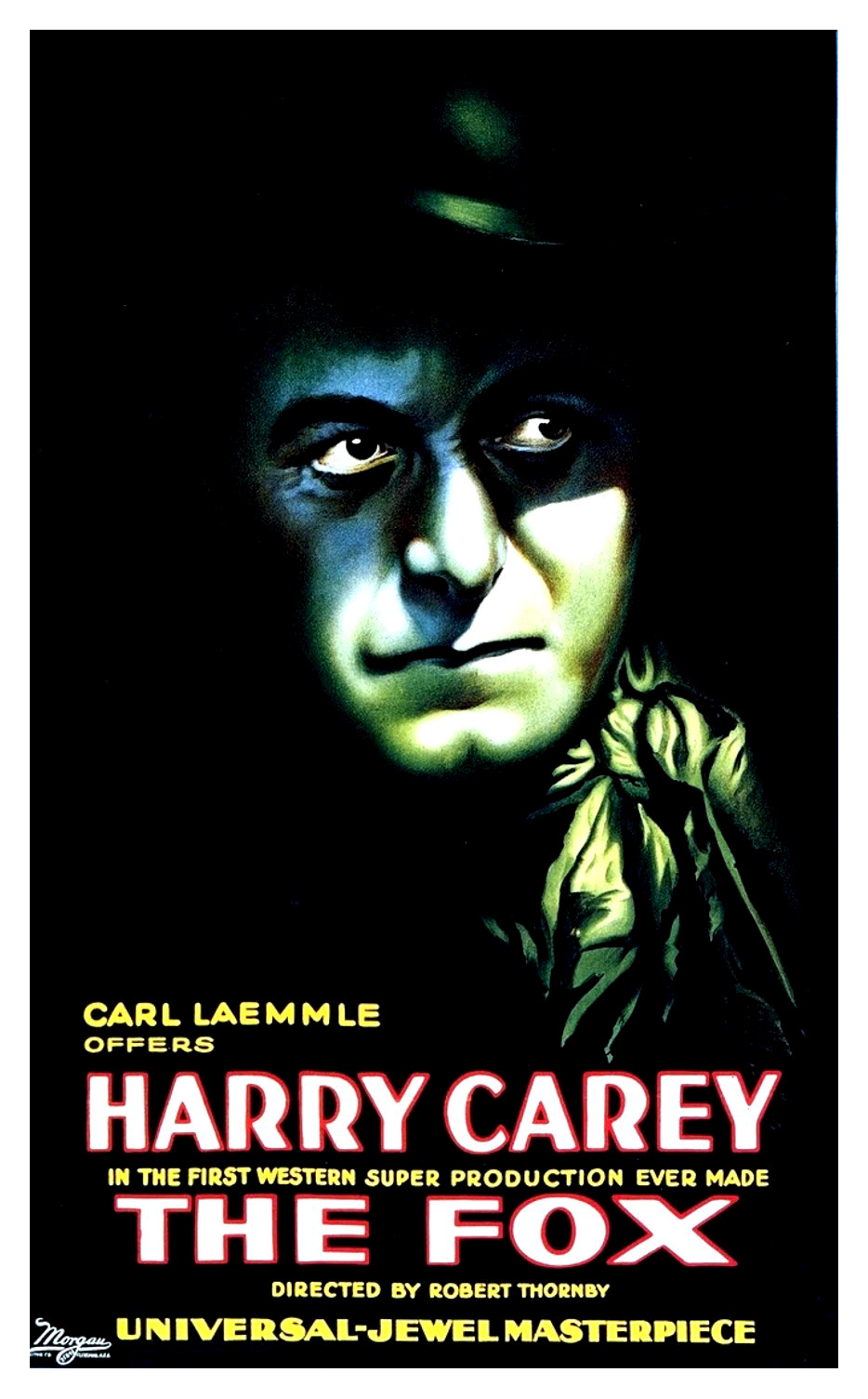
- Film poster
- Directed by: Robert Thornby
- Written by: Harry Carey; Arthur Henry Gooden; Lucien Hubbard
- Produced by: Universal Film Manufacturing Company
- Starring: Harry Carey
- Cinematography: William Fildew
- Distributed by: Universal Film Manufacturing Company
- Release date: July 24, 1921
- Running time: 70 minutes
- Country: United States
- Languages: Silent; English intertitles

The Fox is a lost 1921 American silent Western film starring Harry Carey. Directed by Robert Thornby, it was produced and distributed by Universal Film Manufacturing Company.

The film was advertised as "the first super-western ever made."

== Plot ==
As described in a film magazine, Ol' Santa Fe drops off a fast freight train passing through town. He saves an urchin that had been assisting a beggar with a bear from a severe beating and adopts him as his "Pard". Securing a job as a porter at the bank Caliente Trust Company, Santa Fe learns that bank president Rufus B. Coulter is in league with a bad gang entrenched in the foothills, who have given Sheriff Mart Fraser much trouble. Coulter receives word through the K.C. Kid that a bank examiner is coming to Caliente, so he sends bank employee Dick Farwell on a false errand to cover his tracks. Santa Fe goes out to rescue Dick, who has been captured by the outlaws, and runs into the sheriff lost in a sandstorm. Santa Fe proceeds to the rendezvous of the crooks, frees Dick, and returns for help. With the assistance of some U.S. troops he captures the outlaws, exposes Coulter, and then exposes his identity as The Fox, a special agent of the U.S. government sent out to round up the lawless gang. He also wins the love of the sheriff's daughter Annette.

== Cast ==
- Harry Carey as "Ol' Santa Fe"
- C. E. Anderson as Rollins
- Harley Chambers as Hubbs
- Gertrude Claire as Mrs. Farwell
- Betty Ross Clarke as Annette Fraser (credited as Betty Ross Clark)
- George Cooper as "K.C. Kid"
- B. Reeves Eason Jr. as Pard
- Alan Hale as Rufus B. Coulter
- John Harron as Dick Farwell (credited as Johnny Harron)
- Charles Le Moyne as Mike "Black Mike"
- George Nichols as Sheriff Mart Fraser
- Gertrude Olmstead as Stella Fraser

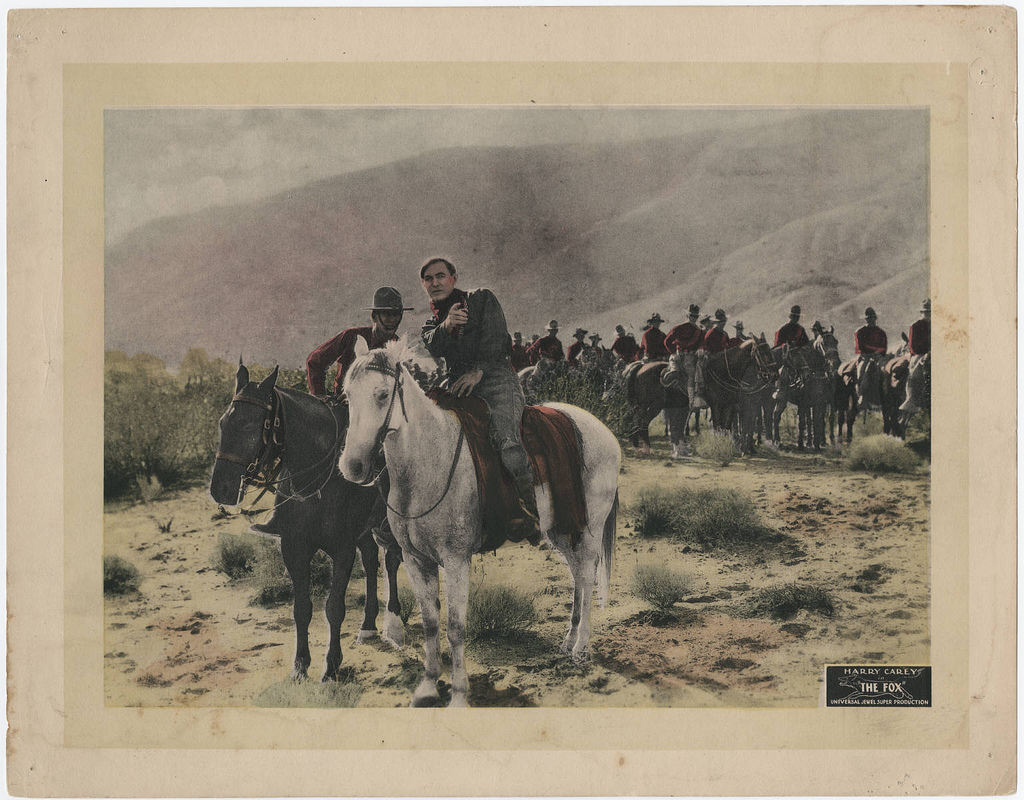
Lobby card

== Production ==
Several of the scenes were filmed against the Painted Rocks of the Mojave Desert.

== See also ==
- List of American films of 1921
