= The Lost Treasure =

- Directed by: Darko Vernic
- Written by: Darko Vernic
- Starring: Veljko Barbieri; Dragutin Broz; Svemir Brakus; Maks Juricic; Mladen Juricic; Goran Pavelic; Pejo Ravlic-Jelena Weiss; Andrija Zelmanovic; Josip Zorica
- Cinematography: Tihomir Beritic; Zoran Hochstätter; Zivko Krsticevic; Zeljko Malnar; Mario Saletto; Darko Vernic; Zdenko Vernic
- Edited by: Bernarda Fruk; Darko Vernic
- Music by: Alan Bjelinski
- Production companies: Crna Ovca; Hrvatska Radiotelevizija (HRT)
- Release date: 1996
- Running time: 95 minutes
- Country: Croatia
- Language: Serbo-Croatian

The Lost Treasure (Izgubljeno blago) is a Croatian film written and directed by Darko Vernić-Bundi. It was released in 1996. The film speaks about, an archaeologist together with his son finishes his research on a small Adriatic island, while at the same time expecting his daughter's arrival from Paris. On the basis of his films, a group of criminals try to find where did the man buried the treasure.
