= Two Kinds of Love (film) =

1920 film

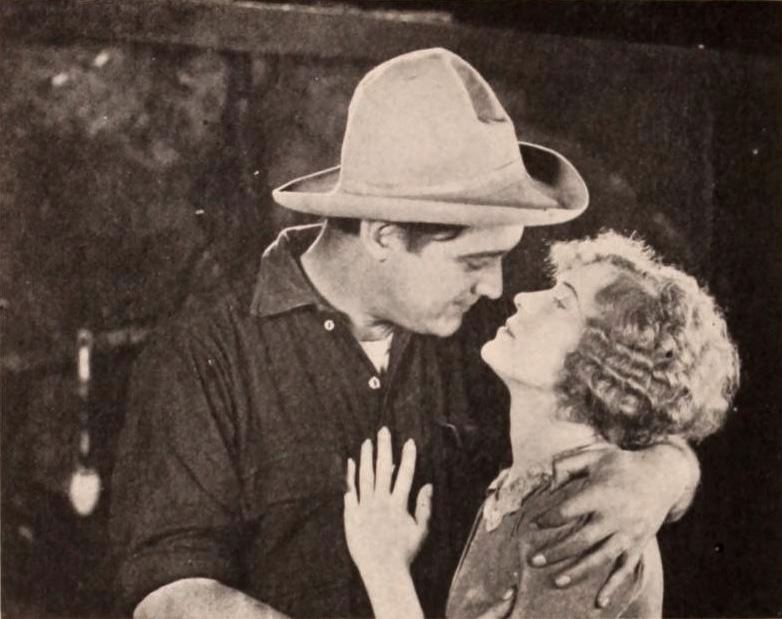
- Still from Two Kinds of Love (1920)
- Directed by: B. Reeves Eason
- Written by: B. Reeves Eason (scenario)
- Story by: John Colton; Douglas Z. Doty
- Starring: George A. McDaniel; Ted Brooks; Jimsy Maye; B. Reeves Eason Jr. B. Reeves Eason
- Cinematography: Virgil Miller
- Production company: Universal Film Manufacturing Company
- Distributed by: Universal Film Manufacturing Company
- Release date: December 1920
- Running time: 5 reels
- Country: United States
- Languages: Silent; English intertitles

Two Kinds of Love is a 1920 American silent Western film directed by B. Reeves Eason and starring George A. McDaniel, Ted Brooks, Jimsy Maye, B. Reeves Eason Jr., and B. Reeves Eason. The film was released by Universal Film Manufacturing Company in December 1920.

== Cast ==
- George A. McDaniel as Mason
- Ted Brooks as Fred Watson
- Jimsy Maye as Kate Watson
- B. Reeves Eason Jr. as Bobby Watson
- B. Reeves Eason as Dorgan (as Reeves Eason)
- Fontaine La Rue as Sita
- Charles Newton as Jim Morley

== Preservation ==
It is unknown whether the film survives as no copies have been located, likely lost.
