= Coals of Fire (1915 film) =

- Directed by: Tom Ricketts
- Written by: Theodosia Harris
- Starring: Harry von Meter; Louise Lester
- Production company: American Film Manufacturing Company
- Distributed by: Mutual Film Corporation
- Release date: January 27, 1915
- Country: United States
- Languages: Silent film English intertitles

Coals of Fire is a 1915 American silent short drama film directed by Tom Ricketts. The film was written by Theodosia Harris, and stars Harry von Meter and Louise Lester.

== Cast ==
- Harry von Meter - John Vincent
- Louise Lester - Mrs. John Vincent
- Jack Richardson - Mad John
- Vivian Rich - Mary Vincent Love, the Daughter
- Herbert Lathrop - Ben Vincent, the Son
- Arthur Millett - Henry Love, Mary's Husband
- Fred Smith - The Foreman
