= B. Reeves Eason =

American film director, actor and screenwriter (1886–1956)

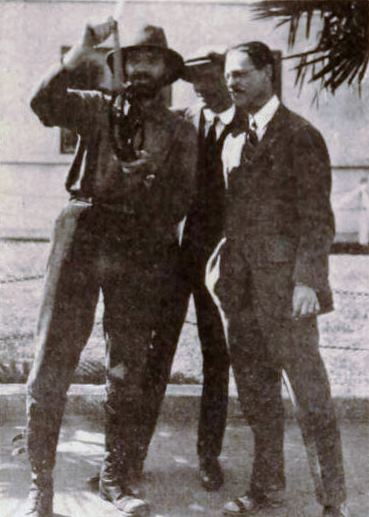
- Eason (left) showing screenwriters Lucien Hubbard and Douglas Z. Doty film from the Western Two Kinds of Love (1920)
- Born: William Reeves Eason; October 2, 1886; Massachusetts, U.S.
- Died: June 9, 1956 (aged 69); Sherman Oaks, California, U.S.
- Other names: B. Reaves Eason; Breezy Eason; Reeves Eason "Breezy" Reeves Eason
- Occupations: Director; actor; screenwriter; second-unit director; assistant director
- Years active: 1914–1950
- Spouse: Jimsy Maye
- Children: 1, including Barnes

William Reeves Eason (October 2, 1886 – June 9, 1956), known as B. Reeves Eason, was an American film director, actor and screenwriter. His directorial output was limited mainly to low-budget westerns and action pictures, but it was as a second-unit director and action specialist that he was best known. He was famous for staging spectacular battle scenes in war films and action scenes in large-budget westerns, but he acquired the nickname "Breezy" for his "breezy" attitude towards safety while staging his sequences—during the famous cavalry charge at the end of Charge of the Light Brigade (1936), so many horses were killed or injured so severely that they had to be euthanized that both the public and Hollywood itself were outraged, resulting in the selection of the American Humane Society by the beleaguered studios to provide representatives on the sets of all films using animals to ensure their safety.

== Career ==
Born in Massachusetts, Eason studied engineering at the University of California. Eason directed 150 films and starred in almost 100 films over his career. Eason's career transcended into sound and he directed film serials such as The Miracle Rider starring Tom Mix in 1935. He used 42 cameras to film the chariot race as a second-unit director on Ben-Hur (1925), the climactic charge in Charge of the Light Brigade (1936), and also directed the "Burning of Atlanta" in Gone with the Wind (1939).

== Family and personal life ==
His son, B. Reeves Eason Jr., was a child actor who appeared in 12 films, including Nine-Tenths of the Law, which Eason Sr. directed. Born in 1914, he died in 1921 after being hit by a runaway truck outside of his parents' home shortly after the filming of the Harry Carey silent western The Fox was completed, just before his seventh birthday.

== Death ==
On June 9, 1956, Eason died of a heart attack at the age of 69. He is buried in Hollywood Forever Cemetery in Los Angeles.

== Filmography ==
=== Director ===
- 1915 : Competition
- 1915 : The Day of Reckoning
- 1915 : She Walketh Alone
- 1915 : The Poet of the Peaks
- 1915 : A Good Business Deal
- 1915 : Mountain Mary
- 1915 : To Melody a Soul Responds
- 1915 : The Honor of the District Attorney
- 1915 : After the Storm
- 1915 : The Newer Way
- 1915 : The Exile of Bar-K Ranch
- 1915 : Drawing the Line
- 1915 : A Question of Honor
- 1915 : The Spirit of Adventure
- 1915 : In Trust
- 1915 : The Little Lady Next Door
- 1915 : The Barren Gain
- 1915 : Hearts in Shadow
- 1915 : Profit from Loss
- 1915 : The Blot on the Shield
- 1915 : The Smuggler's Cave
- 1915 : The Wasp
- 1915 : To Rent Furnished
- 1915 : The Substitute Minister
- 1915 : The Bluffers
- 1915 : The Silver Lining
- 1915 : The Assayer of Lone Gap
- 1915 : The Solution to the Mystery
- 1916 : Matching Dreams
- 1916 : Time and Tide
- 1916 : Viviana
- 1916 : A Sanitarium Scramble
- 1916 : Shadows
- 1918 : Nine-Tenths of the Law
- 1919 : The Fighting Heart
- 1919 : The Four-Bit Man
- 1919 : The Jack of Hearts
- 1919 : The Crow
- 1919 : The Tell Tale Wire
- 1919 : The Fighting Line
- 1919 : The Kid and the Cowboy
- 1920 : The Prospector's Vengeance
- 1920 : Hair Trigger Stuff
- 1920 : Held Up for the Makin's
- 1920 : The Rattler's Hiss
- 1920 : His Nose in the Book
- 1920 : The Moon Riders
- 1920 : Human Stuff
- 1920 : Blue Streak McCoy
- 1920 : Pink Tights
- 1920 : Two Kinds of Love
- 1921 : The Big Adventure
- 1921 : Colorado
- 1921 : Red Courage
- 1921 : The Fire Eater
- 1922 : Pardon My Nerve!
- 1922 : When East Comes West
- 1922 : Roughshod
- 1922 : The Lone Hand
- 1923 : Around the World in Eighteen Days
- 1923 : His Last Race
- 1924 : Treasure Canyon
- 1924 : Tiger Thompson
- 1924 : Women First
- 1924 : Trigger Fingers
- 1924 : Flashing Spurs
- 1925 : The Texas Bearcat
- 1925 : Fighting Youth
- 1925 : Border Justice
- 1925 : Fighting the Flames
- 1925 : The New Champion
- 1925 : A Fight to the Finish
- 1925 : The Shadow on the Wall
- 1926 : The Test of Donald Norton
- 1926 : The Sign of the Claw
- 1926 : Lone Hand Saunders
- 1927 : Johnny Get Your Hair Cut
- 1927 : The Denver Dude
- 1927 : The Prairie King
- 1927 : Painted Ponies
- 1927 : Through Thick and Thin
- 1927 : Galloping Fury
- 1928 : A Trick of Hearts
- 1928 : The Flyin' Cowboy
- 1928 : Riding for Fame
- 1928 : Clearing the Trail
- 1929 : The Lariat Kid
- 1929 : The Winged Horseman
- 1930 : Troopers Three
- 1930 : Roaring Ranch
- 1930 : Trigger Tricks
- 1930 : Spurs
- 1931 : King of the Wild
- 1931 : The Vanishing Legion
- 1931 : The Galloping Ghost
- 1932 : The Sunset Trail
- 1932 : The Shadow of the Eagle
- 1932 : The Last of the Mohicans
- 1932 : The Honor of the Press
- 1932 : Midnight Morals
- 1932 : Cornered
- 1932 : Heart Punch
- 1932 : Behind Jury Doors
- 1933 : Revenge at Monte Carlo
- 1933 : Alimony Madness
- 1933 : Her Resale Value
- 1933 : Dance Hall Hostess
- 1933 : Neighbors' Wives
- 1934 : Hollywood Hoodlum
- 1934 : The Law of the Wild (Le Démon noir)
- 1934 : Mystery Mountain
- 1935 : The Phantom Empire (La Reine de l'empire fantôme)
- 1935 : The Miracle Rider (Le Cavalier miracle)
- 1935 : The Adventures of Rex and Rinty
- 1935 : The Fighting Marines
- 1936 : Darkest Africa
- 1936 : Red River Valley
- 1936 : Undersea Kingdom
- 1936 : Give Me Liberty
- 1937 : Land Beyond the Law
- 1937 : Empty Holsters
- 1937 : Prairie Thunder
- 1938 : Sergeant Murphy
- 1938 : The Kid Comes Back
- 1938 : Daredevil Drivers
- 1938 : Call of the Yukon
- 1939 : Blue Montana Skies
- 1939 : Mountain Rhythm
- 1940 : Men with Steel Faces
- 1940 : Pony Express Days
- 1940 : Young America Flies
- 1940 : Service with the Colors
- 1940 : March On, Marines
- 1940 : Meet the Fleet
- 1941 : The Tanks Are Coming
- 1942 : Soldiers in White
- 1942 : Murder in the Big House
- 1942 : Spy Ship
- 1942 : Men of the Sky
- 1943 : Truck Busters
- 1943 : Mechanized Patrolling
- 1943 : Oklahoma Outlaws
- 1943 : Murder on the Waterfront
- 1943 : Wagon Wheels West
- 1943 : The Phantom
- 1944 : The Desert Hawk
- 1944 : Black Arrow
- 1945 : Salome Where She Danced (chase sequences, billed as Breezy Eason)
- 1946 : 'Neath Canadian Skies
- 1946 : North of the Border
- 1949 : Rimfire

=== Actor ===
- 1913 : The Step Brothers
- 1913 : A Divorce Scandal
- 1913 : Armed Intervention
- 1913 : The Shriner's Daughter
- 1914 : The Miser's Policy
- 1914 : The Return of Helen Redmond
- 1914 : The Hermit
- 1914 : The Lost Treasure
- 1914 : The Money Lender
- 1914 : The Dream Child
- 1914 : The Second Clue
- 1914 : The Smouldering Spark
- 1914 : In the Moonlight
- 1914 : Calamity Anne's Love Affair
- 1914 : A Soul Astray
- 1914 : Beyond the City
- 1914 : The Lost Sermon
- 1914 : A Prince of Bohemia
- 1914 : Sparrow of the Circus
- 1914 : Feast and Famine
- 1914 : The Aftermath
- 1914 : Break, Break, Break
- 1914 : His Faith in Humanity
- 1914 : Jail Birds
- 1914 : In the Open
- 1914 : Sir Galahad of Twilight
- 1914 : Redbird Wins
- 1914 : The Strength o' Ten
- 1915 : The Unseen Vengeance
- 1915 : The Black Ghost Bandit
- 1915 : The Legend Beautiful
- 1915 : The Law of the Wilds
- 1915 : A Heart of Gold : Fred
- 1915 : In the Twilight
- 1915 : Heart of Flame
- 1915 : The Echo : Ferryman
- 1915 : Competition
- 1915 : The Guy Upstairs
- 1917 : Hell Hath No Fury
- 1918 : Nine-Tenths of the Law : 'Red Adair
- 1920 : Two Kinds of Love : Dorgan
- 1928 : The Danger Rider : Tucson Joe

=== Screenwriter ===
- 1920 : Pink Tights
- 1918 : Nine-Tenths of the Law
- 1920 : The Prospector's Vengeance
- 1920 : Human Stuff
- 1928 : The Flyin' Cowboy
- 1928 : Riding for Fame
- 1930 : Trigger Tricks
- 1930 : Spurs
- 1934 : The Law of the Wild serial (Le Démon noir)
