= David Lythgoe =

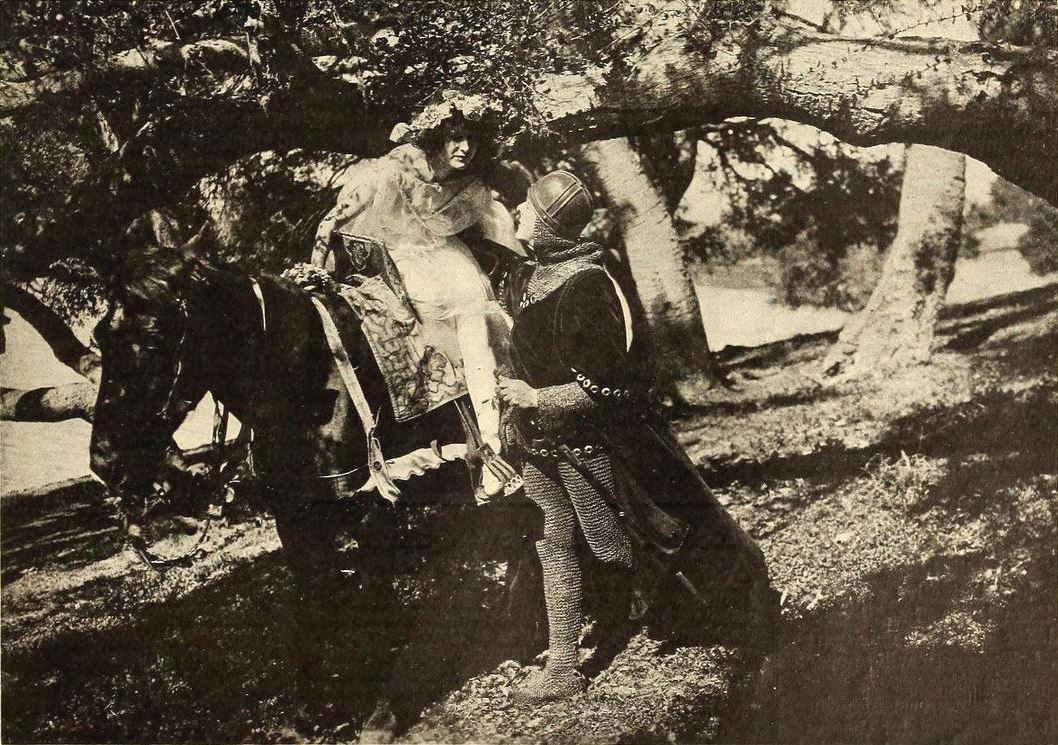
- Still from The Poet of the Peaks (1915) with Vivian Rich and David Lythgoe
- Born: 1880
- Died: year missing
- Occupation: Film actor

David Lythgoe (born c.1880) was an American silent film actor of the early period. He is best known for his work between 1912 and 1915 in short film under the directorship of Tom Ricketts.

He starred alongside prominent actors of the early period such as Charlotte Burton, William Garwood, Vivian Rich, Harry von Meter and Louise Lester in films such as She Never Knew, The Echo and The Two Sentences.

== Selected filmography ==
- At the Edge of Things (1915)
- The Altar of Ambition (1915)
- In the Sunlight (1915)
- The Poet of the Peaks (1915)
- She Walketh Alone (1915)
- The Day of Reckoning (1915)
- In the Heart of the Woods (1915)
- The Two Sentences (1915)
- The Echo (1915)
- She Never Knew (1915)
