= The Little Savage =

The Little Savage may refer to:

- The Little Savage (1929 film)
- The Little Savage (1959 film)
