= Karl R. Coolidge =

American screenwriter

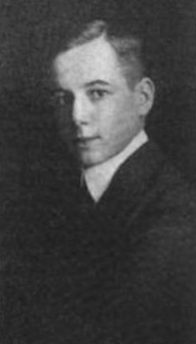
- In the Dramatic Mirror, April 6, 1918
- Born: March 29, 1890; Scranton, Pennsylvania, USA
- Died: March 2, 1964 (aged 73); Los Angeles, California, USA
- Other names: Carl R. Coolidge; Carl Coolidge; Karl Coolidge
- Years active: 1913-1935

Karl R. Coolidge (March 29, 1890 – March 2, 1964) was an American screenwriter. He wrote for 73 films between 1913 and 1935. He was born in Scranton, Pennsylvania and died in Los Angeles, California.

== Selected filmography ==
- The Flame of Youth (1917)
- Like Wildfire (1917)
- The Mysterious Outlaw (1917)
- The Spindle of Life (1917)
- Play Straight or Fight (1918)
- Ace High (1919)
- The Crow (1919)
- The Fighting Line (1919)
- The Gun Packer (1919)
- Kingdom Come (1919)
- The Lion Man (1919)
- The Moon Riders (1920)
- Nan of the North (1922)
- The Steel Trail (1923)
- The Fast Express (1924)
- Riders of the Plains (1924)
