= Mildred Moore =

American actress

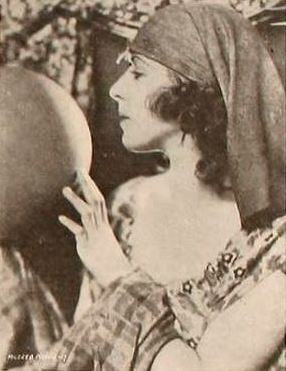
- Born: January 22, 1895; New Albany, Indiana, USA
- Died: August 12, 1941 (aged 46); New York, New York, USA
- Other names: Mildred Lee
- Occupation: Actress

Mildred Moore (also known as Mildred Lee) was a silent film actress who appeared in a string of Hollywood westerns and serials in 1919 and 1920, often starring alongside Hoot Gibson. Her career came to an abrupt end in 1920 with a drug scandal.

== Biography ==
Born in New Albany, Indiana, and raised in Kansas City, Missouri, Mildred won a beauty contest in St. Louis as a teenager, and she eventually made her way to New York City to pursue a career after winning a screen test via a Photoplay beauty contest. She first found work as a dancer at the Roof Garden Review and later as a Ziegfeld girl at Cocoanut Grove. A skilled musician who played the piano, harp, accordion, banjo, and oboe, she was eventually spotted by a director from Los Angeles and recruited to appear in silent comedies.

Starting with the 1917 short Roaring Lions and Wedding Bells — in which she appeared alongside a trio of real lions — she appeared in a string of Fox Sunshine silent comedies using the name Mildred Lee (which may or may not be her birth name). She also appeared in shorts by Eddie Lyons and Lee Moran.

Mildred was eventually poached by Universal to become a Western star, reinventing herself as Mildred Moore. In 1919 and 1920, she starred alongside big names like Hoot Gibson and Art Acord.

Her career was cut short in 1920, when she and actor Jay Belasco — her rumored boyfriend — were arrested in an apartment in Los Angeles for possession of cocaine and heroin. Cornered in Belasco's apartment at Wilcox and Hollywood Boulevard by the police, she reportedly tried to commit suicide by swallowing a large quantity of morphine. She later pled guilty to the charges and was sent to a sanitorium to dry out.

In subsequent interviews with reporters, Moore explained that she had been an addict for many years, having been introduced to the drug in New York City when she first began acting. Despite her professed intent to return to filmmaking after she was released from jail, she does not appear to have notched any credits after she was let out on probation in October 1920. Belasco, on the other hand, continued to accrue roles through the mid-1930s.

She reportedly died of a heart attack in New York City in August 1941.

== Select filmography ==
- The Moon Riders (1920)
- The Texas Kid (1920)
- The Rattler's Hiss (1920)
- Held Up for the Makin's (1920)
- Hair Trigger Stuff (1920)
- Old Clothes for New (1920)
- Non Skid Love (1920)
- The Prospector's Vengeance (1920)
- The Sweet Dry and Dry (1920)
- Some Shimmiers (1920)
- Sweet Patootie (1920)
- Good Night, Ladies (1919)
- The Game's Up (1919)
- How's Your Husband? (1919)
- Does Your Sweetheart Flirt? (1918)
- Hungry Lions in a Hospital (1918)
- Damaged, No Goods (1917)
- Roaring Lions and Wedding Bells (1917)
