= Exit the Vamp =

1921 film

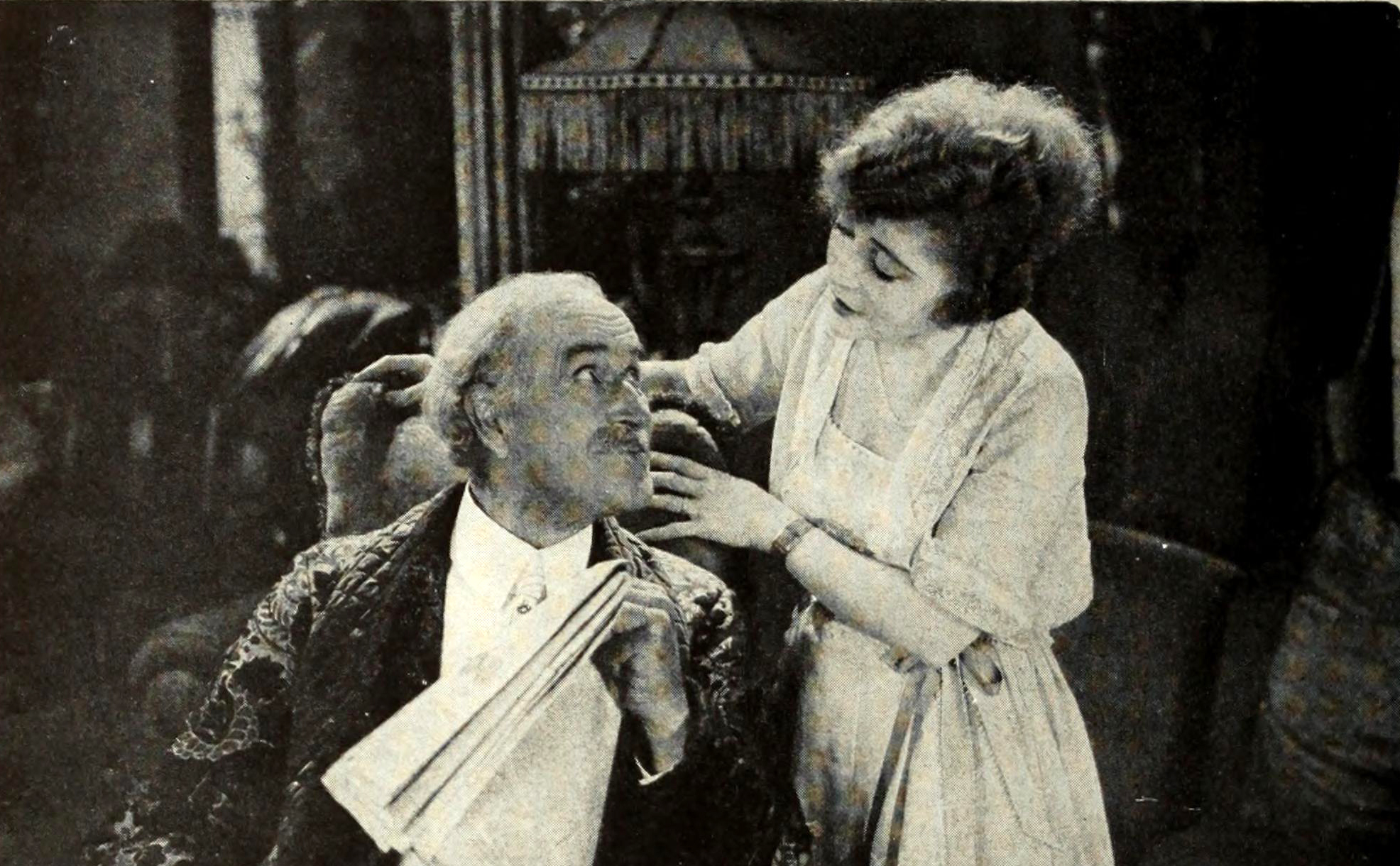
- Theodore Roberts and Ethel Clayton in a film still from Exit the Vamp
- Directed by: Frank Urson
- Screenplay by: Clara Beranger
- Produced by: Jesse L. Lasky
- Starring: Ethel Clayton; T. Roy Barnes; Fontaine La Rue; Theodore Roberts
- Cinematography: Charles Edgar Schoenbaum
- Production company: Famous Players–Lasky Corporation
- Distributed by: Paramount Pictures
- Release date: November 6, 1921
- Running time: 50 minutes
- Country: United States
- Language: Silent (English intertitles)

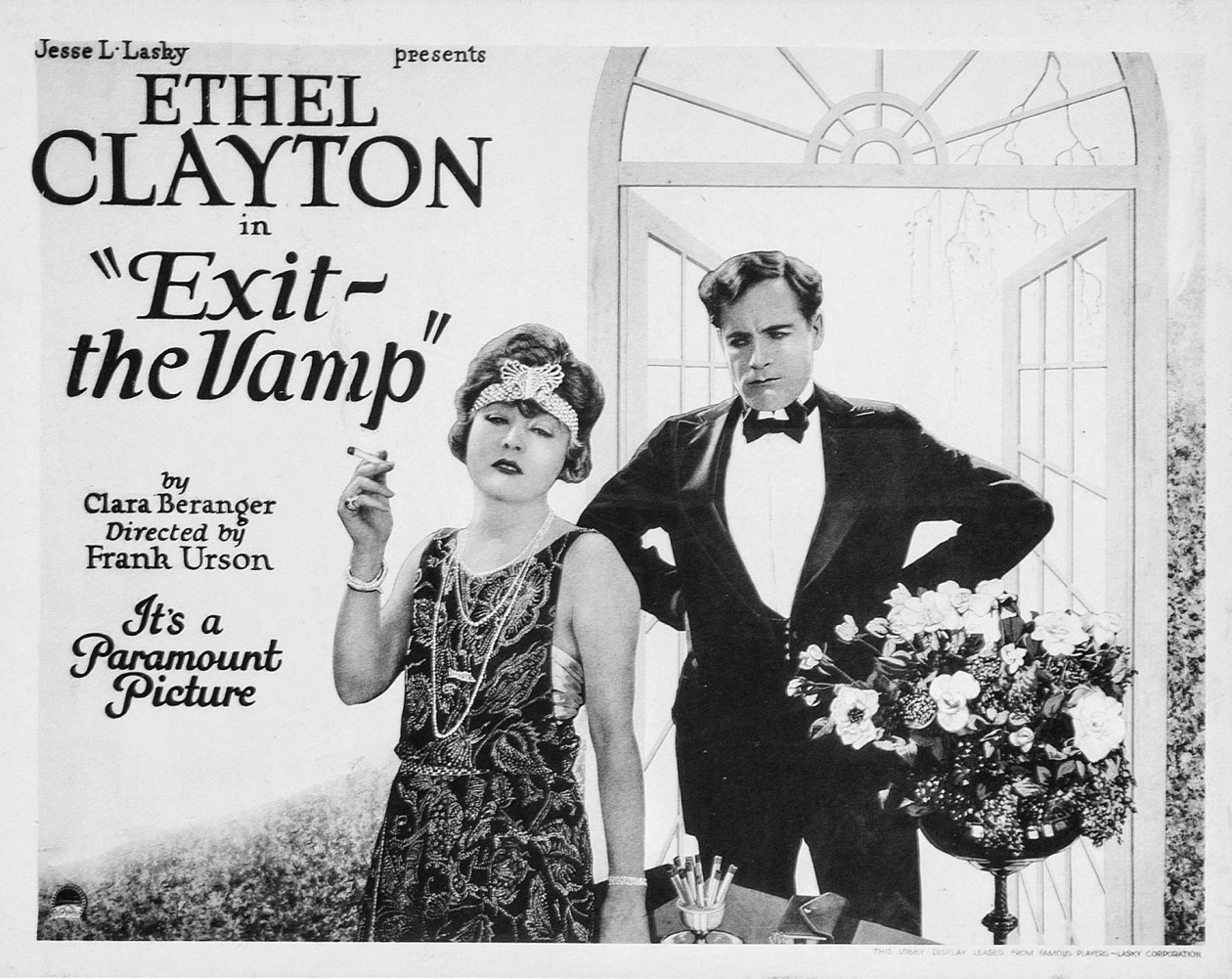
Exit the Vamp lobby card

Exit the Vamp is a 1921 American silent comedy film directed by Frank Urson and written by Clara Beranger. The film stars Ethel Clayton, T. Roy Barnes, Fontaine La Rue, Theodore Roberts, William Boyd, and Michael D. Moore. The film was released on November 6, 1921, by Paramount Pictures.

== Plot ==
As described in a film magazine, successful lawyer John Shipley becomes fascinated by a vampire of the accepted type. His wife Marion becomes aware of the infatuation and adopts the ways of her opponent, pretending incidentally an affection for a World War I veteran whom she knew in France. At a house party to which Marion had invited the other woman, her husband discovers his mistake in his judgment of womanly values and the wife emerges from the conflict victorious.

== Cast ==
- Ethel Clayton as Marion Shipley
- T. Roy Barnes as John Shipley
- Fontaine La Rue as Mrs. Willy Strong
- Theodore Roberts as Old Man Shipley
- William Boyd as Robert Pitts
- Michael D. Moore as Junior Shipley
- Mattie Peters as Mammy

== Preservation ==
With no prints of Exit the Vamp located in any film archives, it is considered a lost film.
