= The Bedroom Window =

The Bedroom Window may refer to:

- The Bedroom Window (1924 film), a 1924 film by William C. deMille
- The Bedroom Window (1987 film), a 1987 film by Curtis Hanson
