= Doris Dawson =

American actress (1905–1986)

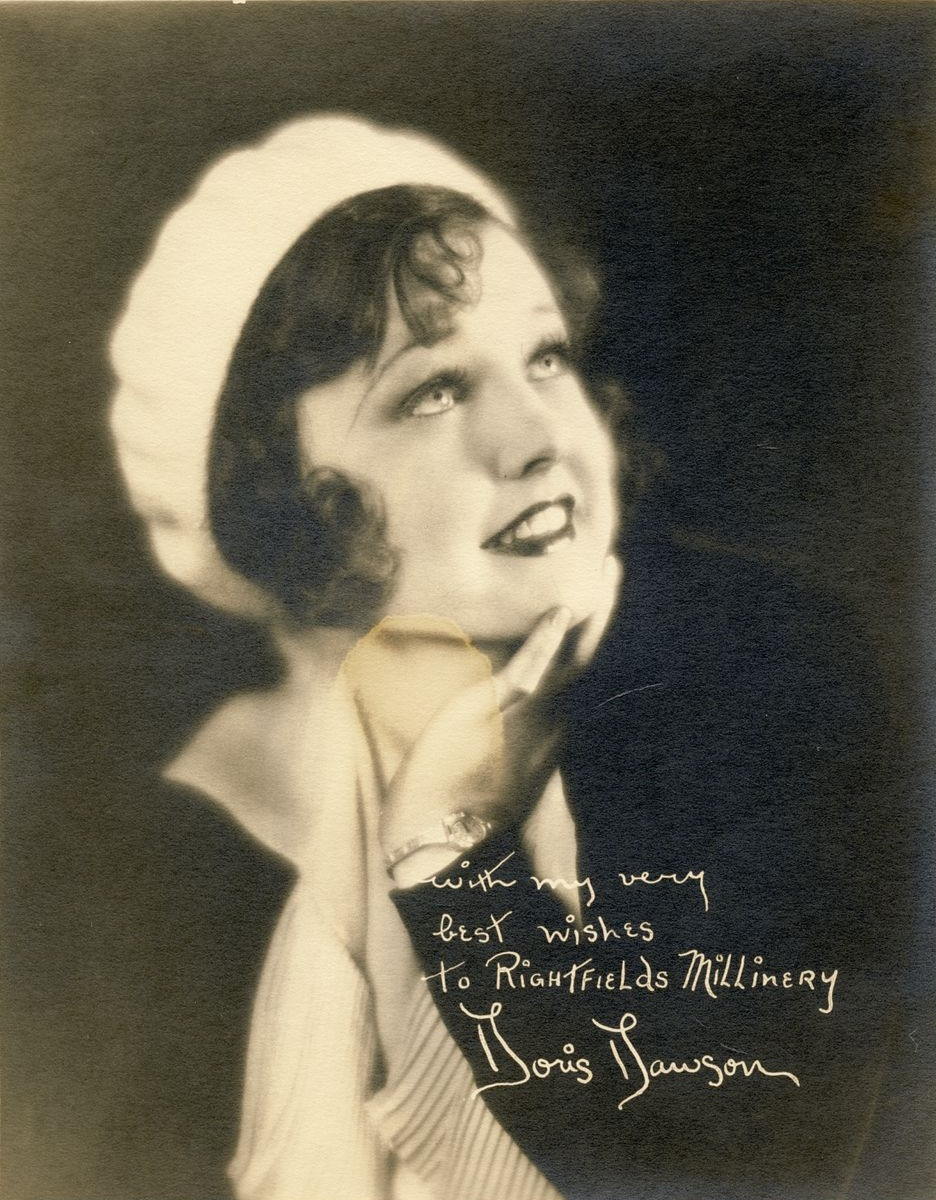
- Dawson in the 1920s
- Born: Doris G. Dawson; April 16, 1905; Goldfield, Nevada, U.S.
- Died: April 20, 1986 (aged 81); Coral Gables, Florida, U.S.
- Occupation: Actress
- Years active: 1927–1934

Doris G. Dawson (later Levy; April 16, 1905 – April 20, 1986) was an American film actress in the early days of Hollywood, mostly during the silent film era.

== Life and career ==
Dawson was born in Goldfield, Nevada in 1905, though it has been reported that she was born in 1909. Her parents were Bonewitz Xerxes Dawson (1874–1952), and Rebecca (née Greenwood) Dawson (1883–1905). Her mother died three months later of tuberculosis. She began acting in the mid-1920s. Her first film role was in the 1927 film The Arizona Night.

She starred in four films that year, and another four in 1928. In 1929, she was one of thirteen girls selected as "WAMPAS Baby Stars", a group that included actress Jean Arthur. She would star in five films that year, including Broadway Scandals, which starred Sally O'Neil.

She was at the height of her career in 1929. With the advent of sound films, her career suffered due to what critics dubbed a grating voice. She had only one film role in 1930, and did not have another until 1934.

== Later years & death ==
Her last film, in 1934, was The Silver Streak, starring Sally Blane and Charles Starrett. With her career dwindling, she retired from acting that same year, at the age of 29. She was married twice. She eventually settled in Coral Gables, Florida. She died there in 1986 at the age of 81.

== Partial filmography ==
- Gold from Weepah (1927)
- Heart Trouble (1928)
- Do Your Duty (1928)
- The Little Wildcat (1928)
- Naughty Baby (1928)
- His Captive Woman (1929)
- Hot Stuff (1929)
- Broadway Scandals (1929)
- The Silver Streak (1934)
