= Mattie Peters =

American actress

- Born: Chicago, Illinois, USA
- Occupation: Actress
- Years active: 1921–1927

Mattie Peters (sometimes credited as Mammy Peters) was an American actress who was active in Hollywood in the 1920s. As a Black actress, few roles were open to her during the silent era, so she often appeared in "mammy" roles.

== Biography ==
According to The California Eagle, Peters started off her life in Chicago, where she worked as a caterer. After relocating to Los Angeles, she began appearing in motion pictures around 1920, although she was hesitant at first due to her Christian values. By the time she arrived in Hollywood, she was a widow with one living son.

== Selected filmography ==
- The Love Mart (1927)
- A Six Shootin' Romance (1926)
- Helen's Babies (1924)
- Barbara Frietchie (1924)
- The Bedroom Window (1924)
- Lilies of the Field (1924)
- The Day of Faith (1923)
- Big Dan (1923)
- Sawdust (1923)
- Scars of Jealousy (1923)
- A Game Chicken (1922)
- Exit the Vamp (1921)
