= The Lost Romance =

1921 film

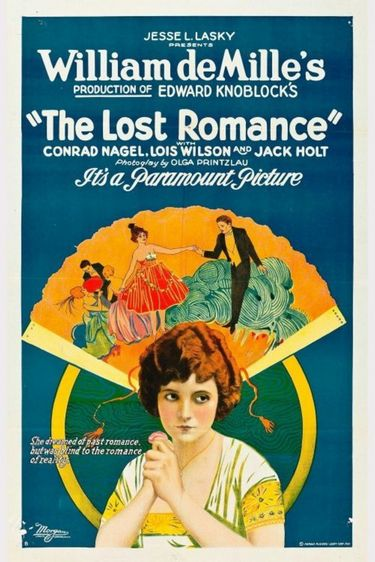
- Film poster
- Directed by: William C. deMille
- Written by: Edward Knoblock (screen story); Olga Printzlau (scenario)
- Produced by: Adolph Zukor; Jesse L. Lasky
- Starring: Lois Wilson; Jack Holt; Conrad Nagel
- Cinematography: L. Guy Wilky
- Production company: Famous Players–Lasky
- Distributed by: Paramount Pictures
- Release date: May 8, 1921
- Running time: 70 minutes
- Country: United States
- Language: Silent (English intertitles)

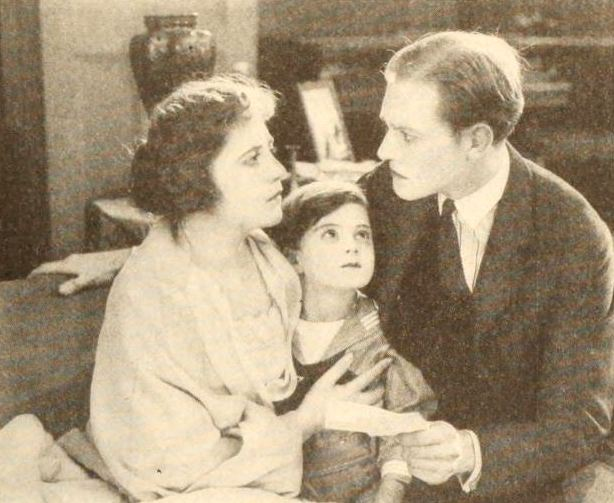
Lois Wilson, Michael D. Moore, and Conrad Nagel.

The Lost Romance is a surviving 1921 American silent drama film directed by William C. deMille and starring Jack Holt and Lois Wilson. It was produced by Famous Players–Lasky and distributed by Paramount Pictures.

A copy is held by The Library of Congress.

== Cast ==
- Jack Holt as Mark Sheridan
- Lois Wilson as Sylvia Hayes
- Fontaine La Rue as Elizabeth Erskine
- Conrad Nagel as Allen Erskine, M.D.
- Michael D. Moore as Allen Erskine Jr.
- Mayme Kelso as Librarian
- Robert Brower as Butler
- Barbara Gurney as Nurse
- Clarence Geldart as Police Lieutenant
- Clarence Burton as Detective
- Lillian Leighton as Matilda
