= The Hell Ship =

1920 film

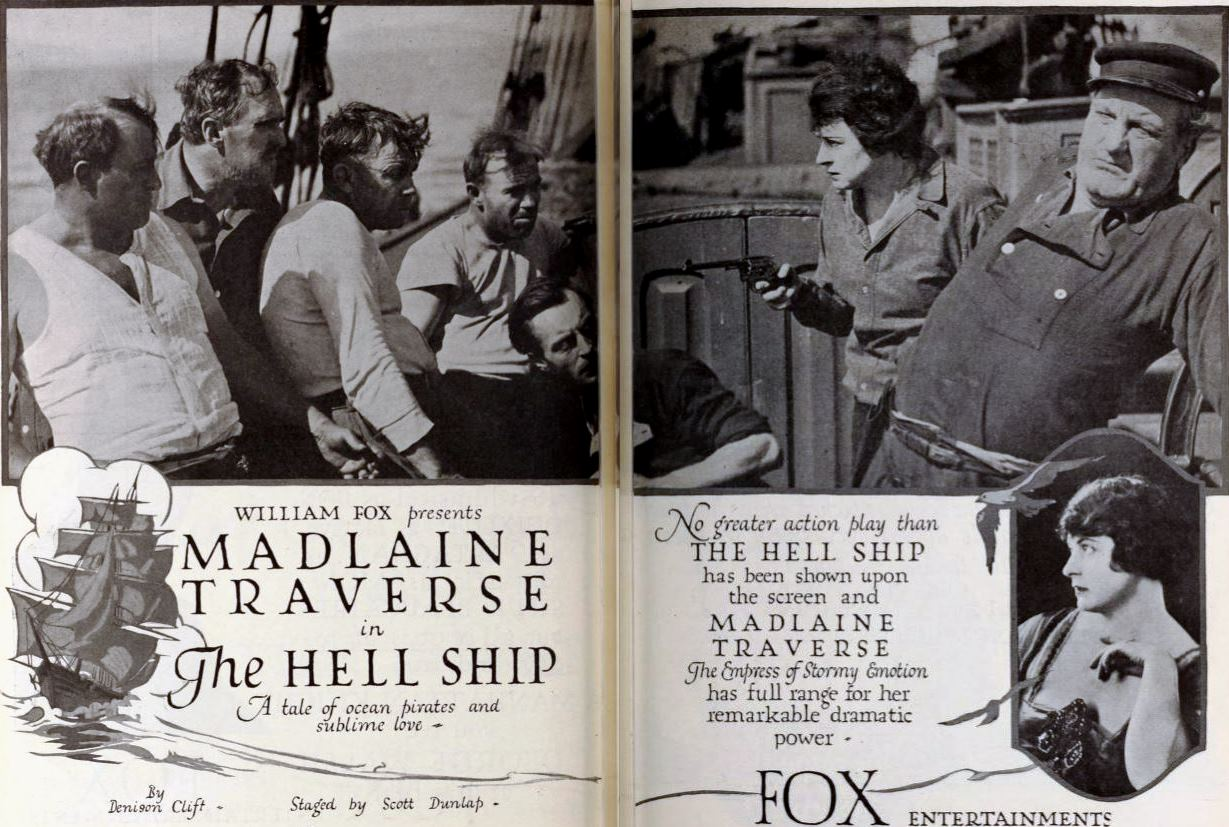
- Advertisement for The Hell Ship on pages 26 and 27 of the Moving Picture World (February 28, 1920)
- Directed by: Scott R. Dunlap
- Written by: Denison Clift (scenario)
- Starring: Madlaine Traverse; Alan Roscoe; Betty Bouton; Dick La Reno; Jack Curtis
- Cinematography: George Schneiderman
- Production company: Fox Film Corporation
- Distributed by: Fox Film Corporation
- Release date: February 1920
- Running time: 5 reels
- Country: United States
- Languages: Silent film (English intertitles)

The Hell Ship is a 1920 American silent drama film directed by Scott R. Dunlap and starring Madlaine Traverse, Alan Roscoe, Betty Bouton, Dick La Reno, and Jack Curtis. The film was released by Fox Film Corporation in February 1920.

== Cast ==
- Madlaine Traverse as Paula Humphrey
- Alan Roscoe as John Hadlock (as Albert Roscoe)
- Betty Bouton as Glory - Paula's Sister
- Dick La Reno as 'Satan' Humphrey - Their Father
- Jack Curtis as Jaeger
- Fred Bond as Thorpe (as Fred Bond)
- William Ryno as Brabo

== Preservation ==
With no holdings located in archives, the film is now considered lost.

== See also ==
- List of lost films
- 1937 Fox vault fire
