= Mabel Lost and Won =

- Directed by: Mack Sennett
- Produced by: Mack Sennett
- Starring: Mabel Normand; Owen Moore
- Distributed by: Keystone Studios
- Release date: June 3, 1915
- Running time: 1 reel (11 minutes)
- Country: United States
- Languages: Silent film English intertitles

Mabel Lost and Won is a 1915 American short silent comedy film starring Mabel Normand. The supporting cast includes Owen Moore as her love interest, Alice Davenport as her mother, and Fontaine La Rue (billed as Dora Rogers) as a vamp.

== Cast ==
- Mabel Normand as Mabel
- Owen Moore as Mabel's fiancé
- Alice Davenport as Mabel's mother
- Fontaine La Rue (billed as Dora Rogers) as the vamp
- Hugh Fay as the vamp's friend
- Mack Swain as the vamp's husband
- Ollie Carlyle as the maid
