= The Dangerous Little Demon =

1922 film directed by Clarence G. Badger

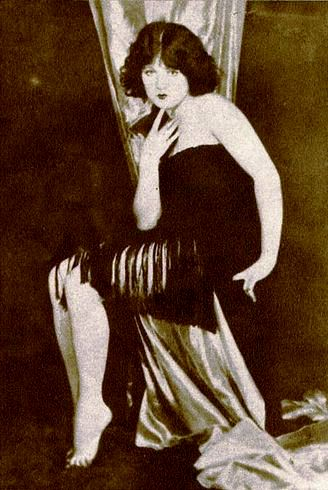
- Still with Prevost
- Directed by: Clarence G. Badger
- Screenplay by: Doris Schroeder
- Story by: Mildred Considine
- Starring: Marie Prevost; Jack Perrin; Robert Ellis; Bertram Anderson-Smith; Fontaine La Rue; Edward Martindel
- Cinematography: Ben Bail
- Production company: Universal Film Manufacturing Company
- Distributed by: Universal Film Manufacturing Company
- Release date: March 27, 1922
- Running time: 50 minutes
- Country: United States
- Language: Silent (English intertitles)

The Dangerous Little Demon is a 1922 American silent comedy film directed by Clarence G. Badger and written by Doris Schroeder. The film stars Marie Prevost, Jack Perrin, Robert Ellis, Bertram Anderson-Smith, Fontaine La Rue, and Edward Martindel. The film was released on March 27, 1922, by the Universal Film Manufacturing Company.

== Cast ==
- Marie Prevost as Teddy Harmon
- Jack Perrin as Kenneth Graham
- Robert Ellis as Gary McVeigh
- Bertram Anderson-Smith as Demy Baker
- Fontaine La Rue as Helene Westley
- Edward Martindel as Harmon
- Lydia Knott as Aunt Sophia
- Herbert Prior as Jay Howard
