= Unseen Hands =

1924 film

- Directed by: Jacques Jaccard
- Written by: Walker Coleman Graves Jr.
- Produced by: Walker Coleman Graves Jr.
- Starring: Wallace Beery; Joseph J. Dowling; Fontaine La Rue
- Cinematography: Alfred Gosden; John J. Pasztor
- Production company: Encore Pictures
- Distributed by: Associated Exhibitors
- Release date: May 25, 1924
- Running time: 65 min
- Country: United States
- Languages: Silent; English intertitles

Unseen Hands is a 1924 American silent horror film directed by Jacques Jaccard and starring Wallace Beery, Joseph J. Dowling and Fontaine La Rue. This was apparently the only horror film Jaccard directed, although he made over 80 (mostly action and Western) films from 1914 to 1936. It was also producer Walker Coleman Graves Jr.'s only screenwriting credit.

== Plot ==
Jean Scholast (Beery) makes a favorable impression on a wealthy businessman's wife (La Rue), and she gets her husband George Le Quintrec to hire him. Scholast works his way into the millionaire's life, stealing his wife and his fortune, and eventually murdering the old man. He later begins to experience hallucinations involving the ghost of the murdered man, and in the end, he is frightened to death by the apparition out in the desert.

== Cast ==
- Wallace Beery as Jean Scholast
- Joseph J. Dowling as George Le Quintrec
- Fontaine La Rue as Madame Le Quintrec
- Jack Rollens as Armand Le Quintrec
- Cleo Madison as Mataoka
- Jim Corey as Wapita
- Jamie Gray as Nola

== Bibliography ==
- Soister, John T. American Silent Horror, Science Fiction and Fantasy Feature Films, 1913-1929. McFarland, 2014. ISBN 978-0-7864-8790-5.
