= Scars of Jealousy =

1923 film by Lambert Hillyer

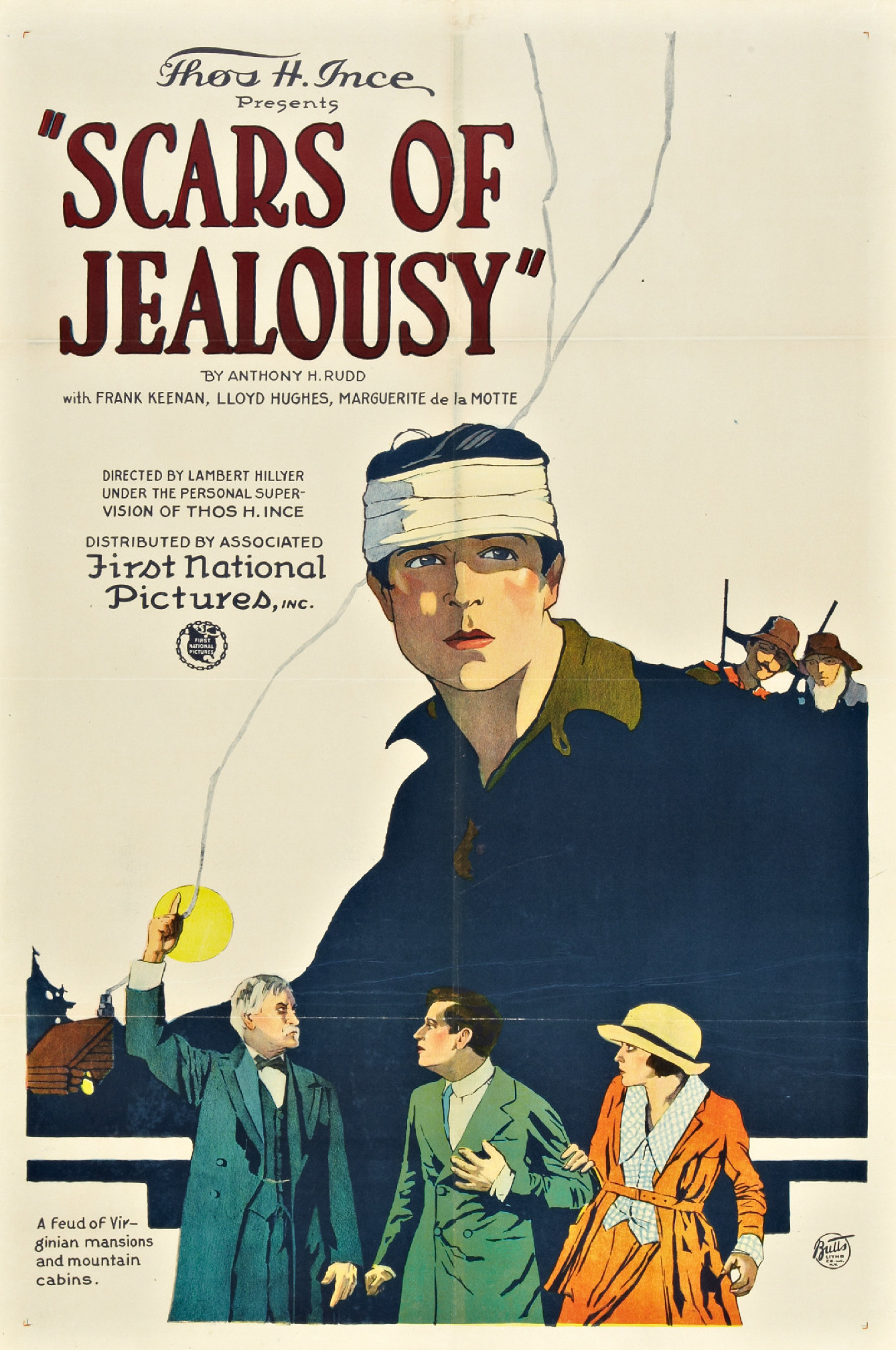
- Theatrical release poster
- Directed by: Lambert Hillyer
- Written by: Lambert Hillyer (adaptation)
- Story by: Anthony H. Rudd
- Produced by: Thomas H. Ince
- Starring: Lloyd Hughes; Frank Keenan
- Cinematography: J.O. Taylor
- Distributed by: Associated First National Pictures
- Release date: March 5, 1923
- Running time: 70 minutes
- Country: United States
- Language: Silent (English intertitles)

Scars of Jealousy is a 1923 American silent drama film directed by Lambert Hillyer and starring Lloyd Hughes and Frank Keenan. It was produced by Thomas H. Ince and distributed through Associated First National, later First National.

== Cast ==
- Frank Keenan as Colonel Newland
- Edmund Burns as Jeff Newland
- Lloyd Hughes as Cody Jacques
- Marguerite De La Motte as Helen Meanix
- James Neill as Colonel Meanix
- Walter Lynch as Pere Jakes
- James "Jim" Mason as Zeke Jakes
- Mattie Peters as Mandy
- George H. Reed as Mose (credited as George Reed)

== Preservation status ==
Prints of Scars of Jealousy survive at the Cinémathèque royale de Belgique, UCLA Film and Television Archive, and George Eastman Museum.
