= Do Your Duty =

1928 film

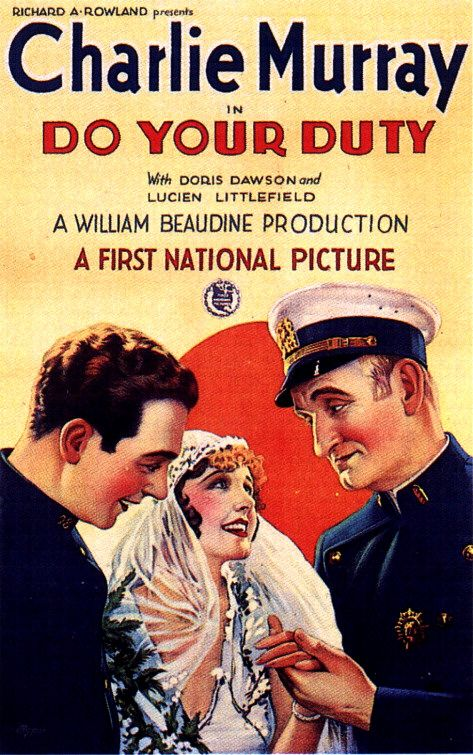
- Directed by: William Beaudine
- Written by: Julien Josephson; Casey Robinson; Vernon Smith; Gene Towne
- Starring: Charles Murray
- Cinematography: Mike Joyce
- Edited by: Stuart Heisler
- Production company: First National Pictures
- Distributed by: Warner Bros. Pictures
- Release date: October 14, 1928
- Running time: 70 minutes
- Country: United States
- Language: Silent

Do Your Duty is a 1928 American silent comedy film directed by William Beaudine. The film was originally planned to be a part-talkie but this was quickly abandoned when Warner Bros. Pictures acquired control of First National in September 1928. The film was unceremoniously released as a silent. Charlie Murray was dropped from the First National roster and three films that had been already planned by First National as starring vehicles for Charlie Murray before the acquisition were cancelled. This was a lost film until March 8, 2023, when a fragment running 1 minute and 30 seconds was rediscovered.

== Plot ==
Sergeant Tim Maloney, a cheerful Irish cop on the New York police force, is the picture of contentment. Devoted to his lively household (including his spirited wife, his two younger children, and his charming daughter Mary Ellen), Tim is especially proud that she is soon to marry Danny Sheehan Jr., a clean-cut young patrolman under the command of Captain Dan Sheehan, Danny's father.

Both Danny and Tim, who dreams of donning his new lieutenant's uniform, believe they will be promoted. But Tim's is not so cheerful. In his precinct lurks Ritzy Dalton, a slick and dangerous racketeer, and Dude Jackson, one of his henchmen, who are plotting something big.

At a surprise celebration for Danny's promotion to sergeant, Captain Sheehan proudly commends his son, and Tim gives a speech as the newly minted Lieutenant Maloney. But the joy is short-lived.

Dalton sets a trap: Tim is lured into an apartment by the screams of a young woman and knocked unconscious. When he comes to, he's been doused with whiskey and tossed into the street, making it appear that he's fallen off the wagon. Meanwhile, the robbery goes off as planned. The disgrace costs Tim his rank—he's demoted back to patrolman.

Ashamed, Tim hides the truth from his family. But as Mary Ellen and Danny prepare for a joyful wedding at the police station, Tim feels he cannot bear to show his face. He makes an excuse and slips away, his heart heavy with shame.

Fate intervenes through Andy, the ever-faithful tailor, who unknowingly steps into danger. While delivering clothes to an apartment, Andy overhears a heated discussion—Dalton, the same woman who framed Tim, and their gang are planning a jewelry heist that night. But before he can warn anyone, Andy is discovered and locked inside a closet.

Determined to make things right, Tim follows a hunch to the same apartment. There, he bursts in just as one of Dalton's thugs is strangling the girl who had helped frame him. Tim saves her, frees Andy, and together they bring down the entire gang in time to prevent the robbery.

With his name cleared, Tim is reinstated to his former glory on the force. He arrives just in time to escort Mary Ellen and Danny to the altar at the police station. As the young couple embarks on their new life, Tim, proud and redeemed, smiles with satisfaction. He's done his duty—twice over.

== Cast ==
- Charles Murray as Tim Maloney (as Charlie Murray)
- Lucien Littlefield as Andy McIntosh
- Charles Delaney as Danny Sheehan Jr
- Ed Brady as Ritzy Dalton
- Blue Washington as Dude Jackson
- Doris Dawson as Mary Ellen Maloney
- Aggie Herring as Mrs. Maloney
- George C. Pearce as Captain Dan Sheehan (as George Pierce)
