= Boots (film) =

1919 film by Elmer Clifton

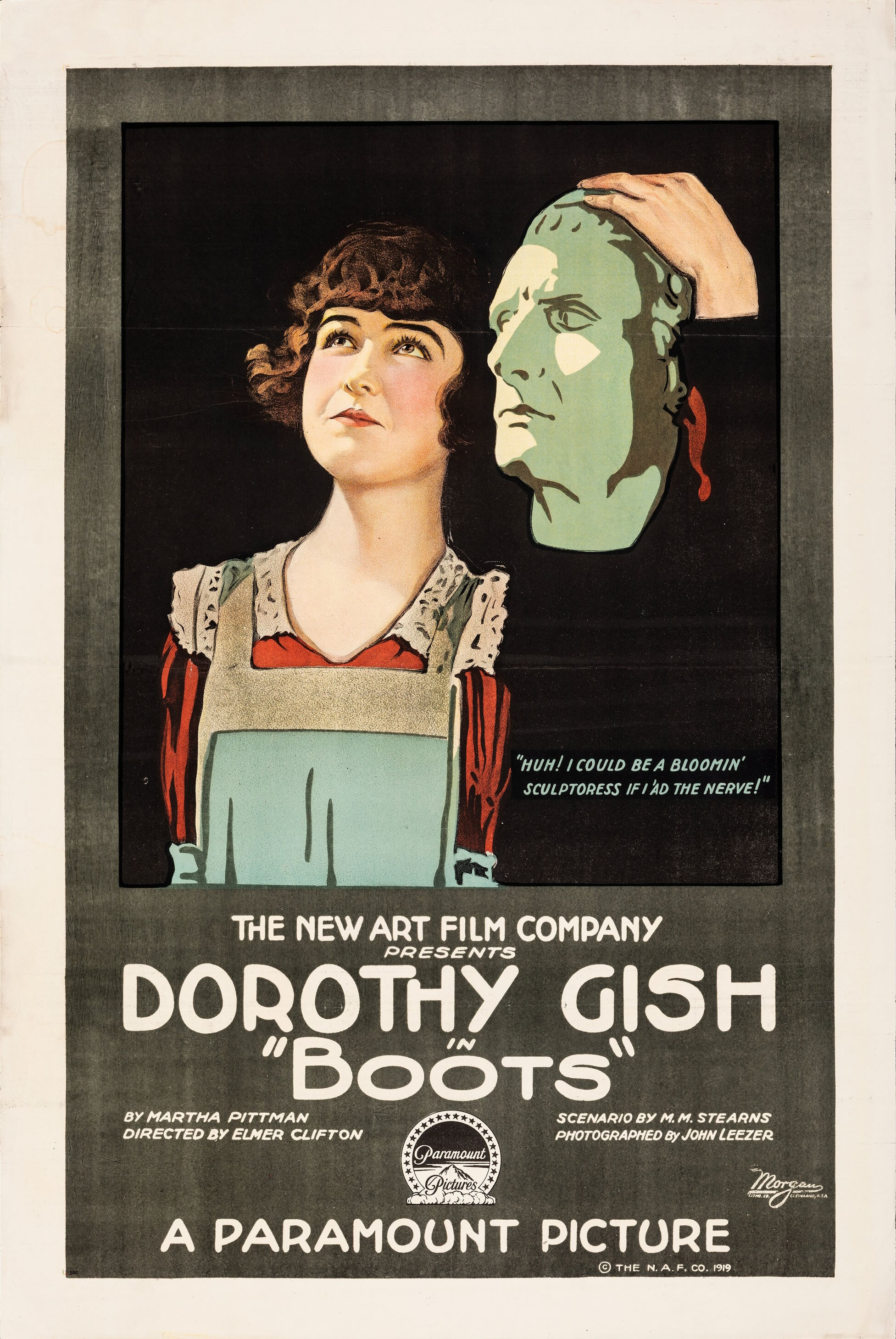
- Theatrical release poster
- Directed by: Elmer Clifton
- Written by: M. M. Stearns
- Story by: Martha W. Pittman; Stanner E. V. Taylor
- Produced by: New Art Film
- Starring: Dorothy Gish; Richard Barthelmess
- Cinematography: John Leezer
- Production company: New Art Film Company
- Distributed by: Famous Players–Lasky; Paramount Pictures
- Release date: March 9, 1919
- Running time: 50 minutes
- Country: United States
- Language: Silent (English intertitles)

Boots is a lost 1919 American silent comedy film directed by Elmer Clifton and starring Dorothy Gish. It was produced by D. W. Griffith, his New Art Film Co., and distributed through Famous Players–Lasky and Paramount Pictures.

== Cast ==
- Dorothy Gish as "Boots"
- Richard Barthelmess as Everett White
- Fontaine La Rue as Madame De Valdee
- Edward Peil, Sr. as Nicholas Jerome
- Kate Toncray as Lydia Hampstead
- Raymond Cannon as The Chauffeur

== Release ==
The film played at the Strand Theatre in Christchurch, New Zealand, shortly before Christmas in 1919.
