= Stars and Bars (1917 film) =

1917 silent film by Victor Heerman

Stars and Bars is a 1917 American silent film comedy produced by Mack Sennett. It was directed by Victor Heerman.

The film starred Ford Sterling and Harry Gribbon. Also appearing were Nick Cogley, May Emory, Hugh Fay, and Gene Rogers.

== Plot summary ==
The story revolves around a simple misunderstanding: the mayor uses a baby grand piano scarf as a bath towel, sparking confusion with his young wife. This classic Sennett-style slapstick setup drives the film's humor through escalating comedic chaos.
