= The Final Close-Up =

1919 film by Walter Edwards

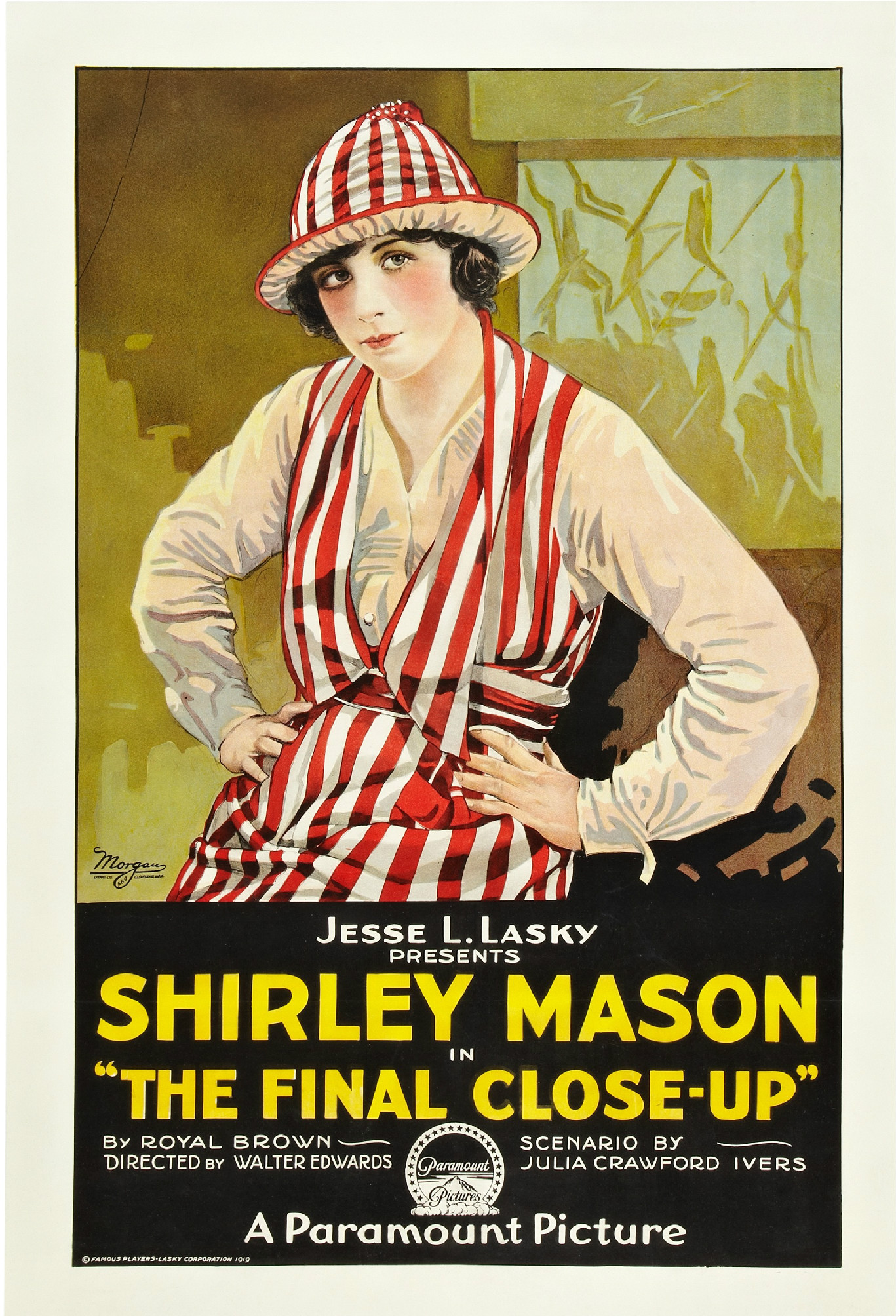
- Theatrical release poster
- Directed by: Walter Edwards
- Screenplay by: Royal Brown; Julia Crawford Ivers
- Produced by: Jesse L. Lasky
- Starring: Shirley Mason; Francis McDonald; James Gordon; Betty Bouton; Eugene Burr; Mary Warren
- Cinematography: James Van Trees
- Production company: Famous Players–Lasky Corporation
- Distributed by: Paramount Pictures
- Release date: May 18, 1919
- Running time: 50 minutes
- Country: United States
- Language: Silent (English intertitles)

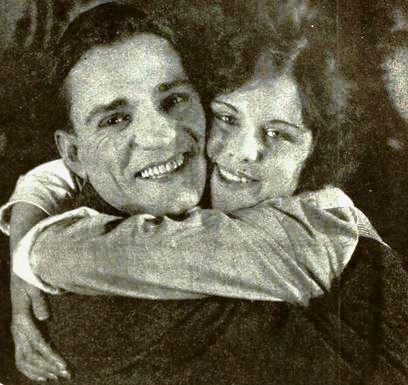
Still with Francis McDonald and Shirley Mason.

The Final Close-Up is a 1919 American silent drama film directed by Walter Edwards and written by Royal Brown and Julia Crawford Ivers. The film stars Shirley Mason, Francis McDonald, James Gordon, Betty Bouton, Eugene Burr, and Mary Warren. The film was released on May 18, 1919, by Paramount Pictures. It is not known whether the film currently survives.

== Plot ==
As described in a film magazine, Nora Nolan works in the basement of a large department store. When she faints from the heat, she is advised to take a vacation. Jimmie Norton, a newspaper reporter gathering materials for a hot weather story, overhears her say that she has but $4.12 to her name, so he borrows $200 from his wealthy father and sends it to Nora, and she departs for Winchester-by-the-Sea. Jimmy follows after being discharged by the newspaper and thrown on his own resources by his father. After a crook steals Nora's money, she is snubbed by the other hotel guests and ends up becoming a dishwasher to pay for her room. After overhearing some crooks planning to rob the hotel safe, she keeps them at bay with a frying pan while Jimmie's father Patrick, who has conveniently arrived at the scene, binds them. The film ends with a final closeup of Nora and Jimmie.

== Cast ==
- Shirley Mason as Nora Nolan
- Francis McDonald as Jimmie Norton
- James Gordon as Patrick Norton
- Betty Bouton as Emily Westervelt-Moore
- Eugene Burr as Lloyd Gregory
- Mary Warren as Maisie Smith
