= Hot Stuff (1929 film) =

1929 film

- Theatrical release poster
- Directed by: Mervyn LeRoy
- Written by: Louis Stevens (scenario); Humphrey Pearson (dialogue & titles)
- Story by: Robert S. Carr
- Produced by: Wid Gunning
- Starring: Alice White
- Cinematography: Sidney Hickox
- Edited by: Terry O. Morse
- Production company: First National Pictures
- Distributed by: First National Pictures
- Release date: May 5, 1929 (US)
- Running time: 70 minutes
- Country: United States
- Languages: Sound (Part-Talkie); English intertitles

Hot Stuff is a 1929 American sound part-talkie comedy film directed by Mervyn LeRoy and written by Robert S. Carr, Humphrey Pearson, and Louis Stevens. In addition to sequences with audible dialogue or talking sequences, the film features a synchronized musical score and sound effects along with English intertitles. According to the film review in Variety, 30 percent of the total running time featured dialogue. The sound was recorded via the Vitaphone sound-on-disc process. The film stars Alice White and features Louise Fazenda, William Bakewell, Doris Dawson, Ben Hall, and Charles Sellon. The film was released by First National Pictures on May 5, 1929.

The film's preservation status is unknown.

== Plot ==
The film opens in the small village of Coma, where Aunt Katie Allen, a spinster who missed out on youth, is helping her lively niece Babs prepare for a night out by pinning a new dress on her. Babs confidently tells Katie that boys go wild for girls who let them think they’re wild, showing her spirited attitude toward youth and fun. Just as Babs rushes out, a man arrives at the local service station with a broken-down Ford, and Babs playfully reassures him the car won’t blow up.

Katie receives the news that she will obtain a $10,000 check from a long-pending damage lawsuit, which will allow her to send Babs to college and fulfill her dream.

Babs heads to Madison Junior College with Aunt Katie, excited about her new life. At college, Babs quickly draws attention, especially from Mack Moran, a confident heartbreaker who boasts of his charm with girls. Mack spots Babs and her friend Thelma arriving and immediately sets out to impress Babs with playful banter and a ukulele serenade. Though Thelma warns Babs about Mack’s type, Babs is intrigued.

Mack invites Babs and her friends to the fraternity house, introducing Babs as his new weakness. The fraternity brothers cheer warmly, and Babs enjoys the attention. Despite her popularity, Babs struggles academically and is reprimanded by a professor for failing a class, blaming sleepless nights caused by partying. Babs brushes off the concerns, staying carefree.

Mack offers to help Babs study that evening, but she firmly refuses, insisting school nights are for studying, not dating. She walks away, leaving Mack to drink water that accidentally splashes in his face.

Babs and Katie are invited by Thelma and other girls to join their club. Babs accepts happily. The girls plan a meeting at the Ice-Palace for Student’s Night and encourage Babs to bring a boyfriend—but “not one of ours.”

At the Ice-Palace, Mack tries to get close to Babs despite her resistance. He gifts her humorous soap “for that schoolgirl complexion,” which annoys her. Mack attempts to cozy up on a couch, but Babs pulls away. Meanwhile, pranksters led by Tuffy play jokes by making phone calls to Babs and Mack, frustrating Babs. Mack defends Babs, carrying her off and scolding the boys. Babs and Mack then share a teasing, tender moment dancing, though Babs reminds Mack she has “lessons” besides dancing.

Mack invites Babs to the Ice-Palace Friday night, but Babs says she’ll go with a younger, handsomer man Sandy. Katie overhears this. At the Ice-Palace, couples skate and dance. Babs watches Mack make a jealous display with another girl and responds by toasting the “weeping women” he has left behind.

Katie awkwardly skates with Mr. Sinkwater, causing laughter and playful mishaps. Mack asks to skate with Babs; she agrees but says she’ll “file his application” first. Together with friends Tuffy and Sandy, they skate and enjoy the scene. Mack announces over a megaphone that Babs has “the warmest little feet on ice” and encourages everyone to make her skate. The crowd pushes Babs onto the ice, where she dances impressively, earning admiration. Mack jokes he could write a “hot song” about her dancing but it wouldn’t be allowed to be sung.

After skating, Mack invites Babs home, but she teasingly declines, choosing to go with Tuffy instead, making Mack jealous. When their car gets stuck in the rain, Mack rescues Babs, carrying her into a nearby shack. Inside, he helps dry her wet clothes and insists she remove her coat to avoid pneumonia. Despite awkward moments, warmth grows between them. Tuffy and friends arrive, causing tension, but Mack reassures them it was an accident and asks for silence as fraternity brothers. Embarrassed, Babs runs away in the rain, driving off alone.

Later, Mack confides to Sandy that he regrets the night's troubles. Katie tends to Babs, assuring her Mack didn’t mean harm and the boys won’t gossip.

Encouraged by friends, Babs attends a big party to lift her spirits. She shows off her bold personality—dancing on a piano, flirting, sharing cigarettes, and leading boys to the punch bowl. Mack watches with mixed feelings.

Mack boasts to his friends he’ll take Babs home. He approaches Babs and a boy lounging on a couch. Thelma arrives, takes the boy away, and privately talks with Mack. Mack says something important happened at the cabin and insists on talking at Babs’ home.

At Babs’ house, Mack tries to prepare her for a shock, offering a cigarette to calm her nerves. Babs teases, suspecting the cigarette is the real reason for the visit. Mack lights it and jokes she’s “woozy” from smoking and drinking. He produces a flask and offers her a drink. She reacts humorously to its strength but drinks anyway. Mack encourages her to “live up to her reputation.” Babs protests the fast drinks, but Mack is amused.

When Babs moves to the victrola, Mack reveals he’s not fooled by her act and has “found her out” as a bluffer. Babs breaks down crying, admitting she pretended to smoke and drink to be popular. Mack confesses he has never drunk alcohol either, just passing off cold tea and ginger ale to maintain a tough image.

They share a moment of understanding, making a secret pact. Mack asks Babs to wear his fraternity pin, which she happily accepts. He pins it on her vest, and they laugh. They dance tenderly.

Katie enters, reminding them it’s Babs’ bedtime, hinting she expects a visitor herself. Mack says goodnight but returns when Babs calls him back for a proper goodbye. He kisses her through the glass door, and the scene fades out.

== Cast ==
- Alice White as Barbara Allen (aka "Babs")
- Louise Fazenda as Aunt Katie
- William Bakewell as Mack Moran
- Doris Dawson as Thelma
- Ben Hall as Sandy McNab
- Charles Sellon as Wiggam
- Buddy Messinger as Tuffy
- Andy Devine as Bob
- Larry Banthim as cop

== See also ==
- List of early sound feature films (1926–1929)
