= Red Salute (1935 film) =

1935 film by Sidney Lanfield

- Theatrical release poster
- Directed by: Sidney Lanfield
- Screenplay by: Humphrey Pearson; Manuel Seff; Elmer Harris (dialogue)
- Story by: Humphrey Pearson
- Produced by: Edward Small
- Starring: Barbara Stanwyck; Robert Young
- Cinematography: Robert H. Planck
- Edited by: Grant Whytock
- Music by: Alfred Newman (uncredited)
- Production company: Reliance Pictures
- Distributed by: United Artists
- Release date: September 12, 1935 (USA)
- Running time: 80 minutes
- Country: United States
- Language: English

Red Salute (also released as Arms and the Girl) is a 1935 American comedy film directed by Sidney Lanfield and starring Barbara Stanwyck and Robert Young. Based on a story by Humphrey Pearson, the film is about the daughter of a US Army general who becomes involved with a suspected communist agitator.

== Plot ==
Drue Van Allen, the daughter of an American general, is in love with communist graduate student Leonard Arner. When Leonard is ejected from a college campus for speaking to the students, a newspaper photographer takes a picture of him in Drue's car and prints it on the front page. When Drue ignores her father’s advice, he tricks her into boarding an airplane bound for Mexico, supposedly to see her aunt Betty off, then locks her in.

She is stuck in Juarez with no money to get home. After a rowdy soldier, Jeff overhears a border policeman warn her not to try to cross into the US, Jeff, whom she nicknames "Uncle Sam", strikes up a conversation, telling her he thinks she should be shot. Despite their disdain for each other, they run up a large bar bill, but neither has any money. They skip out and drive away; then Drue tells him he has stolen a government car. When they reach a border crossing, Jeff tries to stop, but Drue presses the gas pedal and they speed into Texas. They manage to evade their pursuers, but crash into a tree.

They later kidnap P. J. Rooney, an easy-going, henpecked husband, to ride in his homemade trailer. He is glad to get away from his wife, Edith. They eventually con Baldy, a caretaker, into believing they are friends of his employer, Colonel Turner, and letting them stay in Turner's house. After Jeff and Drue dance, he tells her he now loves her; after thinking it over, she kisses him before they turn in for the night, in separate rooms. She later sneaks out and tries to drive away, but the authorities show up and arrest them both.

General Van Allen gets Drue out of jail. He is worried about a newspaper story reporting that Drue and Leonard are going to get married and also about information he received from an immigration official that Leonard is not a citizen, but rather a suspected "paid propagandist" in the country on a student visa. When the general realizes that Drue has feelings for Jeff, he sends for Jeff. After speaking to him informally, the general sends him down to a meeting at which Leonard is supposed to speak. Jeff pretends to have changed his opinion to get Arner to let him talk to the audience. He starts out agreeing with Leonard's position, then shows people what he really stands for. A riot breaks out, and Arner is taken into custody for deportation.

Drue realizes she is in love with Jeff. They get married and honeymoon in P.J.'s trailer.

== Cast ==
- Barbara Stanwyck as Drue Van Allen
- Robert Young as Jeff "Uncle Sam"
- Hardie Albright as Leonard Arner
- Ruth Donnelly as Mrs. Edith Rooney
- Cliff Edwards as P.J. Rooney
- Gordon Jones as Michael (Lefty) Jones
- Paul Stanton as Louis Martin
- Purnell Pratt as General Van Allen
- Nella Walker as Aunt Betty
- Arthur Vinton as Joe Beal
- Edward McWade as Baldy
- Henry Kolker as Dean
- Henry Otho as Border Patrolman
- Ferdinand Gottschalk as League Speaker (uncredited)
- Allan Cavan as Army Officer (uncredited)
- Selmer Jackson as Army Officer (uncredited)
- David Newell as Student (uncredited)

== Production ==
The original working title of the film was Her Uncle Sam. The film was made to cash in on the rise of radicalism in US colleges in the 1930s. Filming started in June 1935. The film features the song "I Wonder Who's Kissing Her Now", sung by Edwards.

It was one of the first anti-communist movies made in the US. This saw it re-released in 1948 with the rise in anti-communist feeling.

The film is also known by its reissue title Her Enlisted Man.

== Critical reception ==
Andre Sennwald of the The New York Times described the film as "simple minded in its discussion of ideas" and was highly critical that when "Hollywood embroils itself in the drama of controversy and ideas ... the studios are likely to hit almost anything but the target". Sennwald identified the film's target as "The Communist Party in America" and wrote that due to the film's mishandling, it suffered no "injury". He stated that the film ultimately defines 'Americanism' as "the glorification of war as an outlet for the nervous energy of our young men, the suppression of political thought in our universities, the abolition of the Bill of Rights with the connivance of the United States Army, and several other doctrines which are less than completely democratic." He concluded that in the current (1935) climate with the spread of "war hysteria, a picture like Red Salute can work immeasurable evil by romanticizing the martial spirit. The film is so obviously propagandizing for the Americanism of the patrioteer and the zealot that it loses all usefulness as a defense of American institutions."

Writing for The Spectator in 1935, Graham Greene praised the film, describing it as "one of the best comedies of the screen since It Happened One Night", and characterizing the acting of Stanwyck and Young as "admirable performances".

In their December, 1935 edition, Modern Screen gave the film a two-star review saying it contained "some good comedy, some first-rate acting and quite a bit of unnecessary flag-waving." The reviewer found the film predictable after the Barbara Stanwyck and Robert Young characters met, and commented "You practically know what’s going to happen from there on. It is, perhaps sufficient to say that the screenplay is in the modern manner, which calls for the hero and heroine to hurl insults at each other for several reels, all of which is a tip-off to movie-wise audiences that they are madly in love. As mild, comedy-drama Red Salute is amusing because of the efforts of the co-stars and Cliff Edwards in a supporting role, but as propaganda for the U.S. Army it falls short of its mark."
