= Broadway Scandals =

1929 film

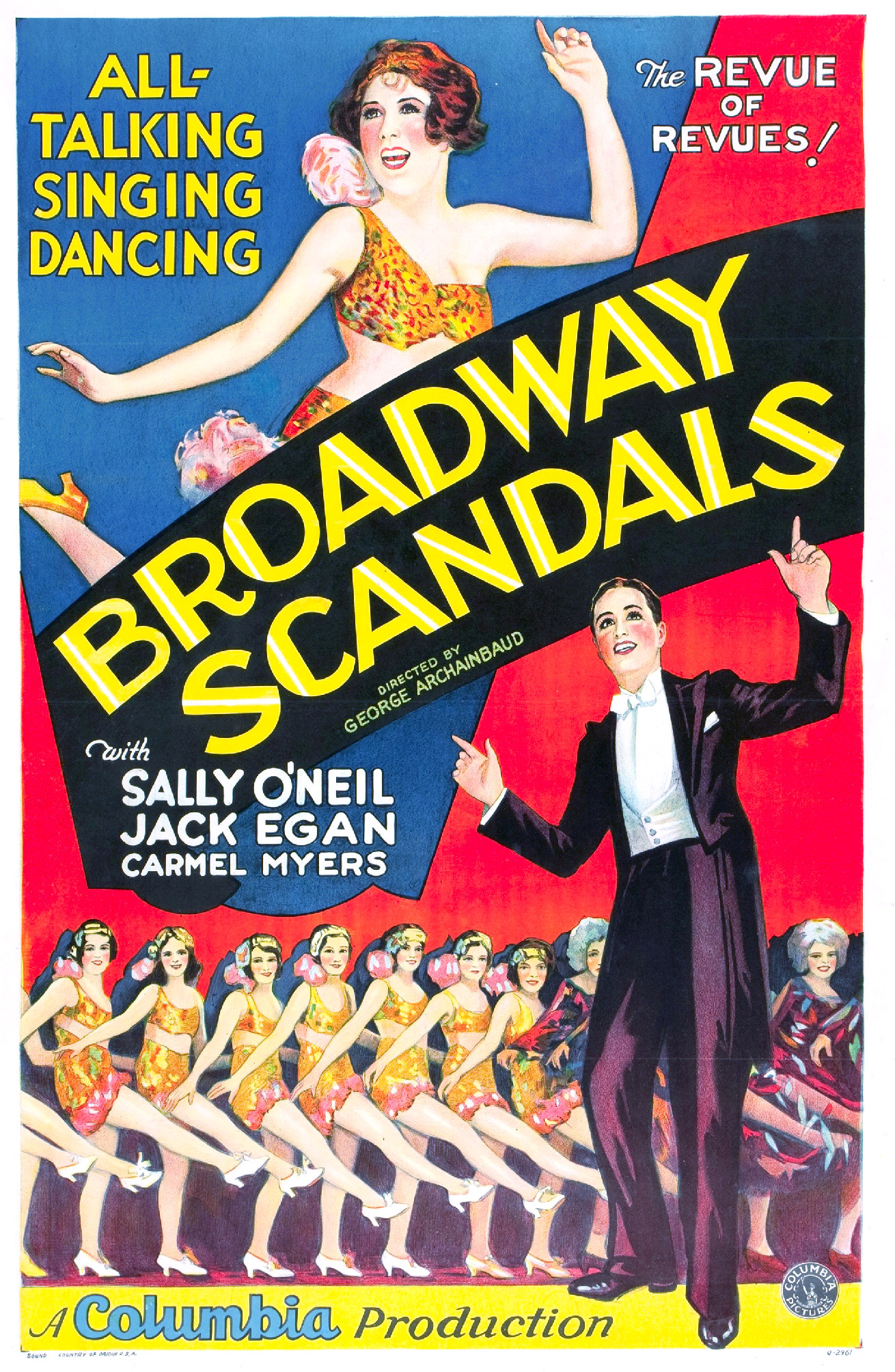
- Film poster
- Directed by: George Archainbaud
- Written by: Norman Houston; Howard J. Green; Gladys Lehman (scenario)
- Produced by: Harry Cohn
- Starring: Sally O'Neil; Jack Egan
- Cinematography: Harry Jackson
- Edited by: Leon Barsha; Ben Pivar
- Production company: Columbia Pictures Corporation
- Distributed by: Columbia Pictures
- Release date: November 10, 1929 (U.S.)
- Running time: 73 minutes
- Country: United States
- Language: English

Broadway Scandals is an All-Talking 1929 American Pre-Code musical film directed by George Archainbaud. The film stars Jack Egan, Sally O'Neil, and Carmel Myers. The sound was recorded via the Western Electric sound-on-film process.

Lobby card

== Plot ==
Ted Howard (Jack Egan), song-and-dance man for the struggling second-rate musical “So Long Susie,” watches the show collapse in a small-town theater. The company manager announces he's closing immediately—without paying the chorus girls. Ted, unwilling to see the girls stranded, spends his last cent to buy them train tickets back to New York.

The entire chorus departs—except for Mary (Sally O’Neil), Ted's loyal sweetheart and partner. A true trouper, Mary sneaks back to share Ted's fate. She persuades him to let her finance their trip home so they can put together a vaudeville act of their own.

Arriving in the city of New York, they rent a room in an actors’ boarding house. They manage only split-time bookings, playing towns like Poughkeepsie, but they're content as long as they're together.

Mary's friend Bobby (Doris Dawson), formerly in “So Long Susie,” meets producer Bill Gray, who is casting a girl act. She brings him to Mary's apartment. Gray offers places for both girls in his show. Ted immediately dislikes him. Bobby accepts the job, but Mary refuses—she will never desert Ted.

One evening Ted, invited by his friend Jack Lane (Charles C. Wilson) to sing over the radio, meets glamorous Broadway star Valeska (Carmel Myers). Already partnered with George Halloway (Wild Bill Elliott), Valeska decides to replace George with Ted and asks Jack to arrange it.

On air, Valeska performs the ballad “Can You Read in My Eyes,” gazing at Ted throughout. Dazed and flattered, Ted follows with “What Is Life Without Love,” the song he wrote for his and Mary's act. When Valeska leaves mid-performance, Ted feels oddly disappointed. Later Jack tells him of Valeska's plan to make him her new leading man—an offer Ted hesitates to take seriously.

While Ted and Mary are trying their act in Hackensack, Bill Gray, Jack Lane, and Valeska attend. Backstage, Gray again offers Mary a place in his show, then tries to force his attentions on her. She calls Ted, who beats Gray soundly.

After the act, Jack relays Valeska's offer to Ted. Mary overhears Ted's refusal—because the offer doesn't include her. Believing she's holding him back, Mary breaks his heart by “accepting” Gray's offer, pretending her decision is selfish ambition. This leaves Ted no choice but to accept Valeska's proposal.

Valeska's show is clearly destined for Broadway success, and Ted's name appears prominently in the press. Mary tries to be happy for him, but hearing “What Is Life Without Love” feels like a knife twist.

When Gray's act folds, Gus Pringle, musical director for producer Le Maire (J. Barney Sherry), offers Bobby and Mary chorus jobs in Valeska's revue. Ted is delighted to see Mary at rehearsal and invites her to dinner. But Valeska reminds Ted of a “business” reception at her house and insists he attend.

Mary understands—until she reads a sensationalized press account of a minor scuffle between Ted and George Halloway. The gossip claims the men were rivals for Valeska's affections and hints at an engagement. Mary refuses to hear Ted's explanations.

Ted still watches for a way to help her. When Le Maire decides to add an “impersonation number” of Ted to the revue, Ted suggests Mary, knowing she knows his routine.

Opening night is a triumph—lavish numbers, chorus girls, comedy skits, and infectious songs dazzle the crowd. Mary's impersonation of Ted nearly brings the house down, and she's called back repeatedly. On impulse, she imitates Valeska, French accent and all, to roaring laughter and more curtain calls. She pulls Ted on stage to share the final bow.

Valeska, humiliated, demands Mary's dismissal. The management reluctantly complies. When Ted learns Mary is to be fired, he quits on the spot, telling Valeska exactly what he thinks of her.

Ted finds Mary back at the old boarding house. The two reconcile and plan to relaunch their vaudeville act—this time swearing nothing will separate them again.

== Cast ==
- Sally O'Neil as Mary
- Jack Egan as Ted Howard
- Carmel Myers as Valeska
- Tom O'Brien as Bill Gray
- J. Barney Sherry as Le Claire
- Doris Dawson as Bobby
- John Hyams as Pringle
- Charles C. Wilson as Jack Lane
- Charles Lane as Radio Operator
- Wild Bill Elliott as George Halloway

== Songs ==
- "Does An Elephant Love Peanuts?"
  Music and Lyrics by James F. Hanley
  Sung by Jack Egan
  Danced by Jack Egan and Sally O'Neill
  Copyright 1929 by Shapiro, Bernstein & Co. Inc.
- "What Is Life Without Love?"
  Sung by Jack Egan
  Music and Lyrics by Jack Stone, Fred Thompson, & Dave Franklin
  Copyright 1929 by Irving Berlin Inc.
- "Would I Love To Love You (I'd Love To)"
  Sung by Jack Egan
  Words and Music by Dave Dreyer and Sidney Clare
  Copyright 1929 by Irving Berlin Inc.
- "Can You Read in My Eyes"'
  Music and lyrics by Sam Coslow
- "Love's the Cause of All My Blues"
  Music and lyrics by Joe Trent and Charles Daniels
- "Rhythm of the Tambourine"
  Music and lyrics by David Franklin
- "Kickin' the Blues Away"
  Music and lyrics by David Franklin and James F. Hanley.

== Reception ==
Photoplay Magazine was unenthusiastic in its review of Broadway Scandals: "If this picture appeared six months ago, it would have looked better, for it is a late entrant in the line of love stories back of the theater curtain." Egan and Myers did well in their roles, while "Sally O'Neil tries hard."

== See also ==
- List of early sound feature films (1926–1929)
