= Betty Bouton =

American actress

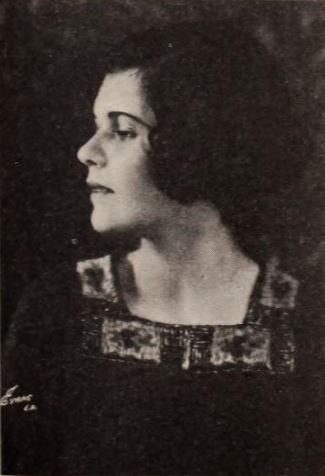
- Bouton in Exhibitors Herald, 1920
- Born: September 10, 1891
- Died: Unknown

Betty Bouton (September 10, 1891 - ?) was an American actress from Pennsylvania. She appeared in 16 films between 1919 and 1924, with her last film being the Samuel Goldwyn part-Technicolor production Cytherea (1924).

== Early years ==
Bouton graduated from the University of Pennsylvania planning to be a social service worker, and she was a probation officer in several cities' juvenile courts. She also was an investigator for a charity organization and a social investigator for a psychological clinic. Acting attracted her attention, however, and she attended the Sargent School of Dramatic Art.

== Career ==
Bouton began acting professionally in stock theater, performing with Nat Goodwin in The Merchant of Venice and later with Bertha Kalich in The Riddle Woman. After those experiences on stage, she began acting in films, including Daddy Long Legs with Mary Pickford. Her early film work was all in ingenue roles.

== Personal life ==
Bouton married scenario writer Arthur Jackson in 1920. He and their baby died before March 1924.

== Partial filmography ==
- Heart o' the Hills (1919)
- Three Men and a Girl (1919)
- Daddy-Long-Legs (1919)
- The Final Close-Up (1919)
- A Man's Fight (1919)
- Victory (1919)
- The Hell Ship (1920)
- Don't Ever Marry (1920)
- The Mollycoddle (1920)
- No Trespassing (1922)
- You Can't Get Away with It (1923)
- Enemies of Women (1923)
- Not a Drum Was Heard (1924)
- Cytherea (1924)
