= Elfie Fay =

American vaudevillian and actress (1880–1927)

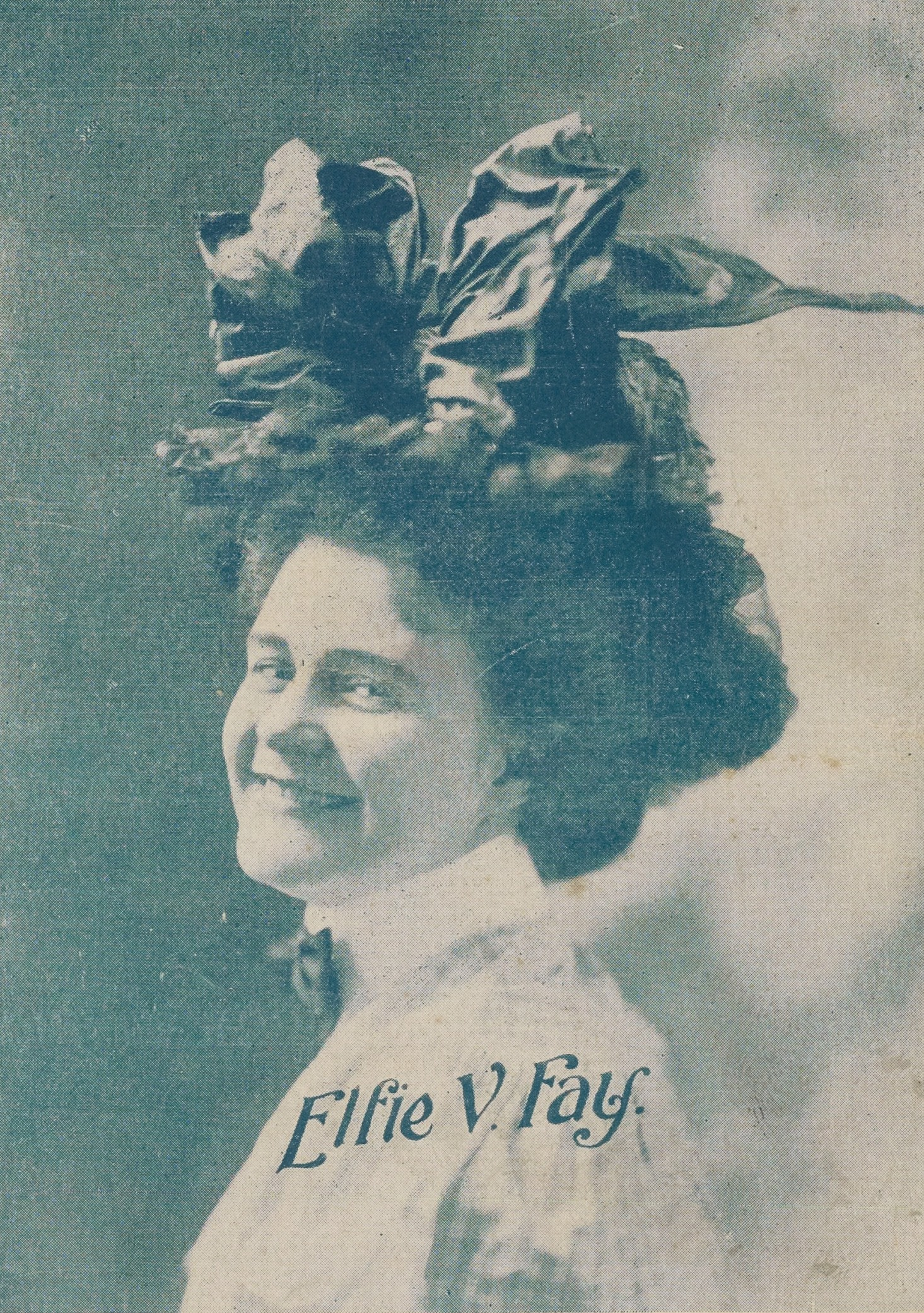
- Fay in 1899
- Born: Elfie Virginia Fay; January 11, 1880; New York City, New York, U.S.
- Died: September 16, 1927 (aged 47); Los Angeles, California, U.S.
- Occupations: Vaudevillian; actress
- Years active: c. 1899–1927
- Relatives: Hugh Fay (brother)

Elfie Virginia Fay (January 11, 1880 – September 16, 1927) was an American vaudeville performer and comic actress.

== Life and career ==
Elfie Virginia Fay was born on January 11, 1880, in New York City, the daughter of an Irish-born comedian and vaudeville performer, Henry "Hugh" Fay (or Faye). Sources give various years for her birth, between 1879 and 1882, but the 1880 census indicates that she had been born earlier that year. Her younger brother was the actor and director Hugh Fay (1882–1925).

She began performing on stage in the mid-1890s, and made her Broadway debut in 1900, in the musical comedy Mam'selle 'Awkins. A "vivacious redhead", she quickly became popular, and was known for ad-libbing and pulling faces on stage. She appeared in other productions including The Belle of New York and The Southerners (1904), and traveled to England to perform. There, she reportedly became briefly engaged to the tea merchant and sportsman Thomas Lipton, and also had reported relationships with more than one British military officer. Over the years, her relationships became as newsworthy as her theatrical appearances.

After returning to New York, she appeared in 1906 in a show written for her, The Belle of Avenue A, based around a song of the same title which she had already been performing. The show was not a success, and Fay filed for bankruptcy in 1910. For the next few years, she toured and performed mainly in Europe and Asia. In 1913, she married another actor, Eugene Rosenblatt, in London, but they divorced after three years. She returned to the United States and married again in 1920, to steel executive Samuel Armstrong Benner, but he died three months later.

In the early 1920s she joined her brother Hugh in Hollywood, and made her film debut in the 1924 silent movie, A Movie Mad Maid. She appeared in several other short films including Trouble Chaser (1926), Hot Cookies and A Perfect Day (both 1927). She also became a regular in the Izzy and Lizzie films produced by the Weiss Brothers.

After the deaths of her father and brother in 1925, her health worsened and she developed tuberculosis. She died in Los Angeles on September 16, 1927, at the age of 47.
