= The Blot on the Shield =

1915 film

- Directed by: B. Reeves Eason
- Starring: Dick La Reno
- Distributed by: Mutual Film
- Release date: October 18, 1915
- Country: United States
- Languages: Silent; English intertitles

The Blot on the Shield is a 1915 short film directed by B. Reeves Eason.

== Cast ==
- Dick La Reno
- Vivian Rich
- Walter Spencer
