= A Man's Fight =

1919 film by Thomas N. Heffron

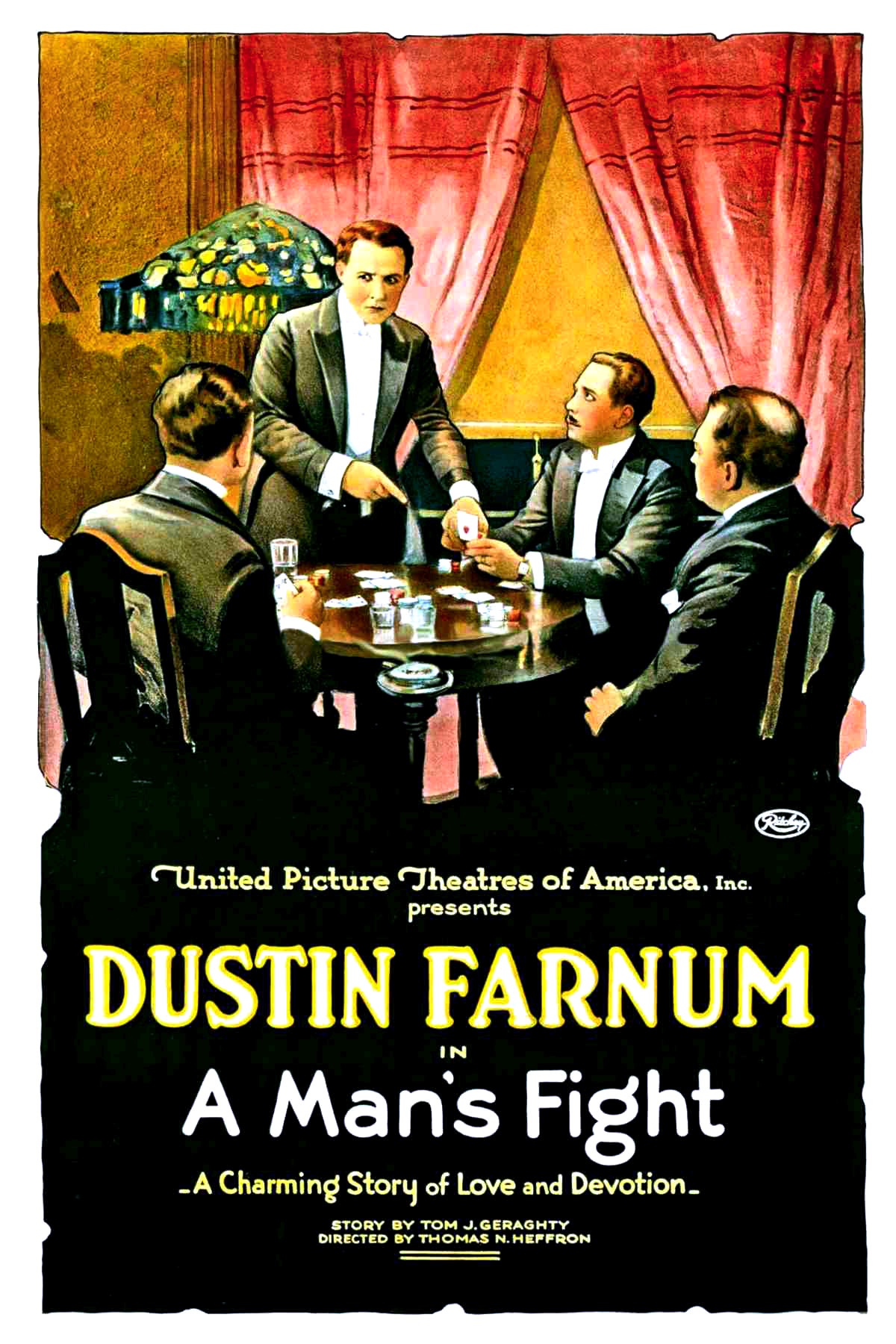
- Film poster
- Directed by: Thomas N. Heffron
- Written by: Thomas J. Geraghty (story & screenplay)
- Produced by: United Picture Theaters of America
- Starring: Dustin Farnum; Lois Wilson
- Cinematography: Robert Newhard
- Distributed by: United Picture Theaters of America
- Release date: August 11, 1919
- Running time: 50 minutes
- Country: United States
- Language: Silent (English intertitles)

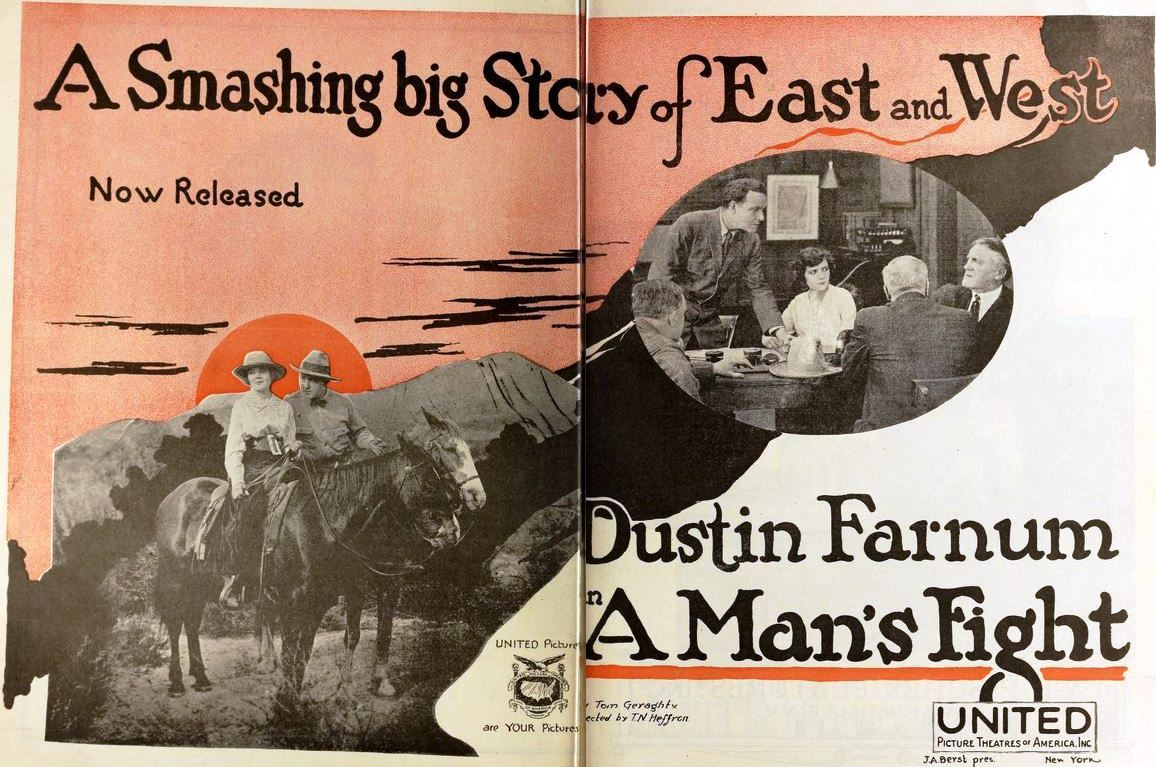
trade ad for the film

A Man's Fight is a lost 1919 American silent drama film directed by Thomas N. Heffron and starring Dustin Farnum and Lois Wilson.

== Plot ==
As described in a film magazine, wealthy clubman Roger Carr (Farnum) assumes responsibility for a murder for which he believes his sister is guilty. He serves his sentence and returns home only to find that his father will not accept him back as he has besmirched the family name. His sister has entered a convent. He goes west and engages in his profession, mining engineer, soon becoming the leader of the independent miner operators against trust persecution. Here he meets and learns to love a western girl that works as his stenographer. When success is about to crown his efforts, his antagonists discover his prison record and use it against him. Then his sister appears with a signed confession of a butler, formerly in their employ, who told the truth of the murder on his dying bed. This results in a happy ending.

== Cast ==
- Dustin Farnum as Roger Carr
- Dorothy Wallace as Ethel Carr
- J. Barney Sherry as David Carr
- Wedgwood Nowell as Norman Evans
- Harry von Meter as Jarvis
- Lois Wilson as Mary Tompkins
- Miles McCarthy as Oliver Dale
- Betty Bouton as Avis Dale
- Dick La Reno as Logan
- Aggie Herring as Mrs. Murphy
- Bert Appling as Callahan
