= Gold from Weepah =

1927 film

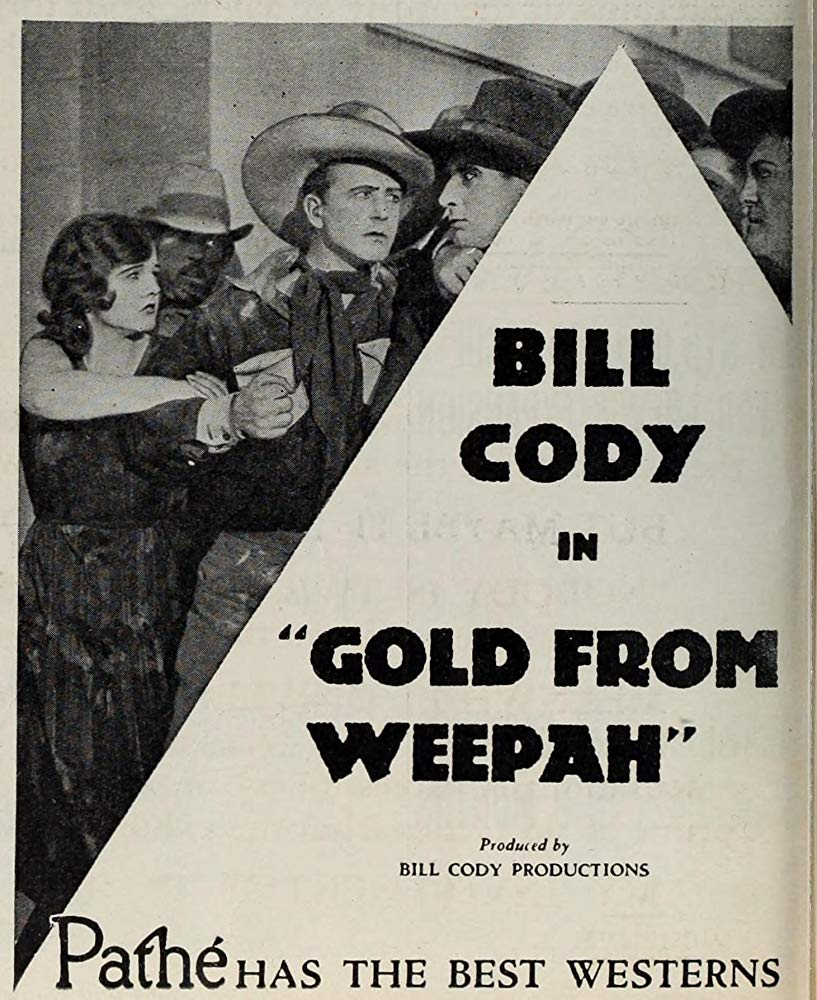
- Directed by: William Bertram
- Written by: Bill Cody; L. V. Jefferson
- Starring: Bill Cody; Doris Dawson; Dick La Reno
- Cinematography: David Smith; Ernest F. Smith
- Production company: Bill Cody Productions
- Distributed by: Pathé Exchange
- Release date: November 20, 1927
- Country: United States
- Languages: Silent; English intertitles

Gold from Weepah is a 1927 American silent Western film directed by William Bertram and starring Bill Cody, Doris Dawson and Dick La Reno.

== Cast ==
- Bill Cody as Bill Carson
- Doris Dawson as Elsie Blaine
- Dick La Reno
- Joseph Harrington
- Fontaine La Rue
- David Dunbar
