= Fontaine La Rue =

American actress

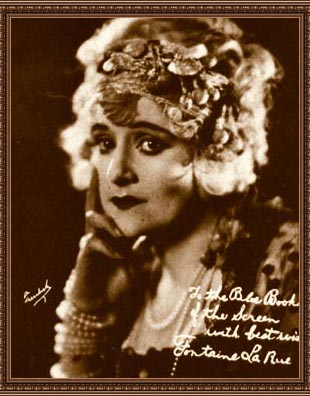
- La Rue in 1923
- Born: Matilda Fernandez; July 24, 1890; Hermosillo, Mexico.
- Died: September 13, 1964 (aged 72); Los Angeles, California
- Resting place: Calvary Cemetery, Los Angeles
- Other name: Dora Rodgers
- Occupation: Actress
- Spouse(s): Victor Garcia Rojas, Wayne Hancock
- Children: Victor Paul, Matilda Garcia, Victoria Grace

Matilda Fernández, stage name Fontaine La Rue (July 18, 1890 in Hermosillo, Mexico – September 13, 1964) was an American silent film actress appearing in films from 1918 to 1929. Her career ended with the advent of talkies.

She was one of seven children born to Diego and Carlotta Monreal Fernandez. After immigrating to the United States in 1907, Matilda married Victor Garcia Rojas. The couple had three children, Victor Paul, Matilda Garcia, and Victoria Grace.

After the couple divorced, Matilda entered show business. She got her start on stage as a toe dancer and in musical comedy. She toured with the Trimble Musical Comedy Company in 1914 before breaking into films the following year in comedy shorts for Keystone.

She first used the name Dora Rodgers, but reinvented herself with the name Fontaine La Rue, tiring of playing vamps. On occasions she would switch between the names. Notably she appeared in the lost film, A Blind Bargain with Lon Chaney.

After a lengthy love affair with actor Nelson McDowell, Fontaine married real estate broker Wayne Hancock and retired from the screen.

The Keystone Vamp died of Acute Myelogenous Leukemia on September 13, 1964, at UCLA Medical Center.

"She was a character and a half, a real beauty in the day when beauty was really looked at," her grandson Alan Bradshaw said to author Michael G. Ankerich.

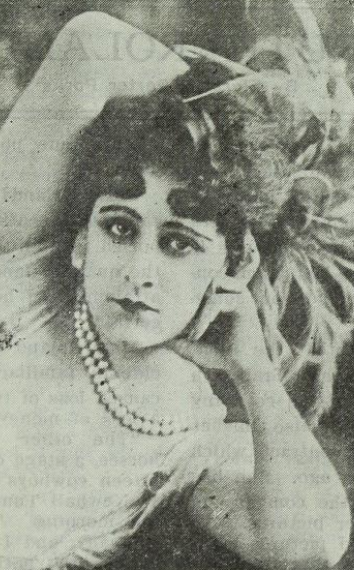
Fontaine La Rue, from a 1919 publication

== Selected filmography ==
- Fatty and Mabel at the San Diego Exposition (1915) (short)
- Love, Loot and Crash (1915) (short)
- Mabel Lost and Won (1915) (short)
- Cactus Nell (1917(*short)
- Cleopatsy (1918) (short)
- Boots (1919)
- The Man Beneath (1919)
- The Woman Under Cover (1919)
- The Fatal Sign (1920)
- An Adventuress (1920)
- Human Stuff (1920)
- The Sins of Rosanne (1920)
- The Faith Healer (1921)
- The Lost Romance (1921)
- Beyond (1921)
- The Great Impersonation (1921)
- Exit the Vamp (1921)
- Oh, Mabel Behave (1922)
- The Dangerous Little Demon (1922)
- The Bearcat (1922)
- The Radio King (1922)
- A Blind Bargain (1923)
- Daughters of Today (1924)
- Unseen Hands (1924)
- Trigger Fingers (1924)
- The Torrent (1924)
- His New York Wife (1926)
- Gold from Weepah (1927)
- West of the Rockies (1929)
