= Dick La Reno =

American actor (1863–1945)

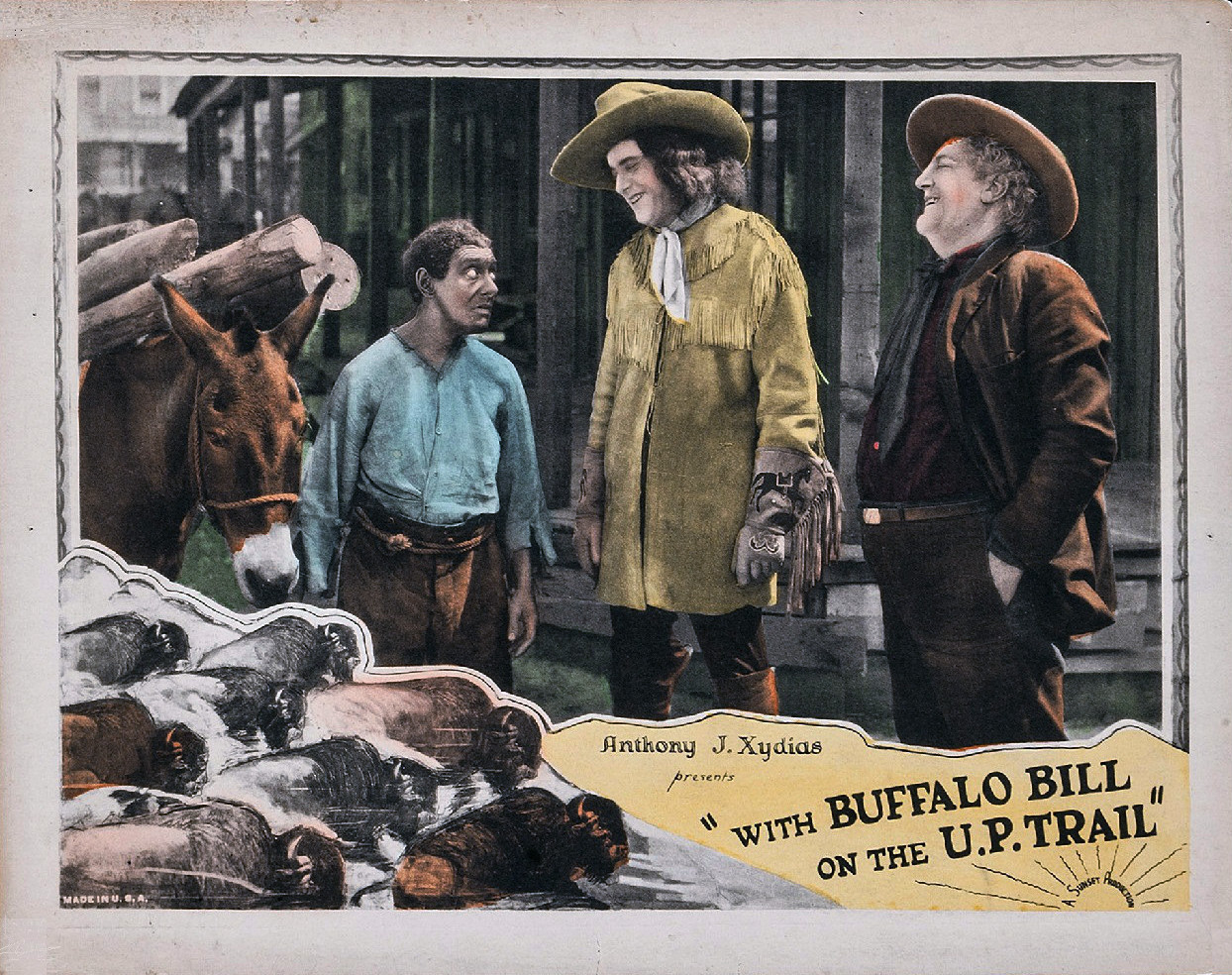
- La Reno (right) on lobby card for With Buffalo Bill on the U.P. Trail (1926)
- Born: October 31, 1863; Ireland, United Kingdom
- Died: July 26, 1945 (aged 81); Hollywood, California, US
- Occupation: Actor
- Years active: 1914–1931

Dick La Reno (October 31, 1863 – July 26, 1945) was an American film actor of the silent era. He appeared in more than 80 films between 1914 and 1931. He was born in Ireland and died in Hollywood, California.

== Selected filmography ==
- Rose of the Rancho (1914)
- The Man from Home (1914)
- The Virginian (1914)
- The Master Mind (1914)
- Brewster's Millions (1914)
- The Squaw Man (1914)
- The Cheat (1915)
- The Buzzard's Shadow (1915)
- The Blot on the Shield (1915)
- The Love Route (1915)
- The Warrens of Virginia (1915)
- The Other Side of the Door (1916)
- Black Orchids (1917)
- Pay Me! (1917)
- The Spindle of Life (1917)
- The Reward of the Faithless (1917)
- The Gray Ghost (1917)
- Fires of Rebellion (1917)
- Bringing Home Father (1917)
- Polly Redhead (1917)
- The Little Orphan (1917)
- Mr. Logan, U.S.A. (1918)
- The Midnight Stage (1919)
- A White Man's Chance (1919)
- A Man's Fight (1919)
- The Hell Ship (1920)
- The Spirit of Good (1920)
- Under Crimson Skies (1920)
- The Land of Jazz (1920)
- Two Moons (1920)
- A Daughter of the Law (1921)
- Trimmed (1922)
- Out of the Silent North (1922)
- One Eighth Apache (1922)
- Single Handed (1923)
- Playing It Wild (1923)
- Oh, You Tony! (1924)
- The Danger Rider (1924)
- With Buffalo Bill on the U. P. Trail (1926)
- General Custer at the Little Big Horn (1926)
- The High Hand (1926)
- You'd Be Surprised (1926)
- The Silent Rider (1927)
- Gold from Weepah (1927)
- The Long Loop on the Pecos (1927)
