= The Faith Healer =

1921 film by George Melford

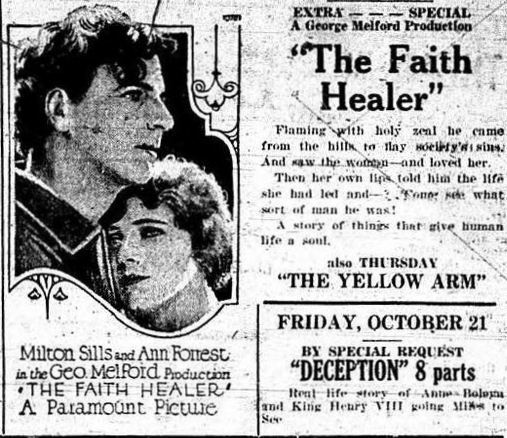
- Newspaper ad for film with Milton Sills and Ann Forrest
- Directed by: George Melford
- Screenplay by: Z. Wall Covington; Mrs. William Vaughn Moody; William Vaughn Moody (play)
- Starring: Milton Sills; Ann Forrest; Fontaine La Rue; Frederick Vroom; Loyola O'Connor; Mae Giraci; John Curry
- Cinematography: Harry Perry
- Production company: Famous Players–Lasky Corporation
- Distributed by: Paramount Pictures
- Release date: March 13, 1921
- Running time: 70 minutes
- Country: United States
- Language: Silent (English intertitles)

The Faith Healer is a lost 1921 American silent drama film directed by George Melford and written by Z. Wall Covington and Mrs. William Vaughn Moody from William Vaughn Moody's play. The film stars Milton Sills, Ann Forrest, Fontaine La Rue, Frederick Vroom, Loyola O'Connor, Mae Giraci, and John Curry. The film was released on March 13, 1921, by Paramount Pictures.

== Plot ==
Rhoda Williams is an orphan and the mistress of Dr. Littlefield. She sees a disabled man restored to good health by Michaelis a young shepherd with the power of faith healing. She summons Michaelis to her disabled aunt's house, he cures the woman of her paralysis problem, and Rhoda tells him of her difficult life. After that, Michaelis falls in love with her. Later, he is called to cure a woman's sick baby, but he fails to do that. He thinks that his power loss is a result of his love for Rhoda. In the end, she helps him see that the failure was only because of his lack of faith in the power of love. After he realizes that, he is able to restore the young child to full health.

== Cast ==
- Milton Sills as Michaelis
- Ann Forrest as Rhoda Williams
- Fontaine La Rue as Mary Beeler
- Frederick Vroom as Matthew Beeler
- Loyola O'Connor as Martha Beeler
- Mae Giraci as Little Annie
- John Curry as Uncle Abe
- Adolphe Menjou as Dr. Littlefield
- Edward Vroom as Dr. Sanchez
- Robert Brower as Dr. Martin
- Winifred Greenwood as A Mother
