= Heart Trouble (film) =

1928 film by Harry Langdon

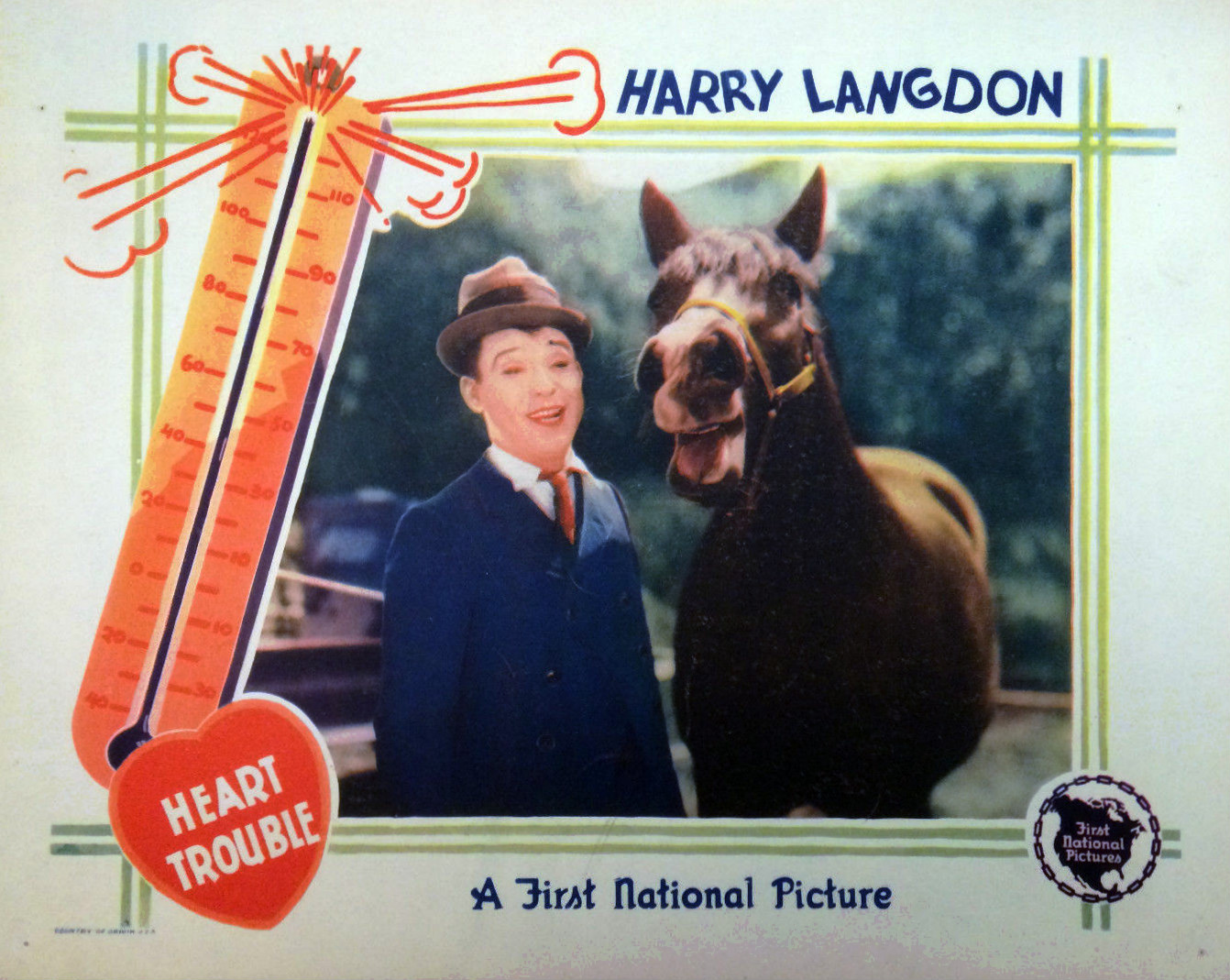
- Lobby card
- Directed by: Harry Langdon; Arthur Ripley (uncredited)
- Written by: Gardner Bradford (titles); Clarence Hennecke; Harry Langdon; Earle Rodney
- Story by: Arthur Ripley
- Starring: Harry Langdon; Doris Dawson
- Cinematography: Frank Evans; Dev Jennings
- Edited by: Alfred DeGaetano
- Production company: Harry Langdon Corporation
- Distributed by: First National Pictures
- Release date: August 12, 1928
- Running time: 6 reels
- Country: United States
- Language: Silent (English intertitles)

Heart Trouble is a 1928 American silent comedy film starring Harry Langdon and Doris Dawson. It is Langdon's final silent film. First National Pictures was preparing to fire Langdon. Reportedly less than a hundred prints were made and it went into only limited release, even though the reviews were good. It is presumed to be lost.

== Plot ==
A young man tries to enlist in the United States Army for World War I, but is rejected as physically unfit.

== Cast ==
- Harry Langdon as Harry Van Housen
- Doris Dawson as The Girl
- Lionel Belmore as Adolph Van Housen
- Madge Hunt as Mrs. Adolph Van Housen
- Bud Jamison as Contractor
- Mark Hamilton as Conductor
- Nelson McDowell as Conductor
- Edythe Chapman
- Clark Comstock
- Jack Pratt as Army Captain
- Bob Reeves
- Kid Wagner
