= Hugh Fay =

American actor and director (1882–1925)

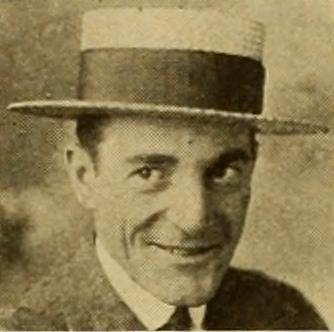
- Fay c. 1917
- Born: July 9, 1882; New York City, New York, U.S.
- Died: December 4, 1925 (aged 43); Los Angeles, California, U.S.
- Occupations: Actor; film director
- Years active: 1915–1925
- Relatives: Elfie Fay (sister)

Hugh Fay (June 9, 1882 – December 4, 1925) was an American comedic actor and film director. He appeared in vaudeville and silent films.

He was the son of Irish vaudevillian Henry "Hugh" Fay. The comedic actress Elfie Fay was his sister.

== Filmography ==
=== Actor ===
- Crooked to the End (1915)
- A Hash House Fraud (1915)
- Mabel Lost and Won (1915) as the vamp's friend
- An Oily Scoundrel (1916)
- Her Donkey Love (1917)
- A Matrimonial Accident (1917)
- Stars and Bars (1917)
- Son of a Gun (1918)
- Are Married Policemen Safe? (1918)
- A Neighbor's Keyhole (1918)
- The Failed Marriage (1918)
- A Lady Bellhop's Secret (1919)
- Better Times (1919) as Jack Ransom
- Almost Married) (1919) as Manny Morrison
- A Favor to a Friend (1919) as Danny Abbott
- Please Get Married (1919) as Soapy Higgins
- Hired and Fired (1920)
- A Kick in the High Life (1920)
- Little Annie Rooney (1925) as Spider
- Spuds (1927) as Spy

=== Director ===
- Won By a Foot (1917)
- The Rainmaker (1922)
- Glad Rags (1922)
- It's a Gift (1923)
- Tour Service (1926)
