= Not a Drum Was Heard =

1924 film

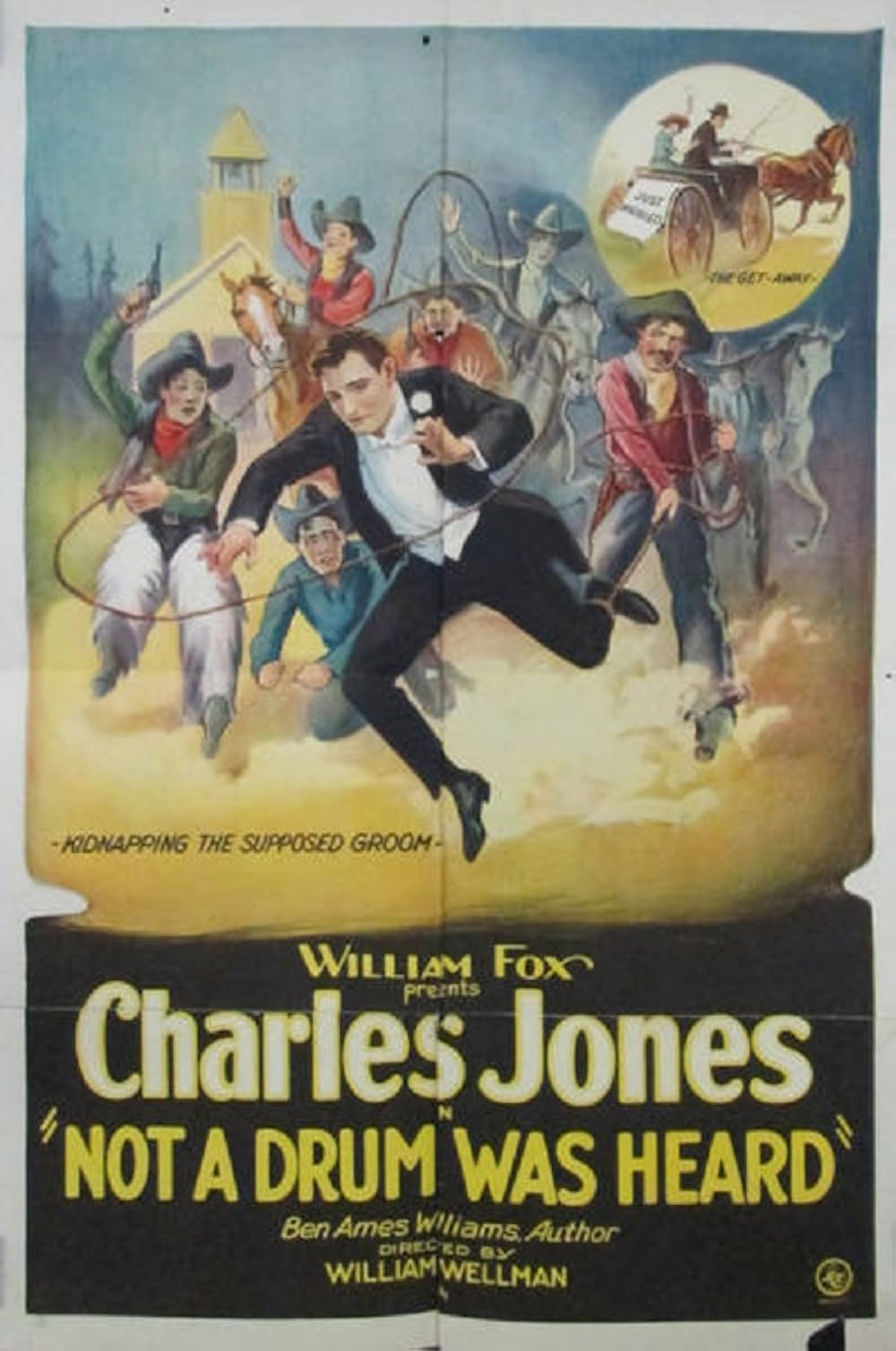
- Directed by: William Wellman
- Written by: Doty Hobart
- Story by: Ben Ames Williams
- Produced by: William Fox
- Starring: Buck Jones
- Cinematography: Joseph H. August
- Edited by: Harry Marker
- Distributed by: Fox Film Corporation
- Release date: January 27, 1924
- Running time: 50 minutes
- Country: United States
- Language: Silent (English intertitles)

Not a Drum Was Heard is a 1924 American silent Western film directed by William A. Wellman. The title is taken from the first line of Charles Wolfe's poem "The Burial of Sir John Moore after Corunna":

Not a drum was heard, not a funeral note,
As his corse{sic} to the rampart we hurried;
Not a soldier discharged his farewell shot
O'er the grave where our hero we buried.

== Plot ==
As described in a film magazine review, Jack Mills and Bud Loupel; they ride the ranch together, rescue each other from certain death, and fall in love with Jean Ross. She selects Bud to be the lucky one. Married life starts in a bungalow acquired on the installment plan from the town banker Rand, who also had courted Jean. Bud obtains employment at the bank as a teller. He falls into a trap set by Rand and steals funds. Jack hears of it, stages a holdup to cover the money, and tries to assume all blame. However, Bud has been mortally wounded and, in the mix-up, exonerates his friend before he dies.

== Cast ==
- Buck Jones as Jack Mills (credited as Charles Jones)
- Betty Bouton as Jean Ross
- Frank Campeau as Banker Rand
- Rhody Hathaway as James Ross
- Al Fremont as The Sheriff
- William Scott as Bud Loupel
- Mickey McBan as Jack Loupel Jr.

== Preservation ==
With no prints of Not a Drum Was Heard in any film archives, it is a lost film.
