= You Can't Get Away with It =

1923 film

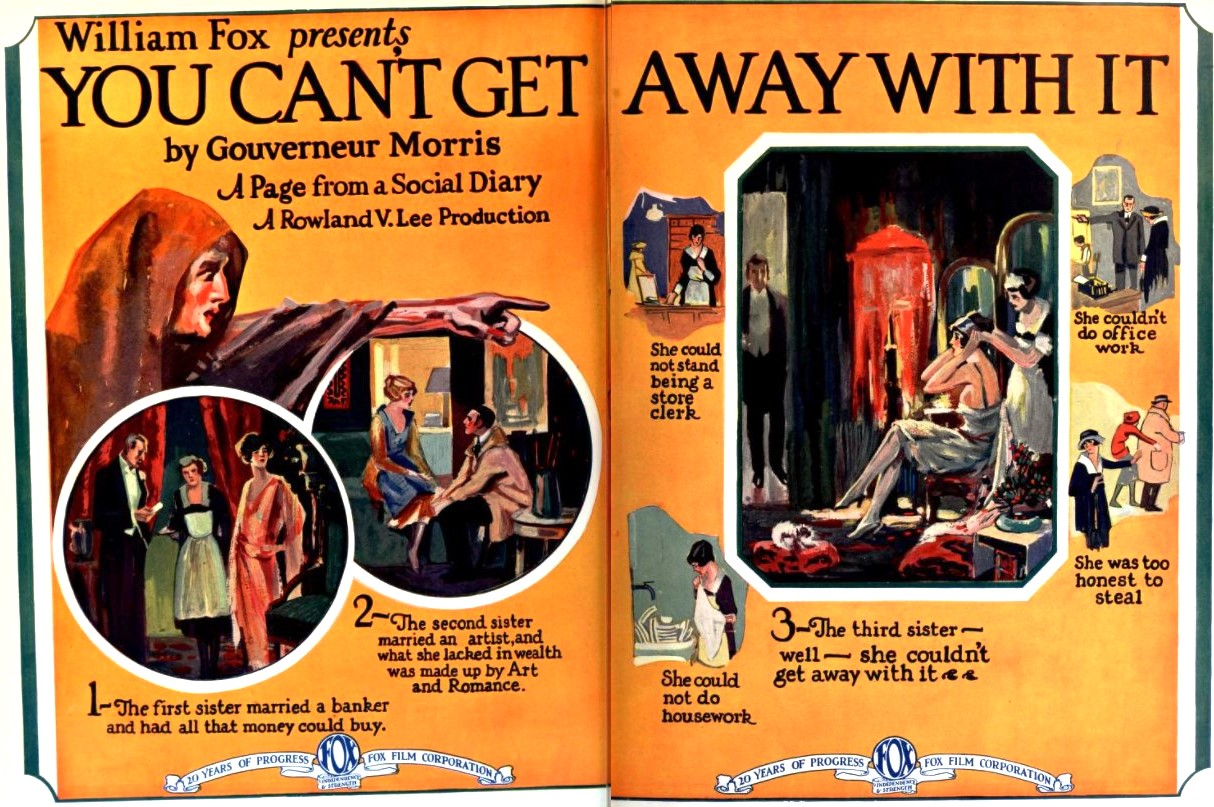
- Advertisement
- Directed by: Rowland V. Lee
- Written by: Robert N. Lee; Gouverneur Morris
- Produced by: William Fox
- Starring: Percy Marmont; Malcolm McGregor; Betty Bouton
- Cinematography: G.O. Post
- Production company: Fox Film Corporation
- Distributed by: Fox Film Corporation
- Release date: December 9, 1923
- Running time: 6 reels
- Country: United States
- Language: Silent (English intertitles)

You Can't Get Away with It is a 1923 American silent romantic drama film directed by Rowland V. Lee and starring Percy Marmont, Malcolm McGregor, and Betty Bouton.

== Plot ==
As described in a film magazine review, Jill, Jane, and May Mackie are left penniless when their father dies. They obtain employment but department store work breaks down Jill's health. Charles Hemingway, cursed with a selfish, unsympathetic wife, grows fond of Jill and she goes to live with him. Later, he dies and she has an opportunity to marry Henry Adams. Facing exposure, she confesses her past. He discards her and she returns to work as a store clerk, convinced that there is no escape from the penalties of doing wrong.

== Cast ==
- Percy Marmont as Charles Hemingway
- Malcolm McGregor as Henry Adams
- Betty Bouton as Jill Mackie
- Barbara Tennant as Jane Mackie
- Grace Morse as May Mackie
- Clarissa Selwynne as Mrs. Hemingway
- Charles Cruz as Charles Hemingway Jr.

== Production ==
You Can't Get Away With It was partially filmed on location at Santa Barbara, California.

== Preservation ==
With no prints of You Can't Get Away with It located in any film archives, it is a lost film.

== Bibliography ==
- Solomon, Aubrey. The Fox Film Corporation, 1915-1935: A History and Filmography. McFarland, 2011.
