= Humphrey Pearson =

American screenwriter and playwright

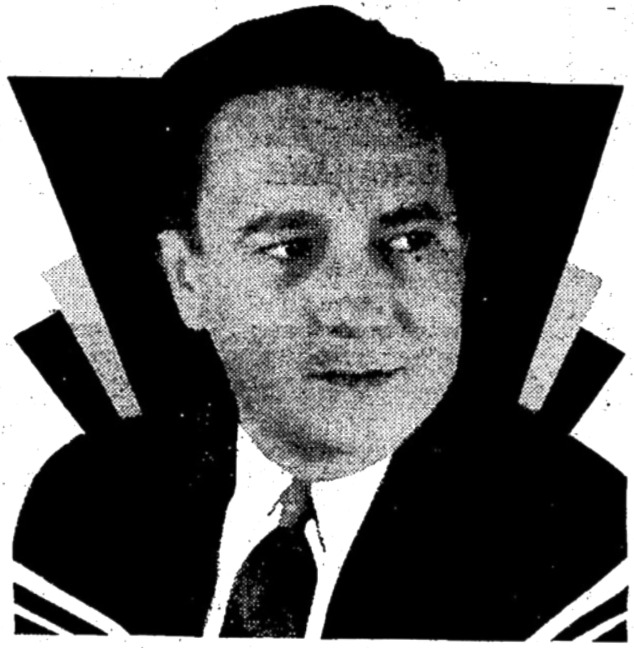
- From a 1930 magazine
- Born: November 30, 1893; Columbus, Ohio, United States
- Died: February 24, 1937 (aged 43); Hollywood, California, United States
- Occupations: Screenwriter, playwright
- Years active: 1929–36
- Spouse: Rive King Pearson

Humphrey Pearson (November 30, 1893 – February 24, 1937) was an American screenwriter and playwright of the 1930s. During his brief career, he penned a Broadway play and 22 screenplays. His promising career was cut short when he was found shot to death, under mysterious circumstances in his home, in early 1937.

== Life and career ==
Pearson was born on November 30, 1893, in Columbus, Ohio. He would break into the film industry in 1929, writing the dialogue and titles to Mervyn LeRoy's Hot Stuff, which was one of the few films Hollywood produced which was a silent film with sound sequences. Pearson's play, Shoestring, would serve as the basis for Robert Lord's screenplay On With the Show!, which in 1929 became the first color sound film.

In the next two years Pearson would pen another seven screenplays, including Bride of the Regiment, starring Vivienne Segal and Allan Prior, and featuring Walter Pidgeon and Myrna Loy; Michael Curtiz' Bright Lights (1930); Going Wild, starring Joe E. Brown, and Walter Pidgeon; and another Mervyn Leroy film, Top Speed, again starring Joe E. Brown. 1930 would also see Pearson's play, They Never Grow Up, be produced. It would be the only play written by Pearson produced on Broadway, having a short run at the Theatre Masque, lasting for 24 performances. Its cast included Florence Auer, and Otto Kruger.

Between 1931 and 1936 Pearson would be responsible for another fourteen screenplays. These would include Consolation Marriage, with Irene Dunne and Pat O'Brien; George Archainbaud's The Lost Squadron, starring Richard Dix, Mary Astor, Robert Armstrong, Joel McCrea, and Erich von Stroheim; Westward Passage, starring Ann Harding, Laurence Olivier, and ZaSu Pitts; Face in the Sky, starring Spencer Tracy; 1935's Ruggles of Red Gap, which stars Charles Laughton, Mary Boland, Charlie Ruggles, ZaSu Pitts, Roland Young, and Leila Hyams, which The Film Daily rated one of the ten best films of 1935; and Red Salute, starring Barbara Stanwyck.

Pearson's last screenplay was 1936's Palm Springs. In February 1937, after a night of drinking, Pearson was killed by a gunshot wound to the chest at his home in Palm Springs, California. His death occurred under mysterious circumstances. Initially, it was not clear whether the death was a suicide or at the hand of his wife, Rive King Pearson, but eventually the Palm Springs chief of police ruled it accidental.
