= The Bedroom Window (1924 film) =

1924 film by William C. deMille

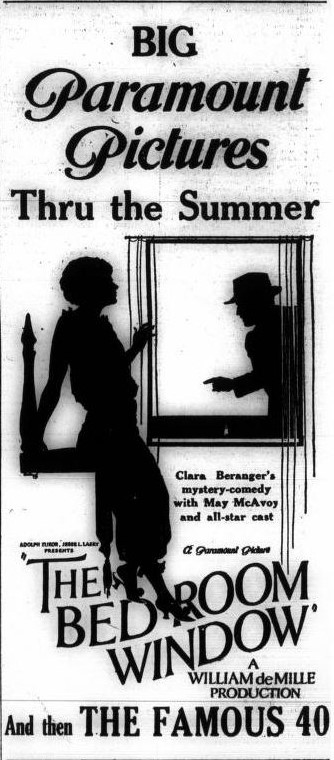
- Advertisement
- Directed by: William C. deMille
- Written by: Clara Beranger (story & scenario)
- Produced by: Adolph Zukor; Jesse L. Lasky
- Starring: May McAvoy; Malcolm McGregor
- Cinematography: L. Guy Wilky
- Distributed by: Paramount Pictures
- Release date: June 15, 1924
- Running time: 70 minutes; 7 reels
- Country: United States
- Language: Silent (English intertitles)

The Bedroom Window is a 1924 American silent mystery film directed by William C. deMille and starring May McAvoy. It was produced by Famous Players–Lasky and distributed through Paramount Pictures.

== Cast ==
- May McAvoy as Ruth Martin
- Malcolm McGregor as Frank Armstrong
- Ricardo Cortez as Robert Delano
- Robert Edeson as Frederick Hall
- George Fawcett as Silas Tucker
- Ethel Wales as Matilda Jones
- Charles Ogle as Butler
- Medea Radzina as Sonya Malisoff
- Guy Oliver as Detective
- George Calliga as Gun Salesman (uncredited)
- Lillian Leighton as Mammy (uncredited)
- Mattie Peters (uncredited)

== Preservation ==
The film still exists and preserved at the Library of Congress and the UCLA Film & Television Archive.
