= Mickey Moore =

Child actor and film director (1914–2013)

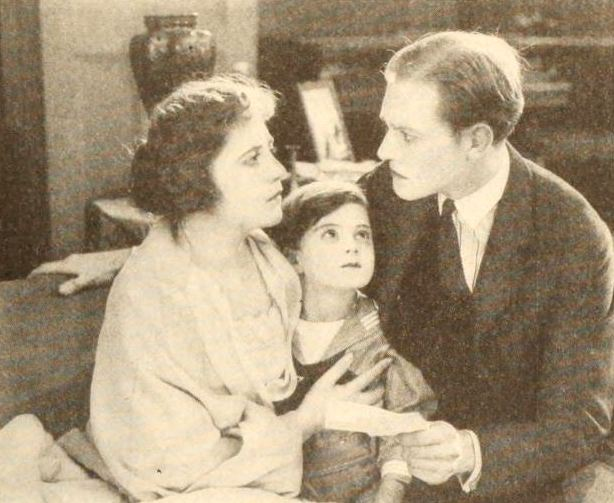
- Moore (center) with Lois Wilson and Conrad Nagel in The Lost Romance (1921)
- Born: Dennis Michael Sheffield; October 14, 1914; Vancouver, British Columbia, Canada
- Died: March 4, 2013 (aged 98); Malibu, California, U.S.
- Other names: Micky Moore; Michael Moore; Michael D. Moore
- Occupations: Actor; director
- Years active: 1919–2007
- Spouses: Esther McNeil (m. 1933; died 1992) Laurie Abdo (m. 1997; died 2011)
- Children: 2 daughters; 5 grandsons; 4 great-grandchildren

Mickey Moore (born Dennis Michael Sheffield, October 14, 1914 – March 4, 2013) was a Canadian-born American film director, second unit director, and child actor. He was credited as Michael Moore on all the films and television projects that he directed, and on most of the films on which he was second unit director.

== Life and career ==
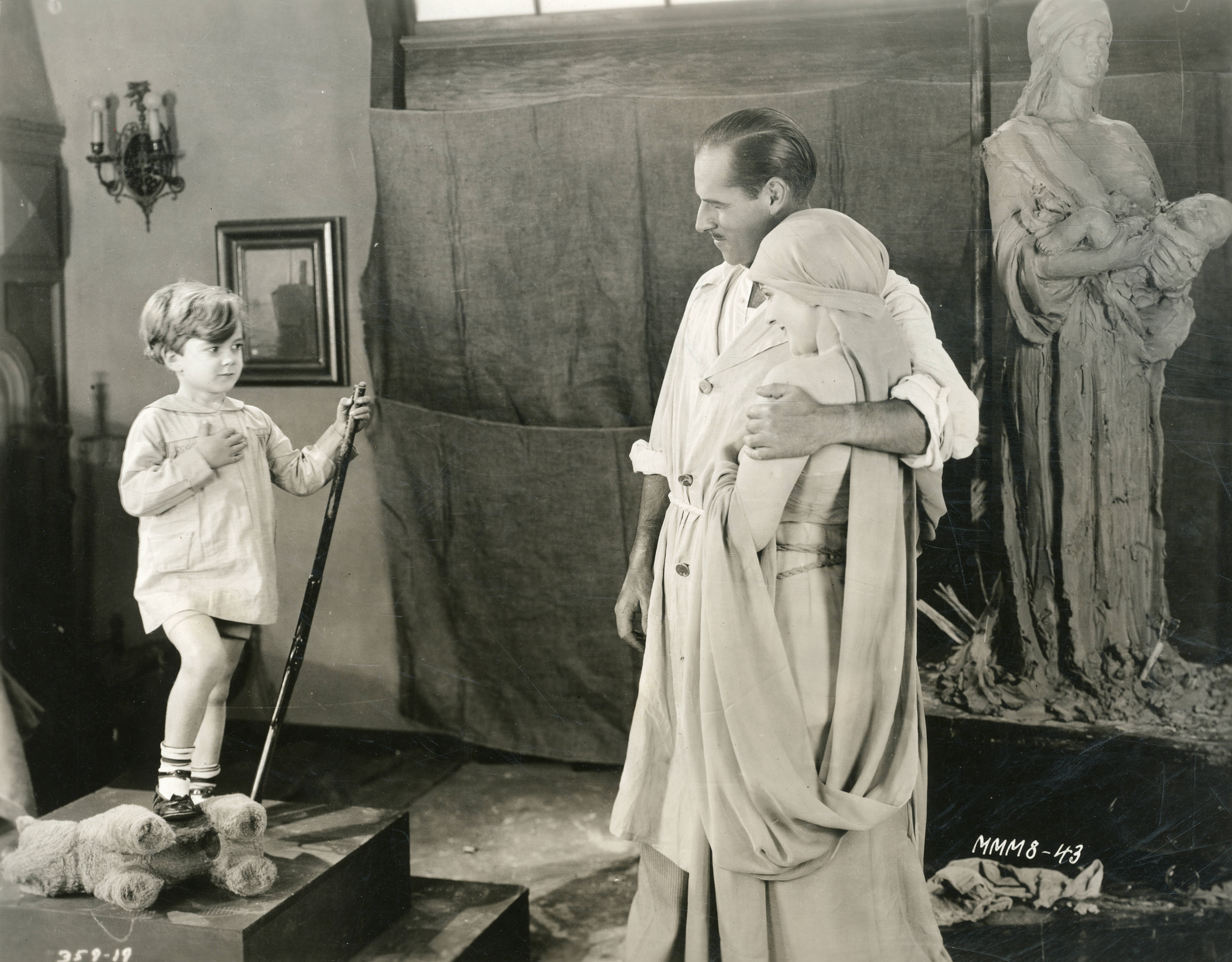
Mickey Moore, Jack Holt and Mary Miles Minter in All Soul's Eve (1921)

Dennis Michael Sheffield was born in Vancouver, British Columbia, the son of Thomas William Sheffield, a British marine engineer, and his wife, Norah Moore Sheffield, an actress from Dublin. He and his brother Patrick were Hollywood silent film child actors. At the age of five he appeared in his first film under the stage name "Mickey Moore", chosen because their mother "decided that the boys should work under her maiden name of Moore." He appeared in two dozen films, including The Dramatic Life of Abraham Lincoln (1924) and The King of Kings (1927), until 1927 when he was 13.

In the early 1950s, Moore began working as an assistant director. He was first A.D. on dozens of major motion pictures including The Ten Commandments (1956), and Gunfight at the O.K. Corral (1957). He was an assistant director on several Elvis Presley musical films and directed Presley in the film Paradise, Hawaiian Style (1966) for Paramount Pictures. Because of that, plus his experience directing a western film, Metro-Goldwyn-Mayer hired him to direct rock and roll singer Roy Orbison in The Fastest Guitar Alive (1967). He worked exclusively as a director in film and television from 1965 to 1969.

He then became a second unit director, working on numerous major films such as Butch Cassidy and the Sundance Kid (1969), Patton (1970), and The Man Who Would Be King (1975). He was credited as associate producer in charge of action and animal scenes for Quest for Fire (1981). In the 1980s, Steven Spielberg hired Moore as second unit director on Raiders of the Lost Ark, Indiana Jones and the Temple of Doom, and Indiana Jones and the Last Crusade. His association with Spielberg led him to direct the "Alamo Jobe" episode of the Amazing Stories television series. Moore was still active as a second unit director into his eighties. His last work was for Disney's 2000 film, 102 Dalmatians.

Moore attended Venice High School in the 1930s where he played football. He married high school sweetheart Esther McNeil in 1933 and had two daughters, Sandra Kastendiek-Drake (born 1936) and Patricia Newman (born 1937). McNeil died in 1992 and Moore married Laurie Abdo, formerly a personal assistant of Paramount producer Howard W. Koch, five years later; Abdo died in 2011.

== Death ==
Moore died of congestive heart failure at the age of 98 in Malibu, California on March 4, 2013.

== Filmography ==
=== As director ===
- Bonanza (1959, TV, 1 episode)
- Paradise, Hawaiian Style (1966)
- An Eye for an Eye (1966)
- Fastest Guitar Alive (1967)
- Kill a Dragon (1967)
- Hondo (1967, TV, 4 episodes)
- Please Don't Eat the Daisies (1967, TV, 1 episode)
- Buckskin (1968)
- Mister Deathman (1983)
- Amazing Stories (1985, TV, 1 episode)

=== As second unit director ===
Year	Title	Director
1969	Butch Cassidy and the Sundance Kid	George Roy Hill
1969	How to Commit Marriage	Norman Panama
1970	Patton	Franklin J. Schaffner
1971	Sometimes a Great Notion	Paul Newman
1973	Emperor of the North	Robert Aldrich
1973	Badge 373	Howard W. Koch
1974	Mame	Gene Saks
1975	Rooster Cogburn	Stuart Millar
1975	The Man Who Would Be King	John Huston
1976	The Missouri Breaks	Arthur Penn
1976	The Return of a Man Called Horse	Irvin Kershner
1977	Airport '77	Jerry Jameson
1977	Damnation Alley	Jack Smight
1980	Raise the Titanic	Jerry Jameson
1981	Raiders of the Lost Ark	Steven Spielberg
1981	Zorro: The Gay Blade	Peter Medak
1982	Six Pack	Daniel Petrie
1983	Never Say Never Again	Irvin Kershner
1984	Indiana Jones and the Temple of Doom	Steven Spielberg
1984	The Little Drummer Girl	George Roy Hill
1985	Sylvester	Tim Hunter
1985	National Lampoon's European Vacation	Amy Heckerling
1987	Outrageous Fortune	Arthur Hiller
1987	Ishtar	Elaine May
1988	Willow	Ron Howard
1988	Funny Farm	George Roy Hill
1988	Le palanquin des larmes	Jacques Dorfmann
1989	Indiana Jones and the Last Crusade	Steven Spielberg
1989	Ghostbusters II	Ivan Reitman
1991	Toy Soldiers	Daniel Petrie Jr.
1992	The Mighty Ducks	Stephen Herek
1992	Chaplin	Richard Attenborough
1993	Teenage Mutant Ninja Turtles III	Stuart Gillard
1993	Cool Runnings	Jon Turteltaub
1993	The Three Musketeers	Stephen Herek
1994	Little Giants	Duwayne Dunham
1996	101 Dalmatians	Stephen Herek
1997	Flubber	Les Mayfield
1998	Wrongfully Accused	Pat Proft
2000	102 Dalmatians	Kevin Lima

== Bibliography ==
- Holmstrom, John. The Moving Picture Boy: An International Encyclopaedia from 1895 to 1995, Norwich, Michael Russell, 1996, pp. 73–74.
