= List of Pathé Exchange films =

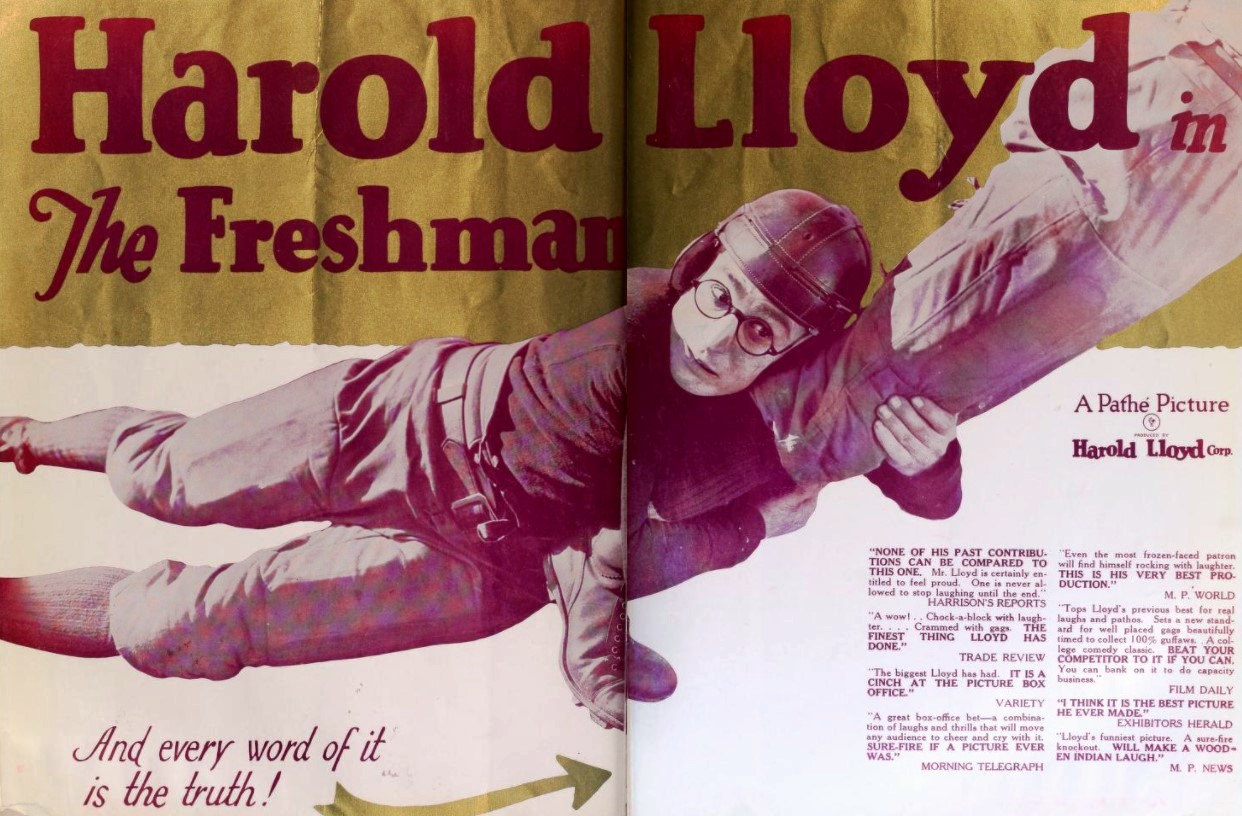
Advertisement for The Freshman (1925), last of the Harold Lloyd features released by Pathé Exchange. Lloyd's production company was one of the many independent firms whose films were distributed by Pathé.

Pathé Exchange, commonly known as Pathé, was an American film production and distribution company, largely of Hollywood's silent era. Known for its groundbreaking newsreel and wide array of shorts, it grew out of the American division of the major French studio Pathé Frères, which began distributing films in the United States in 1904. Ten years later, it produced the enormously successful The Perils of Pauline, a twenty-episode serial that came to define the genre. The American operation was incorporated as Pathé Exchange toward the end of 1914 and spun off as an independent entity in 1921. The following year, it released Robert J. Flaherty's influential documentary Nanook of the North. Other notable feature releases included the controversial drama Sex (1920) and director/producer Cecil B. DeMille's smash-hit biblical epic The King of Kings (1927). For much of the 1920s, Pathé distributed the shorts of comedy pioneers Hal Roach and Mack Sennett and innovative animator Paul Terry. Famed comedian Harold Lloyd starred under the Pathé banner in both shorts and features for Roach and then in three features for his own production company.

In late 1926, investment banker Elisha Walker acquired control of the studio through his Blair & Co. firm, subsequently bringing in financier and Hollywood maestro Joseph P. Kennedy as a co-owner and managing director. Finally, in January 1931, most of its assets, including its motion picture production facilities, employee contracts, and distribution exchanges, were acquired by the major RKO Pictures studio, which established a semiautonomous, short-lived RKO Pathé division. (Four films completed by Pathé Exchange, two already in release, also became RKO properties.) While Pathé Exchange continued to exist as a holding company for minor assets not included in the sale, it was no longer a film production or distribution company.

== Filmography ==
=== 1910s ===
| Title | Status |
|---|---|
| Excuse Me (1915) | extant |
| The Greater Will (1915) | lost |
| Via Wireless (1915) | extant |
| Arms and the Woman (1916) | lost |
| The Romantic Journey (1916) | lost |
| The Test (1916) | extant |
| Big Jim Garrity (1916) | extant |
| Patria (1917) | incomplete |
| Sylvia of the Secret Service (1917) | lost |
| The Angel Factory (1917) | incomplete |
| The Little Patriot (1917) | lost |
| Runaway Romany (1917) | lost |
| Vengeance Is Mine (1917) | lost |
| Over the Hill (1917) | lost |
| Her New York (1917) | lost |
| Kick In (1917) | lost |
| The Image Maker (1917) | lost |
| Twin Kiddies (1917) | extant |
| Eye for an Eye (1917) | extant |
| Sold at Auction (1917) | lost |
| Her Life and His (1917) | lost |
| The Vicar of Wakefield (1917) | extant |
| Crime and Punishment (1917) | lost |
| Her Beloved Enemy (1917) | lost |
| The Empress (1917) | extant |
| Told at Twilight (1917) | extant |
| Mary Lawson's Secret (1917) | lost |
| When Love Was Blind (1917) | lost |
| Sunshine and Gold (1917) | extant |
| The Neglected Wife (1917) | incomplete |
| The Recoil (1917) | incomplete |
| The Candy Girl (1917) | lost |
| The Iron Heart (1917) | lost |
| An Amateur Orphan (1917) | lost |
| Blind Man's Luck (1917) | lost |
| The Fires of Youth (1917) | extant |
| The Woman in White (1917) | extant |
| The Fatal Ring (1917) | unclear |
| The Cigarette Girl (1917) | extant |
| It Happened to Adele (1917) | unclear |
| The Last of the Carnabys (1917) | lost |
| The Mad Lover (1917) | lost |
| The On-the-Square Girl (1917) | lost |
| The Streets of Illusion (1917) | extant |
| Miss Nobody (1917) | extant |
| Tears and Smiles (1917) | lost |
| War and the Woman (1917) | extant |
| Under False Colors (1917) | lost |
| A Crooked Romance (1917) | lost |
| Stranded in Arcady (1917) | extant |
| The Heart of Ezra Greer (1917) | lost |
| The Mark of Cain (1917) | extant |
| Convict 993 (1918) | lost |
| Innocent (1918) | lost |
| The Other Woman (1918) | lost |
| Loaded Dice (1918) | lost |
| The Naulahka (1918) | extant |
| Daddy's Girl (1918) | lost |
| The Great Adventure (1918) | extant |
| The House of Hate (1918) | incomplete |
| The Hillcrest Mystery (1918) | lost |
| Mrs. Slacker (1918) | extant |
| Ruler of the Road (1918) | extant |
| How Could You, Caroline? (1918) | lost |
| The Mysterious Client (1918) | lost |
| More Trouble (1918) | lost |
| The Yellow Ticket (1918) | lost |
| A Daughter of the West (1918) | lost |
| For Sale (1918) | lost |
| Kidder and Ko (1918) | lost |
| The Voice of Destiny (1918) | incomplete |
| A Little Sister of Everybody (1918) | lost |
| Annexing Bill (1918) | lost |
| The Ghost of Rosy Taylor (1918) | extant |
| The First Law (1918) | extant |
| Waifs (1918) | incomplete |
| Ghost of the Rancho (1918) | incomplete |
| Hands Up (1918) | lost |
| The Eyes of Julia Deep (1918) | extant |
| Her Man (1918) | extant |
| The Bells (1918) | lost |
| A Japanese Nightingale (1918) | extant |
| Money Isn't Everything (1918) | lost |
| Border Raiders (1918) | extant |
| Hobbs in a Hurry (1918) | lost |
| Rosemary Climbs the Heights (1918) | unclear |
| All the World to Nothing (1918) | lost |
| Wives and Other Wives (1918) | lost |
| The Narrow Path (1918) | lost |
| Two-Gun Betty (1918) | lost |
| Fair Enough (1918) | lost |
| The Drifters (1919) | lost |
| The Midnight Stage (1919) | extant |
| The Lightning Raider (1919) | incomplete |
| When a Man Rides Alone (1919) | lost |
| Fighting Through (1919) | lost |
| The Amazing Impostor (1919) | lost |
| Terror of the Range (1919) | lost |
| Todd of the Times (1919) | lost |
| Come Again Smith (1919) | lost |
| Molly of the Follies (1919) | lost |
| Common Clay (1919) | lost |
| Where the West Begins (1919) | extant |
| Carolyn of the Corners (1919) | lost |
| The Forfeit (1919) | lost |
| The Little Diplomat (1919) | lost |
| The Twin Pawns (1919) | extant |
| The End of the Game (1919) | extant |
| Brass Buttons (1919) | extant |
| Thunderbolts of Fate (1919) | extant |
| The Silver Girl (1919) | incomplete |
| Gates of Brass (1919) | lost |
| The Intrusion of Isabel (1919) | lost |
| As a Man Thinks (1919) | lost |
| The Tiger's Trail (1919) | fragment |
| Unknown Love (1919) | extant |
| The Best Man (1919) | lost |
| The Cry of the Weak (1919) | lost |
| Charge It to Me (1919) | lost |
| Some Liar (1919) | lost |
| All Wrong (1919) | lost |
| A Bachelor's Wife (1919) | lost |
| The Bishop's Emeralds (1919) | lost |
| Trixie from Broadway (1919) | lost |
| A Sporting Chance (1919) | extant |
| Oh, Boy! (1919) | extant |
| The Profiteers (1919) | lost |
| Sahara (1919) | extant |
| Yvonne from Paris (1919) | lost |
| Our Better Selves (1919) | lost |
| The Tiger Lily (1919) | lost |
| The Blue Bonnet (1919) | lost |
| A White Man's Chance (1919) | lost |
| The Westerners (1919) | lost |
| This Hero Stuff (1919) | lost |
| The World Aflame (1919) | lost |
| The Thirteenth Chair (1919) | lost |
| The Love Cheat (1919) | lost |
| Six Feet Four (1919) | extant |
| The Virtuous Model (1919) | extant |
| The False Code (1919) | fragment |
| Impossible Catherine (1919) | extant |
| A Damsel in Distress (1919) | incomplete |
| The Moonshine Trail (1919) | lost |
| Bound and Gagged (1919) | incomplete |
| The Hellion (1919) | lost |
| The Black Secret (1919) | extant |
| A Woman of Pleasure (1919) | lost |
| You Never Know Your Luck (1919) | extant |
| The Bandbox (1919) | lost |
| Fighting Cressy (1919) | lost |
| The Right to Lie (1919) | extant |
| Desert Gold (1919) | lost |
| Dawn (1919) | lost |
| Brothers Divided (1919) | lost |
| The A.B.C. of Love (1919) | extant |
| The Lord Loves the Irish (1919) | extant |
| The Lone Wolf's Daughter (1919) | extant |
| The Prince and Betty (1919) | lost |
| The Adventures of Ruth (1919) | lost |
| The Capitol (1919) | extant |
| Eve in Exile (1919) | extant |
| The Joyous Liar (1919) | lost |

=== 1920s ===
| Title | Status |
|---|---|
| My Husband's Other Wife (1920) | lost |
| The Web of Deceit (1920) | extant |
| Sex (1920) | extant |
| Live Sparks (1920) | lost |
| The Sagebrusher (1920) | lost |
| Other Men's Shoes (1920) | extant |
| Daredevil Jack (1920) | incomplete |
| Respectable by Proxy (1920) | lost |
| The Valley of Tomorrow (1920) | lost |
| Smoldering Embers (1920) | lost |
| In Walked Mary (1920) | extant |
| The Dangerous Talent (1920) | lost |
| Tarnished Reputations (1920) | lost |
| The Deadlier Sex (1920) | extant |
| Lifting Shadows (1920) | extant |
| Trailed by Three (1920) | lost |
| The Blood Barrier (1920) | lost |
| The Harvest Moon (1920) | lost |
| Rio Grande (1920) | lost |
| The Honey Bee (1920) | lost |
| Riders of the Dawn (1920) | lost |
| Dollar for Dollar (1920) | extant |
| The Thirtieth Piece of Silver (1920) | lost |
| Simple Souls (1920) | lost |
| The Third Eye (1920) | lost |
| Number 99 (1920) | lost |
| The House of Toys (1920) | lost |
| Passers By (1920) | extant |
| A Broadway Cowboy (1920) | extant |
| One Hour Before Dawn (1920) | extant |
| The Green Flame (1920) | lost |
| Man and His Woman (1920) | lost |
| The Silent Barrier (1920) | lost |
| The Week-End (1920) | lost |
| The Girl in the Web (1920) | lost |
| Lahoma (1920) | lost |
| Pirate Gold (1920) | lost |
| Love Madness (1920) | extant |
| Ruth of the Rockies (1920) | incomplete |
| The House of the Tolling Bell (1920) | lost |
| The Dwelling Place of Light (1920) | lost |
| Felix O'Day (1920) | lost |
| Help Wanted - Male (1920) | lost |
| The Kentucky Colonel (1920) | lost |
| A Light Woman (1920) | lost |
| The Riddle: Woman (1920) | lost |
| $30,000 (1920) | lost |
| The Forbidden Valley (1920) | lost |
| Half a Chance (1920) | lost |
| The House of Whispers (1920) | lost |
| The Money Changers (1920) | lost |
| The Blue Moon (1920) | lost |
| Her Unwilling Husband (1920) | lost |
| The Devil to Pay (1920) | lost |
| The Brute Master (1920) | extant |
| The U.P. Trail (1920) | lost |
| The Tiger's Coat (1920) | extant |
| The Gamesters (1920) | lost |
| Dice of Destiny (1920) | lost |
| The Empire of Diamonds (1920) | lost |
| The Broken Gate (1920) | lost |
| That Girl Montana (1921) | extant |
| What Women Will Do (1921) | lost |
| The Devil (1921) | extant |
| The Killer (1921) | lost |
| The Sage Hen (1921) | lost |
| The Spenders (1921) | lost |
| When We Were 21 (1921) | lost |
| Sunset Jones (1921) | lost |
| Payment Guaranteed (1921) | lost |
| The Lure of Egypt (1921) | lost |
| The Rider of the King Log (1921) | lost |
| The Heart Line (1921) | lost |
| The Butterfly Girl (1921) | lost |
| Without Benefit of Clergy (1921) | extant |
| The Yellow Arm (1921) | lost |
| The Money Maniac (1921) | lost |
| Their Mutual Child (1921) | lost |
| The Power Within (1921) | lost |
| The Honor of Rameriz (1921) (short) | lost |
| The Spirit of the Lake (1921) (short) | lost |
| The Heart of Doreon (1921) (short) | incomplete |
| Nanook of the North (1922) | extant |
| Lonesome Corners (1922) | lost |
| Safety Last! (1923) | extant |
| The Call of the Wild (1923) | extant |
| The Extra Girl (1923) | extant |
| The King of Wild Horses (1924) | extant |
| Girl Shy (1924) | extant |
| Battling Orioles (1924) | extant |
| Dynamite Smith (1924) | extant |
| Hot Water (1924) | extant |
| The White Sheep (1924) | extant |
| Battling Bunyan (1924) | extant |
| Barriers Burned Away (1925) | extant |
| Black Cyclone (1925) | extant |
| Bad Company (1925) | lost |
| Back to Life (1925) | lost |
| Percy (1925) | lost |
| Heir-Loons (1925) | lost |
| The Freshman (1925) | extant |
| North Star (1925) | lost |
| Lover's Island (1925) | lost |
| Stop, Look and Listen (1926) | incomplete |
| Pirates of the Sky (1926) | lost |
| Driftin' Thru (1926) | extant |
| The Seventh Bandit (1926) | fragment |
| The Frontier Trail (1926) | lost |
| The Little Firebrand (1926) | lost |
| The High Hand (1926) | lost |
| Atta Boy (1926) | extant |
| Raggedy Rose (1926) | extant |
| The Outlaw Express (1926) | lost |
| The Trunk Mystery (1926) | lost |
| The Devil Horse (1926) | extant |
| Satan Town (1926) | incomplete |
| The Long Loop on the Pecos (1926) | lost |
| Snowed In (serial) (1926) | lost |
| The Cyclone Cowboy (1927) | extant |
| Play Safe (1927) | extant |
| His First Flame (1927) | extant |
| Between Dangers (1927) | lost |
| The Galloping Gobs (1927) | extant |
| The Man from Hard Pan (1927) | lost |
| The Ridin' Rowdy (1927) | lost |
| The Princess on Broadway (1927) | incomplete |
| Tearin' Into Trouble (1927) | lost |
| The Arizona Whirlwind (1927) | extant |
| The Fightin' Comeback (1927) | lost |
| Spuds (1927) | extant |
| Horse Shoes (1927) | extant |
| The King of Kings (1927) | synchronized score Technicolor sequences extant |
| No Man's Law (1927) | extant |
| The Eyes of the Totem (1927) | extant |
| The Heart of the Yukon (1927) | lost |
| Don Desperado (1927) | extant |
| Avenging Fangs (1927) | lost |
| The Meddlin' Stranger (1927) | lost |
| Code of the Cow Country (1927) | lost |
| Pals in Peril (1927) | lost |
| Two-Gun of the Tumbleweed (1927) | extant |
| His Dog (1927) | extant |
| Skedaddle Gold (1927) | lost |
| Hidden Aces (1927) | extant |
| White Pebbles (1927) | lost |
| The Fighting Eagle (1927) | extant |
| The Phantom Buster (1927) | lost |
| Land of the Lawless (1927) | incomplete |
| The Interferin' Gent (1927) | lost |
| Roarin' Broncs (1927) | lost |
| The Girl from Everywhere (1927) | unclear |
| The Country Doctor (1927) | extant |
| Border Blackbirds (1927) | incomplete |
| Born to Battle (1927) | extant |
| The Soda Water Cowboy (1927) | lost |
| The Angel of Broadway (1927) | lost |
| Ride 'em High (1927) | incomplete |
| A Harp in Hock (1927) | lost |
| The Obligin' Buckaroo (1927) | incomplete |
| Combat (1927) | lost |
| The Wise Wife (1927) | lost |
| Dress Parade (1927) | extant |
| The Forbidden Woman (1927) | extant |
| The Main Event (1927) | extant |
| The Girl in the Pullman (1927) | extant |
| The Wreck of the Hesperus (1927) | extant |
| Turkish Delight (1927) | extant |
| Hoof Marks (1927) | extant |
| Burnt Fingers (1927) | lost |
| Gold from Weepah (1927) | lost |
| His Foreign Wife (1927) | lost |
| Flying Luck (1927) | extant |
| The Desert of the Lost (1927) | extant |
| My Friend from India (1927) | extant |
| Chicago (1927) | extant |
| Almost Human (1927) | extant |
| A Blonde for a Night (1928) | fragment |
| Midnight Madness (1928) | extant |
| Skyscraper (1928) | extant |
| The Cop (1928) | extant |
| Man-Made Women (1928) | extant |
| Power (1928) | extant |
| Hold 'Em Yale (1928) | extant |
| The Godless Girl (1928) | part-talkie extant |
| Captain Swagger (1928) | synchronized score extant |
| Desperate Courage (1928) | extant |
| Laddie Be Good (1928) | lost |
| The Valley of Hunted Men (1928) | extant |
| The Red Mark (1928) | extant |
| The Bronc Stomper (1928) | lost |
| Marlie the Killer (1928) | extant |
| The Avenging Shadow (1928) | extant |
| The Black Ace (1928) | extant |
| The Flyin' Buckaroo (1928) | lost |
| Fangs of Fate (1928) | lost |
| Let 'Er Go Gallegher (1928) | extant |
| Yellow Contraband (1928) | lost |
| Marked Money (1928) | synchronized score extant |
| Walking Back (1928) | extant |
| The Law's Lash (1928) | extant |
| Saddle Mates (1928) | extant |
| The Boss of Rustler's Roost (1928) | extant |
| The Apache Raider (1928) | lost |
| The Bullet Mark (1928) | lost |
| Stand and Deliver (1928) | extant |
| The Ballyhoo Buster (1928) | lost |
| The Border Patrol (1928) | extant |
| Crashing Through (1928) | lost |
| The Cowboy Cavalier (1928) | lost |
| The Spieler (1928) | part-talkie extant soundtrack lost |
| Ned McCobb's Daughter (1928) | synchronized score lost |
| Celebrity (1928) | extant |
| The Night Flyer (1928) | extant |
| The Leopard Lady (1928) | lost |
| Annapolis (1928) | synchronized score extant |
| The Shady Lady (1928) | part-talkie lost |
| Love Over Night (1928) | extant |
| A Perfect Gentleman (1928) | extant |
| Craig's Wife (1928) | lost |
| Tenth Avenue (1928) | lost |
| The Blue Danube (1928) | extant |
| On to Reno (1928) | extant |
| A Ship Comes In (1928) | extant |
| The Bride of the Colorado (1928) | unclear |
| What Price Beauty? (1928) | lost |
| Show Folks (1928) | part-talkie extant |
| The Rush Hour (1928) | extant |
| Sal of Singapore (1929) | part-talkie extant |
| Sin Town (1929) | lost |
| Geraldine (1929) | part-talkie extant |
| Noisy Neighbors (1929) | part-talkie lost |
| .45 Calibre War (1929) | lost |
| The Leatherneck (1929) | part-talkie extant |
| The Office Scandal (1929) | part-talkie extant |
| Square Shoulders (1929) | synchronized score extant |
| Hawk of the Hills (1929) | synchronized score extant |
| Strange Cargo (1929) | all-talking extant |
| Mother's Boy (1929) | all-talking extant |
| The Flying Fool (1929) | all-talking extant |
| High Voltage (1929) | all-talking extant |
| Paris Bound (1929) | all-talking extant |
| The Awful Truth (1929) | all-talking lost |
| Lucky in Love (1929) | all-talking lost |
| The Sophomore (1929) | all-talking silent version extant soundtrack discs extant |
| Big News (1929) | all-talking extant |
| Sailor's Holiday (1929) | all-talking extant |
| Her Private Affair (1929) | all-talking extant |
| Oh, Yeah! (1929) | all-talking extant |
| The Racketeer (1929) | all-talking extant |
| Red Hot Rhythm (1929) | all-talking Multicolor sequences color sequence extant |
| Rich People (1929) | all-talking extant |
| This Thing Called Love (1929) | all-talking Multicolor sequences lost |
| His First Command (1929) | all-talking Multicolor sequences extant |

=== 1930s ===
- The Grand Parade (1930) [lost]
- Officer O'Brien (1930)
- Swing High (1930)
- Holiday (1930)
- Night Work (1930)
- Her Man (1930)
- Pardon My Gun (1930)
- Big Money (1930)
- Sin Takes a Holiday (1930) [distribution shifted to RKO Pathé after sale]
- The Painted Desert (1931) [distribution shifted to RKO Pathé after sale]
- Lonely Wives (1931) [produced by Pathé Exchange; distributed by RKO Pathé]
- Beyond Victory (1931) [produced by Pathé Exchange; distributed by RKO Pathé]
