= The Merry Wives =

The Merry Wives may refer to:

- The Merry Wives (1938 film), a Czechoslovak historical comedy film, based on works by Ladislav Stroupežnický
- The Merry Wives (1936 film), a German comedy film, based on Shakespeare's The Merry Wives of Windsor

== See also ==
- The Merry Wives of Windsor (disambiguation)
