= Put Up Your Hands =

1919 American Comedy film directed by Edward Sloman

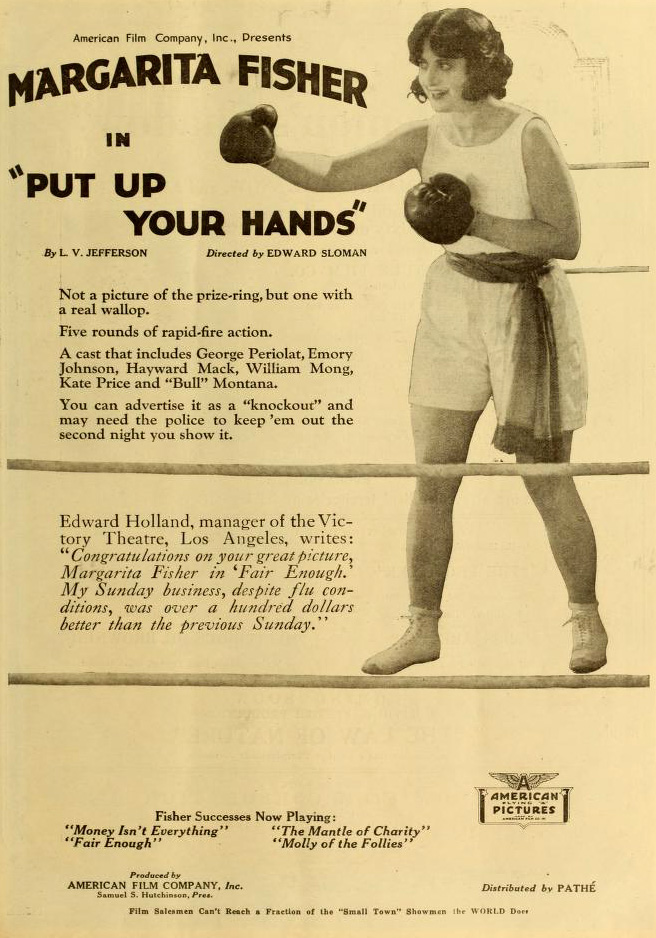
- Magazine advertisement
- Directed by: Edward Sloman
- Written by: L. V. Jefferson; Story, Screenplay
- Produced by: American Film
- Starring: Margarita Fischer
- Cinematography: Gilbert Warrenton
- Distributed by: Pathé Exchange
- Release date: March 16, 1919
- Running time: 5 reels
- Country: United States
- Language: Silent (English intertitles)

Put Up Your Hands is a 1919 American silent comedy film directed by Edward Sloman and written by L. V. Jefferson. The film stars Margarita Fischer, George Periolat, and Emory Johnson. The film was released on March 16, 1919, by Pathé Exchange.

== Cast ==
Actor	Role
Margarita Fischer	Olive Barton
George Periolat	Peter Barton
Emory Johnson	Emory Hewitt
Hayward Mack	Alvin Thorne
William V. Mong	'Highball' Hazelitt
J. Gordon Russell	Three Gun Smith
Kate Price	Bridget
Marian Lee	Undetermined Role
