= A Parisian Scandal =

1921 film directed by George L. Cox

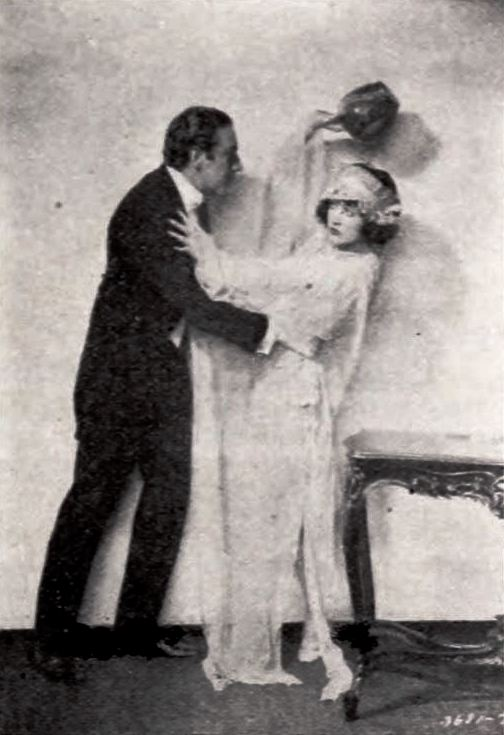
- Film still
- Directed by: George L. Cox
- Screenplay by: Doris Schroeder (scenario)
- Story by: Louise Winter
- Produced by: Carl Laemmle
- Starring: George Periolat; Lillian Lawrence; Marie Prevost
- Cinematography: William E. Fildew
- Edited by: Frank Lawrence
- Production company: Universal Film Manufacturing Co.
- Release date: December 5, 1921 (US)
- Running time: 5 reels
- Country: United States
- Language: Silent (English intertitles)

A Parisian Scandal is a 1921 American silent comedy-drama film, directed by George L. Cox. It stars George Periolat, Lillian Lawrence, and Marie Prevost, and was released on December 5, 1921.

== Plot ==
As described in a film magazine, Liane-Demarest, an American girl raised in France and the only daughter of doting parents, has many suitors. She becomes deeply interested in Basil Hammond, a studious young American sent by Liane's grandmother to find out what kind of girl she is. Liane goes into his room at night, destroys his notebook, and pleads with him to be her friend. Thinking that he may have compromised her reputation, he offers to marry her. However, Liane follows the wishes of her parents and becomes engaged to Baron Stransky. At a casino Basil and the baron meet, and later, taking shelter from a storm at a roadhouse, they meet again, and Basil administers a good beating to the baron. The baron challenges him to a duel, and Basil accepts, not knowing that the baron is a crack shot. Basil is saved at the duel when Liane declares her love for the baron. Basil then leaves for the United States on a passenger liner where he finds Liane aboard, having registered as Mrs. Basil Hammond. They are then happily married by the ship's captain.

== Cast ==
- George Periolat as Count Louis Oudoff
- Lillian Lawrence as Countess Oudoff
- Marie Prevost as Liane-Demarest
- Bertram Grassby as Baron Stransky
- George Fisher as Emile Carret
- Lillian Rambeau as Sophie Demarest
- Tom Gallery as Basil Hammond
- Mae Busch as Mamselle Sari
- Rose Dione as Princess
