= The Hellion (1919 film) =

1919 American drama film directed by George L. Cox

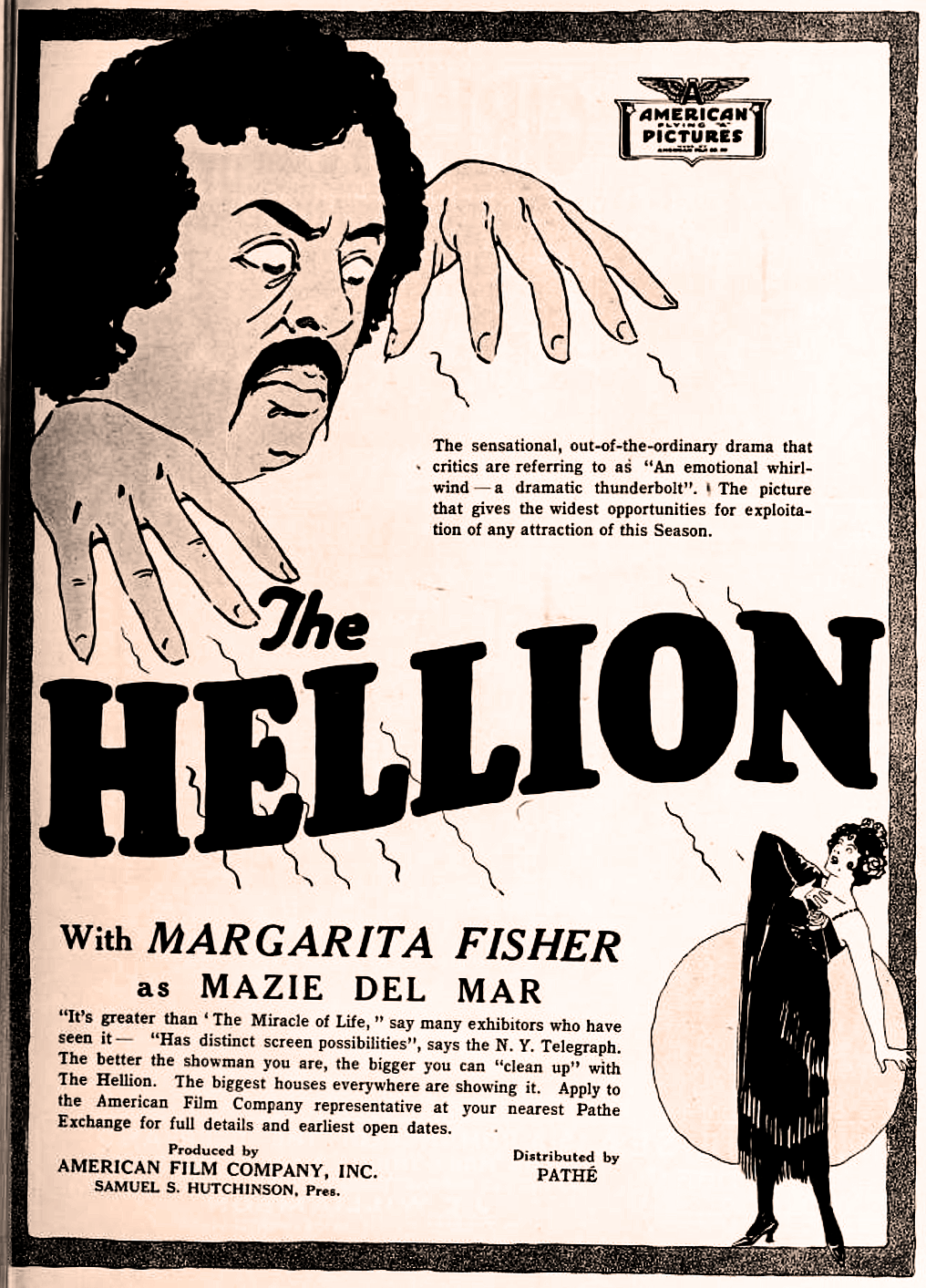
- Motion Picture News Ad
- Directed by: George L. Cox
- Written by: Daniel F. Whitcomb Story and Screenplay
- Produced by: American Film Company
- Starring: Margarita Fischer
- Distributed by: Pathé Exchange
- Release date: October 1919
- Running time: 5 reels
- Country: United States
- Language: Silent (English intertitles

The Hellion is a 1919 American silent drama film directed by George L. Cox and starring Margarita Fischer and Emory Johnson.

== Plot ==
Joseph and Helen Harper, having depleted their niece Blanche's inheritance, become anxious that Blanche's suitor, wealthy George Graham, might reject her upon discovering her descent into madness due to grief over news of his supposed death in the war. Upon George's return, learning of the distressing situation, he engages detectives to investigate further. The Harpers persuade cabaret performer Mazie Del Mar, who bears a striking resemblance to Blanche, to assume Blanche's identity and marry George. Despite Mazie's desire to flee from the control of cabaret owner Signor Enrico, known as "The Hellion," who manipulates her through hypnosis, she reluctantly agrees. However, Mazie falls deeply in love with George and grapples with feelings of deceit. Matters worsen when Enrico mistakenly abducts Blanche, believing her to be Mazie, and futilely attempts to hypnotize her, leading to a fatal confrontation where Blanche loses her life. George, on the brink of Mazie's confession, reveals that his detectives have uncovered her true identity but professes his love for her regardless. He pardons the Harpers as their scheme inadvertently resulted in genuine affection between him and Mazie.

== Cast ==
Actor	Role
Margarita Fischer	Mazie Del Mar / Blanche Harper
Emory Johnson	George Graham
Charles Spere	Larry Lawson
Henry A. Barrows	Joseph Harper
Lillian Langdon	Helen Harper
George Periolat	Signor Enrico
Frank Clark	Undetermined Role
Bull Montana	Undetermined Role
