= Susie's New Shoes =

- Directed by: Harry A. Pollard
- Based on: a story by J. Edward Hungerford
- Produced by: American Film Manufacturing Company
- Starring: Harry A. Pollard; Margarita Fischer
- Distributed by: Mutual Film
- Release date: August 25, 1914
- Running time: 1 reel
- Country: USA
- Language: Silent..English titles

Susie's New Shoes is a lost 1914 silent short film directed by and starring Harry A. Pollard and his wife Margarita Fischer. It was produced by the American Film Manufacturing Company and released by Mutual Film.

== Cast ==
- Margarita Fischer - Suzanna Van Dusen
- Harry A. Pollard - William Van Dusen
- Joe Harris - Fake Blind Man (*or Joseph Harris)
- Fred Gamble - Policeman
- Mary Scott - Mrs. Riley
