= Trixie from Broadway =

1919 silent dram film directed by Roy William Neill

Trixie From Broadway
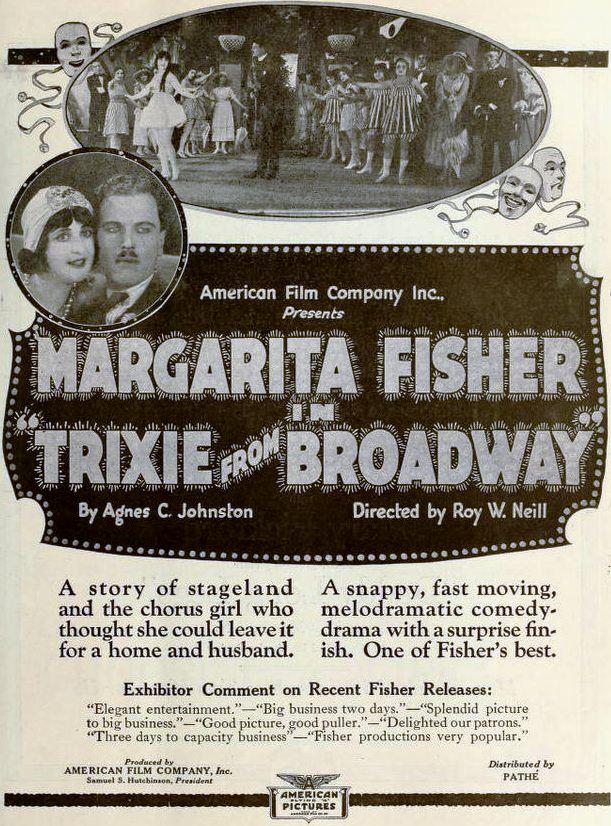
- Magazine Ad
- Directed by: Roy William Neill
- Written by: Frank Howard Clark (scenario); Agnes Christine Johnston (story)
- Distributed by: Pathé Exchange
- Release date: June 1919
- Running time: 5 reels
- Country: USA
- Language: Silent (English intertitles)

Trixie from Broadway is a 1919 silent film drama directed by Roy William Neill and starring Margarita Fischer and Emory Johnson.

== Cast ==
Actor	Role
Margarita Fischer	Trixie Darling
Emory Johnson	John Collins
George Periolat	Broadway Benham
Frank Clark	Jim Brown
Olga Grey	Gertie Brown
J. Farrell MacDonald	Slim Hayes
