= Their Mutual Child (film) =

1920 film

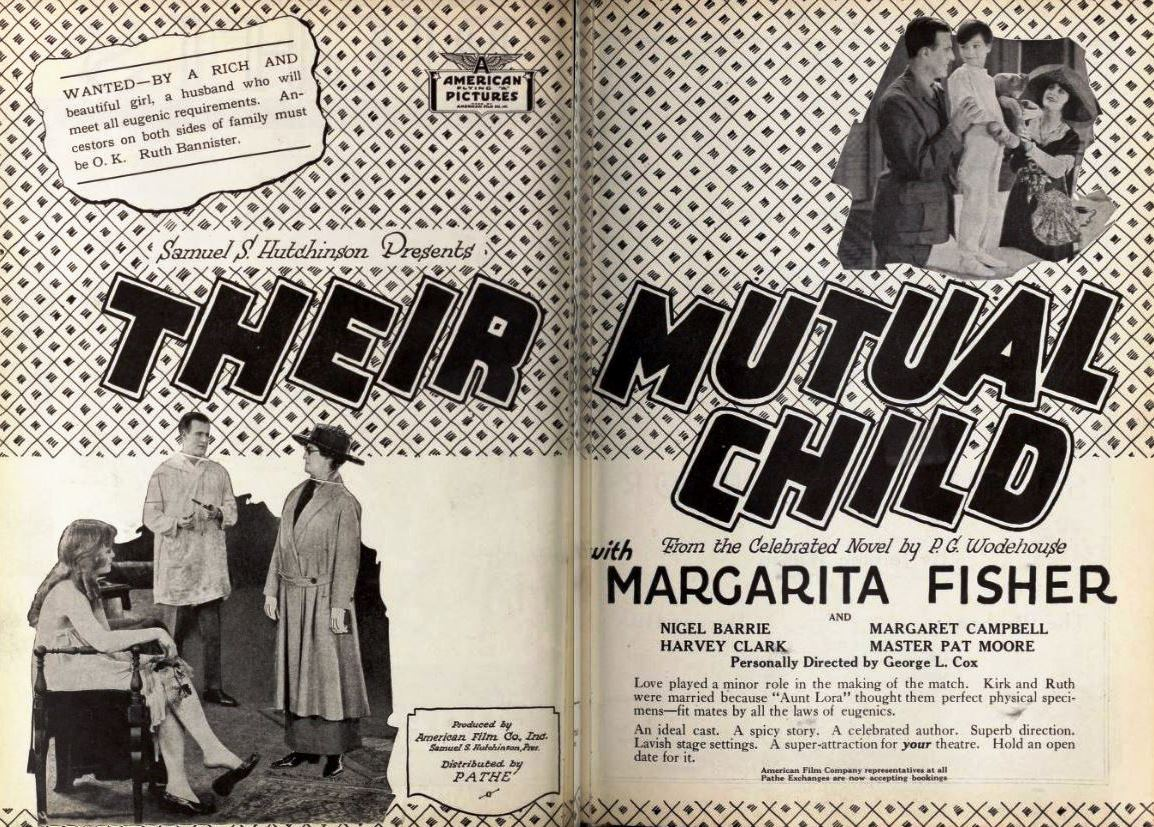
- Directed by: George L. Cox
- Written by: Daniel F. Whitcomb
- Based on: Their Mutual Child by P. G. Wodehouse
- Produced by: Jesse D. Hampton
- Starring: Margarita Fischer; Joseph Bennett; Margaret Campbell
- Cinematography: George Rizard
- Production company: American Film Company
- Distributed by: Pathé Exchange
- Release date: December 1920
- Running time: 6 reels
- Country: United States
- Language: Silent (English intertitles)

Their Mutual Child is a lost 1920 American silent comedy-drama film directed by George L. Cox and starring Margarita Fischer, Joseph Bennett and Margaret Campbell. It was based on the 1919 novel of the same name by P. G. Wodehouse.

== Cast ==
- Margarita Fischer as Ruth Bannister
- Joseph Bennett as Bailey Bannister
- Margaret Campbell as Mrs. Lora Delane Porter
- Nigel Barrie as Kirk Winfield
- Harvey Clark as George Pennicutt
- Andrew Robson as John Bannister
- Beverly Travers as Mamie
- Pat Moore as Baby William Bannister Winfield
- Tom O'Brien as Steve Dingle
- William Lloyd as Hank Jardine
- William Marion as Percy Shanklyn
- Stanhope Wheatcroft as Basil Millbank

== Production ==
The film was directed by George L. Cox with Sidney Algier as assistant director.

== Preservation ==
With no holdings located in archives, Their Mutual Child is considered a lost film.

== Bibliography ==
- Goble, Alan. The Complete Index to Literary Sources in Film. Walter de Gruyter, 1999.
- Taves, Brian (2006). P. G. Wodehouse and Hollywood: Screenwriting, Satires and Adaptations. London: McFarland & Company. ISBN 978-0-7864-2288-3.
