= The Tiger Lily =

1919 American drama film directed by George L. Cox

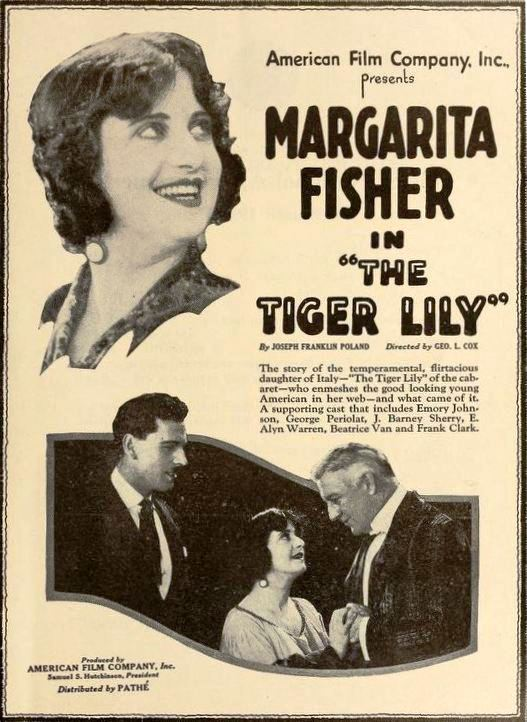
- Advertisement
- Directed by: George L. Cox
- Written by: Joseph F. Poland Story and Screenplay
- Produced by: American Film
- Starring: Margarita Fischer
- Distributed by: Pathé Exchange
- Release date: July 1919
- Running time: 5 reels
- Country: United States
- Language: Silent (English intertitles)

The Tiger Lily is a lost 1919 American silent drama film directed by George L. Cox and starring Margarita Fischer and Emory Johnson.

== Cast ==
Actor	Role
Margarita Fischer	Carmina
Emory Johnson	David Remington
George Periolat	Luigi
E. Alyn Warren	Giovanni
J. Barney Sherry	Philip Remington
Rosita Marstini	Mrs. Philip Remington
Beatrice Van	Dorothy Van Rensselaer
Frank Clark	Antonio

== Preservation ==
With no holdings located in archives, The Tiger Lily is considered a lost film.
