= Eve in Exile =

1919 American silent drama film

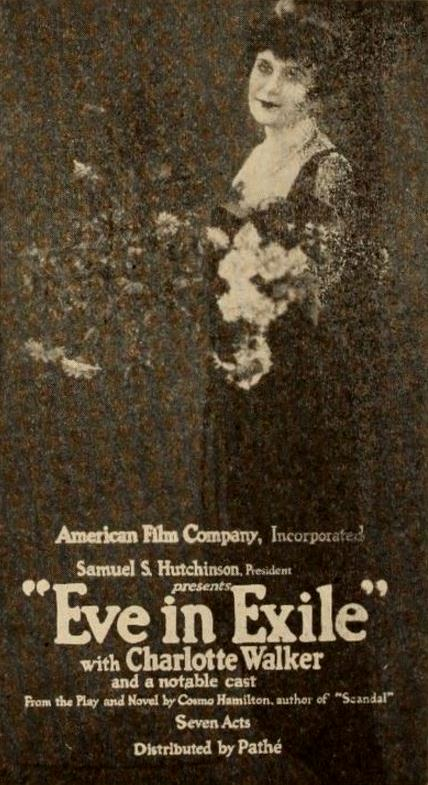
- Directed by: Burton George
- Written by: Lois Zellner
- Based on: Eve in Exile by Cosmo Hamilton
- Starring: Charlotte Walker
- Cinematography: Dal Clawson
- Production company: American Film Company
- Distributed by: Pathé Exchange
- Release date: December 1919
- Running time: 7 reels
- Country: United States
- Language: Silent (English intertitles)

Eve in Exile is a 1919 American silent drama film directed by Burton George based upon a novel by Cosmo Hamilton. It stars stage actress Charlotte Walker and was distributed by Pathe Exchange.

The film is preserved in the Library of Congress collection.

== Plot ==
As described in a film magazine, when financial ruin overtakes her father, Eve Ricardo (Walker) is sent to live with an aunt in a small town in New England. Here she meets and falls in love with Paul Armitage (Oakman), an author, who returns her affection. However, John Sheen (Santschi) has also fallen in love with Eve and resolves to take any measures necessary to win her. His sister, Mrs. Nina Carey (Palmer), feels the same way about Paul. This leads to various complications.

== Cast ==
- Charlotte Walker as Eve Ricardo
- Thomas Santschi as John Sheen
- Wheeler Oakman as Paul Armitage
- Melbourne MacDowell as George Armitage
- Violet Palmer as Mrs. Nina Carey
- Martha Mattox as Elizabeth Kekewich
- George Periolat as Jim Ricardo
- Harvey Clark as Easter Monday
- Lee Shumway as Dr. Courtland
- Perry Banks as Simon Bean
