= George Periolat =

American actor

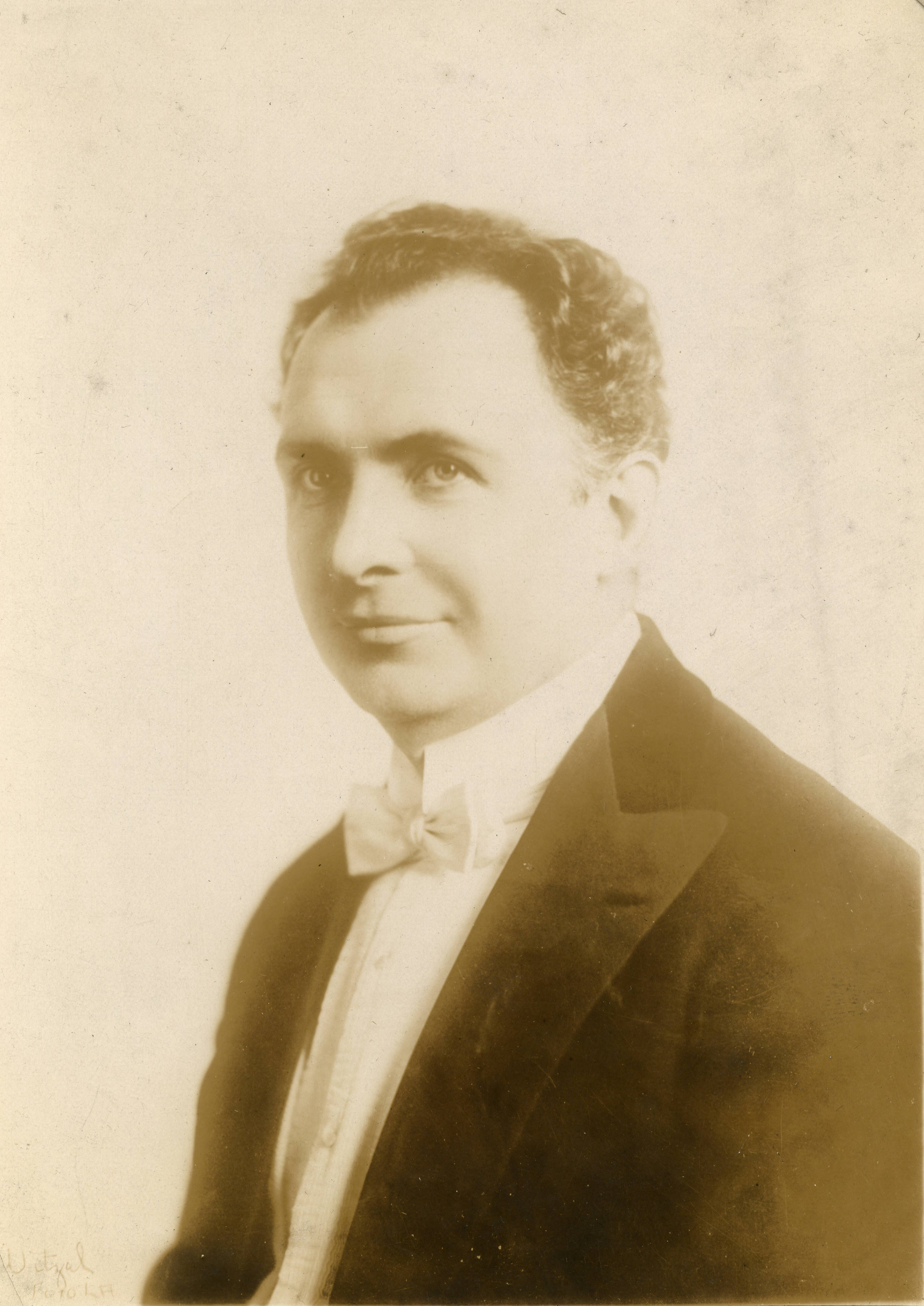
- Periolat in 1915
- Born: February 5, 1874; Chicago, Illinois, U.S.
- Died: February 20, 1940 (aged 66); Los Angeles, California, U.S.
- Occupation: Actor
- Years active: 1911–1932

George Periolat (February 5, 1874 – February 20, 1940) was an American actor.

== Biography ==
Born in Chicago, Illinois, George Periolat began his career as a Broadway actor. Making his film debut with the Essanay Studios in Chicago, he moved to Hollywood in 1911 and starred in over 170 films throughout his career. He was a very versatile actor, often playing multiple roles in a single production, as when he played two leading characters, the count and the crook, in the 1916 production of The Counterfeit Earl. He made his last appearance in 1932's What Price Hollywood?

Outside his acting career, George Periolat was an amateur photographer, and a grandson of Clemens Periolat.

== Personal life and death ==
George Periolat was born on February 5, 1874, the youngest child to Clemens Periolat and Mary Jane Periolat (nee Dunne). He had two older brothers, James who was 12 years older than him and Albert who was 10 years older. While starting his acting career in Chicago he also worked in his family's fur business as a sales clerk. His father hoped he would go into the business, but he got a job with Essenay instead and remained in films.

Periolat was found dead in his Hollywood apartment on February 20, 1940, having ingested arsenic. Police Detective F. G. Kull said Periolat had been struggle with health issues for three years at the time of his death, and that there was "no evidence of foul play or that he had taken his own life".

== Filmography ==
=== 1910s ===
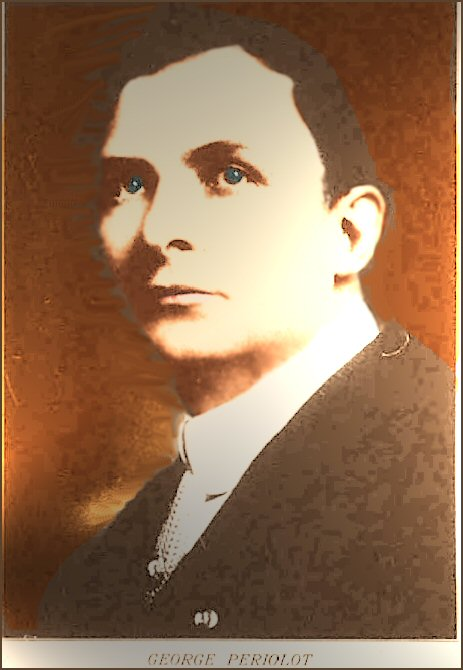
Photoplay Magazine, 1912

- The Water War (1911)
- The Angel of Paradise Ranch (1911)
- From the Four Hundred to the Herd (1912)
- The Maid and the Man (1912)
- The Thread of Life (1912)
- The Evil Inheritance (1912) as The Father
- Where There's a Heart (1912) as The Prospector
- Her Own Country (1912)
- Nell of the Pampas (1912)
- Cupid Never Ages (1913)
- Calamity Anne's Beauty (1913)
- The Road to Ruin (1913)
- Oil on Troubled Waters (1913)
- Calamity Anne's Parcel Post (1913)
- The Wishing Seat (1913)
- Her Big Story (1913)
- A Husband's Mistake (1913)
- Quicksands (1913)
- Truth in the Wilderness (1913)
- The Scapegoat (1913)
- For the Flag (1913)
- For the Crown (1913)
- Calamity Anne, Heroine (1913)
- Travellers of the Road (1913)
- The Badge of Honor (1913)
- A Pitfall of the Installment Plan (1913)
- The Step Brothers (1913)
- The Restless Spirit (1913)
- In the Days of Trajan (1913)
- The Girl and the Greaser (1913)
- The Passerby (1913)
- The Tale of the Ticker (1913)
- The Barrier of Bars (1913)
- The Dread Inheritance (1913) as The Father
- Incognito (1913)
- Rory o' the Bogs (1913)
- The Field Foreman (1913)
- The Magic Skin (1914)
- The Man Who Lied (1914)
- The Man Between (1914)
- Hearts and Flowers (1914)
- The Acid Test (1914)
- Sealed Orders (1914)
- The Bolted Door (1914)
- The Lion (1914)
- Samson (1914) as Manoah, Samson's father
- As Fate Willed (1914)
- Toilers of the Sea (1914)
- The Call Back (1914)
- The Sheep Herder (1914)
- The Sandhill Lovers (1914) as Hardy, the Rustler
- A Twentieth Century Pirate (1914)
- At Mexico's Mercy (1914)
- Value Received (1914)
- Out of the Valley (1914)
- Man and His Brother (1914)
- There Is a Destiny (1914)
- Weight and Measures (1914)
- The Man from Nowhere (1914)
- Little Meg and I (1914)
- A Kentucky Gentleman (1914)
- The Proof of a Man (1914)
- Disillusioned (1914)
- His Father's Son (1914/I)
- His Heart His Hand and His Sword (1914)
- The Empire of Illusion (1914)
- The Inn of the Winged Gods (1914)
- The King and the Man (1914)
- A Bogus Bandit (1915)
- Smouldering Fires (1915)
- The Storm (1915)
- The Guardian of the Flock (1915)
- The Stool Pigeon (1915) as Oswald Trumble
- The Diamond from the Sky (1915) as Luke Lovell
- The Palace of Dust (1915)
- When a Queen Loved O'Rourke (1915)
- The Road to Paradise (1915) as Prince Vladislav
- Curly (1915)
- Viviana (1916)
- The Smugglers of Santa Cruz (1916)
- Life's Harmony (1916)
- The Silken Spider (1916)
- The Code of Honor (1916)
- Ways of the World (1916)
- The Wayfarers (1916)
- Realization (1916)
- The Counterfeit Earl (1916)
- The Touch on the Key (1916)
- Four Months (1916)
- Jealousy's First Wife (1916)
- The Gentle Conspiracy (1916)
- Tangled Skeins (1916)
- Killed by Whom? (1916)
- The Quicksands of Deceit (1916)
- The Dancer (1916)
- Pastures Green (1916)
- The Little Troubadour (1916)
- Enchantment (1916)
- The Atonement (1916)
- The Sable Blessing (1916) as Crow
- Philip Holden - Waster (1916) as Miles Holden
- And the Law Says (1916) as Dr. Cartmell
- The Valley of Decision (1916) as Dr. Brainard
- The Gentle Intruder (1917)
- The Gilded Youth (1917)
- Double Revenge (1917)
- Nature's Calling (1917)
- The Old Sheriff (1917)
- Environment (1917) as David Holcombe
- Annie-for-Spite (1917) as Andrew Walters
- Her Country's Call (1917) as Jim Slocum
- Periwinkle (1917) as Ephraiam Rawlins
- Melissa of the Hills (1917) as Cyrus Kimball
- Sands of Sacrifice (1917) as Enoch Foyle
- Southern Pride (1917) as James Morgan
- A Game of Wits (1917) as Cyrus Browning
- The Mate of the Sally Ann (1917) as Captain Ward
- Rosemary Climbs the Heights (1918) as Godfrey Van Voort
- Beauty and the Rogue (1918) as Thomas Lee
- Social Briars (1918) as Peter Andrews
- The Ghost of Rosy Taylor (1918) as Charles Eldridge/Joseph Sayles
- The Eyes of Julia Deep (1918) as Timothy Black
- Wives and Other Wives (1918) as Judge Corcoran
- The Amazing Impostor (1919) as Henry Hope
- Put Up Your Hands (1919) as Peter Barton
- The Intrusion of Isabel (1919) as Henry Whitney
- Trixie from Broadway (1919) as Broadway Benham
- A Sporting Chance (1919) as Edward Craig
- The Tiger Lily (1919) as Luigi
- The Hellion (1919) as Signor Enrico
- Beckoning Roads (1919) as John Graysoon
- Eve in Exile (1919) as Jim Ricardo

=== 1920s ===
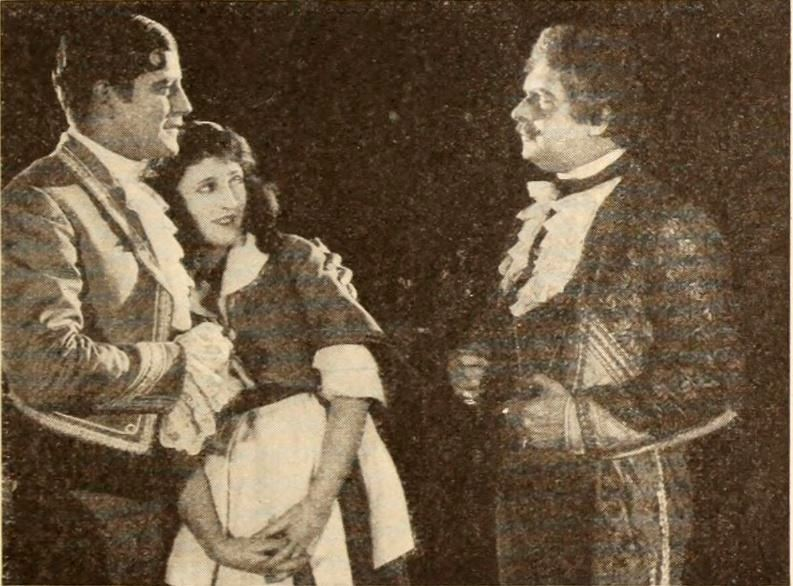
Periolat (right) in The Kiss (1921)

- Judy of Rogue's Harbor (1920) as Peter Kingsland
- The Dangerous Talent (1920) as Peyton Dodge
- Nurse Marjorie (1920) as Andrew Danbury
- Parlor, Bedroom and Bath (1920) as Fred Leslie
- Life's Twist (1920) as Mr. Boyd Chester
- The Mark of Zorro (1920) as Gov. Alvarado
- Two Weeks with Pay (1921) as Ginsberg
- The Kiss (1921) as Don Luis Baldarama
- Who Am I? (1921) as John Collins
- They Shall Pay (1921) as Amos Colby
- Wealth (1921) as Irving Seaton
- Her Face Value (1921) as James R. Greenwood
- A Parisian Scandal (1921) as Count Louis Oudoff
- Shattered Idols (1922) as The High Priest
- Gay and Devilish (1922) as Nethercote
- The Dust Flower (1922) as Ott
- Blood and Sand (1922) as Marquis of Guevera
- The Young Rajah (1922) as General Gadi
- The Tiger's Claw (1923) as Henry Frazer Halehurst
- The Barefoot Boy (1923) as Si Parker
- Rosita (1923) as Rosita's father
- Slave of Desire (1923) as The Duke
- The Yankee Consul (1924) as Don Rafael Desschado
- Lovers' Lane (1924) as Dr. Stone
- The Red Lily (1924) as Papa Bouchard
- The Girl on the Stairs (1925) as Dr. Bourget
- Any Woman (1925) as Robert Cartwright
- Fighting Youth (1925) as Judge Manley
- The Phantom Express (1925) as John Lane
- The Nutcracker (1926) as Señor Gómez
- Atta Boy (1926)
- In Search of a Hero (1926) as Frenchman
- Butterflies in the Rain (1926)
- The Mile-a-Minute Man (1926) as C.O. 'Old Ironsides' Rockett
- The Prairie King (1927) as Ramon Fernandez
- Speedy Smith (1927) as Charles C. Smith
- Through Thick and Thin (1927) as James Morris
- Fangs of Destiny (1927) as Colonel Shelby
- Alias the Deacon (1928)
- The Secret Hour (1928) as Doctor
- Black Butterflies (1928) as Hatch
- Night Watch (1928) as Fargasson
- When Dreams Come True (1929) as Robert Swayne
- The Fatal Warning (1929) as William Rogers
- One Splendid Hour (1929) as Senator Walsh

=== 1930s ===
- Cracked Nuts (1931) as Royal Advisor (uncredited)
- What Price Hollywood? (1932) (uncredited)
