= Charge It to Me =

1919 American Comedy film directed by Roy William Neill

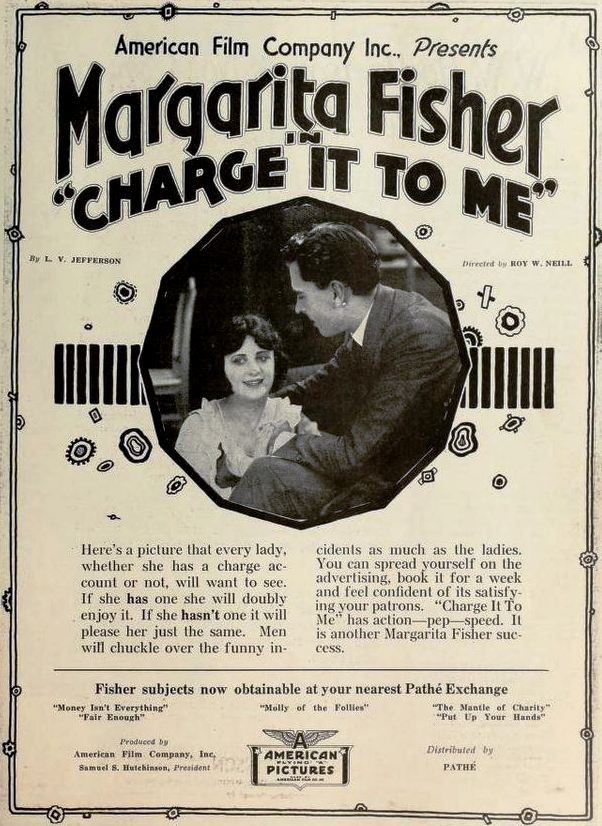
- Newspaper ad
- Directed by: Roy William Neill
- Written by: L. V. Jefferson; Story, Screenplay
- Produced by: American Film
- Starring: Margarita Fischer
- Distributed by: Pathé Exchange
- Release date: May 1919
- Running time: 5 reels
- Country: United States
- Language: Silent (English intertitles)

Charge It to Me is a 1919 American silent comedy film directed by Roy William Neill and written by L. V. Jefferson. The film stars Margarita Fischer and Emory Johnson. The film was released on May 4, 1919, by Pathé Exchange.

== Cast ==
Actor	Role
Margarita Fischer	Winnie Davis
Emory Johnson	Elmer Davis
Augustus Phillips	Howard Weston
Lafe McKee	Col. Godfrey Hibbard
Charles A. Post	Arche Gunn
Bull Montana	'Corkscrew' McGann
George Swann	Hercules Strong
J. Farrell MacDonald	Officer Hennessey
Sophie Todd	Maggie

== Picture Gallery ==
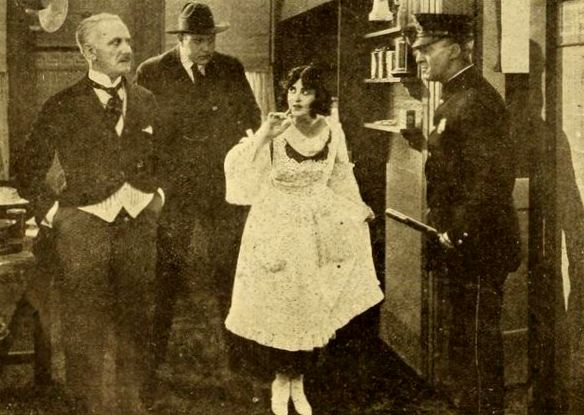
Magazine Ad

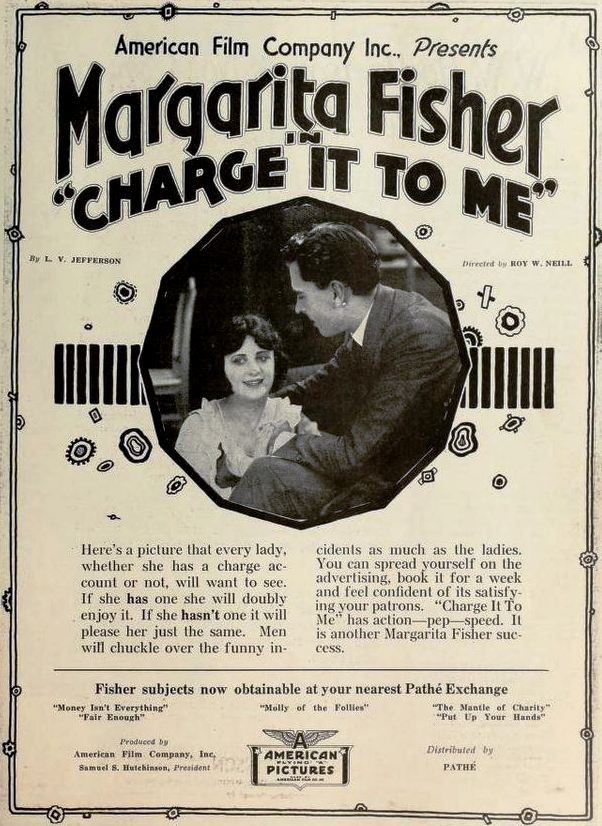
Newspaper Ad
