= Jim's Atonement =

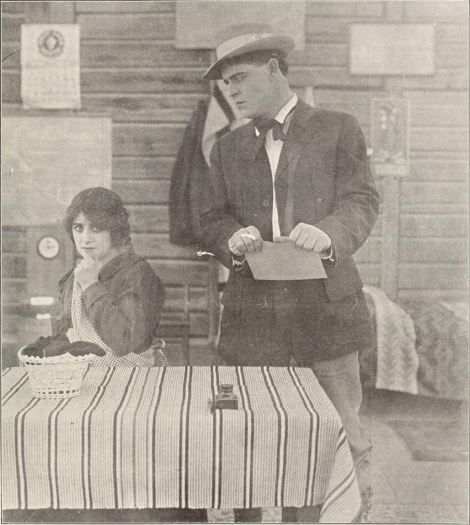
- Still of scene in the film with Margarita Fischer and Harry Pollard
- Directed by: Edward LeSaint
- Written by: Lillian Winbigler
- Produced by: Carl Laemmle; Independent Moving Pictures
- Starring: Harry A. Pollard; Margarita Fischer; Eddie Lyons
- Distributed by: Motion Picture Distributors and Sales Company
- Release date: February 8, 1912
- Running time: 300 m (1 reel)
- Country: United States
- Languages: Silent; English intertitles

Jim's Atonement is a 1912 American drama film. It was produced by the Independent Moving Pictures (IMP) Company of New York, and was one of the first directorial efforts of actor Edward LeSaint.

== Trivia ==
Harry A. Pollard and Margarita Fischer, who play the married couple Jim and Molly in this film, were actually husband and wife in real life.
