= Her Big Story =

1913 film by Allan Dwan

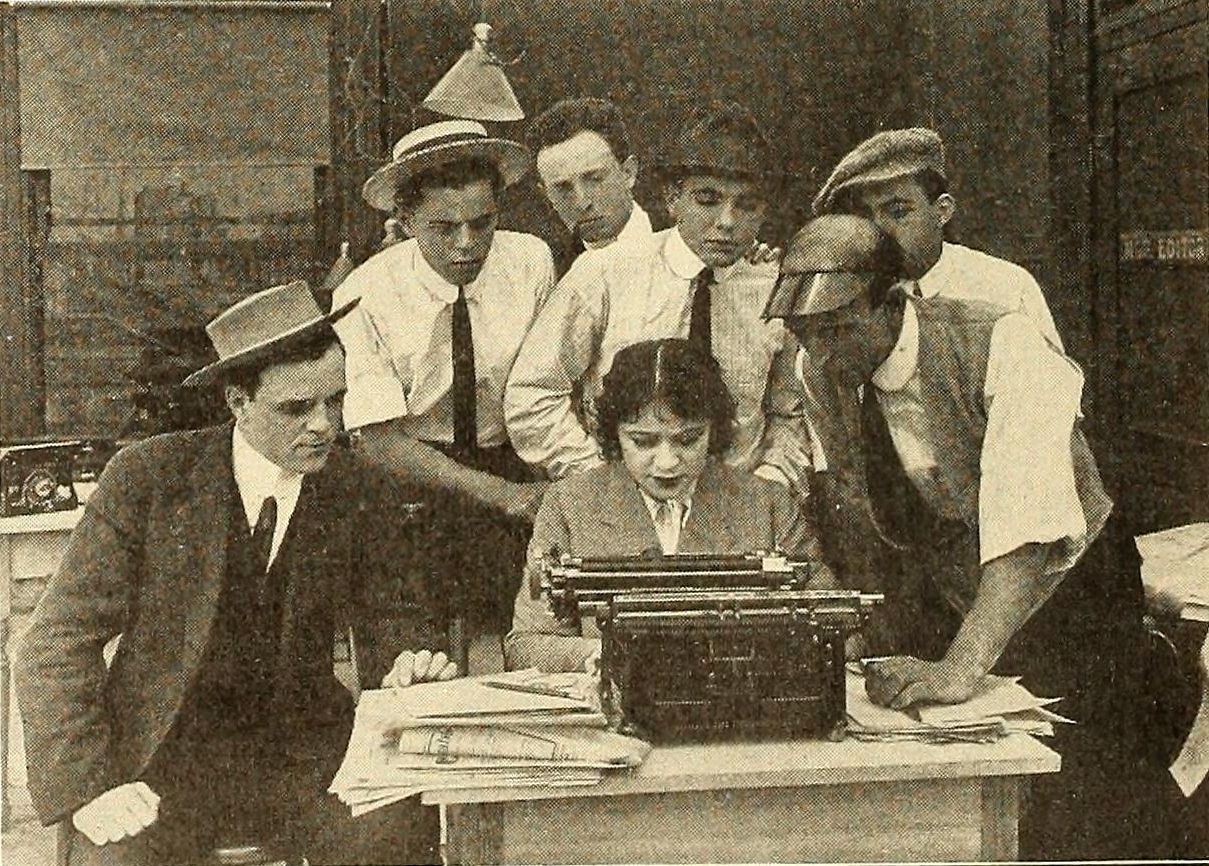
- Directed by: Allan Dwan
- Written by: Richard Washburn Child (story)
- Starring: J. Warren Kerrigan; Charlotte Burton; George Periolat; Jack Richardson
- Release date: May 31, 1913
- Country: United States
- Languages: Silent film English intertitles

Her Big Story is a 1913 American silent short drama film directed by Allan Dwan starring J. Warren Kerrigan, Charlotte Burton, George Periolat, and Jack Richardson.

== Plot ==
According to a film magazine, "Beatrice Nevin, the Union's utility woman, did "space work" for a living, which is another way of saying that Beatrice was very poor. Joel Hammond, the business managing editor, grew very fond of Beatrice, for he was a bachelor and a much abused newspaper man. The owner of the Union was a mysterious personage, whom the staff discussed in whispers. Beatrice then was seized with a mania to pry into the city affairs of the "boss" and see what story she might uncover.

From then on she shadowed the mayor and neglected her regular work, and one day when Joel could no longer stand her charming beauty, he kissed her and they plighted their troth then and there, although Joel, as managing editor, warned her not to go too far on the big story.

One day the mysterious boss, George Huestiss, owner of the Union, motored to the mayor's home. Later, with Beatrice hot on the trail, the mayor came out with Huestiss and they dismissed the chauffeur. This aroused Beatrice's suspicions and, climbing through a window, she found herself in the deserted library of the mayor's home. There she found the papers which revealed the big story and then she heard footsteps which sent her scurrying behind the curtains. A moment later Huestiss and the mayor entered. Not finding the papers, they grew excited, and in the search discovered Beatrice. Then she made her mistake, telling them that she had the story and that the Union that night would print it. They laughed at her and Huestiss discharged her on the spot. The mayor attempted to grab her, but, eluding him, she bowled him over with a statuette and fled through the window.

Back she raced to the office and hammered out her story. Then she took it in to her sweetheart, Joel, and he read it with a frown and tried to tear it up. Then Huestiss entered and ordered Joel to destroy the story. But Joel, seeing his sweetheart's waning faith in him, threw all to the winds and resigned. The opposition paper that night carried the big story and Joel crept through dark alleyways to the dreary rooms of Beatrice. Love settled the editorial difference of opinion."

== Production ==
During filming, Jack Richardson sustained a head injury from Charlotte Burton wielding a bust of Apollo, requiring four stitches.
