= The Merry Wives of Windsor (disambiguation) =

The Merry Wives of Windsor is an English play by William Shakespeare which was first published in 1602.

The Merry Wives of Windsor may also refer to:

- The Merry Wives of Windsor (opera), an 1849 German opera by Otto Nicolai
- The Merry Wives of Windsor (1910 film), a 1910 American silent historical comedy film
- The Merry Wives of Windsor (1918 film), a 1918 German silent comedy film
- The Merry Wives of Windsor (1950 film), an East German adaptation of the opera directed by Georg Wildhagen
- The Merry Wives of Windsor (1965 film), an Austrian-British adaptation of the opera directed by Georg Tressler
- BBC Television Shakespeare, Season Five - The Merry Wives of Winsor (1982) directed by David Jones

== See also ==
- Overture to The Merry Wives of Windsor, a 1953 Oscar-winning film of a performance of the opera's overture
