= The Merry Wives of Windsor (1910 film) =

1910 film by Francis Boggs

- Directed by: Francis Boggs
- Based on: the play The Merry Wives of Windsor by William Shakespeare
- Produced by: William Selig
- Starring: Kathlyn Williams; Margarita Fischer
- Distributed by: General Film Company
- Release date: November 24, 1910
- Running time: 1 reel
- Country: USA
- Language: Silent..English titles

The Merry Wives of Windsor is a 1910 silent short historical comedy based on the play by William Shakespeare directed by Francis Boggs and produced by the Selig Polyscope Company. Two cast members were Kathlyn Williams and Margarita Fischer.

The film is preserved in the Library of Congress.

== Cast ==
- Kathlyn Williams - Mistress Ford
- Margarita Fischer - Mistress Page
