= Sunset Jones =

1921 film

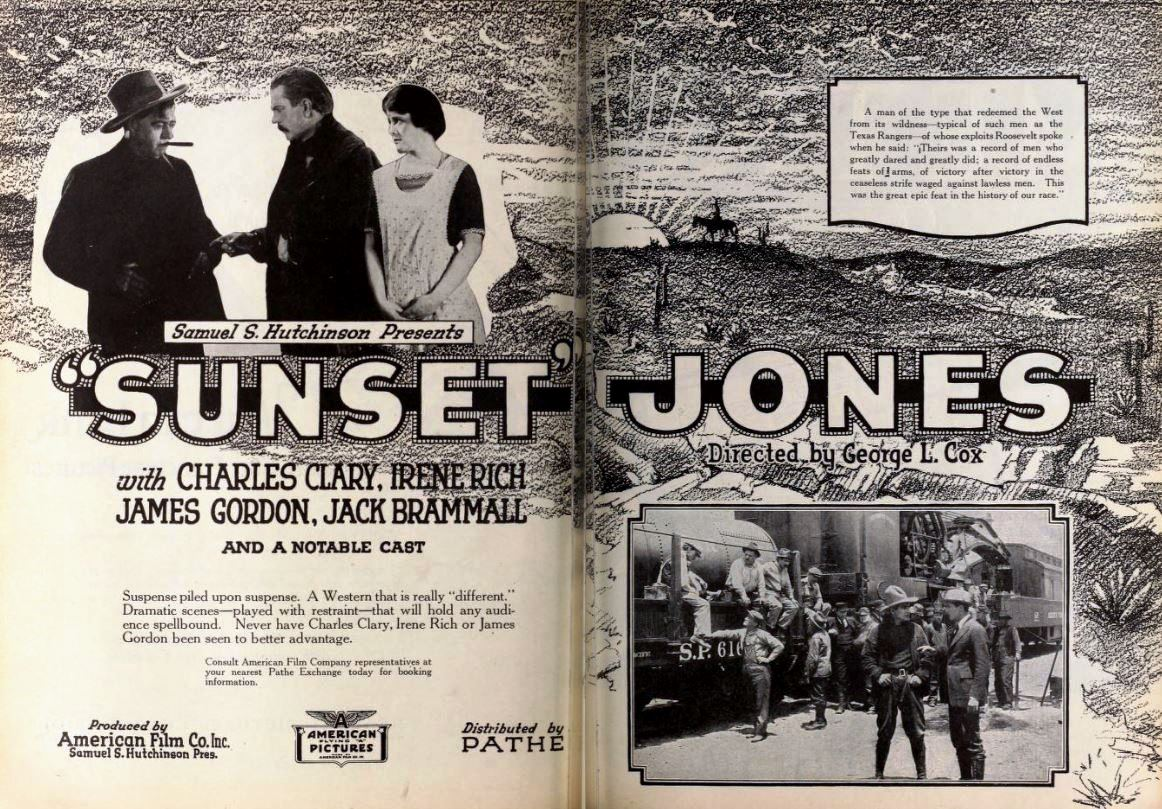
- Theatrical release poster
- Directed by: George L. Cox
- Written by: Daniel F. Whitcomb
- Starring: Charles Clary; James Gordon; Irene Rich
- Production company: American Film Company
- Distributed by: Pathé Exchange
- Release date: January 1921
- Running time: 5 reels
- Country: United States
- Languages: Silent; English intertitles

Sunset Jones is a 1921 American silent Western film directed by George L. Cox and starring Charles Clary, James Gordon, and Irene Rich.

== Cast ==
- Charles Clary as Sunset Jones
- James Gordon as David Rand
- Irene Rich as Marion Rand
- Kathleen O'Connor as Molly Forbes

== Bibliography ==
- Munden, Kenneth White. The American Film Institute Catalog of Motion Pictures Produced in the United States, Part 1. University of California Press, 1997.
