= Payment Guaranteed =

1921 silent film by George L. Cox

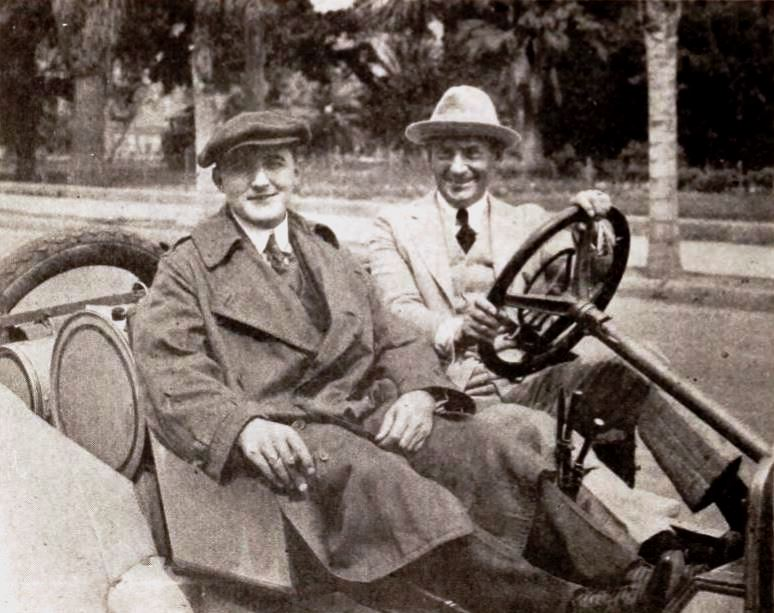
- Still with Cecil Van Auker riding with director George L. Cox
- Directed by: George L. Cox
- Written by: Lois Zellner
- Starring: Margarita Fischer; Cecil Van Auker; Hayward Mack
- Cinematography: George Rizard
- Production company: American Film Company
- Distributed by: Pathé Exchange
- Release date: March 1921
- Running time: 5 reels
- Country: United States
- Language: Silent (English intertitles)

Payment Guaranteed is a 1921 American silent drama film directed by George L. Cox and starring Margarita Fischer, Cecil Van Auker, and Hayward Mack.

== Cast ==
- Margarita Fischer as Emily Heath
- Cecil Van Auker as Stephen Strange
- Hayward Mack as Harry Fenton
- Harry Lonsdale as Jim Barton
- Harvey Clark as Reporter
- Marjorie Manners as Myrtle
- Alice Wilson as Gertie

== Bibliography ==
- St. Romain, Theresa. Margarita Fischer: A Biography of the Silent Film Star. McFarland, 2008.
