= The Amazing Impostor =

1919 film by Lloyd Ingraham

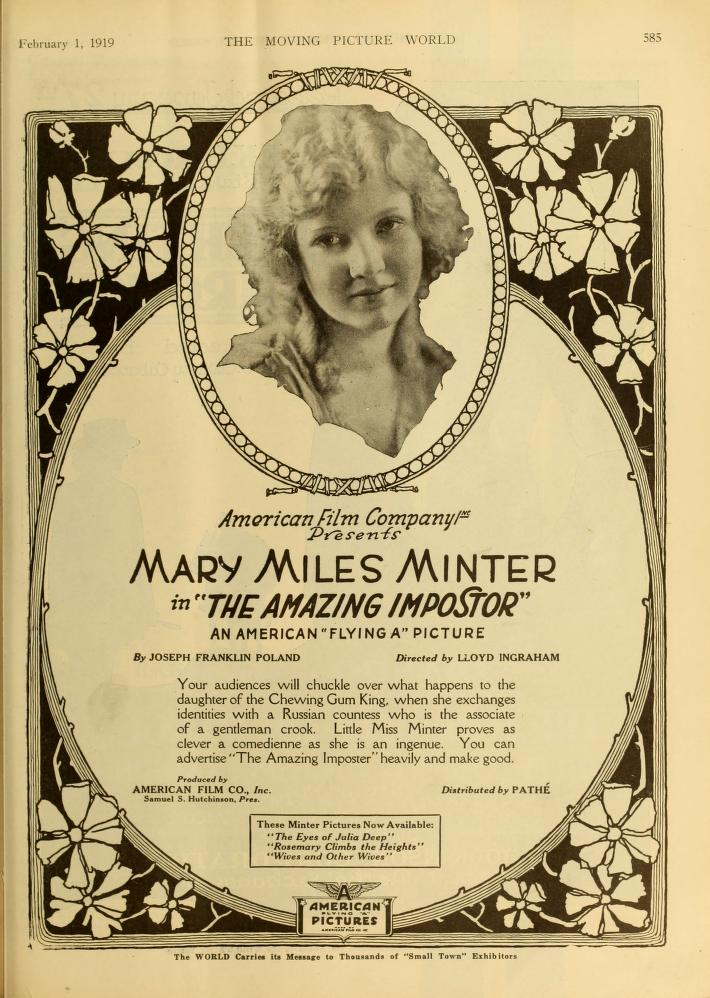
- Directed by: Lloyd Ingraham
- Written by: Joseph Franklin Poland (screen story); Frank Howard Clark (scenario)
- Starring: Mary Miles Minter
- Production company: American Film Company
- Distributed by: Pathé Exchange
- Release date: February 2, 1919
- Running time: 5 reels
- Country: United States
- Language: Silent (English intertitles)

The Amazing Impostor is a 1919 American silent comedy film starring Mary Miles Minter and directed by Lloyd Ingraham. As with many of Minter's features, it is thought to be a lost film.

== Plot ==
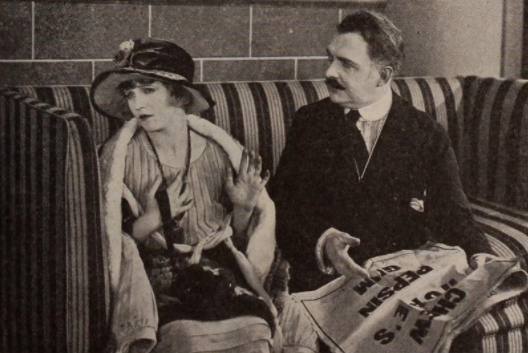
Mary Miles Minter and George Periolat in "The Amazing Impostor" (1919)

As described in various film magazine reviews, Joan Hope is the daughter of the "Chewing Gum King", who longs for adventure and romance. When her father is away on business, she seizes the opportunity to do a little travelling of her own. On the train, she meets the "Countess of Crex" who proposes that, being of similar appearance and dress, she and Joan should swap identities for a week. Joan agrees eagerly, unaware that the "Countess" is in fact a crook in possession of stolen diamonds, who proposes the swap in the hope of avoiding the detective on her trail.

While Joan and the "Countess" are swapping personal effects, their packages are also swapped by mistake, leaving the "Countess" with a box of chewing gum, and Joan with the stolen diamonds. Quite unaware of this, Joan checks into a hotel under the name of the "Countess of Crex," trailed by Detective Kent Standish, who is convinced that she is the real thief.

For a time, Joan enjoys the attention that comes with being a Countess, along with the attentions of Standish, who is attracted to her despite the fact that he believes her to be a married criminal. However, the appeal of her new identity begins to wane when she is threatened firstly by some Russians demanding papers, and then by crooks demanding the diamonds.

At this point Joan's father, having returned home to find his daughter gone, arrives at the hotel, along with the original fake Countess, who is seeking to exchange the box of chewing gum for the diamonds. The truth is revealed, the crooks are arrested, and Detective Standish is pleased to discover that Joan is neither a criminal nor married.

== Cast ==
- Mary Miles Minter - Joan Hope
- Edward Jobson - Plinius Plumm Plunket
- Margaret Shelby - Countess of Crex
- Carl Stockdale - Robert La Rue
- Allan Forrest - Kent Standish
- Henry A. Barrows - Herbert Thornton
- George Periolat - Henry Hope
- Demetrius Mitsoras - Mike
- John Gough - Ike
