= George L. Cox =

American actor (1878–1947)

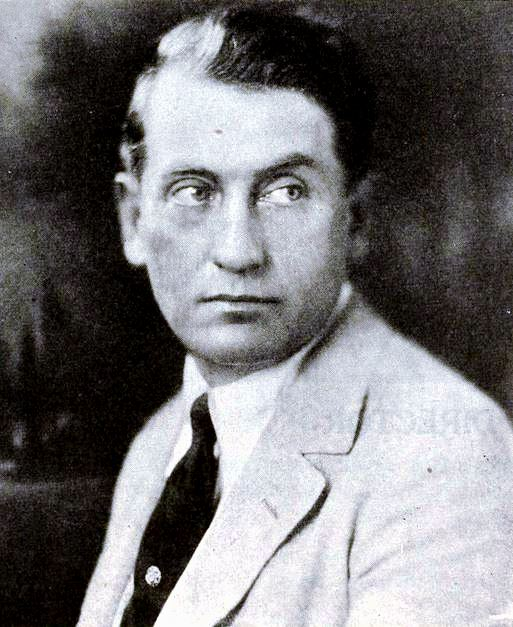
- Cox in 1921
- Born: November 17, 1878; United States
- Died: 1947 (aged 68–69); United States
- Occupations: Director, actor
- Years active: 1910–1921 (film)

George L. Cox (November 17, 1878 – 1947) was an American actor and film director.

== Selected filmography ==
- The Tiger Lily (1919)
- The Hellion (1919)
- The House of Toys (1920)
- The Gamesters (1920)
- The Week-End (1920)
- The Thirtieth Piece of Silver (1920)
- A Light Woman (1920)
- The Blue Moon (1920)
- The Dangerous Talent (1920)
- Sunset Jones (1921)
- Payment Guaranteed (1921)
- Their Mutual Child (1921)

== Bibliography ==
- Goble, Alan. The Complete Index to Literary Sources in Film. Walter de Gruyter, 1999. ISBN 978-3-598-11492-2.
