= Fair Enough =

1918 film directed by Edward Sloman

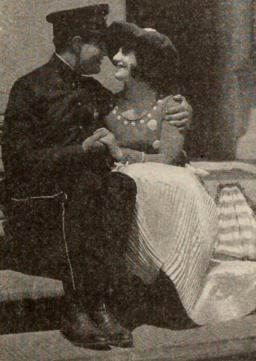
- Still featured in Exhibitors Herald, 1918
- Directed by: Edward Sloman
- Written by: Elizabeth Mahoney; Joseph Anthony Roach
- Starring: Margarita Fischer; Eugenie Forde; Alfred Hollingsworth
- Cinematography: Gilbert Warrenton
- Production company: American Film Company
- Distributed by: Pathé Exchange
- Release date: December 29, 1918
- Running time: 50 minutes
- Country: United States
- Language: Silent (English intertitles)

Fair Enough is a 1918 American silent comedy film directed by Edward Sloman and starring Margarita Fischer, Eugenie Forde, and Alfred Hollingsworth.

== Cast ==
- Margarita Fischer as Ann Dickson
- Eugenie Forde as Mrs. Ellen Dickson
- Alfred Hollingsworth as James Dickson Esq.
- Alice Knowland as Madame Ohnet
- Harry McCoy as Frederick Pierson
- Jack Mower as Carey Phelan
- Bull Montana as 'Happy' Flanigan
- J. Farrell MacDonald as Chief of Police Morgan

== Bibliography ==
- George A. Katchmer. Eighty Silent Film Stars: Biographies and Filmographies of the Obscure to the Well Known. McFarland, 1991.
