= Daniel F. Whitcomb =

American screenwriter

- Born: February 24, 1875; Louisville, Kentucky, United States
- Died: May 16, 1944 (aged 69); Los Angeles, California, United States
- Occupation: Writer
- Years active: 1914–1924 (film)

Daniel F. Whitcomb (1875–1944) was an American screenwriter of the silent era.

== Selected filmography ==
- Sold at Auction (1917)
- Told at Twilight (1917)
- The Bride's Silence (1917)
- A Game of Wits (1917)
- The Locked Heart (1918)
- Rosemary Climbs the Heights (1918)
- The Blue Moon (1920)
- The Thirtieth Piece of Silver (1920)
- The House of Toys (1920)
- Their Mutual Child (1921)
- Sunset Jones (1921)
- Another Man's Boots (1922)
- Peaceful Peters (1922)
- At Devil's Gorge (1923)
- Spawn of the Desert (1923)
- Battling Bates (1923)
- The Desert Hawk (1924)

== Bibliography ==
- Langman, Larry. A Guide to Silent Westerns. Greenwood Publishing Group, 1992.
