= The Thirtieth Piece of Silver =

1920 film

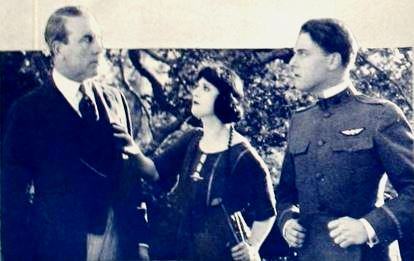
- Directed by: George L. Cox
- Written by: Albert Payson Terhune (novel); Daniel F. Whitcomb
- Starring: Margarita Fischer; King Baggot; Forrest Stanley
- Production company: American Film Company
- Distributed by: Pathé Exchange
- Release date: May 15, 1920
- Running time: 60 minutes
- Country: United States
- Languages: Silent; English intertitles

The Thirtieth Piece of Silver is a lost 1920 American silent drama film directed by George L. Cox and starring Margarita Fischer, King Baggot and Forrest Stanley.

== Cast ==
- Margarita Fischer as Leila Cole
- King Baggot as Tyler Cole
- Forrest Stanley as Captain Peyton Lake
- Lillian Leighton as Mignon Brunner

== Preservation ==
With no holdings located in archives, The Thirtieth Piece of Silver is considered lost.

== Bibliography ==
- Connelly, Robert B. The Silents: Silent Feature Films, 1910-36, Volume 40, Issue 2. December Press, 1998.
