= The Dangerous Talent =

1920 film

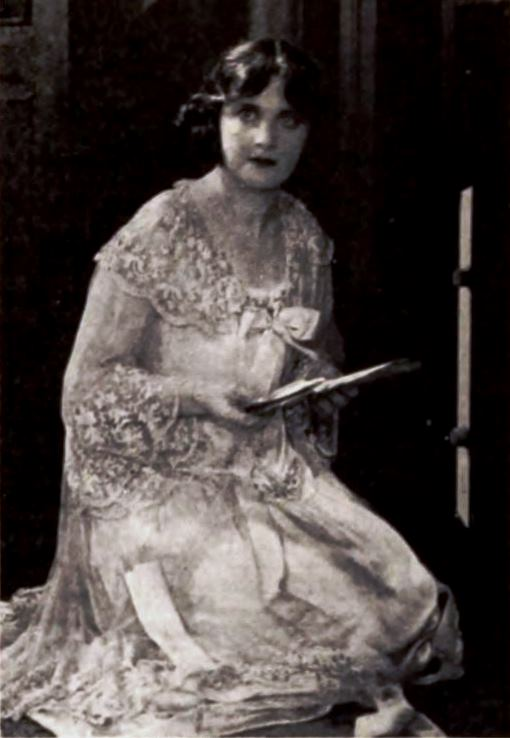
- Directed by: George L. Cox
- Written by: Lois Zellner
- Produced by: American Film Co. Samuel S. Hutchinson
- Starring: Margarita Fischer; Harry Hilliard
- Cinematography: George Rizard
- Distributed by: Pathé Exchange
- Release date: March 10, 1920
- Running time: 6 reels
- Country: USA
- Language: Silent..English intertitles

The Dangerous Talent is a lost 1920 silent film directed by George L. Cox and starring Margarita Fischer and Harry Hilliard. It was released by Pathé Exchange.

== Cast ==
- Margarita Fischer as Leila Mead
- Harry Hilliard as Gilbert Ellis
- Beatrice Van as Mildred Shedd
- Harvey Clark as Horton
- Neil Hardin as Bob Ames
- George Periolat as Peyton Dodge
- Mae Talbot as A Derelict
