= A Sporting Chance (1919 Pathe film) =

1919 US silent film by Henry King

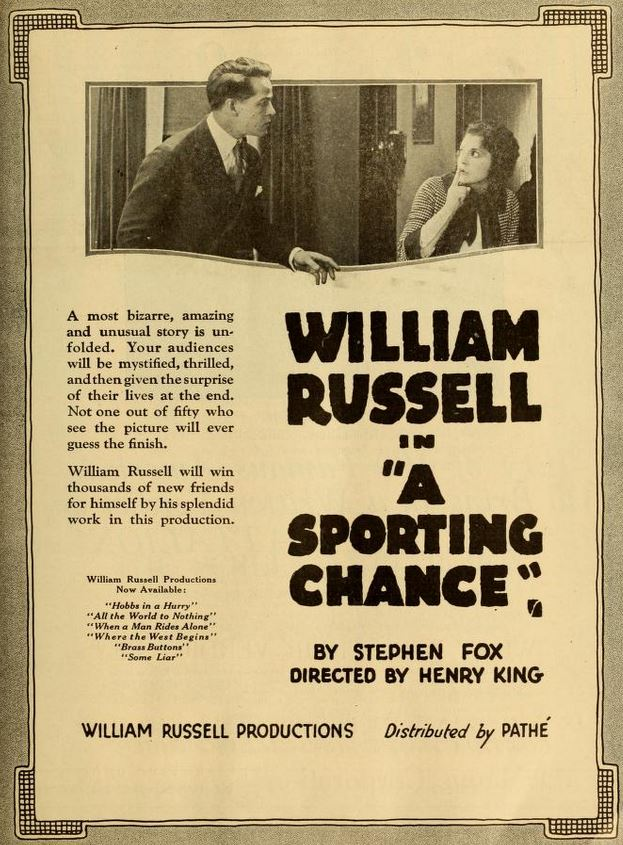
- advertisement
- Directed by: Henry King
- Written by: Stephen Fox (alias Jules Furthman)
- Produced by: William Russell
- Starring: William Russell
- Production company: William Russell Productions/American Film Company
- Distributed by: Pathé Exchange
- Release date: June 29, 1919
- Running time: 5 reels
- Country: United States
- Language: Silent (English intertitles)

A Sporting Chance is a surviving 1919 American silent drama film directed by Henry King and produced by starring William Russell. It was distributed through Pathé Exchange. It is not to be confused with another film released a month later by Paramount called A Sporting Chance starring Ethel Clayton which is lost.

== Cast ==
- William Russell as John Stonehouse
- Fritzi Brunette as Gilberte Bonheur
- George Periolat as Edward Craig
- J. Farrell MacDonald as Luther Ribley aka Kennedy
- Lee Hill as George Cornhill
- Harvey Clark as Aaron Witt
- Perry Banks as Anthony James

== Preservation status ==
- The film is still extant and available on DVD.
