= The House of Toys =

1920 silent film by George L. Cox

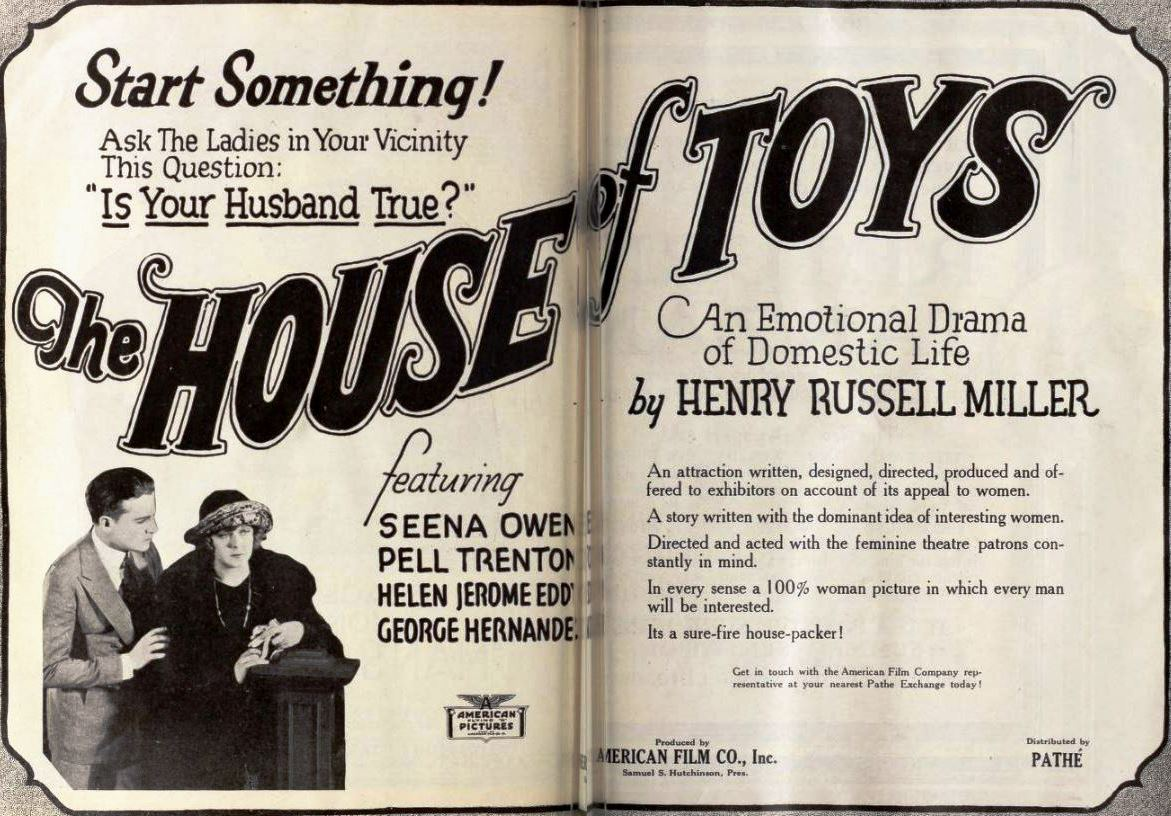
- Advertisement
- Directed by: George L. Cox
- Written by: Daniel F. Whitcomb
- Based on: The House of Toys by Henry Russell Miller
- Starring: Seena Owen; Pell Trenton; Helen Jerome Eddy
- Production company: American Film Company
- Distributed by: Pathé Exchange
- Release date: May 1920
- Running time: 60 minutes
- Country: United States
- Language: Silent (English intertitles)

The House of Toys is a 1920 American silent drama film directed by George L. Cox and starring Seena Owen, Pell Trenton, and Helen Jerome Eddy.

== Cast ==
- Seena Owen as Shirley Lord
- Pell Trenton as David Quentin
- Helen Jerome Eddy as Esther Summers
- Lillian Leighton as Aunt Clara
- George Hernandez as Jonathan Radbourne
- Stanhope Wheatcroft as Richard Holden
- Henry A. Barrows (Undetermined Role)
- Marian Skinner (Undetermined Role)
- William Buckley (Undetermined Role)
- Perry Banks (Undetermined Role)

== Bibliography ==
- Goble, Alan. The Complete Index to Literary Sources in Film. Walter de Gruyter, 1999.
