= Wives and Other Wives =

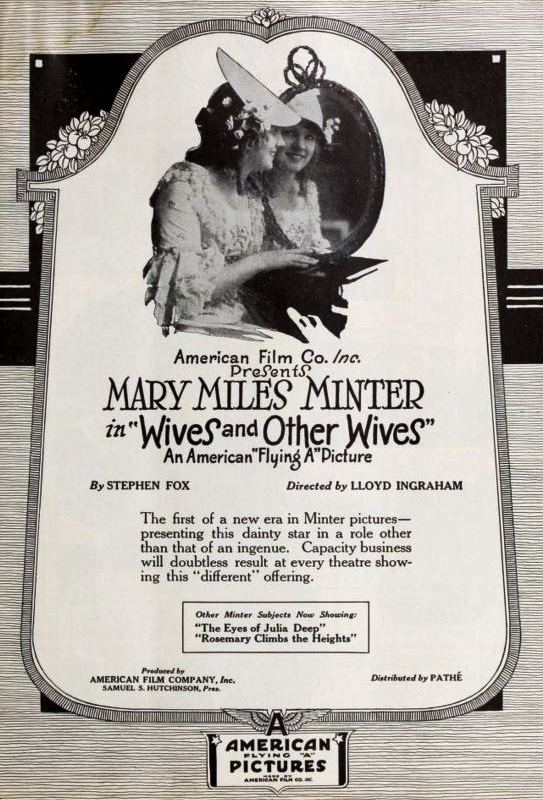
- Advertisement
- Directed by: Lloyd Ingraham
- Screenplay by: Stephen Fox
- Story by: Stephen Fox
- Starring: Mary Miles Minter; Colin Chase
- Production company: American Film Company
- Distributed by: Pathé Exchange
- Release date: December 15, 1918
- Running time: 5 reels
- Country: United States
- Language: Silent (English intertitles)

Wives and Other Wives is a 1918 American silent comedy-drama film directed by Lloyd Ingraham and starring Mary Miles Minter, based on a story by Jules Furthman. As with many of Minter's features, it is thought to be a lost film.

== Plot ==
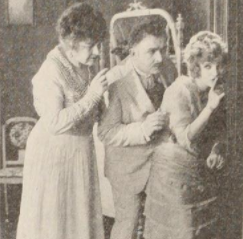
Mary Miles Minter and George Periolat in "Wives and Other Wives" (1918)

As described in various film magazine reviews, newly-married Robin Challoner (Minter) is upset by her husband Geoffrey (Chase) reading the newspaper at the breakfast table. Shutting herself in their bedroom, she begins to burn love letters from earlier in their relationship when her husband enters and offers to help her. Not realising that the letters are his, he is stricken with jealousy when Robin refuses to burn one particular package, and storms out of their apartment.

Meanwhile another couple, Mr. and Mrs. Craig, have been viewing the upstairs apartment. When Mrs. Craig (Shelby) leaves her wrap behind, she sends her husband Norman (Garwood) to retrieve it. He gets off the elevator on the wrong floor and enters the Challoner apartment by mistake, where Robin, mistaking him for a burglar, shoots at him. Mr. Craig faints from fright and Robin, thinking she has killed him, flees the apartment to seek a doctor. While she is gone, Geoffrey Challoner returns to find another man on the floor of his wife's bedroom. He refuses to listen to Robin's explanations, and decides to seek a divorce. Mrs. Craig, having also entered the apartment seeking her husband, declares that she too wants a divorce.

Judge Corcoran (Periolat), a friend of both couples, decides to intervene to help repair their relationships. He invites the Challoners to his country home for a visit, along with Mrs. Craig and another couple, the Doubledays. Mr. Craig decides to join them, but turns up somewhat the worse for wear, and falls asleep in Robin's room by mistake, where she screams upon the discovery that the man in her bed is not her husband. Meanwhile, Mr. Challoner has ended up in Mrs. Craig's room in error, and neither couple is any closer to reconciliation.

In the meantime, the Doubledays are plotting a fake jewellery robbery to cash in on an insurance policy. When some of the Judge's staff overhear them, they decide to steal the jewellery instead. While searching for clues to this robbery, the Judge finds the unburnt letters that Robin brought with her. Believing them to be a clue to the robbery, he places them in a drawer and announces to all present that he expects to see them exchanged for the jewellery before morning.

Eager to retrieve her letters, Robin plans to sneak into the Judge's study that night, as does her husband, who is still keen to know who wrote them. On her way to the study, Robin comes across the household staff, who are trying to escape with the jewellery. When the Judge is alerted, they admit to the robbery, but also reveal the Doubledays' planned fraud. Once the Doubledays have been expelled from the house, it is revealed that Geoffrey Challoner was the author of the letters all along, and both couples are happily reconciled.

== Cast ==
- Mary Miles Minter as Robin Challoner
- Colin Chase as Geoffrey Challoner
- George Periolat as Judge Corcoran
- William Garwood as Norman Craig
- Margaret Shelby as Mrs. Craig
- Virginia Ware as Mrs. Corcoran
- Carl Stockdale as Ted Doubleday
- Eugenie Forde as Mrs. Doubleday
- Marie Morledge as Rita
- John Gough as Higgins
