= The Week-End =

1920 silent film directed by George L. Cox

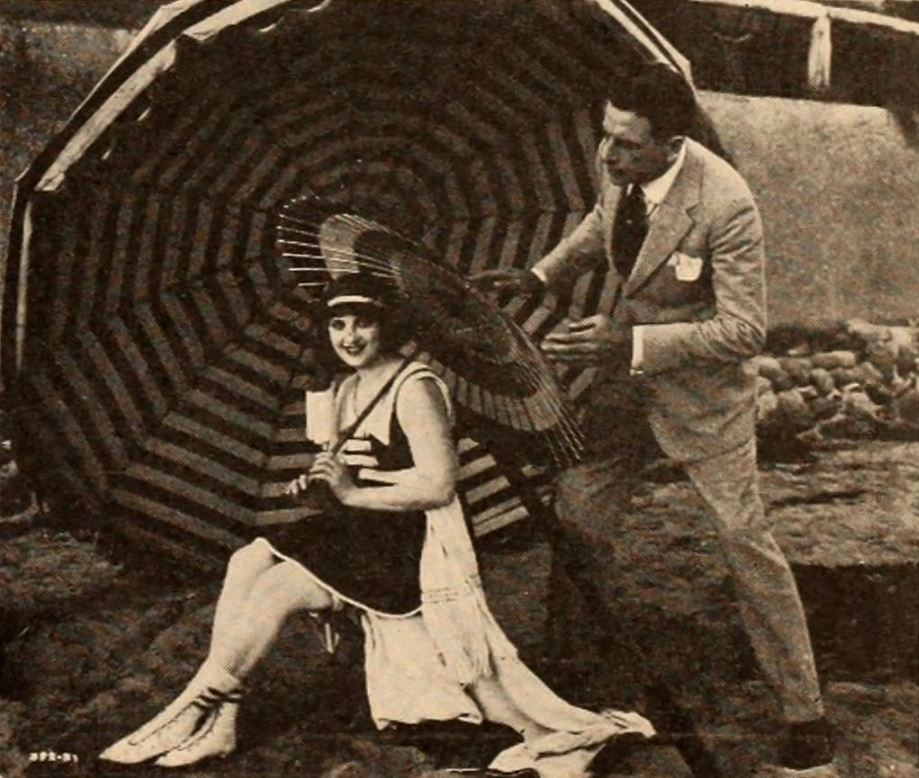
- Directed by: George L. Cox; Sidney Algier
- Written by: George L. Cox; Arthur J. Zellner; Cosmo Hamilton
- Produced by: Pathé Exchange
- Starring: Margarita Fischer
- Distributed by: Pathé Exchange
- Release date: July 1920
- Running time: 6 reels
- Country: United States
- Language: Silent (English intertitles)

The Week-End is a lost 1920 American silent comedy film directed by George L. Cox and starring Margarita Fischer and Milton Sills. It was produced and distributed by Pathé Exchange.

== Cast ==
- Margarita Fischer as Vera Middleton
- Milton Sills as Arthur Tavenor
- Bertram Grassby as Spencer Jardine
- Harvey Clark as Watt Middleton
- Mary Wise as Mrs. Watt Middleton
- Mayme Kelso as Mrs. Grace Maynard
- Beverly Travers as Mrs. Clara Churchill
- Harry Lonsdale as James Corbin
- Lillian Leighton as Mrs. James Corbin
