= The Valley of Tomorrow =

1920 film

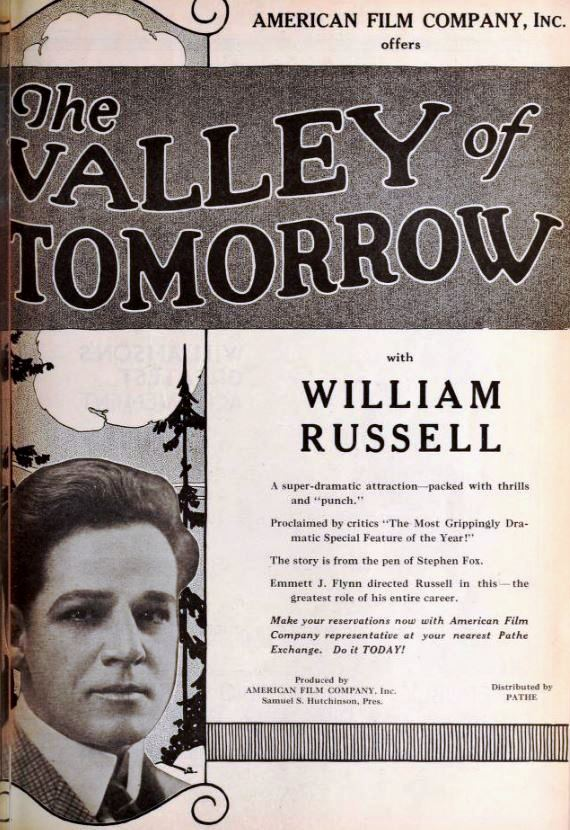
- Directed by: Emmett J. Flynn
- Written by: Jules Furthman
- Produced by: Samuel S. Hutchinson
- Starring: William Russell; Mary Thurman; Harvey Clark
- Cinematography: George Rizard
- Production company: American Film Company
- Distributed by: Pathé Exchange
- Release date: February 1920
- Running time: 60 minutes
- Country: United States
- Languages: Silent; English intertitles

The Valley of Tomorrow is a 1920 American silent drama film directed by Emmett J. Flynn and starring William Russell, Mary Thurman and Harvey Clark.

== Cast ==
- William Russell as Dabney Morgan
- Mary Thurman as Elenore Colonna
- Harvey Clark as Long John Morgan
- Fred Malatesta as Enrico Colonna
- Pauline Curley as Cecelia May Morgan
- Frank Brownlee as Fang Morgan
- Frank Clark as Caleb Turner
- Louis King as Jed Morgan

== Bibliography ==
- Connelly, Robert B. The Silents: Silent Feature Films, 1910-36, Volume 40, Issue 2. December Press, 1998.
