= The Gamesters =

1920 film

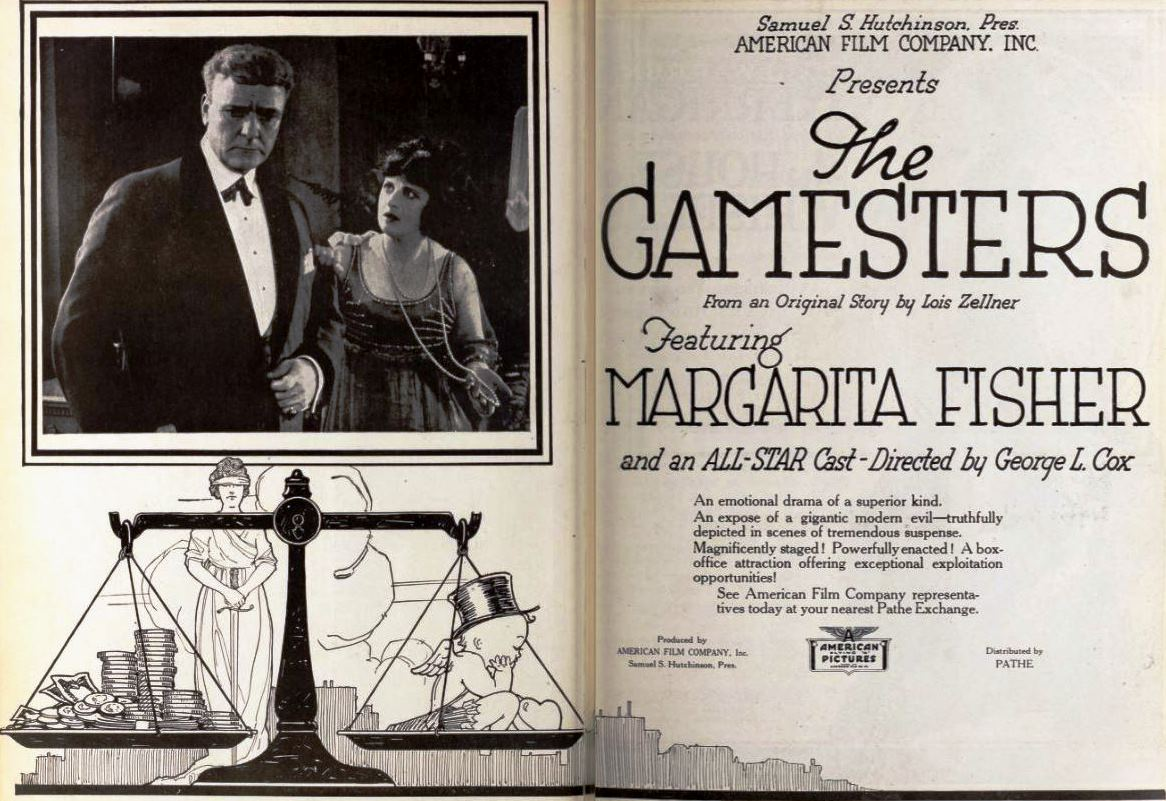
- Directed by: George L. Cox
- Written by: Lois Zellner
- Starring: Margarita Fischer; Hayward Mack; Lee Shumway
- Production company: American Film Company
- Distributed by: Pathe Exchange
- Release date: November 1920
- Running time: 50 minutes
- Country: United States
- Languages: Silent; English intertitles

The Gamesters is a 1920 American silent drama film directed by George L. Cox and starring Margarita Fischer, Hayward Mack and Lee Shumway.

== Cast ==
- Margarita Fischer as Rose
- Hayward Mack as Jim Welch
- Lee Shumway as Marshall Andrews
- P. Dempsey Tabler as Brad Bascom
- Evans Kirk as Paul Rosson
- Joseph Bennett as Harvey Blythe

== Bibliography ==
- Darby, William. Masters of Lens and Light: A Checklist of Major Cinematographers and Their Feature Films. Scarecrow Press, 1991.
- Munden, Kenneth White. The American Film Institute Catalog of Motion Pictures Produced in the United States, Part 1. University of California Press, 1997.
