= Rosemary Climbs the Heights =

1918 film directed by Lloyd Ingraham

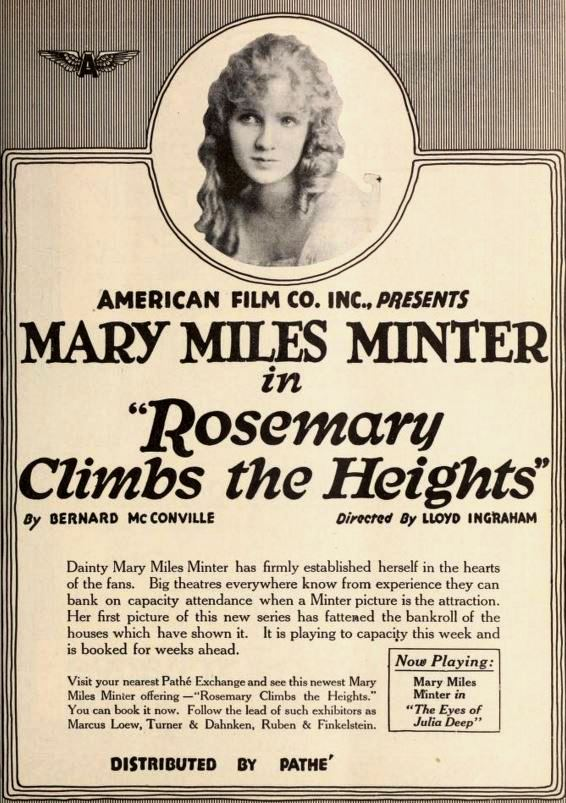
- Advertisement
- Directed by: Lloyd Ingraham
- Written by: Daniel F. Whitcomb
- Story by: Bernard McConville
- Starring: Mary Miles Minter; Allan Forrest; Margaret Shelby
- Production company: American Film Company
- Distributed by: Pathé Exchange
- Release date: October 13, 1918 (United States)
- Running time: 5 reels
- Country: United States
- Languages: Silent; English intertitles

Rosemary Climbs the Heights is a 1918 American silent drama film directed by Lloyd Ingraham and starring Mary Miles Minter, Allan Forrest, and Margaret Shelby. It is the only one of Minter's feature films not listed in the Library of Congress American Silent Feature Film Database, making its survival status difficult to ascertain.

== Plot ==
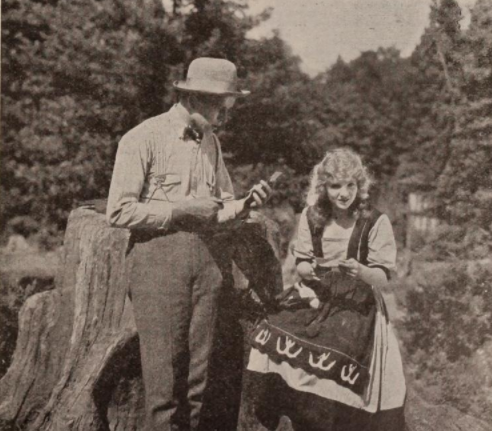
Mary Miles Minter in "Rosemary Climbs the Heights" (1918)

As described in film magazine reviews, Rosemary Van Voort is a girl with a talent for woodcarving, who lives in the Catskill mountains with her aging parents. One day, she meets a group of artists on a trip from New York. Impressed with her skills, they persuade Rosemary to return to New York with them to pursue her art.

One of these artists, the violinist Ricardo Fitzmaurice, falls in love with Rosemary. As Rosemary starts to earn money from her woodcarving, and Ricardo works on his opera, all seems promising for the couple, but another member of the artists' circle, Mme. Fedoreska, is also in love with Ricardo, and she becomes jealous when she realises that the young violinist only has eyes for Rosemary.

One night, when returning late from a dance, Rosemary is accosted by Mme. Fedoreska, who threatens to kill her. Ricardo intervenes, and he and Rosemary return to his quarters for the night, as Rosemary's friend Wanda has locked her out of their apartment. They are later joined there by a distressed young boy, but as he speaks only Russian, neither Rosemary nor Ricardo can discern the cause of his upset.

Meanwhile, Mme. Fedoreska is confronted by her estranged husband, whom she had abandoned in Siberia with their child. There is an argument and a gunshot, and in the morning, Mme. Fedoreska is found dead. Rosemary's pistol is found by the body, and with Ricardo having left early for Chicago to promote his opera, she has no one to provide her with an alibi. Rosemary is arrested and put on trial for murder.

Just when it seems that all is hopeless and that Rosemary has no means of proving her innocence, the little Russian boy that she had met on the night of the murder manages to convey that he had seen Mme. Fedoreska stabbed his father - her estranged husband, who later died from his wounds- and his father shot her. Rosemary is acquitted, and she and Ricardo look forward to a happy future together.

== Cast ==
- Mary Miles Minter as Rosemary Van Voort
- Allan Forrest as Ricardo Fitzmaurice
- Margaret Shelby as Wanda Held
- Charlotte Mineau as Mme. Thamar Fedoreska
- George Periolat as Godfrey Van Voort
- Nanine Wright as Hilda Van Voort
- Jack Farrell as Jacob Lowenstein
- Carl Stockdale as Andrieff
- Louis King as Cornelius Simpson
- Rosita Marstini as Mrs. Preston-Carr

== Bibliography ==
- Donald W. McCaffrey & Christopher P. Jacobs. Guide to the Silent Years of American Cinema. Greenwood Publishing, 1999. ISBN 0-313-30345-2
