= Harvey Clark (actor) =

American actor (1885–1938)

Harvey Thornton Clark
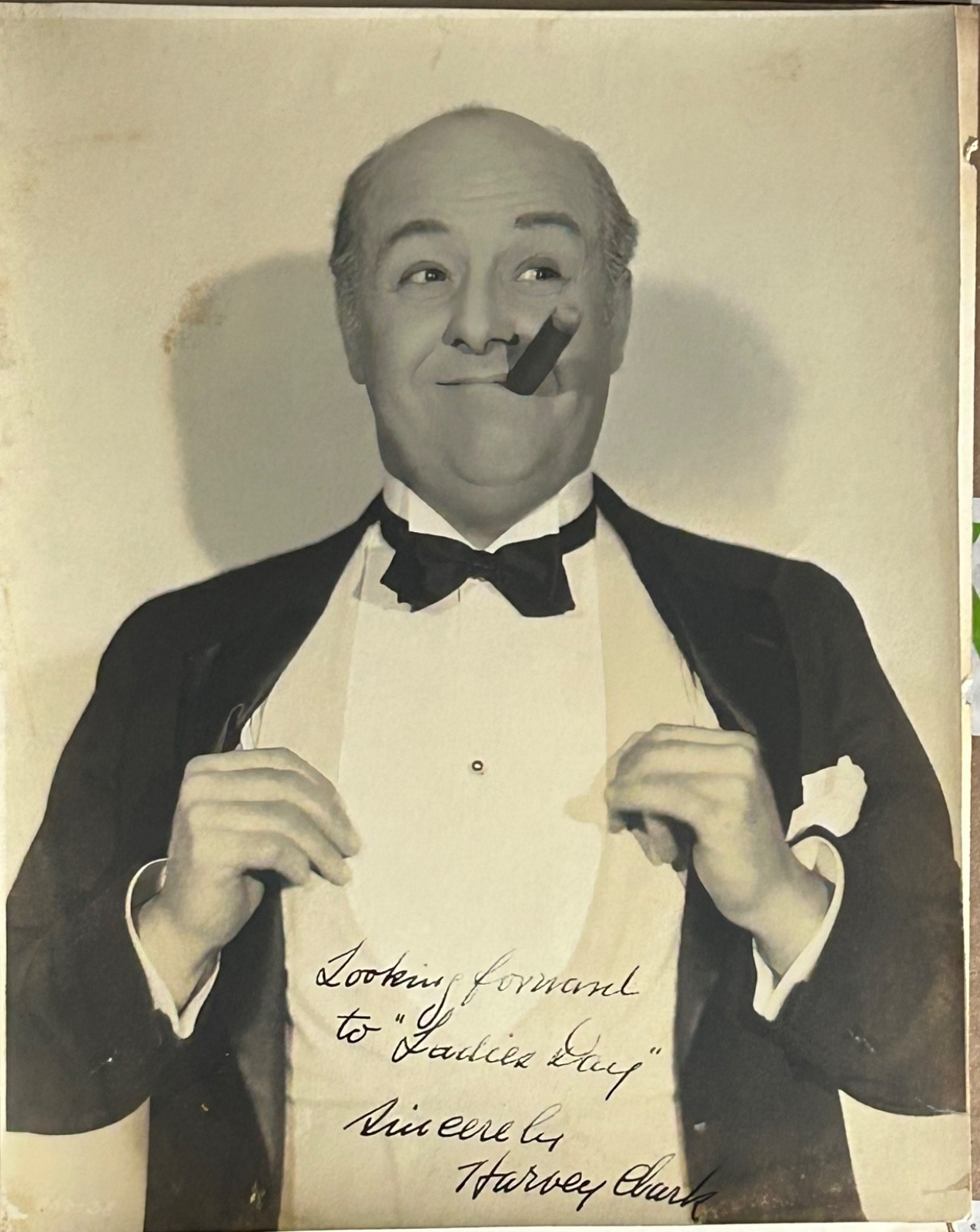
- Harvey Clark
- Born: October 4, 1885; Chelsea, Massachusetts, United States
- Died: July 19, 1938 (aged 52); Hollywood, California, United States
- Occupation: Actor
- Years active: 1915–1938

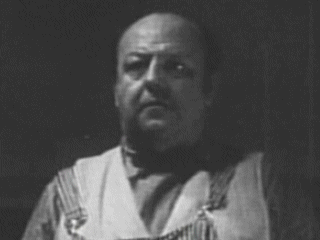
Clark in A Shriek in the Night (1933)

Harvey Thornton Clark (October 4, 1885 – July 19, 1938) was an American actor on stage and screen. He appeared in more than 200 films between 1915 and 1938. He was born in Chelsea, Massachusetts, and died in Hollywood, California, from a heart attack.

== Selected filmography ==
- The Darkening Trail (1915) - (uncredited)
- The Sign of the Spade (1916) - Old Deefy / James Fenton
- Honor Thy Name (1916) - Uncle Tobey
- The Gentle Intruder (1917) - Mr. Baxter
- Shifting Sands (1918)
- The Golden Fleece (1918)
- Love's Prisoner (1919)
- A Sporting Chance (1919)
- Prudence on Broadway (1919)
- Restless Souls (1919)
- The Dangerous Talent (1920)
- The Honey Bee (1920)
- The Valley of Tomorrow (1920)
- The Week-End (1920)
- An Arabian Knight (1920)
- The Servant in the House (1921)
- Payment Guaranteed (1921)
- Her Face Value (1921)
- The Kiss (1921)
- Shattered Idols (1922)
- The Woman He Loved (1922)
- The Gray Dawn (1922)
- Elope If You Must (1922)
- Thelma (1922)
- The Men of Zanzibar (1922)
- Don't Shoot (1922)
- Mixed Faces (1922)
- The Man Who Won (1923)
- Second Hand Love (1923)
- Secrets (1924)
- The Man Who Came Back (1924)
- He Who Gets Slapped (1924)
- Marriage in Transit (1925)
- Havoc (1925)
- The Fighting Heart (1925)
- Blue Blood (1925)
- The Frontier Trail (1926)
- Black Paradise (1926)
- The Cowboy and the Countess (1926)
- The Silver Treasure (1926)
- The Dixie Merchant (1926)
- The Devil's Partner (1926)
- Midnight Lovers (1926)
- McFadden's Flats (1927)
- Rose of the Golden West (1927)
- Putting Pants on Philip (1927)
- Camille (1927)
- The Magic Flame (1927)
- In Old Kentucky (1927)
- Get Your Man (1927)
- Ladies' Night in a Turkish Bath (1928)
- Beautiful But Dumb (1928)
- The Tragedy of Youth (1928)
- A Woman Against the World (1928)
- The Night Bird (1928)
- The Floating College (1928)
- The Olympic Hero (1928)
- The Toilers (1928)
- What a Man! (1930)
- Man of the World (1931)
- A Woman of Experience (1931)
- The Deceiver (1931)
- Those We Love (1932)
- A Shriek in the Night (1933)
- Alice in Wonderland (1933; scene deleted)
- Charlie Chan's Courage (1934)
- Three Godfathers (1936)
- Empty Saddles (1936)
- Gentle Julia (1936)
- Sitting on the Moon (1936)
- Blonde Trouble (1937)
- It's Love I'm After (1937)
- Law for Tombstone (1937)
- Boss of Lonely Valley (1937)
- Counsel for Crime (1937) (uncredited)
- Mother Carey's Chickens (1938)
