= Margarita Fischer =

American actress

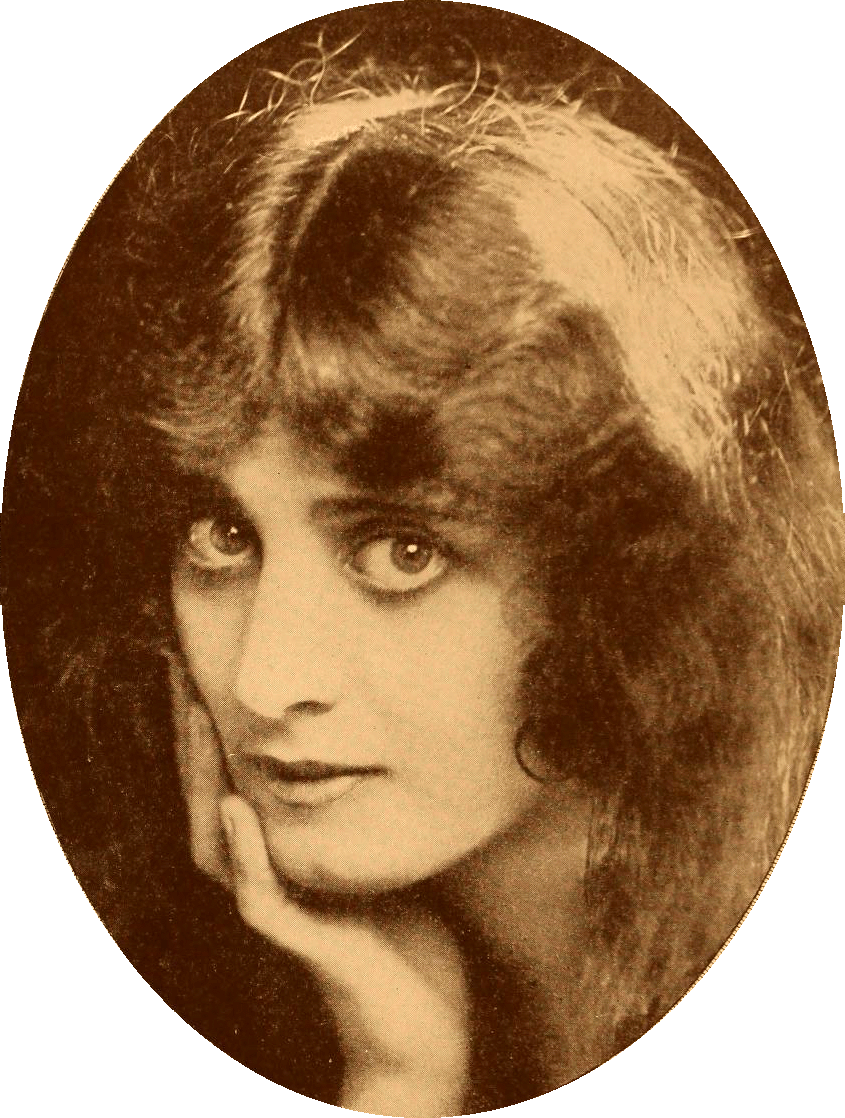
- Moving Picture World, 1917
- Born: Margarita Fischer; February 12, 1886; Missouri Valley, Iowa, U.S.
- Died: March 11, 1975 (aged 89); Encinitas, California, U.S.
- Resting place: Forest Lawn Memorial Park
- Other names: Margarieta Fisher; Margarite Fisher; Margurita Fisher; Margarita Pollard
- Occupation: Actress
- Years active: 1901-1927
- Spouse: Harry A. Pollard (m. 1911; died 1934)

Margarita Fisher (née Fischer, February 12, 1886 – March 11, 1975) was an American actress in silent motion pictures and stage productions. Newspapers sometimes referred to her as "Babe" Fischer.

== Early life ==
Margarita Fischer was born on February 12, 1886, in Missouri Valley, Iowa, although a 1902 newspaper article referred to her as "a native of Silverton, Marion County", in Oregon. Her parents were Johan (later John), a first-generation German-American hotelkeeper, and later noted minstrel, and Katherine "Kate" E. Fischer (née Hageny). She had an older sister, Dorothy, who was two years older and acted in productions with her in their childhood.

== Theater ==
As a child performer, and later as an ingenue star of the stage, Fischer was widely regarded in stock company groups of the Pacific Coast. When she was eight years old, a theatrical manager began using her in "heavy dramatic roles". Billed as "The Wonder Child", she continued in that pattern for several years. Fischer made her stage debut in Portland, Oregon, in the child role of Adrienne in The Celebrated Case. In 1901, she became the leading lady for the Fischer-Van Cleve Company. Her rapidly growing popularity led to her father forming the Margarita Fischer Stock Company. The theatrical group toured up and down the Pacific Coast for a number of years. After her father's death, Fischer acted in several stock companies, including one headed by Grace George.

After Fischer began performing in vaudeville, she met her eventual husband, film director Harry A. Pollard. They formed a team that performed the sketch "When Hearts Are Trumps" in "the principal vaudeville circuits". Some years later the two met again, as actors with the Selig Polyscape Company, with the Imp Company in New York, New York, and even later, with Universal Pictures.

== Motion pictures ==
When Fischer left vaudeville, she began working in films for the Selig Polyscope Company in Chicago. She was in Hollywood silent films from at least 1910 until 1927. Her first screen experience began with the American Company. There followed 3 years as a leading woman for Universal. In 1913 she starred in How Men Propose written and directed by Lois Weber for Universal, which at the time was still based on the east coast. When the American Beauty Company was organized she was engaged for each of the star feminine roles.

She is well known for her role as an African-American slave girl in the Harriet Beecher Stowe three-reel epic Uncle Tom's Cabin. She was co-featured with Harry Pollard in this Universal feature. It was in this role, as Eliza, that Fischer won a long-term contract with the American Film Company in Santa Barbara, California. She received international acclaim as the American Beauty of the screen. Her face was pictured in the heart of a rose, which became one of the movie's trade marks. Pollard directed the Universal superproduction of Uncle Tom's Cabin which was released in 1927. This time Margarita was cast in the more mature role of Eliza.

Other of her motion pictures of note include Lost: A Union Suit (1914), A Joke On Jane (1914), The Quest (1915), Robinson Crusoe (1917), Impossible Susan (1918), Trixie From Broadway (1919), The Thirtieth Piece of Silver (1920), and Any Woman (1925). In April 1916 Fischer and her husband launched the Pollard Picture Plays Corporation. Pollard directed, Margarita acted, and director/producer George W. Lederer was their protégé. Their initial production was The Pearl of Paradise. It was staged in Los Angeles, Honolulu, and the South Sea Islands.

== Later years and death ==
During World War I Fischer changed the spelling of her last name to Fisher because of the anti-German sentiment in America. She is sometimes credited as Margarieta Fisher, Marguerite Fisher, Margarite Fisher, and Margurita Fisher.

In 1944, she was living in San Diego and was a registered Republican.

Fischer died in Encinitas, California of heart disease in 1975. She was interred at Forest Lawn Memorial Park.

== Gallery ==
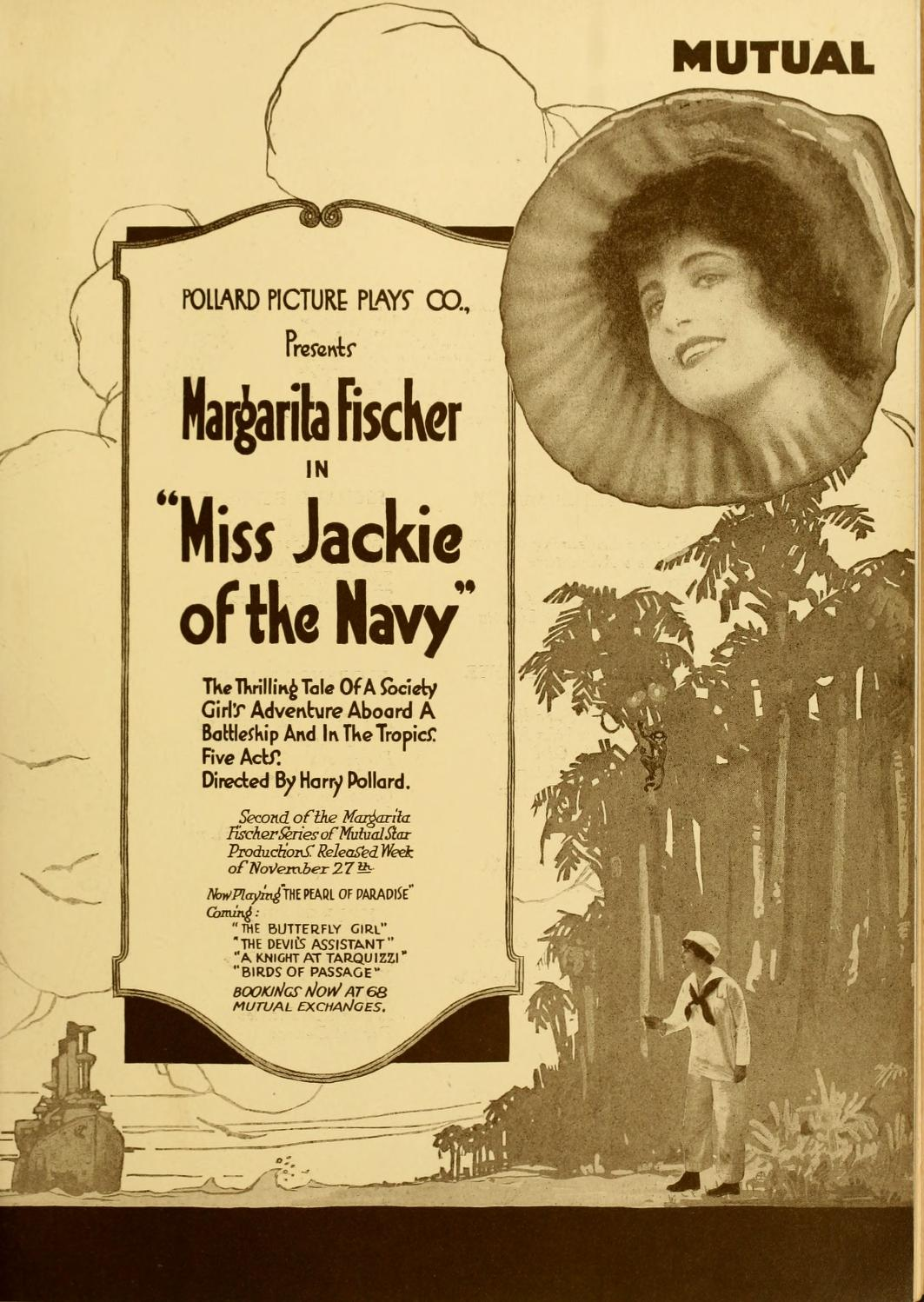
Miss Jackie of the Navy (1916)

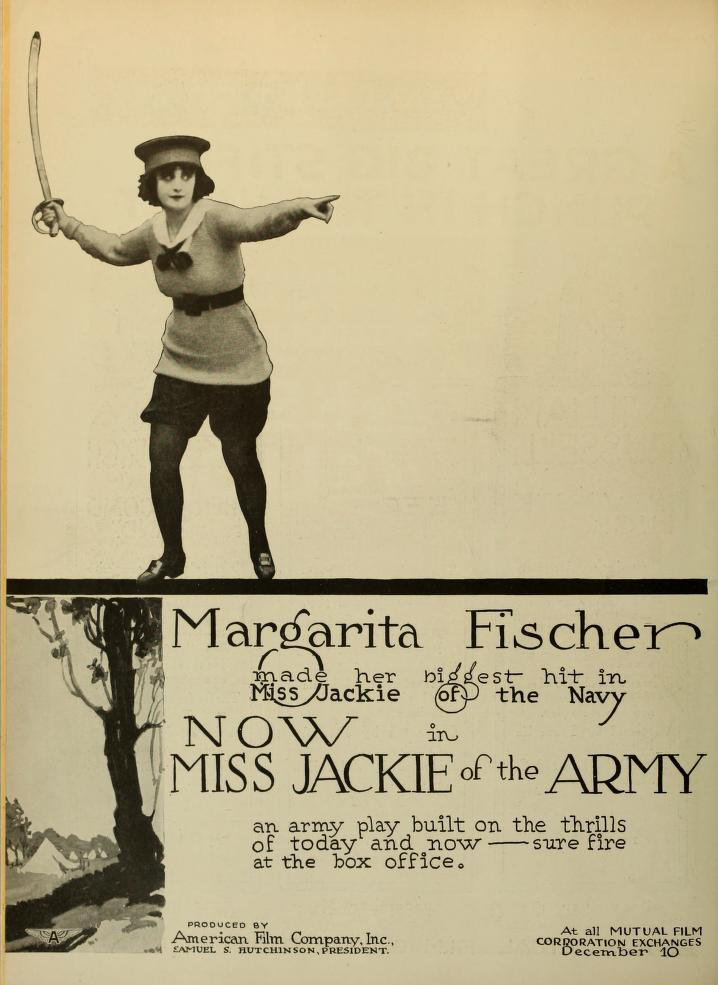
Miss Jackie of the Army (1917)

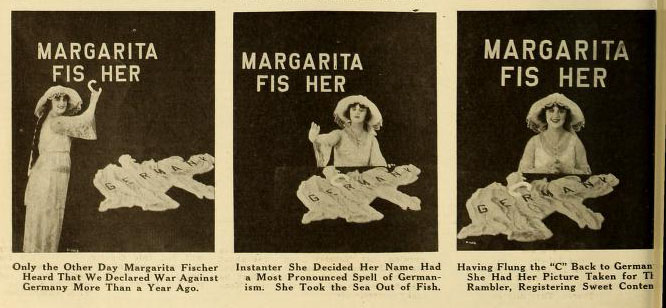
Name change during the war.

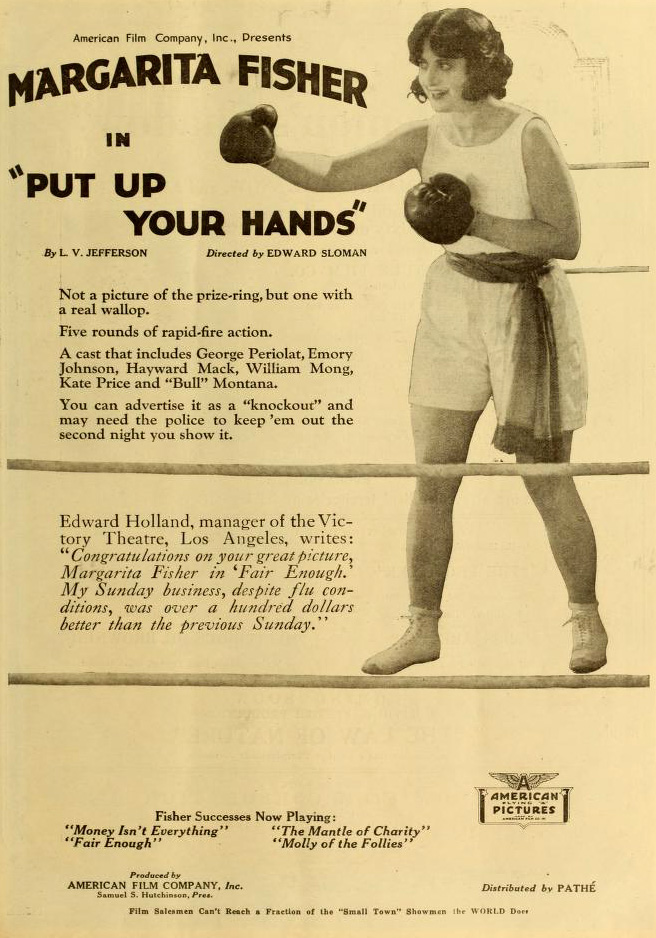
Put Up Your Hands (1919)

== Filmography ==
- There, Little Girl, Don't Cry (1910)*short
- Trimming of Paradise Gulch (1910)*short
- After Many Years (1910)*short
- Romeo and Juliet in Our Town (1910)*short
- The Way of the Red Man (1910)*short
- The Cowboy's Strategem (1910)*short
- His First Long Dress (1910)*short
- The Road to Richmond (1910)*short
- Big Medicine (1910)*short
- The Kentucky Pioneer (1910)*short
- For Her Country's Sake (1910)*short
- Settled Out of Court (1910)*short
- The Early Settlers (1910)*short
- The Vampire (1910)*short
- The Merry Wives of Windsor (1910)*short
- Two Lucky Jims (1910)*short
- In the Wilderness (1910)*short
- The Squaw and the Man (1910)*short
- The Tenderfoot's Round-Up (1911)*short
- An Arizona Romance (1911)*short
- Buddy, the Little Guardian (1911)*short
- Bertie's Bandit (1911)*short
- The Mission in the Desert (1911)*short
- The Sheriff's Sweetheart (1911)*short
- Over the Hills (1911)*short
- The Girl and the Half-Back (1911)*short
- A Pair of Gloves (1911)*short
- The Portrait (1911)*short
- A Lesson to Husbands (1911)*short
- The Trinity (1912)*short
- The Worth of a Man (1912)*short
- Mrs. Matthews, Dressmaker (1912)*short
- Who Wears Them? (1912)*short
- The Rose of California (1912)*short
- The Call of the Drum (1912)*short
- Better Than Gold (1912)*short
- The Baby (1912)*short
- Squnk City Fire Company (1912)*short
- Where Paths Meet (1912)*short
- The Dove and the Serpent (1912)*short
- A Melodrama of Yesterday (1912)*short
- On the Shore (1912)*short
- The Land of Promise (1912)*short
- Jim's Atonement (1912)*short
- The Return of Captain John (1912)*short
- Nothing Shall Be Hidden (1912)*short
- Love, War and a Bonnet (1912)*short
- The Parson and the Medicine Man (1912)*short
- Hearts in Conflict (1912)*short
- The Hand of Mystery (1912)*short
- Big Hearted Sim (1912)*short
- Her Burglar (1912)*short
- On the Border Line (1912)*short
- The Exchange of Labels (1912)*short
- The Employer's Liability (1912)*short
- Betty's Bandit (1912)*short
- The Tribal Law (1912)*short
- A Fight for Friendship (1912)*short
- Trapped by Fire (1912)*short
- The Regeneration of Worthless Dan (1912)*short
- An Indian Outcast (1912)*short
- Romance and Reality (1912)*short
- The Rights of a Savage (1912)*short
- The Mountain Girl's Self-Sacrifice (1912)*short
- The Old Folks' Christmas (1912)*short
- The Great Ganton Mystery (1913)
- Until Death (1913)*short
- A Friend of the Family (1913)*short
- The Wayward Sister (1913)*short
- The Turn of the Tide (1913)*short
- In Slavery Days (1913)*short
- The Boob (1913)*short
- The World at Large (1913)*short
- The Shadow (1913)*short
- The Stolen Idol (1913)*short
- Draga, the Gypsy (1913)*short
- A Woman's Folly (1913)*short
- A Wrong Road (1913)*short
- Robinson Cruesoe (1913)*short
- The Power of Heredity (1913)*short
- When the Prince Arrived (1913)*short
- Sally Scraggs, Housemaid (1913)*short
- Uncle Tom's Cabin (1913)*short
- A Woman's Stratagem (1913)*short
- The Evil Power (1913)*short
- The Light Woman (1913)*short
- The Diamond Makers (1913)*short
- The Fight Against Evil (1913)*short
- Paying the Price (1913)*short
- Shon the Piper (1913)*short
- Like Darby and Joan (1913)*short
- The Thumb Print (1913)*short
- The Primeval Test (1913)*short
- The Missionary Box (1913)*short
- His Old-Fashioned Dad (1913)*short
- A Tale of the Lonely Coast (1913)*short
- The Boob's Dream Girl (1913)*short
- Withering Roses (1914)*short
- Fooling Uncle (1914)*short
- Bess, the Outcast (1914)*short
- Sally's Elopement (1914)*short
- The Wife (1914)*short
- The Sacrifice (1914)*short
- The Professor's Awakening (1914)*short
- Italian Love (1914)*short
- Closed at Ten (1914)*short
- The Girl Who Dared (1914)*short
- The Peacock Feather Fan (1914)*short
- Sweet Land of Liberty (1914)*short
- Retribution (1914)*short
- Mlle. La Mode (1914)*short
- The Man Who Came Back (1914)*short
- A Flurry in Hats (1914)*short
- Eugenics Versus Love (1914)*short
- Her Heritage (1914)*short
- The Courting of Prudence (1914)*short
- Jane, the Justice (1914)*short
- Drifting Hearts (1914)*short
- Nancy's Husband (1914)*short
- The Dream Ship (1914)*short
- The Tale of a Tailor (1914)*short
- Via the Fire Escape (1914)*short
- The Other Train (1914)*short
- A Joke on Jane (1914)*short
- Her 'Really' Mother (1914)*short
- A Midsummer's Love Tangle (1914)*short
- A Suspended Ceremony (1914)*short
- Suzanna's New Suit (1914)*short
- The Silence of John Gordon (1914)*short
- Susie's New Shoes (1914)*short
- A Modern Othello (1914)*short
- The Motherless Kids (1914)*short
- The Only Way (1914)*short
- Caught in a Tight Pinch (1914)*short
- The Legend of Black Rock (1914)*short
- Nieda (1914)*short
- Motherhood (1914)*short
- When Queenie Came Back (1914)*short
- Cupid and a Dress Coat (1914)*short
- The Quest (1914)
- The Lonesome Heart (1915)
- The Girl from His Town (1915)
- Infatuation (1915)
- The Miracle of Life (1915)
- The Dragon (1916)
- The Pearl of Paradise (1916)
- Miss Jackie of the Navy (1916)
- The Butterfly Girl (1917)
- The Diamond Thieves (1917)*short
- Robinson Cruesoe (1917)*short
- The Sin Unatoned (1917)*short
- The Human Flame (1917)*short
- The Devil's Assistant (1917)
- The Girl Who Couldn't Grow Up (1917)
- Miss Jackie of the Army (1917)
- Molly Go Get 'Em (1918)
- Jilted Janet (1918)
- Ann's Finish (1918)
- The Primitive Woman (1918)
- The Square Deal (1918)
- Impossible Susan (1918)
- Money Isn't Everything (1918)
- Fair Enough (1918)
- The Mantle of Charity (1918)
- Molly of the Follies (1919)
- Put Up Your Hands! (1919)
- Charge It to Me (1919)
- Trixie from Broadway (1919)
- The Tiger Lily (1919)
- The Hellion (1919)
- The Dangerous Talent (1920)
- The Thirtieth Piece of Silver (1920)
- The Week-End (1920)
- Their Mutual Child (1921)
- The Gamesters (1920)
- Payment Guaranteed (1921)
- Beach of Dreams (1921)
- K – The Unknown (1924)
- Any Woman (1925)
- Uncle Tom's Cabin (1927)
