= Gertrude Le Brandt =

American actress

- Born: July 1, 1863; Illinois
- Died: August 28, 1955 (aged 92); Hollywood, California
- Occupation: Film actress

Gertrude Le Brandt (July 1, 1863 in Illinois – August 28, 1955 in Hollywood) was an American silent film actress.

She entered film in 1916 in Youth's Endearing Charm with actors such as Mary Miles Minter and Harry von Meter.

== Filmography ==
- Mama's Affair (1921) as Bundy
- Wild Oats (1919)
- Through the Toils (1919) as Mrs. Tressler
- Doing Their Bit (1918) as Bridget McCann O'Dowd
- Rose of the World (1918) as Mary
- Melissa of the Hills (1917) as Mrs. Sanders
- Annie-for-Spite (1917) as Mrs. J.G. Nottingham
- A Dream or Two Ago (1916)
- Faith (1916) as Mrs. Stimson
- Dulcie's Adventure (1916)
- Youth's Endearing Charm (1916) as Mrs. Disbrow
