= Charlotte Shelby =

American actress (1877–1957)

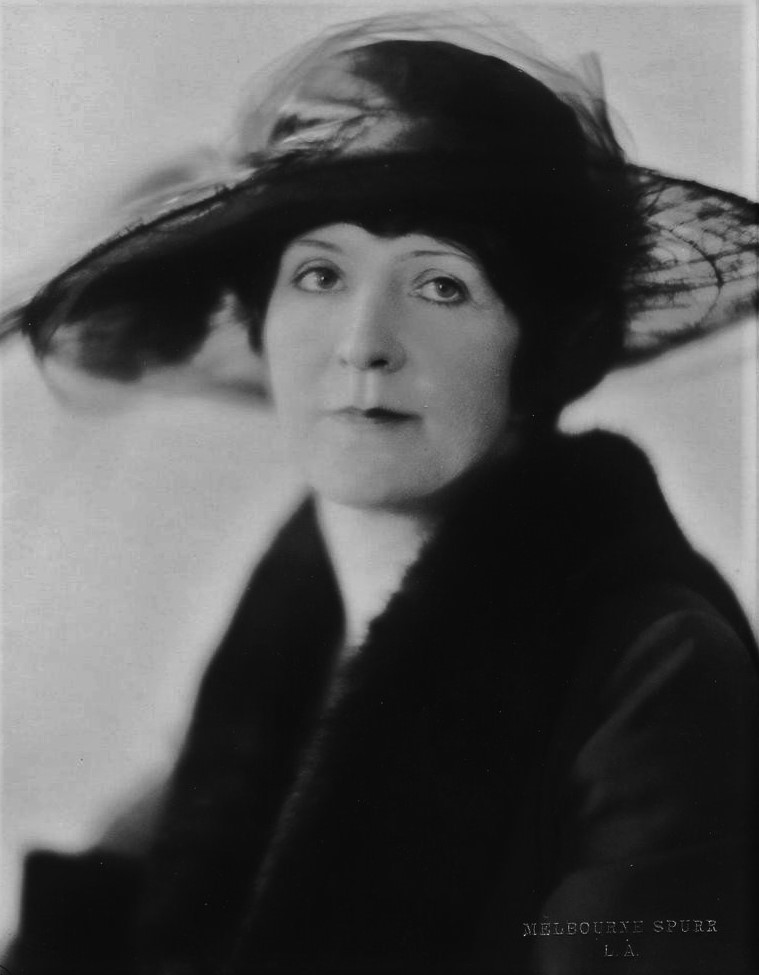
- Shelby in 1923
- Born: Lily Pearl Miles; December 19, 1877; Shreveport, Louisiana, U.S.
- Died: March 13, 1957 (aged 79); Santa Monica, California, U.S.
- Occupation: Actress
- Years active: 1915–1916
- Spouse: J. Homer Reilly
- Children: Mary Miles Minter; Margaret Shelby

Charlotte Shelby (born Lily Pearl Miles; December 19, 1877 – March 13, 1957) was an American actress. She was popular in Broadway theatre in her youth and was long noted as a suspect in the murder of Hollywood director William Desmond Taylor.

== Stage mother to scandal ==
Shelby was the mother of actresses Mary Miles Minter and Margaret Shelby. She reportedly was domineering and manipulative in the management of her daughters' Broadway and film careers. Shelby was widely mentioned as a suspect in the murder of Hollywood director William Desmond Taylor, whom she incorrectly believed was involved romantically with her daughter Mary Miles Minter (born Juliet Reilly).

The theory developed via the discovery, shortly after Taylor's murder, of love letters 19-year-old Minter had written to him. It is now believed that Minter's infatuation with Taylor (who was 30 years her senior) was unrequited, and there is no evidence that he returned her romantic affections.

The Taylor murder was followed by sensationalized and often fabricated newspaper reports which fed years of scandal. Shelby owned a .38 calibre revolver along with unusual bullets similar to the one which had killed Taylor. When this became public years later, she reportedly threw the pistol into a Louisiana bayou. Shelby was acquainted socially with the Los Angeles county district attorney and spent many years in Europe, both to escape the efforts of his successor to question her and avoid much adverse press attention. Almost 20 years after the murder, Los Angeles district attorney Buron Fitts concluded there wasn't any evidence for an indictment of Shelby and recommended that the remaining evidence and case files be retained on a permanent basis (all of these materials subsequently disappeared). In 1999, it was reported that in 1964 actress Margaret Gibson made a deathbed confession to Taylor's murder; however no independent confirmation has emerged.

For many years, she and her daughters were entangled in bitter disputes over how she had handled their earnings as young actresses. Margaret died of alcohol-related illness in 1939 but Mary reconciled fully with her mother. Charlotte Shelby died in Santa Monica, California in 1957. She originally was buried in a private and locked section at Forest Lawn Memorial Park, Glendale. Mary Miles Minter later had her mother's remains, along with those of her sister Margaret, cremated and scattered.

== Filmography ==
Year	Title	Role	Notes
1915	The Fairy and the Waif		
1915	Always in the Way	Mrs. Goodwin	
1916	Dimples	Mrs. Riley	

== Theater ==
- Love Watches (1908)
