= Margaret Shelby =

American actress (1900–1939)

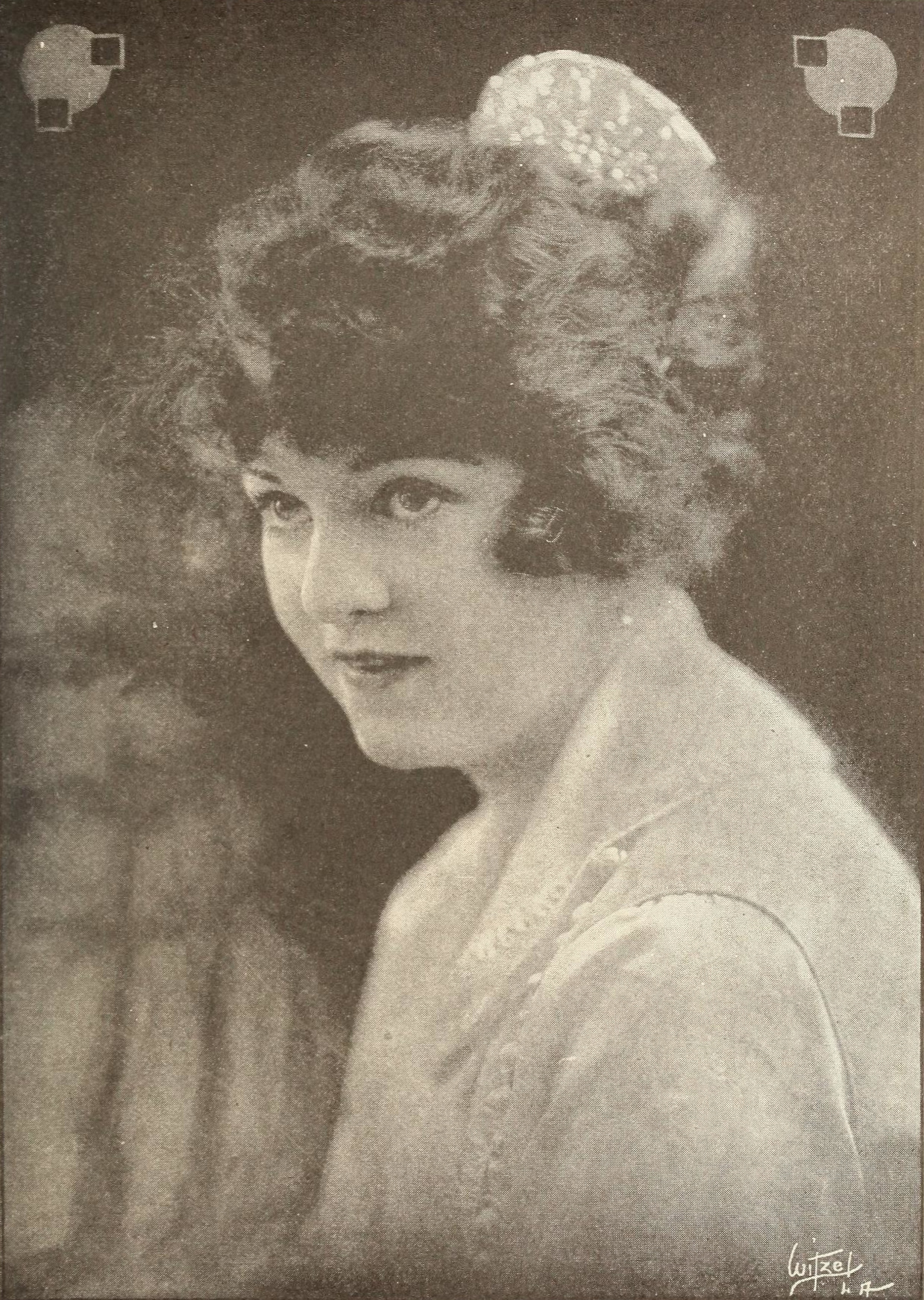
- Shelby in 1918
- Born: Alma Margaret Reilly; June 16, 1900; San Antonio, Texas, U.S.
- Died: December 21, 1939 (aged 39); Los Angeles, California, U.S.
- Resting place: Forest Lawn Memorial Park (Glendale)
- Other name: Alma M. Fillmore
- Occupation: Actress
- Years active: 1912–1924
- Spouses: Hugh Fillmore (m. 1925; div. 1927) Emmett J. Flynn (m. 1937; ann. 1937)
- Mother: Charlotte Shelby
- Relatives: Mary Miles Minter (sister)

Alma Margaret Reilly (June 16, 1900 – December 21, 1939), known professionally as Margaret Shelby, was an American stage and motion picture actress, daughter of actress Charlotte Shelby, older sister of silent film star Mary Miles Minter, and one of many public figures noted in the scandals which followed the murder of William Desmond Taylor in 1922.

== Film career ==
Born Alma Margaret Reilly (and later also known as Alma M. Fillmore), Shelby was a child actress. Her first Broadway appearance was in Grace Livingston Furniss's play, The Fibber. In 1916 Margaret and Mary, both in their teens, acted together on film in director James Kirkwood's picture Faith.

Although she was seen as pretty and noted for having some talent as an actress, her film career was limited to supporting roles in some of her sister's films. By 1916, both sisters were quite famous and established a widely-publicized "hotel" for stray dogs on the ample grounds of their Santa Barbara, California home.

Her sister left the film industry in 1924, and Margaret took small bit parts in sundry productions.

== Personal life ==
She was briefly married to Hugh Fillmore, but they divorced in 1927. With the coming of sound films in the late 1920s, her career ended. By the late 1930s, Shelby was suffering from both alcoholism and clinical depression. In March 1937, she eloped to Yuma, Arizona with Emmett J. Flynn, but this marriage was annulled two months later.

On June 5, 1937 Shelby filed a lawsuit against her mother alleging financial mismanagement, claiming Charlotte had stolen $48,750 (roughly almost $2 million in 2007 inflation-adjusted terms) from a safety deposit box in a Los Angeles, California bank. A jury awarded her $20,000. On September 13, 1938, she publicly accused her mother of having killed William Desmond Taylor in 1922. Shelby's sister had an unrequited infatuation with Taylor, beginning in 1919.

== Death ==
Margaret Shelby died following a long illness in 1939, aged 39.

== Filmography ==
Year	Title	Role	Notes
1912	Billie	Billie	
1916	Faith	Laura	aka The Virtuous Outcast
1917	Peggy Leads the Way	Maude Greenwood	
1917	Her Country's Call	Marie Tremaine	
1917	Environment	Mildred Holcombe	
1918	Wives and Other Wives	Mrs. Craig	
1918	Rosemary Climbs the Heights	Wanda Held	
1919	A Bachelor's Wife	Genevieve Harbison	
1919	The Intrusion of Isabel	Lois Randall	
1919	The Amazing Impostor	Countess of Crex	
1920	Jenny Be Good	Jolanda Van Mater	
1928	Clothes Make the Woman		

== See also ==
- Ella Margaret Gibson
