= Nurse Marjorie =

1920 film by William Desmond Taylor

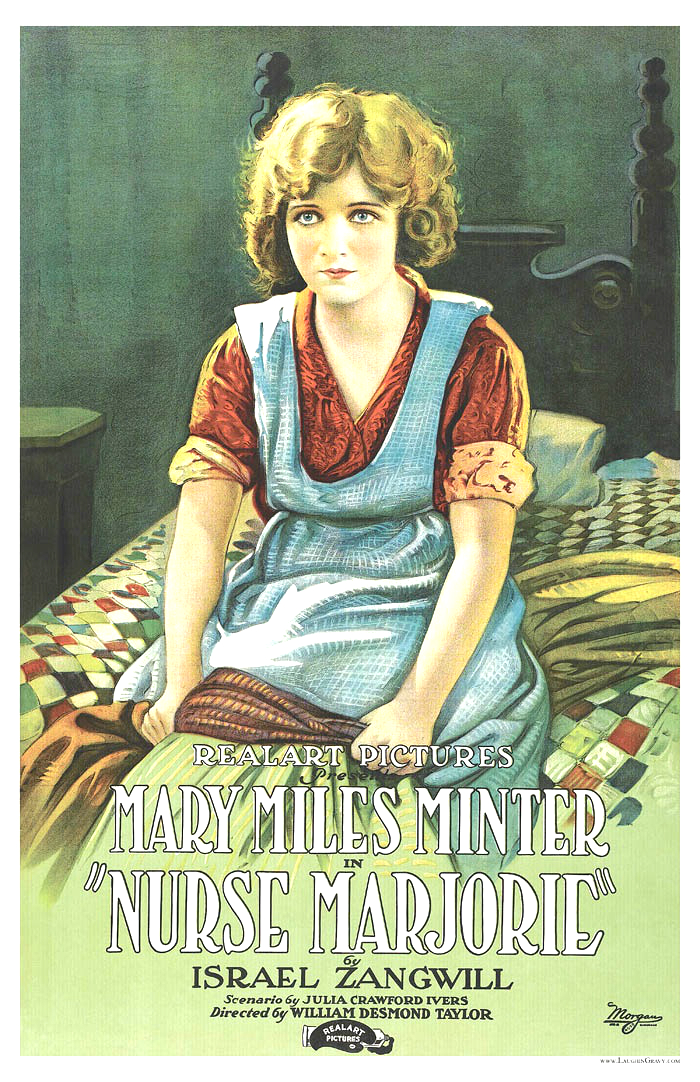
- Film poster
- Directed by: William Desmond Taylor
- Written by: Julia Crawford Ivers (adaptation, scenario)
- Based on: Nurse Marjorie by Israel Zangwill
- Starring: Mary Miles Minter
- Cinematography: James Van Trees
- Production company: Realart Pictures Corporation
- Distributed by: Realart Pictures Corporation
- Release date: April 4, 1920
- Running time: 6 reels
- Country: United States
- Language: Silent (English intertitles)

Nurse Marjorie is a 1920 American silent drama film directed by William Desmond Taylor and starring Mary Miles Minter. Based on a 1906 play, Nurse Marjorie, by Israel Zangwill, with a scenario by Julia Crawford Ivers, it is one of approximately a dozen of Minter's films known to survive today, and one of even fewer readily available for the general public to view.

== Plot ==
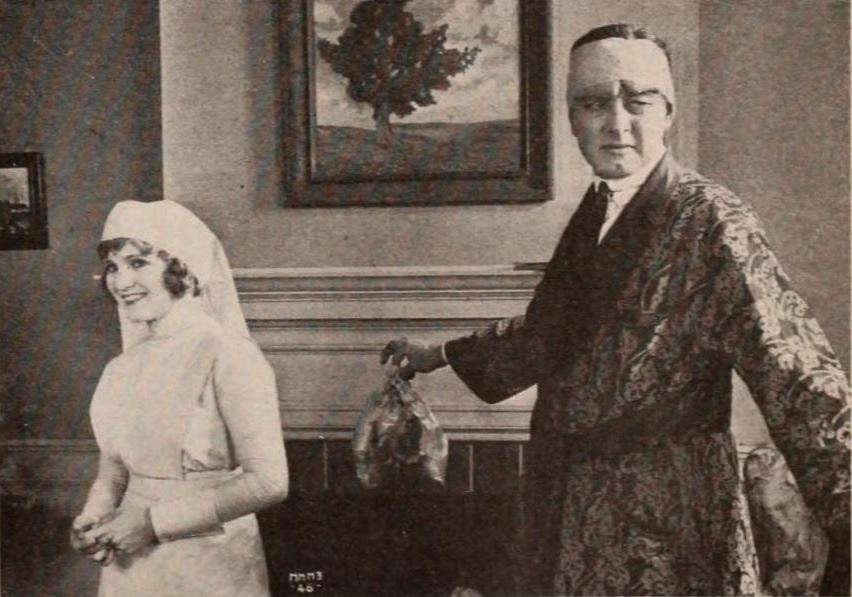
Mary Miles Minter and Clyde Fillmore in "Nurse Marjorie" (1920)

As well as being readily available to view, the plot is described in various film magazine summaries and reviews.

Lady Marjorie Killonan is the headstrong Anglo-Irish daughter of the Duke and Duchess of Donegal. She has recently completed charitable work nursing the poor, but now intends to become a professional nurse to the rich. Her mother does not consider this an acceptable role for someone of her status, but her father is more supportive of her ambitions. In addition, her mother hopes to wed Marjorie to Lord Fitztrevor, but a clearly disinterested Marjorie tells the lord that he must wait for her answer until she returns from her nursing work.

At the hospital, Marjorie's first two patients are Dick, a young orphan boy with a broken leg, and John Danbury, a Labour MP who has undergone an operation to correct a squint. Dick is smitten with Marjorie at first sight, but due to the homely nurse who attended to him before his operation, Danbury believes Marjorie to be exceedingly unattractive, and will not let her care for him. He quickly realises his error once his dressings are removed, and immediately falls in love with Marjorie, claiming that he is not yet fit to be discharged in a bid to spend more time in her company. He also becomes exceedingly jealous of the attention that Marjorie gives to his fellow patient, until he realises that this patient is a young boy and not a rival.

Before his is discharged Danbury proposes to Marjorie, but although she clearly returns his affections, she decides to test him first. She poses as the poor daughter of her old nurse Biddy O'Mulligan, who now runs a fish emporium. Even the sight of Marjorie frying fish in shabby clothes does not dissuade Danbury, although his parents attempt to buy off Marjorie, but when she tells him the truth about her parentage and status, her dishonesty causes him to end the engagement.

Shortly after this, Danbury is shot at a political rally and returns to hospital. When Marjorie reads of this, she rushes to his side to nurse him, rejecting Lord Fitztrevor in the process, and Danbury forgives her for her previous deception. This time it is Marjorie's mother who objects to her daughter's union with a Labour politician, but with a little persuasion from her father all doubts are overcome, and Marjorie and Danbury are free to wed.

The April 24th, 1920 edition of Motion Picture News lists a musical cue sheet for the film.

== Cast ==
- Mary Miles Minter as Marjorie Killonan
- Clyde Fillmore as John Danbury
- George Periolat as Andrew Danbury
- Mollie McConnell as Mrs. Danbury
- Frank Leigh as Lord Douglas Fitztrevor
- Vera Lewis as Duchess of Donegal
- Arthur Hoyt as Anthony, Duke of Donegal
- Frankie Lee as Dick Allen
- Lydia Yeamans Titus as Biddy O'Mulligan
