= The Little Clown =

1921 film

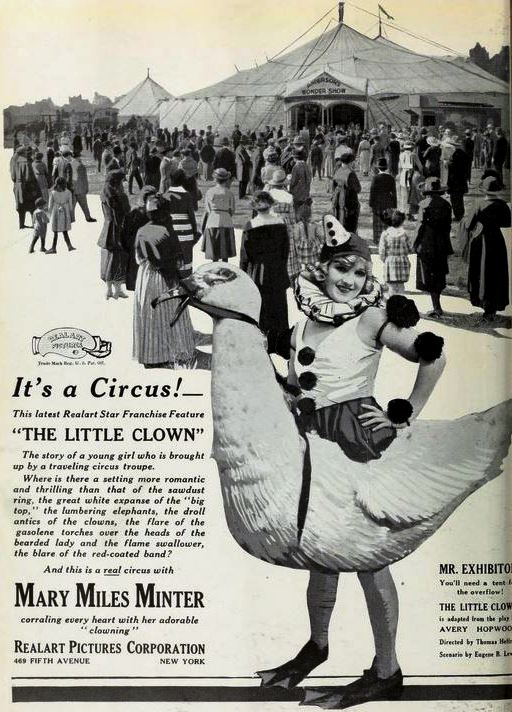
- Advertisement
- Directed by: Thomas N. Heffron
- Screenplay by: Eugene B. Lewis
- Based on: The Little Clown by Avery Hopwood
- Starring: Mary Miles Minter; Jack Mulhall; Neely Edwards
- Cinematography: Faxon M. Dean
- Production company: Realart Pictures Corporation
- Distributed by: Realart Pictures Corporation
- Release date: March 1921
- Running time: 5 reels
- Country: United States
- Language: Silent (English intertitles)

The Little Clown is a 1921 American silent comedy film directed by Thomas N. Heffron and starring Mary Miles Minter, adapted by Eugene B. Lewis from a comedy play by Avery Hopwood. It is one of approximately a dozen of Minter's films which still survive today. A copy of the film was found in the Dawson Film Find in 1978 - although other copies survived in various holdings - and a few brief frames from this copy can be seen in 2016 documentary Dawson City: Frozen Time.

== Plot ==
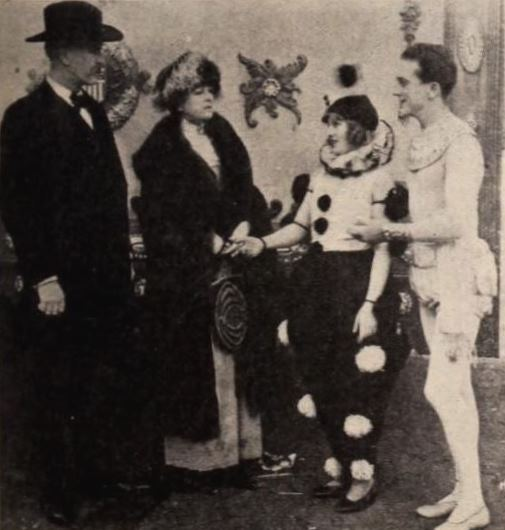
Mary Miles Minter in "The Little Clown" (1921)

As described in various film magazine reviews, Pat has been born and brought up in a travelling circus. Her parents died when she was young, and Toto the clown, who acted as her adoptive father when she was younger, now hopes to marry her as she has come of age.

When the circus stops in a Southern town, Dick Beverly, a young man from an aristocratic family, falls in love with Pat. Having recently argued with his father, he runs away to join the circus with her as a rider. His parents see him performing in the circus and insist that he returns home with them, which he refuses to do until Pat is allowed to join him.

Dick's snobbish parents do not regard Pat as a suitable match for their son, but they agree to his request, hoping that Pat will struggle to adapt to an upper-class lifestyle and that Dick will thus realise that she will not make a good wife. Pat tries her best to rise to the demands of the strict social rules imposed by her prospective parents-in-law, but their lack of approval is clear.

One day when Dick's parents are out of the house, Pat's circus "family" calls to visit her. Dick's younger brother Roddy adds liquor to their drinks, and when Dick's parents return they are appalled by the drunken behaviour and throw the circus folk out of the house. Indignant at the way that the Beverleys have treated her friends, Pat goes with them.

Pat is at the point of accepting Toto's proposal when Roddy confesses to his prank on the circus folk. Dick chases after Pat to confess his love and beg her forgiveness, and Toto gives up his claim on her, leaving Pat and Dick free to wed.

The April 9th, 1921 edition of Motion Picture News lists a musical cue sheet for the film.

== Cast ==
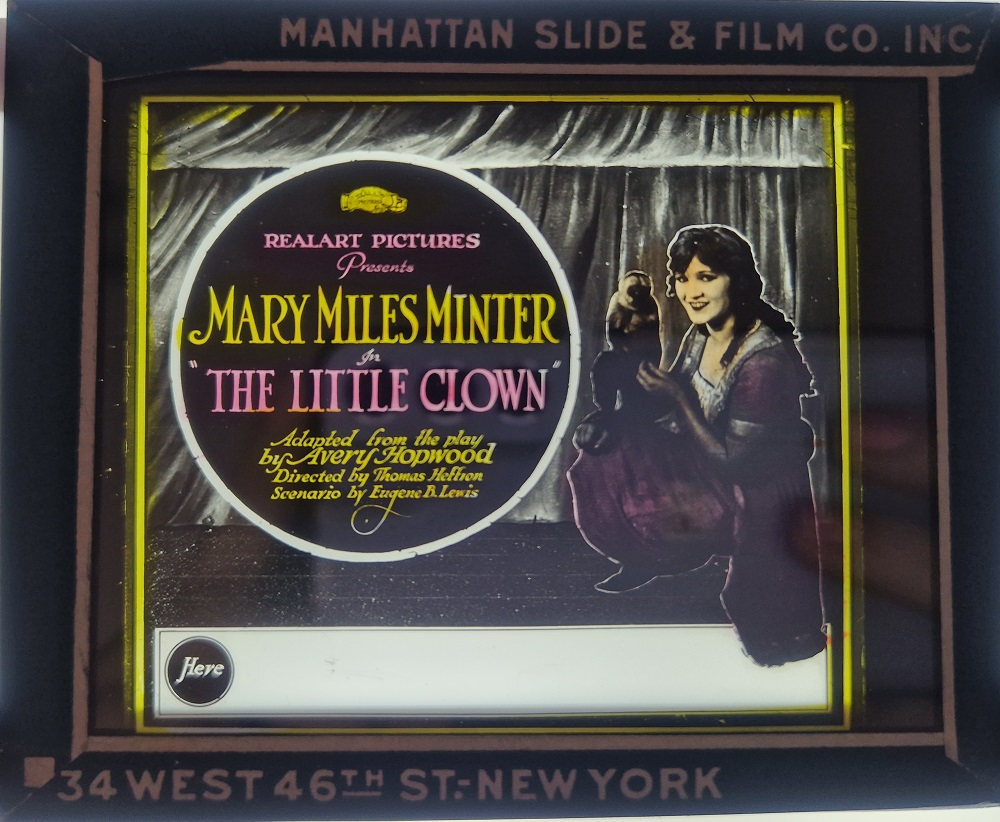
Lantern Slide for "The Little Clown"

- Mary Miles Minter as Pat
- Jack Mulhall as Dick Beverley
- Winter Hall as Colonel Beverley
- Helen Dunbar as Mrs. Beverley
- Cameron Coffey as Roddy Beverley
- Neely Edwards as Toto
- Wilton Taylor as Jim Anderson
- Lucien Littlefield as Connie Potts
- Zelma Maja as Liz
- Laura Anson as Nellie Johnson
