= Dyreda Art Film Corporation =

American silent film production company

Dyreda Art Film Corporation, also known as Dyreda Films, was a silent film production company in the U.S. Its productions included films about World War I. It was bought out by B. A. Rolfe in 1915.

Dyreda was formed by Frank L. Dyer, J. Parker Read, Jr., and J. Searle Dawley. Dawley wrote and directed the studio's first two films. He worked at Famous Players before Dyreda.

The Reliance Company studios in Yonkers, New York were used for filming and Irvin Willat headed the camera department. Robert Nicholls was in charge of stage carpentry. Robert Broderick (actor) had leading roles in a couple of the company's films.

== Filmography ==
- One of Millions (1914)
- In the Name of the Prince of Peace
- Four Feathers (1915)
- Always in the Way (1915)
- The Daughter of the People (1915)
