= A Bit of Jade =

1918 film by Edward Sloman

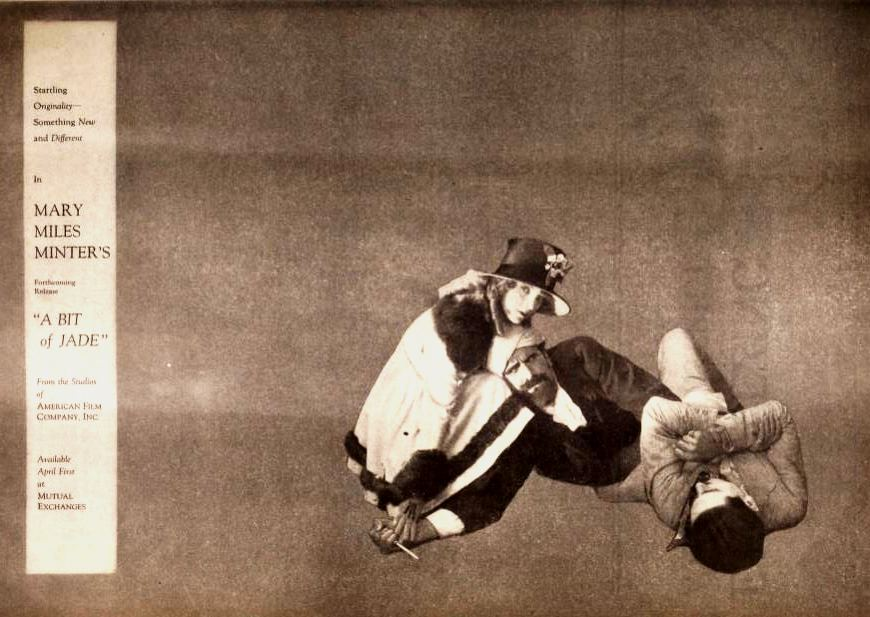
- Advertisement from Exhibitors Herald April 6, 1918
- Directed by: Edward Sloman
- Written by: Karl Coolidge (scenario), Mildred Carl Graham (story)
- Starring: Mary Miles Minter
- Production company: American Film Company
- Distributed by: Mutual Film
- Release date: April 1, 1918 (United States)
- Running time: 5 reels
- Country: United States
- Language: Silent (English intertitles)

A Bit of Jade is a 1918 silent comedy-drama film directed by Edward Sloman and starring Mary Miles Minter. As with many of Minter’s features, it is thought to be a lost film.

== Plot ==
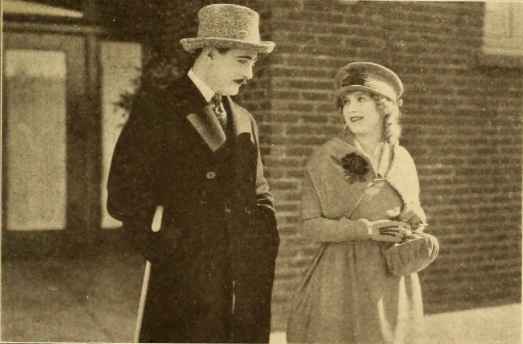
Mary Miles Minter and Allan Forrest in "A Bit of Jade" (1918)

As described in various film magazine reviews, Phyllis King is at lunch in a café one day when her brother Cuthbert comes in, and begs her to lend him her money and jewellery to pay a gambling debt. He promises that he will make it up to her with a gift, and as he leaves he accidentally takes an overcoat belonging to Grayson Blair, which contains a valuable jade necklace in the pocket. When Phyllis is unable to pay for her lunch as Cuthbert has taken all her money, Blair comes to her rescue.

Sometime later, at her aunt's country house, Phyllis and her friends are dressing up in boys' clothes for a lark. Phyllis finds the jade necklace in her brother's coat and, believing it to be the gift her promised her, she puts it on. She then sneaks into a neighbour's boathouse with the intention of borrowing their motorboat, but is caught by Blair. In the ensuing struggle Phyllis escapes but loses both her hat - causing Blair to recognise her as the girl from the café - and the necklace, which Blair retrieves.

Phyllis is approached by Rhi, Blair's discharged Hindu manservant, who is trying to reclaim the jade necklace and return it to the temple whence it came. He offers to help Phyllis retrieve the necklace. When Phyllis gets home, she sees a newspaper article with a picture of the necklace, declaring that it has been stolen. Thinking that her brother has stolen it to pay his gambling debts, Phyllis decides that she needs to return it to its rightful owner before her brother can be accused of theft.

With the help of Rhi, Phyllis sneaks into Blair's house and tries to take the necklace, but he catches her. However, before he can have her arrested, Rhi enters and attacks Blair. Phyllis and Blair together manage to overpower him, and when Cuthbert enters looking for his sister, Blair recognises his overcoat on Cuthbert, and understands how the necklace had, quite innocently, come to be in Phyllis' possession. The film ends with the promise of romance as Blair places the bit of jade around Phyllis' neck.

The June 1918 issue of Photoplay features a detailed fiction adaptation of the film, complete with several stills from the picture.

== Cast ==
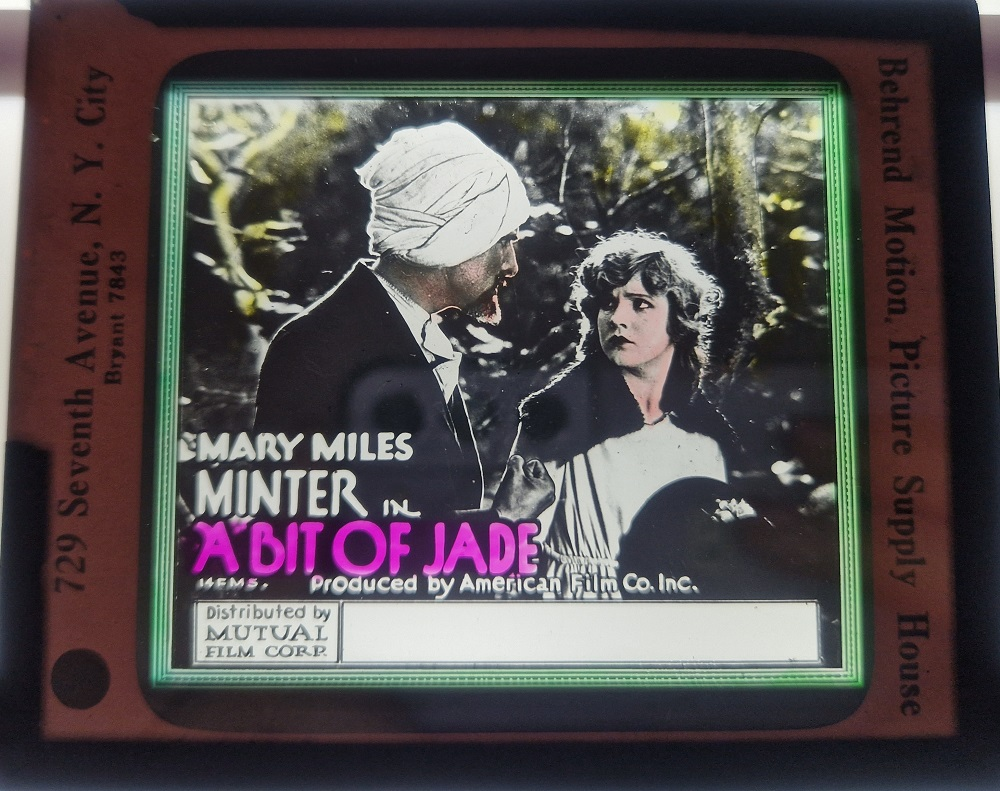
Lantern slide for "A Bit of Jade"

- Mary Miles Minter as Phyllis King
- Allan Forrest as Grayson Blair
- David Howard as Cuthbert King
- Vera Lewis as Mrs. Abigail King
- Al Ferguson as Rhi
- Clarence Burton as Lantz
