= Faith (1916 film) =

1916 silent film directed by James Kirkwood

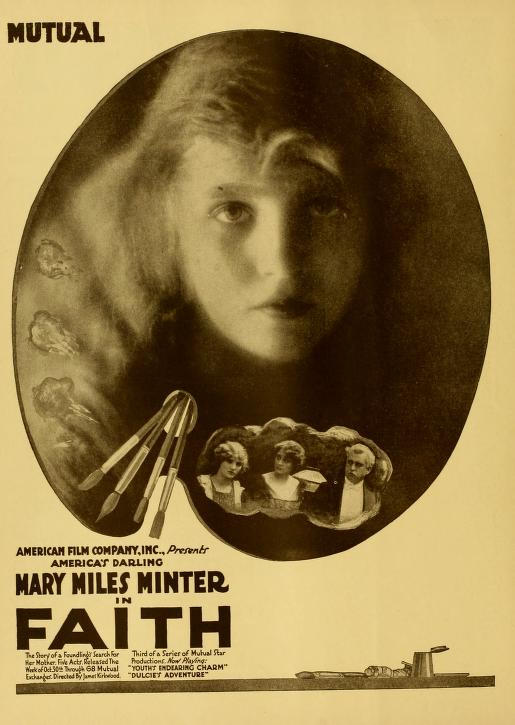
- Directed by: James Kirkwood
- Written by: James Kirkwood
- Starring: Mary Miles Minter
- Cinematography: Carl Widen
- Distributed by: Mutual Film
- Release date: October 30, 1916 (United States)
- Running time: 6 reels
- Country: United States
- Languages: Silent; English intertitles

Faith (also known as The Virtuous Outcast) is a 1916 American silent drama film directed by James Kirkwood and starring Mary Miles Minter. It was the first of Minter's films to also feature her older sister Margaret Shelby. The film survives and is preserved at the George Eastman Museum, Rochester.

== Plot ==
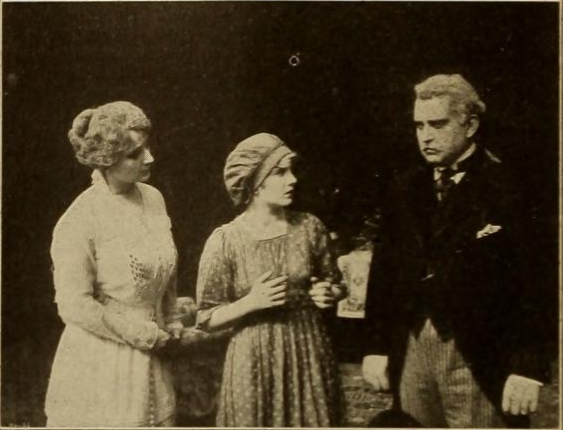
Mary Miles Minter in "Faith" (1916)

As described in Motography magazine:

Helen Thorpe is secretly married to a man her father disapproves of. Her husband is killed and when approaching motherhood forces Helen to confess her secret marriage her father is furiously angry. When the baby is born, Thorpe places it in an orphan asylum, telling Helen that it died. Only the housekeeper and Thorpe know the truth.

Some fifteen years later, Thorpe has married again and is treating his step-daughter, seventeen-year-old Laura, in the same rigorous way he had trained Helen, and she too is enmeshed in a secret love affair. Helen, a saddened woman, is unable to influence her father. And Faith, Helen's daughter, is in an orphan asylum.

Only the old housekeeper has kept track of Faith, and she seizes an opportunity to bring the girl into the Thorpe home as a servant. Faith, whose life is kept bright by the belief that "God's in His Heaven. All's right with the world," has always dreamed of miraculously discovering that she has a mother. This belief makes her unusually solicitous for the mothers of others. So when Laura, the daughter of the house, having come to grief through her clandestine love affair, steals money from Thorpe's safe, Faith assumes the guilt in order to save, not Laura, but Laura's mother.

Faith, however, had been kind not only to mothers, but had played "Little Sunshine" to the neighbourhood in general, and had won as a friend Mark Strong, once a brilliant lawyer, now a derelict. When Strong learns of the affair, he uses his dormant power to free the girl, and of course his investigations disclose the fact of Faith's parentage and of Thorpe's roguery. Faith finds her mother, and all those who deserve happiness are given it.

== Cast ==
- Mary Miles Minter as Faith
- Perry Banks as Mark Strong
- Clarence Burton as John Thorpe
- Lizette Thorne as Helen
- Margaret Shelby as Laura
- Josephine Taylor as Mrs. Thorpe
- Gertrude Le Brandt as Mrs. Stimson

== Reception ==
The New York Times noticed that producers of the film were attempting to make leading actress Minter famous with this picture, but gave all credit to Banks, stating he "walked away with this film".
