= Always in the Way =

1915 film by J. Searle Dawley

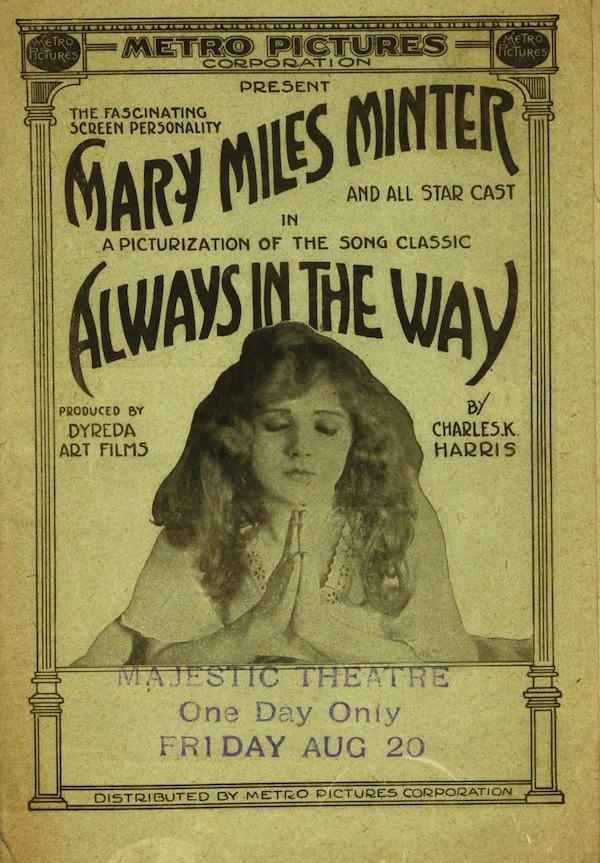
- Theatrical Poster
- Directed by: J. Searle Dawley
- Written by: Charles K. Harris
- Produced by: Louis B. Mayer
- Starring: Mary Miles Minter
- Cinematography: Irvin Willat
- Production company: Dyreda Art Film Corp.
- Distributed by: Metro Pictures
- Release date: June 21, 1915
- Running time: 6 reels
- Country: United States
- Language: Silent (English intertitles)

Always in the Way is a 1915 American silent drama film directed by J. Searle Dawley and starring Mary Miles Minter. The film, which was inspired by the song of the same name by Charles K. Harris, was partially filmed in the Bahamas. As with many of Minter's features, the film is thought to be a lost film.

== Plot ==
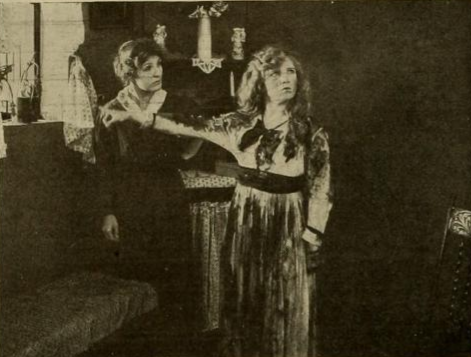
Mary Miles Minter in "Always in the Way" (1915)

As described in film magazines, Winfred North, a widower, marries a widow with two children, believing this will be best for his five-year-old daughter, Dorothy. When her step-mother discovers that Dorothy is to inherit the entirety of her father's fortune, she passes her off as an orphan, and has her adopted by a missionary couple who take the little girl to Africa.

Now aged fifteen, Dorothy is aiding her adoptive father Revered Goodwin in his missionary work, when she meets Robert Armstrong, a prospector, and they become sweethearts. However, the natives take up arms and kill Dorothy's adoptive parents. Dorothy is rescued and taken to New York, where she begins to work in a florist's shop. Armstrong also returns to New York and searches relentlessly for Dorothy. By a series of coincidences he becomes acquainted first with Winfred North, and then with a former friend of Dorothy's step-mother, who reveals what the step-mother has done.

In the meantime, Dorothy tells her story to a journalist with whom she shares her boarding house. When Armstrong reads the subsequent article, he is finally able to find his lost sweetheart. He re-unites Dorothy with her father, who promptly denounces the step-mother, and the young couple are engaged.

The July 10th, 1915 edition of Motion Picture News lists a musical cue sheet for the film.

== Cast ==
- Mary Miles Minter as Dorothy North
- Ethelmary Oakland as Dorothy North (child)
- Lowell Sherman as Winfred North
- Edna Holland as Mrs. Helen Stillwell
- Mabel Greene as May Stillwell
- Harold Meltzer as Alan Stillwell
- Arthur Evers as Reverend Goodwin
- Charlotte Shelby as Mrs. Goodwin
- Franklin B. Coates as Robert Armstrong
