= Dimples (1916 film) =

1916 film by Edgar Jones

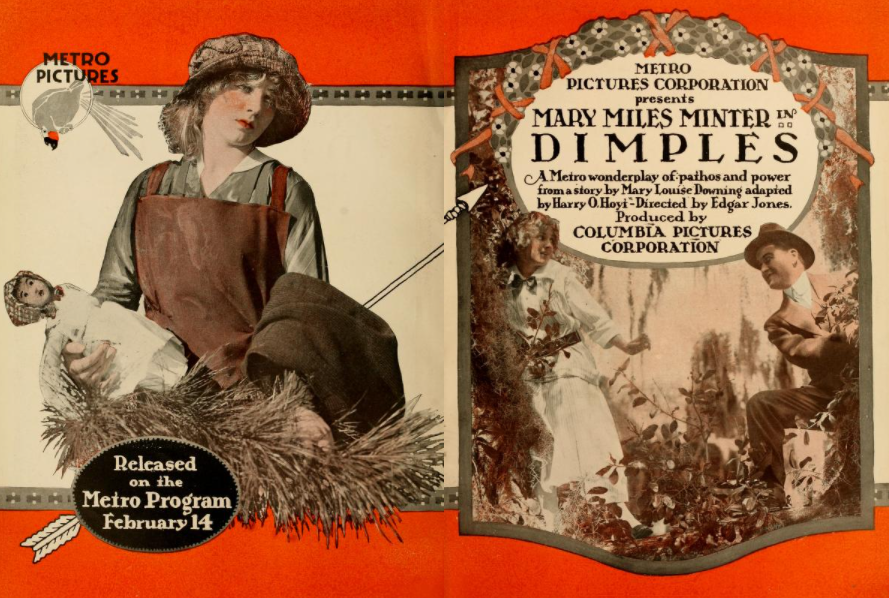
- Advertisement from Moving Picture World (February 1916)
- Directed by: Edgar Jones
- Written by: Harry O. Hoyt
- Produced by: Louis B. Mayer
- Starring: Mary Miles Minter
- Distributed by: Metro Pictures
- Release date: February 13, 1916
- Running time: 5 reels
- Country: United States
- Languages: Silent; English intertitles

Dimples is a 1916 silent drama film directed by Edgar Jones. The film stars Mary Miles Minter in the lead role.

The film is held by Cinémathèque Française, Paris.

== Plot ==
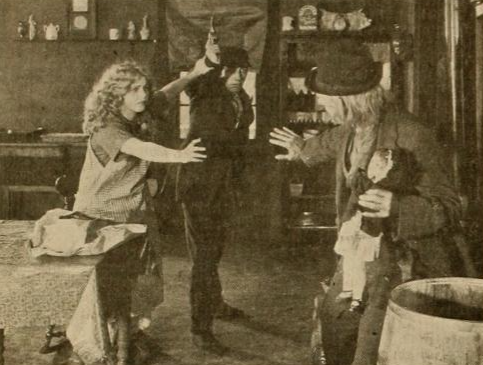
Mary Miles Minter in "Dimples" (1916)

As described in film magazines, "Dimples" is a young girl who lives in a poor tenement with her elderly father, visited only by Horton, her father's simple-minded friend. When Dimples' father dies, Horton discovers the money he has hoarded, which he hides inside a doll, given to Dimples as a gift. Horton then passes away, and Dimples goes to live with her aunt, who runs a boarding house in the South.

A fellow residence of this boarding house is Robert Stanley who has made his money in cotton. Cotton drops and it looks like he may be ruined, but when a crook who had seen Horton hide the money in the doll makes the journey to Florida to try to steal Dimples' fortune, all is revealed. Dimples uses the money to save Robert from ruin, and they put their money together in the bank under one name.

== Cast ==
- Mary Miles Minter as Dimples
- William Cowper as Her Father
- John J. Donough as Horton
- Thomas Carrigan as Robert Stanley
- Schuyler Ladd as Joseph Langdon
- Peggy Hopkins Joyce as Eugenia Abbott
- Charlotte Shelby as Mrs. Riley
