= Melissa of the Hills =

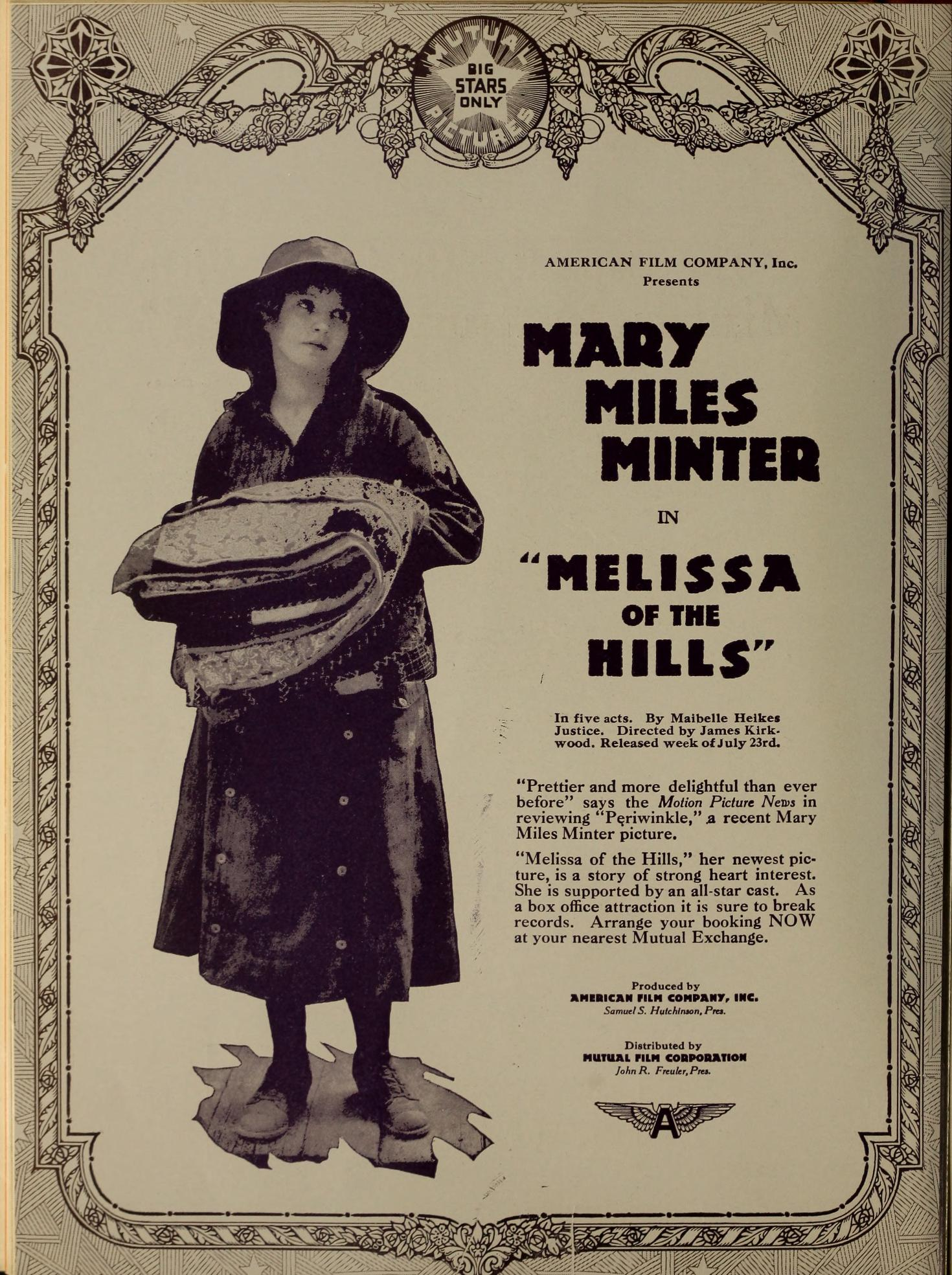
- Directed by: James Kirkwood
- Written by: Maibelle Heikes Justice
- Starring: Mary Miles Minter
- Distributed by: Mutual Film
- Release date: July 23, 1917
- Running time: 5 reels
- Country: United States
- Language: Silent (English intertitles)

Melissa of the Hills is a 1917 American silent film directed by James Kirkwood and starring Mary Miles Minter. As is the case with many of Minter's features, it is thought to be a lost film.

== Plot ==
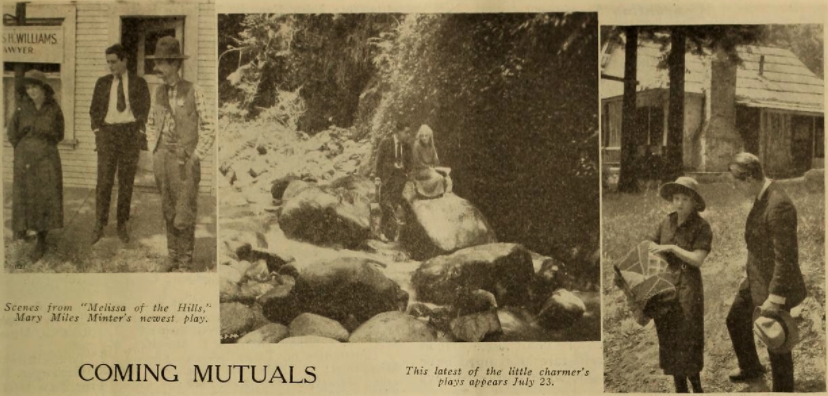
Three scenes from "Melissa of the Hills" (1917)

As described in film magazines, young Melissa Stark lives with her father Jethro, a circuit rider and preacher, in the Tennessee mountains. Melissa tries to aid her father in his ministry, but the warring clans of the mountains, the Watts and the Allisons, do not appreciate their endeavours. Melissa's friend and confidant is Tom Williams, a young attorney practising nearby.

Trouble erupts between the clans when Sam Allison, deputy sheriff, kills a member of the Watts clan, and the Watts vow revenge. The Allisons, meanwhile, become convinced that Jethro Stark has taken the side of the Watts after he tends to their children during an epidemic. Matters are complicated when a city couple arrive, having donated a new dress to Melissa after she replied to a newspaper offer, and mistakenly identify Jethro as a fugitive from justice, despite the real criminal having confessed.

Sam Allison, still bearing a grudge against Jethro for his perceived favouring of the Watts clan, is only too happy to arrest him. Desperate to protect her father, Melissa begs the help of the Watts clan. A battle ensues, and it is only when Jethro Stark is killed by a stray bullet that both clans realise the error of their ways and reconcile. Melissa, left alone after the death of her father, marries Tom the attorney.

== Cast ==
- Mary Miles Minter - Melissa Stark
- Spottiswoode Aitken - Jethro Stark
- Allan Forrest - Tom Williams
- George Periolat - Cyrus Kimball
- Perry Banks - Dr. Brand
- Gertrude Le Brandt - Mrs. Sanders
- Harvey Clark (actor) - Cutler Sanders
- Frank Thompson - Sam Allison
- John Gough - Larry Watts
- Emma Kluge - Mrs. Watts
- Anne Schaefer - Sally Smith
