= The Gentle Intruder =

1917 American silent film

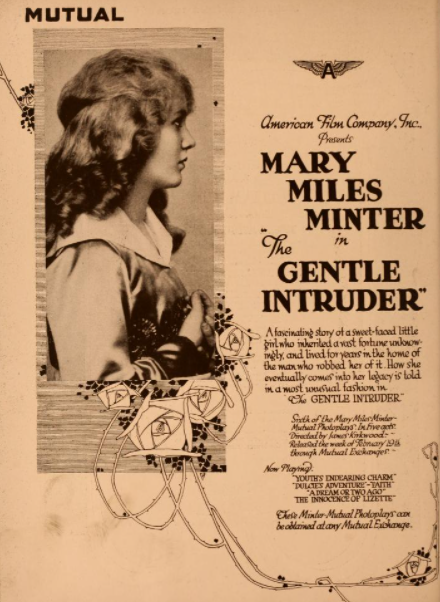
- Directed by: James Kirkwood
- Written by: Clifford Howard
- Starring: Mary Miles Minter
- Distributed by: Mutual Film
- Release date: February 19, 1917
- Running time: 5 reels
- Country: United States
- Languages: Silent; English intertitles

The Gentle Intruder is a 1917 American silent drama film directed by James Kirkwood and starring Mary Miles Minter. The film was Minter's sixth production with Mutual Film. It is one of approximately a dozen of Minter's films known to have survived; a copy is held by the Dutch Filmmuseum.

== Plot ==
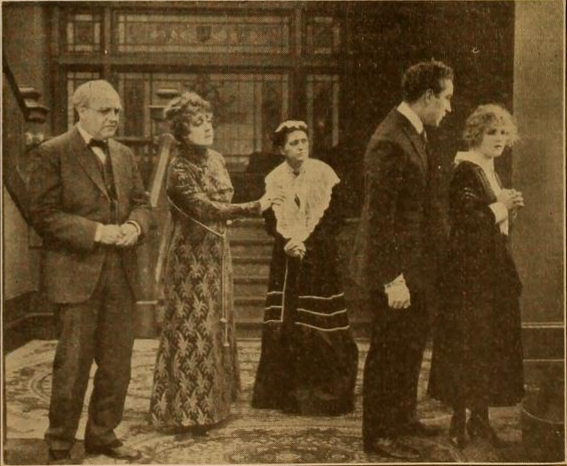
Scene from "The Gentle Intruder" (1917)

As described in film magazines, Sylvia is the niece of a wealthy man who, unbeknownst to her, wills her his entire fortune. Her uncle's attorney, Baxter, appropriates the money to fund his family's lavish social life, and employs Sylvia in his house as a servant, whose role is to act as a companion to his sister.

The Baxter family's ill-gotten fortune has a negative effect upon their son Arnold, who turns to gambling and to drink. While trying to hide the worst of his excesses from his father, Sylvia comes to realise that she loves Arnold. Arnold, in turn, discovers that his family's wealth is truthfully Sylvia's, and confronts his father about this.

The family are horrified at the thought of losing their lavish lifestyle, and Baxter begs Sylvia for forgiveness. Sylvia is content without the fortune, having found something far preferable to her than the money, and she and Arnold are married.

== Cast ==
- Mary Miles Minter as Sylvia
- George Fisher as Arnold Baxter
- Eugenie Forde as Mrs. Baxter
- Harvey Clark as Mr. Baxter
- Franklin Ritchie as The Count
- George Periolat as Sylvia's uncle

== Production ==
The December 20, 1916 issue of Reel Life had a news item describing an element of the film's production: "George Periolat, who plays an important role in the first scenes of The Gentle Intruder, the new Mary Miles Minter feature being directed by James Kirkwood, is having an easy time this week at the Santa Barbara studio of the American company. All he has to do is to lie in bed all day while the camera records his failing health and death. After three or four days of it, however, Periolat says he doesn't wish to see a bed for a week."

In the February 3, 1917 issue, Reel Life also observed that The Gentle Intruder was Minter's first film "with her hair done up."

== Reception ==
The Moving Picture World said on February 24, 1917, that the film "will be a fit companion piece to the preceding pictures in which the young American star [Minter] has appeared, and affords her a wide opportunity in a difficult role."

Motion Picture News said on March 3, 1917, that the film "is a typical Mary Miles Minter-Cinderella production. By this we mean that the diminutive star has the same tribulations that she has encountered so many times in the celluloid... These plot high-lights have been incorporated into nearly every picture starring Miss Minter. They will probably continue to form the foundation of Minter releases, because these circumstances are ideal for displaying the star's youth, wistfulness, and engaging mannerisms. The public would probably resent seeing Miss Minter in a different kind of role, just as it wants Maude Adams to play nothing but Peter Pan."

Proving the Motion Picture News critic correct, the Dayton, Ohio Journal review objected to Minter's hairstyle: "Give us back our Mary. In The Gentle Intruder, Mary is no longer the laughing care-free child. She has her hair done up. Lord! fancy Mary Miles with done up hair. We refuse to stand for it. Of course Mary is gentle and wistful and awfully nice, but we want her with her hair down."
