= Anne of Green Gables (1919 film) =

1919 film by William Desmond Taylor

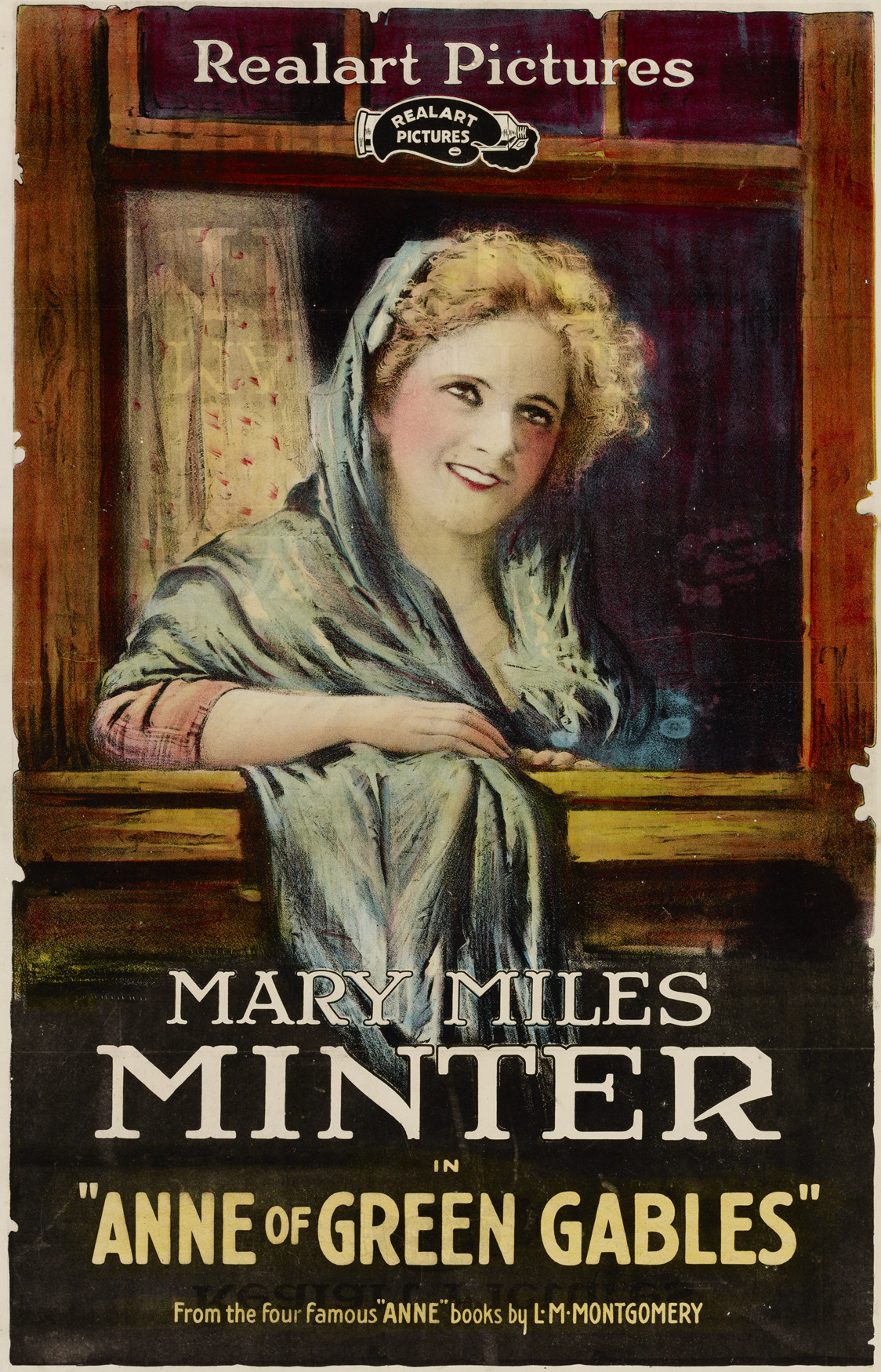
- Theatrical release poster
- Directed by: William Desmond Taylor
- Written by: Frances Marion (scenario)
- Based on: Anne of Green Gables; 1908 novel by Lucy Maud Montgomery
- Starring: Mary Miles Minter
- Cinematography: Hal Young
- Production company: Realart Pictures Corporation
- Distributed by: Realart Pictures Corporation
- Release date: November 23, 1919 (United States)
- Running time: 60 minutes
- Country: United States
- Language: Silent (English intertitles)

Anne of Green Gables is a 1919 American silent comedy-drama film directed by William Desmond Taylor. The film was based upon the 1908 novel of the same name by Lucy Maud Montgomery. By 1999, all prints of the film were believed to have been lost.

== Plot ==
As described in a film magazine, Anne Shirley, whose time as an orphan has been a lively one due to her natural mischievousness, is sent by mistake to the home of Marilla Cuthbert and her brother Matthew. The brother and sister had sought to adopt a boy to help around their farm, but decide to keep Anne anyway. Her early youth is a series of misfortunes or "scrapes." During this time she meets Gilbert Blythe and their love for each other begins. When Anne has graduated from high school and is happily looking forward to college, Matthew dies and Marilla is struck blind. Anne takes a position in the village as a school teacher. Gilbert has taken up medicine during this time. Despite the ill luck that continues to follow her, Anne manages to save enough and pays for an operation that restores Marilla's vision. Then she and Gilbert are married.

Lucy Maud Montgomery hated the film because of what she called "absurdities." According to Montgomery, the flag of the United States was prominently displayed at Anne's graduation from her Canadian college. In another part, Anne encountered a skunk and mistook it for a kitten. However, skunks did not exist on Prince Edward Island at the time the film took place or came out, and only happened to be introduced by a farmer later. The film also contained a scene where Anne punished a child. Afterward, Anne brandished a shotgun to fend off an angry mob that congregated at her schoolhouse door on the child's behalf.

A summary of the film was published in the April 1920 issue of Moving Picture Aid, including four stills which have survived.

== Cast ==
- Mary Miles Minter as Anne
- Paul Kelly as Gilbert Blythe
- Marcia Harris as Marilla Cuthbert
- Frederick Burton as Matthew Cuthbert
- Carolyn Lee as Mrs. Barry

== Production notes ==
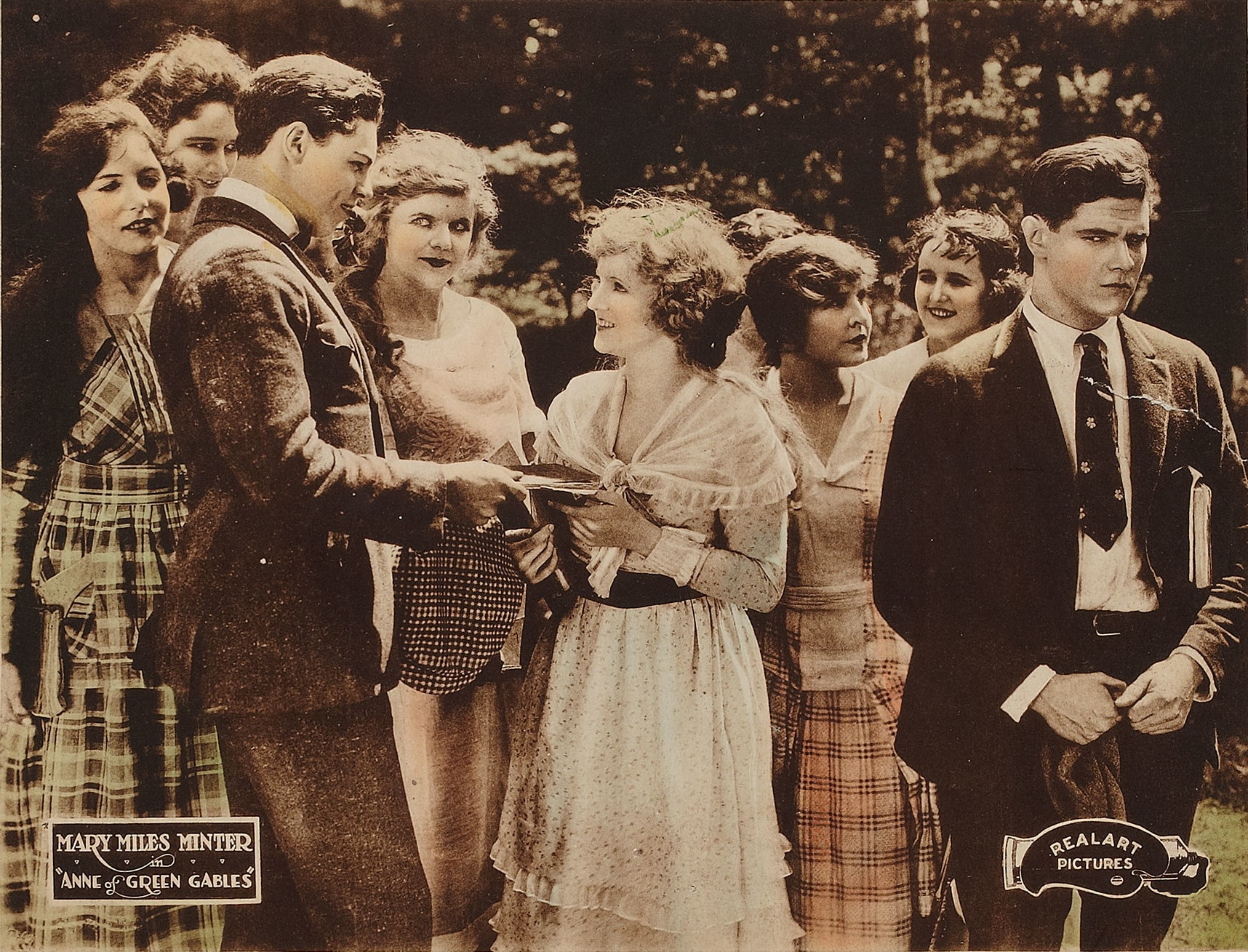
Lobby card depicting a film scene.

The film was shot in Dedham, Massachusetts, from August to October 1919 and released on November 23, 1919.

Lucy Maud Montgomery, who wrote the original novel, was infuriated with the many liberties the film took with her characters, including changing Anne from a Canadian to an American. She wrote in her diary:

"It was a pretty little play well photographed, but I think if I hadn't already known it was from my book, that I would never have recognized it. The landscape and folks were 'New England', never P.E. Island... A skunk and an American flag were introduced – both equally unknown in PE Island. I could have shrieked with rage over the latter. Such crass, blatant Yankeeism!"

After the controversy between Mary Miles Minter and William Desmond Taylor, the studio destroyed all the copies from the movie.

=== Filming ===
After the studio purchased the rights to the book, they sent a scout to New England to find a filming location. He declared Dedham, Massachusetts, to be the "quaint New England village" they were looking for, but choosing the Fairbanks House as the title home was an odd choice as it did not resemble the Nova Scotian farmhouse that served as the inspiration. (Note: The author of the book, L.M. Montgomery, was displeased with the film as a whole as she thought it was too "New England" and not enough "Prince Edward Island.")

It was the favorite role of star Mary Miles Minter, who starred as Anne Shirley. It was while in Dedham that Minter fell in love with Taylor, who was 30 years older than she was. Taylor and the film crew arrived in Dedham in July and filmed at First Church and Parish in Dedham, St. Paul's Church, the Endicott School, the lawn of the Endicott Estate, the Charles River, the Captain Onion House, and the Dedham Woods. They also filmed in Islington.

In addition to local landmarks, there were 75 locals who were cast as extras, and James Burke's Jersey cow and Arthur Benson's "prize porkers" were also shown. The film also starred Paul Kelly.

A picnic was held at the Fairbanks House for the film crew after production finally ended in August, having been delayed by an unusually rainy summer. Minter spoke at the Fairbanks family reunion where she was presented with a bouquet of American beauty roses. It was released on November 23, 1919. On December 1, the film was shown for the first time in Memorial Hall. There was a second showing later in the week and two more the following week.
