= Annie-for-Spite =

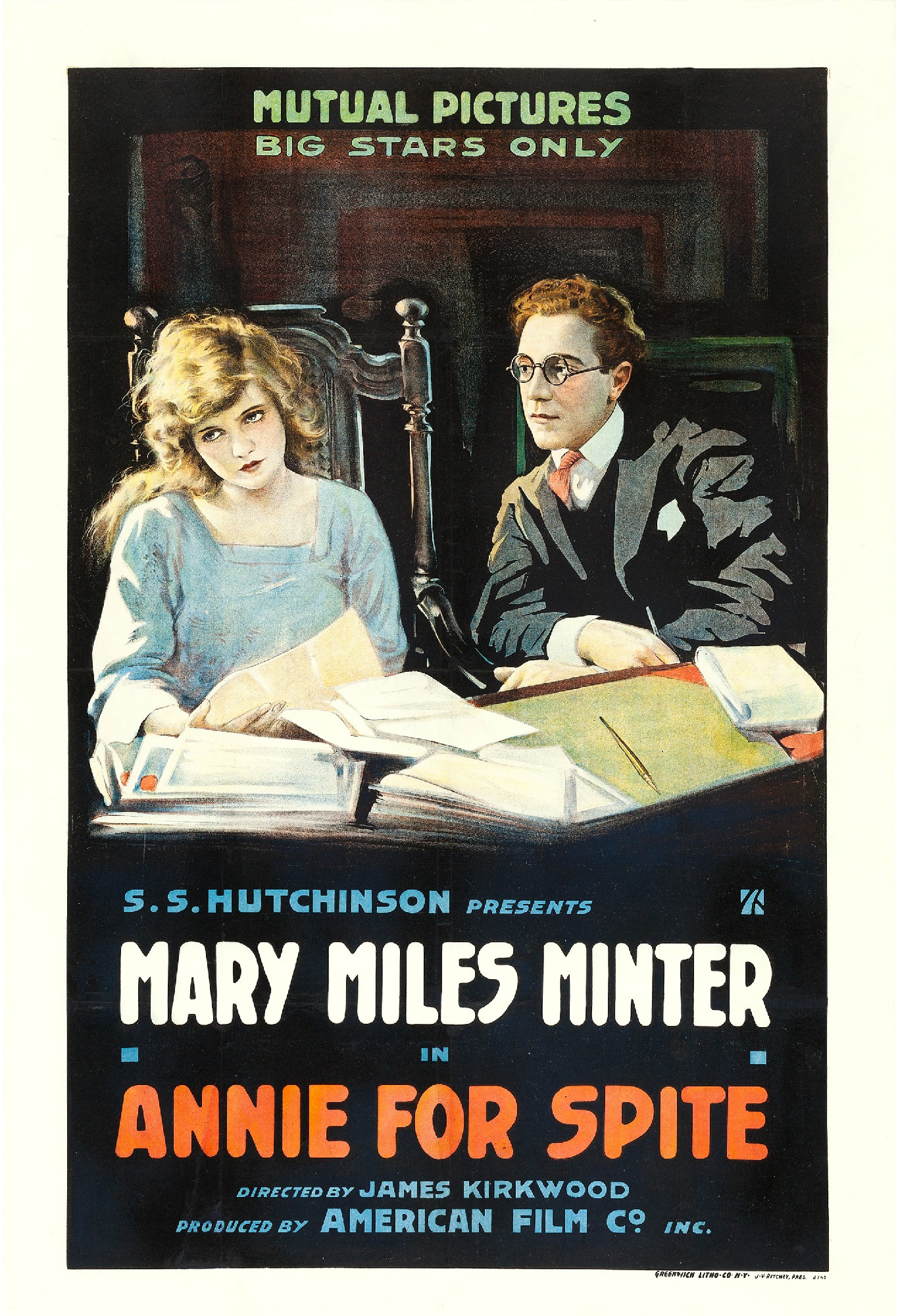
- Theatrical poster
- Directed by: James Kirkwood
- Written by: Frederick J. Jackson (story); Julian La Mothe
- Starring: Mary Miles Minter
- Distributed by: Mutual Film
- Release date: May 14, 1917
- Running time: 5 reels
- Country: United States
- Languages: Silent; English intertitles

Annie-for-Spite is a 1917 American silent film directed by James Kirkwood and starring Mary Miles Minter. The film is based upon the 1916 short story Annie for Spite by Frederick J. Jackson. As with many of Minter's features, it is thought to be a lost film.

== Plot ==
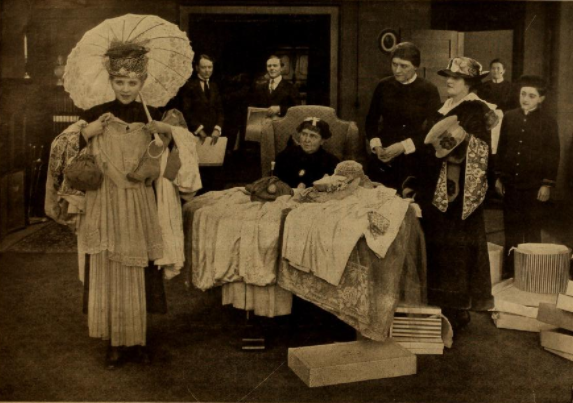
Mary Miles Minter in "Annie-For-Spite" (1917)

As described in film magazines, Annie Johnson is a homely orphan girl, who works in a department store and helps a widow take care of her six children in exchange for a place to stay. Despite her poverty, she dreams that she will one day be adopted by a rich old lady who will provide her with whatever she might want.

Meanwhile Mrs. Nottingham, a wealthy widow, is looking for an heir. Her only son has died, and she does not wish to leave her fortune to her daughter-in-law, whom she dislikes, and to her grandson whom she has never met. To spite her daughter-in-law, she instructs her lawyer to find the plainest little girl in the city to adopt and become her heir. The lawyer finds Annie, freshly dismissed from the department store, and she is promptly presented to Mrs. Nottingham and adopted.

In the comforts of a rich home, and dressed in expensive clothes, Annie quickly transforms into a beauty. She also transforms the home and the attitude of Mrs. Nottingham with her positive outlook, and the old woman grows genuinely fond of her before she passes away, leaving her home and her entire fortune to Annie.

Emily, Mrs. Nottingham's daughter-in-law, is furious when she discovers this and seeks to break the will. Her son Willard is installed as Annie's secretary under a false name. He falls in love with Annie, and although the court case over the will is settled in Emily's favour, Willard and Annie are nonetheless happily married.

== Cast ==
- Mary Miles Minter - Annie Johnson
- George Fisher - Willard Kaine Nottingham
- Eugenie Forde - Mrs. Emily Nottingham
- Gertrude Le Brandt - Mrs. J.G. Nottingham
- George Periolat - Andrew Walters
