= Charity Castle =

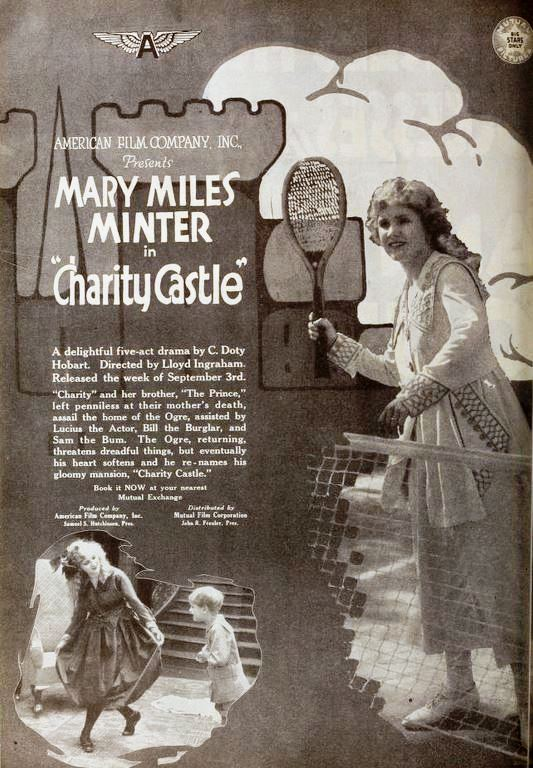
- Advertisement for film
- Directed by: Lloyd Ingraham
- Written by: Doty Hobart
- Starring: Mary Miles Minter
- Production company: American Film Company
- Distributed by: Mutual Film
- Release date: September 3, 1917
- Running time: 5 reels
- Country: United States
- Language: Silent (English intertitles)

Charity Castle is a 1917 American silent comedy-drama film directed by Lloyd Ingraham and starring Mary Miles Minter. As is the case with many of Minter's features, it is thought to be a lost film.

== Plot ==
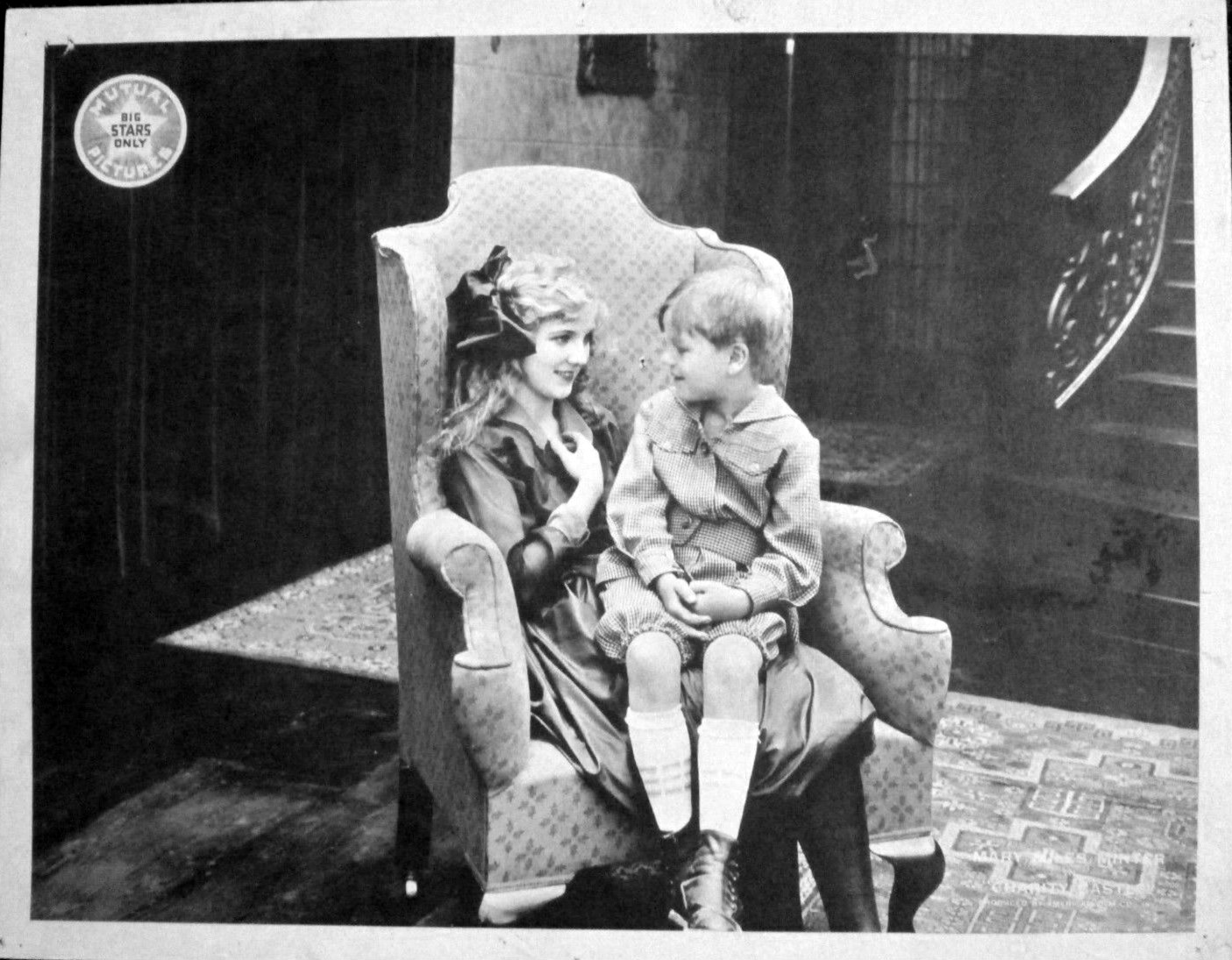
Charity Castle lobby card

As described and illustrated in various film magazines, when the mother of Charity and her little brother, whom she calls "The Prince," passes away, they are left in the care of her tenant, Merlin Durand. He is the son of a millionaire, but his miserly father, who disapproves of his extravagant lifestyle, has banished him from home until he can produce his first week's pay-check.

When Merlin's bills pile up, Charity takes pity on him, and decides that she and her brother will talk his father into taking him back. They go to the father's house and find it deserted; Simon Durand has gone to "take the waters" and the servants have seized the opportunity to take the night off. Charity and the Prince promptly move into the house and call it their castle, as they wait for the father's return.

That night, Bill the burglar breaks into the house, but Charity charms him into becoming their protector. To complete this unconventional household, Sam the bum and Lucius, a stranded actor, soon join them. When Simon Durand returns, he is at first furious to find these strangers in his home; Charity, however, soon wins him over, and he decides to keep on Bill, Sam and Lucius in place of his absent servants.

Merlin, meanwhile, has managed to secure a job. With his first pay-check in hand, he goes to see his father, where he is overjoyed to find his wards safe and sound. Father and son are reconciled, and all live happily in the newly-renamed "Charity Castle."

== Cast ==
- Mary Miles Minter as Charity
- Clifford Callis as The Prince
- Allan Forrest as Merlin Durand
- Eugenie Forde as Zelma Verona
- Henry A. Barrows as Simon Durand
- Ashton Dearholt as Elmer Trent
- Robert Klein as Graves
- Spottiswoode Aitken as Lucius Garrett
- George Ahearn as Bill Turner
- J. Gordon Russell as Sam Smith
