= The Fairy and the Waif =

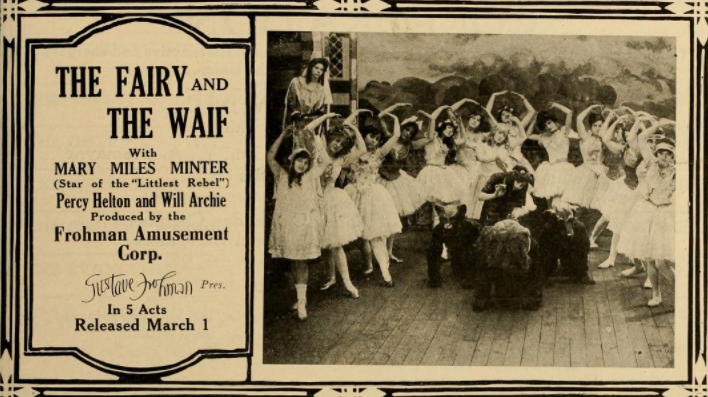
- Advertisement from Moving Picture World
- Directed by: Marie Hubert Frohman; George Irving
- Written by: Marie Hubert Frohman
- Produced by: Gustave Frohman
- Starring: Mary Miles Minter
- Cinematography: Jacques Montéran
- Music by: Sidney Jones
- Distributed by: World Film
- Release date: March 1, 1915
- Running time: 5 reels
- Country: United States
- Languages: Silent; English intertitles

The Fairy and the Waif is a 1915 silent drama film directed by Marie Hubert Frohman and George Irving. This was the first feature-length film of actress Mary Miles Minter, who was twelve years old by the time of the release, although she had previously appeared in the 1912 short The Nurse under the name Juliet Shelby.

== Plot ==
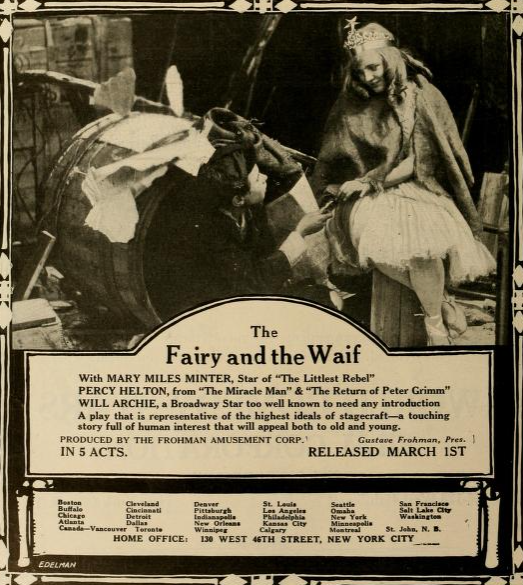
Advertisement in Moving Picture World

As described in film magazines, Viola Drayton, the daughter of Major Drayton, is a young girl who wants to be a real fairy. When her father goes to Europe to participate in World War I, he leaves Viola in the care of his business associate Nevinson and his wife, and provides them with $30,000 to invest on Viola's behalf.

News arrives from Europe that Major Drayton has been killed in battle, and, upon hearing this, Nevinson appropriates Viola's money. This does not save him financially, however, and his wife is obliged to take in boarders. They force Viola to work as a household drudge until one day she runs away. She is taken in by a theatre company, and finds herself playing the role of a fairy.

During one rehearsal, Viola takes fright and runs away from the theatre, still dressed in her fairy costume. She encounters a homeless waif who believes that she is a real fairy, and they shelter in a barrel together until they are found by a policeman.

Meanwhile it transpires that Major Drayton has not been killed; he returns to New York and issues a reward for his lost daughter. The policeman, recognising Viola from the description accompanying the reward, reunites her with her father, and Major Drayton also takes in the waif.

== Cast ==
- Mary Miles Minter as Viola Drayton, the Fairy
- Percy Helton as The Waif
- Will Archie as Sweetie
- William T. Carleton as Major Drayton
- Hubert Wilke as Mr. Nevinson
- Ina Brooks as Mrs. Nevinson
- Frank Gillmore

== Preservation ==
A copy is preserved at Cinémathèque Française, Paris.
