= The Innocence of Lizette =

1916 American silent film by James Kirkwood

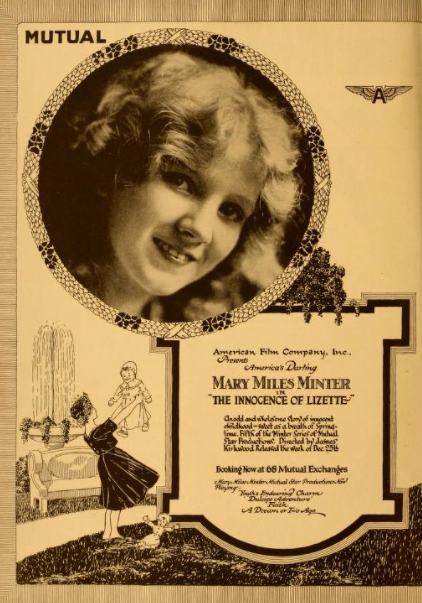
- Directed by: James Kirkwood
- Written by: Arthur Henry Gooden (Scenario)
- Story by: Bessie Boniel
- Starring: Mary Miles Minter
- Distributed by: Mutual Film; Pathe Freres(Europe release)
- Release date: December 25, 1916 (United States)
- Running time: 5 reels
- Country: United States
- Languages: Silent; English intertitles

The Innocence of Lizette is a 1916 American silent comedy-drama film directed by James Kirkwood and starring Mary Miles Minter. It is one of approximately a dozen of Minter's films which are known to have survived. The film was restored in the Netherlands in 2004 and was shown at several European film festivals along with A Dream or Two Ago, another Minter feature from 1916.

== Plot ==
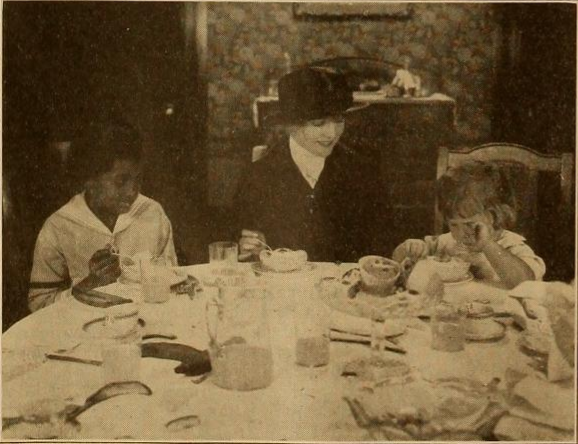
Mary Miles Minter in "The Innocence of Lizette" (1916)

As described in film magazines, Lizette, is a young girl who is left without money or family when her grandfather dies. She is taken in by her grandfather's old landlady, Granny Page, whose nephew Paul runs a news-stand where Lizette sometimes helps out.

While working at the news-stand, Lizette catches the attention of two men; Dan Nye, a handsome but dishonest young man, and Henry Faure, an elderly man still mourning the loss of his wife and daughter. Faure adopts Lizette as she reminds him of his lost daughter, and Lizette goes to live with him in his mansion.

One day Faure is called away on business, and Lizette takes the opportunity to visit Granny Page and Paul for a while. On her return to Faure's mansion, she finds a baby on the doorstep, abandoned by its mother who could not afford to keep it. Being very innocent, Lizette believes that babies are gifts sent from Heaven by God, and thus, when Faure's housekeeper and butler enquire as to where she found the baby, Lizette earnestly insists that it is her own.

When Faure returns, he is shocked, and angrily demands to know the identity of the father. Lizette does not understand the implications of the question, but she supposes that babies must have fathers as well as mothers, and so names the first man that comes into her head: Dan Nye. Faure storms into Nye's office and demands that he marry Lizette. Nye is initially puzzled, but soon seizes the opportunity to demand a significant payment from Faure if he is to wed.

When Faure returns to his mansion with Nye, Lizette refuses to marry him, and runs away with the baby. At the same time, the baby's real mother arrives, seeking her child, along with Paul, who is furious with Nye for what he believes he has done to Lizette. When Lizette is compelled to return by a policeman, all is revealed; Nye is thrown out of the house and mother and baby are reunited.

== Cast ==
- Mary Miles Minter as Lizette
- Eugene Forde as Paul
- Harvey Clark as Henry Faure
- Eugenie Forde as Granny Page
- Ashton Dearholt as Dan Nye
- Blanche Hanson as Mrs. Bunn
