= A Dream or Two Ago =

1916 film by James Kirkwood

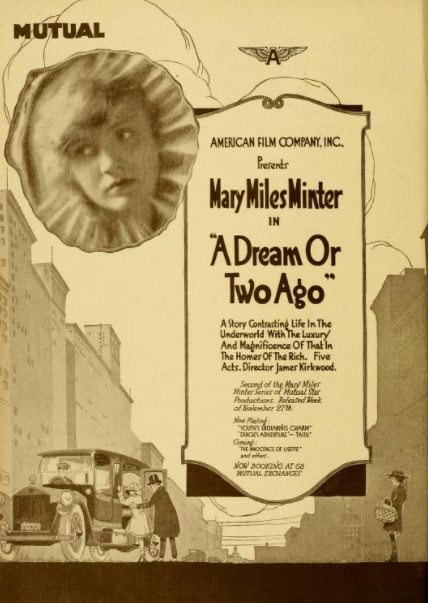
- Directed by: James Kirkwood
- Written by: Arthur Henry Gooden; Henry Albert Phillips (story)
- Starring: Mary Miles Minter
- Cinematography: Carl Widen
- Distributed by: Mutual Film
- Release date: November 27, 1916 (United States)
- Running time: 5 reels
- Country: United States
- Languages: Silent; English intertitles

A Dream or Two Ago is a 1916 American silent drama film directed by James Kirkwood and starring Mary Miles Minter. It is one of approximately a dozen of Minter's films known to have survived. The film was restored in 2004 and was shown along with The Innocence of Lizette (1916) at a Dutch film festival.

== Plot ==
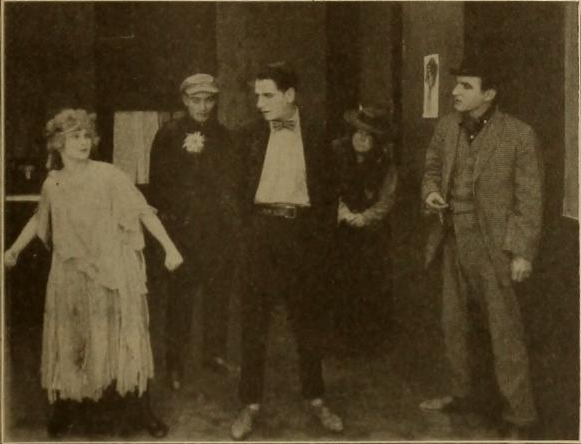
Mary Miles Minter in "A Dream or Two Ago"

As described in Motography magazine:

The mother of Millicent Hawthorne prefers society to home life and neglects her daughter. One day the child, then about five years old, runs away, intending to buy a gift for her mother. She is injured when a gang of thieves break into the jewelry store. Unable to remember her name or address, she is cared for by Mother Gumph, leader of the gang. In this environment she grows up, becoming a pickpocket of some ability. She is happy in this life and only in dreams remembers dimly another existence.

One night she aids the gang in robbing the Hawthorne home, and at the sight of the familiar rooms she is puzzled but still unable to remember.

In the meantime, her mother, overcome by remorse after her child is lost, gives up her frivolous diversions and devotes her time to charity. Her father, on the contrary, becomes the owner of a notorious café which he manages through Kraft. One day Kraft meets Millicent and offers her a position as a dancer. The first evening she dances Mrs. Hawthorne, on a tour of investigation, enters the place and is saddened at conditions.

That evening Mrs. Hawthorne learns who really owns the café, and begs her husband to give it up, telling him of the pathetic little dancer she saw there. He refuses but changes his mind when a little later word is brought from a dying member of the gang of the real identity of Millicent and he knows that the dancer is his own daughter. Millicent is rescued from Kraft and through an operation her memory is restored. And only as a dream does she remember her career as a thief.

== Cast ==
- Mary Miles Minter - Millicent Hawthorne
- Dodo Newton - Millicent (age 5)
- Lizette Thorne - Her Mother
- Clarence Burton - Her Father
- John Gough - Humpy
- Orral Humphrey - Kraft
- Gertrude Le Brandt
