= Environment (1917 film) =

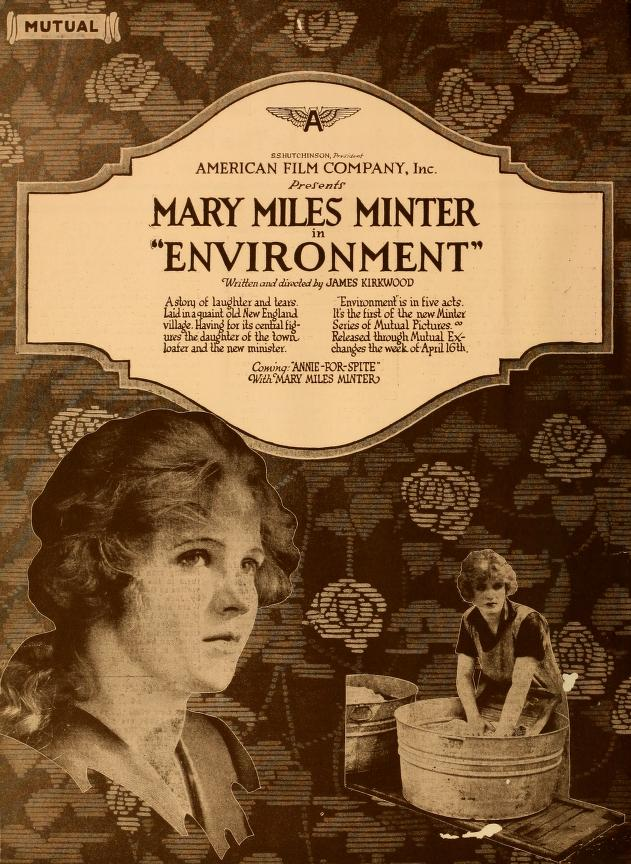
- Advertisement
- Directed by: James Kirkwood
- Written by: James Hughes
- Starring: Mary Miles Minter
- Distributed by: Mutual Film
- Release date: April 16, 1917
- Running time: 5 reels
- Country: United States
- Language: Silent (English intertitles)

Environment is a 1917 American silent drama film directed by James Kirkwood and starring Mary Miles Minter. As with many of Minter's features, it is believed to be a lost film. It is one of ten Minter films to also feature her older sister Margaret Shelby in a supporting role.

== Plot ==
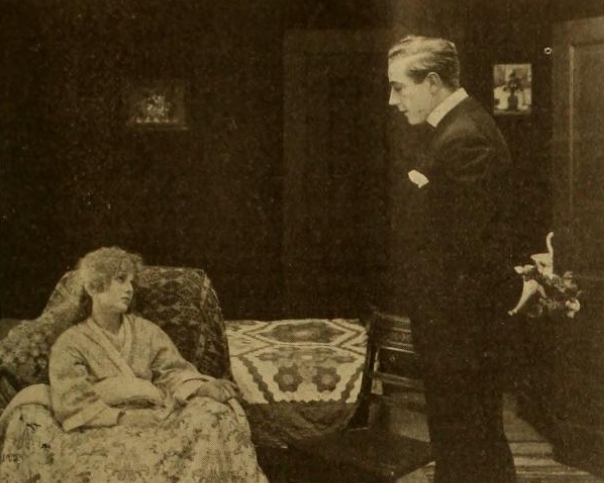
Mary Miles Minter and George Fisher in "Environment" (1917)

As described in film magazines, Elizabeth "Liz" Simpkins is the motherless daughter of John Simpkins, the town drunk. Despite the challenges of her home life, Liz manages to graduate with honours from the village high school, even though she has to make her own graduation dress and attend the ceremony alone. She then attempts to support her father and herself by taking in laundry. The village minister, Henry Pennfield, takes an interest in Liz and develops an attraction to her, which she reciprocates.

Meanwhile, Mildred Holcombe, a rich society girl of the village, has fallen in love with Arnold Brice, who claims to be a travelling artist but is in fact selling forgeries. When her disapproving brother Arthur is about to catch Mildred in a clandestine tryst with Brice, Liz hurries to warn the other girl. Mildred is able to flee but Brice traps Liz in his quarters, and when Arthur Holcombe arrives he misinterprets the situation and accuses Liz of having an affair with Brice.

Liz is unwilling to divulge Mildred's secret, and so the village authorities meet to decide what to do with her. Meanwhile, Liz's father has grown increasingly ill through drinking, and he passes away, leaving Liz an orphan. The authorities decide that Liz must be sent to an institution on account of her supposed inappropriate behaviour.

Liz pleads with Mildred to tell the truth and clear her good name, but Mildred refuses. Pennfield, however, has overheard this conversation. He reveals the truth to Arthur Holcombe, sees that Brice leaves town, resigns his position as minister, and announces that he will wed Liz Simpkins.

== Cast ==
- Mary Miles Minter as Liz Simpkins
- George Fisher as Henry Pennfield
- Harvey Clark as John Simpkins
- George Periolat as David Holcombe
- Emma Kluge as Mrs. Holcombe
- Margaret Shelby as Mildred Holcombe
- Arthur Howard as Arthur Holcombe
- Gayne Whitman as Arnold Brice (credited as Al Vosburgh)
- Lucille Ward as Mrs. Bloom
- John Vosper as Reuben (credited as Jack Vosburgh)
