= A Cumberland Romance =

1920 film directed by Charles Maigne

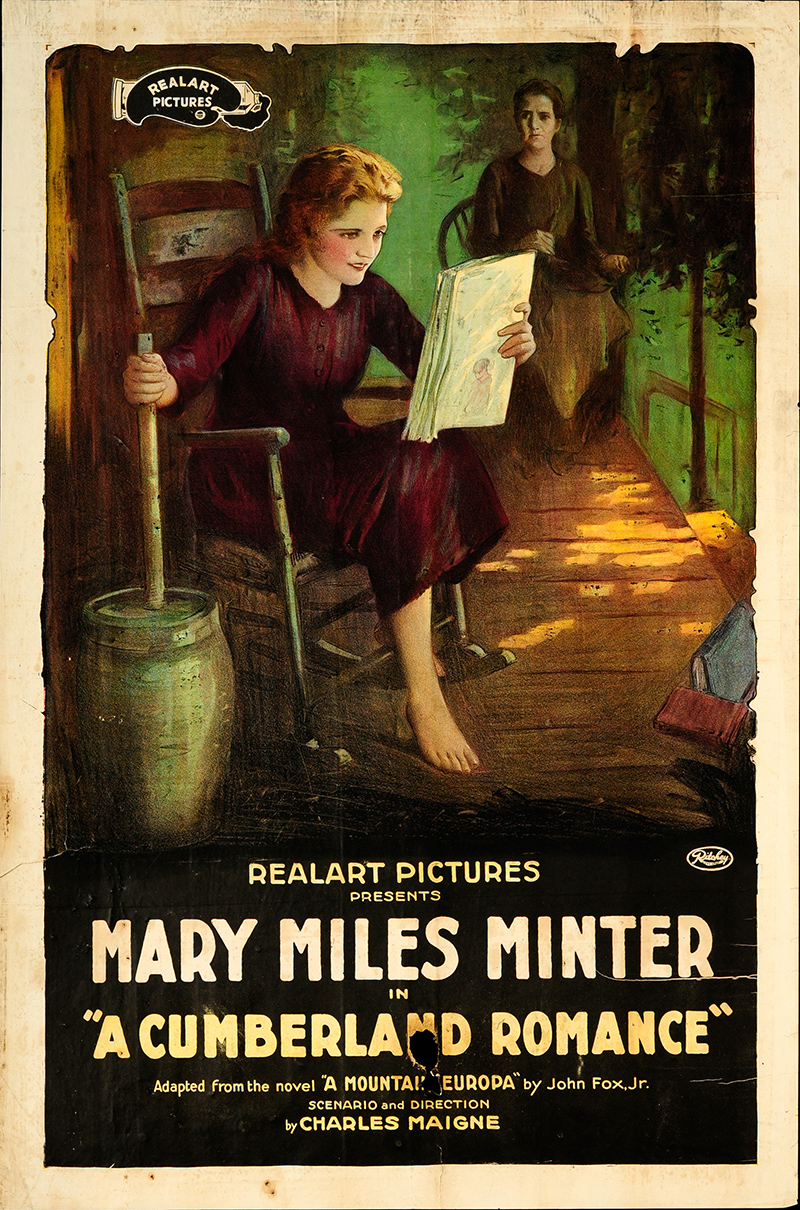
- Theatrical release poster
- Directed by: Charles Maigne
- Screenplay by: Charles Maigne
- Based on: A Mountain Europa by John Fox Jr.
- Starring: Mary Miles Minter; Monte Blue; John Bowers
- Cinematography: Faxon M. Dean
- Production company: Realart Pictures Corporation
- Distributed by: Realart Pictures Corporation
- Release date: August 6, 1920
- Running time: 6 reels
- Country: United States
- Language: Silent (English intertitles)

A Cumberland Romance is a 1920 American silent drama film written and directed by Charles Maigne and starring Mary Miles Minter and Monte Blue, based on the 1899 novel A Mountain Europa by John Fox Jr. Maigne also wrote the screenplay. It is one of approximately a dozen of Minter's features still known to survive today.

== Plot ==
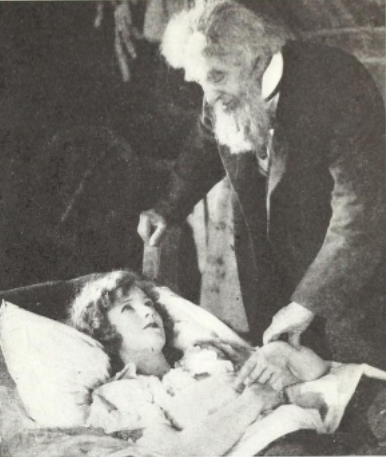
Mary Miles Minter in "A Cumberland Romance" (1920)

As described in film magazine reviews, Easter Hicks, a mountain girl, meets Clayton, an engineer from the city, when she is on her way to market. Easter is fascinated by the "furriner" (foreigner) from the city, and despite her crude dress and rough mannerisms, Clayton is equally taken with her. Sherd Raines, a young circuit rider of the mountains, is also in love with Easter.

"Pap" Hicks, Easter's drunkard father, sees Clayton with Easter and vows to shoot the city man, but Sherd overpowers him. Later, Sherd wrestles with his own jealousy and contemplates shooting Clayton, but his faith will not allow him to take a human life. The next day, when Clayton is about to leave for the city, Easter runs after him and tearfully declares her love. Clayton decides to marry her, and Sherd, putting aside his love for Easter, agrees to perform the marriage ceremony.

On the day of the wedding, as Clayton's mother and sister arrive, the contrast between the city folk and the mountain folk could not be clearer. "Pap" Hicks arrives to the wedding drunk, and when Clayton will not share a drink with him, he takes offence and threatens to shoot his future son-in-law. Sherd gets between them to try to save Clayton, but when "Pap" pulls the trigger, it is Easter who is struck with the bullet.

Stricken with grief at the thought that he has killed his daughter, "Pap" swears to God that he will never drink again if only Easter should pull through. Easter recovers, and realises that she and Clayton cannot be happy together, as the differences between them are too great. She sends him back to the city and asks to see Sherd, understanding that she loves the circuit rider after all.

The September 1920 edition of "Picture-Play" features a detailed fiction adaptation of the film, complete with several stills from the picture. The July 3rd, 1920 edition of Motion Picture News lists a musical cue sheet for the film.

== Cast ==
- Mary Miles Minter as Easter Hicks
- Monte Blue as Sherd Raines
- John Bowers as Clayton
- Guy Oliver as Pap Hicks
- Martha Mattox as Ma Hicks
- Robert Brower as Mountain Bishop
