= Periwinkle (film) =

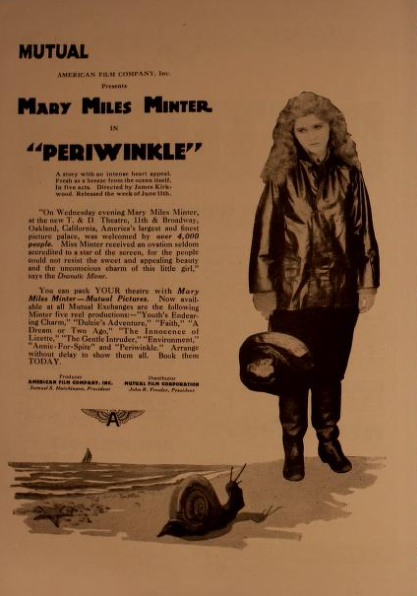
- Directed by: James Kirkwood
- Written by: Julian La Mothe; William F. Payson (story)
- Starring: Mary Miles Minter
- Distributed by: Mutual Film
- Release date: June 11, 1917
- Running time: 5 reels
- Country: United States
- Language: Silent (English intertitles)

Periwinkle is a 1917 American silent film directed by James Kirkwood and starring Mary Miles Minter. It was based on the 1910 novel Periwinkle; an Idyl of the Dunes written by William Farquhar Payson. As with many of Minter's features, it is thought to be a lost film.

== Plot ==
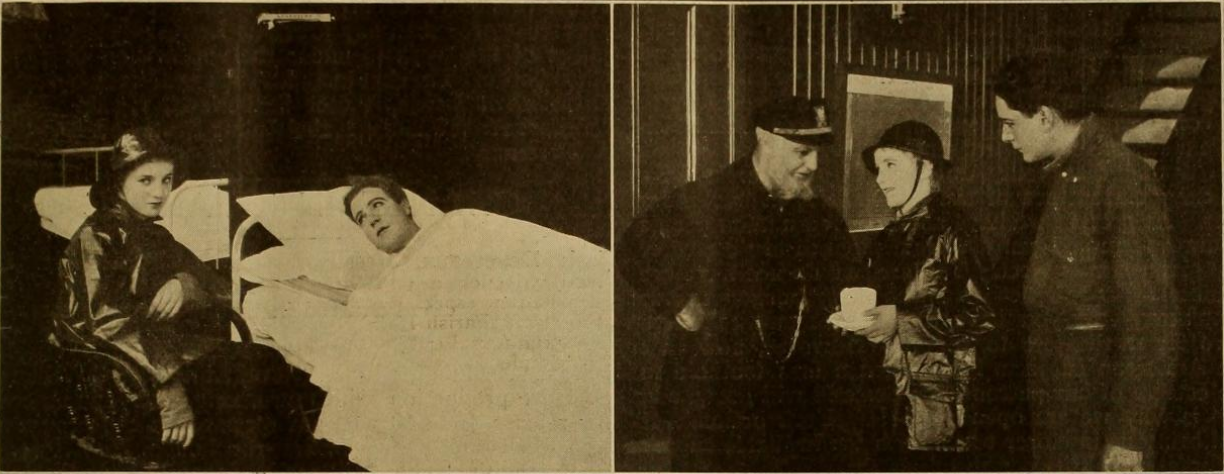
Mary Miles Minter in two scenes from "Periwinkle" (1917)

As described in various film magazine reviews, Periwinkle was rescued from a shipwreck as a baby by the members of a remote coast-guard station. She is raised by Ann Scudder and her elderly father Ephraim, and cared for by all of the men at the coastguard station. When she grows older, she helps them when there are shipwrecks.

One night, Periwinkle helps to rescue Dick Langdon, a wealthy and carefree New York socialite, from the wreck of his yacht. She nurses him back to health at the coast-guard station, where they fall in love. Langdon, however, is engaged to another, and Periwinkle is heartbroken when he recovers and is due to leave.

Meanwhile, realising that her adopted daughter loves Langdon, Ann Scudder finds the address of Langdon's fiancée and writes to her. Ann receives a telegram in reply, informing her that, in Langdon's absence, his fiancée has married another. She rushes to tell Langdon and Periwinkle and, with the approval of the men of the coast-guard station, the two are free to wed.

== Cast ==
- Mary Miles Minter - Periwinkle
- George Fisher - Richard Langdon Evans
- Arthur Howard - Jim Curran
- Clarence Burton - Sam Coffin
- Allan Forrest - Ira
- Harvey Clark - Captain Sears
- George Periolat - Ephraim Rawlins
- Anne Schaefer - Ann Scudder
- George Ahearn - Mortimer Hale
