= The Nurse (1912 film) =

1912 American dramatic short film

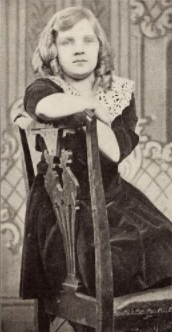
- Still of Juliet Shelby in "The Nurse" (1912)
- Directed by: Pat Powers
- Produced by: Pat Powers
- Starring: Mary Miles Minter
- Production company: Powers Picture Plays
- Distributed by: Motion Picture Distributors and Sales Company
- Release date: February 6, 1912 (United States)
- Running time: 11 minutes
- Country: United States
- Language: English

The Nurse is a 1912 American dramatic short film starring Mary Miles Minter. It is approximately 11 minutes long. This is Minter's first screen appearance, and the only one of her films where she is billed as Juliet Shelby, the stage name by which she was known from appearing in "The Littlest Rebel." As with many of Minter's features, it is believed to be a lost film.

== Plot ==
As described in The Moving Picture World:

There is an old saying which tells us that we cannot know people fully well until we have lived under the same roof as them. If the wife in this story had known it, she might never have entertained the friend who came to visit her; for it is this same friend, the chum of her girlhood days, who opens the first chapter of an intrigue which wrecks the happy home. But there is a Providence which presides over such matters and which in this case, sends a representative to earth, so to speak. This envoy is a little daughter of the couple through whom fate pulls her strings in such a way that before the picture is finished, her little arms are drawing her separated parents together into loving embrace.

== Cast (incomplete) ==
- Mary Miles Minter as the daughter (billed as Juliet Shelby)
- Ethel Elder as the mother
