= James Kirkwood Sr. =

American actor and film director

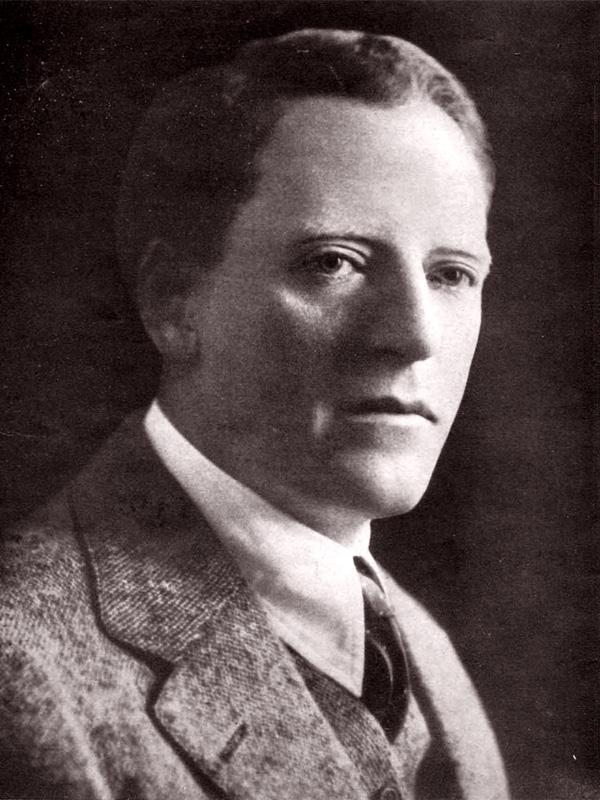
- Born: February 22, 1876; Grand Rapids, Michigan, U.S.
- Died: August 24, 1963 (aged 87); Woodland Hills, California, U.S.
- Occupations: Actor, film director
- Years active: 1909–1956
- Spouses: Gertrude Robinson (m. 1916; div. 1923) Lila Lee (m. 1923; div. 1931) Beatrice Powers Kirkwood (m. 1931; div. 1934) Marjorie Davidson (m. 1940, divorced)
- Children: 4, including James Kirkwood Jr.

James Cornelius Kirkwood Sr. (February 22, 1876 – August 24, 1963) was an American actor and director.

== Biography ==
Kirkwood debuted on screen in 1909 and was soon playing leads for D. W. Griffith. He started directing in 1912, and became a favorite of Mary Pickford, with whom he is rumored to have had an affair. In 1923, he married actress Lila Lee; with her, he had a son, James Kirkwood Jr., who became a successful writer, winning both a Tony Award and a Pulitzer Prize for A Chorus Line. Previously he had been married to Gertrude Robinson, with whom he also had a child. During his marriage to Robinson, he had an affair with Mary Miles Minter, who was 15 at the time. They "married" without clergy in the countryside near Santa Barbara. Their relationship ended after Minter became pregnant with Kirkwood's child and underwent an abortion.

In 1931, he married actress Beatrice Powers, and had a daughter, Joan Mary Kirkwood, with her. They divorced in 1934, with Powers citing mental cruelty. He married Marjorie Davidson (1920–2008) in 1940, and had a son with her, Terrance Michael Kirkwood (born 1941).

He was George Melford's original choice for the starring role of Sheik Ahmed Ben Hassan in The Sheik, which was later famously passed to Rudolph Valentino. His directing career fizzled in 1920, but he continued acting well into the 1950s. His film career would span more than two hundred films over nearly a half century.

He died at the Motion Picture & Television Country House and Hospital.

== Selected filmography ==
- A Corner in Wheat (1909 short) – The Farmer
- At the Altar (1909 short)
- The Lonely Villa (1909 short) – Among Rescuers
- The Hessian Renegades (1909 short) – Messenger's Father
- Pippa Passes (1909 short) – Jules
- Fools of Fate (1909 short) – Ben Webster
- Nursing a Viper (1909 short) – In Mob
- The Death Disc: A Story of the Cromwellian Period (1909 short) – Cromwell's Advisor
- The Red Man's View (1909 short) – Silver Eagle's Father – the Tribal Spokesman (uncredited)
- In Little Italy (1909 short) – The Sheriff
- To Save Her Soul (1909 short) – Backstage at Debut / At Party
- The Day After (1909 short) – Party Guest
- The Rocky Road (1910 short) – The Best Man
- The Woman from Mellon's (1910 short) – The Minister
- The Modern Prodigal (1910 short)
- The Bridal Room (1912 short) – Minor Role
- The Left-Handed Man (1913 short) – The Old Soldier
- The House of Discord (1913 short) – The Wife's Sweetheart
- Home, Sweet Home (1914) – The Mother's Son
- The Eagle's Mate (1914) – Lancer Morne
- Behind the Scenes (1914) – Steve Hunter
- The Green-Eyed Devil (1914 short, director)
- Lord Chumley (1914 short, director)
- Cinderella (1914 short, director)
- Strongheart (1914 short, director)
- The Floor Above (1914, director)
- Gambier's Advocate (1915) – Stephen Gambier
- Little Pal (1915, director) – Minor Role (uncredited)
- The Heart of Jennifer (1915, director) – James Murray
- Fanchon the Cricket (1915, director)
- The Foundling (1916) – Detective
- The Lost Bridegroom (1916, director)
- Susie Snowflake (1916, director)
- Dulcie's Adventure (1916, director)
- Faith (1916, director)
- The Innocence of Lizette (1916, director)
- A Dream or Two Ago (1916, director)
- Over There (1917, director)
- The Gentle Intruder (1917, director)
- Environment (1917, director)
- Annie-for-Spite (1917, director)
- Periwinkle (1917, director)
- Melissa of the Hills (1917, director)
- The Struggle Everlasting (1918, director)
- The Uphill Path (1918, director)
- The Luck of the Irish (1920) – William Grogan
- The Scoffer (1920) – Dr. Stannard Wayne
- In the Heart of a Fool (1920) – Grant Adams
- The Forbidden Thing (1920) – Abel Blake
- The Branding Iron (1920) – Pierre Landis
- Love (1920) – Tom Chandler
- Man, Woman & Marriage (1921) – David Courtney
- Bob Hampton of Placer (1921) – Bob Hampton
- A Wise Fool (1921, extant; Library of Congress) – Jean Jacques Barbille
- The Great Impersonation (1921) – Sir Everard Dominey / Leopold von Ragastein
- The Man from Home (1922) – Daniel Forbes Pike
- Under Two Flags (1922) – Cpl. Victor
- Pink Gods (1922) – John Quelch
- The Sin Flood (1922) – O'Neill
- Ebb Tide (1922) – Robert Herrick
- You Are Guilty (1923) – Stephen Martin
- Human Wreckage (1923) – Alan MacFarland
- The Eagle's Feather (1923) – John Trent
- Ponjola (1923) – Lundi Druro
- Discontented Husbands (1924) – Michael Frazer
- Love's Whirlpool (1924) – Jim Reagan
- Wandering Husbands (1924) – George Moreland
- Broken Barriers (1924) – Ward Trenton
- Another Man's Wife (1924) – John Brand
- Circe, the Enchantress (1924) – Dr. Wesley Van Martyn
- The Painted Flapper (1924) – Richard Whitney
- Gerald Cranston's Lady (1924) – Gerald Cranston
- Secrets of the Night (1924 extant) – Robert Andrews
- The Top of the World (1925) – Guy Ranger / Burke Ranger
- The Police Patrol (1925) – Officer Jim Ryan
- That Royle Girl (1925) – Calvin Clarke
- Lover's Island (1925) – Jack Avery
- The Reckless Lady (1926) – Colonel Fleming
- The Wise Guy (1926) – Guy Watson
- Butterflies in the Rain (1926) – John Humphries
- Million Dollar Mystery (1927) – James Norton
- Someone to Love (1928) – Mr. Kendricks
- Black Waters (1929) – Rev. Eph Kelly / Tiger Larabee
- The Time, the Place and the Girl (1929) – The Professor
- Hearts in Exile (1929) – Baron Serge Palma
- The Devil's Holiday (1930) – Mark Stone
- Worldly Goods (1930) – John C. Tullock
- The Spoilers (1930) – Joe Dextry
- Young Sinners (1931) – John Gibson
- A Holy Terror (1931) – William Drew
- Transatlantic (1931) – Sigrid's Beau (uncredited)
- Over the Hill (1931) – Pa Shelby in Prologue
- The Rainbow Trail (1932) – Venters
- Charlie Chan's Chance (1932) – Inspector Flannery
- Cheaters at Play (1932) – Detective Crane
- She Wanted a Millionaire (1932) – Roger Norton
- Lena Rivers (1932) – Henry R. Graham
- Careless Lady (1932) – Judge
- My Pal, the King (1932) – Count DeMar
- Playthings of Desire (1933) – Jim Malvern
- Hired Wife (1934) – Philip Marlowe
- The Lady from Cheyenne (1941) – Politician
- No Hands on the Clock (1941) – Warren Benedict
- Tennessee Johnson (1942) – Senator (uncredited)
- Government Girl (1943) – Senator (uncredited)
- Madame Curie (1945) – Board Member (uncredited)
- The Spanish Main (1945) – Captain Spratlin (uncredited)
- Rendezvous with Annie (1946) – Walters
- I've Always Loved You (1946) – Murphy (uncredited)
- That Brennan Girl (1946) – John Van Derwin (uncredited)
- That's My Man (1947) – Racetrack Man (uncredited)
- Driftwood (1947) – Rev. MacDougal
- The Inside Story (1948) – Townsman (uncredited)
- The Untamed Breed (1948) – Sheriff (uncredited)
- Joan of Arc (1948) – Judge Mortemer (uncredited)
- Red Stallion in the Rockies (1949) – Judge Hardy
- The Doolins of Oklahoma (1949) – Reverend Mears (uncredited)
- Intruder in the Dust (1949) – Convict (uncredited)
- Roseanna McCoy (1949) – A Hatfield (uncredited)
- The Nevadan (1950) – Tex (uncredited)
- Fortunes of Captain Blood (1950) – Physician (uncredited)
- The Lone Ranger (1950, Episode: "Double Jeopardy") – Judge Henry Brady
- Stage to Tucson (1950) – Sheriff Pete Deuce (uncredited)
- Belle Le Grand (1951) – Judge (uncredited)
- Santa Fe (1951) – Surveyor (uncredited)
- Two of a Kind (1951) – Ben (uncredited)
- Man in the Saddle (1951) – Sheriff Medary (uncredited)
- I Dream of Jeanie (1952) – Doctor
- Winning of the West (1953) – Wagon Train Survivor (uncredited)
- The Sun Shines Bright (1953) – Gen. Fairfield
- Woman They Almost Lynched (1953) – Old Man (uncredited)
- The Last Posse (1953) – Judge Parker
- Sweethearts on Parade (1953) – Narrator (voice, uncredited)
- Passion (1954) – Don Rosendo (uncredited)
- Adventures of the Texas Kid: Border Ambush (1954) – Tim Johnson
- The Search for Bridey Murphy (1956) – Brian MacCarthy at Age 68
- Two Rode Together (1961) – Officer (uncredited) (final film role)
