= Mary Miles Minter =

American actress (1902–1984)

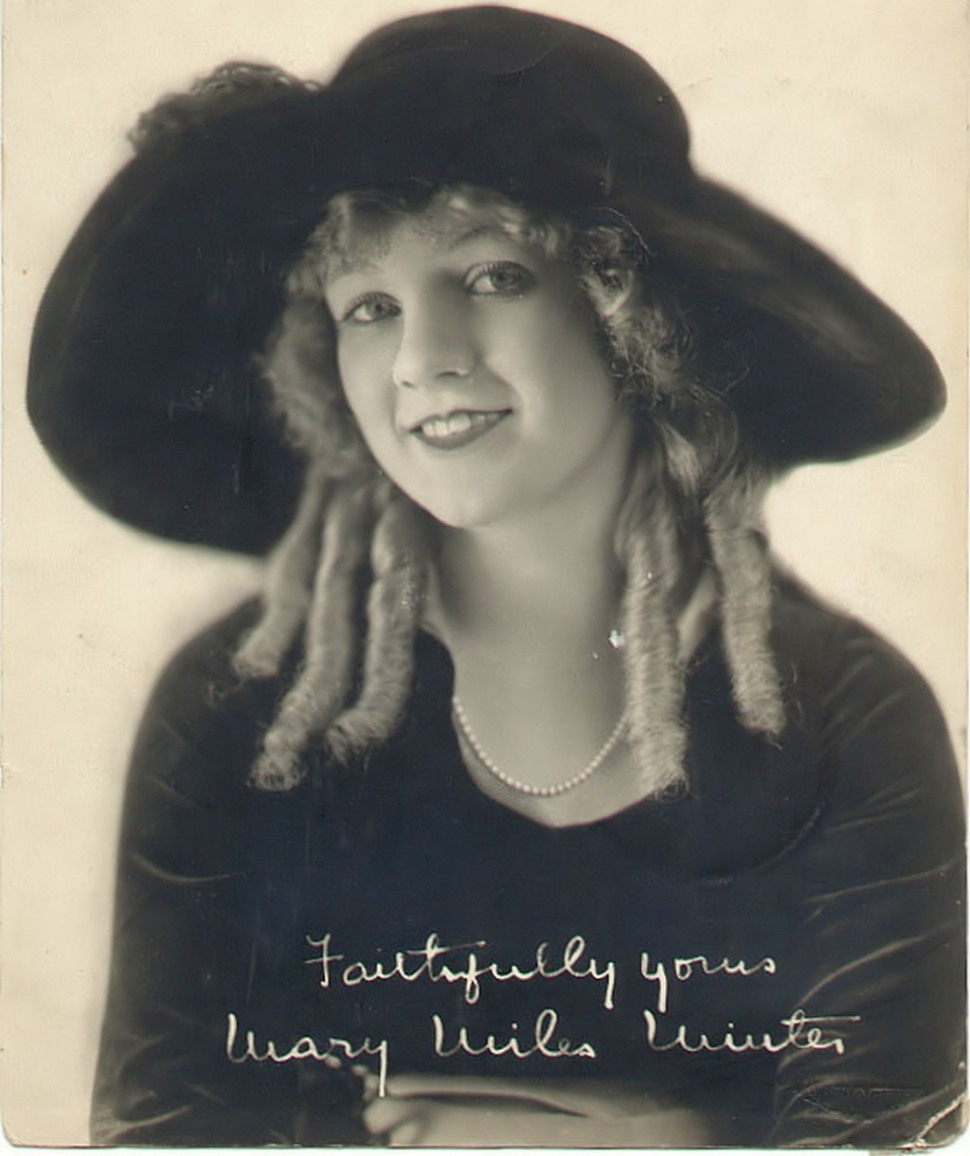
- Minter in 1923
- Born: Juliet Reilly; April 25, 1902; Shreveport, Louisiana, U.S.
- Died: August 4, 1984 (aged 82); Santa Monica, California, U.S.
- Other name: Juliet Shelby
- Occupation: Actress
- Years active: 1907–1923
- Spouse: Brandon O. Hildebrandt (m. 1957; died 1965)
- Mother: Charlotte Shelby
- Relatives: Margaret Shelby (sister)

Mary Miles Minter (born Juliet Reilly; April 25, 1902– August 4, 1984) was an American actress, and one of the leading ladies who established the early Hollywood star system. She appeared in 53 silent films from 1912 to 1923.

In 1922, Minter was involved in a scandal surrounding the murder of director William Desmond Taylor, for whom she professed her love. Gossip implicated her mother, former actress Charlotte Shelby, as the murderer, and as a result Minter's reputation was tarnished. She gave up her film career in 1923.

== Early life ==
Minter was born in Shreveport, Louisiana, the younger of two daughters born to J. Homer Reilly and Lily Pearl Miles (later known as Broadway actress Charlotte Shelby; 1877–1957). Her sister was Margaret Reilly, who later became an actress using the name Margaret Shelby.

== Career ==
=== Stage and film career ===
“Mary Miles Minter was far prettier than Mary Pickford, but she, unlike Miss Pickford, could not act. Although it must be admitted that when a star is as lovely to look at as Mary Miles Minter, acting does not really matter. One of her directors, Edward Sloman, said of her, ‘Without doubt, she was the best looking youngster I ever saw, and the lousiest actress.’”—Film historian Paul O’Dell in Griffith and Rise of Hollywood (1970)

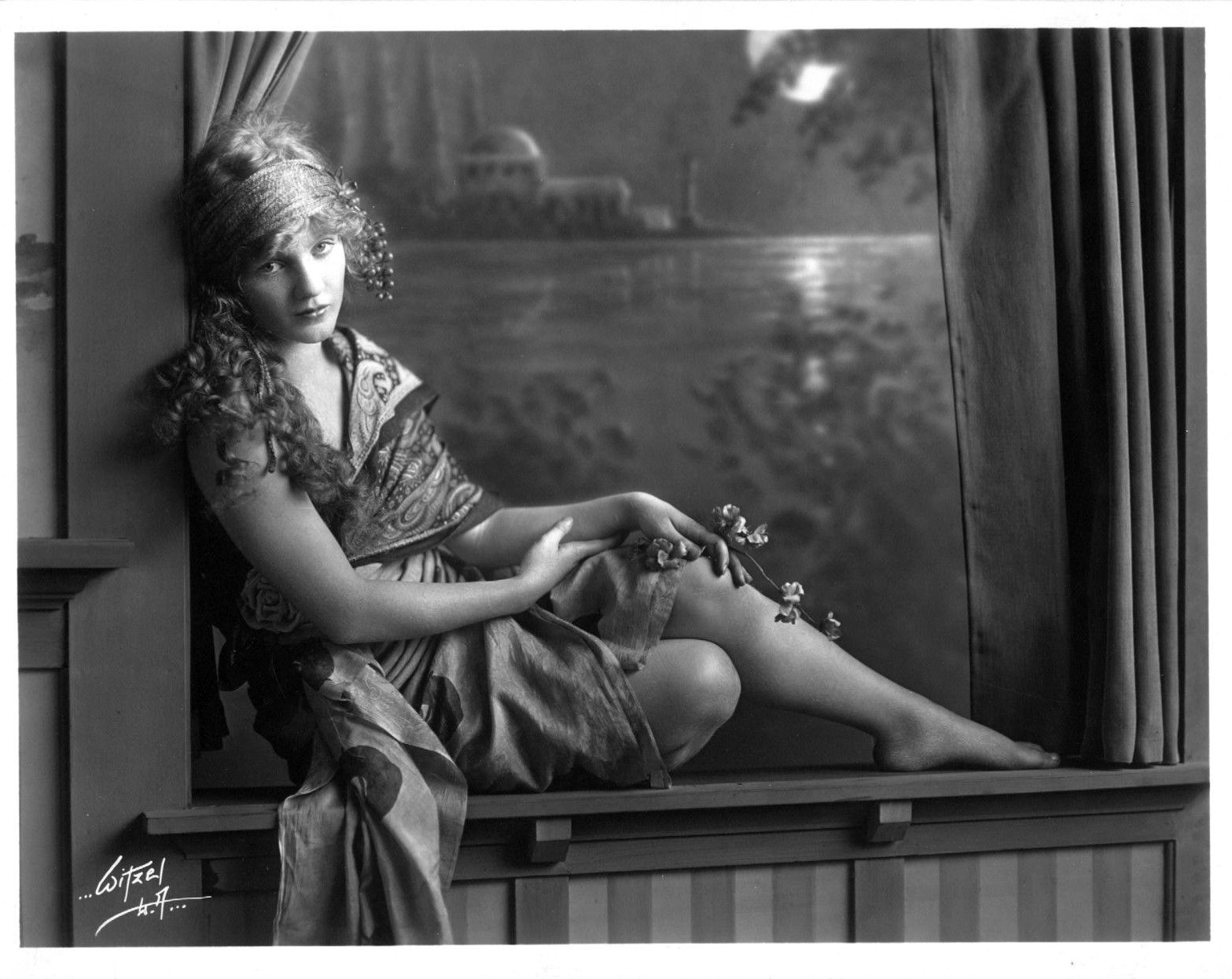
Minter, c. 1918

At the age of five, she accompanied her sister Margaret on an audition because no babysitter was available. She was noticed by the director and given her first part. She began her stage career and frequently was employed afterward, widely noted for both her talent and visual appeal. To avoid child labor laws while the 10-year-old was appearing in a play in Chicago in 1912, Charlotte Shelby obtained the birth certification of her older sister's deceased daughter from Louisiana, and Juliet became Mary Miles Minter.

In her screen debut, in which she was billed as Juliet Shelby, she appeared in the 1-reel short film The Nurse (1912). Her new stage name was applied, and Minter starred in the role as Viola Drayton, the fairy, in the 5-reel drama The Fairy and the Waif (1915). A reviewer in the New York Dramatic Mirror declared: “Mary Miles Minter is the greatest child actress to be seen either on stage or before the camera. She is exquisitely fascinating, sympathetically charming, and delightfully childlike and human.”

Minter's career steadily grew after that. She specialized in playing demure young women. With her photogenic features, blue eyes, and blonde curls, she emulated and later rivaled Mary Pickford.

Her first movie for director William Desmond Taylor was Anne of Green Gables (1919). It was well-received, and Taylor actively promoted Minter. According to Minter, a romantic relationship developed between them. However, Minter (who had grown up fatherless) said Taylor had reservations from the outset and later curtailed the romance, citing their 30-year age difference. Other people who knew Taylor and Minter said he never reciprocated her feelings.

Mary Miles Minter featured in a selection from the 1920 film Nurse Marjorie.

=== Scandal ===
On February 1, 1922, Taylor was murdered in his home, a two-story bungalow apartment on Alvarado Street, at the southeast corner of Alvarado and Maryland Street in the Westlake area of Los Angeles.

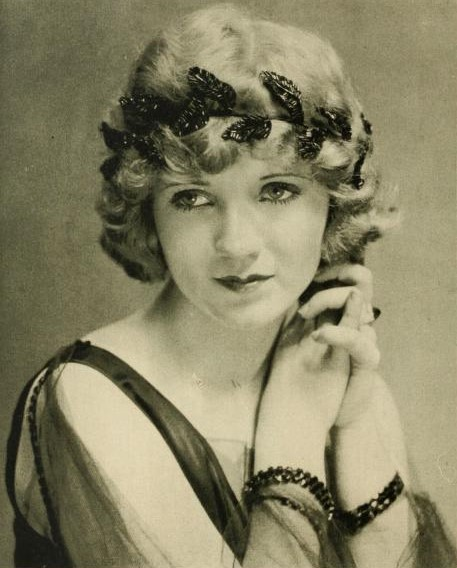
Minter in 1922

The ensuing scandal, following the Roscoe "Fatty" Arbuckle scandal of Labor Day weekend 1921, and Arbuckle's murder trials, was the subject of widespread media speculation and embellishment. Newspapers reported that coded love letters written by Minter had been found in his bungalow after his death (these were later shown to have been written three years earlier in 1919). Minter was at the height of her success, having starred in more than 50 films, and newspaper revelations of the 20-year-old star's association with the 49-year-old murdered director was cause for a sensational scandal.

There were several suspects (including her mother Charlotte Shelby) in the long investigation of Taylor's murder. In 1937, Minter publicly announced to the Los Angeles Examiner newspaper: "Now I demand that I either be prosecuted for the murder committed fifteen years ago, or exonerated completely. If the District Attorney has any evidence, he should prosecute. If not, then I should be exonerated... Shadows have been cast upon my reputation." Taylor's murder was never solved, but neither film actress Mabel Normand (who was the last person known to have seen Taylor alive), nor Minter was ever regarded as a serious suspect in the murder by police investigators.

In a 1970 interview, during which she described Taylor as her "mate," Minter recalled going to view Taylor's body immediately after the murder. In shock, she demanded to be used for a blood transfusion to revive him, not believing he was dead until she touched his body in the morgue: "That deadly cold... convinced me as nothing else could have done. No life can return to this man." She broke down and sobbed: "They crucified Jesus. Now they've crucified... They've crucified my mate."

=== Later career and retirement ===
Minter made four more motion pictures for Paramount, with her last being The Trail of the Lonesome Pine (1923). The studio did not renew her contract: she was 23 years old. She received many other offers but declined them all, saying she had never been happy as an actress.

== Personal life ==
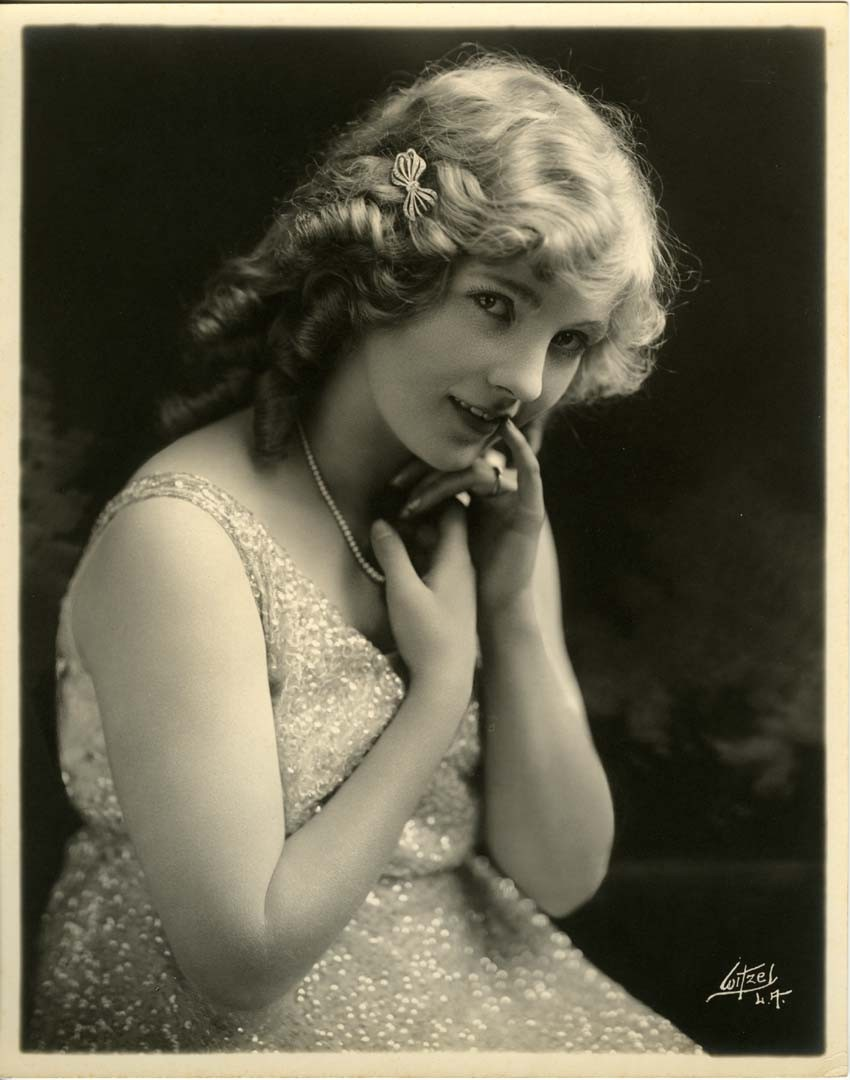
Minter by Witzel, circa 1917

Minter was involved with James Kirkwood Sr. for a time in 1916 when she was 15 years old. Minter and Kirkwood "married" without benefit of clergy in the countryside near Santa Barbara. The relationship ended after Minter became pregnant by Kirkwood and underwent an abortion, which was paid for by her mother.

In late 1922, several months after Taylor's death, Minter became involved romantically for a time with then-news correspondent of Los Angeles and movie critic Louis Sherwin, who had at one time been married to actress Maude Fealy.

In 1925, Minter sued her mother for an accounting of the money Shelby had received for her during her screen career. The case was settled out of court, with the settlement being signed by Minter and Shelby at the American consulate in Paris, France, on January 24, 1927.

In 1934, a hearing took place in Los Angeles, in which Hilda Desey, the proprietor of a dress shop on Wilshire Blvd., claimed that Minter entered her shop and took a tweed dress valued at $55.00 by force. Minter countered in court by stating that she had helped finance Miss Desey's dress shop and that she took the dress as she was owed interest. The deputy district attorney declined to issue a complaint for either petty theft or malicious mischief, as it was decided that there was no evidence of malicious intent on the part of Minter.

In 1957, Minter and real estate developer Brandon O. Hildebrandt (1898–1965) were married. They remained married until Hildebrandt's death in 1965.

== Later years ==
Minter commented she was content to live without her Hollywood career. She later reconciled with her mother and proclaimed her love for Taylor throughout her life. Minter's money had been invested in Los Angeles real estate, and she seems to have lived in relative comfort and prosperity. She later moved to a house in Santa Monica, California; her mother Charlotte Shelby died there in 1957.

In 1981, Minter was severely beaten in a burglary at her home in which more than $300,000 worth of antiques, china and jewelry were taken. A former live-in companion and three other people were charged with attempted murder and burglary. The police described her as a frail old woman, and people often were shocked to learn she had been a famous movie star.

Minter died in 1984 at age 82 from a stroke in Santa Monica. She was cremated, and her ashes were scattered at sea. For her contribution to movies, she has a star on the Hollywood Walk of Fame at 1724 Vine Street in Hollywood.

== Legacy ==
Much of Minter's work has been lost; of her 53 films, approximately a dozen are known to exist today. A print of her 1919 movie The Ghost of Rosy Taylor surfaced in New Zealand in the 1990s. Other known surviving movies include The Fairy and the Waif (1915), Youth's Endearing Charm (1916), A Dream or Two Ago (1916), The Innocence of Lizette (1916), The Eyes of Julia Deep (1918), Nurse Marjorie (1920), A Cumberland Romance (1920) and The Little Clown (1921).

Film historian Edward Wagenknecht provides this retrospective observation regarding Minter's film legacy:

How good an actress Mary Miles Minter was during her years of screen fame would now be hard to say. The saccharine vehicles in which she was generally presented were all too seldom afforded opportunities for acting...

Wagenknecht adds: “Miss Minter was well aware of this, young as she was, and deeply distressed by it.”

== Filmography ==
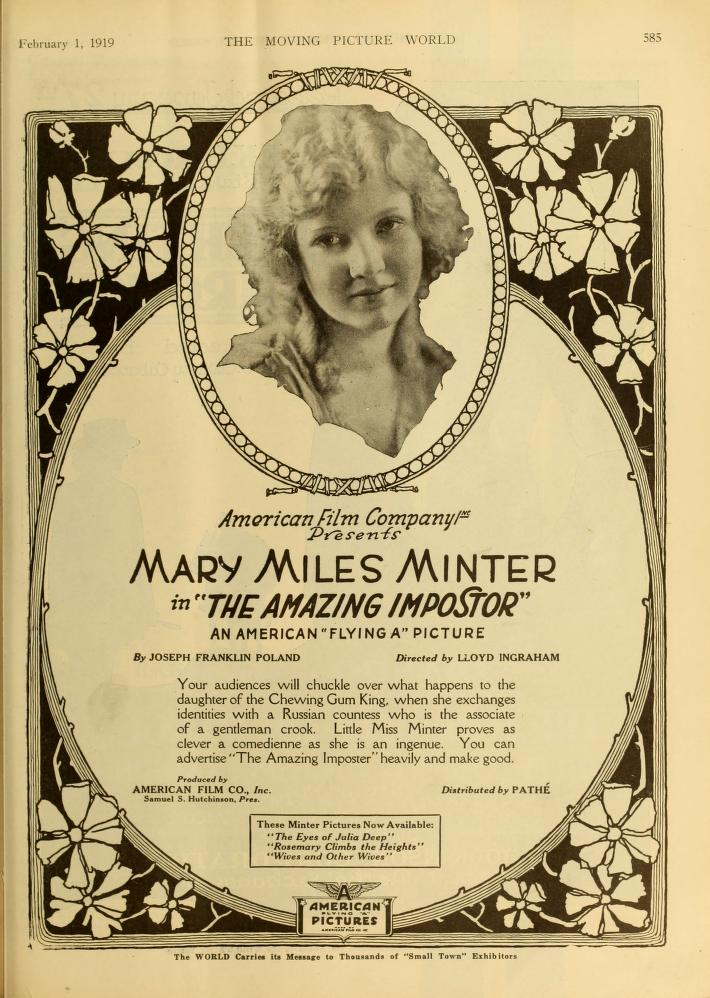
The Amazing Impostor (1919)

Year	Title	Role	Notes
1912	The Nurse	The Child	Lost film Credited as Juliet Shelby
1915	The Fairy and the Waif	Viola Drayton, the Fairy	
1915	Always in the Way	Dorothy North	Lost film
1915	Emmy of Stork's Nest	Emmy Garrett	Lost film
1915	Barbara Frietchie	Barbara, Mrs. Frietchie's granddaughter	Lost film
1916	Rose of the Alley	Nell Drogan	
1916	Dimples	Dimples	
1916	Lovely Mary	Mary Lane	Lost film
1916	Youth's Endearing Charm	Mary Wade	
1916	Dulcie's Adventure	Dulcie	Lost film
1916	Faith	Faith	
1916	A Dream or Two Ago	Millicent Hawthorne	
1916	The Innocence of Lizette	Lizette	
1917	The Gentle Intruder	Sylvia	
1917	Environment	Liz Simpkins	Lost film
1917	Annie-for-Spite	Annie Johnson	Lost film
1917	Periwinkle	Periwinkle	Lost film
1917	Melissa of the Hills	Melissa Stark	Lost film
1917	Somewhere in America	Rose Dorgan	
1917	Charity Castle	Charity	Lost film
1917	Her Country's Call	Jess Slocum	Lost film
1917	Peggy Leads the Way	Peggy Manners	
1917	The Mate of the Sally Ann	Sally	Lost film
1918	Beauty and the Rogue	Roberta Lee	Lost film
1918	Powers That Prey	Sylvia Grant	Lost film
1918	A Bit of Jade	Phyllis King	Lost film
1918	Social Briars	Iris Lee	Lost film
1918	The Ghost of Rosy Taylor	Rhoda Eldridge Sayles	
1918	The Eyes of Julia Deep	Julia Deep	
1918	Rosemary Climbs the Heights	Rosemary Van Voort	Lost film
1918	Wives and Other Wives	Robin Challoner	Lost film
1919	The Amazing Impostor	Joan Hope	Lost film
1919	The Intrusion of Isabel	Isabel Trevor	Lost film
1919	A Bachelor's Wife	Mary O'Rourke	Lost film
1919	Yvonne from Paris	Yvonne Halbert	Lost film
1919	Anne of Green Gables	Anne Shirley	Lost film
1920	Judy of Rogue's Harbor	Judy	Lost film
1920	Nurse Marjorie	Lady Marjorie Killonan	
1920	Jenny Be Good	Jenny Riano	Lost film
1920	A Cumberland Romance	Easter Hicks	
1920	Sweet Lavender	Lavender	Lost film
1920	Eyes of the Heart	Laura	Lost film
1921	All Soul's Eve	Alice Heath/Nora O'Hallahan	Lost film
1921	The Little Clown	Pat	
1921	Don't Call Me Little Girl	Jerry	Lost film
1921	Moonlight and Honeysuckle	Judith Baldwin	Lost film
1921	Her Winning Way	Ann Annington	Lost film
1922	Tillie	Tillie Getz	Lost film
1922	The Heart Specialist	Rosalie Beckwith	Lost film
1922	South of Suva	Phyllis Latimer	Lost film
1922	The Cowboy and the Lady	Jessica Westoon	Lost film
1923	Drums of Fate	Carol Dolliver	Lost film
1923	The Trail of the Lonesome Pine	June Tolliver	Lost film

== Sources ==
- Wagenknecht, Edward. 1962. The Movies in the Age of Innocence. University of Oklahoma Press, Norman, Oklahoma. OCLC: 305160
- O’Dell, Paul (1970). Griffith and the Rise of Hollywood (1970 ed.). New York: A. S. Barnes & Co. p. 163. ISBN 0-498-07718-7.
