= South of Suva =

1922 film by Frank John Urson

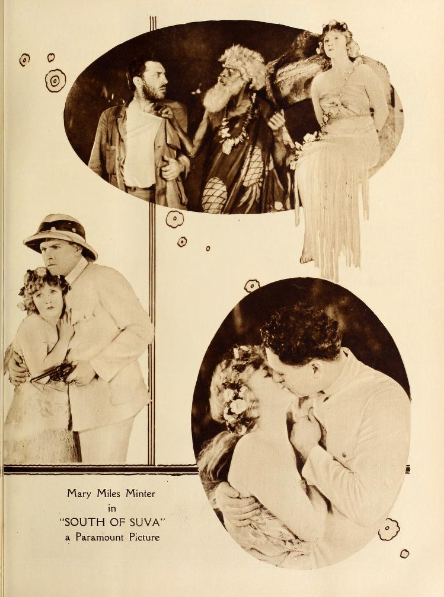
- Advertisement
- Directed by: Frank Urson
- Written by: Fred Myton (scenario)
- Story by: Ewart Adamson
- Produced by: Adolph Zukor (for Realart)
- Starring: Mary Miles Minter
- Cinematography: Allen M. Davey
- Production company: Realart Pictures Corporation
- Distributed by: Paramount Pictures
- Release date: July 16, 1922
- Running time: 5 reels; 4,639 feet
- Country: United States
- Language: Silent (English intertitles)

South of Suva is a 1922 American silent drama film starring Mary Miles Minter and directed by Frank Urson. It was adapted by Fred Myton from a story by Ewart Adamson. As with many of Minter's features, it is thought to be a lost film.

== Plot ==
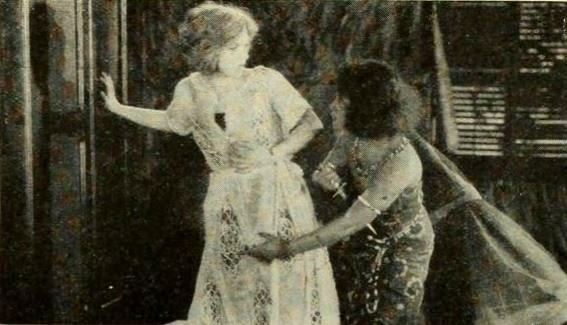
Mary Miles Minter in "South of Suva" (1922)

As described in various film magazine reviews, Phyllis Latimer is sailing to Suva in the Fiji Islands to join her husband Sydney, whom she has not seen since their marriage three years previously. She is travelling with Pauline Leonard, who is to meet with her ward John Webster (Bowers) on Suva, but Pauline instead chooses to accompany a man she has fallen in love with on board.

When Phyllis arrives at her husband's plantation, she finds that Sydney has degenerated into a brutal drunk and surrounded himself with native women. Phyllis gives him two weeks to reform himself, and when he fails to do so and she tries to leave, he attacks her. When Sydney is knocked unconscious by a falling canopy Phyllis flees, but she does not have the money to pay for her return passage.

Phyllis seeks refuge with John Webster, and uses her knowledge of Pauline from the voyage to successfully pose as his ward. A romance begins to develop between them, but when Webster is away, Sydney arrives at his house. He reveals Phyllis' true identity to Webster's assistant, and drags her back to his own plantation.

When Phyllis refuses to submit to her husband, Sydney hands her over to the natives to be a human sacrifice. Webster arrives just in time to save her, and in the ensuing conflict Sydney is killed. Once it has been made clear to him that she is not his ward, Phyllis and Webster are free to wed.

== Cast ==
- Mary Miles Minter as Phyllis Latimer
- Winifred Bryson as Pauline Leonard
- Walter Long as Sydney Latimer
- John Bowers as John Webster
- Roy Atwell as Marmaduke Grubb
- Fred Kelsey as Karl Swartz
- Larry Steers as Alfred Bowman (credited as Lawrence Steers)
- Benny Ayers as Native (uncredited)
- Bhogwan Singh as Native (uncredited)

== See also ==
- South Seas genre
