= Manon Lescaut (1914 film) =

- Directed by: Herbert Hall Winslow
- Written by: Abbé Prévost (novel); Herbert Hall Winslow
- Starring: Lina Cavalieri
- Cinematography: Edward Horn
- Production company: Playgoers Film Company
- Release date: May 18, 1914
- Country: United States
- Languages: Silent; English intertitles

Manon Lescaut is a 1914 American silent drama film directed by Herbert Hall Winslow and starring Lina Cavalieri, Lucien Muratore and Dorothy Arthur. It is an adaptation of the Abbé Prévost's novel Manon Lescaut (1731). It is now considered a lost film.

== Cast ==
- Lina Cavalieri as Manon Lescaut
- Lucien Muratore as Chevalier des Grieux
- Dorothy Arthur as Fifine
- William L. Abingdon as Baron de Bretigny
- Charles Hammond as Abbe Tiberge
- Frank H. Westerton as Lescaut
- Henry Weaver as Rochfort
- Frank Hardy as Synnelet
- Herbert Hall Winslow as Edouarde
- Walter Cecil as Governor of St. Lazare

== Bibliography ==
- Paul Fryer, Olga Usova. Lina Cavalieri: The Life of Opera's Greatest Beauty, 1874-1944. McFarland, 2003.
