= Blanche Upright =

American writer

Blanche Sarah Upright (née Caro; February 22, 1880 – April 3, 1948) was a writer in the United States. Her novel Valley of Content was adapted to film as Pleasure Mad in 1923 and staged in 1925. She appeared in the 1927 film Your Wife and Mine.

Born Blanche Sarah Caro, she married Louis Childs Upright. They owned the fabric business Caro & Upright at 717 Market Street in San Francisco. It also had an office in Los Angeles.

== Works ==
- The Valley of Content
- The Losing Gain
- The Altar of Friendship
- The Party of the Third

== Filmography ==
- Pleasure Mad (1923), an adaptation of her novel The Valley of Content
- Your Wife and Mine (1927) as Mrs. Coy
