= The Deuce of Spades =

1922 film by Charles Ray

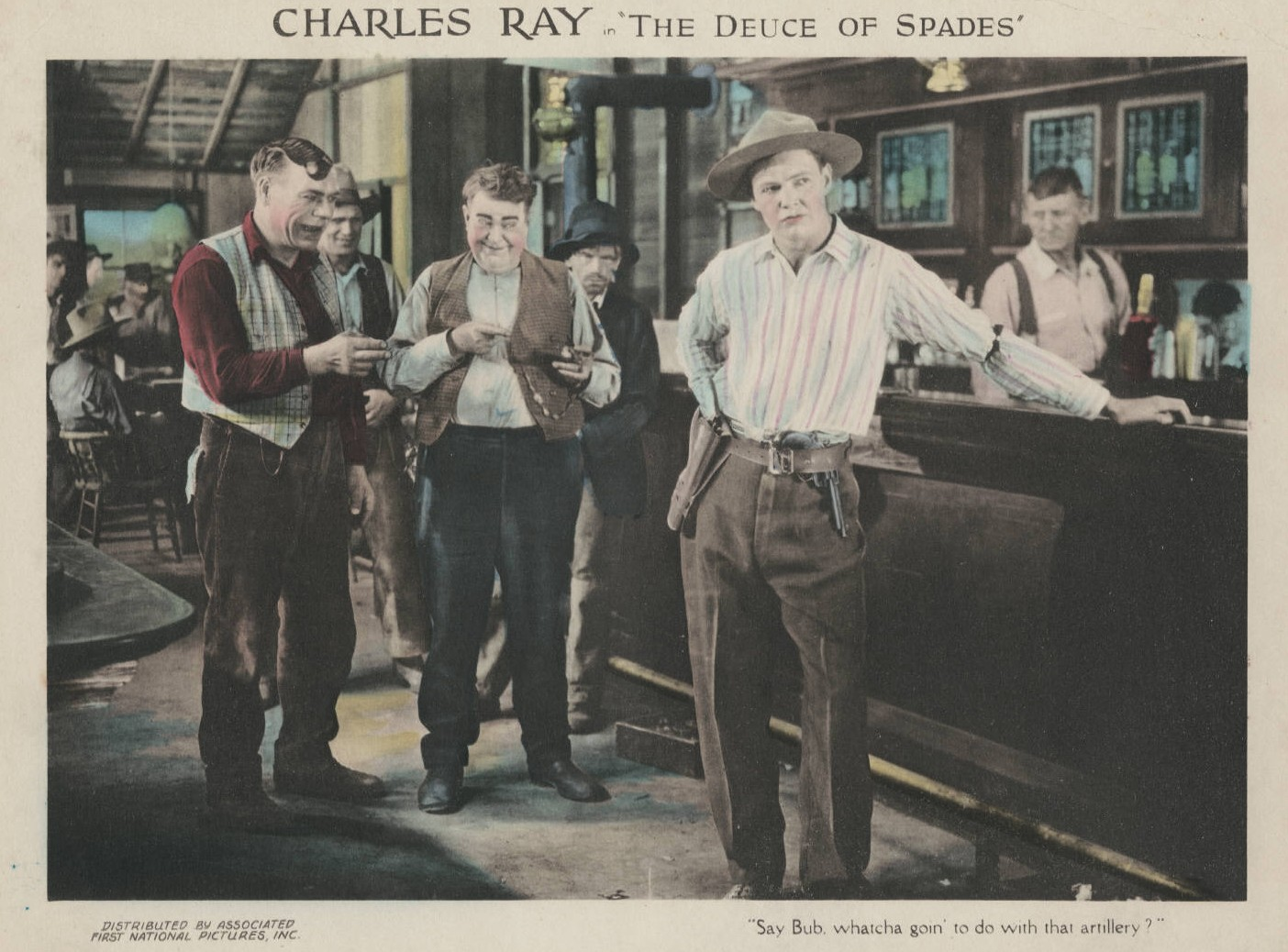
- Lobby card
- Directed by: Charles Ray
- Screenplay by: Alfred W. Alley; Richard Andres; Edward Withers
- Based on: The Weight of the Last Straw by Charles E. Van Loan
- Produced by: Charles Ray
- Starring: Charles Ray; Peggy Prevost; Lincoln Plumer; Phil Dunham; Andrew Arbuckle; Dick Sutherland
- Cinematography: George Rizard; Ellsworth H. Rumer
- Edited by: Harry L. Decker
- Production company: Charles Ray Productions
- Distributed by: Associated First National Pictures
- Release date: May 1922
- Running time: 50 minutes
- Country: United States
- Language: Silent (English intertitles)

The Deuce of Spades is a 1922 American comedy film directed by Charles Ray and written by Alfred W. Alley, Richard Andres and Edward Withers. The film stars Charles Ray, Peggy Prevost, Lincoln Plumer, Phil Dunham, Andrew Arbuckle, and Dick Sutherland. The film was released in May 1922, by Associated First National Pictures.

== Plot ==
As described in a film magazine, Amos, a Boston youth who yearns to "go west and grow up with the country," sells his restaurant and with the proceeds goes to Little Butte, Montana, a town of tumbledown shacks and little business. While getting something to eat in the only restaurant in town, Amos is robbed of his money and given a bill of sale for the restaurant. He converts the place into a clean up-to-date café and retains Sally the bright and efficient waitress. He feels sorry for her and tries his hand at matchmaking by coaxing in succession the local bartender, saloon bouncer, and others to visit the café, but Sally will have nothing to do with them. The restaurant prospers and Amos plans a trip back to Boston. At a junction he is fleeced of $800 in a card game and returns to Little Butte very much depressed. The townspeople, hearing of him being robbed by a card shark, decorate his restaurant with cards. Amos turns into a wild man and buys a couple of guns and shoots up the town. The gamblers who robbed him come into town and drop into the restaurant. Amos gives them sandwiches made of bread and a deuce of spades which he makes them eat. He recovers his $800 and chases the gamblers out of town. He then realizes that Sally is the woman for him.

== Cast ==
- Charles Ray as Amos
- Peggy Prevost as Sally (credited as Marjorie Maurice)
- Lincoln Plumer as Elkhorn Jenkins
- Phil Dunham as Edwin Dobbs
- Andrew Arbuckle as Fat Ed
- Dick Sutherland as Bouncer
- Jack Richardson as Hawk-nose
- J. P. Lockney as Restaurant Owner
- Gus Leonard as Peddler
- Bert Offord as The Sponge
- William Courtright as Driver Bill
