= Rose Plumer =

American actress

- Born: January 19, 1876; Fresno, California
- Died: March 3, 1955 (aged 79); Hollywood, California
- Other name: Rose Plummer
- Occupation: Film actress
- Spouse: Lincoln Plumer

Rose Spinney Plumer (January 19, 1876, California – March 3, 1955, Hollywood, California) was an American silent screen and character actress. She married actor Lincoln Plumer January 1, 1896.

== Career ==
In 1933, Plumer lost two teeth when struck in the face when hit by a club by another actor during the filming of The Bowery. She subsequently sued Twentieth Century. In 1940, she and another actor sued Burbank Theatres Ltd. to block the release of a film they appeared in due to three nude women being superimposed onto the footage. She was a board member of the Screen Extras Guild.

== Selected filmography ==
- The Family Secret (1924)
- Outside the Law (1930)
- The Painted Desert (1931)
- A House Divided (1931)
- The Phantom of Paris (1931)
- Law of the West (1932)
- The Bowery (1933)
- The Brand of Hate (1934)
- Opened by Mistake (1934)
- Circumstantial Evidence (1935)
- The Girl Said No (1937)
- The Wages of Sin (1938)
- Caught in the Act (1941)
- Inside the Law (1942)
- Bullets and Saddles (1943)
- Marshal of Reno (1944)
- Dark Mountain (1944)
- Phantom of the Plains (1945)
- The Madonna's Secret (1946)
- Big Town (1947)
- Manhandled (1949)
