= Winifred Bryson =

American actress (1892–1987)

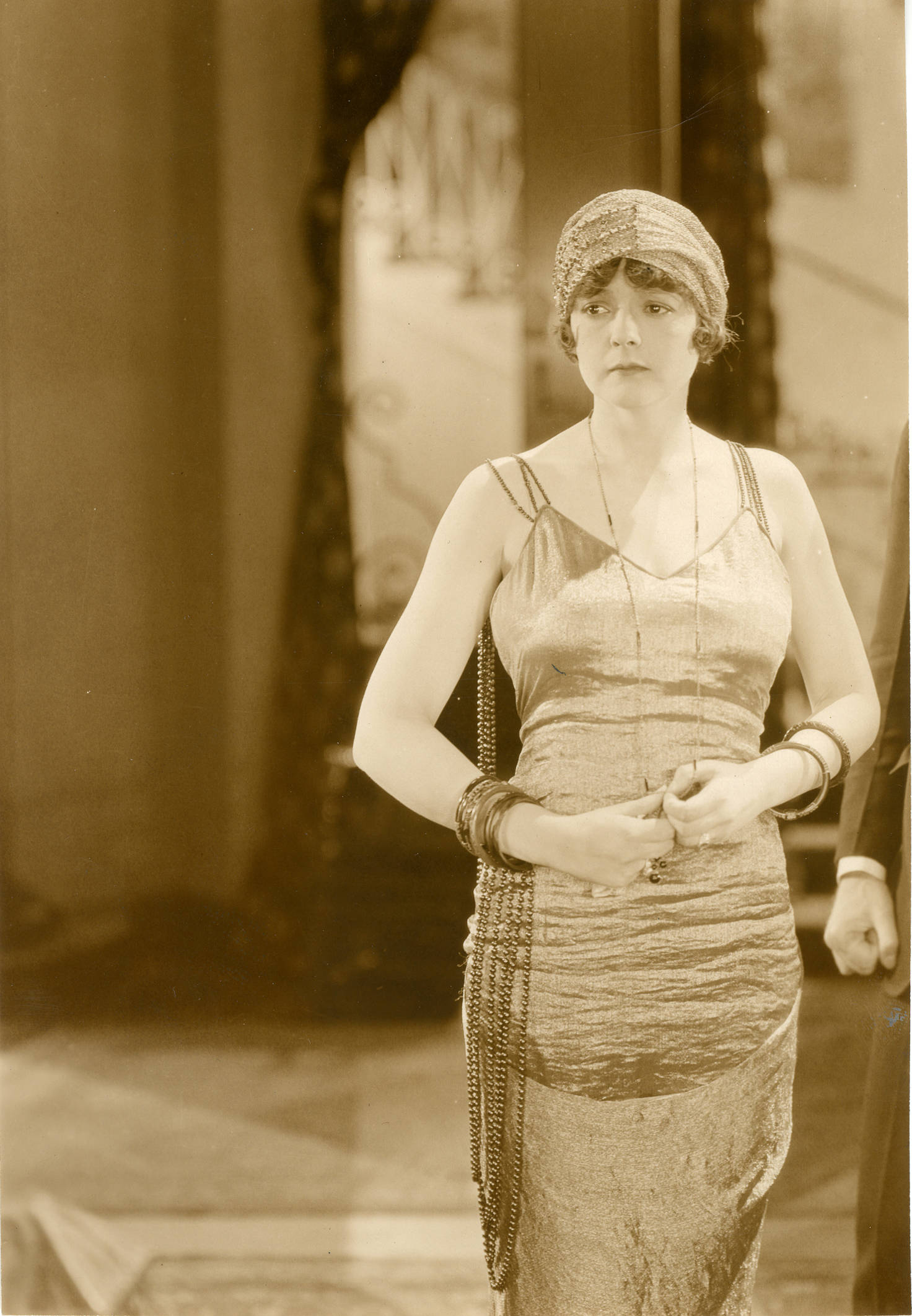
- Bryson in 1924
- Born: Winifred Brison; December 20, 1892; Los Angeles, California, United States
- Died: August 20, 1987 (aged 94); Los Angeles, California, U.S.
- Resting place: Forest Lawn Memorial Park, Glendale, California
- Occupation: Actress
- Years active: 1912–1928
- Spouses: Warner Baxter (m. 1918; died 1951): Ferdinand H. Manger

Winifred Bryson (born Winifred Brison; December 20, 1892 – August 20, 1987) was an American actress of the stage and of silent films. Born in Los Angeles, she began her career in her native city as a stage actress in 1912. In the 1910s she worked in American regional theaters and under contract with producer Oliver Morosco as a member of his repertory theatre company at the Burbank Theatre in Los Angeles. In 1917-1918 she starred in the Broadway production of Lombardi, Ltd. which was produced by Morosco. Also in the cast of this show was the actor Warner Baxter whom Bryson married while they were in this production. The couple later toured in this show throughout the United States and Canada from 1918 through 1920.

Bryson appeared in only one film in the 1910s, appearing as Annabel Lee in Peer Gynt (1915), and otherwise worked solely in the theater. In 1921 both she and her husband abandoned the stage and shifted into work as silent film actors. In total, Bryson acted in 19 films with her final screen appearance being in her only sound film, Adoration (1928). After this she chose to retire in order to support her husband's career. They remained married until Baxter's death in 1951. Bryson married a second time to Ferdinand H. Manger and lived in Los Angeles until her death at the age of 94.

== Early life ==
The daughter of Oliver A. and Annie Brison (nee Tilley), Winifred Brison was born on December 20, 1892 in Los Angeles, California. (Note: Her obituary in the Los Angeles Times states Bryson was a native of Los Angeles, and newspaper reporting while she was alive states she was born there. This is contradicted in some book sources which state she was born in Columbus, Ohio. However, this does not match primary documents or historic newspaper records. Her entry in the California, U.S., Death Index, 1940-1997 states she born in California. Her 1900 United States Federal Census and 1910 United States Federal Census records both state she was born in California. Her parents were married in Los Angeles, the city of her father's birth, in 1890. Local news stories refer to her as a Los Angeles native. It's highly unlikely that she was born in Ohio with zero primary documents or newspaper records providing evidence of that.) Her parents were both residents of Los Angeles (L.A.) when they married in that city on January 10, 1890. Her father was born in L.A., and her mother was originally from Iowa. At the time of the 1900 United States Federal Census, Winifred and her older sister Vivian were both living with their parents in San Bernardino, California. Her father was employed as an mechanical engineer in that city as early as 1899. The family moved back to L.A. in 1901. There Brison studied singing with tenor Marquis Ellis.

== Early career ==
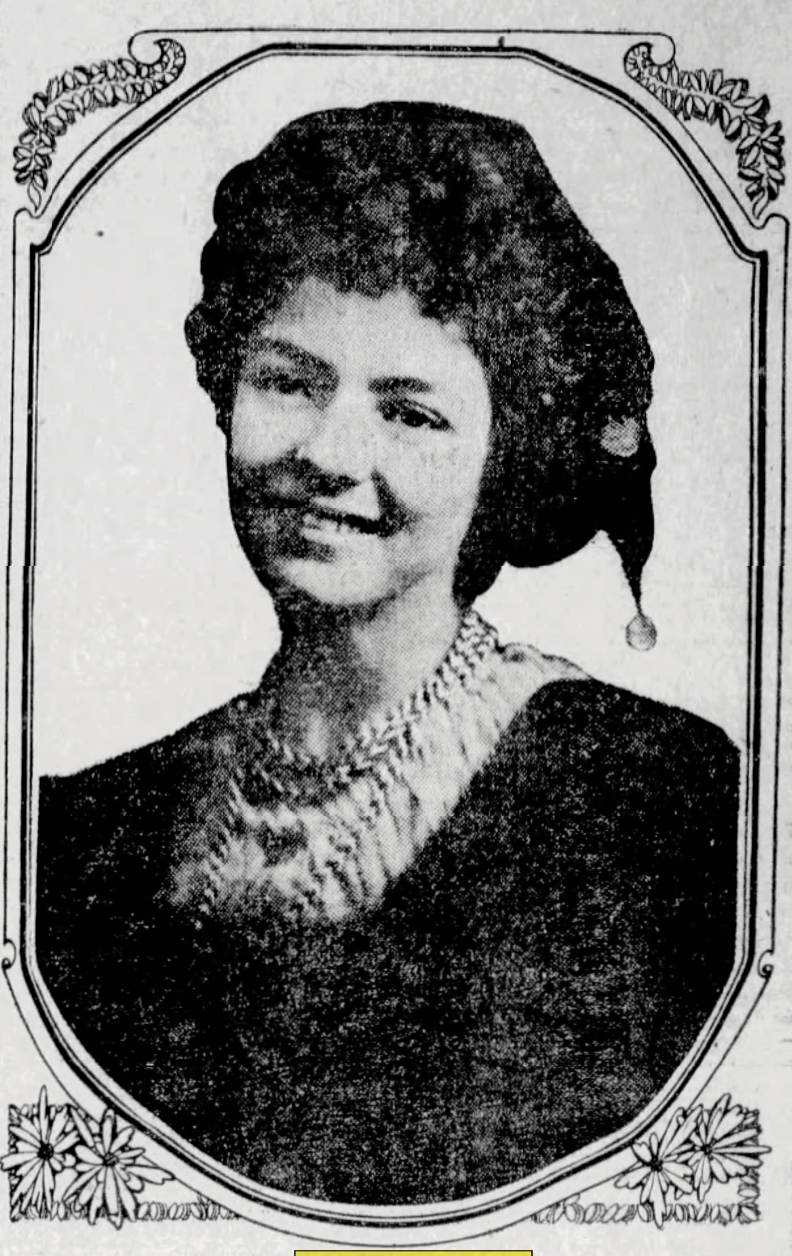
Winifrid Bryson in 1908.

Using the name Winifred Bryson, she made her stage debut in Los Angeles as the Irish maid Martha in Lee Wilson Dodd's Speed in early November 1912 with David Belasco's stock theatre company. She also appeared in a minor part in Owen Kildare and Walter Hackett's The Regeneration starring Bert Lytell; a production which opened at the Belasco Theatre in late November 1912. In January 1913 she performed at the Lyceum Theatre in L.A. as Minty in Mrs. Archie Cowper's play The Dairy Farm with Herschel Mayall in the leading part of Nathan Newkirk. That same month she performed as one of the neighbor's daughters, Betty, in May Robson and Charles Dazey's comedy A Night Out with Robson leading the cast at the Opal Theatre in Hollister, California. She then toured the United States in this production.

By the summer of 1913 Bryson was starring as Flash in the Chicago production of L. Frank Baum and Louis F. Gottschalk's musical play The Tik-Tok Man of Oz. She left this show to appear in the lead role of Marcella Burbeck in Zellah Covington and Jules Simonson's farce The Elixir of Youth at the Cort Theatre in August 1913. The following October she was back in L.A. starring as both the villainess Diane in the musical The Quaker Girl and Clara Spotswood in George M. Cohan's play Broadway Jones at the Burbank Theatre (BT). She ended the year performing the role of Madeline Price in The Girl at the Gate at the Gaiety Theatre in San Francisco with a cast led by Walter Catlett and Irene Franklin.

In the first part of 1914 Bryson starred in the musical How d'ye Do at the Morosco Theatre in Los Angeles, and then toured in California in this show. By March 1914 she was back in L.A. at the BT portraying the prima donna in Edgar Selwyn's The Country Boy with Donald Bowles in the title role. She appeared in leading roles in several more plays at that theater in 1914-1915, including parts in Winchell Smith's The Fortune Hunter (1914), Augustin MacHugh's Officer 666 (1914), Richard Barry's Brenda of the Woods (1914), Charles Klein's Maggie Pepper (1914), Kirke La Shelle and Owen Wister's The Virginian (1915), Avery Hopwood and Mary Roberts Rinehart's Seven Days (1915), and Jack Lait's Help Wanted (1915). She also created the role of the Russian dancer in the world premiere of Adolf Philipp's new musical Auction Pinochle which was give in 1914 at the BT.

While under contract with theatre producer Oliver Morosco at the BT, Bryson was loaned out with his permission to perform in the 1915 Paramount Pictures silent film Peer Gynt. She portrayed the part of Annabel Lee in this film with Cyril Maude in the title role. After this she was sent by Morosco on loan to the Baker Theater in Portland, Oregon where she made her debut in Willard Mack's So Much for So Much in January 1916. She worked as the leading lady of the Baker Stock Company in residence at the theater; with some of her parts including Jennie Summers in Mack's In Wyoming, May Joyce in Paul Armstrong's The Escape, Vera Revendal in Israel Zangwill's The Melting Pot, and Mary Norton in George M. Cohan's Seven Keys to Baldpate.

By the end of April 1916 Bryson was back at the BT in L.A. portraying Shirley Rossmore in Charles Klein's The Lion and the Mouse. She continued to perform at the B.T. that year in Owen Davis's Mile-a-Minute Kendall, Maude Fulton's Mary, and Grace Livingston Furniss's The Fibber.

== Lombardi, Ltd. ==
In 1917 Bryson went to New York to star on Broadway as Muriel in Fanny Hatton's Lombardi, Ltd. at the Morosco Theatre; playing the part over a lengthy period which lasted into the summer of 1918. The show was produced by Morosco. In the midst of playing this part she married one of her co-stars in this production, the actor Walter Baxter, in February 1918. She and her her husband subsequently toured nationally in this show in 1918-1919 to Salt Lake City, the Cort Theatre in San Francisco, the Isis Theatre in San Diego, the Cort Theatre in Chicago, the Plymouth Theatre in Boston, the Detroit Opera House, the Shubert Theatre in New Haven, Connecticut, the Grand Forks Opera House in North Dakota, the Auditorium Theater in Spokane, Washington, the Heilig Theater in Portland, Oregon, and the Lyric Theatre in Philadelphia among other venues.

In October 1919 Bryson created the role of Marjorie Schuyler in the world premiere of Anne Nichols's Seven Miles to Arden at the Majestic Theatre in Boston with a cast led by Grace Valentine. In early 1920 she and her husband toured Canada in Lombardi, Ltd. with performances in Saskatoon, Calgary, Edmonton, and Vancouver. This was followed by further performances of Lombardi, Ltd. in the United States in 1920; including stops at theaters in Washington state Idaho, Montana, Minnesota, Wisconsin, Oregon, Massachusetts, Connecticut, New Jersey, Maryland, and New York state.

== Later career ==
Bryson's later career shifted from the stage into film. In 1921 she and her husband returned to L.A. where the pair were under contract with Oliver Morosco's repertory theatre company. Morosco loaned Bryson out to the Realart Pictures Corporation to appear in films; including A Heart to Let (1921), Her Face Value (1921), and South of Suva (1922). After this she made Suzanna (1923) with Mack Sennett, and two films for the Fox Film Corporation: The Great Night (1922), and Truxton King (1923). She worked for a variety of studios hereafter. She made Crashin' Thru (1923) with the Film Booking Offices of America; both Pleasure Mad (1923) and Don't Doubt Your Husband (1924) with the Metro Pictures Corporation; The Lover of Camille (1924) for Warner Bros. Pictures; and Broken Barriers (1924) for Metro-Goldwyn-Mayer.

Bryson's most significant picture was The Hunchback of Notre Dame (1923) in which she played Fleur de Lys. It was made for Universal Pictures. Her other films for Universal included Thundering Dawn (1923), Behind the Curtain (1924),and The Law Forbids (1924). She starred opposite her husband in The Awful Truth (1925) which was made with the Producers Distributing Corporation. In a December 1925 interview she stated she was not accepting any more film roles because she felt it was too stressful on her marriage to have two working film actors. Her last film, Adoration (1928), was her only sound film. It was made by First National Pictures.

Bryson retired in the late 1920s to devote her energies to supporting her husband's career. She remained married to Warner until his death in 1951. She married a second time to Ferdinand H. Manger. Their marriage lasted until her death.

Winifred Bryson died in Los Angeles on August 20, 1987. Her inurnment was in Forest Lawn Memorial Park, Glendale, California.

== Filmography ==
- Peer Gynt (1915, as Annabel Lee)
- A Heart to Let (1921, as Julia Studley)
- Her Face Value (1921, as Laurette)
- South of Suva (1922, as Pauline Leonard)
- The Great Night (1922, as Papita Gonzales)
- Suzanna (1923, as Dolores)
- Truxton King (1923, as Olga Platanova)
- Crashin' Thru (1923, as Gracia)
- The Hunchback of Notre Dame (1923, as Fleur de Lys)
- Thundering Dawn (1923, as Lullaby Lou)
- Pleasure Mad (1923, as Geraldine de Lacy)
- Don't Doubt Your Husband (1924, as Alma Lane)
- The Law Forbids (1924, as Inez Lamont)
- Behind the Curtain (1924, as Laura Bailey)
- Broken Barriers (1924, as Mrs. Ward Trenton)
- Flirting with Love (1924, as Estelle van Arden)
- The Lover of Camille (1924, as The Unknown)
- The Awful Truth (1925, as Josephine)
- Adoration (1928, as baroness)

== Notes and references ==
=== Bibliography ===
- Doyle, Billy H.; Slide, Anthony (1995). The Ultimate Directory of Silent Screen Performers: A Necrology of Births and Deaths and Essays on 50 Lost Players. Bloomsbury Academic. ISBN 9780810829589.
- Munden, Kenneth W., ed. (1971). The American Film Institute Catalog of Motion Pictures Produced in the United States: Feature Films 1921–1930. R.R. Bowker Company. OCLC 664500075.
- Rubens, Alma (2015). Webb, Alexander; Rhodes, Gary D. (eds.). Alma Rubens, Silent Snowbird: Her Complete 1930 Memoir, with a New Biography and Filmography. McFarland & Company. ISBN 9781476616674.
- Wilson, Scott (2016). "Bryson, Winifred". Resting Places: The Burial Sites of More Than 14,000 Famous Persons, 3d Ed. McFarland & Company. ISBN 9781476625997.
