= Lincoln Plumer =

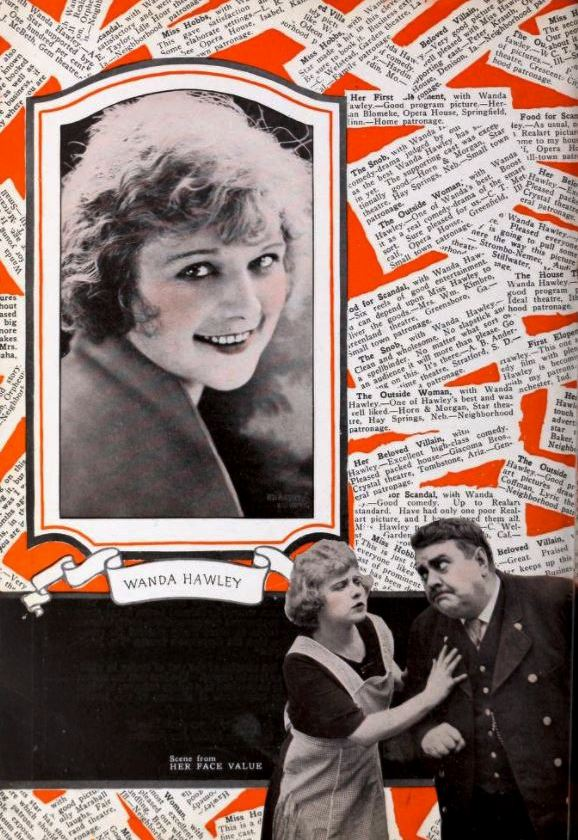
- Wanda Hawley and Plumer in Her Face Value (1921)
- Born: September 28, 1875; Maryland, US
- Died: February 14, 1928 (aged 52); Hollywood, California, US
- Resting place: Forest Lawn Memorial Park; Section M, L-225 (unmarked)
- Other name: Lincoln Plummer
- Occupation: Silent film actor
- Spouse: Rose Plumer

Lincoln J. Plumer (28 September 1875, in Maryland – 14 February 1928, in Hollywood, California) was an American silent film actor. He married actress Rose Plumer January 1, 1896. Plumer died of heart disease in 1928.

== Partial filmography ==
- The Floor Below (1918)
- The Deep Purple (1920)
- The Girl in the Taxi (1921)
- Her Face Value (1921)
- See My Lawyer (1921)
- The Ten Dollar Raise (1921)
- The Barnstormer (1922)
- The Deuce of Spades (1922)
- Confidence (1922)
- The Glory of Clementina (1922)
- Within the Law (1923)
- The Dangerous Maid (1923)
- Fools Highway (1924)
- Reckless Romance (1924)
- Hold Your Breath (1924)
- A Regular Fellow (1925)
- When the Wife's Away (1926)
- Now I'll Tell One (1927)
- The Tired Business Man (1927)
- Baby Brother (1927)
- Backstage (1927)
- Down the Stretch (1927)
- Alias the Deacon (1928)
- Playin' Hookey (1928)
- The Masked Angel (1928)
- The Bullet Mark (1928)
