= Don't Doubt Your Husband =

1924 silent film

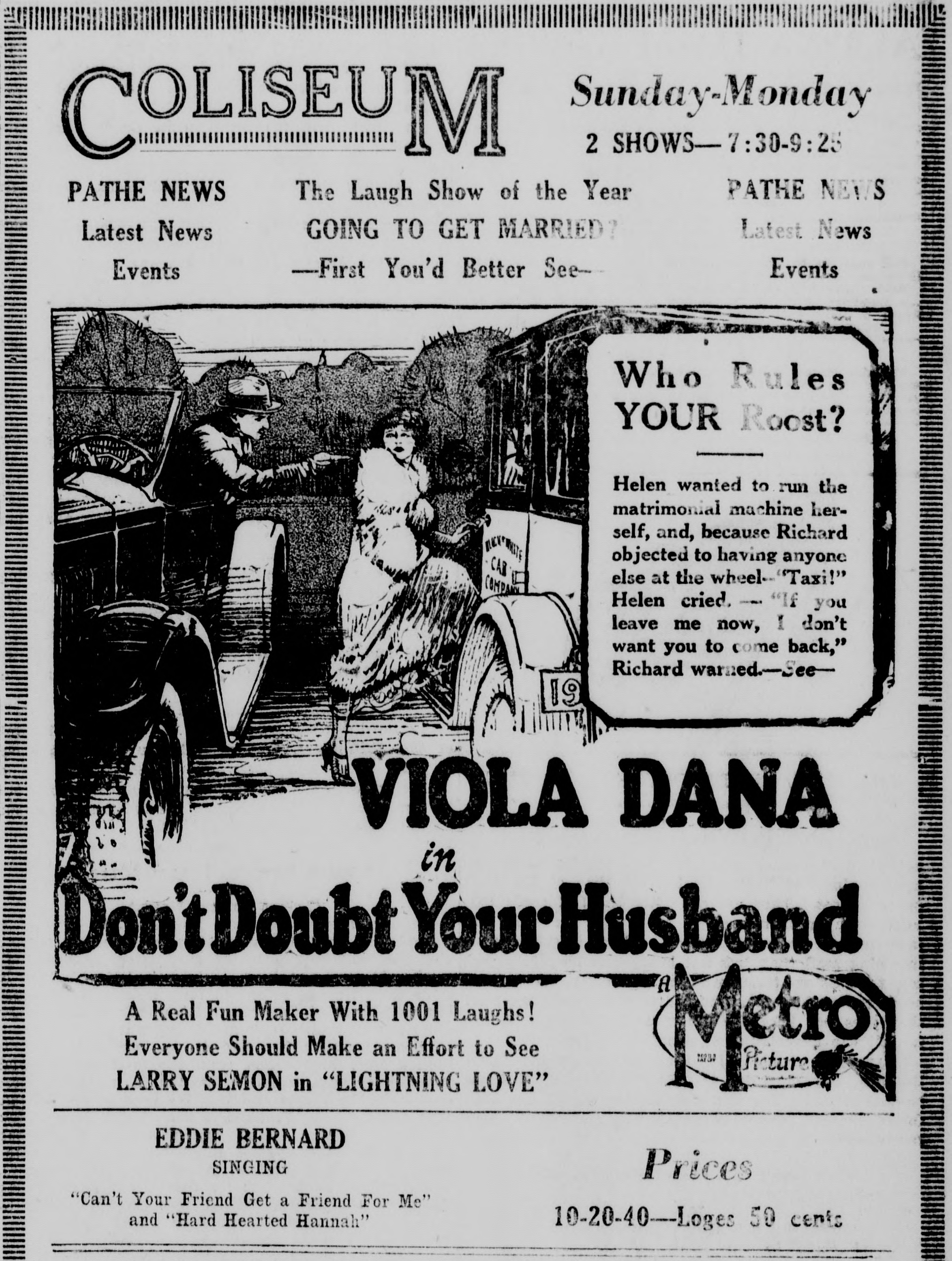
- Contemporary advertisement
- Directed by: Harry Beaumont
- Written by: Sada Cowan; Howard Higgin
- Starring: Viola Dana; Allan Forrest; Winifred Bryson
- Cinematography: John Arnold
- Production company: Metro Pictures
- Distributed by: Metro Pictures
- Release date: March 24, 1924
- Running time: 61 minutes
- Country: United States
- Languages: Silent; English intertitles

Don't Doubt Your Husband is a 1924 American silent comedy film directed by Harry Beaumont and starring Viola Dana, Allan Forrest and Winifred Bryson.

== Cast ==
- Viola Dana as Helen Blake
- Allan Forrest as Richard Blake
- Winifred Bryson as Alma Lane
- John Patrick as Reginald Trevor
- Willard Louis as Mr. Ruggles
- Adele Watson as Mrs. Ruggles
- Robert Dunbar as Mr. Clinton

== Bibliography ==
- James Robert Parish & Michael R. Pitts. Film directors: a guide to their American films. Scarecrow Press, 1974.
