= Anna Dodge =

American actress (1867–1945)

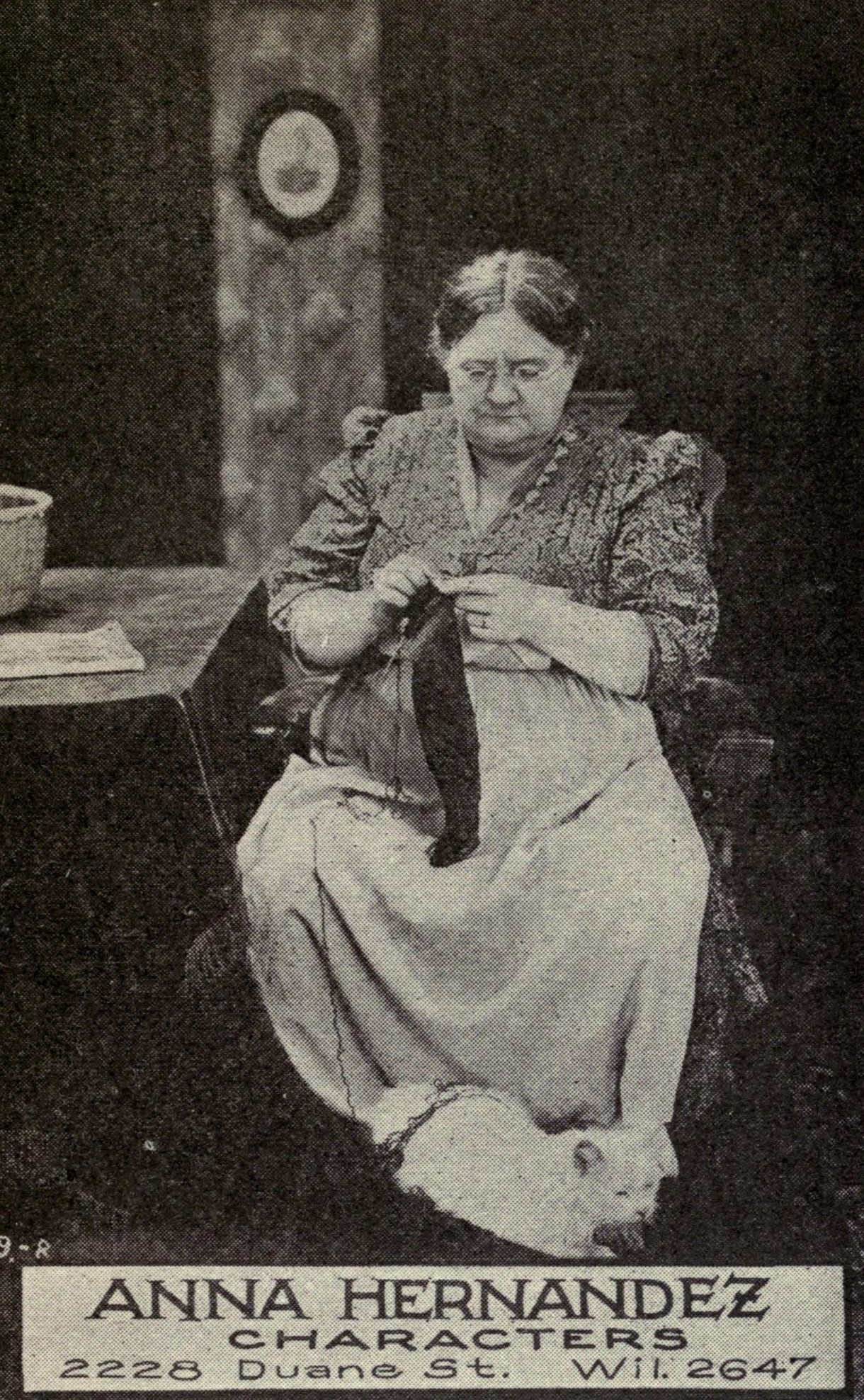
- Born: October 18, 1867; River Falls, Wisconsin, U.S.
- Died: May 4, 1945 (aged 77); Los Angeles, California, U.S.
- Other name: Anna Hernandez
- Occupation: Actress
- Years active: 1911 - 1932
- Spouse: George Hernandez

Anna Dodge (October 18, 1867 – May 4, 1945) was an American stage and silent film actress.

== Biography ==
Anna Bernice Dodge was born in River Falls, Wisconsin, the daughter of Sumner Downing Dodge and Eliza Ann Clementine Pratt Dodge. Her father owned a hardware store.

Dodge married fellow actor George Hernandez in 1899, and was frequently credited as Anna Hernandez. The couple were both members of the Elleford Company, and toured with the Ellefords in various comic stage roles. Her husband died in 1922, and she died in 1945, at the age of 77, in Los Angeles.

== Filmography ==
=== 1910s ===
- Making a Man of Him (1911)
- Out-Generaled (1911)
- Shipwrecked (1911)
- A Cup of Cold Water (1911)
- How Algy Captured a Wild Man (1911)
- The Blacksmith's Love (1911)
- The Regeneration of Apache Kid (1911)
- Their Only Son (1911)
- Slick's Romance (1911)
- The Old Captain (1911)
- It Happened in the West (1911)
- The Craven Heart (1911)
- The White Medicine Man (1911) .... Sitting Horse's Squaw
- A Sacrifice to Civilization (1911)
- Told in the Sierras (1911)
- Range Pals (1911) .... Mrs. Murdock, Steve's Mother
- Where There's a Will, There's a Way (1911)
- Stability vs. Nobility (1911)
- The Herders (1911) (as Mrs. Hernandez)
- The Still Alarm (1911)
- The Little Widow (1911)
- A Frontier Girl's Courage (1911)
- A Diamond in the Rough (1911)
- The Right Name, But the Wrong Man (1911)
- In the Days of Gold (1911) .... Mother Lopez
- Lieutenant Grey of the Confederacy (1911)
- Old Billy (1911)
- The Coquette (1911)
- Little Injin (1911)
- On Separate Paths (1911)
- The Girl and the Cowboy (1912)
- In Exile (1912)
- The Love of an Island Maid (1912)
- The New Woman and the Lion (1912)
- The End of the Romance (1912)
- Tenderfoot Bob's Regeneration (1912)
- The Junior Officer (1912)
- The 'Epidemic' in Paradise Gulch (1912)
- Bounder (1912)
- A Crucial Test (1912)
- The Shrinking Rawhide (1912)
- The Danites (1912)
- Disillusioned (1912) (as Anna Hernandez)
- A Mysterious Gallant (1912)
- Merely a Millionaire (1912)
- The Secret Wedding (1912)
- A Night Out (1912)
- Harbor Island (1912) .... Concha. Isabel's Duenna
- The Girl of the Mountains (1912) (as Anna Hernandez)
- The Vintage of Fate (1912)
- Shanghaied (1912)
- Kings of the Forest (1912)
- Saved by Fire (1912)
- The Fisherboy's Faith (1912)
- The Shuttle of Fate (1912)
- Euchred (1912)
- The Great Drought (1912)
- The Substitute Model (1912)
- The Indelible Stain (1912)
- Land Sharks vs. Sea Dogs (1912)
- A Messenger to Kearney (1912) .... Mother
- The Redemption of Railroad Jack (1913)
- The Old Clerk (1913)
- The Story of Lavinia (1913)
- The Tide of Destiny (1913)
- Unto the Third and Fourth Generation (1914)
- The Run on Percy (1915)
- The Circular Staircase (1915) .... Liddy
- The Rosary (1915) .... Bridget
- Mrs. Murphy's Cooks (1915) .... Mrs. Murphy
- The Timber Wolf (1916)
- Corporal Billy's Comeback (1916) (as Anna Hernandez)
- Hoodoo Ann (1916) (as Anna Hernandez) .... Sarah Higgins
- Framing Framers (1917) .... Mrs. O'Mears
- Until They Get Me (1917) .... Mrs. Draper
- Indiscreet Corinne (1917) .... Mrs. Cotter Brown
- When Liz Lets Loose (1917) (as Anna Hernandez)
- The Devil Dodger (1917) .... Mrs. Ricketts
- Money and Mystery (1917) (as Mrs. G. Hernandez)
- The Girl in the Garret (1917)
- A Midnight Mystery (1917) (as Anna Hernandez)
- The Smoldering Spark (1917)
- Never Too Old to Woo (1917)
- Polly Put the Kettle On (1917)
- Oh! Man! (1918) (as Anna Hernandez)
- The Last Rebel (1918) .... Landlady
- The Lonely Woman (1918) .... Mrs. Peevy
- Mr. Briggs Closes the House (1918)
- Nancy Comes Home (1918) .... Mrs. Jerry Ballou
- Heiress for a Day (1918) .... Mrs. Rockland
- The Shoes That Danced (1918) .... Mrs. Regan
- The Flames of Chance (1918) .... Mrs. Ribbits
- Betty Takes a Hand (1918) .... Gardner's Wife
- Without Honor (1918) .... Mrs. Dawson
- Leave It to Susan (1919) (as Anna Hernandez) .... Ma Burbridge
- Hearts Asleep (1919) .... Mother Hawkins
- Home Run Bill (1919) (as Anna Hernandez)

=== 1920s ===
- An Amateur Devil (1920) (as Anna Hernandez) .... Mrs. Brown
- Darling Mine (1920) (as Mrs. George Hernandez)
- The Jack-Knife Man (1920) (as Mrs. George Hernandez)
- The Gift Supreme (1920) .... Mrs. Wesson
- Seeing It Through (1920) (as Anna Hernandez) .... Mrs. Tweeney
- The Room of Death (1921) (as Anna Hernandez)
- Molly O' (1921) (as Anna Hernandez) .... Mrs. Tim O'Dair
- The Rowdy (1921) (as Anna Hernandez) .... Mrs. Purcell
- The Servant in the House (1921) (as Mrs. George Hernandez) .... Janitress
- The Pride of Palomar (1922) (as Mrs. George Hernandez) .... Caroline
- The Kentucky Derby (1922) (as Anna Hernandez) .... Mrs. Clancy
- The Extra Girl (1923) (as Anna Hernandez) .... Ma Graham
- The Town Scandal (1923) (as Anna Hernandez) .... Mrs. Crawford
- Black Oxfords (1924) (as Anna Hernandez)
- The Law Forbids (1924) (as Anna Hernandez) .... Martha Martin
- Ride for Your Life (1924) (as Mrs. George Hernandez) .... Mrs. Donnegan
- Name the Man (1924) (as Anna Hernandez) .... Mrs. Quayle
- The Big Palooka (1929) (as Anna Hernandez)

=== 1930s ===
- Fat Wives for Thin (1930) (as Anna Hernandez)
- Radio Kisses (1930) (as Anna Hernandez)
- He Trumped Her Ace (1930) (uncredited)
- Half Holiday (1931) (as Anna Hernandez)
- Speed (1931) (uncredited) (as Anna Hernandez)
- The Cannonball (1931) (as Anna Hernandez)
- Fainting Lover (1931) (as Anna Hernandez) .... Helen Roberts
- The Albany Branch (1931) (as Anna Hernandez)
- Ex-Sweeties (1931) (as Anna Hernandez)
- The Bride's Mistake (1931) (as Anna Hernandez)
- The Singing Plumber (1932) (as Anna Hernandez)
- Jimmy's New Yacht (1932) (as Anna Hernandez)
- Speed in the Gay Nineties (1932) (as Anna Hernandez)
- Lady! Please! (1932) (as Anna Hernandez)
