= Pleasure Mad =

1923 film by Reginald Barker

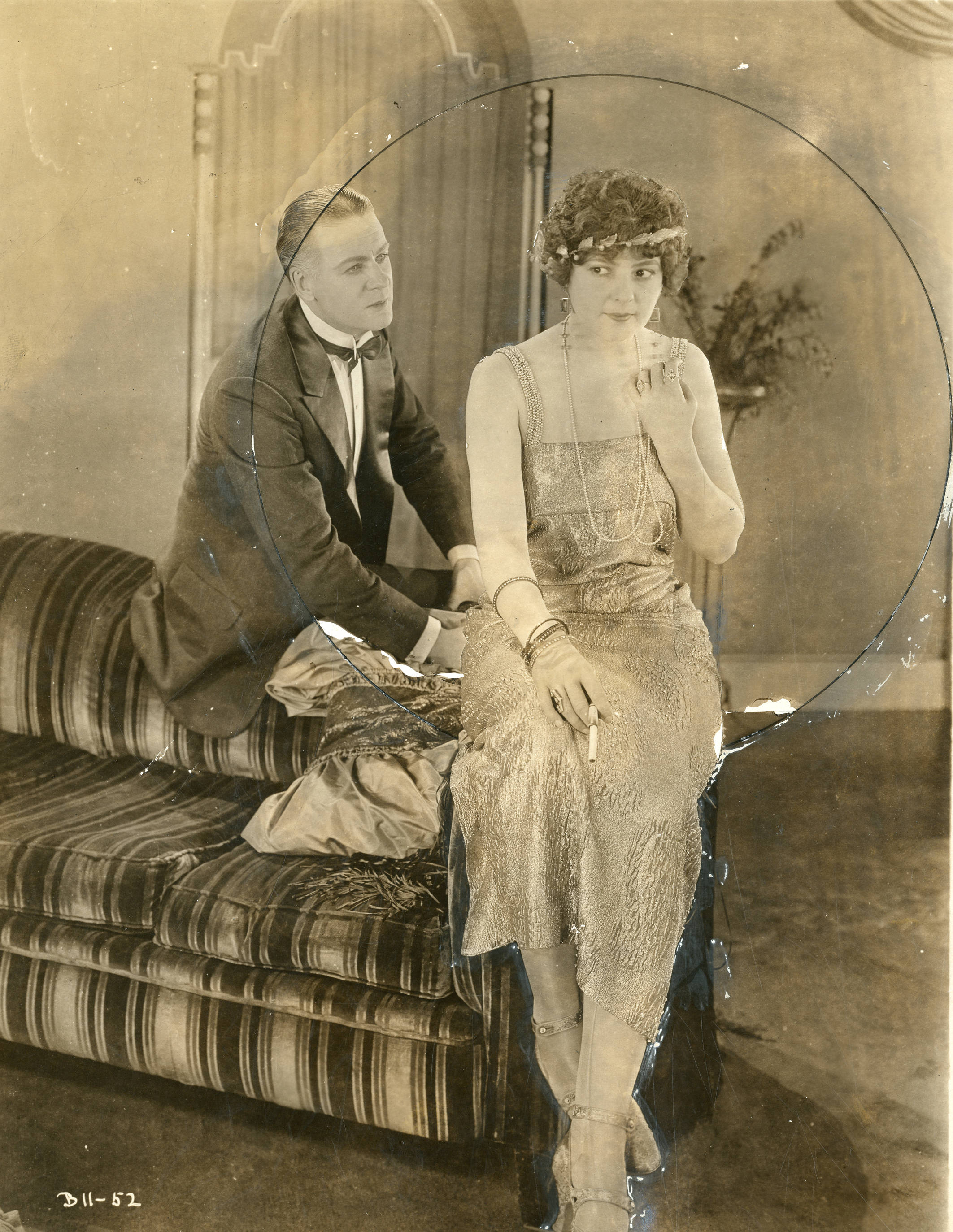
- Still with Huntley Gordon and Mary Alden
- Directed by: Reginald Barker
- Written by: A.P. Younger
- Based on: The Valley of Content by Blanche Upright
- Starring: Huntley Gordon; Mary Alden
- Cinematography: Norbert Brodine; Alvin Wyckoff
- Production company: Louis B. Mayer Productions
- Distributed by: Metro Pictures Corporation
- Release date: November 5, 1923
- Running time: 8 reels
- Country: United States
- Language: Silent (English intertitles)

Pleasure Mad is a 1923 American silent drama film directed by Reginald Barker and starring Huntley Gordon, Mary Alden, and Norma Shearer. The film was written by A.P. Younger based upon the novel The Valley of Content by Blanche Upright.

== Cast ==
- Huntley Gordon as Hugh Benton
- Mary Alden as Marjorie Benton
- Norma Shearer as Elinor Benton
- William Collier Jr. as Howard Benton
- Winifred Bryson as Geraldine de Lacy
- Ward Crane as David Templeton
- Frederick Truesdell as John Hammond
- Joan Standing as Hulda

== Bibliography ==
- Jack Jacobs & Myron Braum. The Films of Norma Shearer. A. S. Barnes, 1976.
