= Peer Gynt (1915 film) =

1915 American fantasy film directed by Oscar Apfel

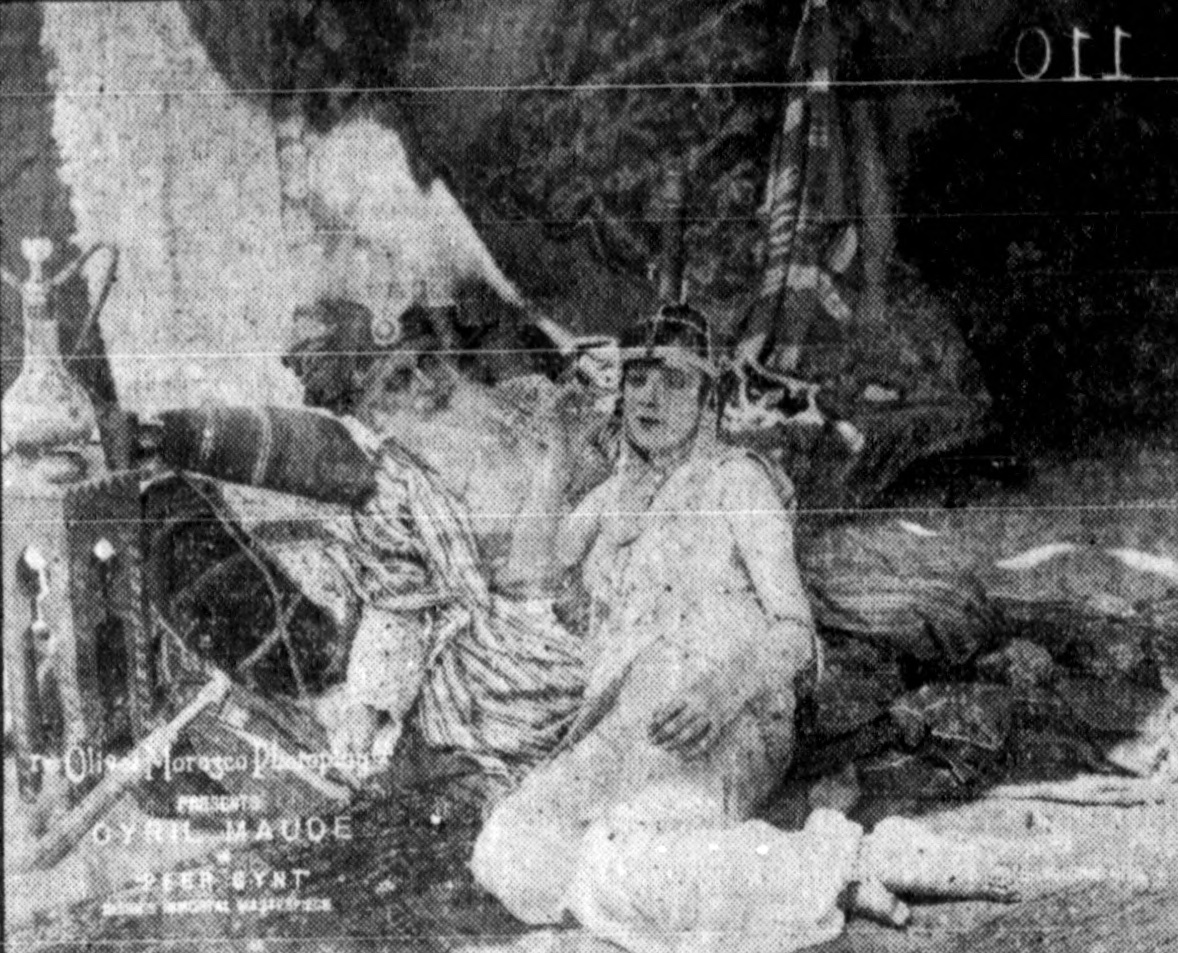
- Scene from the film
- Directed by: Oscar Apfel; Raoul Walsh
- Screenplay by: Oscar Apfel; Henrik Ibsen (play)
- Starring: Cyril Maude; Myrtle Stedman; Fanny Stockbridge; Mary Reubens; Mary Ruby; Winifred Bryson
- Production company: Oliver Morosco Photoplay Company
- Distributed by: Paramount Pictures
- Release date: September 16, 1915
- Running time: 50 minutes
- Country: United States
- Language: English

Peer Gynt is a surviving 1915 American fantasy silent film directed by Oscar Apfel and Raoul Walsh and adapted from the Henrik Ibsen play by Oscar Apfel. The film stars Cyril Maude, Myrtle Stedman, Fanny Stockbridge, Mary Reubens, Mary Ruby and Winifred Bryson. The film was released on September 16, 1915, by Paramount Pictures.

== Cast ==
- Cyril Maude as Peer Gynt
- Myrtle Stedman as Solveig
- Fanny Stockbridge as Ase
- Mary Reubens as Anitra
- Mary Ruby as Ingrid
- Winifred Bryson as Annabel Lee
- Evelyn Duncan as Virginia Thorne
- Kitty Stevens as Notanah
- Herbert Standing as St. Peter
- Charlie Ruggles as The Button Molder
- William Desmond as The Parson
- Juan de la Cruz as Robert
- Alma Rubens (*uncredited minor role)

== Preservation status ==
Prints are preserved at the Library of Congress and the BFI National Film and Television Archive.
