= Thundering Dawn =

1923 film by Harry Garson

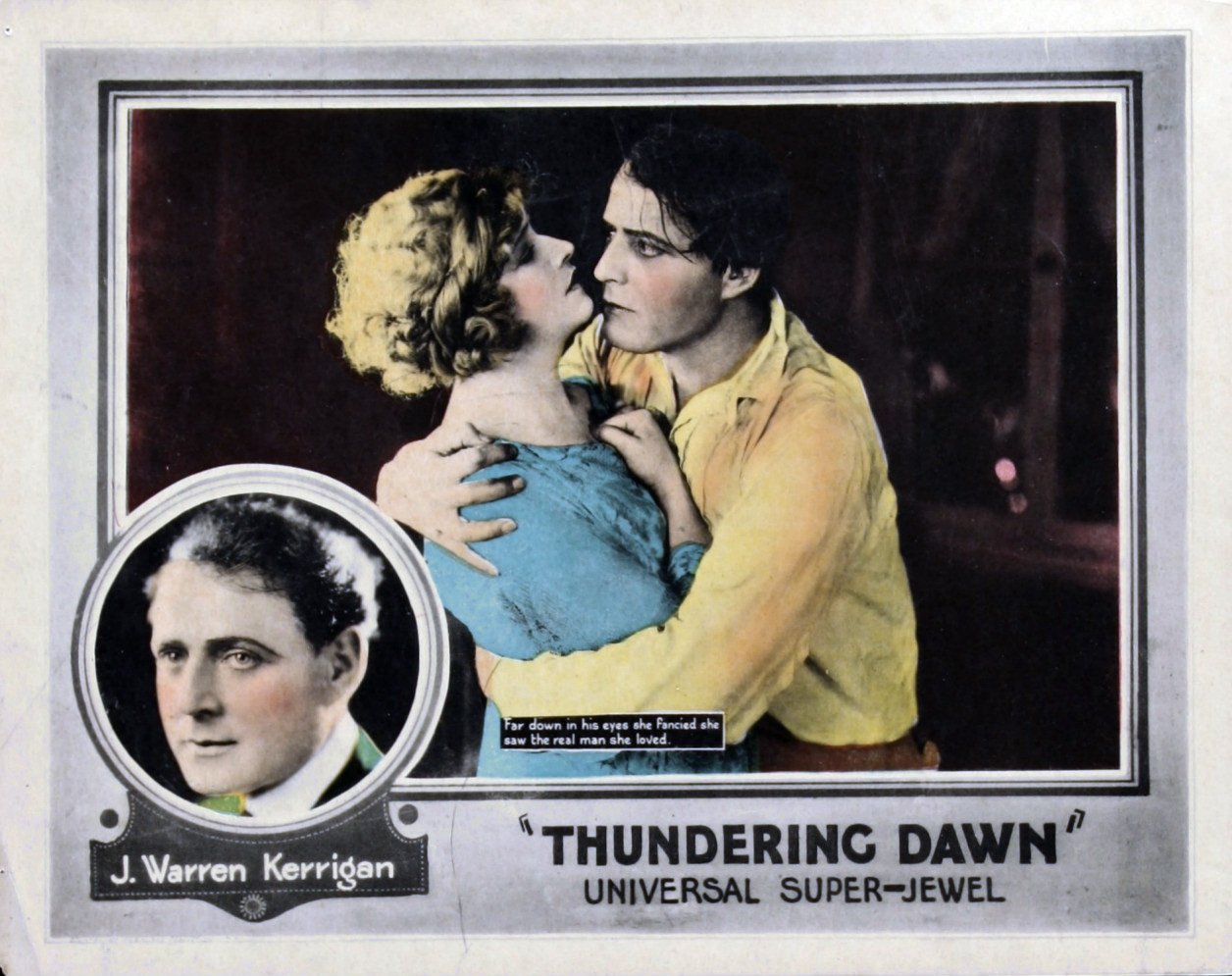
- Lobby card
- Directed by: Harry Garson
- Written by: Raymond L. Schrock; Lenore Coffee; John F. Goodrich
- Produced by: Harry Garson
- Starring: J. Warren Kerrigan; Anna Q. Nilsson; Thomas Santschi
- Cinematography: Charles Richardson; Louis Physioc; Elmer Ellsworth
- Distributed by: Universal Pictures
- Release date: November 5, 1923
- Running time: 7 reels
- Country: United States
- Language: Silent (English intertitles)

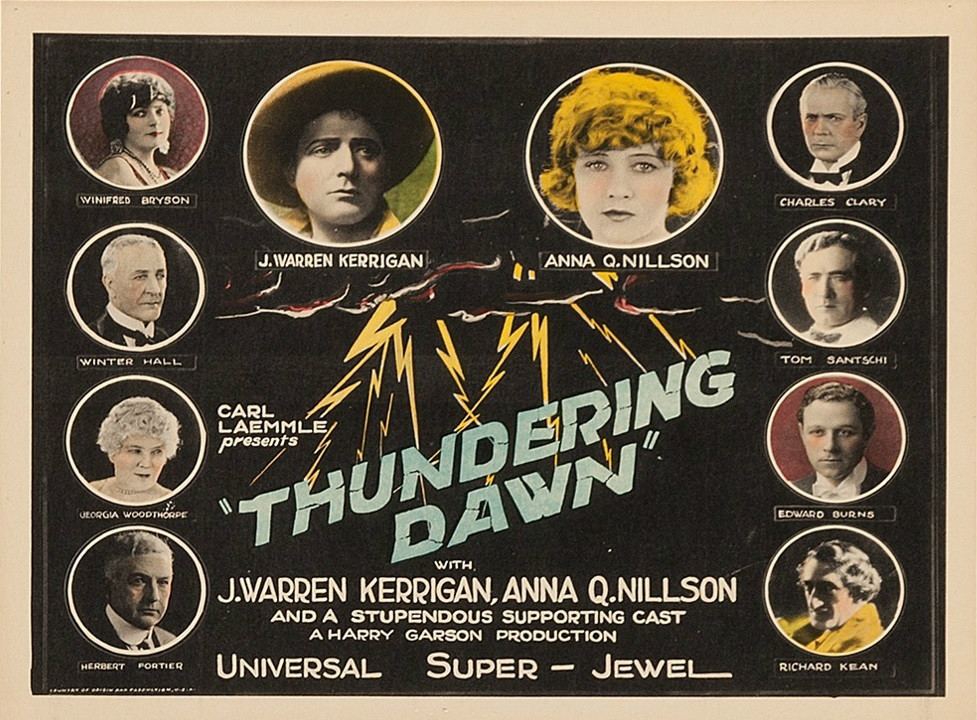
Thundering Dawn lobby card

Thundering Dawn is a lost 1923 American silent film directed and produced by Harry Garson. The story was originally written by John Blackwood and was adapted by Universal City scenario editor, Raymond L. Schrock. Lenore Coffee and John F. Goodrich are also credited for working on the screenplay. The film stars J. Warren Kerrigan, Anna Q. Nilsson, and Thomas Santschi. It was released on November 5, 1923. Before settling on Thundering Dawn, the film had two working titles; Havoc and The Bond of the Ring.

== Plot ==
A young man by the name of Jack Standish disappears on the eve of his marriage after the discovery of a financial scandal involving his father, John Standish. In order to protect his father from public disgrace, Jack suddenly flees Boston and thus takes the fall. The young Bostonian ends up fleeing to Java and inevitably succumbs to the lure of the tropics. Months later, his fiancé, Mary Rogers follows him to Java in hopes of bringing him home. Once Mary finds him, she is faced with the challenge of reviving him, both mentally and physically. Her task becomes more difficult when a native by the name of Lullaby Lou, and a Dutch trader by the name of Gordon Van Brock try to interfere with the couple. Mary and Jack are able to escape when a tropical storm hits and spawns a typhoon that destroys the coastal settlement.

== Cast ==
- J. Warren Kerrigan as Jack Standish
- Anna Q. Nilsson as Mary Rogers
- Winifred Bryson as Lullaby Lou
- Richard Kean as The Professor
- Thomas Santschi as Gordon Van Brock
- Edward Burns as Michael Carmichael
- Charles Clary as Morgan Sprott
- Herbert Fortier as The Doctor
- Winter Hall as John Standish
- Georgie Woodthorpe as Phoebe Standish
- Anna May Wong as The Honky Tonk Girl

== Production ==
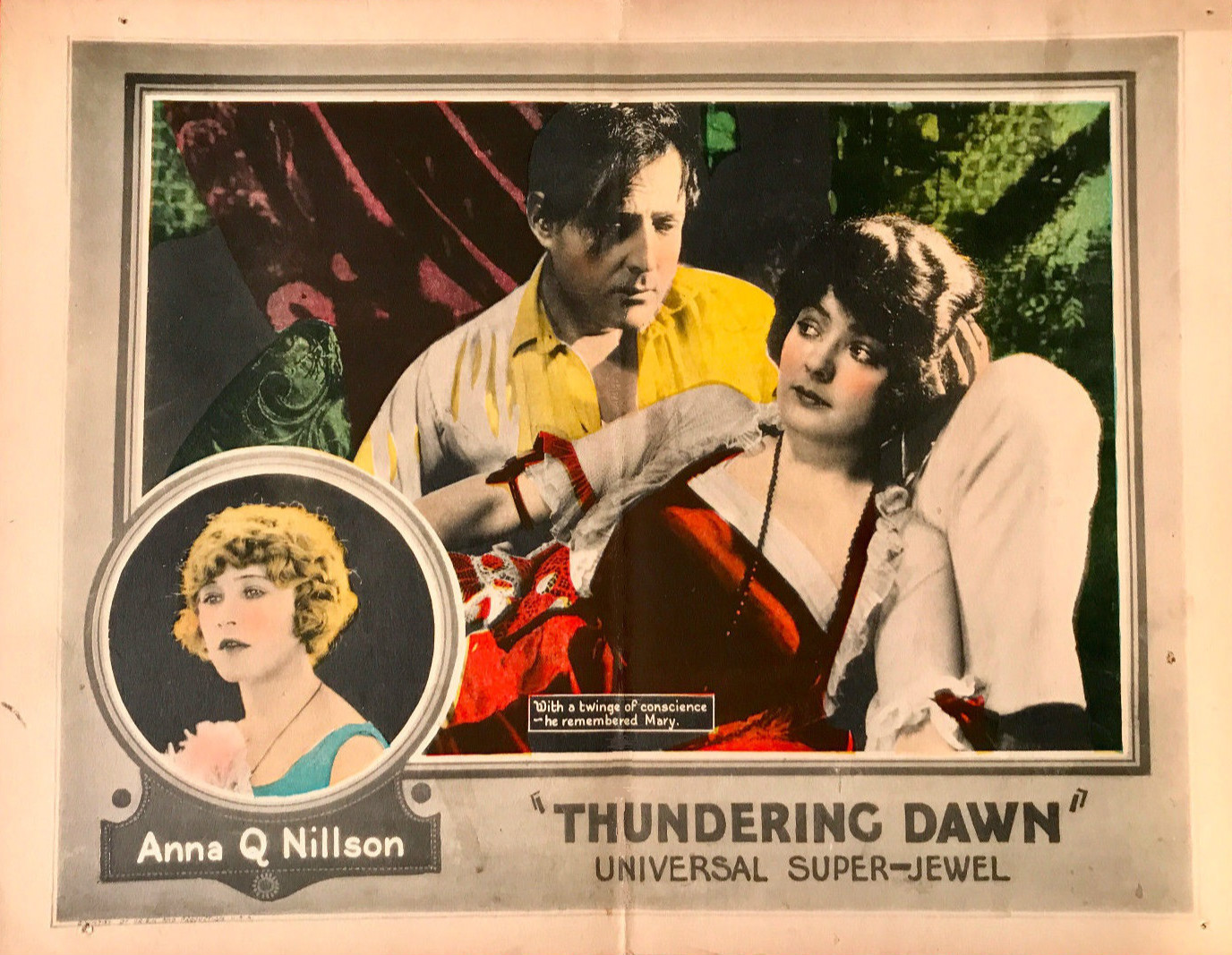
Lobby card

The typhoon scene at the end of the film was shot at the Garson Studio. Forty-six thousand gallons of water was used, along with twelve wind machines which swirled the water around and flooded the Garson Studio. Harry Garson had eight cameras capturing the scene. Lenore Ulrich, who was the star of a David Belasco film, visited the set on the day they filmed this particular scene and said, "It was the most wonderful thing I've ever seen, either on stage or in a studio."

== Preservation ==
While Thundering Dawn is presumed to be a lost film, a copy of its trailer is held by the Library of Congress.
