= Ride for Your Life =

1924 film directed by Edward Sedgwick

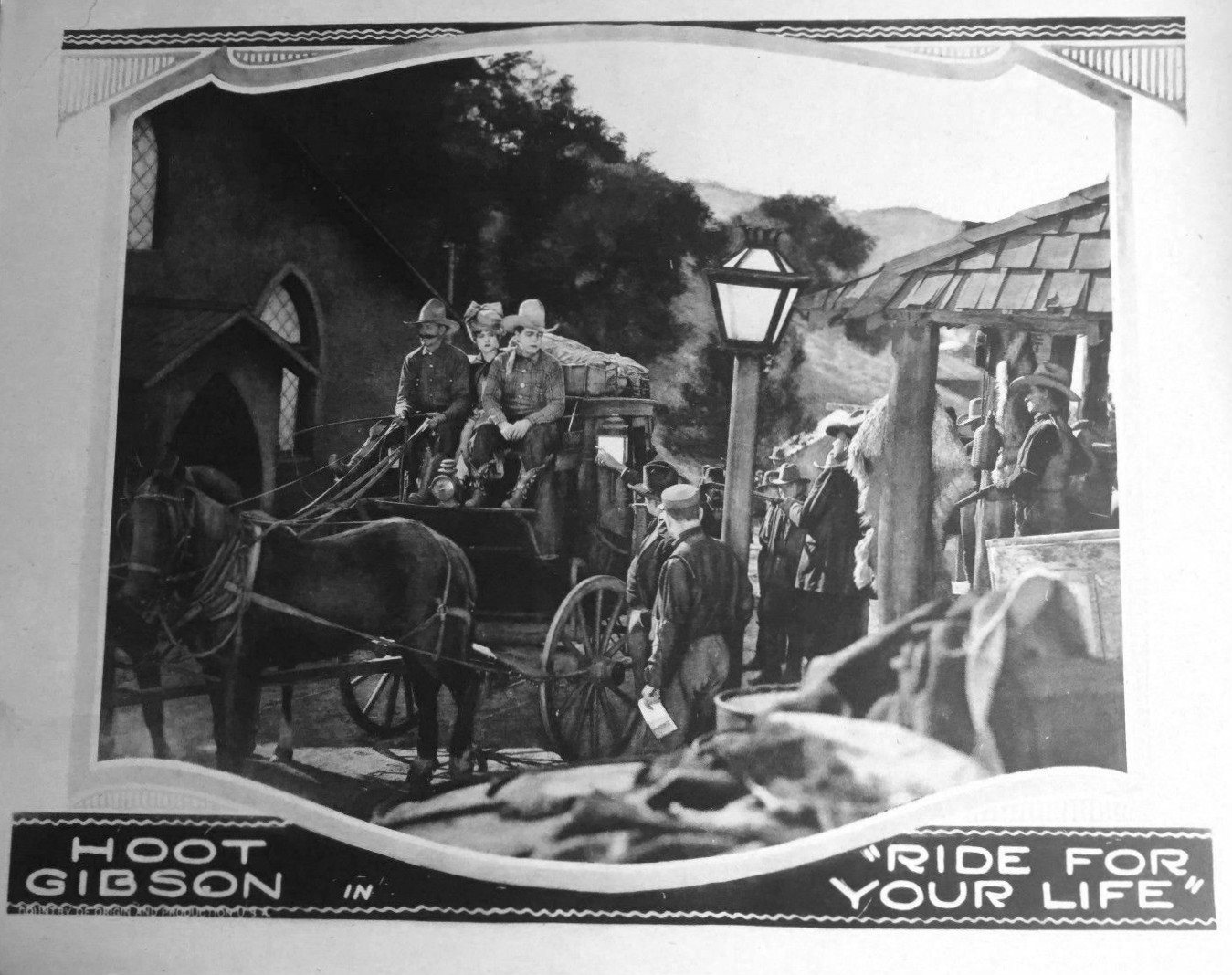
- Lobby card
- Directed by: Edward Sedgwick
- Written by: Johnston McCulley; Richard Schayer; Raymond L. Schrock
- Produced by: Carl Laemmle; Hoot Gibson
- Starring: Hoot Gibson
- Cinematography: Virgil Miller
- Distributed by: Universal Pictures
- Release date: February 25, 1924
- Running time: 60 minutes
- Country: United States
- Language: Silent (English intertitles)

Ride for Your Life is a 1924 American silent Western film directed by Edward Sedgwick and featuring Hoot Gibson.

== Plot ==
As described in a film magazine review, Bud Watkins is in love with Betsy Burke. However, she shows a preference for The Cocopah Kid, a reckless bandit. Gambler "Gentleman Jim" Slade cheats Bud out of his ranch. The Cocopah Kid dies suddenly. Bud, disguised as the bandit, has a variety of wild adventures. He defeats Slade's plot to obtain possession of the newly discovered gold diggings, rescues Betsy from Slade's clutches, and eventually wins Betsy's affection.

== Cast ==
- Hoot Gibson as Bud Watkins
- Laura La Plante as Betsy Burke
- Harry Todd as "Plug" Hanks
- Robert McKim as "Gentleman Jim" Slade
- Howard Truesdale as Dan Burke (credited as Howard Truesdell)
- Fred Humes as The Cocopah Kid
- Clark Comstock as Tim Murphy
- Anna Dodge as Mrs. Donnegan (credited as Mrs. George Hernandez)
- William Robert Daly as Dan Donnegan

== Preservation ==
With no prints of Ride for Your Life located in any film archives, it is a lost film.

== See also ==
- Hoot Gibson filmography
