= The Narrow Street =

1925 film

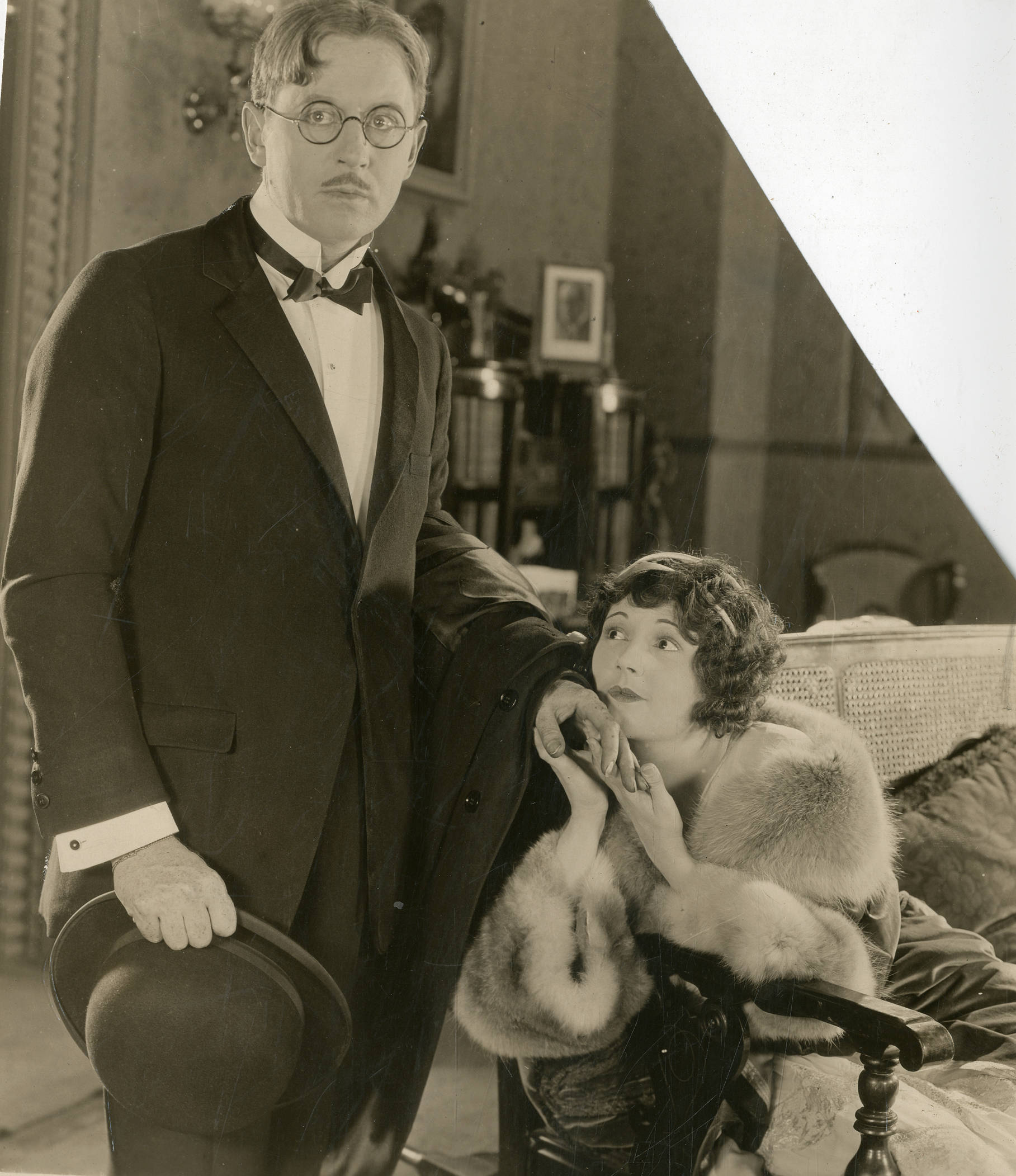
- Still with Matt Moore and Dorothy Devore
- Directed by: William Beaudine
- Written by: Julien Josephson
- Based on: The Narrow Street by Edwin Bateman Morris
- Starring: Matt Moore
- Cinematography: Ray June
- Production company: Warner Bros.
- Distributed by: Warner Bros.
- Release date: January 11, 1925
- Running time: 70 minutes
- Country: United States
- Language: Silent (English intertitles)
- Budget: $74,000
- Box office: $259,000

The Narrow Street is a 1925 American silent comedy film directed by William Beaudine and starring Matt Moore.

== Plot ==
As described in a review in a film magazine, Simon Haldane, the underdog in the office of the Faulkner Iron Works is efficient but absent-minded. He is the butt of the office staff jokes, so retiring that he is afraid of his own shadow, and intensely afraid of women. Doris, seeking to escape from detectives, hides in Simon's house and the next morning he is shocked to find her. A sudden chill causes him to call the Doctor for her, and this starts a fast rumor that Simon is married. All is up in the air when the office force calls in for a body. Doris has taken a liking to Simon, and breezy salesman Ray Wyeth takes a liking to her. An office shake-up results in Simon being made the manager. Returning home, the maid tells Simon that the young woman left with Ray. He later thoroughly trounces Ray and, after answering a telephone call directing him to go to a certain hotel, there he discovers that Doris is the daughter of his employer. He sheepishly starts to leave when she saves the situation.

== Cast ==
- Matt Moore as Simon Haldane
- Dorothy Devore as Doris
- David Butler as Ray Wyeth
- George C. Pearce as Edgar Deems
- Russell Simpson as Garvey
- Gertrude Short as Nell Mangan
- Joe Butterworth as Office boy
- Kate Toncray as Aunt Albina
- Tempe Pigott as Aunt Agnes
- Madame Sul-Te-Wan as Easter
- William Orlamond as Doctor

== Reception ==
According to Warner Bros. records, the film earned $219,000 in the United States and $40,000 in other markets. In 1930 it was remade as a talkie titled Wide Open starring Edward Everett Horton.

== Preservation ==
While no prints of The Narrow Street are located in any film archives, a private collector reportedly has an incomplete copy.
