= See My Lawyer (1921 film) =

1921 film

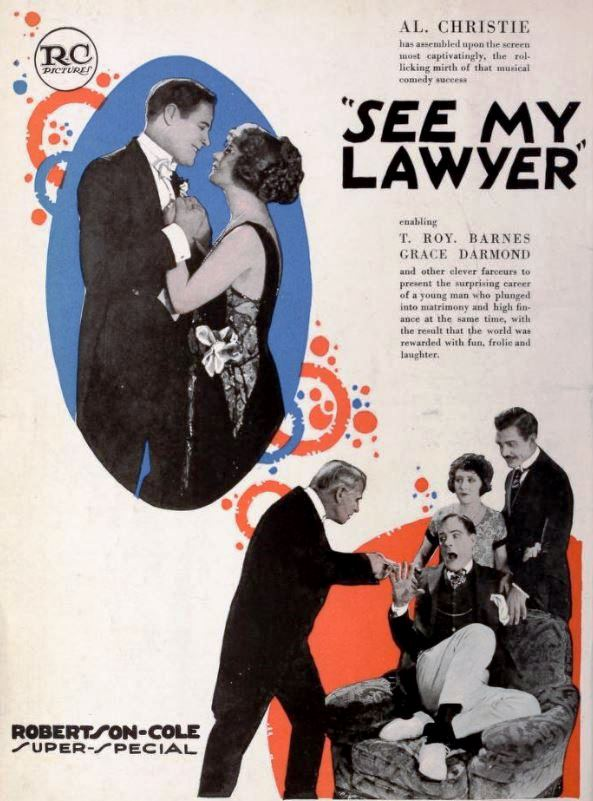
- Directed by: Al Christie
- Written by: Scott Darling
- Based on: See My Lawyer by Max Marcin
- Produced by: Al Christie
- Starring: T. Roy Barnes; Grace Darmond; Lloyd Whitlock
- Cinematography: Anton Nagy; Alex Phillips
- Production company: Robertson-Cole Pictures Corporation
- Distributed by: Robertson-Cole Pictures Corporation
- Release date: March 13, 1921
- Running time: 60 minutes
- Country: United States
- Languages: Silent; English intertitles

See My Lawyer is a 1921 American silent comedy film directed by Al Christie and starring T. Roy Barnes, Grace Darmond and Lloyd Whitlock. It is based on the 1915 play See My Lawyer by Max Marcin.

== Plot ==
An inventor fraudulently claims to have designed a machine that produces artificial rubber.

== Cast ==
- T. Roy Barnes as Robert Gardner
- Grace Darmond as Norma Joyce
- Lloyd Whitlock as Billy Noble
- Jean Acker as Betty Gardner
- Ogden Crane as T. Hamilton Brown
- Tom McGuire as Leonard D. Robinson
- J.P. Lockney as Otto Trueman
- Lincoln Plumer as Anson Morse
- Bert Woodruff as Dr. Drew
- Eugenie Forde as Aunt Kate

== Bibliography ==
- Munden, Kenneth White. The American Film Institute Catalog of Motion Pictures Produced in the United States, Part 1. University of California Press, 1997.
