= Law of the West (1932 film) =

1932 film

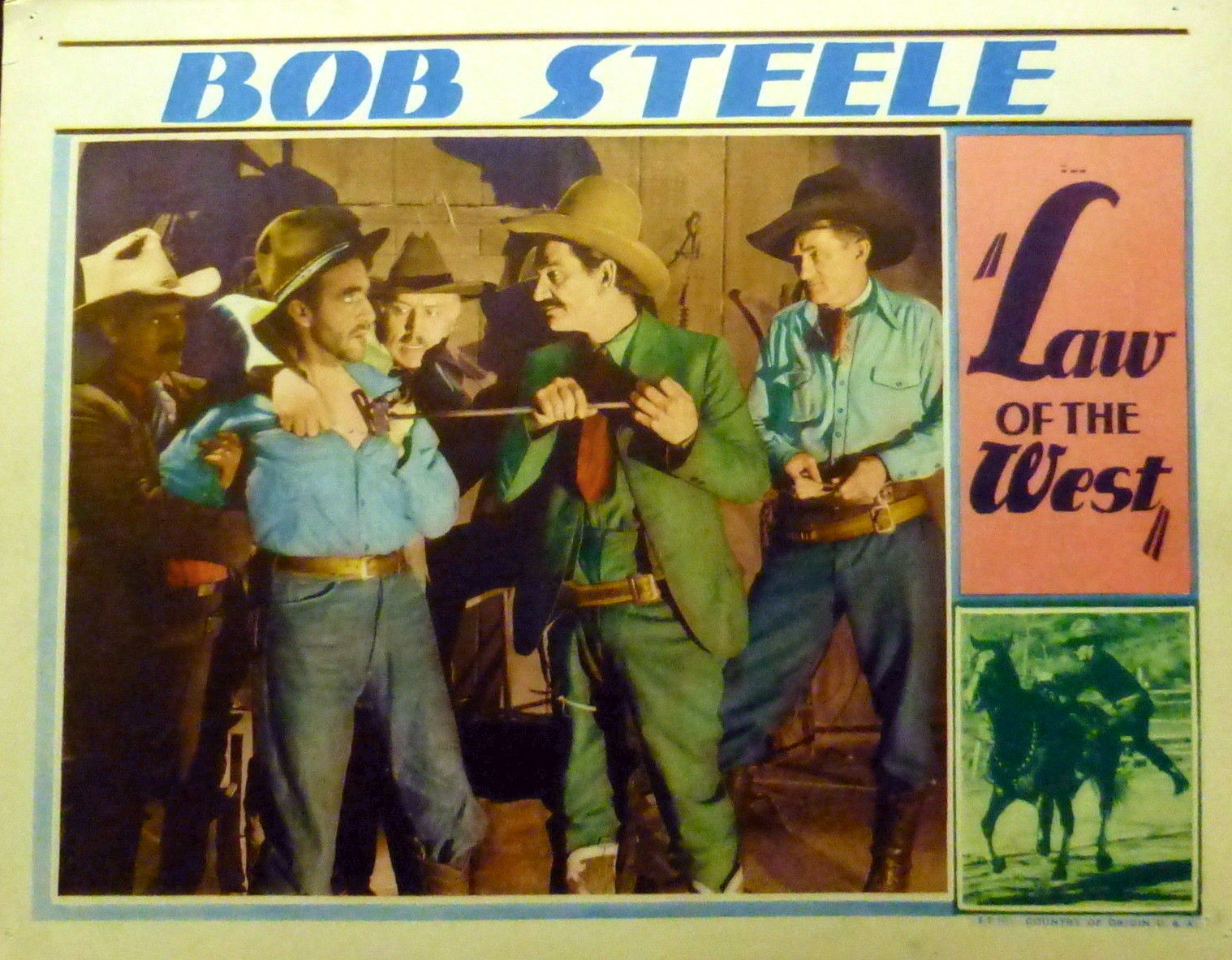
- Original Lobby card
- Directed by: Robert N. Bradbury
- Written by: Robert N. Bradbury (story and scenario)
- Produced by: Trem Carr (producer)
- Starring: See below
- Cinematography: Will Cline; Archie Stout
- Edited by: Charles J. Hunt
- Music by: Edward J. Kay
- Production company: Trem Carr Pictures
- Distributed by: Sono Art-World Wide Pictures
- Release date: March 20, 1932
- Running time: 58 minutes
- Country: United States
- Language: English

Law of the West is a 1932 American Pre-Code Western film directed by Robert N. Bradbury starring his son Bob Steele.

== Plot ==
Two cattle rustlers are caught in the act then branded as punishment and told if they are caught again they'll be killed. One of them, Lee Morgan, gets his revenge by kidnapping Bob, the infant son of the head cattleman, Dan Carruthers. Dan becomes a lawman in order to find his son.

Seventeen years later Bob Morgan/Carruthers is abused by Lee who he believes is his father who is pressuring him to join the other outlaws. Bob merely wants to go to California and send for his true love, Sally. Marshall Dan Carruthers rides into Outlaw Territory and the die is cast for destiny.

== Cast ==
- Bob Steele as Bob Carruthers, alias Bob Morgan
- Nancy Drexel as Sally Tracy
- Ed Brady as Lee Morgan
- Hank Bell as Marshal Dan Carruthers
- Charles West as "Dad" Tracy
- Earl Dwire as Henchman Butch
- Dick Dickinson as Henchman Buck Connors
- Rose Plumer as Mrs. Mary Carruthers

== Soundtrack ==
- "Ragtime Cowboy Joe" (Written by Grant Clarke, Maurice Abrahams and Lewis F. Muir)
