= The Awful Truth (1925 film) =

1925 film by Paul Powell

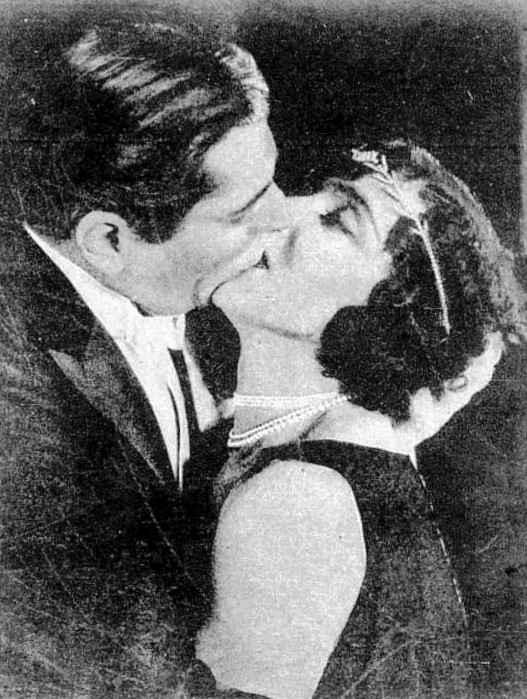
- Still showing the reconciliation
- Directed by: Paul Powell
- Written by: Elmer Rice
- Based on: The Awful Truth; 1922 play by Arthur Richman
- Produced by: Peninsula Studios; Elmer Harris
- Starring: Agnes Ayres; Warner Baxter
- Cinematography: Joseph A. DuBray
- Distributed by: Producers Distributing Corporation
- Release date: April 6, 1925
- Running time: 6 reels; 5,917
- Country: United States
- Language: Silent (English intertitles)

The Awful Truth is a 1925 American silent drama film directed by Paul Powell and released by the Producers Distributing Corporation. It is based on a 1922 play, The Awful Truth, by Arthur Richman. Agnes Ayres stars in this silent film version of the play. It was remade in 1937 as the talkie The Awful Truth.

== Plot ==
As described in a film magazine review, Lucy suspects her husband Norman of indiscretions of which he is not guilty and secures a divorce. However, she knows that Norman loves her and she loves him. One night he finds his bride on the fire escape in her night clothes with a wealthy old bachelor who is known to be infatuated with Lucy. He takes the scene as a shock, not waiting to learn the truth that she had taken refuge on the fire escape due to a fire. Lucy, unhappy, has been asked to marry Danny, a callow youth with a fortune. She becomes engaged to him, but his curious aunt determines to air the scandal surrounding the divorcee. Lucy thus must make it appear that nothing stands between her and Norman so that the aunt will not believe there was a scandal. She asks Norman to come to the winter resort where they are spending the months, and he comes out of curtesy. To carry out the plan they join as a team on the toboggan run. The toboggan upsets, sending both into the snow wrapped in each other's arms. The warm embrace shows Norman "the awful truth," that both had been faithful until the last in their marriage.

== Cast ==
- Agnes Ayres as Lucy Satterlee
- Warner Baxter as Norman Satterlee
- Winifred Bryson as Josephine Trent
- Phillips Smalley as Rufus Kempster
- Carrie Clark Ward as Mrs. Julia Leeson
- Raymond Lowney as Danny Leeson
- William Worthington as Jonathan Sims

== Preservation ==
A print of The Awful Truth survives in the UCLA Film and Television Archive.
