= The Millionaire Pirate =

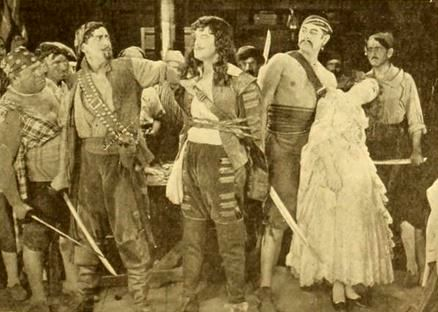
- Directed by: Rupert Julian
- Written by: Emil Nyitray; Herbert Hall Winslow; Waldemar Young
- Starring: Monroe Salisbury; Ruth Clifford; Lillian Langdon
- Production company: Universal Pictures
- Distributed by: Universal Pictures
- Release date: February 10, 1919
- Running time: 50 minutes
- Country: United States
- Languages: Silent; English intertitles

The Millionaire Pirate is a 1919 American silent fantasy adventure film directed by Rupert Julian and starring Monroe Salisbury, Ruth Clifford and Lillian Langdon.

== Cast ==
- Monroe Salisbury as Jean Lafitte
- Ruth Clifford as The Girl
- Lillian Langdon as Her Mother
- Harry Holden as Her Father
- Jack Mower as Her Sweetheart
- Clyde Fillmore as Robert Spurr

== Bibliography ==
- Robert B. Connelly. The Silents: Silent Feature Films, 1910-36, Volume 40, Issue 2. December Press, 1998.
