= Inside the Law =

1942 film by Hamilton MacFadden

- Film Poster
- Directed by: Hamilton MacFadden
- Written by: Jack Natteford (writer)
- Produced by: Dixon R. Harwin (producer)
- Starring: See below
- Cinematography: Arthur Martinelli
- Edited by: Carl Pierson
- Music by: David Chudnow (uncredited)
- Distributed by: Producers Releasing Corporation
- Release date: 1942
- Running time: 62 minutes
- Country: United States
- Language: English

Inside the Law is a 1942 American film directed by Hamilton MacFadden. It is also known as Rogues in Clover.

== Cast ==
- Wallace Ford as Billy
- Frank Sully as Jim Burke
- Harry Holman as Judge Mortimer Gibbs
- Luana Walters as Dora Mason
- Lafe McKee as Pop Cobb
- Barton Hepburn as Paul Kane
- Danny Duncan as Peter Clifford
- Earle Hodgins as Police Chief
- Rose Plumer as Mom Cobb
- Robert Frazer as Bank Official
