= Reckless Romance =

1924 film directed by Scott Sidney

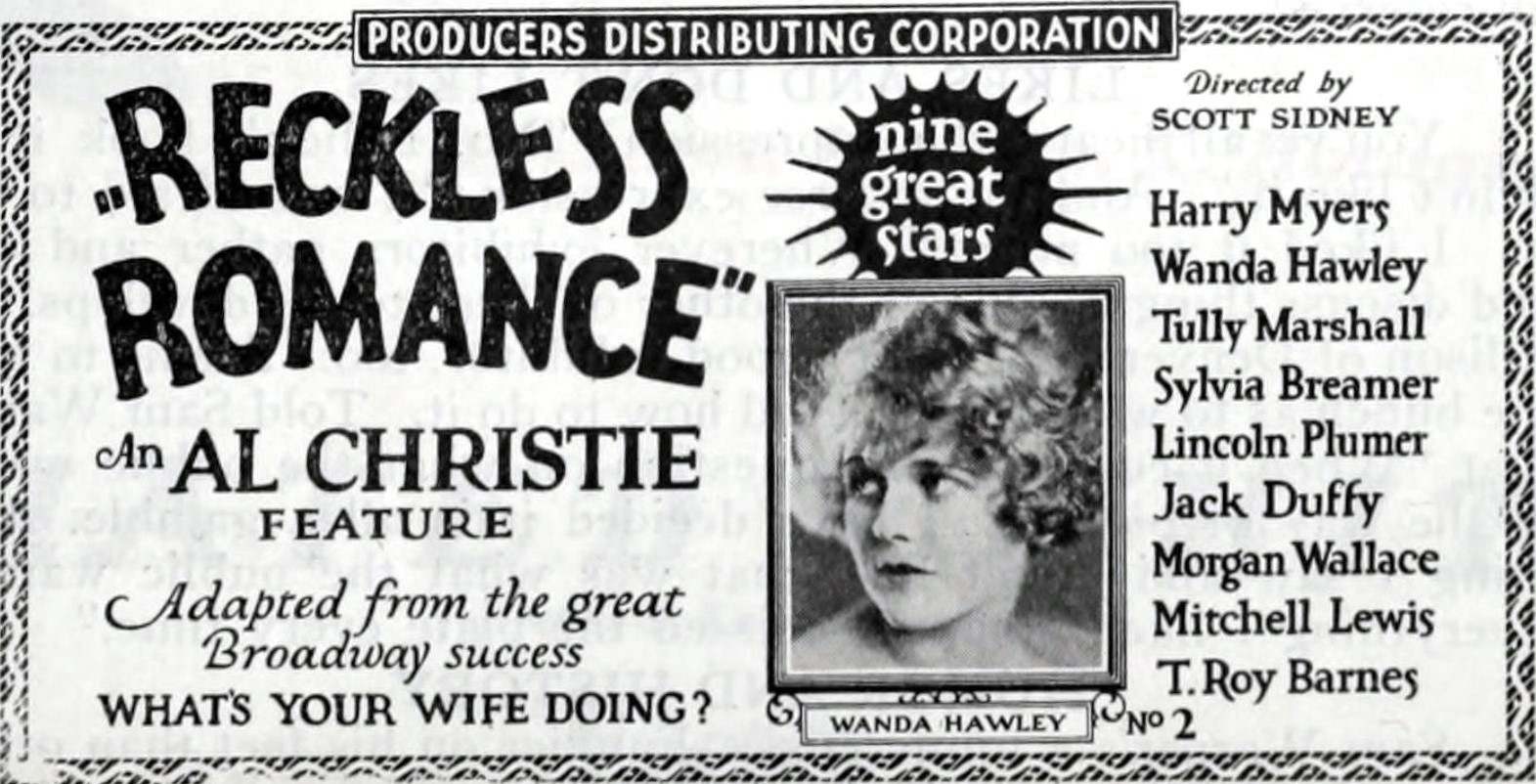
- Advertisement
- Directed by: Scott Sidney
- Written by: Joseph Farnham; F. McGrew Willis; Walter Woods
- Based on: What's Your Wife Doing by Herbert Hall Winslow and Emil Nyitray
- Produced by: Al Christie
- Starring: T. Roy Barnes; Harry Myers; Wanda Hawley
- Cinematography: Paul Garnett; Gus Peterson
- Production company: Christie Film Company
- Distributed by: Producers Distributing Corporation
- Release date: November 9, 1924
- Running time: 6 reels
- Country: United States
- Language: Silent (English intertitles)

Reckless Romance is a 1924 American silent comedy film directed by Scott Sidney and starring T. Roy Barnes, Harry Myers, and Wanda Hawley.

== Plot ==
As described in a review in a film magazine, Jerry Warner (Barnes) and Edith Somers (Breamer) are in love but Judge Somers (Marshall) will not allow them to marry because Jerry shows no signs of being a business man. Jerry's uncle sends him ten thousand dollars to set him up in business, and Judge Somers tells him if he has that money at the end of six months he can marry Edith. Jerry invests half of it in oil stock which Judge Somers says is worthless.

Chris (Myers) and Beatrice Skinner (Hawley), just married, receive word from Chris’ grandfather that he will stop the allowance because he does not like the girl. They decide to get a divorce and remarry after Chris has Grandpa's money.

For ten thousand dollars, Jerry poses as the co-respondent and they frame a scene for Grandpa to see. But their plans go awry. Chester becomes jealous and says he will get a real divorce and Edith catches them in a compromising position.

It all turns out all right with Grandpa approving of Beatrice, Jerry explaining to Beatrice, and the oil stock proving to be valuable.

== Cast ==
- T. Roy Barnes as Jerry Warner
- Harry Myers as Christopher Skinner
- Wanda Hawley as Beatrice Skinner
- Sylvia Breamer as Edith Somers
- Tully Marshall as Judge Somers
- Jack Duffy as Grandpa
- Lincoln Plumer as Uncle Bellamy
- Morgan Wallace as Harold Shrewsbury
- George B. French as Lyman Webster

== Preservation ==
A complete copy of Reckless Romance is located at the Eye Filmmuseum in Amsterdam.

== Bibliography ==
- Darby, William. Masters of Lens and Light: A Checklist of Major Cinematographers and Their Feature Films. Scarecrow Press, 1991. ISBN 0-8108-2454-X
