= The Great Night (film) =

1922 film

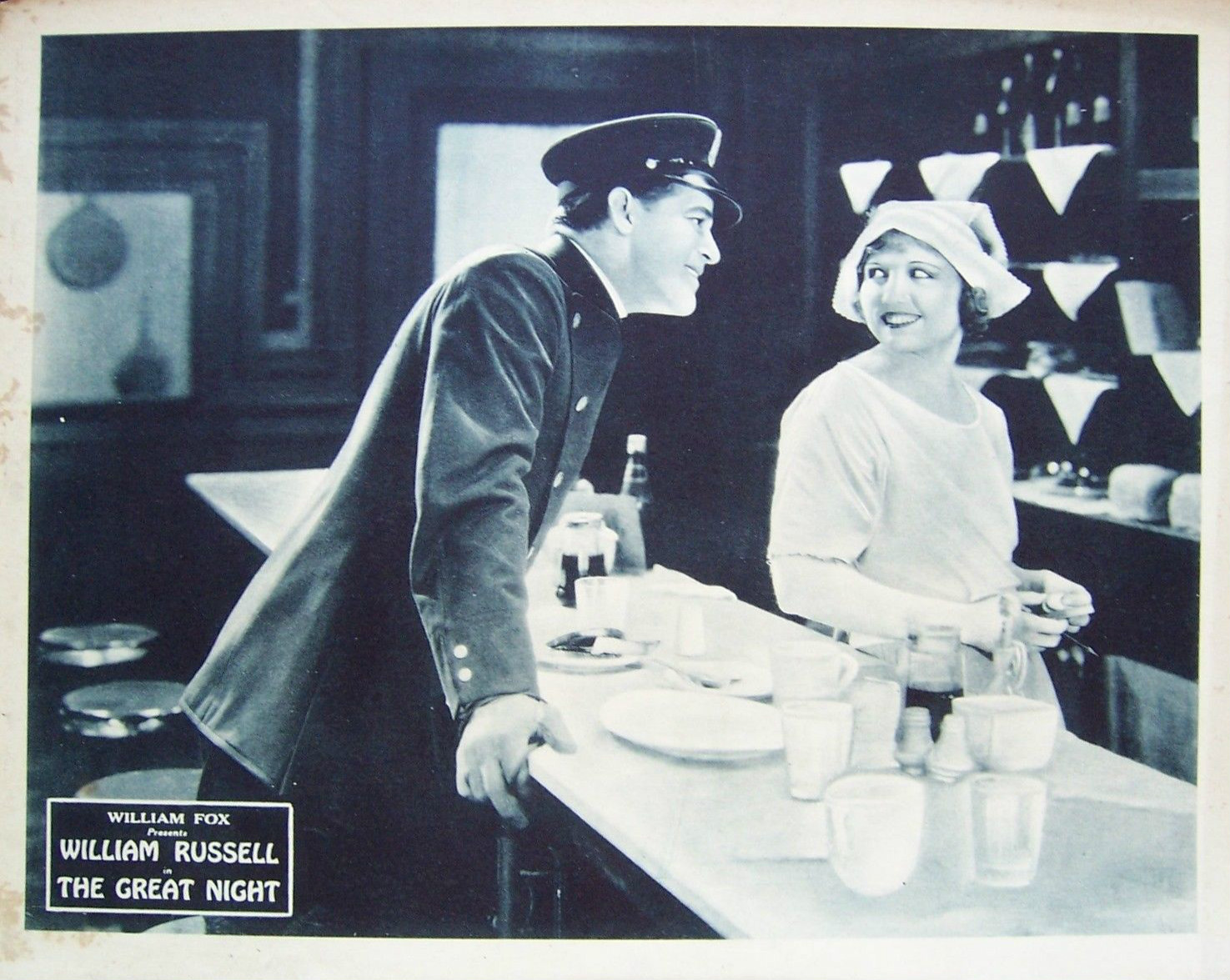
- Lobby card
- Directed by: Howard M. Mitchell
- Screenplay by: Joseph F. Poland
- Starring: William Russell; Eva Novak; Winifred Bryson; Henry A. Barrows; Wade Boteler; Harry Lonsdale
- Cinematography: David Abel
- Production company: Fox Film Corporation
- Distributed by: Fox Film Corporation
- Release date: December 3, 1922
- Running time: 50 minutes
- Country: United States
- Language: Silent (English intertitles)

The Great Night is a lost 1922 American comedy film directed by Howard M. Mitchell and written by Joseph F. Poland. The film stars William Russell, Eva Novak, Winifred Bryson, Henry A. Barrows, Wade Boteler, and Harry Lonsdale. The film was released on December 3, 1922, by Fox Film Corporation.

== Cast ==
- William Russell as Larry Gilmore
- Eva Novak as Mollie Martin
- Winifred Bryson as Papita Gonzales
- Henry A. Barrows as Robert Gilmore
- Wade Boteler as Jack Denton
- Harry Lonsdale as Simpkins
- Earl Metcalfe as Green
