= Herbert Hall Winslow =

American dramatist

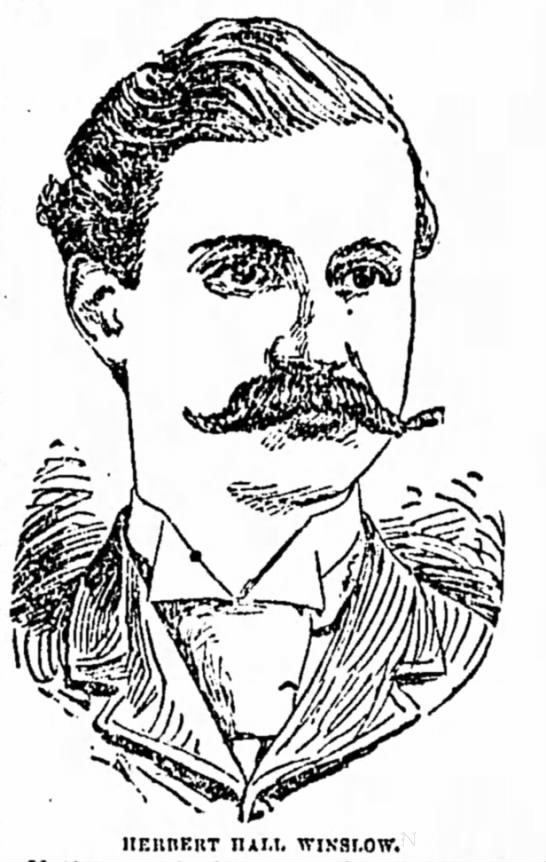
- 1893 drawing of Winslow
- Born: November 23, 1863; Keokuk, Iowa, United States
- Died: June 1, 1930 (aged 66); Hastings-on-Hudson, New York; United States
- Occupations: Writer, Actor
- Years active: 1914–1924 (film)
- Spouse(s): Daisy Edna Rowel (married 1890, divorced 1894); Anna Grace Lippincott (married 1894)
- Children: 2

Herbert Hall Winslow (November 23, 1863 – June 1, 1930) was an American stage actor and playwright. He acted in and directed the 1914 silent film Manon Lescaut.

Winslow was born in Keokuk, Iowa.

More than 100 plays that Winslow wrote were produced, most of which were performed by stock theater companies and touring troupes. His works that were produced on Broadway included He Loved the Ladies (1927), Mercenary Mary (1925), What's Your Wife Doing? (1923), Broken Branches (1922), Just Around the Corner (1919), The Girl From Broadway (1907), The Spellbinder (1904), The Vinegar Buyer (1903), and The Great Northwest (1896).

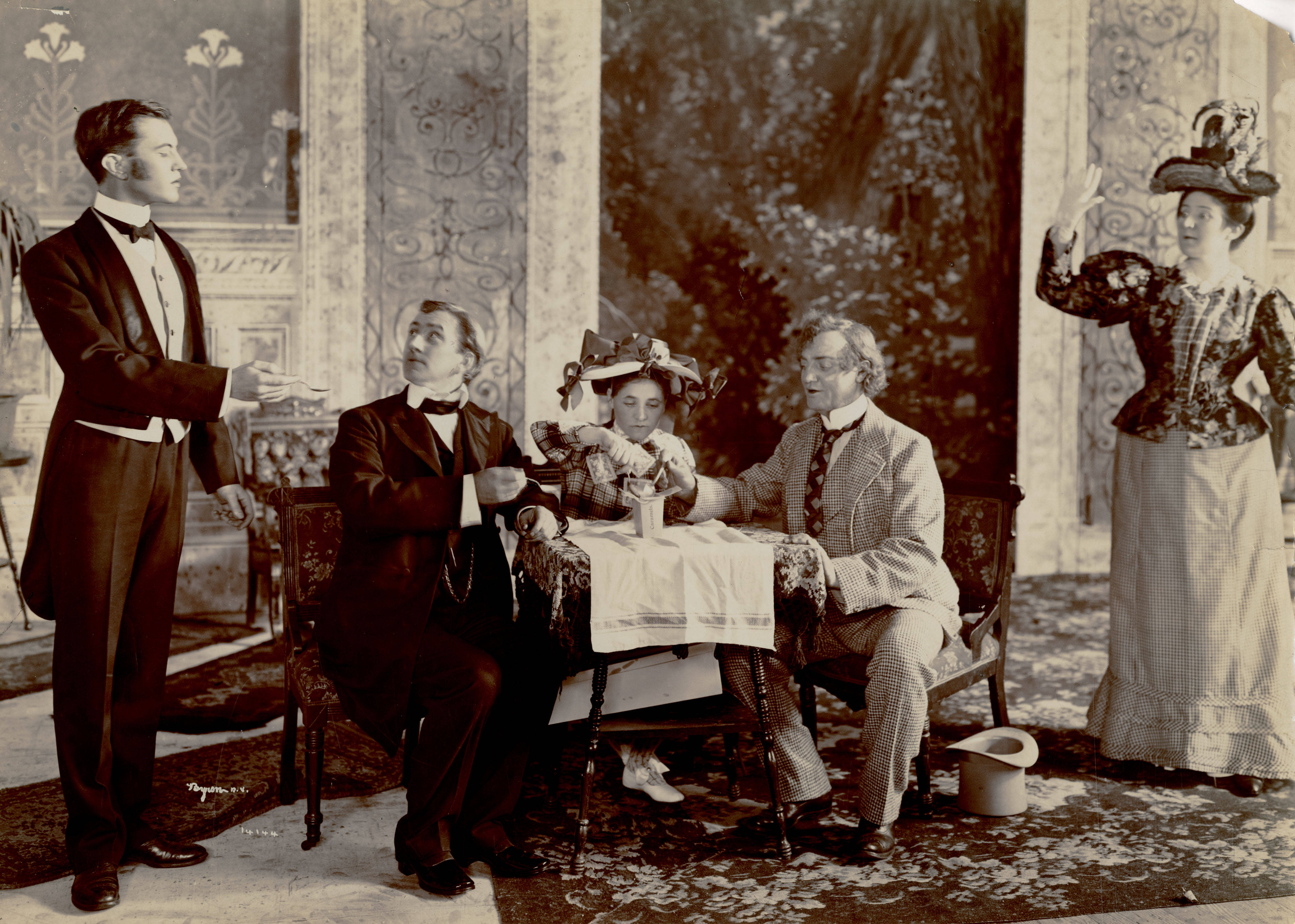
A scene from "The Vinegar Buyer, 1903"

Winslow's divorce from his first wife, Daisy Edna Rowel, became a source of national attention in 1893. He sought a divorce claiming abandonment, stating that Rowel had a violent temper which had led her to attack him with a pair of scissors at least once. She denied the allegations, tearfully taking the stand. Their two-year-old son, Herbert Hall Winslow, Jr was present for the proceedings. The court ruled in Rowel's favor, denying the divorce. 18 months later, Judge E.G. Smith set aside the verdict and granted an "absolute divorce" in July 1894. Daisy later married veterinarian Dr. Harry Stillwell Field in 1907.

Five months after his divorce was granted, Winslow married internationally performing soprano opera singer Anna "Annie" Grace Lippincott in December 1894. Lippincott was the daughter of international writer, abolitionist, and women's suffragist Sara Jane Lippincott, better known as "Grace Greenwood." Greenwood came to live with them in 1900 when she retired as a political correspondent for the New York Times.

Anna and Winslow remained married the rest of his life. They had one son together, Cpl Herbert Lippincott Devotion Winslow, who died serving in World War I in 1918.

On June 1, 1930, Winslow died at Hastings-on-Hudson, New York at age 64.

== Selected filmography ==
- Manon Lescaut (1914)
- The Great Diamond Robbery (1914)
- The Siren's Song (1915)
- Sunday (1915)
- The Millionaire Pirate (1919)
- Reckless Romance (1924)

== Bibliography ==
- Paul Fryer, Olga Usova. Lina Cavalieri: The Life of Opera's Greatest Beauty, 1874-1944. McFarland, 2003.
