= T. Roy Barnes =

American actor (1880–1937)

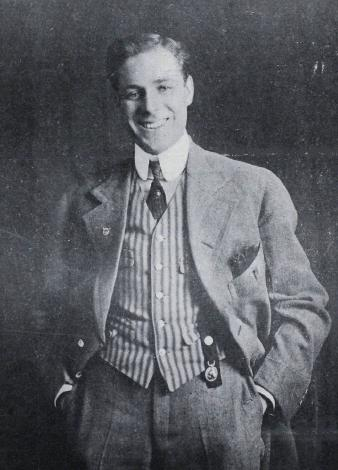
- Barnes on a 1910 cover of The Sphinx
- Born: Thomas Roy Barnes; August 11, 1880; Lincolnshire, England
- Died: March 30, 1937 (aged 56); Hollywood, California, U.S.
- Occupation: Actor
- Years active: ca. 1900 - 1935
- Spouse: Bessie Crawford (until his death)
- Children: 2

Thomas Roy Barnes (August 11, 1880 – March 30, 1937) was a British-American actor.

== Biography ==
Barnes appeared in over 50 films between 1920 and 1935, primarily in comedies. Although born in England, he lived in the United States from early childhood. He was married to stage actress Bessie Crawford until his death. They had two children.

Barnes started his show career in vaudeville where he appeared with his wife in an act billed as "Package of Smiles". He later turned to stage and film acting. During the 1920s, he often played "brash young go-getters" in supporting and leading roles. One of his best-known film roles to modern audiences is Buster Keaton's business partner Billy Meekin in Seven Chances (1925). Barnes was also memorable in W. C. Fields' comedy It's a Gift (1934), portraying an inquisitive Insurance Salesman who searches a man by the name of "Carl La Fong". He retired from movies in 1935 and died two years later.

== Partial filmography ==
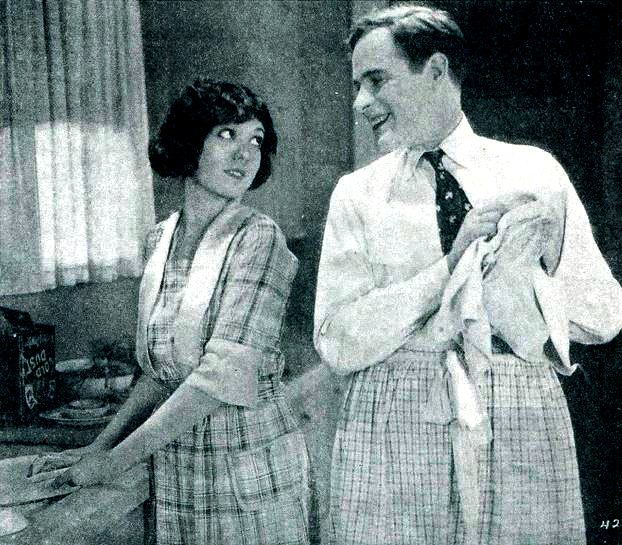
Barnes and Lila Lee in Is Matrimony a Failure? (1922)

- So Long Letty (1920)
- Scratch My Back (1920)
- Exit the Vamp (1921)
- Her Face Value (1921)
- See My Lawyer (1921)
- A Kiss in Time (1921)
- Is Matrimony a Failure? (1922)
- A Trip to Paramountown (1922)
- Too Much Wife (1922)
- Don't Get Personal (1922)
- The Old Homestead (1922)
- The Go-Getter (1923)
- Adam and Eva (1923)
- Souls for Sale (1923, as himself)
- The Great White Way (1924)
- Butterfly (1924)
- Reckless Romance (1924)
- The Crowded Hour (1925)
- Seven Chances (1925)
- Typhoon Love (1926)
- The Unknown Cavalier (1926)
- A Regular Scout (1926)
- Ladies of Leisure (1926)
- The Tender Hour (1927)
- Body and Soul (1927)
- Chicago (1927)
- The Gate Crasher (1928)
- Sally (1929)
- Dangerous Curves (1929)
- Caught Short (1930)
- Wide Open (1930)
- Aloha (1931)
- Women of All Nations (1931)
- Kansas City Princess (1934)
- It's a Gift (1934)
- Village Tale (1935)
- Doubting Thomas (1935)
