= Behind the Curtain (film) =

1924 film

- Directed by: Chester M. Franklin
- Written by: William J. Flynn; Emil Forst; Harvey Gates
- Starring: Lucille Ricksen; John Harron; Winifred Bryson
- Cinematography: Jackson Rose
- Production company: Universal Pictures
- Distributed by: Universal Pictures
- Release date: July 15, 1924
- Running time: 50 minutes
- Country: United States
- Language: Silent (English intertitles)

Behind the Curtain is a 1924 American silent mystery crime film directed by Chester M. Franklin and starring Lucille Ricksen, John Harron and Winifred Bryson. It was produced and distributed by Universal Pictures. It was based on a story by William J. Flynn, a former Director of the Bureau of Investigation. A print exists in the George Eastman Museum film archive.

== Synopsis ==
Hugh, the son of wealthy George Belmont, elopes with the sister of his father's mistress Laura. The furious George breaks off with Laura, believing she orchestrated the whole thing, and tries to buy off his new daughter-in-law Sylvia. When George is then found murdered, Laura is a natural suspect although Professor Gregorius, a fake spiritualist, is also in the frame.

== Cast ==
- Lucille Ricksen as Sylvia Bailey
- John Harron as Hugh Belmont
- Winifred Bryson as Laura Bailey
- Charles Clary as George Belmont
- Eric Mayne as Prof. Gregorius
- George Cooper as Slug Gorman
- Clarence Geldert as District Attorney
- Pat Harmon as Spike

== Bibliography ==
- Munden, Kenneth White. The American Film Institute Catalog of Motion Pictures Produced in the United States, Part 1. University of California Press, 1997.
- Soister, John T. Nicolella, Henry & Joyce, Steve . American Silent Horror, Science Fiction and Fantasy Feature Films, 1913-1929. McFarland, 2014.
