= Scratch My Back (film) =

1920 film by Sidney Olcott

Scratch my Back
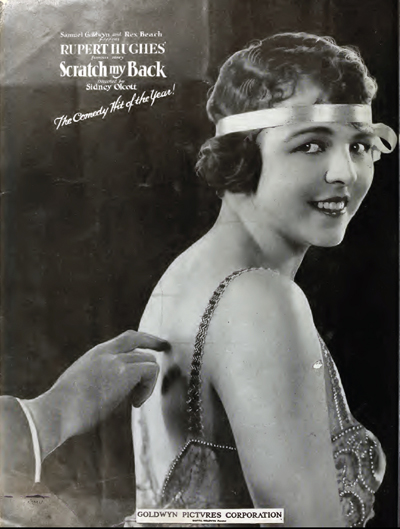
- Advertisement in 1920 issue of The Film Daily
- Directed by: Sidney Olcott
- Written by: Rupert Hughes; E.T. Lowe
- Story by: Rupert Hughes
- Produced by: Eminent Authors Pictures
- Starring: Helene Chadwick; T. Roy Barnes
- Cinematography: Steve Rounds
- Distributed by: Goldwyn Pictures
- Release date: June 12, 1920
- Running time: 6 reels
- Country: United States
- Language: Silent (English intertitles)

Scratch My Back is a 1920 American silent comedy film produced by Eminent Authors Pictures and distributed by Goldwyn Pictures. Adapted by Rupert Hughes from one of his story, the film was directed by Sidney Olcott with T. Roy Barnes and Helene Chadwick in the leading roles. It is not known whether the film currently survives.

This film is preserved in a copy prepared by Metro-Goldwyn-Mayer.

== Plot ==
As described in a film magazine, Val Romney (Barnes), a young society man who does about as he pleases, is at a society function when he has a predicament of having an itching back and being unable to get any relief. Meanwhile, Madeline (Chadwick) is in a French boarding school from which she runs away and goes to London and becomes a dancer. When she tires of that life she returns to her father, an American living in Paris. On her way home she meets a young American whom she later marries without telling him of her escapades in London. Later, they are a married couple living in the United States when, during one night at the opera, they are seated in front of Val. Madeline is annoyed by an itchy back and Val, remembering that he was once in this discomfort, impulsively leans forward and scratches her shoulder. She writes him a note of thanks and asks him to call on her. The next day she tells him of her London experiences and says her former dance partner is trying to blackmail her. She dares not tell her husband and asks Val for help. She and Val plot to outwit the blackmailer. They succeed, but arouse the jealousy of her husband. Eventually things are straightened out when the husband tells Madeline that he knew of her secret about her time in London all along.

== Cast ==
- T. Roy Barnes as Val Romney
- Lloyd T. Whitlock as Loton
- Helene Chadwick as Madeline
- Andrew Robson as Mr. Secor
- Cesare Gravina as Jahoda

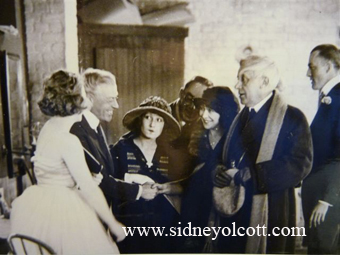
Maurice Maeterlinck visits Goldwyn studios, welcomed by Sidney Olcott

== Production ==
The film was shot in Goldwyn studios in Culver City, California.

In Culver City, Olcott received on the set the prestigious visit of Maurice Maeterlinck, Belgian poet, Nobel prize of literature 1911.
