= Adoration (1928 film) =

1928 film

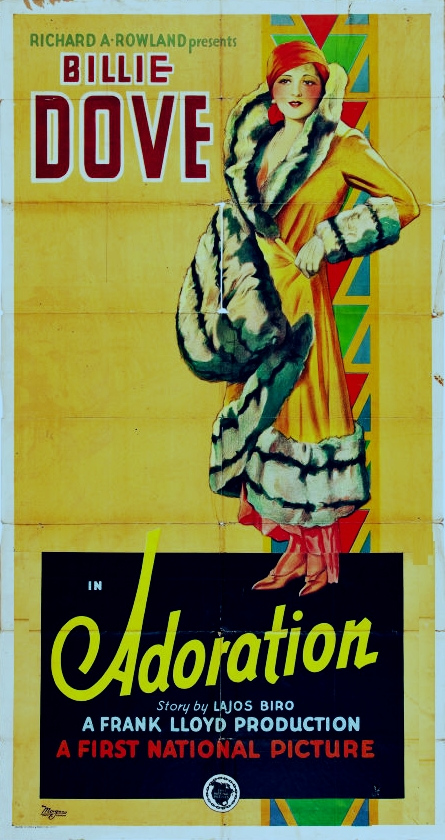
- Theatrical poster
- Directed by: Frank Lloyd
- Written by: Winifred Dunn (scenario)
- Story by: Lajos Biró
- Produced by: Frank Lloyd
- Starring: Billie Dove; Antonio Moreno; Emile Chautard; Lucy Doraine
- Cinematography: John F. Seitz
- Edited by: John Rawlins; Frank Stone
- Music by: Max Bergunker; Gerard Carbonara; Karl Hajos
- Distributed by: First National Pictures: a subsidiary of Warner Bros. Pictures
- Release date: December 2, 1928 (U.S.)
- Running time: 73 minutes
- Country: United States
- Languages: Sound (Synchronized); English Intertitles

Adoration is a 1928 American synchronized sound drama film. While the film has no audible dialog, it was released with a synchronized musical score with sound effects using the sound-on-disc Vitaphone process. The film was released by First National Pictures, a subsidiary of Warner Bros. Pictures, and directed by Frank Lloyd. It stars Billie Dove, Antonio Moreno, Emile Chautard and Lucy Doraine. The film was also issued in a shorter silent version for theatres that were not yet wired for sound.

== Plot ==
Russian prince, upon returning from the front, sees his wife in the company of a blackguard count. Prince becomes jealous, and, later, while attempting to break into the count's home, both he and the count are knocked unconscious by the mob. Prince, wife and count escape from Russia and eventually get to Paris, where wife is able to convince prince that it was her maid who went to the count's home.

== Cast ==
(with roles played after the Russian revolution in parentheses)

- Billie Dove as Princess Elena (Mannequin at modiste shop & waitress at Russian Cafe in Paris)
- Antonio Moreno as Prince Serge Orloff (Waiter at low cafe in Paris)
- Emile Chautard as General Murajev (Bootblack in Paris)
- Lucy Doraine as Ninette the French Maid (Running gambling house in Paris)
- Nicholas Bela as Ivan the Valet (Head waiter at Russian Cafe in Paris)
- Nicholas Soussanin as Count Vladimir (Proprietor of gambling house in Paris)
- Winifred Bryson as Baroness (Waitress at Russian Cafe in Paris)
- Lucien Prival as Baron (Fate unknown after revolution)

== Music ==
The theme song for this film was entitled "Adoration" and was composed by Karl Hajos.

== Preservation ==
Prints of Adoration are held by the Library of Congress and the Cineteca Nazionale. A full reconstruction of the film using all extant footage and Vitaphone discs was released by the Vitaphone Soundtrack Project on YouTube in 2026.

== See also ==
- List of early sound feature films (1926–1929)
