= The Servant in the House =

1921 film

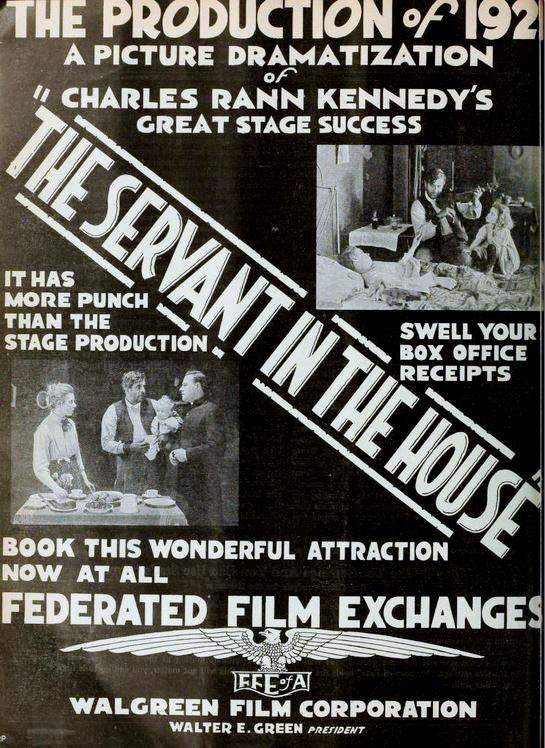
- Ad for film
- Directed by: Jack Conway
- Written by: Lanier Bartlett
- Based on: The Servant in the House (play) by Charles Rann Kennedy
- Produced by: Triangle Film Corporation
- Starring: Jean Hersholt
- Cinematography: Elgin Lessley
- Distributed by: Film Booking Offices of America (re-release)
- Release date: July 1920
- Running time: 8–9 reels
- Country: United States
- Language: Silent (English intertitles)

The Servant in the House is a lost 1921 American silent drama film directed by Jack Conway based on a 1908 Broadway play, The Servant in the House by Charles Rann Kennedy.

== Cast ==
- Jean Hersholt as Manson, The Servant
- Jack Curtis as Robert Smith
- Claire Anderson as Mary Smith
- Clara Horton as Mary Smith, Her Daughter
- Zenaide Williams as Martha, The Vicar's Wife
- Edward Peil Sr. as William Smythe, The Vicar
- Harvey Clark as The Bishop of Lancashire
- John Gilbert (as Jack Gilbert) as Percival
- Anna Dodge (as Mrs. George Hernandez) as Janitress

== Production ==
This film was shot in 1918 by the historic Triangle Film Corporation and has a checkered distribution history. By 1920, Triangle had gone out of business. The film had a limited release in mid-1920 and was acquired by a different distributor, Film Booking Offices of America, in late 1920 for re-release in 1921.
