= Her Face Value =

1921 film

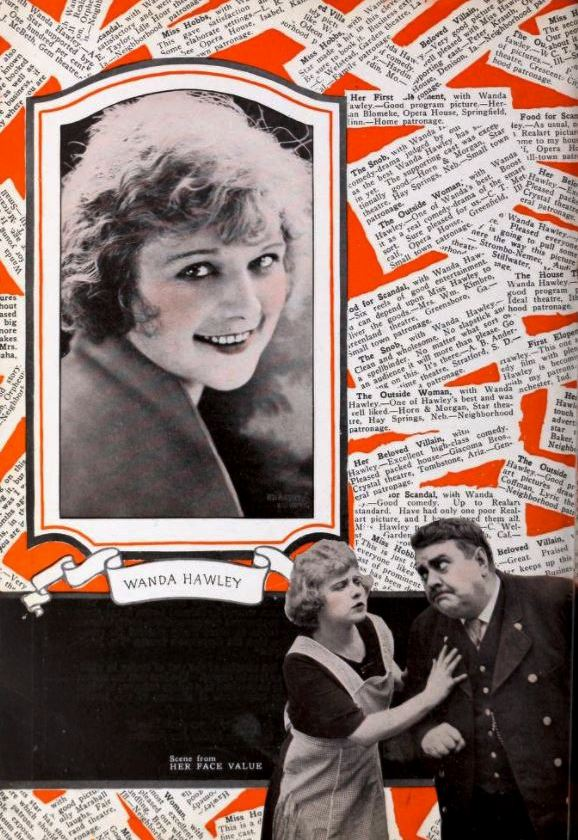
- Advertisement
- Directed by: Thomas N. Heffron
- Screenplay by: Percy Heath
- Based on: "The Girl Who Paid Dividends" by Earl Derr Biggers
- Starring: Wanda Hawley; Lincoln Plumer; Richard Rosson; T. Roy Barnes; Winifred Bryson; Donald MacDonald; Harvey Clark
- Cinematography: William E. Collins
- Production company: Realart Pictures Corporation
- Distributed by: Paramount Pictures
- Release date: October 13, 1921
- Running time: 50 minutes
- Country: United States
- Language: Silent (English intertitles)

Her Face Value is a 1921 American silent drama film directed by Thomas N. Heffron and written by Percy Heath based upon a story by Earl Derr Biggers. The film stars Wanda Hawley, Lincoln Plumer, Richard Rosson, T. Roy Barnes, Winifred Bryson, Donald MacDonald, and Harvey Clark. The film was released on October 13, 1921, by Paramount Pictures.

== Plot ==
As described in a film magazine, chorus girl Peggy Malone marries the press agent of her company Jimmy Parsons and, after it disbands, retires to domestic life. She returns to the stage when her constantly visiting relatives cause a drifting apart of husband and wife. She subsequently joins a motion picture company, wins fame, is injured, and by the end of the film regains her husband and happiness.

== Cast ==
- Wanda Hawley as Peggy Malone
- Lincoln Plumer as Pop Malone
- Richard Rosson as Eddie Malone (credited as Dick Rosson)
- T. Roy Barnes as Jimmy Parsons
- Winifred Bryson as Laurette
- Donald MacDonald as Martin Fox
- Harvey Clark as F.B. Sturgeon
- George Periolat as James R. Greenwood
- Eugene Burr as Jack Darian
- Ah Wing as Chinaman

== Critical reception ==
The Kansas City Journal stated, "If you like honest-to-goodness comedy, the kind which does not draw on your gray matter to decide intricate social problems after a hard day's work, line up at the box office of the Mainstreet. It's worth it. Nobody is hit in the face with a pie, nor is there a race through an endless succession of doors. Most of the time offered laugh getters have been scrapped and the comedy lines and situations first thought out by the author of the magazine story upon which the picture is built are relied upon to carry it across to the audience—and they do."
