= The Law Forbids =

1924 film

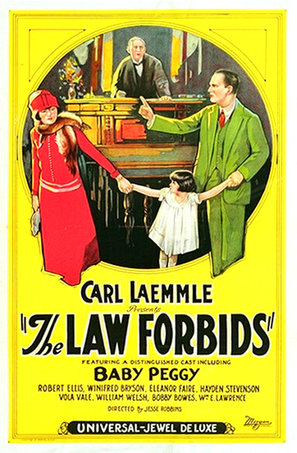
- Theatrical release poster
- Directed by: Jess Robbins
- Screenplay by: Lois Zellner; Ford Beebe
- Story by: Bernard McConville
- Starring: Baby Peggy; Robert Ellis; Elinor Fair; Winifred Bryson; James Corrigan; Anna Dodge
- Cinematography: Charles E. Kaufman; Jack Stevens
- Production company: Universal Pictures
- Distributed by: Universal Pictures
- Release date: April 7, 1924
- Running time: 60 minutes
- Country: United States
- Language: Silent (English intertitles)

The Law Forbids is a 1924 American drama film directed by Jess Robbins and written by Lois Zellner and Ford Beebe. The film stars Baby Peggy, Robert Ellis, Elinor Fair, Winifred Bryson, James Corrigan, and Anna Dodge. The film was released on April 7, 1924, by Universal Pictures.

== Plot ==
As described in a film magazine review, playwright Paul Remsen and his wife Rhoda separate. Rhoda takes their daughter Peggy with her to live in the country, where Peggy has a pet rooster named Alexander. Peggy makes her way to New York City in search of her father. He has become entangled with a vamp actress Inez Lamont, who is in a new play he has written. The child wanders first backstage and then onto the stage on the opening night of the production. Through her a reconciliation occurs between the parents.

== Cast ==
- Baby Peggy as Peggy Remsen
- Robert Ellis as Paul Remsen
- Elinor Fair as Rhoda Remsen
- Winifred Bryson as Inez Lamont
- James Corrigan as John Martin
- Anna Dodge as Martha Martin (credited as Anna Hernandez)
- Joseph J. Dowling as Judge
- Ned Sparks as Clyde Vernon
- Eva Thatcher as Mrs. Grimes
- Victor Potel as Joel Andrews
- W. E. Lawrence as Monte Hanley (credited as William E. Lawrence)
- Hayden Stevenson as Lawyer for the Defense
- William Welsh as Lawyer for the Plaintiff (credited as William Welch)
- Bobby Bowes as Theatrical Producer
- Billy Butts as Boy in car (uncredited)

A Universal Pictures publication showing the cast for the film includes Robert Bolder, Merta Sterling, and Vola Vale, who may all have had uncredited roles, possibly in the stage production.

== Preservation ==
An incomplete copy of The Law Forbids is held in a film collection in the Netherlands.
