= Outside the Law (1930 film) =

American pre-Code crime film

- German theatrical release poster
- Directed by: Tod Browning
- Written by: Tod Browning; Garrett Fort
- Produced by: E. M. Asher; Tod Browning; Carl Laemmle Jr.
- Starring: Edward G. Robinson; Mary Nolan
- Cinematography: Roy F. Overbaugh
- Edited by: Milton Carruth
- Distributed by: Universal Studios
- Release date: August 1930
- Running time: 70 minutes
- Country: United States
- Language: English

Outside the Law is a 1930 American pre-Code crime film directed by Tod Browning and starring Edward G. Robinson. The picture is a remake of the 1920 film of the same name, starring Lon Chaney which was also directed by Browning.

== Plot ==
Outside the Law (1930)

Cobra Collins, the ruthless boss of a criminal gang, willing to do anything to prevent a rival gangster from pulling off a bank robbery on 'his' patch.

== Cast ==
- Edward G. Robinson as Cobra Collins
- Mary Nolan as Connie Madden
- Owen Moore as Fingers' ODell
- Eddie Sturgis as Jake
- John George as Humpy (* George also played Humpy in 1920 film)
- Delmar Watson as The Kid
- DeWitt Jennings as Police Chief
- Rockliffe Fellowes as Police Captain
- Frank Burke as District Attorney
- Sidney Bracey as Assistant District Attorney
- Rose Plumer as Onlooker outside the bank
- Louise Beavers as Judy, the maid
- Matthew Betz as Stage Manager
- Charley Rogers as Cigar Clerk
