= Wide Open (film) =

1930 film

- Poster
- Directed by: Archie Mayo
- Written by: James A. Starr; Arthur Caesar
- Based on: The Narrow Street (1924 novel) by Edward Bateman Morris
- Starring: Edward Everett Horton; Patsy Ruth Miller
- Cinematography: Ben Reynolds
- Music by: Louis Silvers
- Production company: Warner Bros. Pictures
- Distributed by: Warner Bros. Pictures
- Release date: February 1, 1930
- Running time: 67 minutes
- Country: United States
- Language: English

Wide Open is a 1930 American pre-Code romantic comedy film directed by Archie Mayo, starring Edward Everett Horton and Patsy Ruth Miller, and featuring Louise Fazenda, T. Roy Barnes and Edna Murphy. Released by Warner Bros. Pictures, it is based on the 1924 novel The Narrow Street by Edward Bateman Morris.

Warner Bros. had previously released a silent adaptation of Morris's novel in 1924 under the title The Narrow Street.

Wide Open was the last of four comedies Horton and Miller made together at Warner Bros. in 1929 and 1930; in 1931 they were paired one last time at RKO in Lonely Wives.

== Plot ==
Unassertive bookkeeper Simon Haldane is the butt of everyone's jokes at work. Co-worker Agatha is desperately in love with him. One rainy night, Agatha's mother, with Agatha in tow, visits him at home to insist that he marry her. Outside, two detectives chase a mysterious young woman, who eludes them by slipping unnoticed into Simon's house and hiding in a closet. When the detectives enter the premises, Simon manages to get rid of them and Agatha and her mother.

Simon discovers the intruder, who calls herself Doris, in her undergarments after she emerges from hiding to dry her clothes in front of a fireplace. Having absolutely no interest in women, he makes flustered attempts to get rid of her. Doris responds by pretending to faint. A doctor is summoned; he insists the woman not be moved for several days. Simon gives her his bed and sleeps in another room.

Easter, Simon's maid, shows up the next morning. She hears the sound of a woman's voice emerging from Simon's bedroom and assumes that he must have gotten married. When a co-worker telephones to find out why Simon is late for work, Easter answers and passes along the misconception. At the office of the Faulkner Phonograph Company, the rest of the staff, led by obnoxious salesman Bob Wyeth, congratulate him.

That night, they invade Simon's house against his will in party hats with confetti and throw a riotous celebration, during which Agatha gets drunk and pitifully sings "Nobody Cares If I'm Blue." Doris finally gets them to leave.

As time goes by, Simon reconsiders his indifference to women. He is therefore crestfallen when Doris leaves one day without warning. Easter tells him she called for a taxi, but went off with Wyeth when he offered a ride to the train station.

When Mr. Faulkner returns unexpectedly early, he begins a major shakeup at his struggling firm. Simon is summoned for a meeting. Expecting to be fired, he is shocked when it turns out that Faulkner has somehow learned of his ideas for saving the company and is promoting him to general manager, replacing Trundle. Simon soon has the company back on its feet. When Wyeth returns from a business trip, he is unimpressed by Simon's promotion. Simon, believing Wyeth has stolen Doris's affections, asserts his authority by punching Wyeth in the face several times.

Then Faulkner has another surprise for him. He introduces Simon to his daughter Julia, who turns out to be Doris. Julia explains that they had suspected Trundle of undermining the company, but could not examine the books without alerting him. So she instead examined the ledgers that Simon brought home to work on, which confirmed the sabotage. Faulkner gives Simon a half interest in the company, but is pleased when Simon offers it back in exchange for a delighted Julia.

== Cast ==
- Edward Everett Horton as Simon Haldane
- Patsy Ruth Miller as Julia Faulkner ("Doris")
- Louise Fazenda as Agatha Hathaway
- Vera Lewis as Agatha's Mother
- T. Roy Barnes as Bob Wyeth
- E. J. Ratcliffe as Trundle
- Louise Beavers as Easter
- Edna Murphy as Nell Martin
- Frank Beal as Faulkner
- Vince Barnett as Dvorak
- Lloyd Ingraham as doctor
- Bobby Gordon as office boy
- B.B.B. as Richards
- Fred Kelsey as detective
- Robert Dudley as office worker

== Music ==
The film features a song entitled "She’s Just The Type for Me" with words by Bud Green and music by Sam H. Stept. The untitled theme song (which is played frequently throughout the film beginning with the starting titles) was composed by the same team.

== Preservation ==
The film survives complete. It was transferred onto 16mm film by Associated Artists Productions in the 1950s and shown on television. A 16mm copy is housed at the Wisconsin Center for Film & Theater Research. It also is preserved at the Library of Congress, likely in a nitrate copy going by the library's singular F listing.
