= Flirting with Love =

1924 film

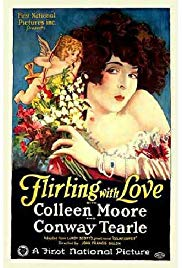
- Poster
- Directed by: John Francis Dillon
- Written by: Joseph F. Poland
- Based on: "Counterfeit" by Leroy Scott
- Starring: Colleen Moore; Conway Tearle; Winifred Bryson
- Cinematography: Ted D. McCord
- Edited by: LeRoy Stone
- Production company: First National Pictures
- Distributed by: First National Pictures
- Release date: August 17, 1924
- Running time: 70 minutes
- Country: United States
- Language: Silent (English intertitles)

Flirting with Love is a 1924 American silent comedy drama film directed by John Francis Dillon and starring Colleen Moore, Conway Tearle, and Winifred Bryson. It is based upon the short story "Counterfeit" by Leroy Scott.

== Cast ==
- Colleen Moore as Gilda Lamont
- Conway Tearle as Wade Cameron
- Winifred Bryson as Estelle Van Arden
- Frances Raymond as Mrs. Cameron
- John Patrick as Dickie Harrison
- Alan Roscoe as Franklyn Stone
- William Gould as John Williams
- Marga Rubia Levy as Henderson

== Preservation ==
With no copies of Flirting with Love located in any film archives, it is a lost film.

== Bibliography ==
- Donald W. McCaffrey and Christopher P. Jacobs. Guide to the Silent Years of American Cinema. Greenwood Publishing, 1999. ISBN 0-313-30345-2
