= Your Wife and Mine =

1927 film

- Directed by: Frank O'Connor
- Written by: Marc Edmund Jones
- Produced by: Samuel Zierler
- Starring: Phyllis Haver; Stuart Holmes; Wallace MacDonald
- Cinematography: André Barlatier
- Production company: Excellent Pictures
- Distributed by: Excellent Pictures
- Release date: August 1, 1927
- Running time: 60 minutes
- Country: United States
- Languages: Silent; English intertitles

Your Wife and Mine is a 1927 American silent comedy film directed by Frank O'Connor and starring Phyllis Haver, Stuart Holmes, and Wallace MacDonald.

== Cast ==
- Phyllis Haver as Phyllis Warren
- Stuart Holmes as Charlie Martin
- Wallace MacDonald as Robert Warren
- Barbara Tennant as Prisoner
- Katherine Lewis as Winifred Martin
- Blanche Upright as Mrs. Coy
- June Lufboro as Tabitha Tubbs
- Jay Emmett as Antonio Tubbs

== Bibliography ==
- George A. Katchmer. Eighty Silent Film Stars: Biographies and Filmographies of the Obscure to the Well Known. McFarland, 1991.
