= Tillie (film) =

1922 film

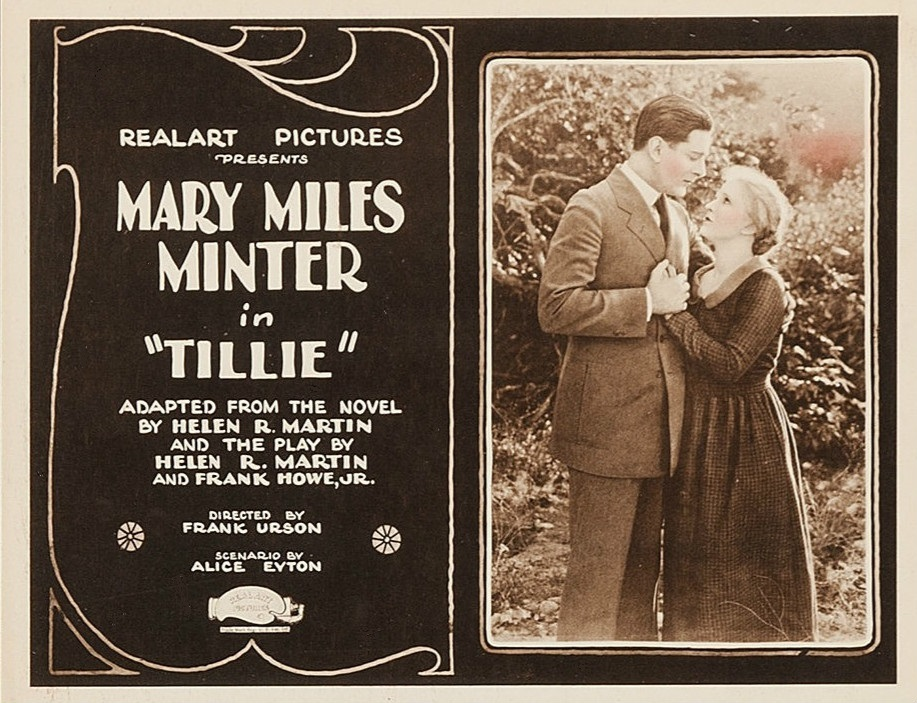
- Lobby card
- Directed by: Frank Urson
- Screenplay by: Alice Eyton
- Based on: Tillie, a Mennonite Maid by Helen Reimensnyder Martin
- Starring: Mary Miles Minter; Allan Forrest; Noah Beery, Sr.
- Cinematography: Allen M. Davey
- Production company: Realart Pictures Corporation
- Distributed by: Realart Pictures Corporation
- Release date: January 29, 1922
- Running time: 5 reels
- Country: United States
- Language: Silent (English intertitles)

Tillie is a 1922 American silent drama film directed by Frank Urson and starring Mary Miles Minter. The scenario was written by Alice Eyton, based on the novel Tillie, the Mennonite Maid by Helen Reimensnyder Martin. Tillie reunited Minter with Allan Forrest, her most frequent leading man from her time at Mutual Film and the American Film Company, for the first time since their 1919 picture Yvonne from Paris. As with many of Minter's features, Tillie is thought to be a lost film.

== Plot ==
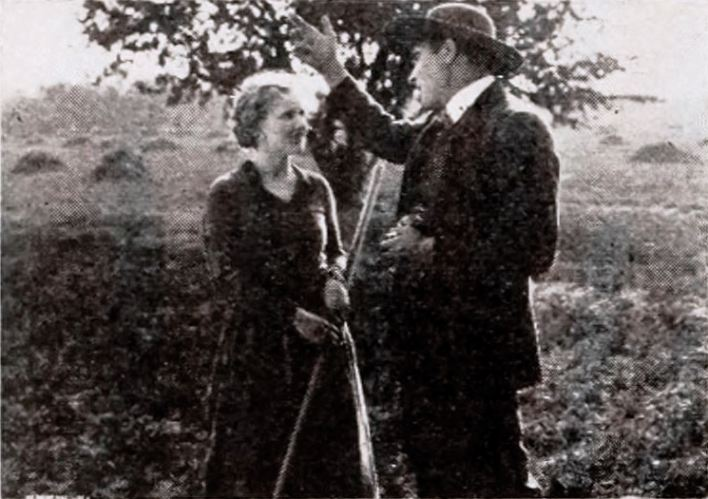
Mary Miles Minter in "Tillie" (1922)

As described in various film magazine reviews, Tillie Getz is a girl living in a community of Mennonites with her harsh father Jacob Getz, who treats her little better than a slave. Tillie longs for education and for an escape from the drudgery of her life, but only the kindly Doc Weaver understands her ambitions.

Unbeknownst to Tillie, an elderly relative has willed her a small fortune, but only if she should enter into the Mennonite church by the time she has turned eighteen. Her father pressures her into joining the church, but Tillie resists, just as she resists the efforts of a local lawyer to push her into marriage with the undesirable Absalom. The lawyer and Absalom are both aware of the terms of the will, and plot to share Tillie's fortune between them once they have convinced her to wed.

One day, Jack Fairchild comes to the town and finding himself captivated by Tillie, he takes up the position of the local schoolmaster so that he can remain close to her. In this way, the ambitions of Tillie's father, the lawyer and Absalom are all thwarted, and Tillie finds love with Jack and freedom from the Mennonite way of life.

== Cast ==
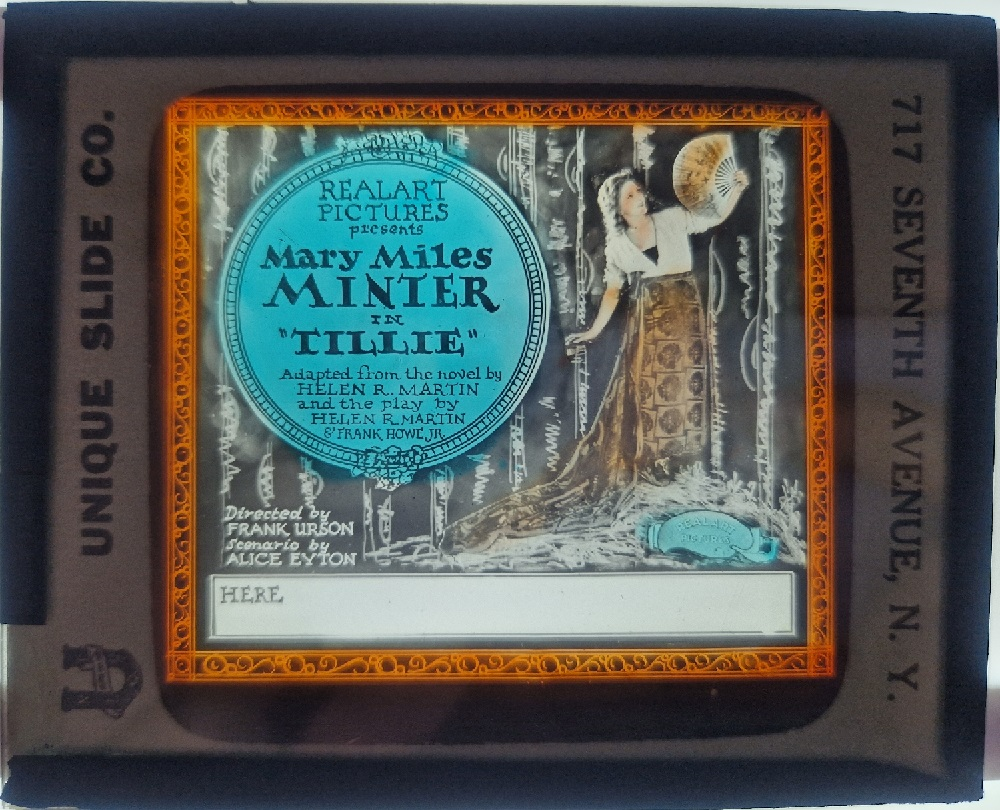
Lantern Slide for "Tillie"

- Mary Miles Minter as Tillie Getz
- Noah Beery, Sr. as Jacob Getz
- Allan Forrest as Jack Fairchild
- Lucien Littlefield as Doc Weaver
- Lillian Leighton as Sarah Oberholtzzer
- Marie Trebaol as Sallie Getz
- Virginia Adair as Louisa
- Robert Anderson as Absalom Puntz
- Edward Cooper as Lawyer
