= Always Goodbye =

Always Goodbye is the title of two U.S. films:

- Always Goodbye (1931 film), a drama starring Elissa Landi, Lewis Stone and Paul Cavanagh
- Always Goodbye (1938 film), a romantic drama starring Barbara Stanwyck, Herbert Marshall and Ian Hunter
