= The Eyes of Julia Deep =

1918 film by Lloyd Ingraham

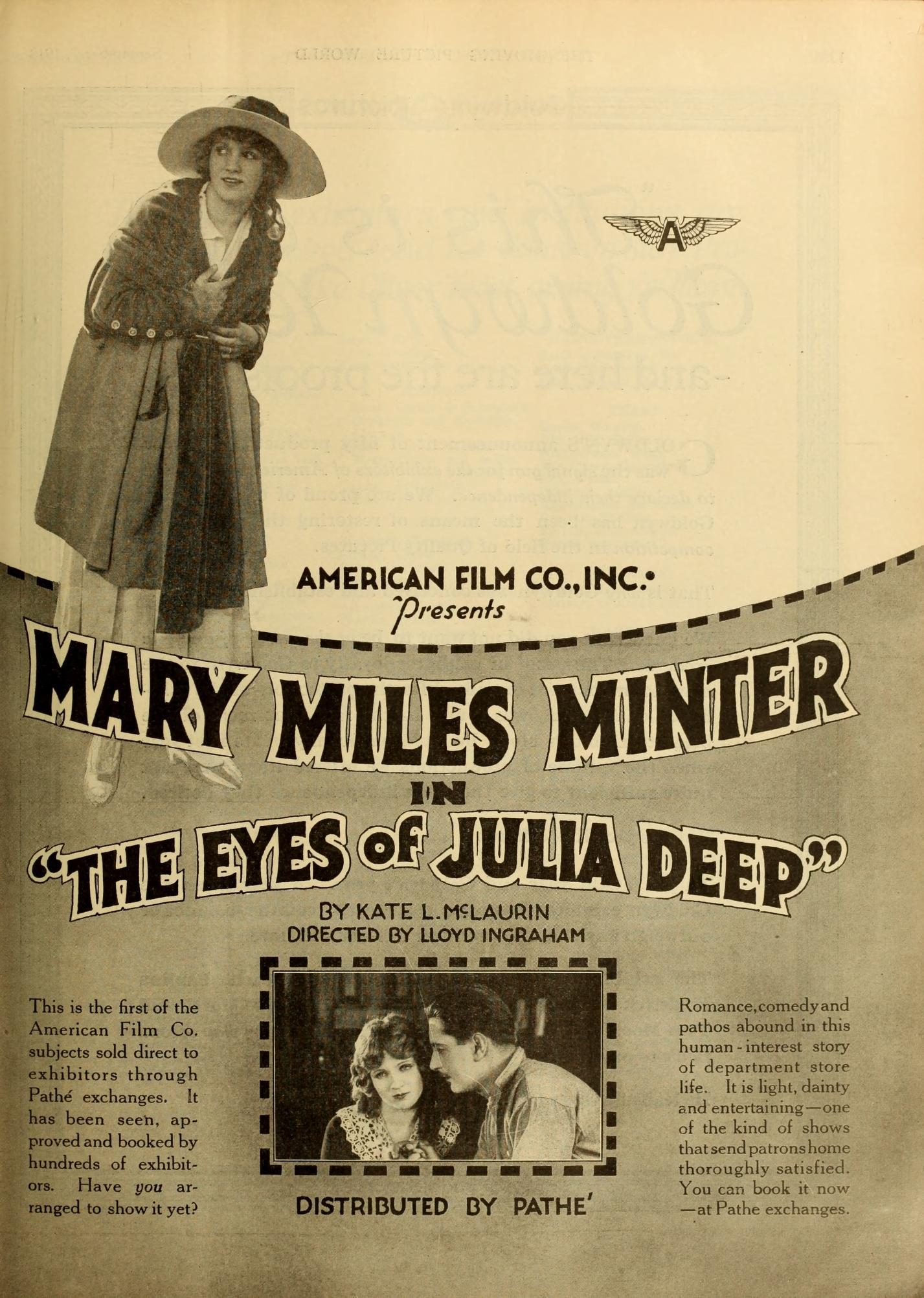
- Directed by: Lloyd Ingraham
- Written by: Elizabeth Mahoney
- Based on: The Eyes of Julia Deep by Kate L. McLaurin
- Starring: Mary Miles Minter; Allan Forrest
- Cinematography: Frank Urson
- Production company: American Film Company
- Distributed by: Pathé Exchange
- Release date: September 15, 1918 (United States)
- Running time: 5 reels
- Country: United States
- Language: Silent (English intertitles)

The Eyes of Julia Deep is a 1918 American silent comedy-drama film starring Mary Miles Minter and directed by Lloyd Ingraham. The film is based on the short story by the same name, written by Kate L. McLaurin. It is one of the few films starring Minter which are known to have survived, and one of even fewer readily available for the general public to view.

In addition to being readily available to view, the film is described in various film magazine summaries and reviews.

== Plot ==
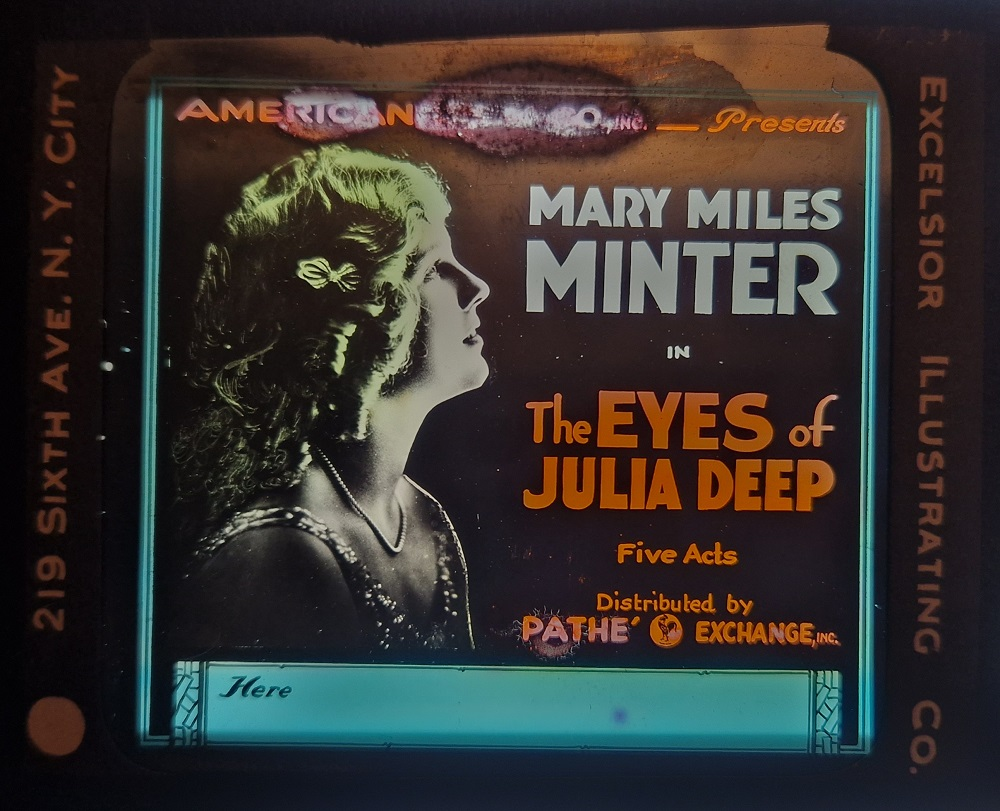
Lantern Slide for "The Eyes of Julia Deep"

Julia Deep is a lonely girl who works at the returns desk of a department store and lives in the top room of a boarding house run by Mrs. Turner. The best suite in the boarding house is taken by Terry Hartridge, a young man who is wasting his inheritance in partying, encouraged by his girlfriend, the stock company actress Lottie Driscoll.

As Terry is rarely present, Julia has taken to sneaking into his rooms to read his extensive collection of books. One night Terry returns in a fit of depression, having broken up with Lottie and spent the last of his fortune. Julia hides, but when Terry takes out a gun and seems about to commit suicide, she jumps out to stop him. When Terry explains his troubles to her, she decides that she will take charge of his life and finances.

With Julia's encouragement, Terry soon finds work, first mending roads, and then at the department store, which is run by his father's old friend Timothy Black. He neglects his work to flirt with Julia at the returns desk, but it is Julia that is fired for this, not Terry. Terry proposes marriage to her, but Julia turns him down, fearful that an unemployed former shop-girl will hold him back in life.

Meanwhile, Julia's regular customer Mrs. Lowe, a wealthy widow who is fond of the girl, tries to persuade Black to rehire her without success. She offers Julia a job as her live-in secretary, which Julia initially turns down. However, after meeting Terry for lunch at the park, Julia is approached by a jealous Lottie, who manages to convince Julia that she is heartbroken over the loss of Terry, to the point of suicide. Taken in by Lottie's acting, Julia leaves Terry and the boarding house and takes up the position with Mrs. Lowe.

Terry follows Julia to Mrs. Lowe's house, and proves to her that Lottie was lying when he takes her to the theatre to witness Lottie running through the same performance on stage. Convinced of Terry's sincerity, the two elope with the intention of getting married. Mrs. Lowe and Mr. Black, however, mistrusting of Terry and Julia respectively, pursue them, and the four create such a disturbance that the sheriff of the little town is forced to arrest them all.

After a night locked up in the town jail, Terry and Julia escape through the window, but leave Mrs. Lowe and Mr. Black behind. The two resolve their differences, and it transpires that they were sweethearts in their youth. It is the older couple who are hastily married by Simon Plummet, and when Terry and Julia return, having led the local law enforcement on a chase round the town, the newlyweds promise that they will give the two of them a proper marriage ceremony.

== Cast ==
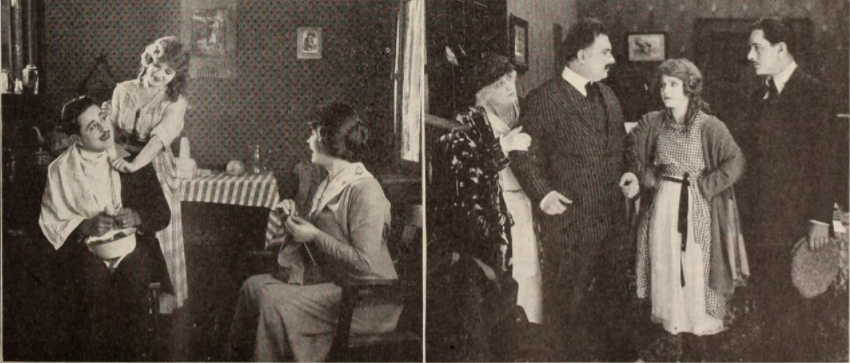
Two scenes from "The Eyes of Julia Deep" (1918)

- Mary Miles Minter as Julia Deep
- Allan Forrest as Terry Hartridge
- Alice Wilson as Lottie Driscoll
- George Periolat as Timothy Black
- Ida Easthope as Mrs. Turner
- Eugenie Besserer as Mrs. Lowe
- Carl Stockdale as Simon Plummet
