= Urson =

Urson may refer to:

- Frank Urson (1887–1928), American silent film director and cinematographer
- Ursolic acid
- North American porcupine
