= Allan Forrest =

American actor (1885–1941)

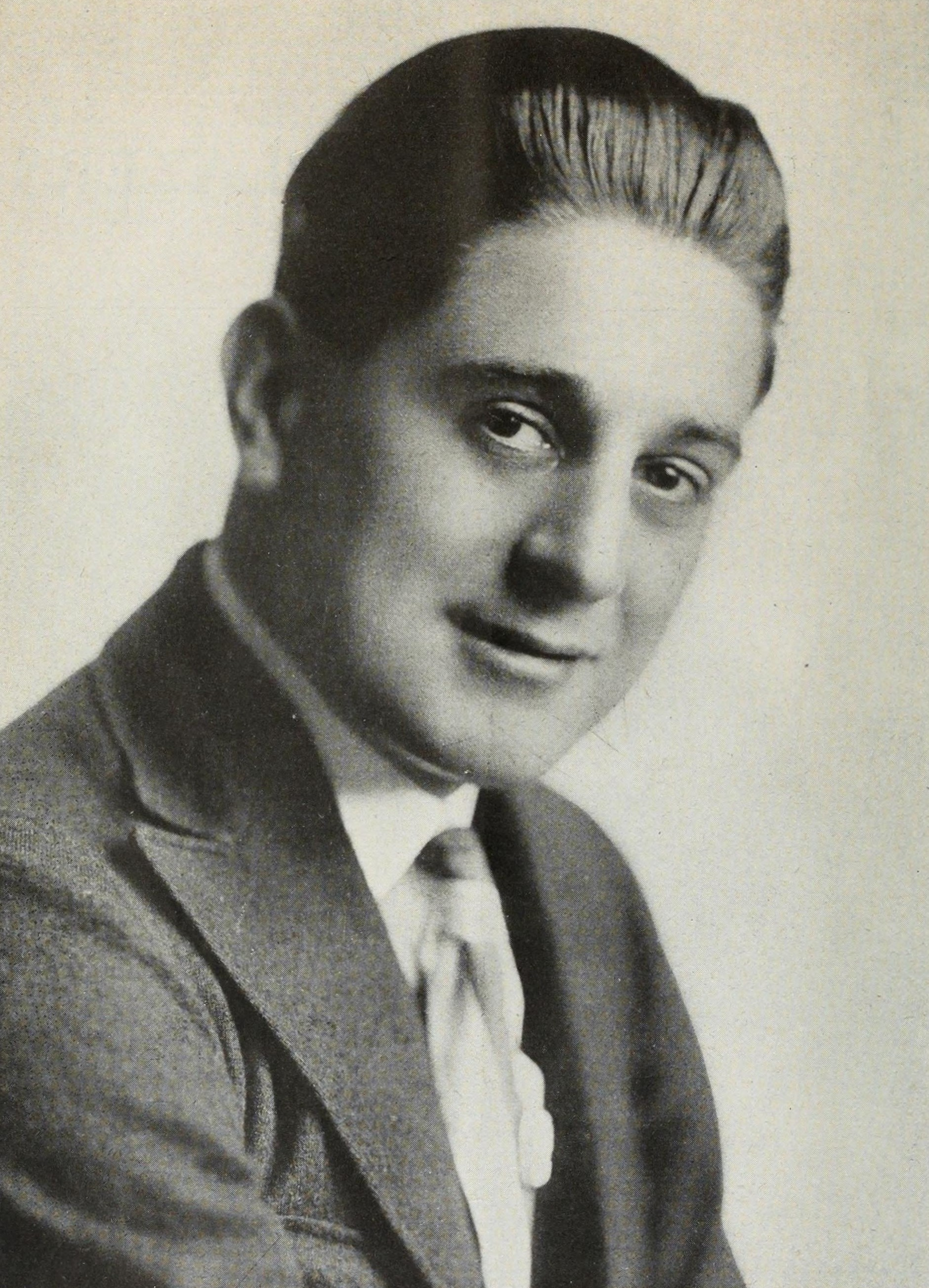
- Forrest in 1917
- Born: Allan Forrest Fisher; September 1, 1885; Brooklyn, New York, U.S.
- Died: July 25, 1941 (aged 55); Detroit, Michigan, U.S.
- Resting place: Forest Lawn Memorial Park, Glendale, California, U.S.
- Occupation: Actor
- Years active: 1914–1932
- Spouses: Ann Little (m. 1916; div. 1918) Lottie Pickford (m. 1922; div. 1928)

Allan Forrest Fisher (September 1, 1885 – July 25, 1941) was an American silent film actor.

== Life and career ==
Allan Forrest Fisher starred in 119 films, mostly silent, between 1913 and 1932. He appeared in films such as The Torch Bearer, with actress Charlotte Burton.

in 1916, he married actress Ann Little; they were divorced in 1918. On January 8, 1922, Forrest married actress Lottie Pickford in Hollywood. They divorced in 1928.

== Partial filmography ==
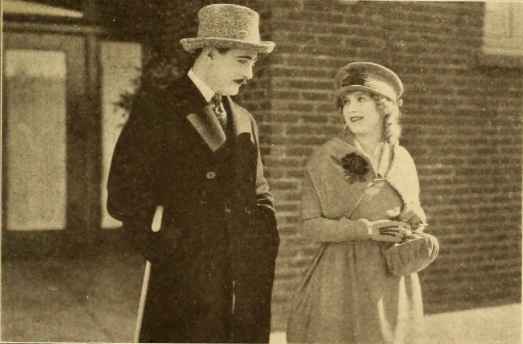
Allan Forrest and Mary Miles Minter in "A Bit of Jade" (1918)

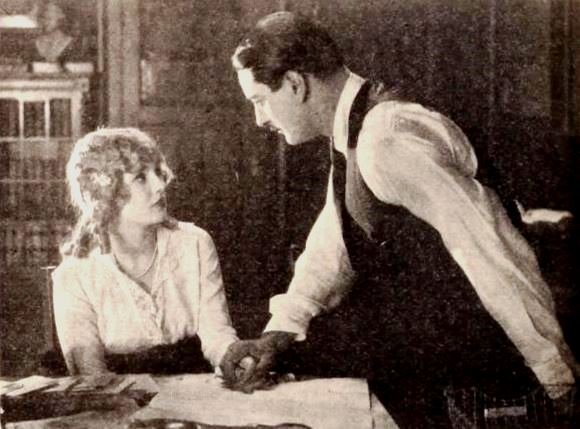
Allan Forrest and Mary Miles Minter in "Powers That Prey" (1918)

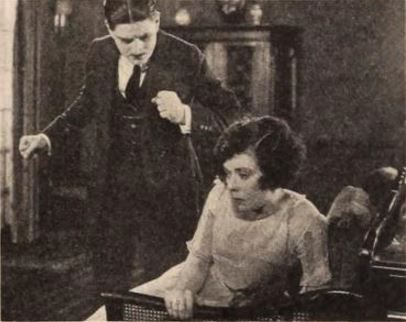
Allan Forrest and Lottie Pickford in "They Shall Pay" (1921)

- Called Back (1914)
- The Ruby Circle (1914)
- The Sign of the Spade (1916)
- Dulcie's Adventure (1916)
- Periwinkle (1917)
- Melissa of the Hills (1917)
- Charity Castle (1917)
- Her Country's Call (1917)
- Peggy Leads the Way (1917)
- The Mate of the Sally Ann (1917)
- Beauty and the Rogue (1918)
- Powers That Prey (1918)
- A Bit of Jade (1918)
- Social Briars (1918)
- The Ghost of Rosy Taylor (1918)
- The Eyes of Julia Deep (1918)
- Rosemary Climbs the Heights (1918)
- The Amazing Impostor (1919)
- The Intrusion of Isabel (1919)
- A Bachelor's Wife (1919)
- Yvonne from Paris (1919)
- Over the Garden Wall (1919)
- Li Ting Lang (1920)
- The Purple Cipher (1920)
- Cheated Love (1921)
- The Invisible Fear (1921)
- The Hole in the Wall (1921)
- The Man from Lost River (1921)
- What Women Will Do (1921)
- The Forgotten Woman (1921)
- They Shall Pay (1921)
- Tillie (1922)
- Very Truly Yours (1922)
- Lights of the Desert (1922)
- The New Teacher (1922)
- Seeing's Believing (1922)
- The Heart Specialist (1922)
- Long Live the King (1923)
- Crinoline and Romance (1923)
- A Noise in Newboro (1923)
- The Siren of Seville (1924)
- Don't Doubt Your Husband (1924)
- In Love with Love (1924)
- Dorothy Vernon of Haddon Hall (1924)
- The Dressmaker from Paris (1925)
- Pampered Youth (1925)
- Rose of the World (1925)
- The Prince of Pilsen (1926)
- The Carnival Girl (1926)
- Two Can Play (1926)
- Fifth Avenue (1926)
- The Phantom Bullet (1926)
- Summer Bachelors (1926)
- The Desert Bride (1928)
- Sally of the Scandals (1928)
- The Winged Horseman (1929)
- The Phantom Express (1932)
