= Earl Metcalfe =

American actor

Earle Metcalfe
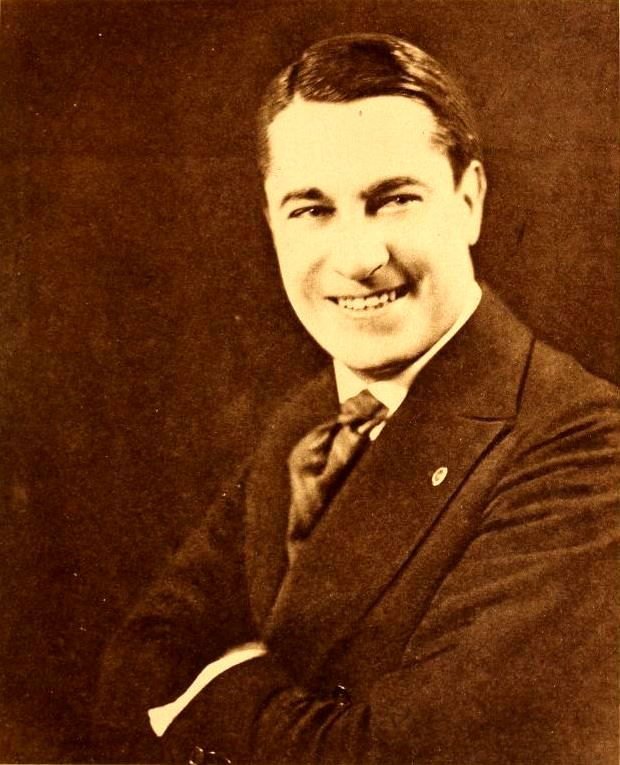
- Metcalfe in 1920
- Born: Earle Keeney Metcalfe; March 11, 1889; Newport, Kentucky, US
- Died: January 26, 1928 (aged 38); Burbank, California, US
- Other names: Earle Metcalfe; Earl Metcalf; Earle Metcalf
- Occupation: Actor
- Years active: 1912–1928

Earl Metcalfe (March 11, 1889 – January 26, 1928) was an American actor.

== Biography ==
Born in 1889, Metcalfe appeared in the films The Fortune Hunter, While New York Sleeps, What Women Will Do, White Eagle, While Justice Waits, The Great Night, Look Your Best, Skid Proof, Fair Week, The Silent Accuser, Silk Stocking Sal, The Man Without a Country, The Ship of Souls, Partners Again, With Buffalo Bill on the U. P. Trail, The Midnight Sun, The Call of the Klondike, The Midnight Message, The Mystery Club, Atta Boy, Love's Blindness, Remember, The Notorious Lady, and The Devil's Saddle, among others.

In a movie fight with actor/director Joseph Kaufman, Kaufman accidentally lost some teeth during the filming.

Metcalfe died during a flight in a biplane in 1928 over Glendale or Burbank California. He had taken up flying as a recreation and was undergoing pilot training. Various sources have Metcalfe falling from the airplane or jumping from it, indicating a suicide. The plane is reported to have been looping-the-loop or in a barrel roll, two different aerial maneuvers. The pilot Roy Wilson was unharmed.

== Partial filmography ==
- A Romance of the Border (1912)*short
- A Girl's Bravery (1912)*short
- The Moonshiner's Daughter (1912)*short
- Gentleman Joe (1912)*short
- Juan and Juanita (1912)*short
- The Water Rats (1912)*short
- Kitty and the Bandits (1912)*short
- The Bravery of Dora (1912)*short
- The Mexican Spy (1913)*short
- Private Smith (1913)*short
- The Price of Jealousy (1913)*short
- Down on the Rio Grande (1913)*short
- The Regeneration of Nancy (1913)*short
- The First Prize (1913)*short
- The Soul of a Rose (1913)*short
- Sixes and Nines (1913)
- The Moonshiner's Wife (1913)*short
- Women of the Desert (1913)*short
- The Daughters of Men (1914)
- The Ringtailed Rhinoceros (1915)
- The World to Live In (1919)
- Coax Me (1919)
- The Battler (1919)
- The Woman of Lies (1919)
- The Poison Pen (1919)
- The Fortune Hunter (1920)
- The Chamber Mystery (1920)
- The Garter Girl (1920)
- While New York Sleeps (1920)
- The Face at Your Window (1920)
- What Women Will Do (1921)
- Mother Eternal (1921)
- Eden and Return (1921)
- White Eagle (1922)
- Back to Yellow Jacket (1922)
- Ignorance (1922)
- The New Teacher (1922)
- Boomerang Justice (1922)
- While Justice Waits (1922)
- The Great Night (1922)
- The Power of a Lie (1922)
- Look Your Best (1923)
- Skid Proof (1923)
- The Lone Wagon (1923)
- Fair Week (1924)
- Surging Seas (1924)
- The Valley of Hate (1924)
- The Courageous Coward (1924)
- The Silent Accuser (1924)
- Silk Stocking Sal (1924)
- The Man Without a Country (1925)
- The Ship of Souls (1925)
- Sin Cargo (1926)
- The High Flyer (1926)
- Daring Deeds (1927)
- Night Life (1927)
