= Sin Cargo =

1926 silent film

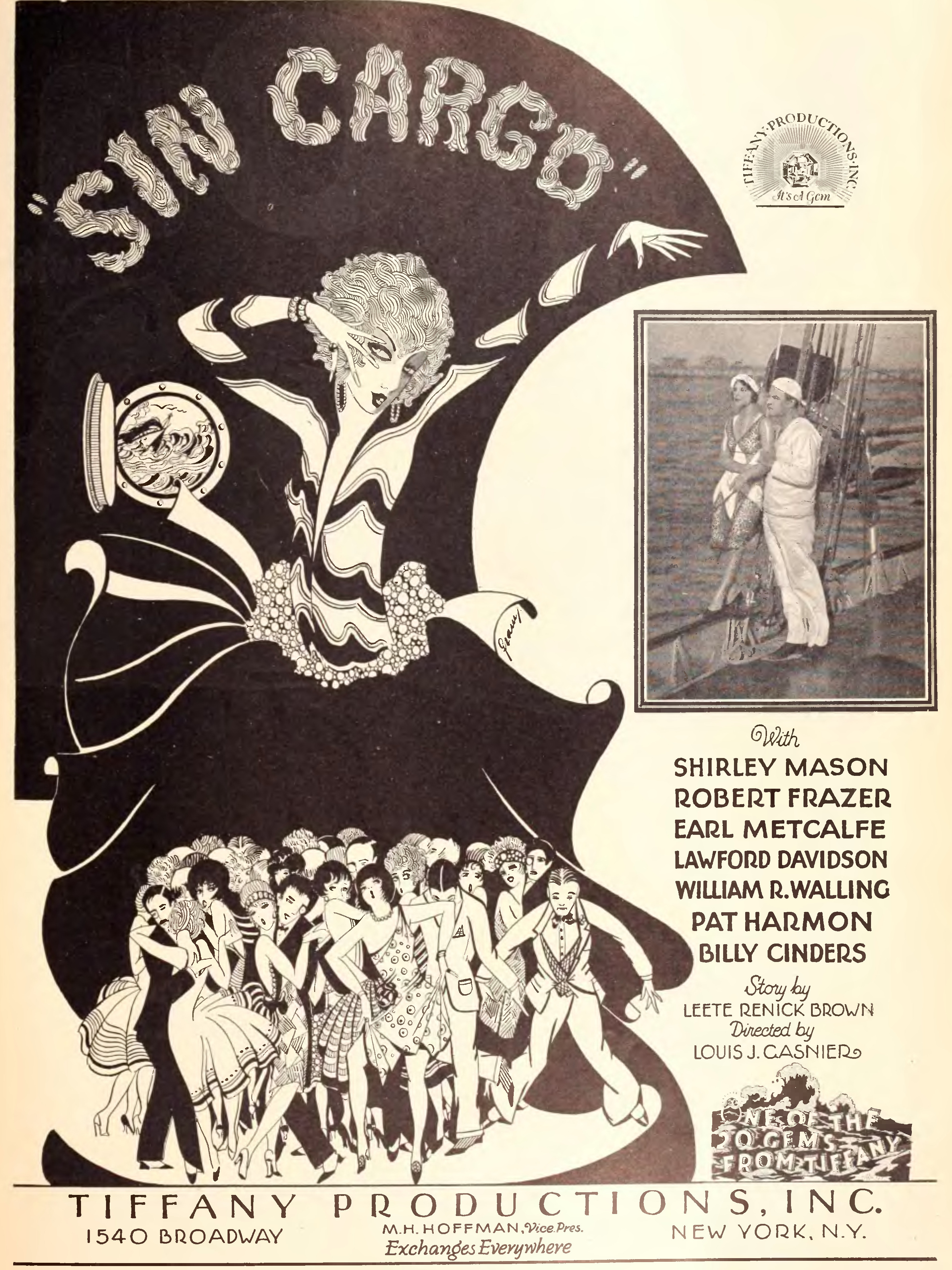
- Directed by: Louis J. Gasnier
- Written by: Leete Renick Brown (story); Jack Natteford
- Starring: Shirley Mason; Robert Frazer; Earl Metcalfe
- Cinematography: Milton Moore; Mack Stengler
- Edited by: Harold Young
- Production company: Tiffany Pictures
- Distributed by: Tiffany Pictures
- Release date: November 15, 1926
- Running time: 70 minutes
- Country: United States
- Languages: Silent; English intertitles

Sin Cargo is a 1926 American silent thriller film directed by Louis J. Gasnier and starring Shirley Mason, Robert Frazer and Earl Metcalfe. The film's sets were designed by the art director Edwin B. Willis.

== Plot ==
The film is about a man in financial ruin who becomes involved in pearl smuggling, but conceals the fact from his sister.

== Cast ==
- Shirley Mason as Eve Gibson
- Robert Frazer as Captain Matt Russell
- Earl Metcalfe as Harry Gibson
- Lawford Davidson as Jim Darrell
- Gertrude Astor as Mary Wickham
- Pat Harmon as Captain Barry
- Will Walling as Customs Official
- Billy Cinders as Cooper
- James T. Mack as Butler

== Preservation status ==
- The film is now lost.

== Bibliography ==
- Goble, Alan. The Complete Index to Literary Sources in Film. Walter de Gruyter, 1999.
