= Bruce Guerin =

American actor (1919–2012)

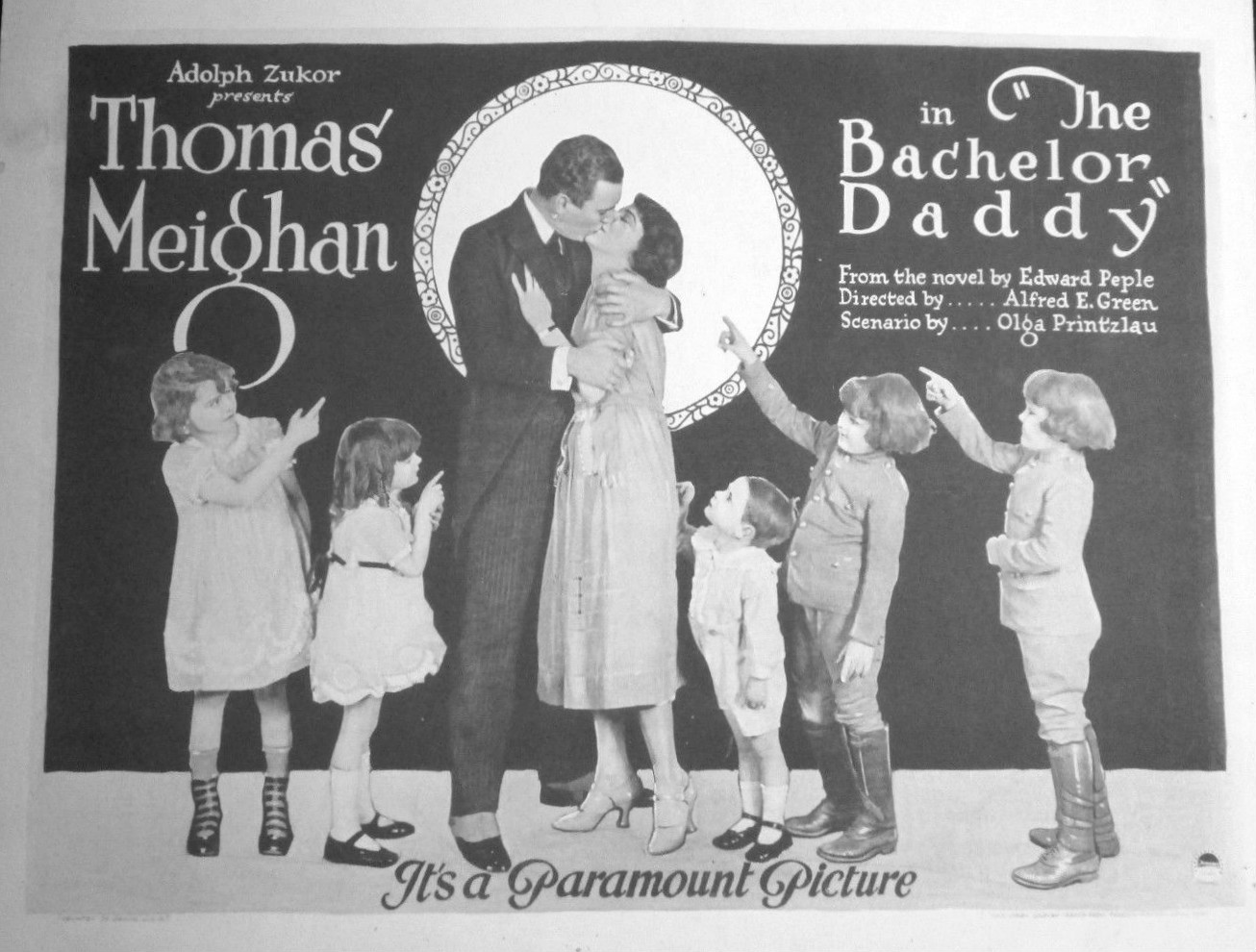
- Bruce Guerin, just to the right of Thomas Meighan and Leatrice Joy, lobby card for The Bachelor Daddy (1922)
- Born: January 18, 1919; Los Angeles, California, U.S.
- Died: June 27, 2012 (aged 93); Wailuku, U.S.
- Occupation: Child actor
- Years active: 1922–1925

Bruce Guerin (January 18, 1919 – June 27, 2012) was an American child actor known for his roles in silent films during the 1920s.

== Biography ==
Guerin was born in Los Angeles to a family that worked in showbusiness. His mother was a vaudeville performer while his father worked for Mack Sennett. Bruce started acting at age 3 when he appeared in Raoul Walsh's 1922 film Kindred of the Dust. This was followed by 12 more movies, including Brass, Drifting, Revelation, The Parasite and The Salvation Hunters.

During these three years, Bruce Guerin achieved media coverage from newspapers such as The Davenport Democrat and Leader, Modesto Evening News, Hamilton Daily News, Picture Play Magazine and Pharos-Tribune.

After his acting career had ended, he became a pianist. During the Second World War, he appeared in shows in Hawaii alongside celebrities such as Bob Hope and Ray Bolger. After the war ended, he continued to perform in various places.

Bruce Guerin retired in 1996 and died 16 years later, on June 27, 2012. He was 93 years old.

Bruce had four children: Paul Guerin, Mark Wilson, Bruce James Guerin Jr., and Lisa Guerin-Smeltzer. He had three grandchildren: Nick Johnson, Taylor Smeltzer, and Victoria Smeltzer.

== Bibliography ==
- John Holmstrom, The Moving Picture Boy: An International Encyclopaedia from 1895 to 1995, Norwich, Michael Russell, 1996, p. 90-91.
