= The Ghost of Rosy Taylor =

1918 film by Edward Sloman

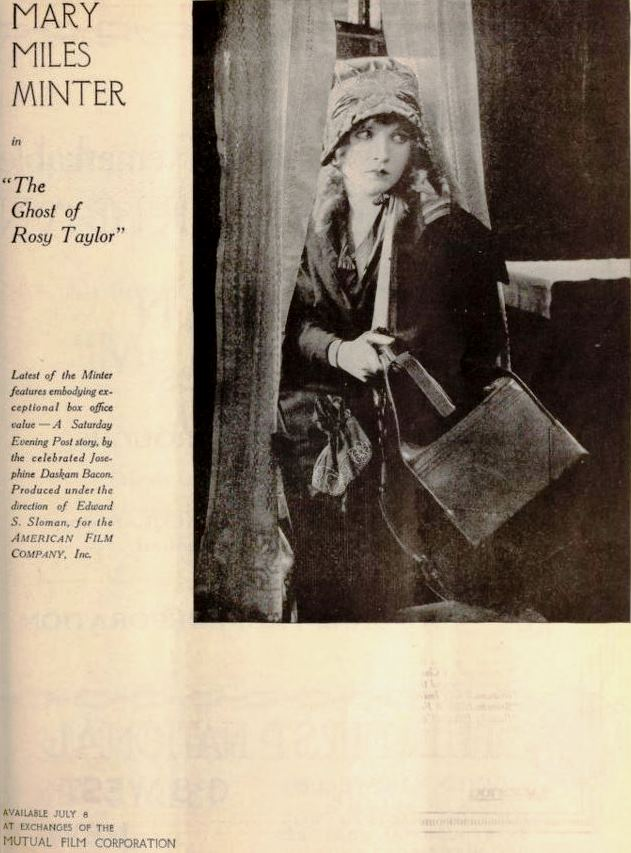
- The Ghost of Rosy Taylor (1918)
- Directed by: Edward Sloman
- Written by: Elizabeth Mahoney
- Based on: The Ghost of Rosy Taylor by Josephine Daskam Bacon
- Starring: Mary Miles Minter
- Production company: American Flying "A" studios
- Distributed by: Pathé Exchange
- Release date: July 8, 1918
- Running time: 5 reels
- Country: United States
- Language: Silent (English intertitles)

The Ghost of Rosy Taylor is a 1918 American silent comedy-drama film starring Mary Miles Minter and directed by Edward Sloman. The film is based on a Saturday Evening Post story of the same name, written by Josephine Daskam Bacon. It is one of approximately a dozen Minter films which are known to have survived - a print was found in New Zealand in the 1990s which is in possession of the BFI National Archive - and one of even fewer readily available for the general public to view.

== Plot ==
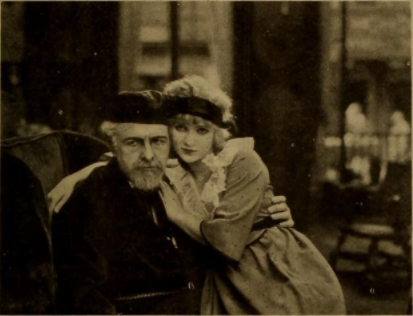
Mary Miles Minter and George Periolat in "The Ghost of Rosy Taylor" (1918)

In addition to being readily available to view, the plot of the film is summarised and reviewed in various film magazine articles.

Rhoda Eldridge Sayles is left a penniless orphan in Paris when her father dies and the shipping company in which he invested his money goes bust. She finds passage to America with a family looking for a nursemaid, but when they arrive in New York there is no place in their household for Rhoda, who finds herself alone with only seventeen dollars to her name.

She takes up residence in the New York boarding house of Mrs. Sullivan. After two weeks’ futile search for work, and down to her last ten cents, Rhoda finds a letter in a park, addressed to Rosy Taylor, and containing two dollars and the instruction to clean the mansion of Mrs. du Vivier every week. Rhoda tries to return the letter, but when she learns that Rosy Taylor is dead, she decides to take on the cleaning job herself.

All goes well until Mrs. Du Vivier’s brother, Jacques Le Clerc catches Rhoda in the act of cleaning the family silver. Believing that she is stealing the silver, he refers her to a reformatory, whose patron is Joseph Sayles. After being forced to stay and work at the reformatory by Mrs. Watkins who believes she is a thief, Rhoda escapes and, although afraid of another encounter with Jacques, returns to Rosy Taylor’s job as she needs the money.

When she returns to the Du Vivier mansion, Rhoda finds a letter from Mrs. Du Vivier, saying that she is pleased with the work, and some of her cast-off dresses for Rosy Taylor to wear. While wearing the dress, she is found by Jacques, who initially mistakes her for his sister. While Rhoda is explaining herself to Jacques, Mrs. Du Vivier meets her friend Mrs. Herriman-Smith and thanks her for her recommendation of Rosy Taylor. Mrs. Herriman-Smith tells her that Taylor has been dead for weeks. Wondering who has been cleaning the house all this time, the women race back to the Du Vivier mansion to investigate.

Jacques, meanwhile, when Rhoda shows him a letter of her father's with her full name, asks her to remain while he makes some enquiries. It is at this point what Mrs. Du Vivier and Mrs. Herriman-Smith arrive at the house, and mistake Rhoda cleaning with windows with a long mop as a ghostly apparition. They telephone the police, who arrive at the same moment as a worker from the reformatory seeking their escaped inmate, and Rhoda is taken into custody before Jacques can return.

After everyone comes together at the offices of the reformatory, Jacques and Rhoda are able to prove to Joseph Sayles, with the aid of her father’s letter, that Rhoda is his niece. Jacques introduces Rhoda to his sister as the ghost of Rosy Taylor, who, he says, “Will haunt me for the rest of my life.”

== Cast ==
- Mary Miles Minter as Rhoda Eldridge Sayles
- Allan Forrest as Jacques Le Clerc
- George Periolat as Charles Eldridge/Joseph Sayles
- Helen Howard as Mrs. Jeanne du Vivier
- Emma Kluge as Mrs. Herriman-Smith
- Kate Price as Mrs. Sullivan
- Anne Schaefer as Mrs. Marian Watkins

== Reception ==
Contemporary reviews of the film were mixed, with some critics praising the film as “exquisitely done” and the star and support as good, while others found the plot contrived but praised the personality of Minter.

== Critical assessment ==
Film historian Paul O’Dell offers this appraisal of The Ghost of Rosy Taylor:

The picture has quite unbelievable charm, and Mary Miles Minter makes us forgive her lack of acting talent, by the sheer beauty of her face. Edward Sloman’s direction is gentle and tender, as exemplified in the slow fades in and out as Rhoda tells in flashback her story to Jacques.

== Sources ==
- O’Dell, Paul (1970). Griffith and the Rise of Hollywood (1970 ed.). New York: A. S. Barnes & Co. p. 163. ISBN 0-498-07718-7.
