= The Snob (1924 film) =

1924 film by Monta Bell

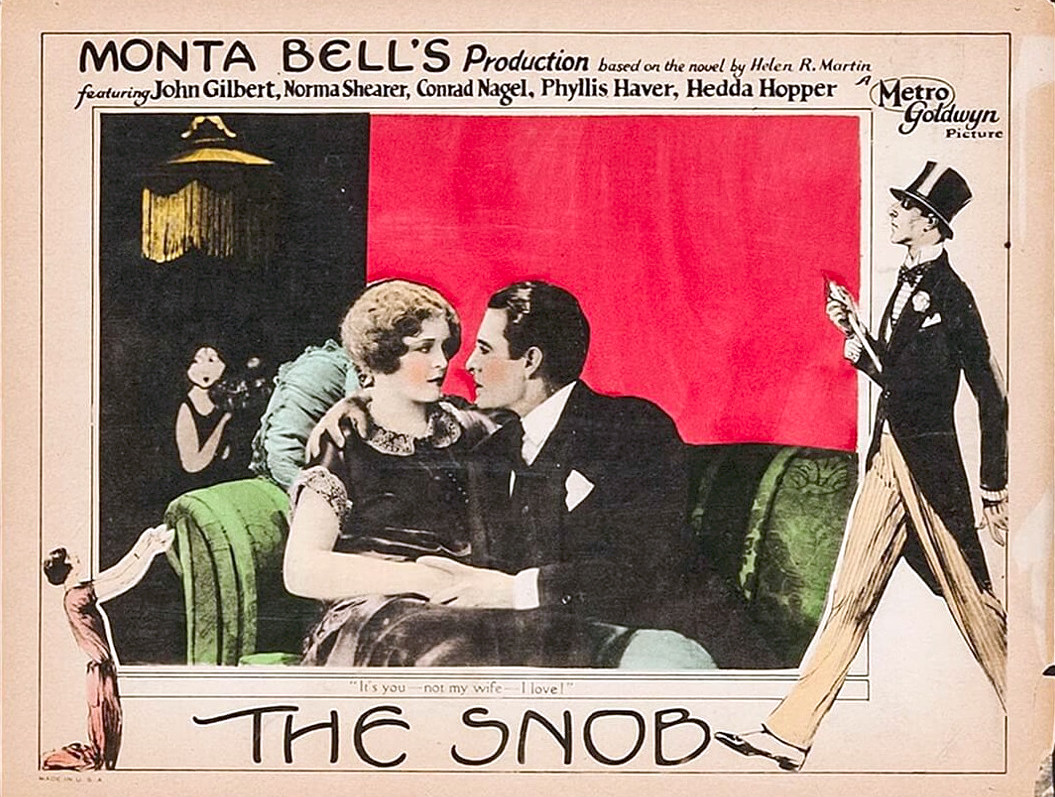
- Lobby card
- Directed by: Monta Bell
- Written by: Monta Bell
- Based on: The Snob: The Story of a Marriage by Helen Reimensnyder Martin
- Starring: John Gilbert; Norma Shearer; Conrad Nagel
- Cinematography: André Barlatier
- Edited by: Ralph Lawson
- Distributed by: Metro-Goldwyn-Mayer
- Release date: November 19, 1924 (United States)
- Running time: 70 minutes
- Country: United States
- Language: Silent (English intertitles)
- Budget: $100,000

The Snob is a 1924 American silent drama film directed by Monta Bell. The film starred Norma Shearer and John Gilbert (prior to their stardom), together with Phyllis Haver, Conrad Nagel, and Hedda Hopper. The film was written by Monta Bell, and was based on the novel The Snob: The Story of a Marriage by Helen Reimensnyder Martin.

== Plot ==
As described in a review in a film magazine, just as Nancy Claxton finished at a convent school, her wealthy father Sherwood is killed in a roadhouse brawl. Stung by the disgrace, she disappears and her sweetheart, Herrick, is unable to find her. Three years pass and Nancy is teaching school in the quaint Mennonite colony in Pennsylvania. She falls in love with an ambitious teacher, Eugene. They become engaged and Eugene gets a job as professor at an academy in a nearby town. He becomes popular and conceited, succeeds in winning favor of Dorothy, whose father owns the school. Eugene is made head-master. Nancy becomes ill and sends for Eugene. He marries her, believing she will die, but she gets well. He writes Dorothy a letter belittling Nancy. Herrick, who is teaching in the same school, visits Eugene and is amazed to find Nancy. Eugene continues to look down on Nancy and play up to Dorothy. Just before Nancy is to have a baby, he writes a loving letter to Dorothy. Nancy gets hold of this. Her baby dies. She then sees Eugene in his true light and shows him the newspaper story that she is heir to millions. He begs forgiveness but she taunts him as being a snob, saying she will divorce him and marry Herrick.

== Cast ==
- John Gilbert as Eugene Curry
- Norma Shearer as Nancy Claxton
- Conrad Nagel as Herrick Appleton
- Phyllis Haver as Dorothy Rensheimer
- Hedda Hopper as Mrs. Leiter
- Margaret Seddon as Mrs. Curry
- Aileen Manning as Lottie
- Hazel Kennedy as Florence
- Gordon Sackville as Sherwood Claxton
- Roy Laidlaw as Doctor
- Nellie Bly Baker as Maid

== Preservation ==
With no prints of The Snob located in any film archives, it is a lost film.
