= Kate L. McLaurin =

American writer

Kate L. McLaurin (1885-1933), Mrs. Frederick Calvin, was a writer in the United States. Several of her works were adapted into films. Her stories were published in various magazines including The Smart Set.

Born in Benton, Mississippi, her parents were William and Viola née Burrus McLaurin. She studied at the Anna Morgan School in Chicago, Illinois. She performed on stage prior to her marriage.

She married Frederick Calvin July 10, 1913 in New York. She lived in Sound Beach, Connecticut.

A reviewer described her play When We Are Young as sentimental rubbish.

== Writings ==
=== Books ===
- The Least Resistance (1916)

=== Stories ===
- "The Muffled Clock"
- "The Bleep of the Spinning Top" (1916)
- "The Eyes of Julia Deep" (1918)

== Theater ==
- The Six-Fifty
- When We Are Young (1920)
- Whispering Wires (1922) an adaptation of Henry Leverage's story
- Caught (1925)

== Filmography ==
- The Eyes of Julia Deep (1918)
- The Six-Fifty (1923)
- Whispering Wires (1926)
- Always Goodbye (1931)
