= Look Your Best =

1923 film

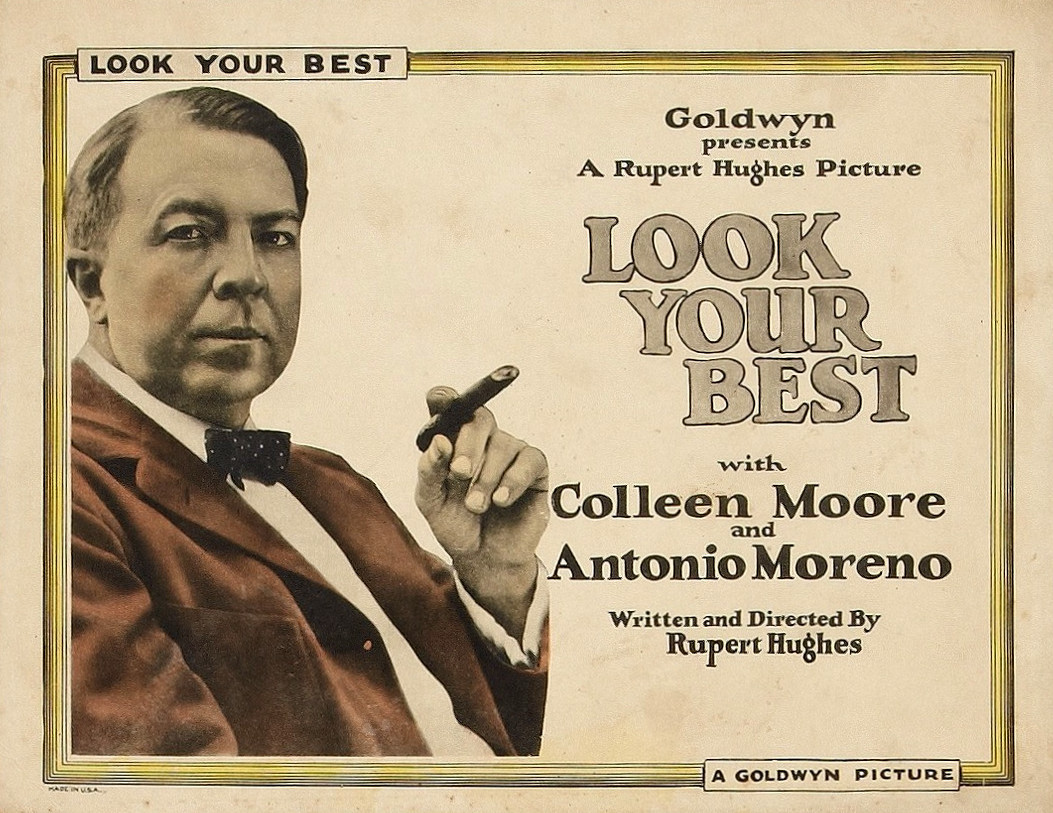
- Lobby card
- Directed by: Rupert Hughes
- Screenplay by: Rupert Hughes
- Story by: Rupert Hughes
- Cinematography: Norbert Brodin
- Production company: Goldwyn Pictures Corporation
- Distributed by: Goldwyn Distributing Company
- Release date: February 18, 1923 (U.S.)
- Running time: 6 reels
- Country: United States
- Language: Silent (English intertitles)

Look Your Best or The Bitterness of Sweets is a 1923 American comedy silent black and white film directed and written by Rupert Hughes. It stars Antonio Moreno and Colleen Moore.

== Plot ==
As described in a film magazine, young Italian woman Perla Quaranta dances in the streets to the music from her father's barrel organ. Her grace attracts the attention of Carlo Bruni, manager of a small theatrical troupe. He hires her to replace an actress who has grown overweight due to her overindulgence with food. Perla makes good with this chance, though she too gives into the temptation of pies, cakes, and other pastries. Carlo is also given into overeating, with his figure suffering and his dancing powers impaired. Perla begins to take on weight, just like her predecessor. She repulses an attempt by a stage hand, Krug, to court her. In revenge, he tampers with the wire used by Perla when performing her butterfly act. Carlo suspects Krug and thrashes him. Carlo then receives a sentence of thirty days in jail for this assault. Meanwhile, Perla, in her convalescence, is almost won by a baker who describes the tempting pastries he makes. When Carlo returns after serving his sentence, he and Perla resolve to diet steadily and win fame as dancers. They do so and are married into the bargain.

== Cast ==
- Colleen Moore as Perla Quaranta
- Antonio Moreno as Carlo Bruni
- William Orlamond as Pietro
- Orpha Alba as Nella
- Earl Metcalfe as Krug
- Martha Mattox as Mrs. Blitz
- Francis McDonald as Alberto Cabotto

== Preservation ==
No copies of Look Your Best are listed in any film archives, making this a lost film.
