= The Mate of the Sally Ann =

1917 film by Henry King

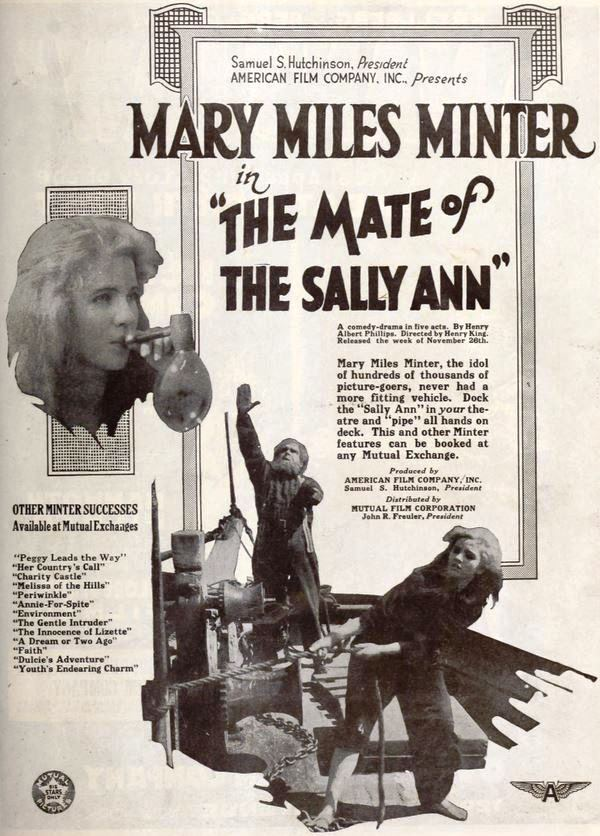
- Advertisement for film
- Directed by: Henry King
- Written by: Elizabeth Mahoney (scenario)
- Story by: Henry Albert Phillips
- Starring: Mary Miles Minter
- Cinematography: John F. Seitz
- Production company: American Film Company
- Distributed by: Mutual Film
- Release date: November 26, 1917 (United States)
- Running time: 5 reels
- Country: United States
- Language: Silent (English intertitles)

The Mate of the Sally Ann (also known as Peggy Rebels) is a 1917 American silent comedy-drama film directed by Henry King and starring Mary Miles Minter. As with many of Minter's features, it is thought to be a lost film.

Some scenes were shot in San Francisco.

== Plot ==
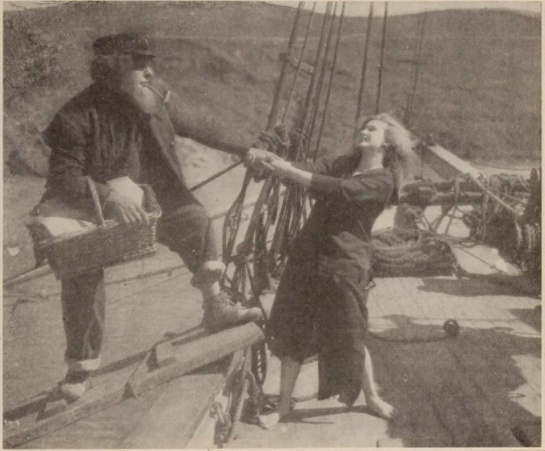
Mary Miles Minter and George Periolat in "The Mate of the Sally Ann" (1917)

As described in various film magazine reviews, Sally lives with her grandfather Captain Ward on an old, beached schooner. Her mother died giving birth to her, without revealing the father, and her grandfather has vowed revenge on the man that he believes despoiled his daughter. In the meantime, he keeps his granddaughter isolated on the schooner, fulfilling all of the roles of the ship's "crew."

One day, when playing on the beach, Sally finds a stray dog. When the dog runs away, Sally follows it, and ends up at the lavish home of its master, Judge Gordon. Gordon is very taken with Sally; he insists that she keeps the dog and that she comes to visit again. When she does, she meets Judge Gordon's friend Hugh Schuyler, who is visiting to study law. Romance blossoms between them, until Captain Ward happens upon one of their meetings and chases Schuyler away.

Captain Ward tries to confine Sally to the schooner, but when Judge Ward sends her an invitation to a party, she sneaks out. The judge provides her with a beautiful dress and shoes for the first time, but the Captain, discovering her absence and the invitation, storms into the party and drags her back to the ship.

Judge Gordon meanwhile, having seen Sally in fine clothes, is struck by the resemblance between her and his lost wife. He goes to see Captain Ward to enquire about Sally's parentage, but the Captain attacks him. Sally intervenes, and is knocked unconscious by a blow. When she comes round she finds out that Judge Gordon is her father, who had secretly married her mother but then lost touch with her after illness and a miscarriage of letters. All is forgiven between the Judge and Captain, and Sally becomes the mistress of a fine new yacht and the fiancée of Hugh Schuyler.

== Cast ==
- Mary Miles Minter as Sally Ann
- Allan Forrest as Hugh Schuyler
- George Periolat as Captain Ward
- Jack Connolly as Judge Gordon
- Adele Farrington as Mrs. Schuyler
