= The Parasite (1925 film) =

1925 film by Louis J. Gasnier

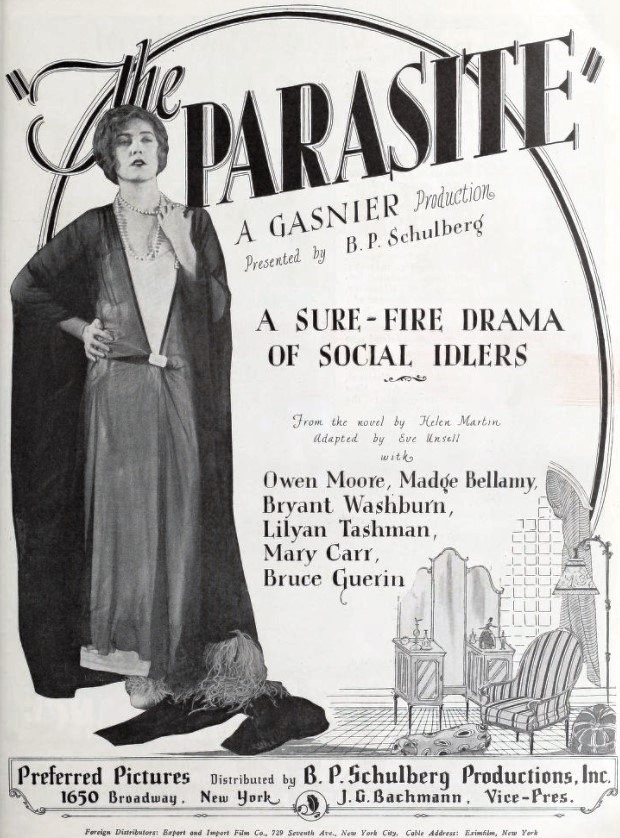
- Advertisement
- Directed by: Louis J. Gasnier
- Written by: Eve Unsell (scenario)
- Based on: The Parasite by Helen Reimensnyder Martin
- Produced by: B. P. Schulberg
- Starring: Owen Moore; Madge Bellamy
- Cinematography: Joseph Goodrich
- Distributed by: Preferred Pictures
- Release date: January 20, 1925
- Running time: 6 reels; 5,140 feet
- Country: United States
- Language: Silent (English intertitles)

The Parasite is a 1925 American silent society drama film produced by B. P. Schulberg, and distributed by Al Lichtman and Preferred Pictures. The film was based on the 1913 novel The Parasite by Helen Reimensnyder Martin. It starred Owen Moore, Madge Bellamy, and Mary Carr.

== Plot ==
As described in a review in a film magazine, Laura Randall, the divorced wife of Arthur Randall, tries to win him back when he becomes prominent. She especially hates Joan Laird, whom she calls a parasite because she imposes on her friends. Joan does this because her of her mother's pride which prevents her from earning her living. Arthur's son Bertie becomes ill and insists that Joan remain with him, so Arthur takes her and her mother to her home. Although Laura shrinks away from the boy when she thinks he has smallpox, she persists in trying to win Arthur back. Arthur sees Joan with her friend Doctor Brooks and begins to believe that she may be an adventuress. Laura kidnaps the boy and Joan follows. Laura and Doctor Brooks are killed in an automobile accident out in the country, but Joan finds the boy. Because she has injured her foot, she is unable to go for aid. To prevent the boy from starving, Joan cuts her arm so that her blood can sustain the boy. Arthur finds them and realizes by her sacrifice that her character is true blue. Soon after, Joan and Arthur are married.

== Cast ==
- Owen Moore as Arthur Randall
- Madge Bellamy as Joan Laird
- Bryant Washburn as Doctor Brooks
- Mary Carr as Mrs. Laird
- Lilyan Tashman as Laura Randall
- Bruce Guerin as Bertie
- Dorothy Dwan as Bit Role (uncredited)

== Preservation ==
A print of The Parasite is in the collection of the Library of Congress.
