= The Six-Fifty =

1923 film by Nat Ross

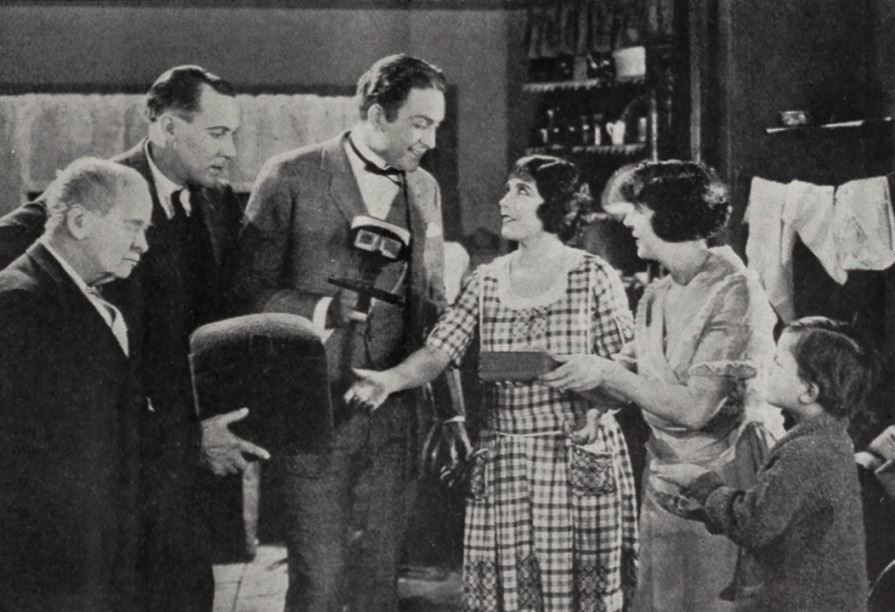
- Film still
- Directed by: Nat Ross
- Written by: Doris Schroeder; Harvey Gates; Lenore J. Coffee
- Based on: The Six-Fifty by Kate L. McLaurin
- Produced by: Carl Laemmle
- Starring: Renée Adorée
- Cinematography: Ben Kline
- Distributed by: Universal Pictures
- Release date: October 8, 1923
- Running time: 5 reels
- Country: United States
- Language: Silent (English intertitles)

The Six-Fifty is a lost 1923 American silent drama film directed by Nat Ross starring Renée Adorée. Based upon the 1921 play of the same name, it was produced then released by Universal Pictures.

== Cast ==
- Renée Adorée as Hester Taylor
- Orville Caldwell as Dan Taylor
- Bert Woodruff as Gramp
- Gertrude Astor as Christine Palmer
- Niles Welch as Mark Rutherford

== Preservation ==
With no holdings located in archives, The Six-Fifty is considered a lost film.

== See also ==
- Gertrude Astor filmography
