= The New Teacher (1922 film) =

1922 silent film

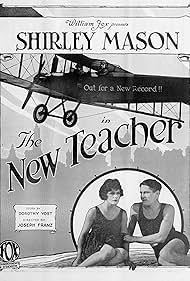
- Directed by: Joseph Franz
- Written by: Dorothy Yost
- Produced by: William Fox
- Starring: Shirley Mason; Allan Forrest; Earl Metcalfe
- Cinematography: Frank B. Good
- Production company: Fox Film
- Distributed by: Fox Film
- Release date: August 20, 1922
- Running time: 50 minutes
- Country: United States
- Languages: Silent; English intertitles

The New Teacher is a 1922 American silent drama film directed by Joseph Franz and starring Shirley Mason, Allan Forrest and Earl Metcalfe.

== Cast ==
- Shirley Mason as Constance Bailey
- Allan Forrest as Bruce Van Griff
- Earl Metcalfe as Edward Hurley
- Otto Hoffman as Joseph Hurley
- Olah Norman as Mrs. Brissell
- Pat Moore as George Brissell
- Kate Price as Mrs. Brennan

== Bibliography ==
- Munden, Kenneth White. The American Film Institute Catalog of Motion Pictures Produced in the United States, Part 1. University of California Press, 1997.
