= Andrew Arbuckle (actor) =

American actor (1887–1938)

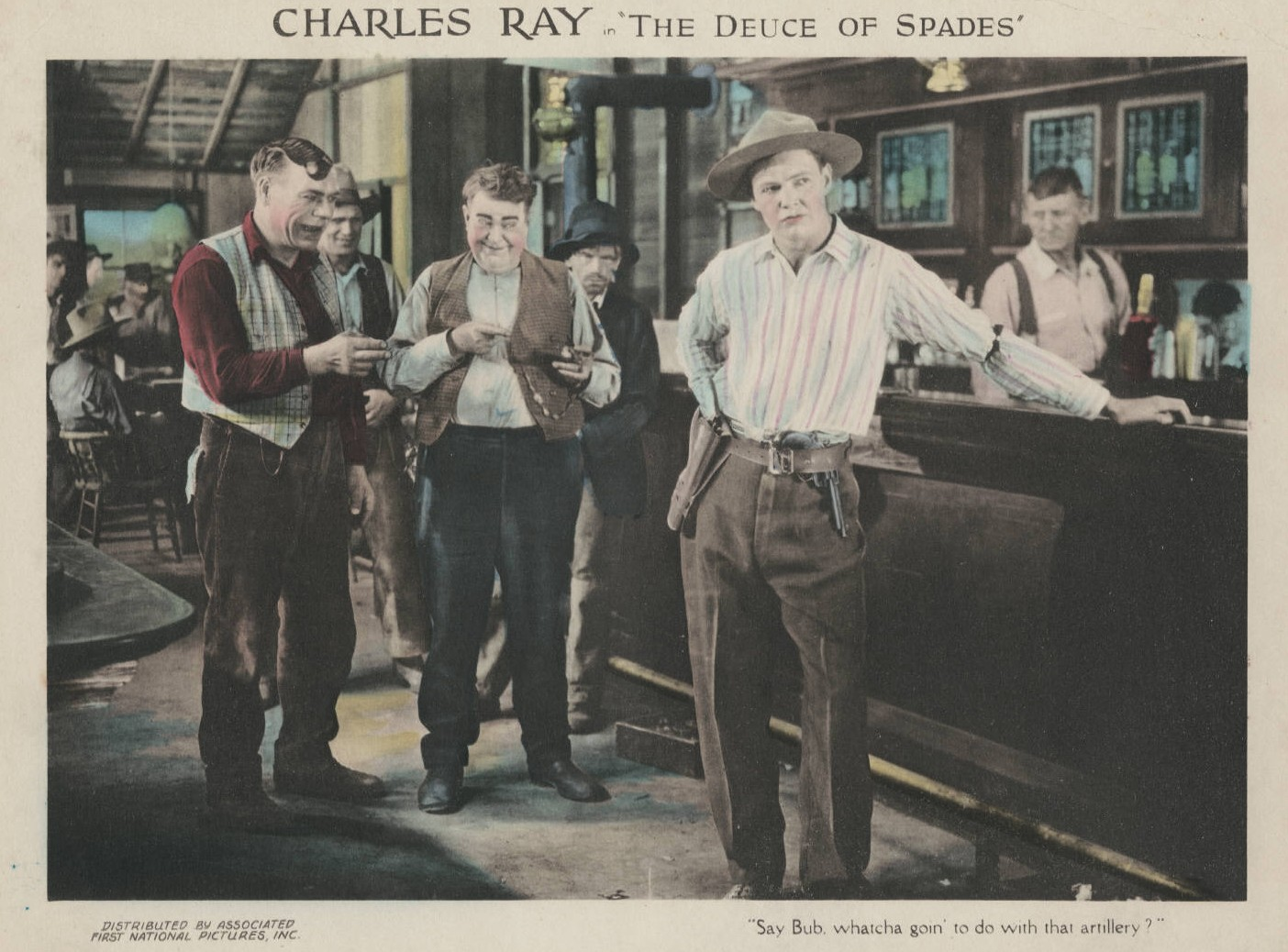
- Lobby card showing Arbuckle (center) in The Deuce of Spades (1922)
- Born: September 5, 1887; Galveston, Texas, U.S.
- Died: September 21, 1938 (aged 51); Los Angeles, California, U.S.
- Spouse: Blanche Duquesne (m. 1915)
- Relatives: Maclyn Arbuckle (brother); Roscoe "Fatty" Arbuckle (cousin)

Andrew Arbuckle (September 5, 1887 – September 21, 1938) was an American stage and film actor. He was the brother of Maclyn Arbuckle and cousin of Roscoe "Fatty" Arbuckle.

== Early life ==
Arbuckle was born in Galveston, Texas, to a family of Scottish descent. His older brother Maclyn was also an actor.

== Career ==
Arbuckle was described as "a fat man of the first rank, and proud of it." He made his film debut in Little Mary Sunshine (1916), playing Bob's father. He went uncredited in ten of his 44 films, including his last appearance, in the 1935 film The Dark Angel, in the role of Mr. Gallop.

He is known for his appearances in The Girl That Didn't Care (1916) with Margaret Landis, The Matrimonial Martyr (1916) with Ruth Roland, Peggy Leads the Way (1917), and Happiness (1917) and Naughty, Naughty! (1918), both with Enid Bennett.

== Personal life ==
Arbuckle married Blanche Duquesne, an opera singer also known as Irma Guthrie Wright, in October 1915. He was severely beaten at a party in West Hollywood in 1931. He died on September 21, 1938, in Los Angeles, aged 51, of a suspected heart attack, as had his cousin, Roscoe, in 1933. Andrew Arbuckle was buried in an unmarked grave at Hollywood Memorial Park Cemetery Garden of Ancestors.

== Filmography ==
- Graft (1915)
- The Red Circle (1915)
- The Heart Breakers (1916)
- Little Mary Sunshine (1916) – Bob's Father
- The Girl That Didn't Care (1916)
- The Matrimonial Martyr (1916) – Prof. Stanley
- A Lucky Leap (1916)
- A Soul at Stake (1916)
- A Plumber's Waterloo (1916)
- Big Tremaine (1916) – Samuel Leavitt
- Should She Obey? (1917) – Uncle John
- Happiness (1917) – Nicodemus
- Peggy Leads the Way (1917) – H.E. Manners
- Naughty, Naughty! (1918) – Adam Miller
- The Family Skeleton (1918) – Dr. Griggs
- Confession (1918) – The governor
- His Own Home Town (1918) – Rev. John Duncan
- Denny from Ireland (1918) – Priest
- A Romance of Happy Valley (1919) – Clergyman
- The Love Hunger (1919) – Bob Clinton
- Common Clay (1919) – Mr. Neal
- A White Man's Chance (1919) – Valentino
- The Hoodlum (1919) – Pat O'Shaughnessy
- John Petticoats (1919) – Rameses
- Pinto (1920) – Guardian
- Darling Mine (1920)
- Unseen Forces (1920) – Mr. Leslie
- The Son of Wallingford (1921) – Talbot Curtis
- Mother o' Mine (1921) – Henry Godfrey
- Say Uncle (1921)
- The Light in the Clearing (1921) – Horace Dunkelberg
- The Deuce of Spades (1922) – Fat Ed
- Caught Bluffing (1922) – Ham Thomas
- Saved by Radio (1922) – Pat
- Quincy Adams Sawyer (1922)
- The Spider and the Rose (1923) – The Priest
- Name the Man (1924) – Vondy
- The Dangerous Coward (1924) – David McGuinn
- The Clean Heart (1924) – Bickers
- The Fighting Boob (1926) – Old Man Hawksby
- Hazardous Valley (1927)
- Jazz Mad (1928) – Schmidt
- Ex-Rooster (1932)
- The Dark Angel (Uncredited, 1935) – Mr. Gallop
