= Cheated Love =

1921 silent film

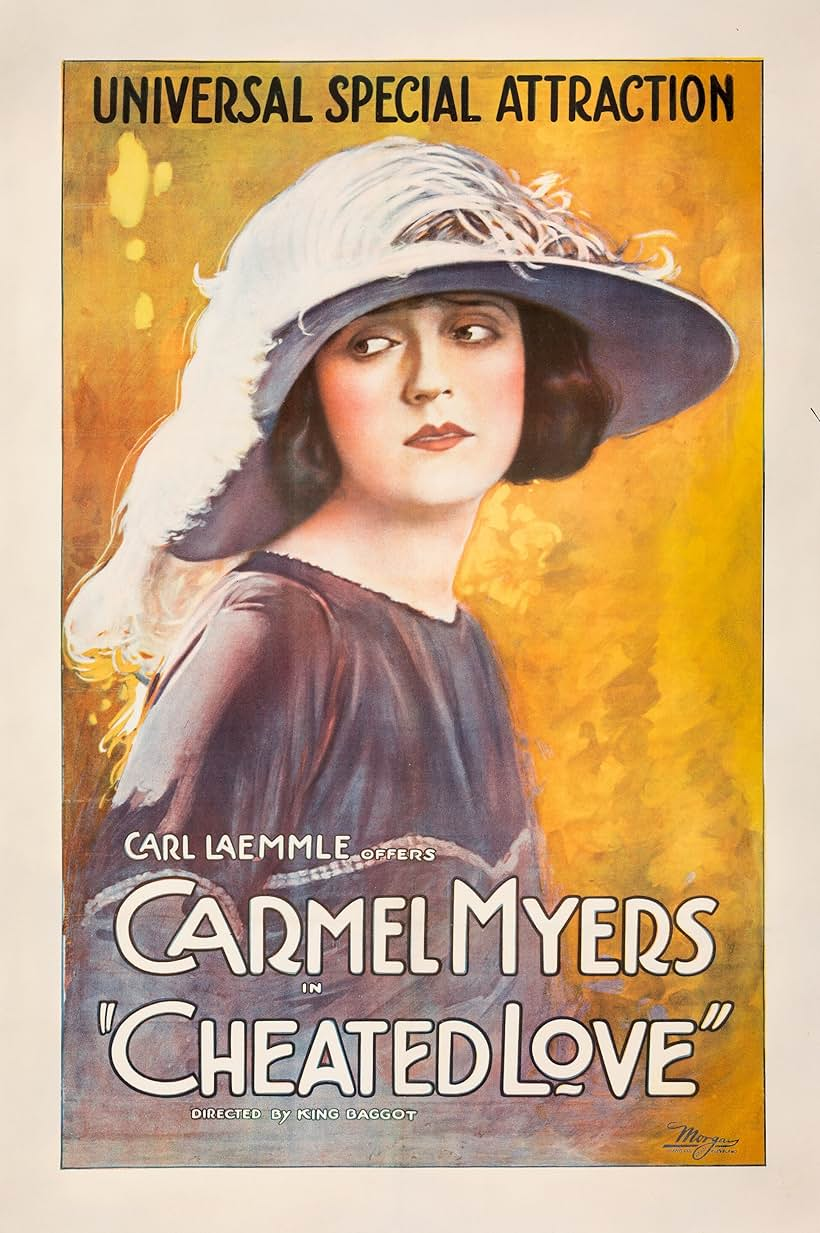
- Directed by: King Baggot
- Written by: Lucien Hubbard; Sonya Levien; Doris Schroeder
- Starring: Carmel Myers; George B. Williams; Allan Forrest
- Cinematography: Bert Glennon
- Production company: Universal Pictures
- Distributed by: Universal Pictures
- Release date: May 16, 1921
- Running time: 50 minutes
- Country: United States
- Languages: Silent; English intertitles

Cheated Love is a 1921 American silent drama film directed by King Baggot and starring Carmel Myers, George B. Williams and Allan Forrest.

== Cast ==
- Carmel Myers as Sonya Schonema
- George B. Williams as Abraham Schonema
- Allan Forrest as David Dahlman
- John Davidson as Mischa Grossman
- Ed Brady as Scholom Maruch
- Snitz Edwards as Bernie
- Bowditch M. Turner as Toscha
- Virginia Harris as Sophia Kettel
- Inez Gomez as Rose Jacobs
- Clara Greenwood as Mrs. Breine
- Meyer Ouhayou as Sam Lupsey
- Laura Pollard as Mrs. Flaherty
- Rose Dione as Madame Yazurka
- Theresa Gray as Mrs. Leshinsky
- Fred Becker as Charles Hensley

== Bibliography ==
- Munden, Kenneth White. The American Film Institute Catalog of Motion Pictures Produced in the United States, Part 1. University of California Press, 1997.
