= Naughty, Naughty! (1918 film) =

- Directed by: Jerome Storm
- Written by: C. Gardner Sullivan
- Produced by: Thomas H. Ince
- Starring: Enid Bennett
- Cinematography: John Stumar
- Production company: Thomas H. Ince Corporation
- Distributed by: Paramount Pictures
- Release date: March 1918
- Running time: 5 reels (approximately 50 minutes)
- Country: United States
- Language: Silent (English intertitles)

Naughty, Naughty! is a 1918 American silent comedy film starring Enid Bennett and written by C. Gardner Sullivan. The film's protagonist is Roberta Miller, an innocent girl who leaves her rural hometown for the big city. She returns after four months, but her sophistication draws suspicion in her hometown.

== Plot ==
As described in a film magazine, Roberta Miller returns to Lilyville, Kansas, after spending one season in New York City and finds things dull. Her many trunks, bulldog, and much finery cause the gossips' tongues to wag and she finally brings down the wrath of the church-going populous when she presents a "Symphony of Spring" at a bazaar in the town hall that consists of a nature dance with music and little clothing. The town is divided on the question of dancing thereafter and she proceeds to convert the "antis" by luring an innocent young woman to a nearby town's dance hall, intending to leave her there while informing the church people. However, at the dance hall she discovers a church trustee and changes her plan. On the recommendation of the trustee and the editor of the local paper, Matthew Sampson, the church votes to have dancing to save the young people from temptation. Roberta, out of gratitude, agrees to marry the newspaper editor.

== Cast ==
- Enid Bennett as Roberta Miller
- Earle Rodney as Matthew Sampson
- Marjorie Bennett as Prudence Sampson
- Gloria Hope as Judith Holmes
- Andrew Arbuckle as Adam Miller
