= Peggy Leads the Way =

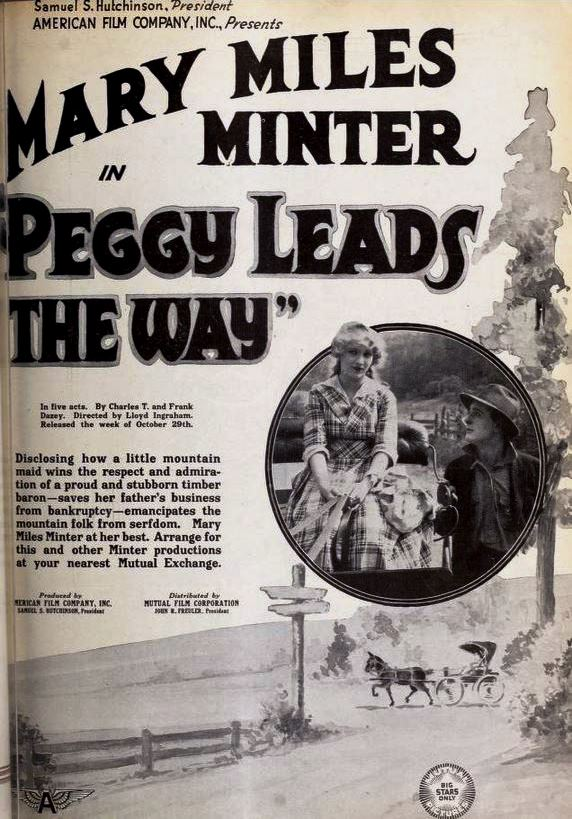
- Advertisement with Mary Miles Minter and Allan Forrest
- Directed by: Lloyd Ingraham
- Written by: Charles T. Dazey; Frank Mitchell Dazey; Elizabeth Mahoney (uncredited)
- Starring: Mary Miles Minter
- Production company: American Film Company
- Distributed by: Mutual Film
- Release date: October 29, 1917 (U.S.)
- Running time: 5 reels
- Country: United States
- Language: Silent (English intertitles)

Peggy Leads the Way is a 1917 American silent drama film directed by Lloyd Ingraham and starring Mary Miles Minter. It also features Andrew Arbuckle, Carl Stockdale, Allan Forrest, Emma Kluge, and Margaret Shelby, who is Minter's older sister. It is one of approximately a dozen of Minter's films to have survived, a copy having first been found at the Dutch Filmmuseum. It was sold to the American Film Institute in 1991 and is held at the UCLA Film and Television Archive.

== Plot ==
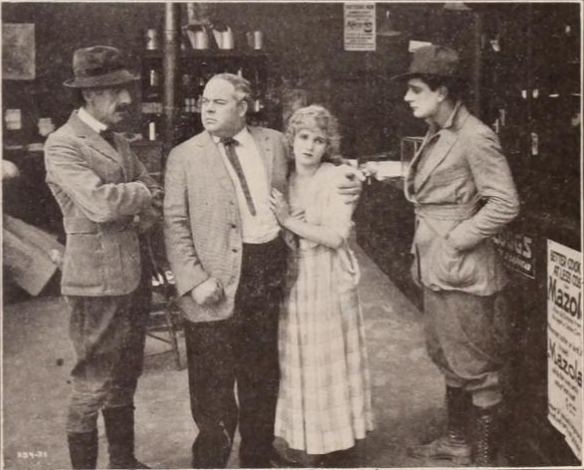
A scene from "Peggy Leads the Way" (1917)

As described in various film magazine reviews, after years away at a fashionable boarding school in the East, Peggy decides to surprise her father one summer by taking a trip back home. She has assumed from her lavish education that her father is a prosperous and successful merchant; she is shocked to find him the owner of a run-down country store that barely turns a profit.

Peggy quickly takes charge, spruces things up, and in no time she has the store making money. Meanwhile, local landowner Roland Gardiner is buying up vast tracts of the local forest with the intention of running a game preserve. He closes the mountain road, angering the local people who have been accustomed to hunting and fishing on the land, but in response to their protests, he says of the land "I bought it, and I can do what I please with it." His son Clyde is more amenable to the villagers, and has taken a liking to Peggy, which is reciprocated, but his father considers a store-keeper's daughter to be far beneath his son.

Gardiner invites guests to visit, a wealthy woman and her daughter Maude, whom he considers to be a more suitable match for his son. During their stay, the villagers decide to burn the Gardiner home, but Peggy talks them out of it. The same night, however, a storm hits the mountain, flooding the Gardiner home and leaving them without food, fuel or servants.

With no alternative if he wants to feed his guests, Roland Gardiner goes to Peggy's store for provisions, where he finds his son happily sweeping the floor in exchange for a hot breakfast. When he tries to buy cheese, ham and crackers, Peggy charges him over one thousand dollars; in response to his protests she tells him "we bought it, and we can do what we please with it."

Returning to his damp home with his overpriced food, Gardiner realises that no-one is able to cook it. Mrs. Greenwood and her daughter leave in a huff, and Gardiner returns to the store, having decided that Peggy might just be the right girl for his son after all.

== Cast ==
- Mary Miles Minter - Peggy Manners
- Andrew Arbuckle - H.E. Manners
- Carl Stockdale - Roland Gardiner
- Allan Forrest - Clyde Gardiner
- Emma Kluge - Mrs. Greenwood
- Margaret Shelby - Maude Greenwood
- George Ahearn - Tim Martin
- Frank Thompson - Bob Huckins
- William Spencer - Pop Hicks
- Mabel Taliaferro - Unidentified role
