= Elizabeth Mahoney =

American screenwriter

- Born: November 1879; Elma, Iowa, USA
- Died: ?? ??
- Occupation: Screenwriter

Elizabeth "Lizzie" Mahoney was an American screenwriter active during Hollywood's silent era. She also was in charge of continuity in a number of other films during her time in the industry. She worked primarily at the American Film Company (based in Santa Barbara, California) and Essanay, frequently collaborating with screenwriter June Mathis as well as director Lloyd Ingraham.

== Biography ==
Mahoney was born to Daniel Mahoney and Ellen Kane in Elma, Iowa, where she grew up on a farm; she also spent time in Chicago. By the early 1910s, she had moved to Hollywood, where she worked as a stenographer before breaking into the film industry as a screenwriter. Her first known screenwriting assignment involved adapting Charles Thomas Dazey's story into the 1917 silent drama Peggy Leads the Way, directed by Ingraham and shot on location at Ben Lomond near Santa Cruz, California. She continued writing through around 1920, at which point she was residing in Hollywood. Little is known of what happened to her after that date.

== Selected works ==
Screenplays:

- The Golden Trail (1920)
- Fair Enough (1918)
- The Eyes of Julia Deep (1918)
- Impossible Susan (1918)
- The Ghost of Rosy Taylor (1918)
- The Square Deal (1918)
- Ann's Finish (1918)
- Jilted Janet (1918)
- Beauty and the Rogue (1918)
- Up Romance Road (1918) (uncredited)
- The Mate of the Sally Ann (1917)
- A Limb of Satan (1917) (short)
- The Calendar Girl (1917) (uncredited)
- Peggy Leads the Way (1917) (uncredited)
