= The Heart Specialist (1922 film) =

1922 film by Frank John Urson

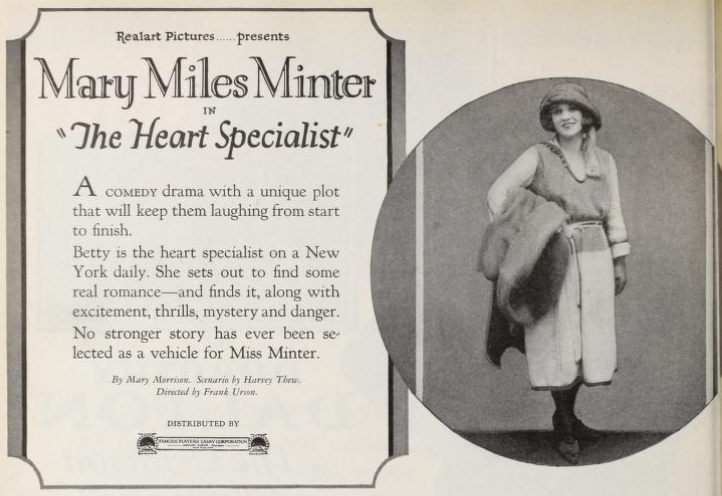
- Mary Miles Minter in The Heart Specialist
- Directed by: Frank Urson
- Written by: Harvey Thew
- Story by: Mary Morrison
- Starring: Mary Miles Minter
- Cinematography: Allen M. Davey
- Production company: Realart Pictures Corporation
- Distributed by: Paramount Pictures
- Release date: April 9, 1922
- Running time: 5 reels
- Country: United States
- Language: Silent (English intertitles)

The Heart Specialist is a 1922 American silent romantic comedy film directed by Frank Urson and starring Mary Miles Minter and Allan Forrest. It was adapted by Harvey Thew from a story by Mary Morrison. As with many of Minter's features, it is thought to be a lost film.

== Plot ==
As described in various film magazine reviews, Rosalie Beckwith works for a New York newspaper, editing a column devoted to romance. When her editor threatens to dismiss her on the grounds that romance does not exist, Rosalie bets her job that she can find romance within forty miles of the newspaper office.

Arriving at a small town chosen at random, Rosalie is mistaken for Muriel Murat Bey, the cousin and heir of Bob Stratton, a wealthy but wounded and ailing war veteran. Accepting this misidentification, Rosalie moves in to Stratton's estate, where she rapidly falls for the wounded veteran, and also incurs the enmity of family physician Dr. Fitch. Fitch has been systematically embezzling Stratton's funds and now, fearing discovery, he plots to kill him.

When Rosalie discovers that Fitch is attempting to poison Stratton, Fitch decides to dispose of her. He throws her down a well, and introduces his sister Grace as the "real" Muriel Murat Bey. Rosalie however escapes from the well, and before Stratton can eat the poisoned food that Fitch has prepared for him, she reveals the plot. The Fitches are arrested, and, although she has won her wager along with Stratton's heart, Rosalie chooses to leave her newspaper column behind for a real romance with Stratton.

== Cast ==
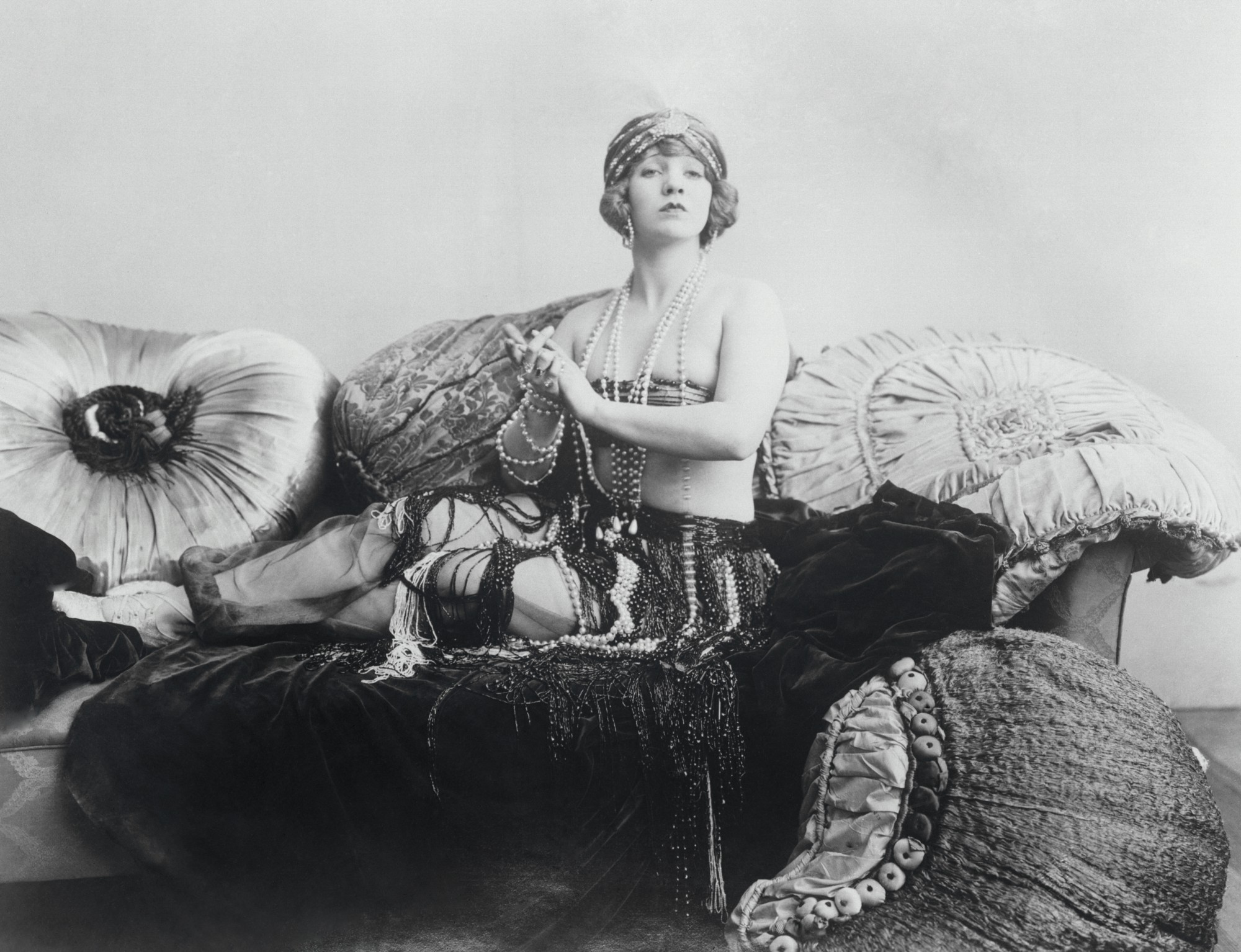
Mary Miles Minter in "The Heart Specialist" (1922)

- Mary Miles Minter as Rosalie Beckwith
- Allan Forrest as Bob Stratton
- Roy Atwell as Winston Gates
- Jack Mathis as City Editor
- Noah Beery as Dr. Thomas Fitch
- James Neill as Fernald
- Carmen Phillips as Grace Fitch
