= Beauty and the Rogue =

1918 film by Henry King

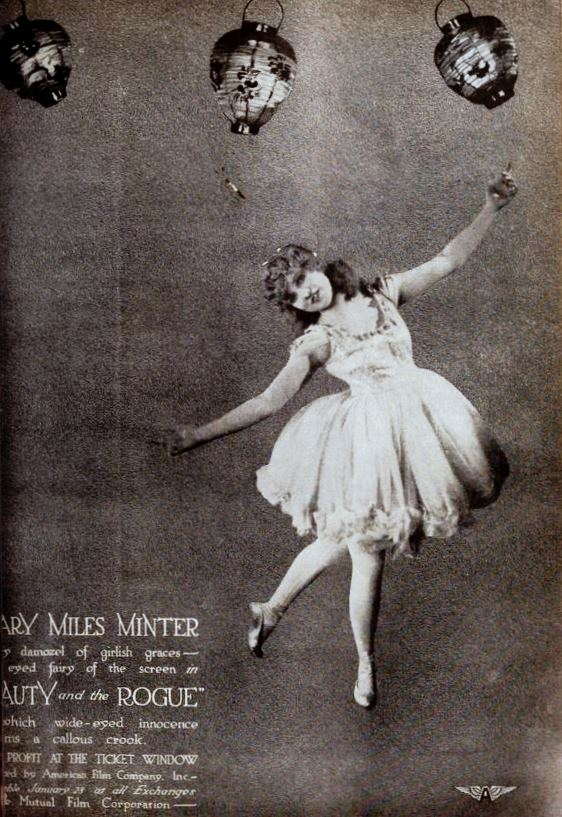
- Advertisement for film
- Directed by: Henry King
- Written by: Elizabeth Mahoney (scenario)
- Story by: Arthur Berthelet
- Starring: Mary Miles Minter
- Cinematography: John F. Seitz
- Production company: American Film Company
- Distributed by: Mutual Film
- Release date: January 29, 1918
- Running time: 5 reels
- Country: United States
- Language: Silent (English intertitles)

Beauty and the Rogue is a 1918 American silent comedy crime drama film directed by Henry King and starring Mary Miles Minter. It was filmed under the working title of "Mademoiselle Tiptoe," based on a story by Arthur Berthelet and adapted for the screen by Elizabeth Mahoney, who was the screenwriter for many of Minter's Mutual Film features. As with many of Minter's features, it is thought to be a lost film.

== Plot ==
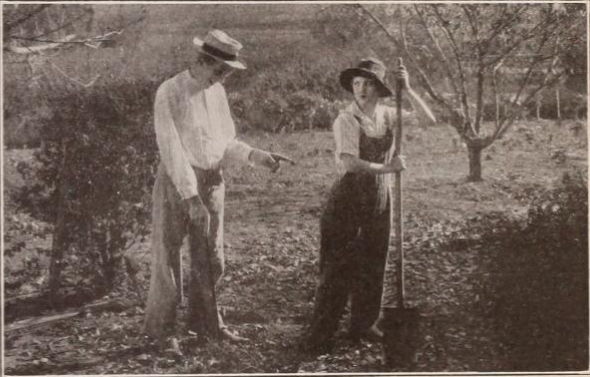
Mary Miles Minter in "Beauty and the Rogue" (1918)

As described in various film magazine reviews, Roberta "Bobby" Lee is a wealthy and optimistic girl who believes in prison uplift work. She persuades her father Thomas to take ex-convict "Slippery" Bill Dorgan into his employ as a gardener. The same night that Roberta leaves for a vacation on a country ranch, Dorgan steals her jewellery and runs away.

While working on the ranch, Roberta meets Richard "Dick" Van Stone, who initially thinks she is a boy as she is dressed in boy's overalls. Once he realises the truth, a romance develops between them. Seeking a gift for Roberta, he buys a brooch from "Slippery" Bill, who has travelled to the area and is selling Roberta's jewellery in order to buy food.

At a local charity event, Roberta performs a ballet-style dance billed as "Mademoiselle Tiptoe." Afterward, Van Stone presents her with the brooch, which she immediately recognises as one of her own. Believing Van Stone to have stolen from her, Roberta immediately has him arrested, although he protests his innocence and tells her that he bought the brooch from a tramp.

The truth is revealed when "Slippery" Bill is caught up in a plot to kidnap Roberta for a ransom and is arrested. Roberta finds out that Van Stone is not only innocent, but is also her father's new general manager, and the two announce their engagement.

== Cast ==
- Mary Miles Minter as Roberta Lee
- Allan Forrest as Richard Van Stone
- Orral Humphrey as 'Slippery' Bill Dorgan
- George Periolat as Thomas Lee
- Lucille Ward as Sarah Wilson
- Spottiswoode Aitken as Benjamin Wilson
- Clarence Burton as Detective Callahan
