= While Justice Waits =

1922 film

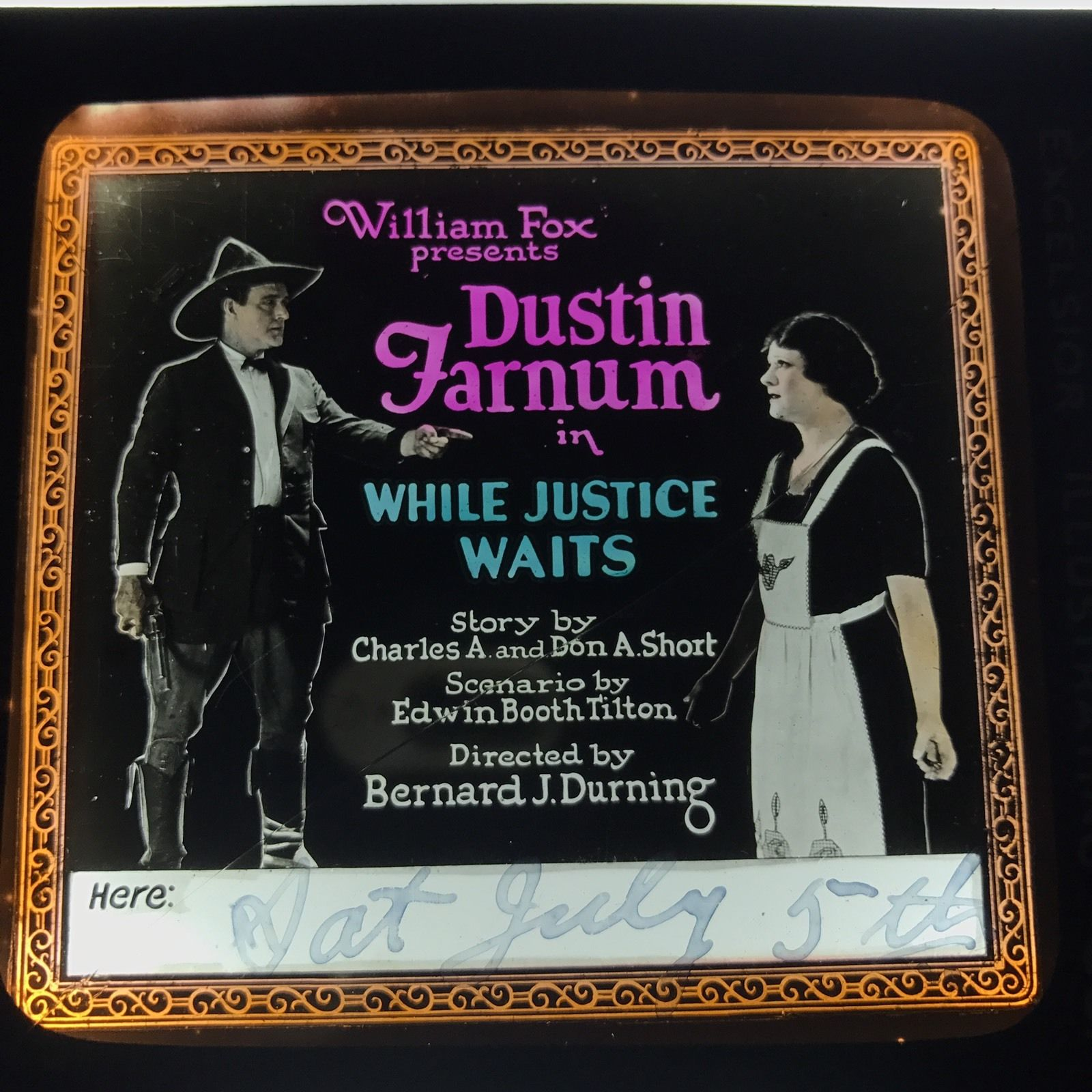
- Lantern slide.
- Directed by: Bernard J. Durning
- Written by: Charles A. Short; Don Short; John Stone; Edwin B. Tilton
- Starring: Dustin Farnum; Irene Rich; Earl Metcalfe; Junior Delameter; Frankie Lee
- Cinematography: Don Short
- Production company: Fox Film Corporation
- Distributed by: Fox Film Corporation
- Release date: November 19, 1922
- Running time: 50 minutes
- Country: United States
- Languages: Silent; English intertitles

While Justice Waits is a 1922 American silent Western film directed by Bernard J. Durning, and starring Dustin Farnum, Irene Rich, Earl Metcalfe, Junior Delameter, and Frankie Lee. The film was released by Fox Film Corporation on November 19, 1922.

== Cast ==
- Dustin Farnum as Dan Hunt
- Irene Rich as Nell Hunt
- Earl Metcalfe as George Carter
- Junior Delameter as Hunt Jr.
- Frankie Lee as Joe
- Hector V. Sarno as A Man
- Peaches Jackson as A Man's Daughter
- Gretchen Hartman as Mollie Adams

== Preservation ==
The film is now considered lost.
