= Too Much Speed =

1921 film

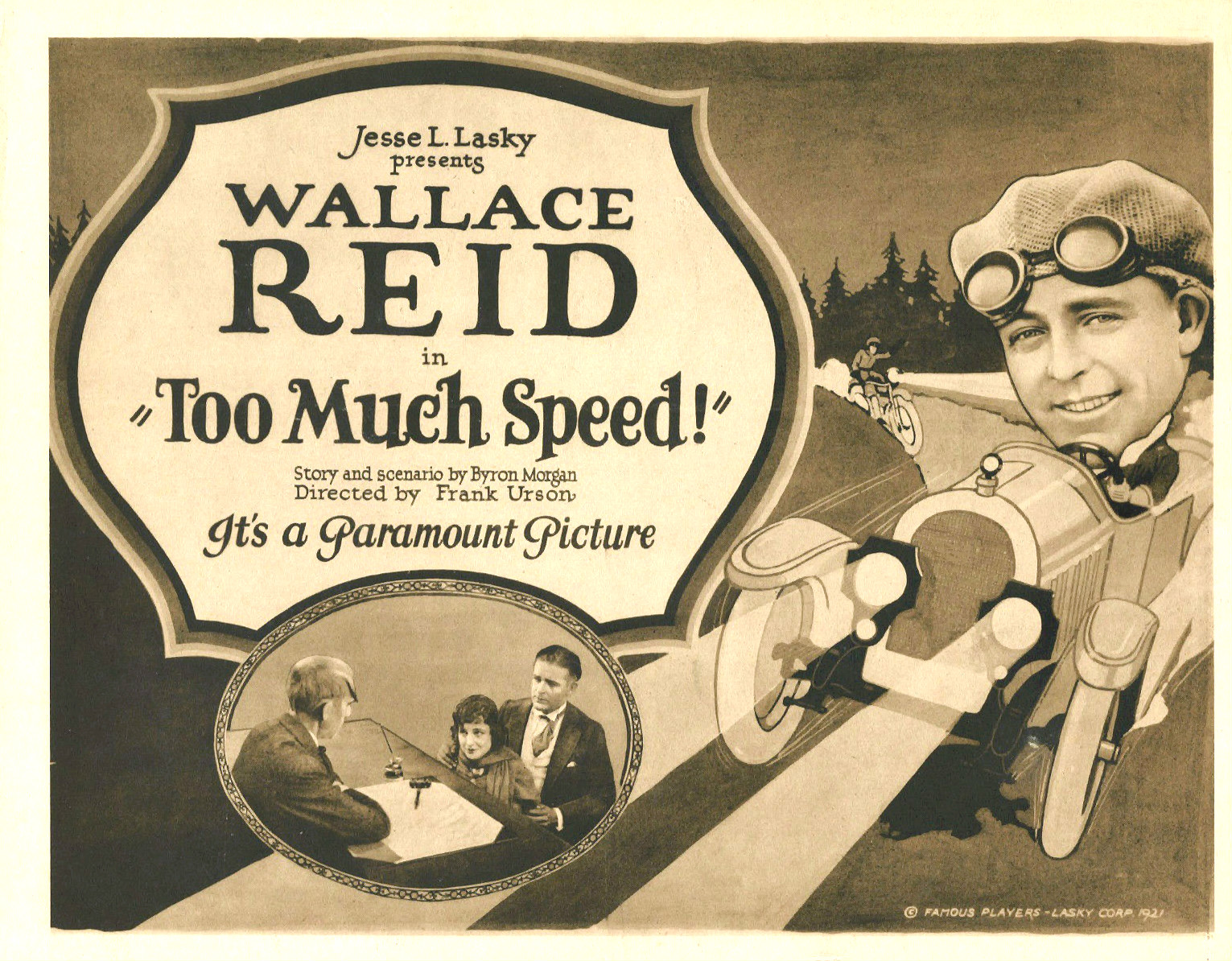
- Lobby card
- Directed by: Frank Urson
- Screenplay by: Byron Morgan
- Produced by: Jesse L. Lasky
- Starring: Wallace Reid; Agnes Ayres; Theodore Roberts; Jack Richardson; Lucien Littlefield; Guy Oliver
- Cinematography: Charles Edgar Schoenbaum
- Production company: Famous Players–Lasky Corporation
- Distributed by: Paramount Pictures
- Release date: June 5, 1921
- Running time: 50 minutes
- Country: United States
- Language: Silent (English intertitles)

Too Much Speed is a 1921 American silent drama film directed by Frank Urson, written by Byron Morgan, and starring Wallace Reid, Agnes Ayres, Theodore Roberts, Jack Richardson, Lucien Littlefield, and Guy Oliver. It was released on June 5, 1921, by Paramount Pictures. It is not known whether the film currently survives.

== Plot ==
Egotistical race-car driver Dusty Rhoades learns that humility pays off even better than acclaim.

== Cast ==
- Wallace Reid as 'Dusty' Rhoades
- Agnes Ayres as Virginia MacMurran
- Theodore Roberts as Pat MacMurran
- Jack Richardson as Tyler Hellis
- Lucien Littlefield as Jimmy Rodman
- Guy Oliver as 'Howdy' Zeeker
- Henry Johnson as Billy Dawson
- Jack Herbert as Hawks

== See also ==
- Wallace Reid filmography
