= The Valley of Hate =

1924 film

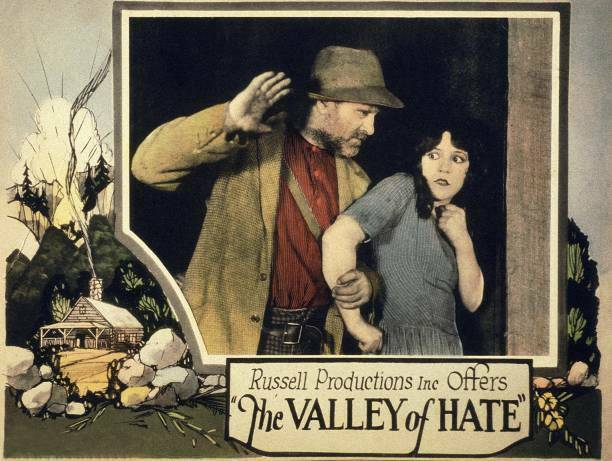
- Directed by: Russell Allen
- Written by: George Hively; Harry MacPherson
- Starring: Raymond McKee; Helen Ferguson; Earl Metcalfe
- Cinematography: Ernest Miller
- Production company: Russell Productions
- Distributed by: Sable Productions
- Release date: June 20, 1924
- Running time: 63 minutes
- Country: United States
- Languages: Silent; English intertitles

The Valley of Hate is a 1924 American silent action film directed by Russell Allen and starring Raymond McKee, Helen Ferguson and Earl Metcalfe.

== Synopsis ==
A young man in South Carolina inherits property in a valley he has never visited before. On arriving he is mistaken by the locals for a revenue officer intent on enforcing the Volstead Act on Prohibition. As the whole area lives off the moonshining trade, this prevents problems - particularly when he falls in love with the daughter of the head of the local producers.

== Cast ==
- Raymond McKee as Harvey Swope
- Helen Ferguson as Milly Hendricks
- Earl Metcalfe as Lem Darley
- Wilfred Lucas as Old Jim Darley
- Ralph Yearsley as Bob Darley
- Helen Lynch as Maurine Foster

== Bibliography ==
- Connelly, Robert B. The Silents: Silent Feature Films, 1910-36, Volume 40, Issue 2. December Press, 1998.
- Munden, Kenneth White. The American Film Institute Catalog of Motion Pictures Produced in the United States, Part 1. University of California Press, 1997.
