= Skid Proof =

1923 film by Scott R. Dunlap

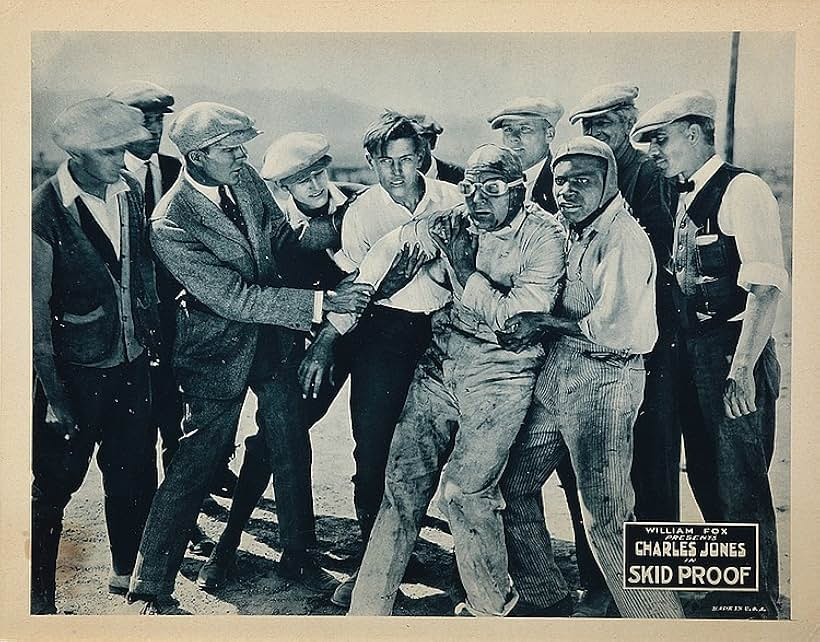
- Directed by: Scott R. Dunlap
- Written by: Harvey Gates(scenario); Byron Morgan(story)
- Produced by: William Fox
- Starring: Buck Jones
- Cinematography: Don Short
- Distributed by: Fox Film Corporation
- Release date: July 22, 1923
- Running time: 60 minutes
- Country: USA
- Language: Silent..English titles

Skid Proof is a 1923 silent film drama directed by Scott R. Dunlap and starring Buck Jones, billed as Charles Jones. It was produced and released by Fox Film Corporation.

It is a surviving film in the Museum of Modern Art collection.

== Cast ==
- Buck Jones - Jack Darwin
- Laura Anson - Nadine
- Fred Eric - Dutton Hardmere
- Jacqueline Gadsden - Lorraine Hardmere
- Peggy Shaw - Marie Hardmere
- Earl Metcalfe - Rufus Tyler (*as Earl Metcalf)
- Claude Payton - Masters (*as Claude Peyton)
- Harry Tracy - Dancing Joe (*as Harry Tracey)

== See also ==
- List of Fox Film films
