= What Women Will Do =

1921 film directed by Edward José

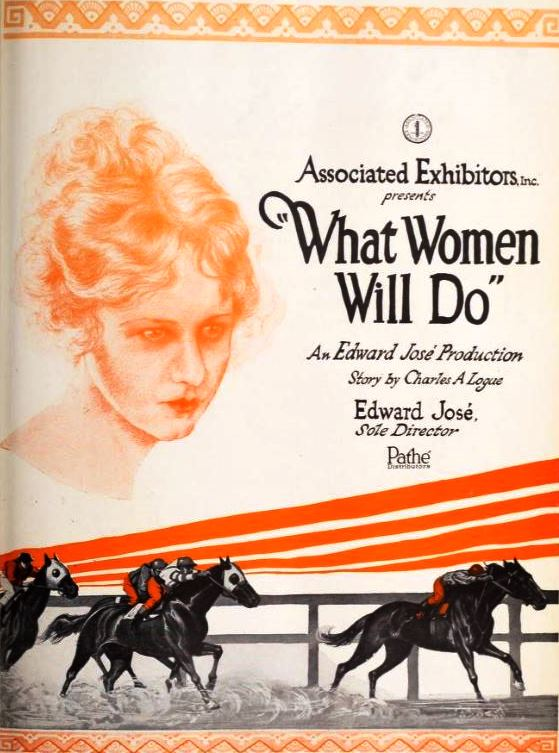
- Directed by: Edward José
- Written by: Charles A. Logue; Charles E. Whittaker
- Starring: Anna Q. Nilsson; Earl Metcalfe; Allan Forrest
- Cinematography: J. Roy Hunt
- Production company: Associated Exhibitors
- Distributed by: Pathé Exchange
- Release date: February 1921
- Running time: 6 reels
- Country: United States
- Language: Silent (English intertitles)

What Women Will Do is a 1921 American silent drama film directed by Edward José and starring Anna Q. Nilsson, Earl Metcalfe, and Allan Forrest.

== Cast ==
- Anna Q. Nilsson as Lily Gibbs
- Earl Metcalfe as Jim Coring
- Allan Forrest as Arthur Brent
- George Majeroni as Dr. Joe
- Jane Jennings as Mrs. Wade
- Riley Hatch as Stryker

== Bibliography ==
- Ken Wlaschin. Silent Mystery and Detective Movies: A Comprehensive Filmography. McFarland, 2009.
