= Helen Reimensnyder Martin =

American novelist

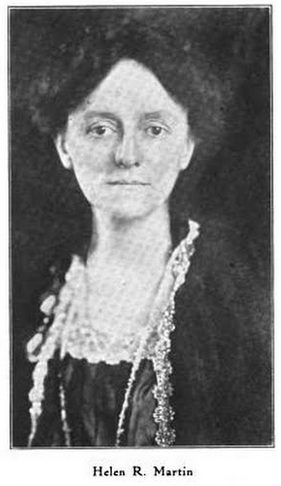
- Helen R. Martin, from a 1916 publication.
- Born: October 18, 1868; Lancaster, Pennsylvania
- Died: June 29, 1939 (aged 71); New Canaan, Connecticut
- Occupation: Novelist

Helen Reimensnyder Martin (October 18, 1868 – June 29, 1939) was an American author.

== Early life and education ==
Martin was born on October 18, 1868, in Lancaster, Pennsylvania. She was the fifth child born to Reverend Cornelius and Henrietta Thurman Reimensnyder. Her father was a German immigrant and a Lutheran pastor who worked in Ohio before settling in Lancaster. Martin was called “Bill” by those who knew her because her parents expected a boy and wanted to name her William Allen after her mother’s uncle, a governor of Ohio. Martin was a student at Swarthmore and Radcliffe Colleges.

== Career ==
Martin published 35 novels and numerous short stories between 1896 and 1939. Her work focused on the oppression of women and can be split into two topics: sophisticated white high society and rural Pennsylvania Dutch society. Her high society novels were not successful until after she achieved success with her more ethnic local color novels. According to Beverly Seaton, Martin used the Pennsylvania Dutch to critique society and advance her feminist viewpoint because their culture was unfamiliar to most Americans, making it safer for Martin to express controversial opinions about the rights of women and children in her stories. However, Martin's work also created negative stereotypes of the Pennsylvania Dutch.

Martin's most well-known novel is one of her earliest books, Tillie: A Mennonite Maid. As is typical of Martin's work, Pennsylvania Dutch women are oppressed by brutish, stingy men and a patriarchal society in Tillie. Like all of Martin's heroines, Tillie escapes her repressive society through education and independent employment.

Sabina, A Story of the Amish (1905) may be the first Amish romance novel ever published. It tells the story of a young Amish woman with clairvoyant powers.

Tillie: A Mennonite Maid and Barnabetta (Erstwhile Susan) were turned into Broadway plays. Four of Martin's literary works were turned into the films Erstwhile Susan (1919), Tillie (1922), The Snob (1924), and The Parasite (1925).

Numerous Pennsylvania Germans objected to her stereotypical depictions of their culture.

== Bibliography ==
- Unchaperoned (1896)
- Warren Hyde (1897)
- The Elusive Hildegarde (1900)
- Tillie, a Mennonite Maid (1904)
- Sabina, A Story of the Amish (1905)
- His Courtship (1907)
- The Betrothal of Elypholate (1907)
- The Revolt of Ann Royle (1908)
- The Crossways (1910; new edition, 1914)
- When Half-Gods Go (1911)
- The Fighting Doctor (1912)
- The Parasite (1913)
- Barnabetta (Erstwhile Susan) (1914)
- Martha of the Mennonite Country (1915)
- Her Husband's Purse (1916)
- Those Fitzenbergers (1917)
- Gertie Swartz: Fanatic or Christian (1918)
- Maggie of Virginsburg (1918)
- The Schoolmaster of Hessville (1920)
- The Marriage of Susan (1921)
- The Church on the Avenue (1923)
- The Snob (1924)
- Sylvia of the Minute (1927)
- Wings of Healing (1929)
- Tender Talons (1930)
- Emmy Untamed (1937)
- The Ordeal of Minnie Schultz (1937)

== Personal life ==
In 1899, Helen Reimensnyder married a music teacher named Frederic C. Martin. The couple settled in Harrisburg, Pennsylvania. Around 1904, Martin gave birth to her first child, who died in infancy. The couple had two more children, a boy and a girl. Frederic C. Martin died in 1936.

== See also ==
- Anna Balmer Myers
