= Yvonne from Paris =

1919 film directed by Emmett J. Flynn

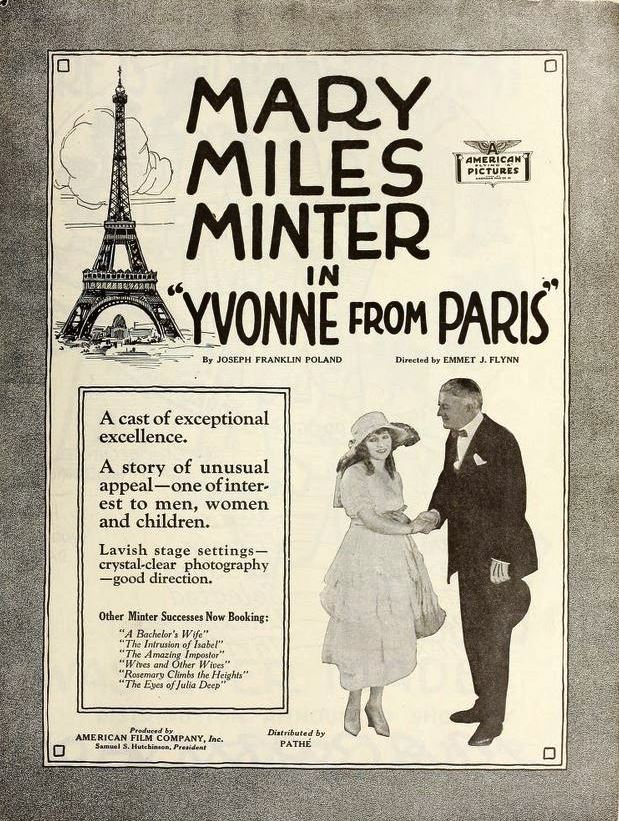
- Advertisement
- Directed by: Emmett J. Flynn
- Written by: Frank Howard Clark
- Story by: Joseph F. Poland
- Starring: Mary Miles Minter; Allan Forrest; Vera Lewis
- Production company: American Film Company
- Distributed by: Pathé Exchange
- Release date: July 13, 1919
- Running time: 5 reels
- Country: United States
- Languages: Silent; English intertitles

Yvonne from Paris is a 1919 American silent comedy film directed by Emmett J. Flynn and starring Mary Miles Minter, Allan Forrest, and Vera Lewis. It was Minter's last film with the American Film Company; she signed a contract with Realart, part of Famous Players–Lasky, in June 1919.

== Plot ==
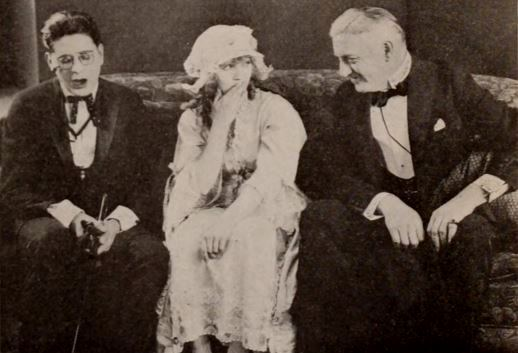
Mary Miles Minter, Allan Forrest and J. Barney Sherry in "Yvonne from Paris" (1919)

As described in various film magazine reviews, Yvonne Halbert is a dancing girl in Paris. Tired of the overbearing nature of her aunt and manager Marie Provost, she runs away to New York, where her aunt has signed a contract for her to perform in a musical comedy production. On the voyage, Yvonne makes enemies with a young woman named Cecile, and friends with an Italian violinist, Luigi, with whose family she initially stays when she arrives in New York.

Yvonne makes money at first as a street dancer while Luigi plays his violin, and later she finds work at a cabaret. Here she is spotted by David Marston, the producer of the play in which her aunt had signed her to appear. He takes on the young girl as a replacement for his disappeared French star and bills her as Yvonne, ignorant of the fact that she is indeed the real Yvonne. During rehearsals, Yvonne becomes acquainted with the play's writer, Lawrence Bartlett, and a romance develops between the two.

Cecile, however, the young woman with whom Yvonne quarrelled on the ship, becomes jealous of Yvonne and tries to usurp her position as the play's star. Cecile's partner Pembroke encourages her to claim that she is the real Yvonne from Paris, and also threatens Yvonne, although she is rescued from his clutches by Bartlett. The truth is revealed when Yvonne's aunt arrives at the theatre and identifies her niece; Cecile is dismissed and Bartlett and Yvonne become engaged.

== Cast ==
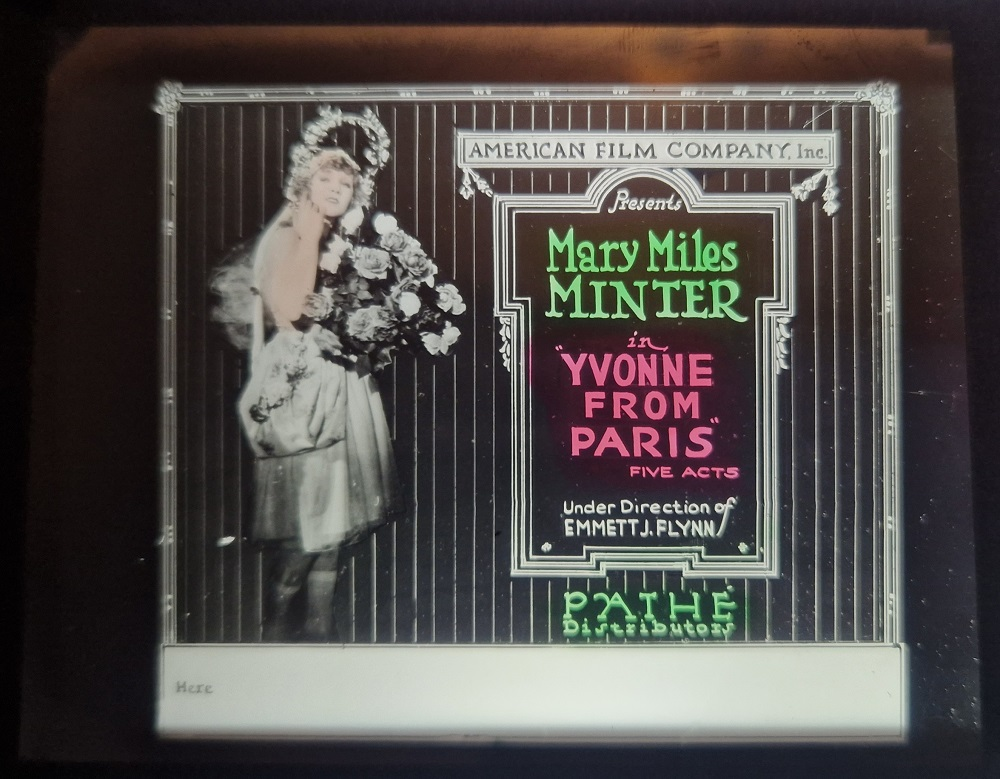
Lantern Slide for "Yvonne from Paris"

- Mary Miles Minter as Yvonne Halbert
- Allan Forrest as Lawrence Bartlett
- Vera Lewis as Aunt Marie Provost
- J. Barney Sherry as David Marston
- Bertram Grassby as Harley Pembroke
- Rosemary Theby as Cecile
- E. Alyn Warren as Luigi
- Jack Farrell as Henri Franey
- Jeanne Robbins
- Frank Clark

== Preservation ==
Yvonne from Paris is currently presumed lost. In February of 2021, the film was cited by the National Film Preservation Board on their Lost U.S. Silent Feature Films list.

== Bibliography ==
- Donald W. McCaffrey & Christopher P. Jacobs. Guide to the Silent Years of American Cinema. Greenwood Publishing, 1999. ISBN 0-313-30345-2
