= Always Goodbye (1931 film) =

1931 film by Kenneth MacKenna

- Directed by: Kenneth MacKenna; William Cameron Menzies
- Written by: Kate L. McLaurin; Lynn Starling
- Produced by: John W. Considine Jr.
- Starring: Elissa Landi; Lewis Stone; Paul Cavanagh
- Cinematography: Arthur Edeson
- Edited by: Harold D. Schuster
- Production company: Fox Film Corporation
- Distributed by: Fox Film Corporation
- Release date: May 31, 1931
- Running time: 62 minutes
- Country: United States
- Language: English

Always Goodbye is a 1931 American pre-Code drama film directed by Kenneth MacKenna and William Cameron Menzies and starring Elissa Landi, Lewis Stone and Paul Cavanagh. It was produced and distributed by Fox Film.

== Plot ==
In London a con man and a former heiress join forces to try and cheat a millionaire at his Italian villa.

== Cast ==
- Elissa Landi as Lila Banning
- Lewis Stone as John Graham
- Paul Cavanagh as Reginald Armstrong, alias of Morgan
- John Garrick as Cyril Shayne
- Frederick Kerr as Sir George Boomer
- Lumsden Hare as Blake
- Herbert Bunston as Merson
- Frank Atkinson as Servant
- Mischa Auer as Mechanic
- Louise Carver as Tenant in Hallway
- Albert Conti as Party Gossip
- Gino Corrado as Italian Policeman
- Mary Gordon as Mrs. MacPherson, Moviegoer
- Inez Palange as Italian Maid
- Douglas Walton as Party Gossip

== Bibliography ==
- Solomon, Aubrey. The Fox Film Corporation, 1915-1935. A History and Filmography. McFarland & Co, 2011.
