= Frank Urson =

American film director

- Born: Frank John Urson; March 21, 1887; Chicago, Illinois, U.S.
- Died: August 17, 1928 (aged 41); Indian Lake, Michigan, U.S.
- Occupation(s): Film director, cinematographer

Frank John Urson (March 21, 1887 – August 17, 1928) was an American silent film director and cinematographer from Chicago, Illinois. Originally a photographer, he moved on to cinematography and film directing for the Thanhouser Company in New Rochelle, New York. He is also credited with acting in one film, Her Gallant Knights, which starred William Garwood in 1913. Urson directed Changing Husbands. He is perhaps best known for his 1927 film Chicago, produced by Cecil B. DeMille.

== Biography ==
He was born on March 21, 1887, in Chicago, Illinois. Urson died on August 17, 1928, at age 41 from drowning in Indian Lake, Michigan.

== Partial filmography ==
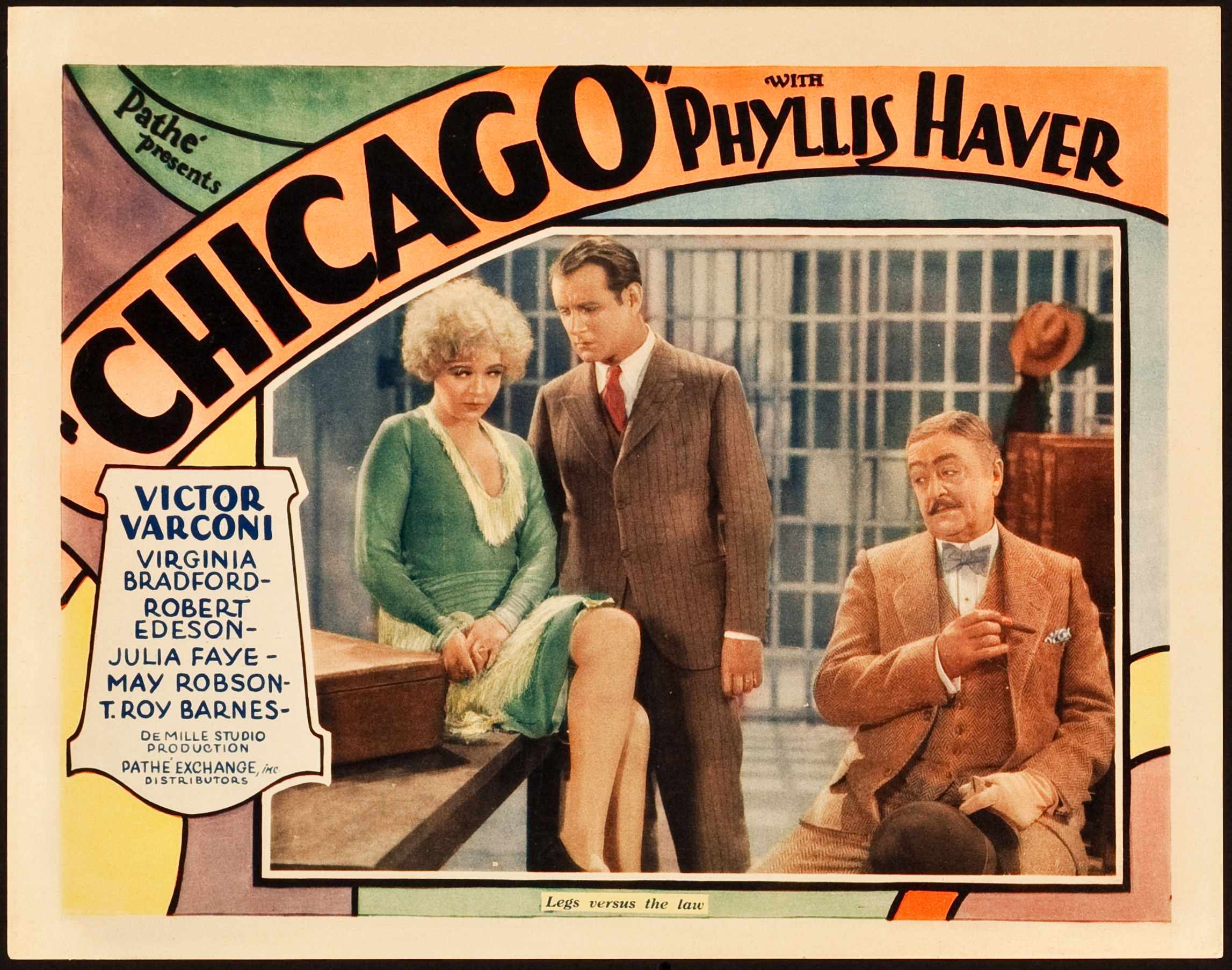
Lobby card for Chicago (1927), the last and most notable film credited to Urson as a director

- Stranded (1916, cinematographer)
- Nina, the Flower Girl (1917, cinematographer)
- You're Fired (1919, cinematographer)
- The Valley of the Giants (1919, cinematographer)
- Too Much Speed (1921)
- The Hell Diggers (1921)
- Exit the Vamp (1921)
- The Strangers' Banquet (1922)
- Tillie (1922)
- The Heart Specialist (1922)
- South of Suva (1922)
- Her Man o' War (1926)
- Almost Human (1927)
- Chicago (1927)
