= List of American films of 1914 =

American produced feature-length motion pictures (consisting of at least four film reels) released in 1914 number more than 400.

Title	Director	Cast	Genre	Notes
Across the Pacific	Edwin Carewe	Dorothy Dalton, Samuel E. Hines	Adventure	World Film
The Amateur Detective	Carroll Fleming	Carey L. Hastings, Ernest C. Warde, Muriel Ostriche	Comedy	
An American Citizen	J. Searle Dawley	John Barrymore, Alexander Gaden	Comedy	Paramount
The Archeologist	Henry Otto	Charlotte Burton, Edward Coxen, George Field, Winifred Greenwood, John Steppling	Drama	
Aristocracy	Thomas N. Heffron	Tyrone Power Sr., Edna Mayo	Drama	Paramount
At the Potter's Wheel	Lorimer Johnston	Charlotte Burton, Sydney Ayres, Caroline Frances Cooke, Louise Lester, Jack Richardson, Vivian Rich	Drama	
The Avenging Conscience	D. W. Griffith	Henry B. Walthall, Blanche Sweet	Drama, Horror	
Back to the Farm	Oliver Hardy	Herbert Tracey, Royal Byron, Eloise Willard, Mabel Paige, Oliver Hardy	Comedy	
The Baggage Smasher		Fatty Arbuckle	Comedy	
The Bargain	Reginald Barker	William S. Hart, J. Barney Sherry, Clara Williams	Western	Added to the National Film Registry in 2010
Barnyard Flirtations	Fatty Arbuckle	Fatty Arbuckle	Comedy	
A Bath House Beauty	Fatty Arbuckle	Fatty Arbuckle	Comedy	
The Battle of the Sexes	D. W. Griffith	Donald Crisp, Lillian Gish	Drama	
The Beggar Child	William Desmond Taylor	Charlotte Burton, Edward Coxen, George Field, Winifred Greenwood, John Steppling		
Between Showers	Henry Lehrman	Charlie Chaplin, Ford Sterling, Chester Conklin		Filmed at Keystone Studios
Billy's Rival	William Desmond Taylor	William Garwood, Louise Lester, Jack Richardson, Vivian Rich. Harry von Meter		
A Blowout at Santa Banana		Charlotte Burton, Sydney Ayres, Louise Lester, Jack Richardson	Comedy	
The Body in the Trunk	John O'Brien	William Garwood, George Larkin		
The Boer War	George Melford	Jane Wolfe, Marin Sais	War drama	Kalem
Break, Break, Break	Harry A. Pollard	B. Reeves Eason, William Garwood, Louise Lester, Jack Richardson, Vivian Rich, Harry von Meter	Drama	
Brewster's Millions	Oscar Apfel, Cecil B. DeMille	Edward Abeles, Sydney Deane, Joseph Singleton	Comedy	Paramount
Brute Force	D. W. Griffith	Robert Harron, Mae Marsh, William J. Butler, Wilfred Lucas	Drama	
Business Versus Love	Tom Ricketts	Edward Coxen, Winifred Greenwood, Harry von Meter, Jack Richardson		
A Busy Day	Charlie Chaplin	Charlie Chaplin, Mack Swain, Phyllis Allen	Comedy	With a cameo by Mack Sennett
The Butterfly	Tom Ricketts	Charlotte Burton, George Field, Edward Coxen, Edith Borella, Jean Durrell, Ida Lewis, John Steppling		
By the Sun's Rays	Charles Giblyn	Murdock MacQuarrie, Lon Chaney	Western	
Calamity Anne's Love Affair	Tom Ricketts	Charlotte Burton, Louise Lester, George Field, Edith Borella, B. Reeves Eason	Western	The final film in the Calamity Anne series
The Call of the North	Oscar Apfel, Cecil B. DeMille	Robert Edeson, Theodore Roberts	Adventure	
The Call of the Traumerei	Jacques Jaccard and Lorimer Johnston	Charlotte Burton, Sydney Ayres, Caroline Frances Cooke, Jack Richardson		
Called Back	Otis Turner	Herbert Rawlinson, Ann Little, Allan Forrest	Drama	Universal
Cameo of the Yellowstone	Sydney Ayres	William Garwood, Harry De Vere, Louise Lester	Western	
Captain Alvarez	Rollin S. Sturgeon	Edith Storey, William Desmond Taylor, George Holt	Historical Drama	A Vitagraph 5-reel film
Caught in a Cabaret	Mabel Normand	Charlie Chaplin, Mabel Normand, Edgar Kennedy	Comedy	
Caught in a Flue	Morgan Wallace	Roscoe Arbuckle	Comedy	Keystone Studios
Caught in the Rain	Charlie Chaplin	Charlie Chaplin, Mack Swain, Alice Davenport	Comedy	The first of many films that Charlie Chaplin both directed and starred in
The Certainty of Man		Charlotte Burton, Sydney Ayres, Chick Morrison	Drama	
Chicken Chaser	Roscoe Arbuckle	Fatty Arbuckle, Gordon Griffith	Comedy	
Cinderella	James Kirkwood	Mary Pickford, Owen Moore, Isobel Vernon	Fantasy Drama	
The Cocoon and the Butterfly	Sydney Ayres	William Garwood, Louise Lester	Drama	
The Combination of the Safe	Francis J. Grandon	Earle Foxe	Crime drama	
The Coming of the Padres	Lorimer Johnston	Sydney Ayres, Perry Banks, Louise Lester		
Cruel, Cruel Love	George Nichols, Mack Sennett	Charlie Chaplin, Edgar Kennedy, Minta Durfee	Comedy	
Damaged Goods	Tom Ricketts, Richard Bennett	Richard Bennett, Adrienne Morrison, Maude Milton		
Damon and Pythias	Otis Turner	William Worthington, Herbert Rawlinson, Cleo Madison	Epic	Universal
David Gray's Estate		Charlotte Burton, Sydney Ayres, Chick Morrison		
Destinies Fulfilled	Lorimer Johnston	Charlotte Burton, Sydney Ayres, Jacques Jaccard, Violet Knights	Comedy	
Does It End Right?	Sydney Ayres	William Garwood, Charlotte Burton, Louise Lester, Vivian Rich		
Dough and Dynamite	Charlie Chaplin	Charlie Chaplin, Chester Conklin, Fritz Schade	Comedy	
The Envoy Extraordinary	Lorimer Johnston	Jack Nelson, Caroline Frances Cooke	Drama	
The Escape	D. W. Griffith	Donald Crisp, Blanche Sweet, Mae Marsh	Drama	
The Exploits of Elaine	Louis J. Gasnier, George B. Seitz, Leopold Wharton	Pearl White, Sheldon Lewis	Drama serial	
The Face on the Bar Room Floor	Charles Chaplin	Charles Chaplin, Cecile Arnold, Fritz Schade	Comedy	
The Fatal Mallet	Mack Sennett	Charles Chaplin, Mabel Normand, Mack Sennett	Comedy	
Fate's Decree		William Garwood, Richard Henry Cummings, Billie West		
Fatty's Magic Pants	Roscoe Arbuckle	Fatty Arbuckle, Charly Chase	Comedy	
Feast and Famine	Sydney Ayres	B. Reeves Eason, William Garwood, Harry von Meter		
A Film Johnnie	George Nichols	Charlie Chaplin, Fatty Arbuckle, Mabel Normand		
The Final Impulse	Tom Ricketts	Charlotte Burton, Perry Banks, William Bertram, Edward Coxen		
The Floor Above	James Kirkwood Sr.	Earle Foxe, Henry Walthall, Dorothy Gish	Mystery drama	
A Florida Enchantment	Sidney Drew	Sidney Drew, Edith Storey		
The Forbidden Room	Allan Dwan	Murdock MacQuarrie, Pauline Bush	Drama	
Gentlemen of Nerve	Charlie Chaplin	Charlie Chaplin, Mabel Normand, Chester Conklin	Comedy	
Gertie the Dinosaur	Winsor McCay	Winsor McCay, George McManus	Cartoon	Groundbreaking animated short
Getting Acquainted	Charlie Chaplin	Charlie Chaplin, Mabel Normand, Phyllis Allen	Comedy	
The Ghost Breaker	Oscar Apfel, Cecil B. DeMille	H. B. Warner, Rita Stanwood, Theodore Roberts	Drama	
The Girl in the Shack	Edward Morrissey	Earle Foxe, Spottiswoode Aitken, Mae Marsh		
A Good Little Devil	Edwin S. Porter, J. Searle Dawley	Mary Pickford, Ernest Truex, David Belasco	Drama	Pickford's first feature, survives only in an abridged version.
The Green-Eyed Devil	James Kirkwood	Spottiswoode Aitken, Earle Foxe, William Garwood		
A Happy Coersion		Perry Banks, William Bertram, Jacques Jaccard		
The Hazards of Helen		Helen Holmes	Adventure serial	A serial of 119 12 minute episodes
Her Friend the Bandit	Charles Chaplin	Charles Chaplin, Mabel Normand, Charles Murray	Comedy	
Her Younger Sister	Frank Cooley	Charlotte Burton, Fred Gamble	Comedy	
His Faith in Humanity	Sydney Ayres	William Garwood, Louise Lester		
His Father's Rifle	Edward LeSaint	Earle Foxe, Bertram Grassby	Drama	
His Favourite Pastime	George Nichols	Charlie Chaplin, Fatty Arbuckle, Viola Barry	Comedy	
His Majesty, the Scarecrow of Oz	J. Farrell MacDonald	Violet MacMillan, Pierre Couderc	Fantasy	Loosely based on The Wizard of Oz and written and produced by L. Frank Baum
His Musical Career	Charlie Chaplin	Charlie Chaplin, Mack Swain, Charley Chase	Comedy	
His New Profession	Charlie Chaplin	Charlie Chaplin, Charley Chase, Fatty Arbuckle	Comedy	
His Prehistoric Past	Charlie Chaplin	Charlie Chaplin, Mack Swain, Fritz Schade	Comedy	Chaplin's last film with Keystone Studios
His Trysting Place	Charlie Chaplin	Charlie Chaplin, Mabel Normand	Comedy	
Home, Sweet Home	D. W. Griffith	Earle Foxe, Henry B. Walthall, Dorothy Gish	Biographical drama	
The Hopes of Blind Alley	Allan Dwan	Murdock MacQuarrie, Pauline Bush	Drama	
The Hunchback	Christy Cabanne	F. A. Turner, William Garwood, Lillian Gish	Drama	
Imar the Servitor		William Garwood	Drama	
In the Candlelight	Tom Ricketts	William Garwood, Charlotte Burton		
In the Footprints of Mozart	William Desmond Taylor	Charlotte Burton, William Bertram, Edith Borella		
In the Land of the Head Hunters	Edward S. Curtis		Documentary drama	
In the Open	Sydney Ayres	William Garwood, Louise Lester		
In Tune	Henry Otto	Charlotte Burton, Edward Coxen, George Field, Winifred Greenwood		
Jail Birds	Sydney Ayres	William Garwood, Charlotte Burton		
Judith of Bethulia	D. W. Griffith	Blanche Sweet, Henry B. Walthall	Biblical drama	
The Jungle	Augustus E. Thomas, George Irving, John H. Pratt	George Nash, Gail Kane, Julia Hurley	Drama	
Kid Auto Races at Venice	Henry Lehrman	Charlie Chaplin	Comedy	The first appearance of Charlie Chaplin's Little Tramp character
The Kiss	Ulysses Davis	Ella Margaret Gibson, George Holt, William Desmond Taylor	Drama	
The Knockout	Charles Avery	Charlie Chaplin, Fatty Arbuckle, Edgar Kennedy	Comedy	
Laughing Gas	Charlie Chaplin	Charlie Chaplin, Fritz Schade	Comedy	
The Life of General Villa	Christy Cabanne, Raoul Walsh	Pancho Villa, Irene Hunt, Raoul Walsh	Drama	Lost film
A Little Madonna	Ulysses Davis	William Desmond Taylor, Patricia Palmer	Drama	
The Livid Flame	Francis J. Grandon	Earle Foxe, Lafe McKee	Drama	
The Lost Sermon		William Garwood, Harry De Vere, Harry von Meter		
Love and Bullets	Fatty Arbuckle	Fatty Arbuckle, Phyllis Allen, Charley Chase	Comedy	
The Lover's Gift		Earle Foxe, Mary Alden, Francelia Billington		
Lucille Love, Girl of Mystery	Francis Ford	Grace Cunard, Francis Ford, Harry Schumm, John Ford	Action serial	Universal's first serial
The Lure of the Sawdust	Tom Ricketts	Charlotte Burton, George Field, Edward Coxen	Drama	
Mabel at the Wheel	Mabel Normand, Mack Sennett	Charlie Chaplin, Mabel Normand	Comedy	
Mabel's Blunder	Mabel Normand	Mabel Normand, Charly Chase, Al St. John	Comedy	
Mabel's Busy Day	Mabel Normand	Charlie Chaplin, Mabel Normand	Comedy	
Mabel's Married Life	Charlie Chaplin	Charlie Chaplin, Mabel Normand	Comedy	
Mabel's Strange Predicament	Henry Lehrman	Charlie Chaplin, Mabel Normand	Comedy	
The Magic Cloak of Oz	J. Farrell MacDonald	Juanita Hansen, Violet MacMillan, Mildred Harris	Fantasy drama	Written and produced by L. Frank Baum
Making a Living	Henry Lehrman	Charlie Chaplin, Virginia Kirtley, Alice Davenport	Comedy	The first film featuring Charlie Chaplin
The Man from Home	Cecil B. DeMille	Charles Richman, Theodore Roberts, Fred Montague	Drama	
A Man's Way	Sydney Ayres	William Garwood, Charlotte Burton, Louise Lester		
The Masquerader	Charlie Chaplin	Charlie Chaplin, Fatty Arbuckle	Comedy	
The Master Key	Robert Z. Leonard	Robert Z. Leonard, Ella Hall	Serial	
The Master Mind	Oscar Apfel, Cecil B. DeMille	Edmund Breese, Fred Montague, Jane Darwell	Crime drama	
Mein Lieber Katrina		Charlotte Burton, George Field, Ida Lewis	Comedy	
Mein Lieber Katrina Catches a Convict	Tom Ricketts	Charlotte Burton, Harry De Vere, Perry Banks	Comedy	
Michael Strogoff	Lloyd B. Carleton	Jacob P. Adler, Daniel Makarenko, Eleanor Barry	Drama	Feature adaptation of Jules Verne novel
Mrs. Wiggs of the Cabbage Patch	Harold Entwistle	Beatriz Michelena, House Peters	Comedy drama	World Film
The Mystery of the Hindu Image	Raoul Walsh	Raoul Walsh, Dark Cloud, Eagle Eye	Drama	Raoul's Walsh's earliest surviving directorial effort
Nature's Touch	Sydney Ayres	William Garwood, Jack Richardson, Louise Lester		
The Navy Aviator	Sydney Ayres,	Sydney Ayres, Caroline Cooke, Jack Richardson		
Neptune's Daughter	Herbert Brenon	Annette Kellerman, William E. Shay, William Welsh	Fantasy	
The New Janitor	Charlie Chaplin	Charlie Chaplin, Jess Dandy, John T. Dillon	Comedy	
Old Enough to Be Her Grandpa	Tom Ricketts	Charlotte Burton, William Garwood	Comedy	
The Only Son	Oscar Apfel, Cecil B. DeMille	Jim Blackwell, Jane Darwell		
The Opened Shutters	Otis Turner	William Worthington, Frank Lloyd, Herbert Rawlinson	Drama	Universal
The Oubliette	Charles Giblyn	Murdock MacQuarrie, Pauline Bush and Lon Chaney	Historical Drama	
The Patchwork Girl of Oz	J. Farrell MacDonald	Violet MacMillan, Pierre Couderc	Fantasy drama	Written and produced by L. Frank Baum
The Perils of Pauline	Louis J. Gasnier	Pearl White	Adventure serial	
The Power of Light	Lorimer Johnston	Charlotte Burton, Sydney Ayres, Jacques Jaccard	Drama	
The Property Man	Charlie Chaplin	Charlie Chaplin, Phyllis Allen, Alice Davenport	Comedy	
Recreation	Charles Chaplin	Charles Chaplin	Comedy	
Redbird Wins	Sydney Ayres	Perry Banks, William Garwood		
The Redemption of a Pal	Henry Otto	Edith Borella, Charlotte Burton, George Field	Drama	
Richelieu	Allan Dwan	Murdock MacQuarrie, William C. Dowlan	Biopic	
The Rose Bush of Memories		Earle Foxe, Mary Alden, Francelia Billington		
Rose of the Rancho	Cecil B. DeMille	Bessie Barriscale, Jane Darwell, Jeanie MacPherson	Western	
Rosemary, That's for Remembrance	Francis J. Grandon	Earle Foxe, Adda Gleason	Drama	
The Rounders	Charlie Chaplin	Charlie Chaplin, Fatty Arbuckle, Phyllis Allen	Comedy	
Salomy Jane	William Nigh	Beatriz Michelena, House Peters	Western	
Samson	J. Farrell MacDonald	J. Warren Kerrigan, George Periolat, Lule Warrenton	Drama	
Shore Acres	Jack Pratt	Riley Hatch, Conway Tearle	Drama	Alco
Shotgun Jones	Colin Campbell	Wheeler Oakman	Western	
Should a Woman Divorce?	Edwin McKim	Lea Leland, Leonid Samoloff	Drama	
Sir Galahad of Twilight	Sydney Ayres	Perry Banks, B. Reeves Eason, William Garwood	Drama	
The Sleeping Sentinel			Historical drama	
A Slice of Life	Tom Ricketts	Charlotte Burton, Perry Banks		
The Son of Thomas Gray	William Desmond Taylor	Virginia Fordyce, Sydney Ayres, Jacques Jaccard		
The Song of the Sea Shell	William Desmond Taylor	Edith Borella, Charlotte Burton, George Field	Drama	
A Soul Astray	William Desmond Taylor	Charlotte Burton, William Bertram, Edith Borella		
The Sower Reaps	Tom Ricketts	William Garwood, Harry von Meter, Vivian Rich	Drama	
Sparrow of the Circus		B. Reeves Eason, Jack Richardson		
The Spoilers	Colin Campbell	William Farnum, Kathlyn Williams, Tom Santschi	Drama	
The Squaw Man	Oscar Apfel, Cecil B. DeMille	Dustin Farnum	Western	DeMille's directorial debut
The Star Boarder	George Nichols	Charlie Chaplin, Minta Durfee, Edgar Kennedy, Alice Davenport, Gordon Griffith	Comedy	
A Story of Little Italy	William Desmond Taylor	Sydney Ayres, Jacques Jaccard, Jack Richardson, Vivian Rich, Harry von Meter		
The Story of the Olive	Sydney Ayres	Sydney Ayres, Perry Banks, Edith Borella, Caroline Cooke, Harry von Meter		
The Strength o' Ten	Tom Ricketts	William Garwood, Harry von Meter	Drama	
A Study in Scarlet	Francis Ford	Francis Ford, Grace Cunard, John Ford		Francis playing Sherlock Holmes and John as Dr. Watson
Sweet and Low	William Desmond Taylor	William Garwood, Harry von Meter	Drama	
Such a Little Queen	Edwin S. Porter, Hugh Ford	Mary Pickford, Harold Lockwood	Comedy	
The Taming of Sunnybrook Nell	Sydney Ayres	William Garwood, Louise Lester, B. Reeves Eason		
Tango Tangles	Mack Sennett	Charlie Chaplin, Fatty Arbuckle, Ford Sterling	Comedy	
The Telltale Knife	Tom Mix	Tom Mix, Hoot Gibson	Western	
The Ten of Spades	William Garwood	William Garwood, Victory Bateman, William Lowery, Muriel Ostriche		
Tess of the Storm Country	Edwin S. Porter	Mary Pickford	Drama	
Their Worldly Goods	Sydney Ayres	William Garwood, Edith Borella, Charlotte Burton		
This Is th' Life	Henry Otto	Charlotte Burton, George Field, Edward Coxen, Edith Borella, John Steppling		
Those Love Pangs	Charlie Chaplin	Charlie Chaplin, Chester Conklin, Cecile Arnold	Comedy	
A Ticket to Red Horse Gulch		Belle Bennett, William Garwood, William Lowery	Western	
Tillie's Punctured Romance	Mack Sennett	Charlie Chaplin, Marie Dressler, Mabel Normand, Keystone Cops	Comedy	
To Be Called For	Francis J. Grandon	Adda Gleason, Lafe McKee, Earle Foxe	Comedy	
The Town of Nazareth		Charlotte Burton, William Bertram, Albert Cavens, Edward Coxen		
True Western Hearts	William Desmond Taylor	Sydney Ayres, Helen Armstrong, Jacques Jaccard	Western	
A Turn of the Cards	William Garwood	William Garwood, Howard Davies, William Lowery	Drama	
Twenty Minutes of Love	Charlie Chaplin	Charlie Chaplin, Minta Durfee, Edgar Kennedy	Comedy	Chaplin's directorial debut
Uncle Tom's Cabin	William Robert Daly	Sam Lucas, Teresa Michelena, Roy Applegate	Drama	World Film. First feature film adaptation of Stowe's novel.
The Unlawful Trade	Allan Dwan	Pauline Bush, William Lloyd	Drama	
The Unmasking	Sydney Ayres	William Garwood, Harry De Vere, Jack Richardson, Vivian Rich		
Unto the Weak	Allan Dwan	Charlotte Burton, William Bertram	Drama	
The Virginian	Cecil B. DeMille	Dustin Farnum	Western	Based on the novel by Owen Wister
What's His Name	Cecil B. DeMille	Max Figman, Lolita Robertson	Comedy	
When a Woman Waits	Henry Otto	Charlotte Burton, Bessie Banks	Drama	
When Rome Ruled	George Fitzmaurice	Nell Craig, Clifford Bruce, Riley Hatch	Historical	Pathe Exchange
The Widow's Investment		Charlotte Burton, Sydney Ayres, Chick Morrison	Drama	
Wildflower	Allan Dwan	Marguerite Clark, Harold Lockwood	Romance	
The Wishing Ring	Maurice Tourneur	Vivian Martin, Alec B. Francis, Chester Barnett	Comedy	
The Wrath of the Gods	Reginald Barker	Sessue Hayakawa, Tsuru Aoki, Frank Borzage	Drama	
The Wrong Birds	William Desmond Taylor	Edith Borella, Charlotte Burton, George Field, Edward Coxen	Drama	

== See also ==
- 1914 in the United States
