= The Son of Thomas Gray =

- Directed by: Lorimer Johnston
- Starring: Sydney Ayres; Jacques Jaccard; Louise Lester
- Distributed by: Mutual Film
- Release date: January 10, 1914
- Country: United States
- Languages: Silent film English intertitles

The Son of Thomas Gray is a 1914 American silent short film directed by Lorimer Johnston. The film stars Virginia Fordyce, Dolly Beal, Sydney Ayres, Jacques Jaccard, Louise Lester, Jack Richardson, Vivian Rich, and Harry Van Meter.
