= The Widow's Investment =

- Starring: Charlotte Burton; Sydney Ayres; Chick Morrison
- Distributed by: Mutual Film Corporation
- Release date: April 20, 1914
- Country: United States
- Languages: Silent film English intertitles

The Widow's Investment is a 1914 American silent short drama film starring Charlotte Burton, Sydney Ayres, Jack Richardson, Perry Banks, Edith Borella, Caroline Cooke, Vivian Rich, and Harry Van Meter.
