= A Story of Little Italy =

- Directed by: Lorimer Johnston
- Written by: Marc Edmund Jones
- Starring: Sydney Ayres; Jacques Jaccard; Jack Richardson; Vivian Rich; Harry Van Meter
- Distributed by: Mutual Film Corporation
- Release date: March 14, 1914
- Country: United States
- Language: Silent film

A Story of Little Italy is a 1914 American silent short drama film directed by Lorimer Johnston. The film stars Sydney Ayres, Jacques Jaccard, Jack Richardson, Vivian Rich, and Harry Van Meter.

== Censorship ==
The Chicago Board of Censors removed the scene of three men entering and exiting through a window.
