= A Happy Coercion =

- Written by: Theodosia Harris
- Starring: Perry Banks; William Bertram; Louise Lester
- Distributed by: Mutual Film
- Release date: April 8, 1914
- Country: United States
- Languages: Silent film English intertitles

A Happy Coercion is a 1914 American silent short comedy film based on a story by Theodosia Harris. The film stars Perry Banks, William Bertram, Jacques Jaccard, Louise Lester, Jack Richardson, Vivian Rich, and Harry Van Meter.
