= The Sower Reaps =

- Directed by: Thomas Ricketts
- Written by: Robert A. Sanborn (story)
- Starring: William Garwood; Harry von Meter; Vivian Rich
- Distributed by: Mutual Film
- Release date: December 21, 1914
- Running time: Short
- Country: United States
- Languages: Silent film English intertitles

The Sower Reaps is a 1914 American silent short drama film directed by Thomas Ricketts, starring William Garwood, Harry von Meter, and Vivian Rich.

== Cast ==
- William Garwood as Ben Rolfe
- Harry von Meter as Mr. Pike
- Vivian Rich as Laurel Pike, his daughter
- Reaves Eason as Tim Rolfe
- Jack Richardson as Peter Pelham
- Louise Lester as His wife
- Perry Banks as Crane
- Chick Morrison as Police official
- Harry Edmondson as The Sheriff
