= David Gray's Estate =

- Starring: Sydney Ayres; Charlotte Burton
- Distributed by: Mutual Film Corporation
- Release date: April 22, 1914
- Country: United States
- Languages: Silent; English intertitles

David Gray's Estate is a 1914 American silent short drama film starring Charlotte Burton, Sydney Ayres, Chick Morrison, Jack Richardson, Caroline Cooke, Vivian Rich and Harry Van Meter.
