= The Coming of the Padres =

1914 film

- Directed by: Lorimer Johnston
- Starring: Sydney Ayres; Perry Banks; Louise Lester; Jacques Jaccard; Jack Richardson; Vivian Rich; Harry van Meter
- Distributed by: Mutual Film
- Release date: March 21, 1914
- Country: United States
- Languages: Silent; English intertitles

The Coming of the Padres is a 1914 American short silent Western film directed by Lorimer Johnston. The film stars Sydney Ayres, Perry Banks, Louise Lester, Jacques Jaccard, Jack Richardson, Vivian Rich, and Harry van Meter. Motography reported that the film would be "pictorially reproducing the founding of the Santa Barbara Mission by Padre Junipero Serra. [...] The production will not be an exclusively religious one, but will introduce much of interest of early California life."

== Reception ==
A very positive review in The Moving Picture World wrote: " This is a beautiful offering, historical in nature. The bicennial of the birth of Father Serra who celebrated his first mass at Santa Barbara Mission, when California was a Spanish colony. It is impressive. The religious rites introduced are incidental to the dramatic story."
