= A Man's Way =

- Directed by: Sydney Ayres
- Written by: Sallie P. Newsum
- Starring: Charlotte Burton; Charlotte Burton; Louise Lester
- Distributed by: Mutual Film
- Release date: July 20, 1914
- Country: United States
- Languages: Silent film English intertitles

A Man's Way is a 1914 American silent short film directed by Sydney Ayres, starring William Garwood, Charlotte Burton and Louise Lester.

The film has two reels and was released on July 20, 1914.

== Plot ==
Henry and Louise had gone through college together. Afterward, Henry went out to pursue his career, that of a geologist, meanwhile let ting business gradually crowd out Louise, who never forgot to love him. On a vacation Henry came in contact with an old mountaineer and his young granddaughter, Gladys, a sweet, girlish product of the mountains. Soon interest grew to infatuation. Career was forgotten. They were married and very happy for a while, but Henry's ambition again came to the front, and he decided to go back to the place of his work. In the city, Henry steadily followed in the footsteps of success, shaking off, for a time, the thoughts of his child-wife, off in the mountains with her old grandfather.

Louise, the girl who had always loved him, soon realized the hopelessness of her love. Gladys, back in the mountains, was broken hearted. Louise's unrequited love for Henry undermined her health and she had to be sent up into the mountains to regain her strength. One day she heard a melody; she followed the sound and came upon Gladys. A prank of Providence brought together two women whose hearts were given to one man. The two became fast friends. Meanwhile Henry was successful, but not happy. Thoughts of his child wife came until finally he started for her. She was gone. For five years he searched to no avail. She sings at a big reception. By a strange coincidence, Harry comes to the same reception. He is greatly affected by the singing, but does not recognize in this cultured woman his little mountain Gladys. She recognizes him, but controls herself. After the solo she goes into the garden. He starts to follow. He watches, and as this woman battles with herself, the old crude instincts return—she tugs at her ear. Henry recognizes her through this mannerism. He goes to her—his wife—but she spurns him.

Louise, who is present, stands a witness to the scene, and realizes that the man she loves pleads for the love of another. Gladys is adamant. Henry leaves her. Louise's love for Henry forces her to him. He pours out his story to her, not knowing that every word is a wound. Louise, realizing now that her love is hopeless, leaves him. She goes to Gladys and says, "I saw all; you must go to him." Gladys will not relent, so Louise, desperate in her love for the man and her wish for his happiness, lets out the secret that Henry is the man she has loved and begs Gladys for the sake of her love to go to him. Gladys loves Henry deeply. Her pride is broken by Louise's magnanimity, and husband and wife are reconciled.

== Cast ==
- Charlotte Burton
- William Garwood
- Louise Lester
- Jack Richardson
- Vivian Rich
- Harry Van Meter

== Reception ==
In a positive review, Motography said, "While without a doubt the setting stands out above all else in this picture there is a story told within it that by far surpasses many of the so-called 'screen masterpieces' of today for it not only presents a different style of hero from that the public is used to but illustrates a little sidelight of life, the working of a man's ambition and love against each other. Three characters, portrayed by William Garwood, Vivian Rich and Charlotte Burton, carry practically the entire story and each of the players has succeeded in making a real flesh and blood person of the role they interpret."

The Moving Picture World criticized the film's screenwriting, calling it "not clear-cut and fails to get to its destination convincingly". The journal praised the other aspects of the film, stating, "The camera work, including some perfect double exposures, is highly commendable and there are some lovely scenes in it. The general handling and the acting are fine." The Motion Picture News agreed, writing, "Beautiful scenes mark this absorbing story".
