= Destinies Fulfilled =

- Directed by: Lorimer Johnston
- Written by: Marc E. Jones
- Starring: Charlotte Burton; Sydney Ayres; Jacques Jaccard; Violet Neitz; Joseph Knight; Louise Lester
- Distributed by: Mutual Film
- Release date: January 12, 1914
- Country: United States
- Languages: Silent film English intertitles

Destinies Fulfilled is a 1914 American silent drama film directed by Lorimer Johnston. The film stars Charlotte Burton, Sydney Ayres, Jacques Jaccard, Violet Neitz, Joseph Knight, Louise Lester, Jack Richardson, Vivian Rich, and Harry Van Meter.

== Production ==
The film is described as the first "3 reel offering of American Film Manufacturing"

== Reception ==
A review in Motography praised Ayres's performance in particular.
