= The Black Ghost Bandit =

1915 American short Western film

- Directed by: Tom Ricketts
- Starring: Jack Richardson; Louise Lester; Harry Van Meter; Vivian Rich
- Distributed by: Mutual Film
- Release date: January 13, 1915
- Country: United States
- Languages: Silent; English intertitles

The Black Ghost Bandit is a 1915 American short silent Western film directed by Tom Ricketts. The film stars Jack Richardson, Louise Lester, Harry Van Meter, Vivian Rich, Reaves Eason, and Joseph Knight.

== Cast ==
- Jack Richardson as Brand - the Black Ghost Bandit
- Vivian Rich as Nell Brand
- Louise Lester as Mrs. Palmer
- Reaves Eason as Mr. Palmer
- Harry Van Meter as Sheriff Jordan
- Joseph Knight as Stage driver
- John Sampson as Guard
