= The Unmasking =

- Written by: M.H. McKinstry (Story)
- Starring: William Garwood; Harry De Vere; Jack Richardson; Vivian Rich; Louise Lester; Charlotte Burton; Harry Van Meter
- Distributed by: Universal Film Manufacturing Company
- Release date: June 17, 1914
- Country: United States
- Languages: Silent film English intertitles

The Unmasking is a 1914 American silent short film starring William Garwood, Harry De Vere, Jack Richardson Vivian Rich and Louise Lester, Charlotte Burton, and Harry Van Meter.

== Cast ==
- William Garwood as Harold Clark
- Harry Van Meter as John Dayton
- Harry De Vere as Judge Morrow
- Jack Richardson as William Thornby
- Vivian Rich as Clare Morrow
- Louise Lester as Clare's mother
- Charlotte Burton as Adele Hamilton
