= At the Potter's Wheel =

- Directed by: Lorimer Johnston
- Starring: Charlotte Burton; Sydney Ayres; Caroline Cooke; Louise Lester; Jack Richardson; Vivian Rich
- Distributed by: Mutual Film
- Release date: January 29, 1914
- Country: United States
- Languages: Silent film English intertitles

At the Potter's Wheel is a 1914 American silent short drama film directed by Lorimer Johnston. The film stars Charlotte Burton, Sydney Ayres, Caroline Cooke, Louise Lester, Jack Richardson and Vivian Rich.

== Plot ==
At a pottery located at Suresne, a small town near Paris, France, potters and decorators are seen at work and a vase is made on the potter's wheel.

Among the girls employed in the decorating of the porcelain is Vera Nemours, a poor girl who is doing most artistic work. She is living with an old woman, Jeanne Eaton, who has become so feeble with age and infirmities that she is no longer useful, and the master of the works, Jean Montparnasse, finally discharges her.

She returns to her poor lodgings in despair. Montparnasse has conceived a violent passion for Vera, which culminates when he attempts to seize her violently. Roual Nevers, a young artist who is the chief designer for the pottery, sees the predicament in which Vera is placed and knocks down the villain. A beautiful vase which we see made on the wheel, put in the oven and baked, is brought to Vera to be decorated. A girl who really loves Montparnasse is jealous of his attentions to Vera, and as Vera goes to the window to admire the beauty of the vase, the girl trips her. She falls and the vase is shattered to pieces. Vera returns to her squalid home hopeless, finding her aged companion in despair; they agree to die, as the future holds no hope.

They turn on the gas and are to die in each other's arms. Montparnasse comes to the room to obtain possession of the girl. He attempts to break in the door, but is admitted by the old lady temporarily dissuaded from her purpose, and he attacks the girl. The old woman, with a fierce return of strength, grapples with him and in the struggle which follows he falls against the low window and crashes through, falling into the street, six stories below. Roual, hearing Vera's screams, rushes to her protection and says he will care for their futures, so from the chaos of her present the future looks bright and full of promise of content.
