= The Certainty of Man =

- Starring: Charlotte Burton; Sydney Ayres; Charles Morrison
- Distributed by: Mutual Film
- Release date: April 1, 1914
- Country: United States
- Languages: Silent film English intertitles

The Certainty of Man is a 1914 American short (one-reel) silent film with a Western setting, starring Charlotte Burton, Sydney Ayres, Charles Morrison, Jack Richardson, Vivian Rich and Harry von Meter.

== Cast ==
- Sydney Ayres as Fred, a cock-sure deputy sheriff
- Charles Morrison as Davis, the Sheriff
- Jack Richardson as Allen, the Geologist
- Harry von Meter as Pennington the postmaster
- Vivian Rich as Lucille, Pennington's ward
- Charlotte Burton as Mary, Lucille's mother
