= The Rose of San Juan =

1913 film

- Directed by: Sydney Ayres
- Produced by: Lorimer Johnston
- Starring: Sydney Ayres; Charlotte Burton; Louise Lester
- Production company: Flying "A" Studios
- Distributed by: Mutual Film
- Release date: December 27, 1913
- Running time: 10 minutes (1-reel)
- Country: United States
- Language: Silent with English intertitles

The Rose of San Juan is a 1913 American silent-era short drama film starring Sydney Ayres, Charlotte Burton, and Louise Lester. It was directed by Ayres for the American Film Manufacturing Company. The Rose of San Juan was distributed by Mutual Film. Prints and/or fragments were found in the Dawson Film Find in 1978.

== Plot ==
The film's hero, played by Ayres, falls in love with a Mexican girl, much to the anger of a rival suitor.

== Cast ==
- Sydney Ayres
- Charlotte Burton
- Caroline Cooke
- Charles Cummings
- Jacques Jaccard
- Louise Lester
- Charles Morrison
- Jack Richardson
- Vivian Rich
- Harry Van Meter

== Production ==
The film was shot in and around the historic adobes in Santa Barbara, California, where the AFMC was based.
