= The Call of the Traumerei =

1914 silent short film

- Directed by: Jacques Jaccard; Lorimer Johnston
- Starring: Charlotte Burton; Sydney Ayres; Caroline Cooke
- Distributed by: Mutual Film
- Release date: March 19, 1914
- Country: United States
- Languages: Silent film English intertitles

The Call of the Traumerei is a 1914 American silent short drama film directed by Jacques Jaccard and Lorimer Johnston. The film stars Charlotte Burton, Sydney Ayres, Caroline Cooke, Jack Richardson, Vivian Rich, and Harry Van Meter.
