= Billy's Rival =

- Directed by: Sydney Ayres
- Written by: Anita Loos
- Starring: William Garwood; Harry von Meter; Louise Lester; Vivian Rich
- Distributed by: Mutual Film
- Release date: October 7, 1914
- Country: United States
- Languages: Silent film English intertitles

Billy's Rival is a 1914 American silent short film directed by Sydney Ayres, starring William Garwood and Louise Lester.

== Cast ==
- William Garwood as Billy Manning
- Louise Lester as His wife
- Vivian Rich as Mary, his wife
- Jack Richardson as Mary's father
- Harry von Meter as Thomas Day
- Charlotte Burton as Mrs. Day, his invalid mother
