= Trapped in a Forest Fire =

- Directed by: Gilbert P. Hamilton
- Written by: Jacques Jaccard
- Produced by: American Film Manufacturing Company
- Starring: Charlotte Burton; Sydney Ayres; Jacques Jaccard; Violt Neitz; Louise Lester; Jack Richardson; Vivian Rich; Harry von Meter
- Distributed by: Mutual Film
- Release date: December 8, 1913
- Running time: 1 reel
- Country: United States
- Languages: Silent film English intertitles

Trapped in a Forest Fire is a 1913 American silent short film directed by Gilbert P. Hamilton starring Charlotte Burton, Sydney Ayres, Jacques Jaccard, Violt Neitz, Louise Lester, Jack Richardson, Vivian Rich, and Harry von Meter.

== Cast ==
- Sydney Ayres - Robert Newton
- Vivian Rich - Vera Redmond
- Harry von Meter - Thomas Nevins
- Charlotte Burton - Inez Tremain
- Jack Richardson - Jack Graham
- Violet Knights -Sally Stanton (*Violet Neitz)
- Jacques Jaccard - James Redmond
- Louise Lester - Mrs. Newton, Robert's Mother

== See also ==
- List of firefighting films
