= Cameo of the Yellowstone =

1914 film

- Directed by: Sydney Ayres
- Written by: M.H. McKinstry (story)
- Starring: William Garwood; Harry De Vere
- Distributed by: Mutual Film Corporation
- Release date: July 6, 1914
- Running time: Short
- Country: United States
- Languages: Silent; English intertitles

Cameo of the Yellowstone is a 1914 American short silent Western film directed by Sydney Ayres starring William Garwood and Harry De Vere. It is described as a two-parts drama.

== Cast ==
- William Garwood as Cameo, a cowpuncher
- Harry De Vere
- Louise Lester
- Joseph Melville
- George Morrison
- Jack Richardson
- Vivian Rich
- Harry von Meter
