= The Taming of Sunnybrook Nell =

1914 film

- Directed by: Sydney Ayres
- Written by: Harry Wulze (story)
- Starring: William Garwood; Louise Lester
- Distributed by: Mutual Film
- Release date: September 25, 1914
- Country: United States
- Languages: Silent film English intertitles

The Taming of Sunnybrook Nell is a 1914 American silent short drama film directed by Sydney Ayres, written by Harry Wulze and starring William Garwood, Louise Lester and Vivian Rich.

== Cast ==
- William Garwood as Steve, a woodcutter
- Louise Lester as Mrs. Durkin
- Vivian Rich as Sunnybrook Nell, his daughter
- Jack Richardson as Clifford Durkin
- Harry von Meter as Old Clon, a mountaineer
