= Break, Break, Break (film) =

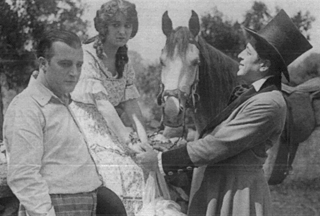
- Still from Break, Break, Break
- Directed by: Harry A. Pollard
- Written by: Sydney Ayres
- Starring: William Garwood; Louise Lester
- Production company: American Film Manufacturing Company
- Distributed by: Mutual Film Corporation
- Release date: September 9, 1914
- Running time: Short
- Country: United States
- Languages: Silent film English intertitles

Break, Break, Break is a 1914 American silent short film directed by Harry A. Pollard. A period drama written by Sydney Ayres, the film starred William Garwood and Louise Lester.

== Plot ==
It was described by Moving Picture World shortly after its release:

A pretty picture telling an idyillic love story; it should go very well; for, though it depends on sentiment rather than on thrilling dramatic suspense, it holds the attention strongly and is filled with the atmosphere of the good, old-time stories and poems. The costumes are of the mid-Victorian period in rural England. Many of its scenes are as charming as good pictures. The acting is also excellent quality. Vivian Rich is the heroine; Harry Von Meter, the hero, and Jack Richardson, the light villain. Much of the action is among the hay fields and then the seashore.

Break, Break, Break was a single-reel film produced by the American Film Manufacturing Company and released on September 9, 1914 through the Mutual Film Corporation, which distributed 58 prints.

== Cast ==
- B. Reeves Eason as Grandfather Day
- William Garwood as Tom Day, a son of the People
- Louise Lester as Mary Elizabeth Day, Tom's mother
- Jack Richardson as Dan Moore, a son of the Rich
- Vivian Rich as June, the adopted daughter
- Harry von Meter as Squire Moore, wealth land owner

== Production ==
The title comes from a poem by Tennyson.
