= True Western Hearts =

1914 film

- Directed by: Lorimer Johnston
- Written by: J. Russell O'Leary
- Starring: Sydney Ayres; Helen Armstrong; Jacques Jaccard; Louise Lester; Joseph Knight; Jack Richardson; Harry Van Meter
- Distributed by: Mutual Film
- Release date: February 7, 1914
- Running time: 1 reel
- Country: United States
- Languages: Silent; English intertitles

True Western Hearts is a 1914 American short silent Western film directed by J. Russell O'Leary. The film stars Sydney Ayres, Helen Armstrong, Jacques Jaccard, Louise Lester, Joseph Knight, Jack Richardson, and Harry von Meter.
