= Redbird Wins =

1914 film

- Directed by: Sydney Ayres
- Written by: Reaves Eason (Story)
- Starring: Harry von Meter; Perry Banks; William Garwood
- Distributed by: Mutual Film
- Release date: November 16, 1914
- Country: United States
- Languages: Silent film English intertitles

Redbird Wins is a 1914 American silent short drama film directed by Sydney Ayres, starring Harry von Meter, Vivian Rich, Perry Banks and William Garwood.

The film is described as 2 -reel drama by Variety.

The Moving Picture World published an extensive summary of the plot.

== Cast ==
- Harry von Meter as Colonel James Dinwidty
- Vivian Rich as Fern, his daughter
- Perry Banks as Tom, the butler
- Reaves Eason as Ray Connors
- William Garwood as Philip Pierpont
- Louise Lester as Negro mammy
- Jack Richardson

== Production ==
The Moving Picture World noted that the film "has been delayed on account of the injury which Mr. Richardson received in an automobile accident"
