= The Cocoon and the Butterfly =

- Directed by: Sydney Ayres
- Written by: M.H. McKinstry (Story)
- Starring: William Garwood; Louise Lester
- Distributed by: Mutual Film
- Release date: September 14, 1914
- Running time: Short
- Country: United States
- Languages: Silent film English intertitles

The Cocoon and the Butterfly is a 1914 American silent short drama film directed by Sydney Ayres, starring William Garwood and Louise Lester.

== Cast ==
- William Garwood
- Louise Lester
- Afton Minear
- Jack Richardson
- Vivian Rich
- William Tedmarsh
- Harry Van Meter
