= The Oath of Pierre =

1913 film

- Directed by: Sydney Ayres
- Written by: M.H. McKinstry
- Starring: William Garwood; Charlotte Burton
- Distributed by: Mutual Film
- Release date: June 8, 1914
- Country: United States
- Languages: Silent film English intertitles

The Oath of Pierre is a 1914 American silent short film directed by Sydney Ayres starring William Garwood and Charlotte Burton. The film was based on a story by M.H. McKinstry.The film was presented as having 2 reels and having been "enacted in primeval forests".

== Plot ==
The Moving Picture World published a detailed summary of the plot.

== Cast ==
- Charlotte Burton as Julia Naughton, of the border line
- William Garwood as Pierre Dorchet, a young trapper
- King Clark as John Kent, his assistant
- Louise Lester as Mrs. Naughton
- Jack Richardson as Calvin Crow, government surveyor
- Vivian Rich as Nanette Dorchet, Pierre's sister
- Harry von Meter as Papineau, friend of Pierre
