= The Navy Aviator =

- Directed by: Sydney Ayres
- Written by: Lorimer Johnston
- Starring: Sydney Ayres; Caroline Cooke; Jack Richardson; Vivian Rich
- Distributed by: Mutual Film Corporation
- Release date: May 13, 1914
- Country: United States
- Languages: Silent film English intertitles

The Navy Aviator is a 1914 American silent short drama film written by Lorimer Johnston and directed by Sydney Ayres. The film stars Ayres, Caroline Cooke, Jack Richardson, Vivian Rich, and Harry von Meter.

The film, set in Mexico, is described by The Bioscope as a "good war and adventure story".
