= A Heart of Gold =

- Directed by: Tom Ricketts
- Written by: Elizabeth R. Carpenter
- Starring: Harry von Meter; Jack Richardson; Reaves Eason
- Distributed by: Mutual Film Corporation
- Release date: February 10, 1915
- Country: United States
- Languages: Silent film English intertitles

A Heart of Gold is a 1915 American silent romantic drama short film directed by Tom Ricketts starring Harry von Meter, Reaves Eason, Louise Lester, Jack Richardson, and Vivian Rich.

== Cast ==
- Harry von Meter as Jim
- Jack Richardson as Jake Price
- Reaves Eason as Fred
- Vivian Rich as Mary Price, Jake's Wife
- Louise Lester as Mrs. Carr
