= Jail Birds =

- Directed by: Sydney Ayres
- Written by: M.H. McKinstry (story)
- Starring: William Garwood; Jack Richardson; Charlotte Burton
- Distributed by: Mutual Film
- Release date: October 12, 1914
- Country: United States
- Languages: Silent film English intertitles

Jail Birds is a 1914 American silent short drama film directed by Sydney Ayres starring William Garwood, Jack Richardson, and Charlotte Burton.

== Cast ==
- William Garwood as Robert MacFarlane, a young attorney
- Jack Richardson as Dick Patterson
- Charlotte Burton as Mrs. Patterson
- B. Reeves Eason as Attorney Bright
- Louise Lester as Mrs. Carson
- Vivian Rich as Audrey Austin
- Harry von Meter as Harry Dupree, a crook
- Thomas Gullifer as Judge O'Brien
