= Nature's Touch =

1914 film

- Directed by: Sydney Ayres
- Written by: M.H. McKinstry
- Starring: William Garwood; Jack Richardson
- Distributed by: Mutual Film
- Release date: July 1, 1914
- Country: United States
- Languages: Silent film English intertitles

Nature's Touch is a 1914 American silent short film directed by Sydney Ayres, starring William Garwood and Jack Richardson. The film also casts Vivian Rich, who recalls she had to dress as a boy and perform various stunts for the occasion.

== Cast ==
- William Garwood
- Louise Lester
- Joseph Melville
- Billie O'Brien
- Jack Richardson
- Vivian Rich
- Harry von Meter
