= The Story of the Olive =

- Directed by: Sydney Ayres
- Written by: Caroline Frances Cooke
- Starring: Sydney Ayres; Perry Banks; Edith Borella; Caroline Frances Cooke
- Distributed by: Mutual Film Corporation
- Release date: May 6, 1914
- Country: United States
- Languages: Silent film English intertitles

The Story of the Olive is a 1914 American silent popular short drama film written by and starring Caroline Frances Cooke. The film also stars Sydney Ayres (who directed it), Perry Banks, Edith Borella, Jack Richardson, Vivian Rich, and Harry Van Meter.

== Cast ==
- Jack Richardson as Ortega
- Caroline Frances Cooke as Ortega's lover
- Vivian Rich as Mercedes
- Harry Van Meter as Don Jose de Cabrillo
- Sydney Ayres
- Perry Banks
- Edith Borella

== Reception ==
Motography found the film was "a strong drama with a quasi-educational interest".
