= Their Worldly Goods =

1914 film

- Directed by: Sydney Ayres
- Written by: Paul L. Feltus
- Starring: William Garwood; Edith Borella; Charlotte Burton
- Distributed by: Mutual Film Corporation
- Release date: August 19, 1914
- Running time: 1000 feet (1 reel, maximum 15 minutes)
- Country: United States
- Languages: Silent film English intertitles

Their Worldly Goods is a 1914 American silent short film directed by Sydney Ayres. Starring William Garwood, Edith Borella, Charlotte Burton, Jack Richardson, Louise Lester, Vivian Rich and Harry Van Meter.

The film was released on August 19, 1914.
