= A Golden Rainbow =

- Directed by: Tom Ricketts
- Starring: Perry Banks; Louise Lester; Jack Richardson
- Distributed by: Mutual Film Corporation (USA)
- Release date: 1915
- Country: United States
- Languages: Silent film English intertitles

A Golden Rainbow is a 1915 American silent short film directed by Tom Ricketts, and starring Perry Banks, Louise Lester, Harry von Meter, and Jack Richardson.
