= Does It End Right? =

- Directed by: Sydney Ayres
- Written by: M.H. McKinstry
- Starring: William Garwood; Charlotte Burton; Louise Lester; Vivian Rich
- Distributed by: Mutual Film Corporation
- Release date: July 29, 1914
- Country: United States
- Languages: Silent film English intertitles

Does It End Right? is a 1914 American silent short drama film directed by Sydney Ayres. It stars William Garwood, Charlotte Burton, Louise Lester, Vivian Rich, Jack Richardson and Harry von Meter.
