= The Smuggler's Cave =

1915 film

- Directed by: B. Reeves Eason
- Starring: Jack Richardson
- Distributed by: Mutual Film
- Release date: October 29, 1915
- Country: United States
- Language: Silent with English intertitles

The Smuggler's Cave is a 1915 American short drama film directed by B. Reeves Eason.

== Cast ==
- Jack Richardson
- Vivian Rich
- Walter Spencer
