= Hearts in Shadow =

1915 film

- Directed by: B. Reeves Eason
- Starring: Louise Lester
- Production company: American Film Manufacturing Company
- Release date: October 1, 1915
- Country: United States
- Languages: Silent; English intertitles

Hearts in Shadow is a 1915 American comedy drama short film directed by B. Reeves Eason about an unemployed single mother.

== Cast ==
- Jack Richardson
- Vivian Rich
- Louise Lester
