= His Faith in Humanity =

1914 film

- Directed by: Sydney Ayres
- Written by: J.E. Hungerford (story)
- Starring: William Garwood; Louise Lester; Vivian Rich
- Distributed by: Mutual Film
- Release date: September 23, 1914
- Running time: Short
- Country: United States
- Languages: Silent film English intertitles

His Faith in Humanity is a 1914 American silent short film directed by Sydney Ayres, starring William Garwood, Louise Lester and Vivian Rich.

== Cast ==
- William Garwood as Jim Marsh
- Louise Lester as His wife
- Vivian Rich as Mrs. Van Zandt
- Harry von Meter as Robert Sands
- Reaves Eason
