= Golden Rainbow =

Golden Rainbow may refer to:

- Golden Rainbow (musical), a 1968 musical
- Golden Rainbow (TV series), a South Korean TV series
- A Golden Rainbow, a 1915 American silent short film
- "Golden Rainbow", a song by Seals and Crofts from the 1975 album I'll Play for You
- Drosera microphylla, a carnivorous plant endemic to Western Australia
