= The Assayer of Lone Gap =

1915 film

- Directed by: B. Reeves Eason
- Starring: Perry Banks
- Distributed by: Mutual Film
- Release date: December 4, 1915
- Country: United States
- Languages: Silent; English intertitles

The Assayer of Lone Gap is a 1915 short film directed by B. Reeves Eason.

== Cast ==
- Perry Banks
- Louise Lester
- Jack Richardson
- Vivian Rich
- Walter Spencer
