= Sparrow of the Circus =

- Written by: M.H. McKinstry (Story)
- Starring: Reaves Eason; Harry von Meter
- Distributed by: Mutual Film
- Release date: June 10, 1914
- Running time: Short
- Country: United States
- Languages: Silent film English intertitles

Sparrow of the Circus is a 1914 American silent short drama film based on a story by M.H. McKinstry. It was said to be: "Pathetic tale of the ring and the elopement of the clown's wife with a rascally ring master [Jackson Crane]. Sparrow is comforted by his friend Pantaloon and shows no sign of his secret grief. His brave patience and the love of his child bring about a touching reunion." Its release was for six months. (Note: "Like many women who long for a life of ease and grandeur the Princess Ora listens to the promises of Jackson Crane and unthinkingly, on the impulse of the moment, she consents to take her little girl and leave with the ringmaster for the promise of a fine life in a different atmosphere. Leaving a farewell note to her husband, she goes with Crane. The elopement of his wife and child with the ringmaster brings great grief to the heart of Sparrow, who is comforted by his clown friend, Pantaloon. To carry a tragedy in his soul, and comedy to the hearts of thousands, is the task Sparrow accomplishes, yet in the end, his fine manhood dominates the great wrong done him and the hand of Providence, kind ever to the suffering, rewards the patience of Sparrow by a happy reunion." Moving Picture World synopsis.)

== Cast ==
- Reaves Eason
- Jack Richardson
- Vivian Rich
- Harry von Meter
- Billie O'Brien
