= Profit from Loss =

1915 film

- Directed by: B. Reeves Eason
- Starring: Vivian Rich
- Distributed by: Mutual Film
- Release date: October 15, 1915
- Country: United States
- Languages: Silent; English intertitles

Profit from Loss is a 1915 American short silent Western film directed by B. Reeves Eason.

== Cast ==
- Vivian Rich
- Walter Spencer
- Jack Richardson
- Louise Lester
