= The Belle of Bar-Z Ranch =

1912 film

- Directed by: Thomas Ricketts
- Produced by: David Horsley
- Starring: Harry Van Meter; Vivian Rich
- Distributed by: Universal Film Manufacturing Company
- Release date: June 10, 1912
- Country: United States
- Languages: Silent; English intertitles

The Belle of Bar-Z Ranch is a 1912 American silent short Western comedy film directed by Thomas Ricketts starring Harry Van Meter and Vivian Rich.

== Reception ==
The Moving Picture News said, "Excellently photographed and splendidly acted, The Belle of Bar-Z Ranch is easily one of the best little comedies produced [by] Nestor... Wonderful exterior scenes and exciting races make this picture-play... decidedly worth while."
