= The Newer Way =

1915 film

- Directed by: B. Reeves Eason
- Starring: Joseph Galbraith
- Distributed by: Mutual Film
- Release date: July 26, 1915
- Country: United States
- Languages: Silent; English intertitles

The Newer Way is a 1915 American short film directed by B. Reeves Eason.

== Cast ==
- Joseph Galbraith
- Louise Lester
- Jack Richardson
- Vivian Rich
