= The Bandit of Tropico =

- Produced by: David Horsley
- Starring: Harry von Meter; Vivian Rich
- Distributed by: Universal Film Manufacturing Company
- Release date: June 17, 1912
- Country: United States
- Languages: Silent films English intertitles

The Bandit of Tropico is a 1912 American silent short adventure film starring Harry von Meter as "The Bandit" and Vivian Rich his daughter.

== Plot ==
William Blake (Harry von Meter) plays a trusted citizen in Tropico, California, a town that has been recently plagued by stagecoach robberies. The sheriff, Jim Sherwood, seeks to find the bandit and pursues a relationship with Blake's daughter, Kitty (Vivian Rich). Little does Sherwood know that his love interest's father is also the bandit who he is hunting.
