= A Touch of Love =

A Touch of Love may refer to:

- A Touch of Love (1915 film), an American silent short drama directed by Tom Ricketts
- A Touch of Love (1969 film), a British drama directed by Waris Hussein
- "A Touch of Love", a song by Cleopatra from Comin' Atcha!
