= Mountain Mary =

1915 film

- Directed by: B. Reeves Eason
- Written by: William Parker
- Starring: Joseph Galbraith
- Distributed by: Mutual Film
- Release date: July 5, 1915
- Country: United States
- Languages: Silent; English intertitles

Mountain Mary is a 1915 American short film directed by B. Reeves Eason.

== Cast ==
- Joseph Galbraith
- Louise Lester
- Charles Newton
- Jack Richardson
- Vivian Rich
