= Sweet and Low (1914 film) =

- William Garwood, Bunny Lee (child), Lillian Lee, Mary Scott (nurse)
- Directed by: Sydney Ayres
- Written by: Alfred, Lord Tennyson (poem)
- Starring: William Garwood; Harry von Meter; Vivian Rich
- Distributed by: Mutual Film
- Release date: October 28, 1914
- Country: United States
- Languages: Silent film English intertitles

Sweet and Low is a 1914 American silent short drama film starring William Garwood, Harry von Meter, and Vivian Rich, directed by Sydney Ayres, and released by Mutual Film Corporation on October 28, 1914. The film is based upon the 1850 poem Lullaby/Sweet and Low by Alfred, Lord Tennyson.

The Moving Picture World described the film as "a very pretty story told in a charming way". The trade magazine went on to say it was sentimental and has a happy ending without an abundance of "harrowing things" being part of the plot. The child actress, Bunny Lee, was favorably mentioned; the magazine described it as a fine picture which would draw women and children to the theater as patrons.

The film industry magazine Motography also praised the child's performance. Motography also singled out the work of William Garwood in the film. Garwood, who was 30 years old at the time, was skillfully made up to assume the role of a much older man.

== Plot ==
Sad, lonely and unhappy, an old man sits in a city park, thinking about the past. A little girl comes up to him and takes his hand, asking him what is making him so sad. The child reminds him of his own lost little girl and the times of the past begin to flow through his memory. He had a happy life with a loving wife and baby daughter. But he wanted to give them more, so he headed West to the gold fields. The work was long and hard; he was able to keep going with the thought of what he could do for his wife and child. As he worked, he often recalled his wife singing Sweet and Low to their small daughter. After he had made his fortune, he headed home to his loved ones. When he arrived there, he found that his wife had died; his young daughter was considered orphaned after her death and was sent for adoption. He tried in vain to locate his daughter.

The pain of his memories shows on his face and the little girl is understanding; she climbs onto the park bench and hugs the old man to try to make him feel better. She then asks him to come with her because she lives just across the street. When they arrive at the house, he hears a woman singing Sweet and Low; it is all too much for him and he falls down on the porch. The little girl's mother comes to help him inside to a chair. After he enters the home, he realizes this woman is the image of his wife, Margaret and after all these years, he has finally found his daughter.

== Cast ==
William Garwood and Bunny Lee

- William Garwood as Bryan Kyam
- Vivian Rich as His wife
- Viola Gladwin as Their little girl
- Lillian Lee as Mrs. Esther
- Bunny Lee as Tressie Esther
- Mary Scott as Nurse
- Harry von Meter as Minister
