= Caroline Cooke =

American actress and writer (1875–1962)

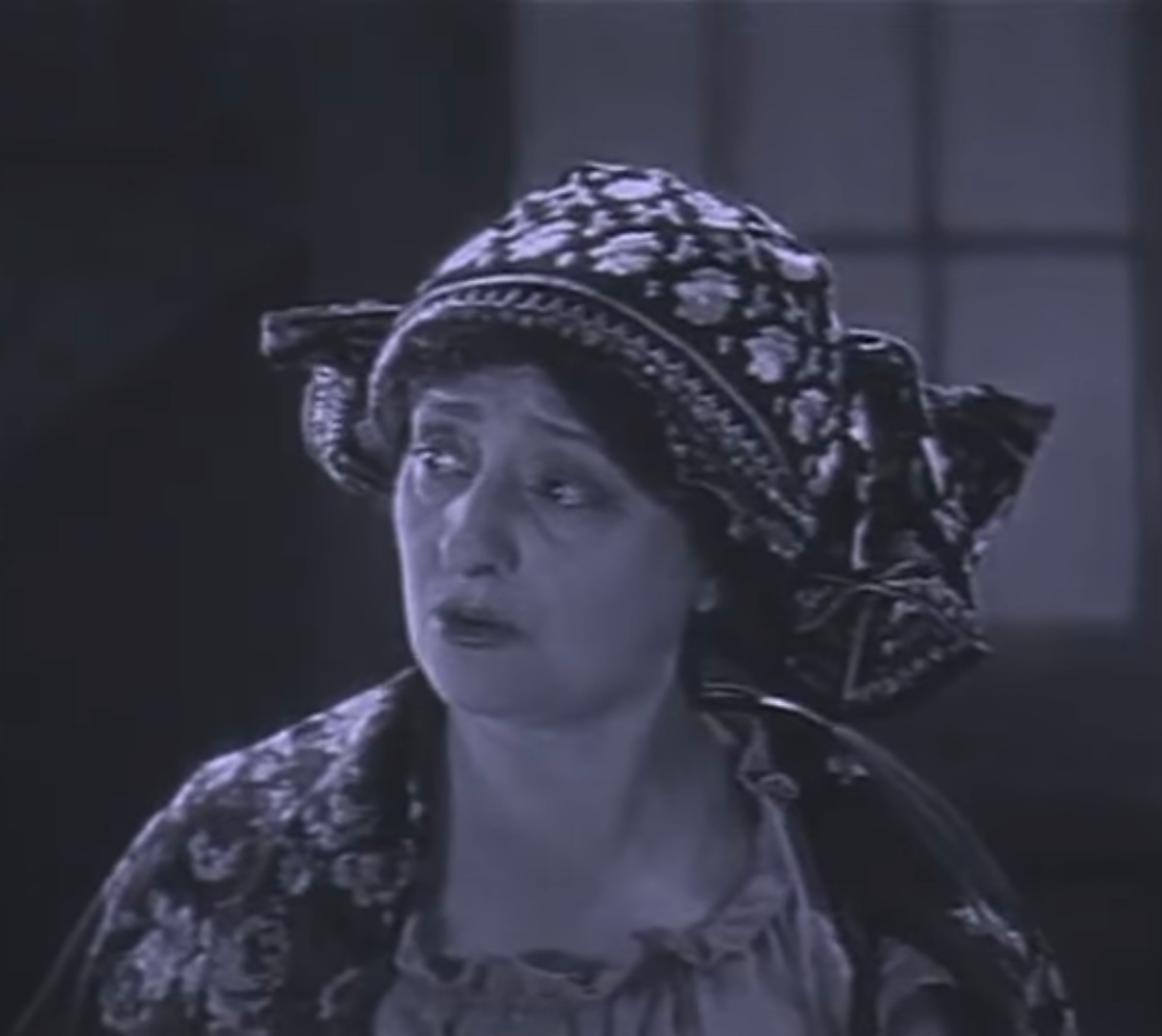
- Cooke in The Bells (1926)
- Born: Caroline Frances Cooke; December 29, 1875; Illinois, U.S.
- Died: July 8, 1962 (aged 86); Los Angeles, California, U.S.
- Occupations: Actress; screenwriter
- Years active: 1913–1939
- Spouse: Lorimer Johnston

Caroline Frances Cooke (December 29, 1875 – July 8, 1962) was an American silent film actress and screenwriter.

== Biography ==
=== Career ===
Cooke was signed in 1913 and starred in about 15 films between 1913 and 1916. She had two brief roles twenty years after that, in 1926 and 1939. In 1939 she appeared in the classic Son of Frankenstein playing the role of Mrs. Neumüller.

She starred with Charlotte Burton in films such as Rose of San Juan which was her first motion picture. In 1914, she wrote the script for The Story of the Olive.

She also appeared in the 1930 Our Gang short entitled "When the Wind Blows" where she played the mother of Jackie Cooper and Bobby "Wheezer" Hutchins.

== Filmography ==
Year	Title	Role	Other notes
1913	Rose of San Juan		Credited as Caroline Cooke
1913	The Sands of Time		Credited as Caroline Cooke
1913	Roses of Yesterday		Credited as Caroline Cooke
1913	A Daughter of the Confederacy		Credited as Caroline Cooke
1914	Destinies Fulfilled		Credited as Caroline Cooke
1914	At the Potter's Wheel		Credited as Caroline Cooke
1914	A Blowout at Santa Banana		Credited as Caroline Cooke
1914	The Cricket on the Hearth		Credited as Caroline Cooke, credited as writer
1914	The Call of the Traumerei		Credited as Caroline Cooke
1914	The Turning Point		Credited as Caroline Cooke
1914	The Last Supper		Credited as Caroline Cooke
1914	David Gray's Estate		Credited as Caroline Cooke
1914	The Story of the Olive	Ortegas lover	Credited as writer
1914	The Navy Aviator		Credited as Caroline Cooke
1914	Metamorphosis		Credited as Caroline Cooke
1914	The Envoy Extraordinary		
1915	The Missing Clue		Credited as Caroline Cooke
1916	The Island of Surprise	Mrs. Casselis	Credited as Caroline Cooke
1926	The Bells	Catharine	Credited as Caroline Frances Cooke
1939	Son of Frankenstein	Mrs. Neumüller	Credited as Caroline Cooke
