= The Strength o' Ten =

- Directed by: Tom Ricketts
- Written by: Clarence J. Harris
- Starring: William Garwood; Harry von Meter
- Distributed by: Mutual Film
- Release date: December 2, 1914
- Country: United States
- Languages: Silent film English intertitles

The Strength o' Ten is a 1914 American silent drama short film directed by Tom Ricketts. The film stars William Garwood and Harry von Meter.

== Plot ==
This was the plot summary filed with the Library of Congress for the original copyright:

Betty, the mountain girl, is pursued by the boys, but her grievous home life with a drunken father makes her test every admirer and at the point of drink they fall. Far away, Jep, a mountain lad, who lives with his dog, turns away for "big game" and enroute meets a hunter who tells of Betty. Jep loses thoughts for quarter quest, starts away to see the girl described. Klick almost reaches Betty's standard, but yields to temptation and because of unsteady hands, cannot rescue the father from a gully into which he has fallen. At daybreak, Betty reaches the spot, sees in Klick evidences of drink, while Jep arrives, rescues the father, carries him on his shoulders, winning admiration from Betty, and jealousy from Klick. Jep stays a while, leaves after Betty's invitation to come again, while a jealous Klick tells her Jep will drink like any of them if disappointed. He dares Betty to wear his silver ring, which she does, and later Jep comes and is put to a test by doubtful Betty. Jep's gallantry increases – as he leaves Betty, she follows to watch effect of test, and witnesses an encounter between Klick and Jep. Jep is finally set on by the jealous gang. Klick warns Betty and reaches the scene, when Jep, because of steady nerve and muscles, fights the entire half drunken gang. Betty leads him away followed by Klick who discloses the fact that Betty does not love him, and that he, Jep, is white and clean through.

== Cast ==
- William Garwood as Jep, the mountain youth
- Vivian Rich as Betty, the mountain girl
- Harry von Meter as Betty's father
- Louise Lester as Betty's mother
- Jack Richardson as Klick, leader of the boys
- Perry Banks as a young admirer of Betty
- Edith Borella
- King Clark
- B. Reeves Eason
