= A Good Business Deal =

1915 film

- Directed by: B. Reeves Eason
- Starring: Joseph Galbraith
- Distributed by: Mutual Film
- Release date: June 30, 1915
- Country: United States
- Languages: Silent; English intertitles

A Good Business Deal is a 1915 American short silent film directed by B. Reeves Eason.

== Cast ==
- Joseph Galbraith
- Jack Richardson
- Vivian Rich
