= Touch of Love =

Touch of Love, A Touch of Love, or The Touch of Love may refer to:

== Books ==
- A Touch of Love, by Helen Steiner Rice, 2007
- A Touch of Love, by Hugh Williams, 2000
- A Touch of Love, by Jonathan Coe, 1989
- A Touch of Love, by Barbara Cartland, 1977
- The Touch of Love, by Vanessa Grant, 1990
- A Touch of Love, by Phoebe Conn, 1997

== Film and television ==
- A Touch of Love (1969 film), a British film directed by Waris Hussein and adapted by Margaret Drabble from her 1965 novel The Millstone
- A Touch of Love (1915 film), an American silent short drama film directed by Tom Ricketts starring Vivian Rich, Harry Van Meter, and Charlotte Burton
- Nee Paata Madhuram The Touch of Love, Indian film with Roop Kumar Rathod

== Music ==
- Touch of Love, album by Kimiko Itoh, 1986
- Touch of Love, album by Sergei Georgievich Zakharov
- Touch of Love (album), by Twins, 2003
- A Touch Of Love, by Yoshiko Goto with Inaba & Nakamure Duo on the label Three Blind Mice, 1975
- Just a Touch of Love, fourth album by the American funk band Slave, 1979

=== Songs ===
- "Sweet Touch of Love", by Allen Toussaint
- "A Touch of Love", single by Cleopatra from Comin' Atcha!, 1998
- "The Touch of Love", by Kathy Linden, 1957
- "Just a Touch of Love" (song), 1991 single written by Robert Clivillés and performed by C+C Music Factory
