= Feast and Famine =

- Directed by: Sydney Ayres
- Written by: George A. Posner
- Starring: B. Reeves Eason; William Garwood
- Distributed by: Mutual Film Corporation
- Release date: July 8, 1914
- Country: United States
- Languages: Silent film English intertitles

Feast and Famine is a 1914 American silent short drama film directed by Sydney Ayres. Starring B. Reeves Eason, William Garwood, Harry von Meter, Jack Richardson and Vivian Rich.
