= In the Open (1914 film) =

1914 film

- Directed by: Sydney Ayres
- Written by: J. Edward Hungerford
- Starring: William Garwood; Louise Lester
- Distributed by: Mutual Film
- Release date: October 12, 1914
- Country: United States
- Languages: Silent film English intertitles

In the Open is a 1914 American silent short film directed by Sydney Ayres, starring William Garwood and Louise Lester.

== Plot ==
This was the plot summary published in The Moving Picture World for October 10, 1914:

In a covered wagon drawn by two scrawny horses, Sancbo Mendez, a Mexican, makes camp near a settler's homestead. With him is his step-daughter, Concbita, whom he mistreats. Ben Carroll, the homesteader, lives alone with his mother, who is ill. She suffers a slight relapse and Ben goes for a doctor. On the way he protects Concbita from her step-father's brutality and knocks him down. Learning the girl's story, and sorry for her, Ben takes her to his shack and leaves her in care of his mother. He then resumes his journey, after stopping long enough to warn Mendez not to molest her. Meanwhile, the sick woman, slightly recovering, shows Concbita some old keepsakes, including some valuable jewelry. Mendez, lurking about, peers through the window. Forcing his way into the shack stranger and leads through various parts of the camp. Tbe stranger is cornered at one end of the trestle on the electric construction railroad. Here be starts an electric engine across as bis pursuers are after him. They are about to be swept off to the rocks below. Just then the blacksmith's child, who has been hiding on the work train, cries out. The stranger sees her going to her death. As the only way to stop the engine he pulls down the trolley wire, stopping the engine, but resulting in his own death.

== Cast ==
- William Garwood as Ben Carroll, a young ranchman
- Louise Lester as his mother
- Harry von Meter as Mendez, a Mexican
- Vivian Rich as Conchita, his stepdaughter
- Reaves Eason as a doctor
- Joe Knight as Deputy Sheriff
