= The Substitute Minister =

1915 film

- Directed by: B. Reeves Eason
- Starring: Vivian Rich
- Distributed by: Mutual Film
- Release date: November 15, 1915
- Country: United States
- Languages: Silent; English intertitles

The Substitute Minister is a 1915 American short film directed by B. Reeves Eason.

== Cast ==
- Vivian Rich
- Roy Stewart
- Gayne Whitman
