= Old Enough to Be Her Grandpa =

- Directed by: Tom Ricketts
- Written by: Clarence J. Harris
- Starring: Charlotte Burton; William Garwood
- Distributed by: Mutual Film
- Release date: November 20, 1914
- Running time: Short
- Country: United States
- Languages: Silent film English intertitles

Old Enough to Be Her Grandpa is a 1914 American silent short comedy film directed by Tom Ricketts starring Charlotte Burton and William Garwood.

== Cast ==
- Charlotte Burton as Lilyan DeVoe
- William Garwood as Rollie, his grandson
- Jack Richardson as Stephen Barnard
- Vivian Rich as Lora
- Harry Van Meter
