= The Chicken Chaser =

1914 film

- Directed by: Fatty Arbuckle
- Produced by: Mack Sennett
- Release date: April 2, 1914
- Country: United States
- Languages: Silent; English intertitles

The Chicken Chaser is a 1914 American short comedy film directed by and starring Fatty Arbuckle. The film was released in England as New England Lovers.

== Cast ==
- Roscoe "Fatty" Arbuckle as The Hired Man
- Charles Avery as The Sheriff
- Rube Miller as Cop
- William Hauber as Cop
- Edward F. Cline as Cop (as Eddie Cline)
- Gordon Griffith as Unknown Role (Uncredited)

== See also ==
- List of American films of 1914
- Fatty Arbuckle filmography
