= The Bluffers (film) =

1915 film

- Directed by: B. Reeves Eason
- Starring: Vivian Rich
- Distributed by: Mutual Film
- Release date: November 26, 1915
- Country: United States
- Languages: Silent; English intertitles

The Bluffers is a 1915 American short film directed by B. Reeves Eason.

== Plot ==
The stories revolved around the inhabitants of the fictitious land of 'Bluffoonia' and their ongoing struggle against the evil tyrant 'Clandestino' and his plans to destroy the forest in which they live.

== Cast ==
- Vivian Rich
- Gayne Whitman
