= Caught in a Flue =

1914 film

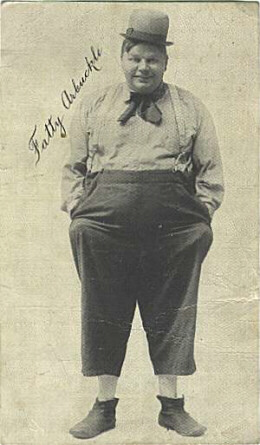
- Roscoe "Fatty" Arbuckle
- Directed by: Morgan Wallace
- Produced by: Mack Sennett
- Starring: Fatty Arbuckle
- Release date: August 22, 1914
- Country: United States
- Languages: Silent; English intertitles

Caught in a Flue is a 1914 short one-reel comedy film starring Fatty Arbuckle. It was directed by Morgan Wallace and produced by Mack Sennett. The film's alternative title was The Burglar Scare.

== Synopsis ==
After Bertie is kicked out of the house he tries to regain entry at the same time as a burglar, and the two get caught in the chimney together.

== Cast ==
- Roscoe "Fatty" Arbuckle as Bertie.

== See also ==
- List of American films of 1914
- Fatty Arbuckle filmography
