= Business Versus Love =

- Directed by: Tom Ricketts
- Written by: Sydney Ayres (Scenario)
- Starring: Edward Coxen; Winifred Greenwood; Harry von Meter; Jack Richardson
- Distributed by: Mutual Film
- Release date: July 22, 1914
- Country: United States
- Languages: Silent film English intertitles

Business Versus Love is a 1914 American silent short film directed by Tom Ricketts and written by Sydney Ayres. Starring Edward Coxen, Winifred Greenwood, Harry von Meter, and Jack Richardson.

The film was released on July 22, 1914.
