= A Touch of Love (1915 film) =

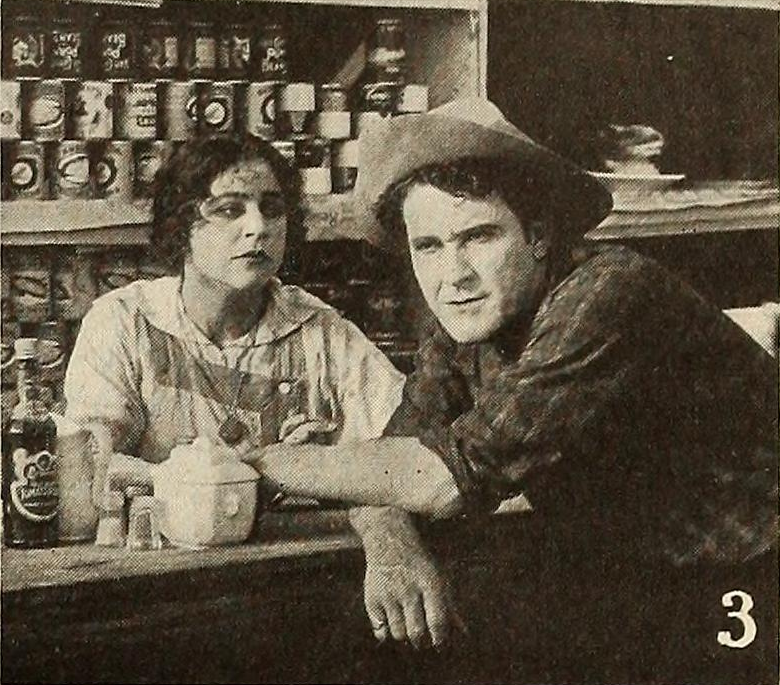
- Charlotte Burton and Harry von Meter in a publicity still
- Directed by: Tom Ricketts
- Starring: Vivian Rich; Harry Van Meter; Charlotte Burton
- Production company: American Film Company
- Distributed by: Mutual Film Corporation
- Release date: April 7, 1915
- Running time: 1 reel
- Country: United States
- Languages: Silent film English intertitles

A Touch of Love is a 1915 American silent short drama film directed by Tom Ricketts starring Vivian Rich, Harry von Meter, and Charlotte Burton. The film was produced by American Film Company and distributed by Mutual Film.

== Plot ==
According to a film magazine, "Martha is secretly in love with Jim, a young prospector; but as she is the warm-hearted friend and helper of everybody in the camp, he does not suspect her real feeling for him. Fannie, a beautiful dance hall girl, comes to town. She and Jim are mutually drawn to one another and Martha, believing that the newcomer is not worthy of Jim, warns him against becoming entangled with her. He answers that Fannie only needs someone really to love her. Jim and Fannie go for a ride and the dancer is thrown from her horse and severely hurt. They carry her to Martha. Martha stifles her first impulse to let the girl die and faithfully nurses her back to health. Learning of Fannie's unselfish efforts to support her mother and her child, over whom, in her helpless condition, she worries incessantly, Martha discovers that the dance hall girl's heart is in the right place. On her recovery she helps Fannie and Jim to take up life together."

== Cast ==
- Vivian Rich as Fannie
- Harry von Meter as Jim
- Charlotte Burton as Martha
- Reaves Eason as Bill
- Jack Richardson as Steve
- Louise Lester
