= Sir Galahad of Twilight =

1914 film

- Directed by: Sydney Ayres
- Written by: Marie Layet
- Starring: William Garwood; Vivian Rich
- Distributed by: Mutual Film
- Release date: October 26, 1914
- Country: United States
- Languages: Silent film English intertitles

Sir Galahad of Twilight is a 1914 American silent short drama film directed by Sydney Ayres and written by Marie Layet. The film stars Perry Banks, Reaves Eason, William Garwood, Jack Richardson, Harry von Meter, and Vivian Rich.

== Cast ==
- Harry von Meter as Jacques Lennaux
- Vivian Rich as Clotilde
- Perry Banks as Louis Dorchet
- Reaves Eason as Pedro
- William Garwood as Dick
- Jack Richardson as Jim
