= Harry De Vere =

American silent film actor

- Born: February 1, 1870; New York City, New York, U.S.
- Died: October 10, 1923 (age 53); Los Angeles, California, U.S.
- Occupation: Actor
- Years active: 1914–1923

Harry De Vere (February 1, 1870, New York City – October 10, 1923, Los Angeles) was an American silent film actor. His wife was a frolics stock performer, Della De Vere. He was signed by the Thanhouser Company based in New Rochelle, New York in 1914 and starred in about 70 films until his death in 1923, aged 53. He starred with William Garwood in films such as The Lost Sermon (1914). He also worked as business manager for the Marguerite Fields acting company, and for touring productions.

== Filmography ==
Year	Title	Role	Notes
1914	In the Footprints of Mozart	A Musician	Short
1914	The Lost Sermon	Old Nelse	Short
1914	The Unmasking	Judge Morrow	Short
1914	Mein Lieber Katrina Catches a Convict		Short
1914	The Cameo of the Yellowstone	Carson – the Neighbor	Short
1915	Young Romance	Silas Jenkins	
1915	Vengeance of the Wilds	John Hayden	
1915	I'm Glad My Boy Grew Up to Be a Soldier	James Warrington	
1916	Fruits of Desire	Johann	
1916	The Code of Marcia Gray	Harry Gray	
1916	The Ne'er Do Well	Detective Williams	
1916	The Man from Bitter Roots	Minor Role	
1916	Davy Crockett	James Vaughn	
1916	The Beast	Ralph Henshaw	
1916	The End of the Trail	John Robinson	
1917	His Sweetheart	Godfrey Kelland	
1917	A Tale of Two Cities	Gaspard	
1917	The Highway of Hope	Philip Garst	
1917	A Roadside Impresario	J. Stewart Vandergrift	
1918	True Blue	Buck	
1919	The Lamb and the Lion	James Graham	
1919	The Love Call	Bill Slade	
1919	The Last of the Duanes	Buck's uncle	
1919	Wings of the Morning	Sir Arthur Deane	
1920	The Orphan	Joe Sneed	
1920	The Joyous Trouble-Makers	Richard Stanton	
1921	Penny of Top Hill Trail	Louis Kingdon	
1922	The Jilt	Mr. Trenton	
1922	The Altar Stairs	Blundell	
1923	Around the World in Eighteen Days	Book Maker	
1923	The Social Buccaneer	Harvey Vail	
1923	The Phantom Fortune	Graham Alexander	
1923	The Shock	Olaf Wismer	
1923	The Hunchback of Notre Dame		Uncredited
1923	Ruth of the Range	J. Hamilton Camp	Serial, (final film role)
