= Harry von Meter =

American actor (1871–1956)

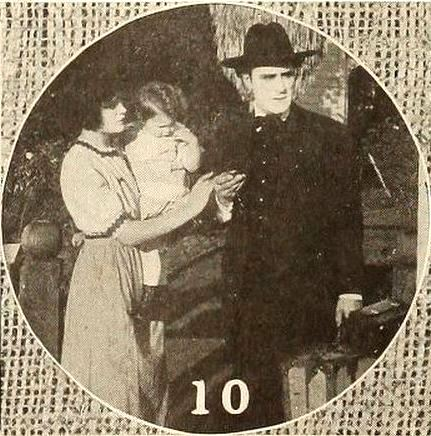
- Von Meter in still from In the Sunlight (1915)
- Born: March 20, 1871; Malta Bend, Missouri, U.S.
- Died: June 2, 1956 (aged 85); Sawtelle, Los Angeles, California, U.S.
- Other name: Harry van Meter
- Occupation: Actor
- Spouse: Isabelle Hayden

Harry von Meter (March 20, 1871 – June 2, 1956; sometimes credited as Harry van Meter) was an American actor of stage and silent film. He starred in about 200 films in the period from 1912 through 1929. He retired from acting just as sound films were beginning.

== Biography ==
Harry von Meter was born on March 20, 1871, in Malta Bend, Missouri. He was a member of the Rough Riders during the Spanish–American War. In his early career he was a stage actor for eighteen years. Von Meter worked for the Alcazar stock company at the Alcazar Theatre in San Francisco, California, followed by a move in 1908 to the Valencia stock company at the Valencia Theater in the same city. He married actress Isabelle Hayden in 1908 in Oakland, California.

He was signed by the Thanhouser Company based in New Rochelle, New York, in 1912, followed by spending a few months with Nestor Film Company in Hollywood, California, and then a few months with Universal Pictures. Around 1913, he moved to American Film Studios in Santa Barbara, California. He appeared in the 1923 film The Hunchback of Notre Dame as Monsignor Neufchatel.

He died in 1956 in Sawtelle, Los Angeles, California, at the age of 85.

== Filmography ==
=== 1912 ===
- Maud Muller
- The Power of Melody
- The Half-Breed's Way
- The Belle of Bar-Z Ranch
- The Bandit of Tropico

=== 1913 ===
- Rose of San Juan
- The Haunted House
- The Idol of Bonanza Camp
- The Oath of Pierre
- The Proof of the Man
- The Snake
- A Forest Romance
- For the Peace of Bear Valley
- Justice of the Wild
- In the Mountains of Virginia
- Calamity Anne's Dream
- At Midnight
- The Occult
- American Born
- Trapped in a Forest Fire
- Personal Magnetism

=== 1914 ===
- Destinies Fulfilled
- The Power of Light
- The Son of Thomas Gray
- A Blowout at Santa Banana
- True Western Hearts
- The Cricket on the Hearth
- The Crucible
- The Call of the Traumerei
- A Story of Little Italy
- The Coming of the Padres
- The Certainty of Man
- A Happy Coersion
- The Last Supper
- The Widow's Investment
- David Gray's Estate
- The Story of the Olive
- The Navy Aviator
- Beyond the City
- The Lost Sermon
- Metamorphosis
- Sparrow of the Circus
- The Unmasking
- Nature's Touch
- The Cameo of the Yellowstone
- Feast and Famine
- A Man's Way
- Business Versus Love
- Does It End Right?
- The Trap
- Their Worldly Goods
- The Aftermath
- Break, Break, Break
- The Cocoon and the Butterfly
- His Faith in Humanity
- Billy's Rival
- Jail Birds
- In the Open
- Sweet and Low
- Sir Galahad of Twilight
- Redbird Wins
- Old Enough to Be Her Grandpa
- In the Candlelight
- The Strength o' Ten
- The Sower Reaps

=== 1915 ===
- The Unseen Vengeance
- A Golden Rainbow
- The Black Ghost Bandit
- The Legend Beautiful
- Refining Fires
- Coals of Fire
- The Law of the Wilds
- A Heart of Gold
- The Wily Chaperon
- In the Twilight
- She Never Knew
- Heart of Flame
- The Echo
- The Two Sentences
- Competition
- In the Heart of the Woods .... Ben Morgan
- In the Sunlight
- A Touch of Love
- She Walketh Alone
- The Poet of the Peaks
- When Empty Hearts Are Filled
- The Altar of Ambition
- At the Edge of Things
- The Right to Happiness
- A Woman Scorned
- The Honor of the District Attorney
- After the Storm
- The Great Question
- Pardoned
- The End of the Road
- The Buzzard's Shadow

=== 1916 ===
- The Other Side of the Door
- The Secret Wire
- The Gamble
- The Man in the Sombrero
- The Broken Cross
- The White Rosette ... Baron Edward/Pierpont Carewe
- Lillo of the Sulu Seas
- True Nobility .... Lord Devlin
- April .... Tim Fagan
- The Release of Dan Forbes
- The Abandonment .... Benson Heath
- The Fate of the Dolphin
- Dust .... John D. Moore
- Youth's Endearing Charm .... John Disbrow
- Dulcie's Adventure .... Jonas
- The Undertow .... John Morden
- The Love Hermit .... James Bolton
- Lone Star .... John Mattes

=== 1917 ===
- Beloved Rogues .... Andrews
- My Fighting Gentleman .... Judge Pembroke
- Whose Wife? .... Claude Varden
- Captain Kiddo .... Mr. Cross
- Princess Virtue .... Count Oudoff

=== 1918 ===
- A Man's Man .... Ricardo Ruey
- Broadway Love .... Jack Chalvey
- The Kaiser, the Beast of Berlin .... Capt. von Hancke
- The Lion's Claws .... Capt. Bogart
- Midnight Madness (as Harry Van Meter) .... Aaron Molitor
- The Dream Lady .... James Mattison
- His Birthright .... Adm. von Krug
- The Lure of Luxury .... Philip Leswing
- The Man of Bronze .... Trovio Valdez
- The Cabaret Girl (as Harry Van Meter) .... Balvini

=== 1919 ===
- Diane of the Green Van .... Baron Tregar
- The Day She Paid (as Harry Van Meter) .... Leon Kessler
- A Gun Fightin' Gentleman (as Harry Meter) .... Earl of Jollywell
- A Man's Fight .... Jarvis
- The Challenge of Chance (as Harry Van Meter) .... El Capitan
- A Rogue's Romance (as Harry Van Meter) .... Leon Voliere
- The Girl with No Regrets .... Geralld Marbury

=== 1920s ===
- The Lone Hand (1920) (as Harry Von Meter) .... Joe Rollins
- Dollar for Dollar (1920) (as Harry Van Meter) .... Victor Mordant
- The Cheater (1920) (as Harry Van Meter) .... Bill Tozeer
- Alias Miss Dodd (1920) (as Harry Van Meter) .... Jerry Dodd
- Under Crimson Skies (1920) (as Harry van Meter) .... Vance Clayton
- The Unfortunate Sex (1920) (as Harry Van Meter) .... James Harrington
- Dangerous Love (1920) .... Gerald Lorimer
- Reputation (1921) (as Harry Van Meter) .... Monty Edwards
- The Beautiful Gambler (1921) (as Harry Van Meter) .... Lee Kirk
- The Heart of the North (1921) .... De Brac
- Judge Her Not (1921) .... Rob Ferris
- A Guilty Conscience (1921) (as Harry Van Meteer) .... Vincent Chalmers
- Life's Greatest Question (1921) (as Harry Van Meter) .... Julio Cumberland
- When Romance Rides (1922) .... Bill Cordts
- Putting It Over (1922) (as Harry Van Meter) .... Mark Durkham
- Wildcat Jordan (1922) (as Harry Van Meter) .... Roger Gale
- My Dad (1922) .... The Factor
- The Broadway Madonna (1922) (as Harry Van Meter) .... Dr. Kramer
- Speed King (1923) .... Randolph D'Henri
- Nobody's Bride (1923) .... Morgan
- A Man's Man (1923) .... Ricardo Ruey (*see 1918 film with this title)
- The Hunchback of Notre Dame (1923) (as Harry Van Meter) .... Mons. Neufchatel
- The Breathless Moment (1924) (as Harry Van Meter) .... Tricks Kennedy
- Sagebrush Gospel (1924) .... Linyard Lawton
- Great Diamond Mystery (1924) .... Murdock
- The Cloud Rider (1925) .... Juan Lascelles
- The Texas Bearcat (1925) .... John Crawford
- Triple Action (1925) .... Eric Prang
- The Flying Mail (1926) (as Harry Van Meter) .... Bart Sheldon
- Kid Boots (1926) (as Harry Van Meter) .... Eleanor's lawyer
- Hour of Reckoning (1927)
- Border Romance (1929) .... Captain of Rurales
