= Chick Morrison =

American actor (1878–1924)

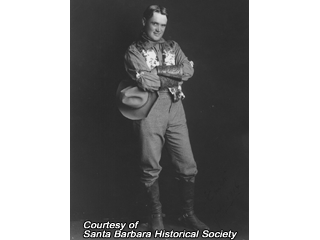
- Early 1910s
- Born: 3 April 1878; Morrison, Colorado
- Died: 20 June 1924 (aged 46); Los Angeles, California
- Other name: Charles Pacific Morrison
- Occupation: Actor
- Years active: 1909 - 1922

Charles Pacific Morrison (1878–1924), an American silent film actor, was born April 3, 1878, in Morrison, Colorado. The grandson of pioneer town founder George Morrison, he was known as "Chick" to many who knew him, a nickname conjunction of his first and middle names. A keen horse rider, he often appeared in riding contests and rodeos throughout the American west. At Morrison he trained horses for trick and fancy riding as well as break in wild horses. In 1909 Essanay Studios brought one such horse to Morrison to film some of their famous Broncho Billy series of 2-reel thrillers. Morrison got the director's attention through his expert horsemanship, daring maneuvers, as well as his control over the animals, and was used as a double for the lead actor in some of the more dangerous scenes.

Morrison left Colorado that year for California. From that point onward he appeared in feature films, rapidly growing to prominence in the film making industry. Soon he played leads, and his success and experience as an animal trainer, especially with horses, put him in great demand for some of the largest pictures made in his era. Morrison appeared in about 45 films, including ones with Charlotte Burton in films such as Rose of San Juan, Quicksands and Calamity Anne, Heroine. During his career he worked for Hal Roach Studios, the Broncho Billy Anderson and Selig Polyscope Company, and Universal Studios. He is noted as being one of the trainers for Rex the Wonder Horse.

Chick's career met a tragic end on June 20, 1924. That day while filming at Hal Roach in Los Angeles, California, Morrison's favorite horse, Young Steamboat, fell backward upon him, killing him instantly at the age of 46. The horse had accompanied Morrison to Hollywood, a horse Chick had often told friends was especially wild and difficult to tame and train.

Chick Morrison was the older brother of another early western film actor, Pete Morrison.

== Selected filmography ==
- White Eagle (1922)
- Black Beauty (1921)
- The Duke of Chimney Butte (1921)
- A Gamblin' Fool (1920)
- The Big Catch (1920)
- The Caveman (1915)
- The Certainty of Man (1914)
- A Blowout at Santa Banana (1914)
- American Born (1913)
- Calamity Anne's Dream (1913)
- The Tale of the Ticker (1913)
- In the Mountains of Virginia (1913)
- Calamity Anne, Heroine (1913)
- Rose of San Juan (1913)
