= Jacques Jaccard =

American film director

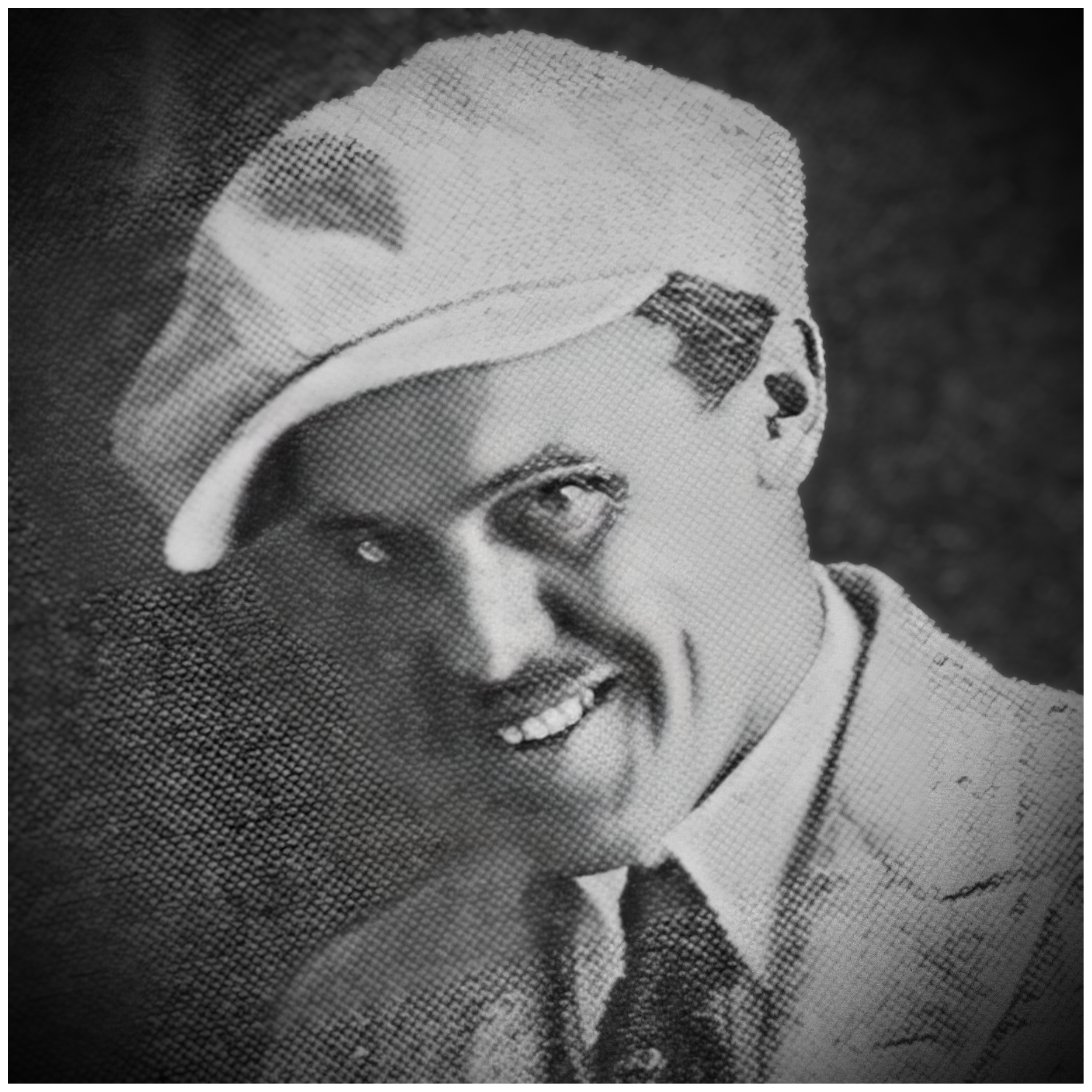
- Jaccard in 1916
- Born: Jacques Arthur Jaccard; September 11, 1886; New York City
- Died: July 24, 1960 (aged 73); Los Angeles, California
- Occupations: Film director; Screenwriter
- Years active: 1913–1938
- Spouses: Helen Leslie (div.); Catherine Dirking (div.)

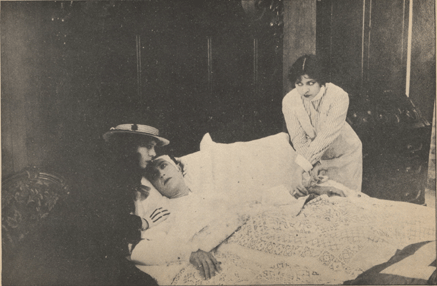
Jaccard directed The Diamond from the Sky in 1915.

Jacques Jaccard (September 11, 1886 – July 24, 1960) was an American film director, writer and actor whose achievements in cinema were mostly in silent film. He directed 86 films and wrote scripts for 80. The best-known of his films as a director was The Diamond from the Sky (1915).

== Biography ==
Jaccard told reporters he was born in New York City and educated in France. He moved back to the U.S. around 1913 and began a career as an actor and assistant director, specializing in western and action films at Universal early on. In the mid-1920s, after returning from serving in World War I, he began working for lower-rent studios such as Goodwill Pictures, Syndicate Pictures, and Arrow Pictures.

When movies with sound became popular, Jaccard's career went downhill. He directed his last film, Señor Jim, in 1936. After that, he worked as a screenwriter and dialogue director. In 1940, he rejoined Universal's serial department as a dialogue coach, working on serials such as Gang Busters and Adventures of the Flying Cadets. Jaccard retired in 1944 and died in Los Angeles in 1960.

Jaccard married Helen Leslie, an actress. He was also briefly married to Catherine Dirking (who went by the stage name Joan Jaccard during their marriage). The pair divorced in 1933.

== Selected filmography ==
- Desert Guns (1936)
- Rio Grande Ranger (1936)
- Senor Jim (1936)
- The Hawk (1931)
- One Splendid Hour (1929)
- Montmartre Rose (1929)
- The Iron Rider (1927)
- The Fire Fighters (1927)
- The Fugitive (1925)
- Vic Dyson Pays (1925)
- Unseen Hands (1924)
- Riders of the Plains (1924)
- The Miracle Baby (1923)
- The Great Alone (1922)
- The Wild Wild West (1921)
- Crossed Clues (1921)
- Who Was the Man? (1921)
- The Vanishing Dagger (1920)
- 'If Only' Jim (1920)
- The Lion's Claws (1918)
- The Red Ace (1917)
- Liberty (1916)
- The Wedding Guest (1916)
- The Adventures of Peg o' the Ring (1916)
- The Passing of Hell's Crown (1916)
- The Night Riders (1916)
- Stampede in the Night (1916)
- A Knight of the Range (1916)
- The Diamond from the Sky (1915)
- A Blowout at Santa Banana (1914)
- Destinies Fulfilled (1914)
- The Call of the Traumerei (1914)
- Rose of San Juan (1913)
- Personal Magnetism (1913)
- American Born (1913)
- In the Mountains of Virginia (1913)
- Trapped in a Forest Fire (1913)
