= Perry Banks =

Canadian actor (1877–1934)

- Born: 24 April 1877; Victoria, British Columbia, Canada
- Died: 10 October 1934 (aged 57); Santa Barbara, California, U.S.
- Occupation: Actor
- Years active: 1914–1920

Perry Banks (24 April 1877 – 10 October 1934) was a Canadian silent film actor.

He starred with William Garwood in films such as Sir Galahad of Twilight.

== Selected filmography ==
- Redbird Wins (1914)
- Sir Galahad of Twilight (1914)
- Mein Lieber Katrina Catches a Convict (1914)
- The Widow's Investment (1914)
- A Blowout at Santa Banana (1914)
- The Assayer of Lone Gap (1915)
- The Little Lady Next Door (1915)
- In Trust (1915)
- The Secret of the Submarine (1915)
- The Legend Beautiful (1915)
- The Sea Master (1917)
- A Sporting Chance (1919)
- Eve in Exile (1919)
- Six Feet Four (1919)
- The House of Toys (1920)
