= Sydney Ayres =

American actor (1879–1916)

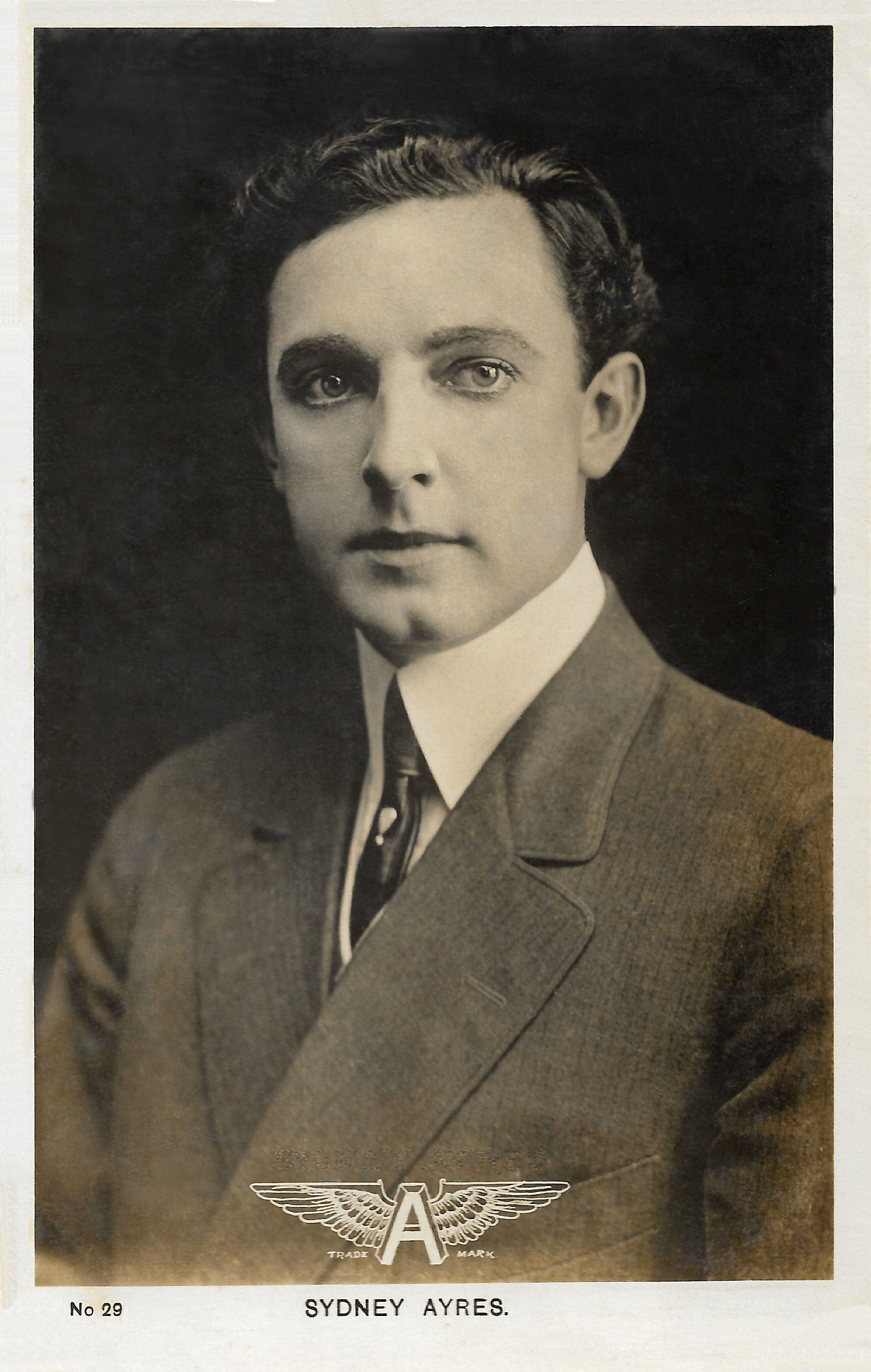
- Born: Daniel Sydney Ayres; August 28, 1879; New York City, New York
- Died: September 9, 1916 (aged 37); Oakland, California
- Other name: Sydney Ayers

Daniel Sydney Ayres (August 28, 1879 – September 9, 1916) was an American silent film actor, director and screenwriter. Ayres was also a theater actor.

== Biography ==
Born in New York City, Ayres was known for his handsome, suave looks. He often simultaneously acted and directed films after 1913. In 1916, Ayres died from multiple sclerosis at the age of 37, in Oakland.

Ayres had also a successful acting career on stage, from 1902 onwards at least.

== Selected filmography ==
=== Actor ===
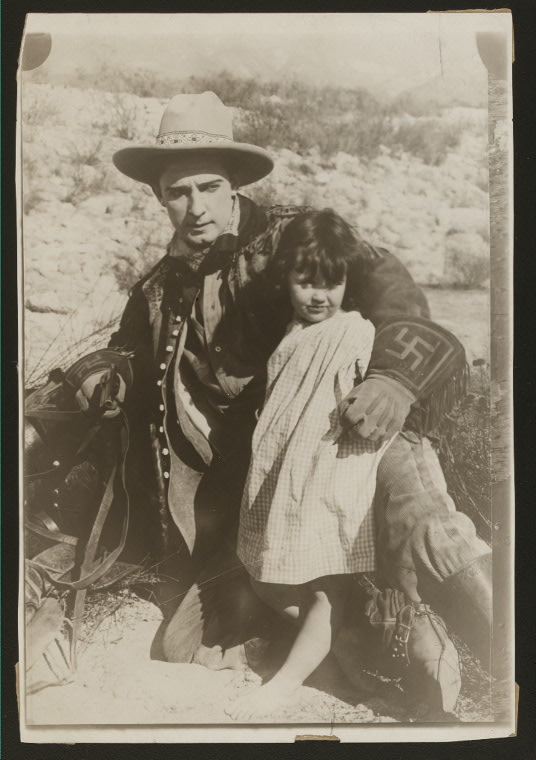
Sydney Ayres in On Desert Sands (1915)

- Blackbeard (1911)
- Trapped in a Forest Fire (1913)
- Destinies Fulfilled (1914)
- The Story of the Olive (1914)
- The Navy Aviator (1914)
- Does It End Right? (1914)
- True Western Hearts (1914)
- The Coming of the Padres (1914)
- The Call of the Traumerei (1914)
- At the Potter's Wheel (1914)

=== Director ===
- The Rose of San Juan (1913)
- Billy's Rival (1914)
- The Story of the Olive (1914)
- The Navy Aviator (1914)
- The Oath of Pierre (1914)
- Nature's Touch (1914)
- Cameo of the Yellowstone (1914)
- Feast and Famine (1914)
- The Painted Lady's Child (1914) (not to be confused with Griffith's lost The Painted Lady)
- A Man's Way (1914)
- Does It End Right? (1914)
- Their Worldly Goods (1914)
- The Cocoon and the Butterfly (1914)
- His Faith in Humanity (1914)
- The Taming of Sunnybrook Nell (1914)
- Jail Birds (1914)
- In the Open (1914)
- Sir Galahad of Twilight (1914)
- Redbird Wins (1914)

=== Writer ===
- Business Versus Love (1914)
- Break, Break, Break (1914)
