= Lorimer Johnston =

American actor

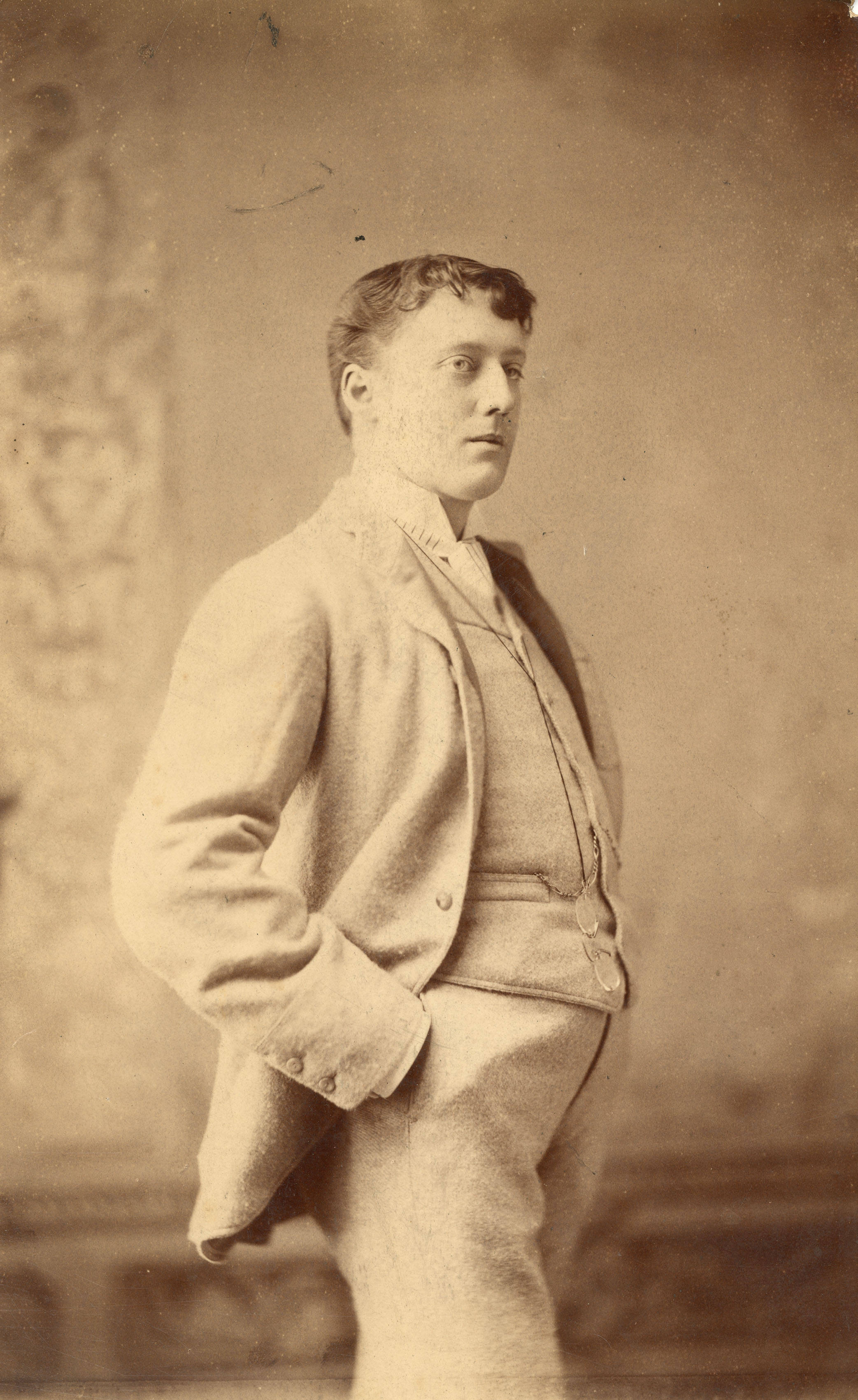
- Born: November 2, 1858; Maysville, Kentucky, United States
- Died: February 20, 1941 (aged 82); Hollywood, California, United States
- Occupations: Actor, film director

Lorimer Johnston (November 2, 1858 in Maysville, Kentucky – February 20, 1941 in Hollywood, California) was an American silent film actor and director.

He was involved in the production of over 60 films in acting and directing and he also wrote the scripts for twelve films, according to IMDb, nearly all shorts. In 1913, Johnston directed the short films For the Crown and For the Flag, working with actresses such as Charlotte Burton.

Towards the end of his career Johnston starred as an actor in sound motion pictures such as the popular Frankenstein films Ghost of Frankenstein and Son of Frankenstein.

== Partial filmography ==
=== As director and writer ===
- For the Flag (1913 short)
- For the Crown (1913 short)
- At the Potter's Wheel (1914 short)
- The Coming of the Padres (1914 short)

=== As director ===
- The Flirt and the Bandit (1913)
- At Midnight (1913)
- The Cricket on the Hearth (1923 film)

=== As actor ===
- The Strangers' Banquet (1922)
- Ruth of the Range (1923 serial)
- The Shadow of the Desert (1924)
- A Fool's Awakening (1924)
- Dante's Inferno (1924)
- Never Too Late (1925)
- The Bells (1926)
- Tarzan the Mighty (1928 serial)
- Midnight Rose (1928)
