= Charlotte Burton =

American actress

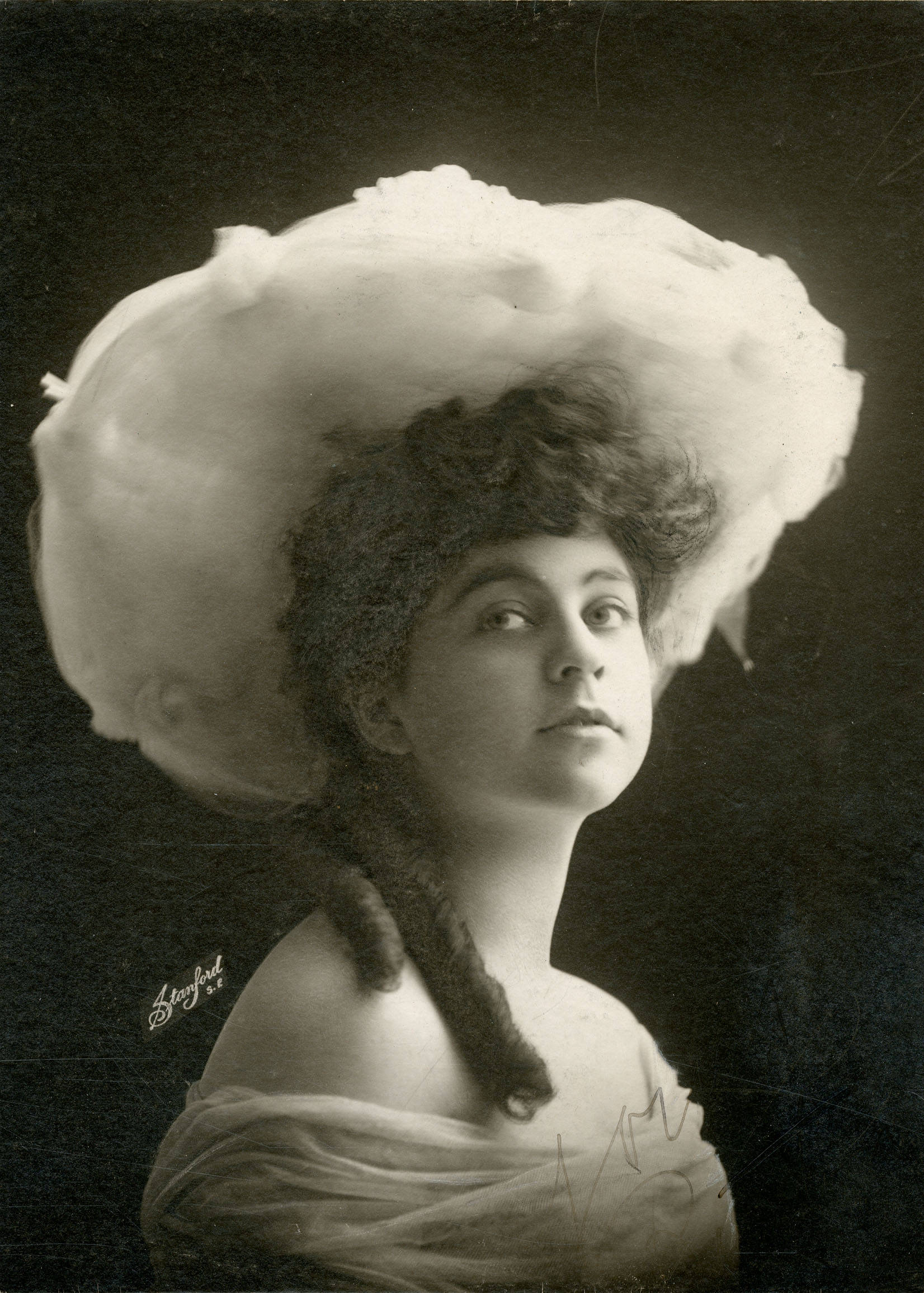
- Charlotte Burton in 1903
- Born: May 30, 1881; San Francisco, California, U.S.
- Died: March 28, 1942 (aged 60); Los Angeles, California, U.S.
- Other names: Charlotte B. Stuart, Charlotte Burton Stuart
- Occupation: Actress
- Spouses: Weston Birch Wooldridge (m. 1904, divorced) William Russell (m. 1917; div. 1921) Darrell Stuart (m. 1928)
- Children: 1

Charlotte E. Burton (May 30, 1881 – March 28, 1942) was an American silent film actress.

== Biography ==
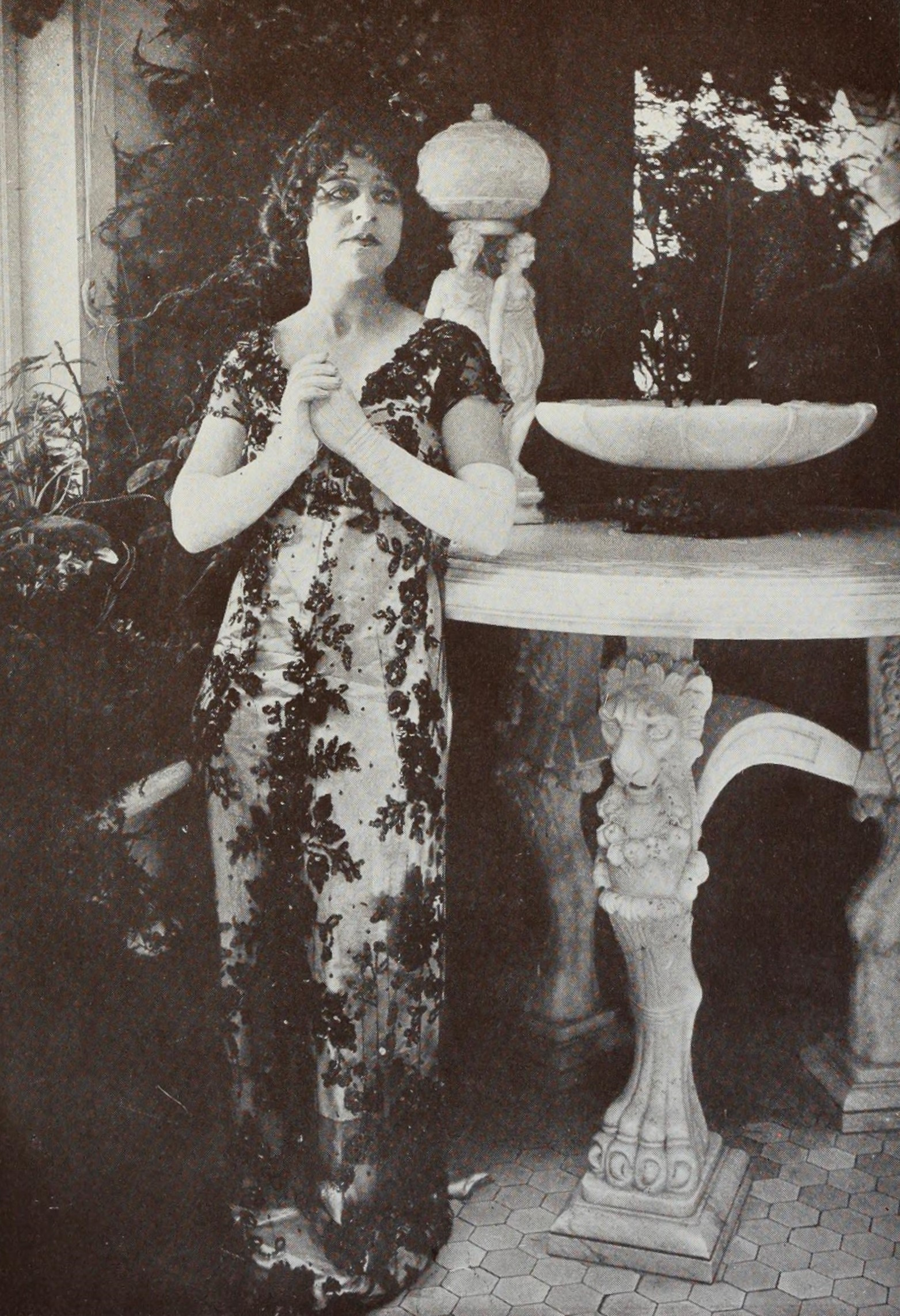
Burton in 1915

=== Early life and education ===
Charlotte E. Burton was born on May 30, 1881, in San Francisco, California. However there is some debate on her date of birth; some sources state she was born ten years later, on May 30, 1891; and other sources state she died at age 48 (which would be a date of birth around 1894).

Burton attended The Cooper–Gerson School of Acting in San Francisco, where she studied under Leo Cooper. In December 1902, Burton participated in a theatrical program in South Park, San Francisco, presented by The Cooper–Gerson School of Acting.

=== Career ===
Burton was signed by the American Film Manufacturing Company in 1912 where she worked for several years. She joined Essanay Studios which she sued in 1919 for $25,000 for breach of contract. She originally signed with the company believing she would be acting in mostly drama film but she was cast in mostly comedy films. Her salary had been $200 a week with an option for her services at the rate of $300 a week for a second year.

Charlotte claimed that she was signed by Essanay business manager, Vernon R. Day, to a contract extending from November 1916 until November 1918. She was discharged without reason. When Burton came to the Chicago, studio she refused a role offered her in a Black Cat comedy, presented to her by Essanay president George K. Spoor. She declined because she was not a comedian. Instead, she accepted a role as leading lady in a film featuring Henry B. Wallace. She admitted that she was paid for ten weeks, at $200 per week, prior to being dumped by Essanay. Essanay executives claimed Burton automatically voided her contract when she refused the comedic part.

Upon arriving in California, Burton stayed for a time at the Angleus. She came there from New York and was on her way to Santa Barbara, California, to work for the American Film Company, which had its studios there. In May 1916, Burton was involved in making The Man Who Would Not Die, directed by William F. Russell and Jack Prescott.

The company of American and Canadian players spent a week in Long Beach, California, filming water scenes. Others in the cast were Harry Keenan and Leona Hutton. The script was written by Mabel Condon. Among her many co-stars in motion pictures were Mary Miles Minter, William Russell, Harold Lockwood, and Lottie Pickford.

== Personal life ==
Burton's first marriage was to Weston Birch Wooldridge in 1904. They had a daughter together, Charlotte Burton Wooldridge (married name Coombs). After her divorce she moved to Santa Barbara and dated Victor Fleming.

In May 1917, Burton married actor William Russell in Santa Ana, California. They divorced in 1921. She remarried to contractor Darrell Stuart around 1928.

She died at the Good Samaritan Hospital in Los Angeles, California, on March 28, 1942, from a heart attack.

== Filmography ==
Year	Film	Role	Notes
1912	It Happened Thus	the older daughter	
1913	The Awakening		
1913	The Adventures of Jacques	Queen of France	
1913	The Finer Things	saddler's wife	
1913	The Rose of San Juan		
1913	The Road to Ruin		
1913	Her Big Story		
1913	The Oath of Pierre	Julia Naughton, of the border line	
1913	Through the Neighbor's Window		
1913	The Flirt and the Bandit		
1913	Trapped in a Forest Fire		
1913	The Shriner's Daughter		
1913	Calamity Anne, Heroine		
1914	Lola	May, Lola's sister	
1914	The Mirror		
1914	The Redemption of a Pal	Irene, his sister	
1914	Jail Birds	Mrs. Patterson	
1914	The Final Impulse	Ruth	
1914	A Slice of Life	Jessie, Jim's wife	
1914	Old Enough to Be Her Grandpa	Lilyan DeVoe	
1914	In the Candlelight	Nina, a model	
1914	The Archeologist	Edna Lee	
1914	The Beggar Child	Rosa, his servant	
1915	Refining Fires	Nina, the judge's daughter	
1915	Heart of Flame	Beppa	
1915	A Touch of Love	Martha	
1915	The Day of Reckoning	Rita Marr	
1915	She Walketh Alone	Rita Horton	
1915	The Diamond from the Sky	Vivian Marston	
1916	The Thoroughbred	Angela Earle	
1916	The Craving	Roby	
1916	The Bruiser	Fen Bernham	
1916	The Highest Bid	Elsie Burleigh	
1916	The Strength of Donald McKenzie	Mab el Condon	
1916	The Man Who Would Not Die	Agnes	
1916	The Torch Bearer	Janet Dare	
1916	The Love Hermit	Marie Bolton	
1916	Lone Star	Helen Mattes	
1916	The Twinkler	Rose Burke	
1918	Up Romance Road	Marta Millbanke	
1918	Hearts or Diamonds?	Adrienne Gascoyne	
1919	Man's Desire	Vera Patton	
1920	Polly of the Storm Country	Evelyn Robertson	
