= Louise Lester =

American actress (1867–1952)

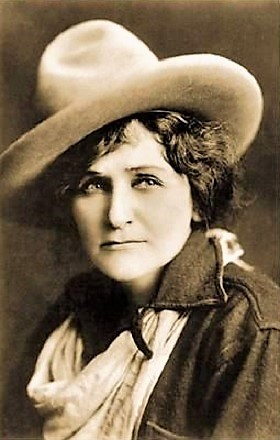
- Born: August 8, 1867; Milwaukee, Wisconsin, U.S.
- Died: November 18, 1952 (aged 85); Hollywood, California, U.S.
- Occupation: Actress
- Spouse(s): Frank Beal (?-1934) (his death) 3 children Jack Richardson (?-1914) (divorce)
- Children: 3, including Scott Beal

Louise Lester (August 8, 1867 – November 18, 1952) was an American silent film actress. She was the first female star of Western films.

== Biography ==
Lester was born in Milwaukee, Wisconsin, on August 8, 1867.

In 1884, Lester headed the Louise Lester Opera Company.

Lester made her debut in movies as a member of the Flying A Company in Santa Barbara, California after a career on stage. She starred in over 150 films before her retirement in 1935.

Lester is most famous for starring as Calamity Anne in a series of films based around the character. She also starred with William Garwood in films such as The Oath of Pierre.

Her married name was Louise Lester Beal. She was the widow of Frank Beal, a film director. She was also married to actor Jack Richardson.

On November 18, 1952, Lester died at the Motion Picture Country Home, aged 85. Her funeral was conducted in the chapel of the Utter-McKinley Strouthers Mortuary, 6240 Hollywood Boulevard. The services were conducted by the Baháʼí Faith.

== Calamity Anne ==
Lester created the Calamity Anne character and was dramatist for the series. She starred as Calamity Anne in a series of fifteen short films based around the character, playing the lead role in films such as Calamity Anne's Inheritance, Calamity Anne's Vanity, Calamity Anne's Beauty, and Calamity Anne, Heroine – all in 1913. The series continued for another four years, with the final film being Calamity Anne's Protégé, released in 1917.

== Selected filmography ==
- The Opium Smuggler (1911, Short) - Mrs. Watson
- Calamity Anne's Ward (1912, Short) - Calamity Anne
- Calamity Anne's Inheritance (1913, Short) - Calamity Anne
- Calamity Anne's Vanity (1913, Short) - Calamity Anne
- Calamity Anne, Detective (1913, Short) - Calamity Anne
- Calamity Anne's Beauty (1913, Short) - Calamity Anne
- Calamity Anne's Parcel Post (1913, Short) - Calamity Anne
- Calamity Anne Takes a Trip (1913, Short) - Calamity Anne
- Calamity Anne, Heroine (1913, Short) - Calamity Anne
- Calamity Anne's Sacrifice (1913, Short) - Calamity Anne
- Calamity Anne's Dream (1913, Short) - Calamity Anne
- Rose of San Juan (1913, Short) - Ozozco's Mother
- Calamity Anne in Society (1914, Short) - Calamity Anne
- Calamity Anne's Love Affair (1914, Short) - Calamity Anne
- The Strength o' Ten (1914, Short) - Betty's Mother
- The Poet of the Peaks (1915, Short) - Mrs. Davis
- The Day of Reckoning (1915, Short) - Mrs. Crew
- Mountain Mary (1915, Short) - Mary Doone - Ivan's Mother
- The Honor of the District Attorney (1915, Short) - Nora Mortimer - Dora's Mother
- The Newer Way (1915, Short) - Mrs. Bates
- The Exile of Bar-K Ranch (1915, Short) - Mrs. Jack Donald - Millie's Mother
- The Assayer of Lone Gap (1915, Short) - Mrs. Dugan - Belle's Mother
- Drawing the Line (1915, Short)
- In Trust (1915, Short) - Molly
- The Little Lady Next Door (1915, Short) - The Housekeeper
- The Barren Gain (1915, Short) - Mrs. Cameron - Philip's Mother
- Hearts in Shadow (1915, Short) - Mrs. Burke
- Profit from Loss (1915, Short) - Mrs. Dean
- The Silken Spider (1916, Short) - Ursula Jacques
- April (1916) - Martha Fagan
- Tangled Skeins (1916, Short) - Mrs. Wellington
- Dust (1916) - Mina's mother
- Calamity Anne, Guardian (1916, Short) - Calamity Anne
- Calamity Anne's New Job (1917, Short) - Calamity Anne
- Calamity Anne's Protégé (1917, Short) - Calamity Anne
- The Reckoning Day (1918) - Mrs. Schram
- The Mayor of Filbert (1919) - Belle Glover
- The Outcasts of Poker Flat (1919)
- The Luck of the Irish (1920) - The Landlady
- Her Reputation (1923) - Consuelo
- The Desert Hawk (1924) - Bridget
- Galloping On (1925) - Mrs. Moore - Wally's Mother
- Second Choice (1930) - Minor Role (uncredited)
- Wide Open (1930) - Office Worker (uncredited)
- Straight from the Heart (1935) - Woman (uncredited) (final film role)
