= Vivian Rich =

American actress

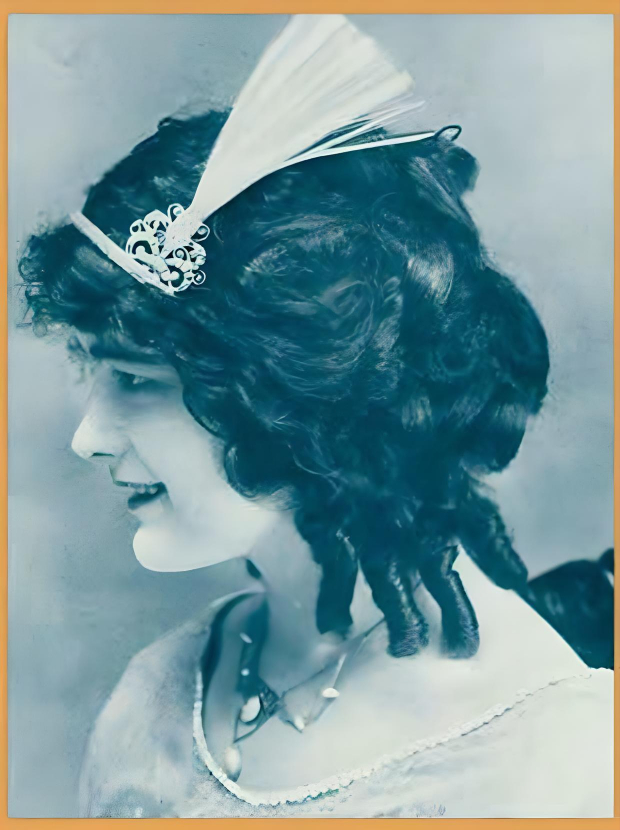
- Rich in 1916
- Born: May 26, 1893; Philadelphia, Pennsylvania, U.S.
- Died: November 17, 1957 (aged 64); Hollywood, California, U.S.
- Occupation: Actress
- Years active: 1912–1931
- Spouse: Ralph W. Jesson (m. ?–1957)

Vivian Rich (May 26, 1893 – November 17, 1957) was an American silent film actress.

== Career ==
Rich was born in Philadelphia and spent her early years there. Later the family moved to Boston and she completed her education at the Boston Latin High School. From high school she went to the stage and played in musical comedy before joining the American film company. She lived with her mother in Santa Barbara, California.

She was signed by the Nestor Film Company in 1912 and starred in almost 200 films. Rich retired from films in 1931.

== Who's Who in the Film World ==
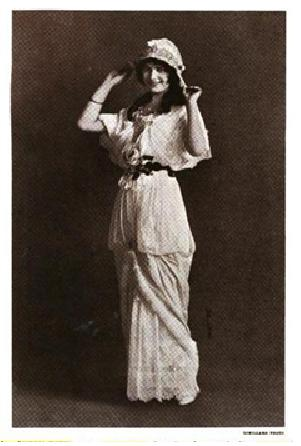
Who's Who in the Film World (1914)

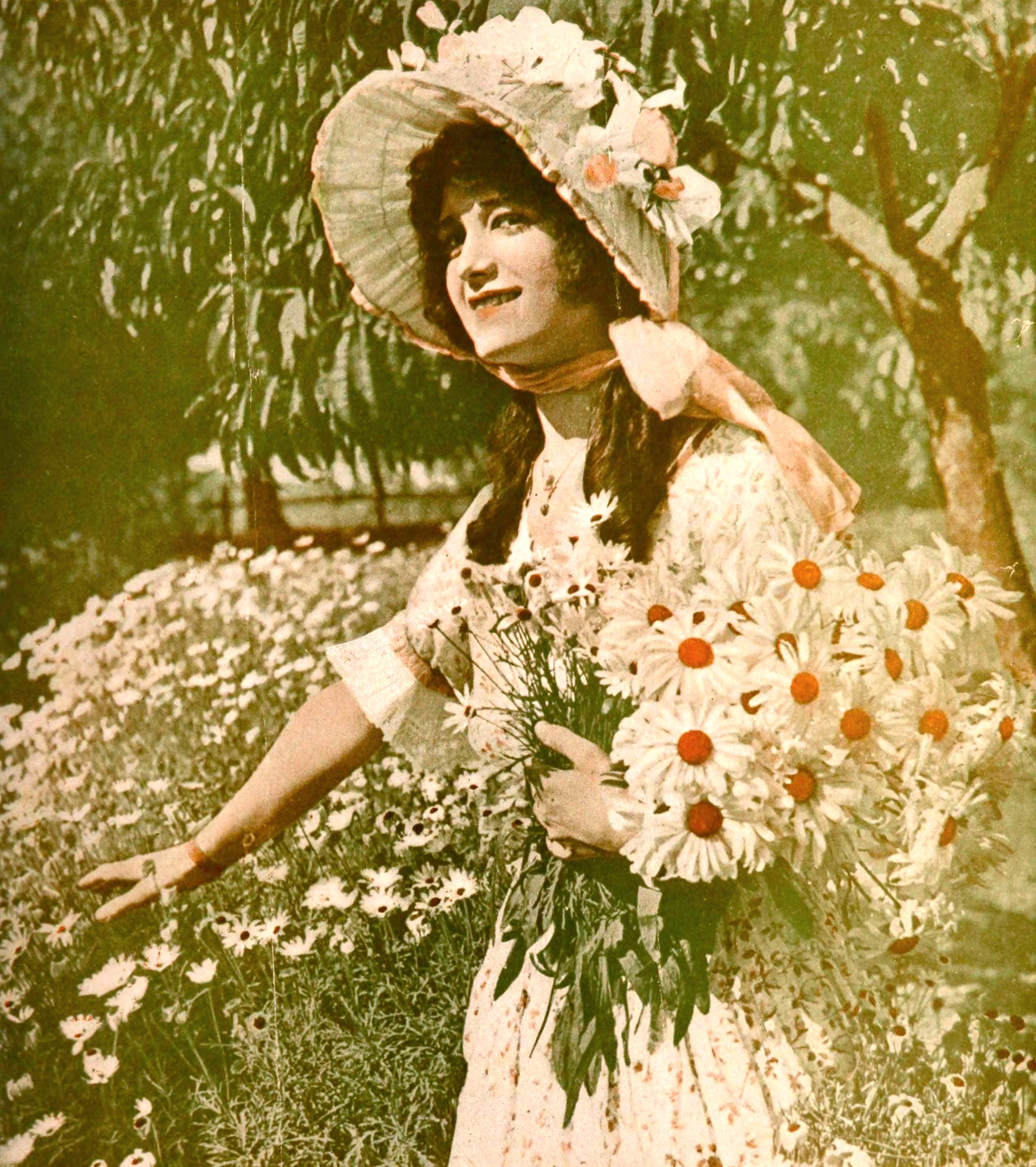
Vivian Rich with flowers (1914)

Her entry in the 1914 book Who's Who in the Film World is as follows:

"Miss Vivian Rich, the talented young leading actress of Sidney Ayres Co., American Films, who has made such a wonderful success in such short a time, was born in Philadelphia. May 26. 1894. Her first appearance in the dramatic world was in the revival of the "Country Girl," then playing in Herald Square Theatre. New York; following this engagement she joined the Lux Company and came to the Pacific Coast. She left this company and joined the Nestor. This was her first appearance before the camera. After remaining with the Nestor for some time she attached herself to the fortunes of the American Film Company, and has been with them ever since. Both on the stage and with the silent drama Miss Vivian Rich has made a wonderful success in her calling, and her vivacious spirit, winsome manner and extreme beauty make her one of the most favorite leading actresses on the screen, Some of her most recent successes have been in "The Oath of Pierre," "The Lost Sermon," "Oil On Troubled Waters," "Truth in the Wilderness," etc. Address: American Film Company, Santa Barbara, Cal."

== Death ==
On November 17, 1957, Rich was killed in a road accident in Los Angeles.

== Selected filmography ==
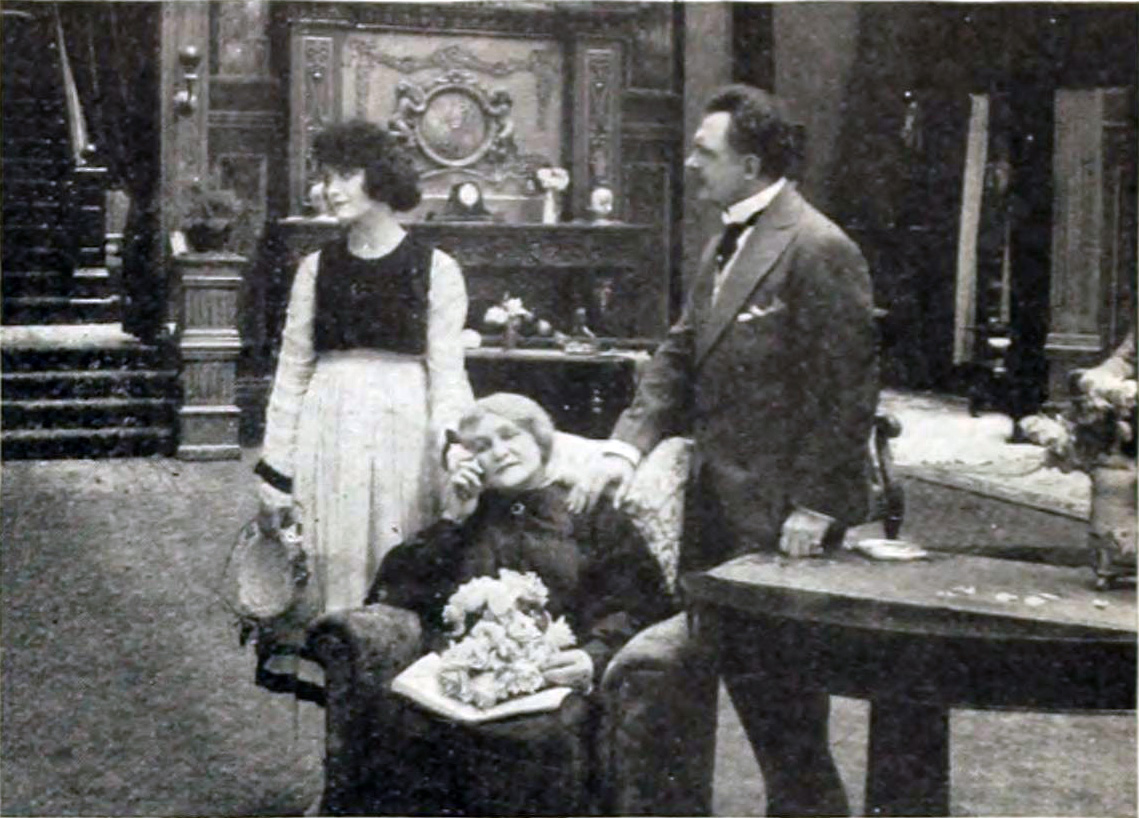
The Gentle Conspiracy (1916)

Year	Film	Role
1913	At Midnight	
1913	The Ways of Fate	
1914	Does It End Right?	
1914	Their Worldly Goods	
1914	The Taming of Sunnybrook Nell	Sunnybrook Nell, his daughter
1914	Old Enough to Be Her Grandpa	Lora
1915	Competition	Myra Stubbs - the Daughter
1915	The Day of Reckoning	Martha True
1915	The Poet of the Peaks	Lydia Lovell
1915	A Good Business Deal	
1915	Mountain Mary	Mountain Mary Turell
1915	To Melody a Soul Responds	Elsa Krieg - the Daughter
1915	The Newer Way	Betty
1915	After the Storm	Jane Roper
1915	The Exile of Bar-K Ranch	Millie Donald
1915	The Assayer of Lone Gap	
1915	Drawing the Line	Edith Latimer
1915	The Spirit of Adventure	The Mysterious Woman
1915	A Question of Honor	Nellie Fisher - Joe's Daughter
1915	In Trust	
1915	The Little Lady Next Door	
1915	Hearts in Shadow	Nan Raymond
1915	Profit from Loss	Nellie Carter
1915	The Blot on the Shield	
1915	The Smuggler's Cave	
1915	The Wasp	
1915	To Rent Furnished	Kate Proctor - an Artist
1915	The Substitute Minister	
1915	The Bluffers	Patty
1915	The Silver Lining	Nell Allen
1915	The Solution to the Mystery	Bessie Mitchell
1916	Matching Dreams	
1916	Viviana	
1916	A Sanitarium Scramble	
1916	Tangled Skeins	Laura Doone
1917	The Man from Montana	Meta Cooper
1917	A Branded Soul	Donna Sartoris
1925	Idaho	Beth Cameron
