= Jack Richardson (actor) =

American actor (1870–1960)

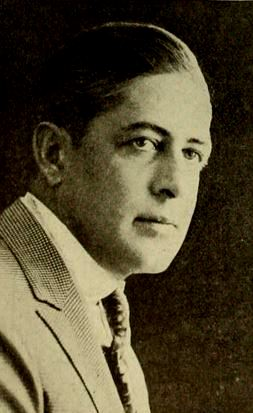
- Richardson in 1919
- Born: November 18, 1870; New York City, US
- Died: June 12, 1960 (aged 89); Santa Barbara, California, US
- Occupation: Actor
- Years active: 1911–1951

Jack Howard Richardson (November 18, 1870 – June 12, 1960) was an American actor.

== Background ==
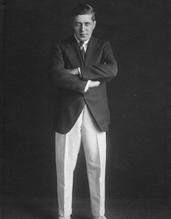
Jack Richardson

Born in New York City, he was signed to a contract in silent films in 1911 by the American Company, working there for several years. Richardson appeared in more than 560 films before his death in Santa Barbara, California.

In 1911, Richardson travelled with the American Company to film westerns under the company's Flying A banner. Richardson was among a troupe of actors who were based at La Mesa who would produce an average of two western films a week. There, Richardson was regularly as a "heavy" or in villain roles. Flying A left La Mesa in 1912, but Richardson would continue to be cast as a villain in cowboy roles, such as "Scarface Jordan", in the 1925 feature Ridin' Wild.

His credits are often confused with his contemporary John J. Richardson (AKA Jack Richardson).

== Selected filmography ==
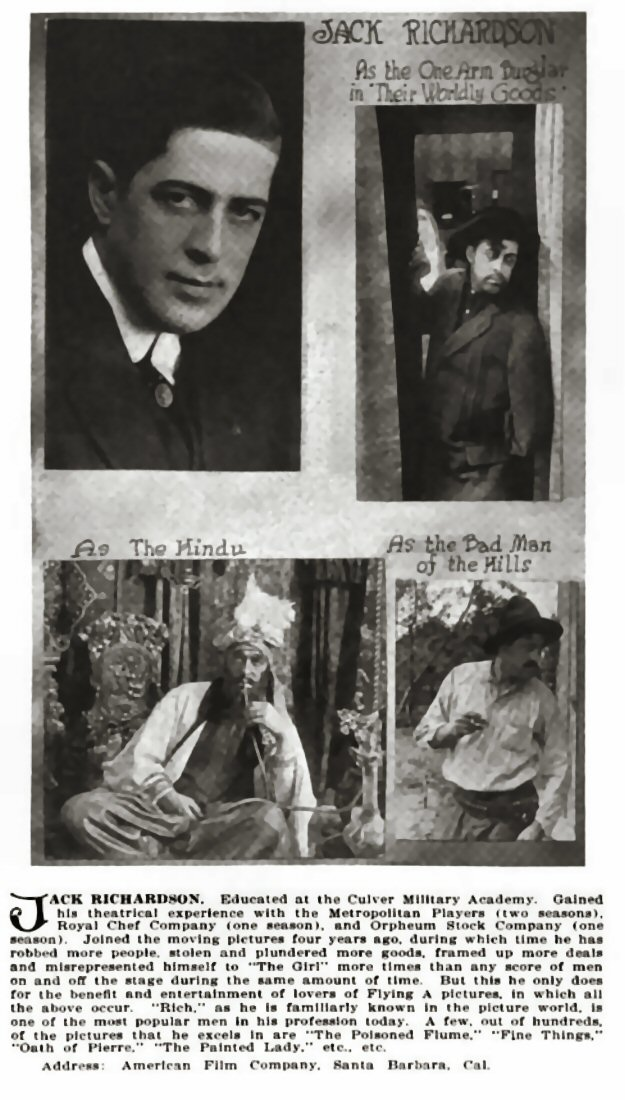
Who's Who in the Film World, 1914

Year	Title	Role	Notes
1911	The Gun Man	The Gun Man	Short
1912	The Maid and the Man	Ike Getrich	Short
1913	The Haunted House	The Smuggler	Short
1914	Sir Galahad of Twilight	Jim, his partner	Short
1915	A Heart of Gold	Jack Price	Short
1915	A Touch of Love	Steve	Short
1916	Land o' Lizards	Buck Moran	Alternative title: Silent Shelby
1916	Immediate Lee	Kentucky Hurley	
1916	That Gal of Burke's	Arnold Blake	
1917	Blood Money		
1917	The Outlaw and the Lady		
1917	Golden Rule Kate	"Slick" Barney	
1917	Mountain Dew	Milt Sears	
1917	The Sawdust Ring	Colonel Simmonds	
1917	Love or Justice	Paul Keeley	
1918	You Can't Believe Everything	Hasty Carson	
1918	Wife or Country	Dr. Meyer Stahl	
1919	Dangerous Hours	Boris Blotchi	
1919	The She Wolf	Sheriff of Mad Dog	
1919	The Mayor of Filbert	Mayor Schmidt	
1920	The Fatal Sign		
1920	Duds	Pat's Pal	
1920	The Toll Gate	The Sheriff	
1921	The Show Down	Blackie	
1922	A Dangerous Adventure	Herbert Brandon	
1923	The Daring Years	Flagier, cabaret owner	
1924	Tiger Thompson	Bull Dorgan	
1924	Dynamite Dan	Spike Moran	
1924	The Fire Patrol	"Butch" Anderson	
1925	Beyond the Border	Brick Dawson	
1925	The Texas Bearcat	Watson	
1925	Ridin' Wild	Scarface Jordan	
1926	The Winking Idol	Crawford Lange	
1926	The Night Watch	Mr. Powell	
1926	Code of the Northwest	Donald Stafford	
1926	Her Honor, the Governor	Slade	Alternative title: The Second Mrs. Fenway
1927	Black Tears		
1927	Eager Lips	Tony Tyler	
1927	The Trail of the Tiger	Ned Calvert	
1928	Across the Plains	Joe Steward	
1928	The Ballyhoo Buster	Jim Burnett	
1928	Eagle of the Night		
1929	One Splendid Hour	Peter Hoag	
1930	The Costello Case	Donnelly	
1931	Unfaithful	Armstrong	
1932	The Man from New Mexico	Jim Fletcher	
1933	Son of Kong	Sailor	Uncredited
1934	Babbitt	District Attorney's Secretary	Uncredited
1935	Gold Diggers of 1935	Floor manager	Uncredited
1936	Give Me Liberty	Man Kneeling to Trip the Commissioner	Short subject Uncredited
1937	Kid Galahad	Ringsider, fourth fight	Uncredited
1938	The Adventures of Robin Hood	Serf	
1939	The Roaring Twenties	Sleeping Train Passenger	Uncredited
1940	Gun Code	Mike McClure	
1941	Meet John Doe	Man in diner	Uncredited
1942	Obliging Young Lady	Second uncle	Uncredited
1944	The Climax	Musical Conductor	Uncredited
1945	Bells of Rosarita	Studio Director	Uncredited
1946	Suspense	Poker player	Uncredited
1947	That's My Gal	Buyer	Uncredited
1949	I Shot Jesse James	St. Joseph Saloon Bartender	Uncredited
1951	The Mating Season	Board member	Uncredited
