= Unto the Weak =

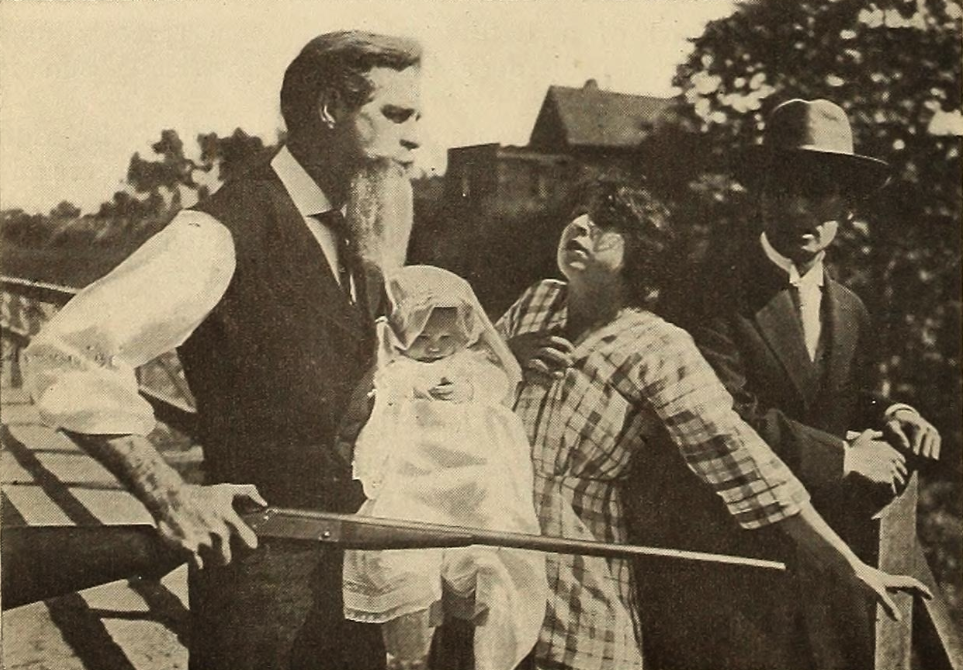
- (l-r) Ed Coxen, Charlotte Burton and George Field in "Unto the Weak" (1914)
- Starring: Charlotte Burton; William Bertram
- Distributed by: Mutual Film
- Release date: January 17, 1914
- Country: United States
- Languages: Silent film English intertitles

Unto the Weak is a 1914 American silent short drama film starring Charlotte Burton, William Bertram, Ed Coxen, George Field, and Ida Lewis.

== Plot ==
This plot summary comes from the original Library of Congress copyright filing for the film:

Alone at the edge of the village and not far from the mill race and the old bridge lived Peter – his last name is of no consequence.

With aid for the needy and a helping hand for the weak, it was not unusual when he took into his lonely home, Eleen, a young girl and her baby, when others had cast her out. The name of her lover the girl refused to tell – so Peter merely waited.

But the next door neighbor misunderstood and the news that Peter was sheltering "that girl" soon spread. Peter's pastor, the Rev. Tallett, a good, sincere man, with a son about twenty, came to see Peter and to tell him that his action was not approved of in the village. But Peter sent the Rev. Tallett about his business, for he knew that his action were far more Christ-like than those of the man who stones the weak. And he took down his old gun and cleaned it carefully for he felt that he might need it. And it so happened that he did. For the fact was disclosed to him that Eleen's lover was no other than Henry, the Rev. Tallett's only son.

Then the gun did come into service, for Peter marched the young man to his father's door and there forced the shocked father to marry his only son to Eleen.

Then of course, the village approved of Peter's actions. But Peter didn't care one way or the other. But in the bottom of his heart he knew that he had done right, in giving a word of sympathy instead of a sermon, and blotting out a share of the sorrow of this world.
