= The Town of Nazareth =

- Written by: Marc Edmund Jones
- Starring: Ed Coxen; Charlotte Burton; William Bertram
- Distributed by: Mutual Film
- Release date: March 30, 1914
- Country: United States
- Languages: Silent film English intertitles

The Town of Nazareth is a 1914 American silent short drama film starring Ed Coxen, Charlotte Burton, William Bertram, Albert Cavens, Jean Durrell, George Field and Winifred Greenwood. Written by Marc Edmund Jones, the film was released by the American Film Manufacturing Company on March 30, 1914, in two reels.

== Cast ==
- Ed Coxen as Ralph Rosney, the Poet-Philosopher
- William Bertram as Wilson, a wealthy cloth manufacturer
- Charlotte Burton as Miriam, his daughter
- Josephine Ditt as Jane Rosney, Ralph's sister
- George Field as Walter Castler, who married the girl he loves
- Winifred Greenwood as Mary
- Albert Cavens as Frank, son of Mary and Walter, age 5

== Reception ==
The Chicago Daily Tribune said of the film, "This is Emerson's mouse trap theory done into pictures." In a film review, The Moving Picture World stated: "A two-part offering that would have been better in one reel. The theme is a double love story, of a poet who lost in love, and of the son of the girl he loved who, refusing the poet, married a dyer of the Vermont village, Nazreth. The poet becomes famous; the dyer, without good reason, accounts himself a failure and runs away and dies. How the son is sent to Harvard and after attempting to make good in the city comes home and makes business come to him is the chief interest in the second reel. There are crude things in it a-plenty and good, things, too. The atmosphere of the country town makes the story interesting. The acting is fair and the photography acceptable. A fair offering; a bit above the commercial plane."
