= Mein Lieber Katrina Catches a Convict =

- Directed by: Thomas Ricketts
- Written by: J. Edward Hungerford
- Starring: Charlotte Burton; Harry De Vere; Perry Banks; Edith Borella; Ida Lewis; John Steppling
- Distributed by: Mutual Film
- Release date: July 3, 1914
- Country: United States
- Languages: Silent; English intertitles

Mein Lieber Katrina Catches a Convict is a 1914 American silent comedy short starring Charlotte Burton, Harry De Vere, Perry Banks, Edith Borella, Ida Lewis, and John Steppling. The film is the sequel to Mein Lieber Katrina.
