= Ditt =

Ditt is a surname and a given name. Notable people with the name include:

Surname:

- Josephine Ditt (1868–1939), American film actress

Given name:

- Guran Ditt Kumar, Indian revolutionary associated with the pioneers of the Gadhar movement
- Giani Ditt Singh or Ditt Singh (1850–1901), historian, scholar, poet, editor and Singh Sabha reformer

== See also ==
- Ditt Apotek, chain of 80 independent pharmacies on franchise from Norsk Medisinaldepot
- Ditt Inre, indie duo from Stockholm, Sweden, consisting of Hampus Klint and Einar Andersson
