= In the Footprints of Mozart =

- Directed by: Tom Ricketts
- Written by: Clarence J. Harris (Story)
- Starring: Ed Coxen; George Field; Winifred Greenwood; Ida Lewis
- Distributed by: Mutual Film
- Release date: May 18, 1914
- Country: United States
- Languages: Silent film English intertitles

In the Footprints of Mozart is a 1914 American silent short drama film directed by Tom Ricketts starring Ed Coxen, George Field, Winifred Greenwood, and Ida Lewis.

== Plot ==
This was the plot summary filed with the original copyright of the film at the Library of Congress:

Hopelessly, Stanton works with compositions; returned Ms., together with his sweetheart's ring, which Ruth's aristocratic mother forced her to surrender, crush out his ambitions. An aged neighbor enters, scarred with evidences of life's struggle, and speaks:

"Tell me not in mournful numbers, Life is but an empty dream"....

The Old Man's tale of being saved by Stanton's music, awakens Stanton to hope and courage and saves his life.

Alone, Stanton gazes at the silent features in the bust of Mozart and recalls the tragedy of this world's Master of 624 Operas, Masses, etc. Mozart in dying hours writes the "Requiem" by special order, praying that it bring fame and money. Mozart sings this "Requiem" to his dying breath and dies, buried in an unknown grave in the Potter's Field.

"Lives of great men all remind us We can make our lives sublime".

Stanton sees Mozart's feeble wife, laying a tiny wreath at the foot of the cross and believes that heaven's white robed choir is singing the "Gloria Chorus", beside the broken hearted wife. He gazes at the "Gloria Chorus", recalls the choir which sang it as all choirs have done, takes courage and with heart, opens his window as of old and plays his violin with all his soul. Outside the aged neighbor is waiting for these tones. A stranger, passing, stops. Is charmed, finds the originator of the marvelous music, discovers in the discarded Ms. that for which he seeks, and through him fortune smiles, and Stanton looks up:

"With a heart for any fate".

Ruth, turns from her mother, declares she will starve with Stanton rather than turn from him. She goes to him, declares her purpose. Stanton puts the half eaten loaf of bread aside, shows Ruth money and his turning tide. Stanton clasps the girl to his breast. The old man looks in, smiles his blessing as he sees Ruth take the tiny dried wreath of leaves from Mozart's picture, and lay it on the brow of her lover.

== Cast ==
- Ed Coxen as Stanton, a young musician
- Winifred Greenwood as Ruth, his sweetheart
- Ida Lewis as Ruth's mother
- George Field as Mozart, age 30
- Charlotte Burton as Mozart's wife
- William Bertram as Joseph Allen
- Edith Borella as Wife of an old friend of Stanton
- John Steppling as a businessman
- Harry De Vere as a musician
- Adelaide Bronti as a poor neighbor
