= The Castle Ranch =

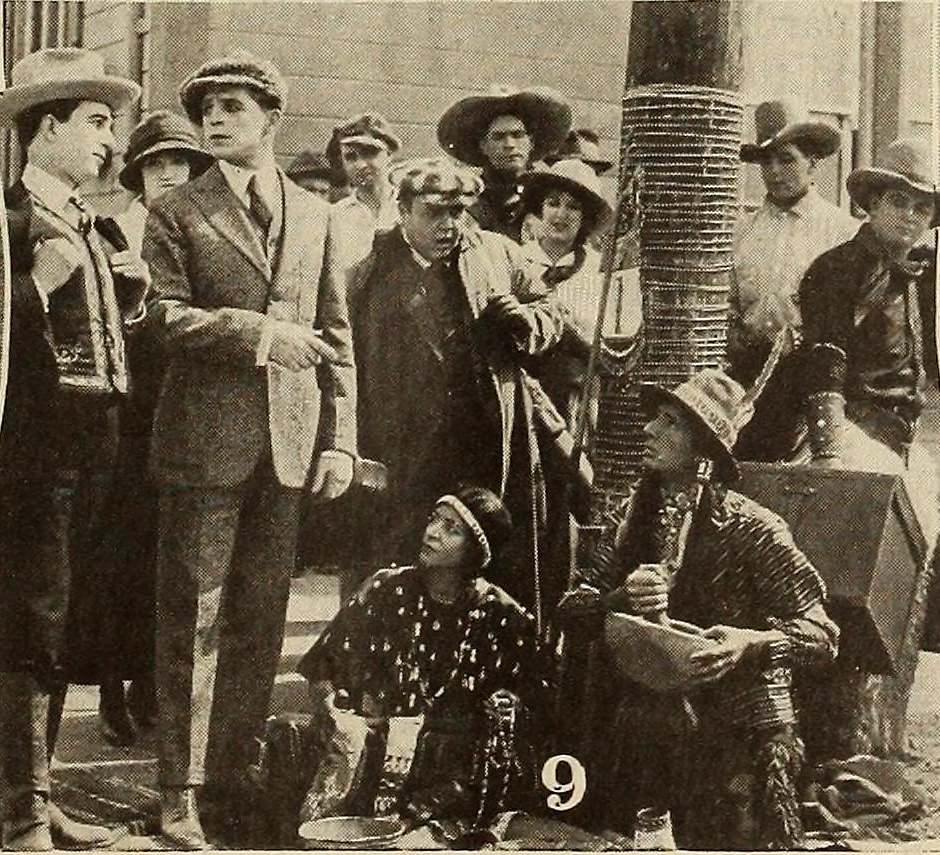
- Ed Coxen and Joseph Harris
- Directed by: Henry Otto
- Starring: Josephine Ditt; Edward Coxen; John Steppling
- Production company: American Film Company
- Distributed by: Mutual Film
- Release date: April 19, 1915
- Running time: 2 reels
- Country: USA
- Language: Silent (English intertitles)

The Castle Ranch is a 1915 American silent short comedy drama Western film directed by Henry Otto and starring Josephine Ditt and Ed Coxen. The film was produced by American Film Company and distributed by Mutual Film.

== Plot ==
According to a film magazine, "Lord Hickey buys for his second son an estate in Montana. On the photograph submitted by Jefferson Todd, a land shark, "Castle Ranch" is represented to be a magnificent pile rising in the midst of mountain grandeur. However, when Algy arrives with Simpson, his valet, to take possession, he finds that his mansion is only a one room shack with a high board front, turreted and painted to imitate a castle. He is secretly amused to think that his father has been swindled. Though Simpson is in a perpetual state of terror at the thought of being in a country where savage Indians abound, Algy determines to make the best of a bad bargain for a while at least.

The morning after his arrival, the young Englishman breakfasts at the Dunn ranch, where he meets Sally, his neighbor's attractive daughter. News is brought of the discovery of oil nearby. Todd, later in the day, examines by stealth the well on Algy's land and finds the water coated with a blackish substance. He offers to buy back the ranch and Algy accepts. The deal has been legally transferred when Sally appears upon the scene. She begs Algy not to sell. "Didn't you know," she says, "that it was oil which Jeff Todd found in the well?" "I fawncy I did," replied the astute Englishman. "I put it there myself, don't you know." Todd realizes that he has been beaten at his own game. More, that he hasn't a ghost of a chance with Sally."

== Cast ==
- G.E. Rainey as Lord Hickey
- Josephine Ditt as Lady Hickey
- Ed Coxen as Algy, their second son
- John Steppling as Simpson, his valet
- Harry Edmundson as Wells Dunn
- Winifred Greenwood as Sally, his daughter
- Joseph Harris as Jeff Todd
- Frank Nicely as Sprout
- William Bertram as Big Chief Bill

== Reception ==
Motography reviewer Clarence J. Caine was very positive towards the film, praising the performances of the cast, who he described as "can always be depended upon to do good work." Additional praise was saved for the production, saying the film had "the artistic beauty typical of American pictures" and "the photography is also fully up to the high standard set by productions of this company."
