= In the Firelight =

1913 film by Tom Ricketts

- Directed by: Thomas Ricketts
- Written by: Marc Edmund Jones (poem)
- Starring: Charlotte Burton; William Bertram
- Distributed by: Mutual Film
- Release date: December 29, 1913
- Country: United States
- Languages: Silent film English intertitles

In the Firelight is a 1913 American silent short silent film directed by Thomas Ricketts and based the a poem "In the Firelight" by Marc Edmund Jones. The film stars Charlotte Burton, William Bertram, Ed Coxen, and George Field. Most of the supporting cast were one-off actors including Mabel Marmer and William Brumburg, Dolly Lester, and Abbott Lindsey.
