= Firelight (disambiguation) =

Firelight is a 1997 romance film.

Firelight may also refer to:

- Firelight (band), a Maltese pop/folk band
- Firelight (1964 film), an American science fiction adventure film
- Firelight (2012 film), a made-for-television drama film
- Firelight (song), a song by Dutch band Within Temptation
- Firelight, a short story written by Ursula K. Le Guin

== See also ==
- In the Firelight, a 1913 American silent short film
- Firelight Media, a non-profit filmmaking company
