= The Shriner's Daughter =

1913 American film by Tom Ricketts

- Directed by: Thomas Ricketts
- Starring: Charlotte Burton; Violet Knights; Helen Armstrong; William Bertram; Edith Borella
- Distributed by: Mutual Film
- Release date: December 22, 1913
- Country: United States
- Languages: Silent; English intertitles

The Shriner's Daughter is a 1913 American silent short film starring Charlotte Burton, Violet Neitz, Helen Armstrong, William Bertram, Edith Borella, Ed Coxen, Reaves Eason, George Field, Winifred Greenwood, Ida Lewis, Nina Richdale and William Tedmarsh.
