= The Flirt and the Bandit =

1913 film

- Directed by: Lorimer Johnston
- Starring: R.D. Armstrong; Charlotte Burton; Ed Coxen; George Field
- Distributed by: Mutual Film
- Release date: September 29, 1913
- Country: United States
- Languages: Silent film English intertitles

The Flirt and the Bandit is a 1913 American silent short drama film directed by Lorimer Johnston starring R.D. Armstrong, Charlotte Burton, Ed Coxen, George Field, James Harrison and Chester Withey.
