= Through the Neighbor's Window =

- Directed by: Edward Coxen
- Starring: Charlotte Burton; Edith Borella; Jean Durrell; Robert Grey; Billie West
- Distributed by: Mutual Film
- Release date: September 11, 1913
- Country: United States
- Languages: Silent; English intertitles

Through the Neighbor's Window is a 1913 American silent short comedy film directed by Edward Coxen starring Charlotte Burton, Edith Borella, Jean Durrell, Robert Grey and Billie West.
