= The Butterfly (1914 film) =

- Directed by: Tom Ricketts
- Starring: Charlotte Burton; George Field
- Distributed by: Mutual Film Corporation
- Release date: August 12, 1914
- Country: United States
- Languages: Silent film English intertitles

The Butterfly is a 1914 American silent short film directed by Tom Ricketts, a drama starring Charlotte Burton, George Field, Edward Coxen, Edith Borella, Jean Durrell, Ida Lewis and John Steppling. A fashion columnist mentioned the film because of the "very artistic creations" worn by Burton and Winifred Greenwood on screen, as well as its "splendid photography and acting".
