= The Lure of the Sawdust =

- Directed by: Tom Ricketts
- Starring: Charlotte Burton; George Field
- Distributed by: Mutual Film
- Release date: July 13, 1914
- Country: United States
- Languages: Silent; English intertitles

The Lure of the Sawdust is a 1914 American silent drama short directed by Tom Ricketts starring Charlotte Burton, George Field, Ed Coxen, Edith Borella, Ida Lewis and John Steppling.
