= In the Twilight =

1915 film

- Directed by: Tom Ricketts
- Written by: Marc Edmund Jones
- Starring: Perry Banks; Charlotte Burton; Reaves Eason
- Distributed by: Mutual Film
- Release date: February 15, 1915
- Country: United States
- Languages: Silent film English intertitles

In the Twilight is a 1915 American silent short drama film directed by Tom Ricketts. The film stars Perry Banks, Charlotte Burton, Reaves Eason, David Lythgoe, Louise Lester, Vivian Rich, and Harry Van Meter.

It is a two-reel film that was released on February 15, 1915. Based on the song "Love's Old Sweet Song", the movie is interspersed with lyrics from the piece.

== Cast ==
- Harry von Meter as Samuel Drew (as Harry Van Meter)
- Vivian Rich as Mary Harris
- Jack Richardson as George Drew
- Charlotte Burton as Ellen Harris
- Perry Banks as John Drew - the Father
- Louise Lester as Mrs. Harris
- Mrs. Tom Ricketts as Doris Grant (as Josephine Ditt)
- Robert Klein as Old Grant
- B. Reeves Eason as Clarence Handyslides (as Reaves Eason)
- Jean Durrell

== Reception ==
In a positive review, Motography called the film "one of the most wholesome heart-interest stories ever released by the American Film Manufacturing Company". It continued, "Photographically the feature is a gem, some of the scenes on a peaceful farm being real works of art, and comparable to nothing less than paintings. Harry Von Meter, Jack Richardson, Vivian Rich and Charlotte Burton have the four leading roles, and all of them are seen to advantage, though possibly Mr. Richardson is a bit the more entitled to praise for his clever characterizations."

In another positive review, The Moving Picture World praised the film for being "very successful in its way and lead[ing] up to a home-coming scene of real pathos" and said, "This is obviously sentimental in treatment, but gets over very well. The photography is pleasing and the cast good." Reel Life said the film was "a touching drama of love, disappointment and tardy fulfillment".

The same periodical wrote "Twilight, fifth of the light series written by Marc Jones, has been released in the Mutual program by the American company for which it was produced by Thomas Ricketts. Twilight is more ambitious than its predecessors, Daylight, Firelight, Moonlight and Candlelight".
