= The Power of Light (film) =

- Directed by: Lorimer Johnston
- Written by: Clarence J. Harris
- Starring: Charlotte Burton; Sydney Ayres; Jacques Jaccard
- Distributed by: Mutual Film
- Release date: January 5, 1914
- Country: United States
- Languages: Silent film English intertitles

The Power of Light is a 1914 American silent short drama film directed by Lorimer Johnston. The film features Charlotte Burton, Sydney Ayres, Jacques Jaccard, Violet Neitz, Mrs. Ed Coxen, Caroline Cooke, Louise Lester, Jack Richardson, Ed Coxen, Vivian Rich, and Harry Van Meter.
