= Jean Durrell =

American actress

- Occupation: Film actress

Jean Durrell was an American silent film actress. She starred in shorter films in the early silent era between 1913 and 1915. She starred with Charlotte Burton in short films such as While There's Life and Through the Neighbor's Window.

In 1913, she was a newcomer in the film business. She starred in films with a number of popular actors and actresses of the day, including Wallace Reid.

== Filmography ==
- Saints and Sinners (1915)
- In the Twilight (1915)
- Refining Fires (1915)
- The Alarm of Angelon (1915)
- The Tin Can Shack (1915)
- Daylight (1914)
- The Butterfly (1914)
- The Widow (1914)
- At the End of a Perfect Day (1914)
- Sheltering an Ingrate (1914)
- The Town of Nazareth (1914)
- The Lost Treasure (1914)
- The Hermit (1914)
- The Trail of the Lost Chord (1913)
- Martha's Decision (1913)
- Follies of a Day and a Night (1913)
- The Step Brothers (1913)
- Crooks and Credulous (1913)
- The Ghost of the Hacienda (1913)
- Through the Neighbor's Window (1913)
- While There's Life (1913)
- The Sinews of War (1913)
- On the Border (1913)
