= The Unseen Vengeance =

- Directed by: Thomas Ricketts
- Written by: Adele Harris (Story)
- Starring: Harry von Meter; Vivian Rich
- Distributed by: Mutual Film
- Release date: December 30, 1914
- Country: United States
- Languages: Silent film English intertitles

The Unseen Vengeance is a 1915 American silent short drama film directed by Tom Ricketts. Starring Harry von Meter, Vivian Rich, and Charlotte Burton.

== Plot ==
This was the plot summary filed with the original copyright notice at the Library of Congress:

John Holland and his wife Kate are happy until he wins fame through his book "The Unseen Vengeance". The book has been inspired by the story of a Russian Girl, the daughter of a refugee who has been assassinated by the spies of his government. She afterward becomes famous as an actress and John, also famous at this time, meets her and they become infatuated. John forgets love and duty and deserts Kate for Olga. The story deals with the unseen vengeance that pursues him in the guise of remorse – failure – sickness and finally desertion by the woman for whom he has sacrificed everything. Kate, whose love has been constant and who by her heroic efforts has gained success, goes to him in his extremity. Her love has taught her to know him better than he knew himself and they are reunited.

== Cast ==
- Harry von Meter as John Holland
- Vivian Rich as Kate, his wife
- Charlotte Burton as Olga
- Robert Klein as Her father
- Edith Borella as Hostess
- B. Reeves Eason as Host
- Jack Richardson as George Sherwood, editor
- Cupid Cavens as The boy, 5 years old
- Cora Morrison as Maid
- William Vaughn as Doctor
