= The Food Chopper War =

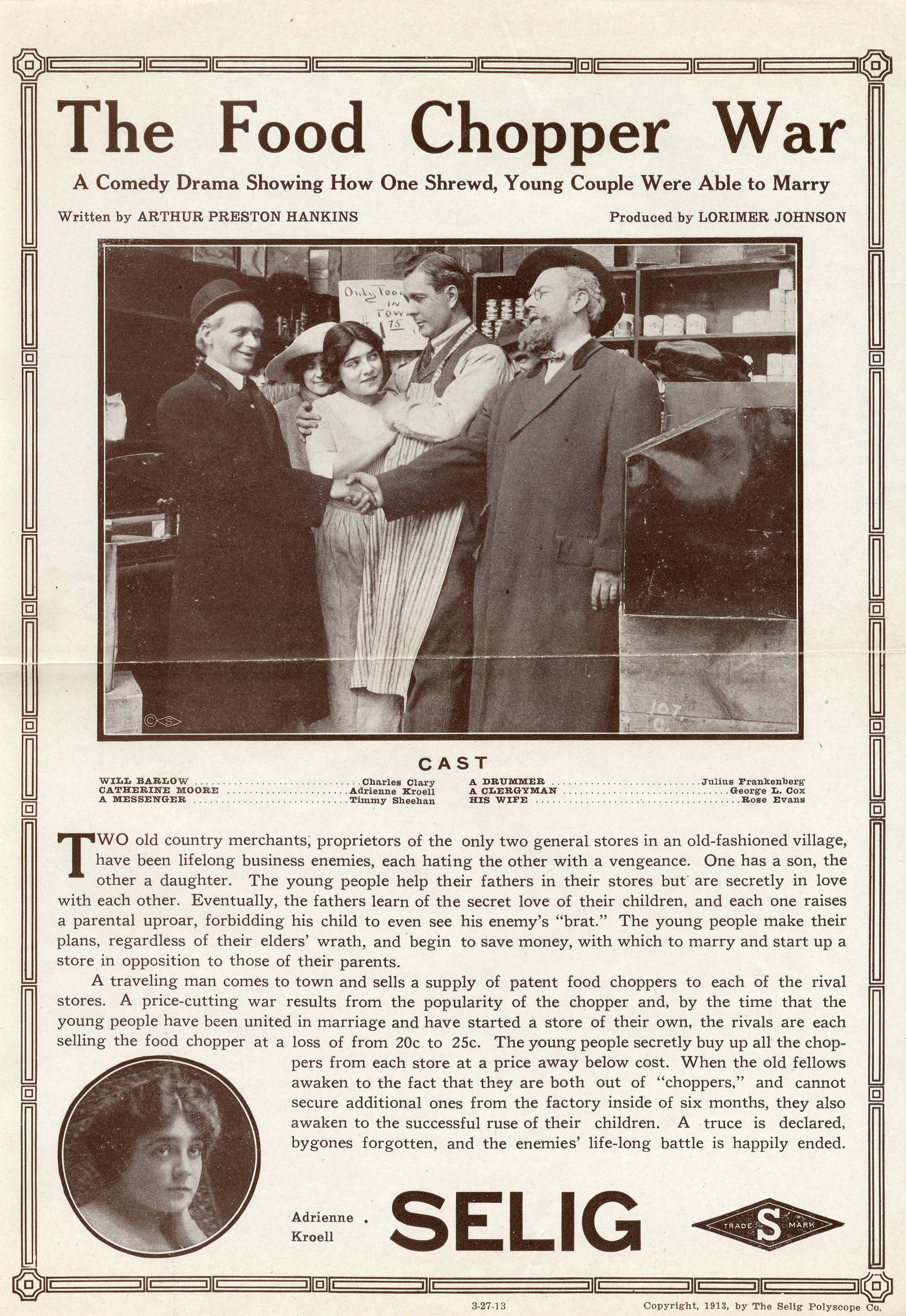
- Release flier
- Written by: Arthur Preston Hankins
- Produced by: Lorimer Johnson
- Starring: Charles Clary; Adrienne Kroell; Timmy Sheehan
- Distributed by: Selig Polyscope Company
- Release date: March 27, 1913 (U.S.)
- Running time: 1 reel
- Country: United States
- Languages: Silent; English intertitles

The Food Chopper War is a 1913 American silent film drama produced by Lorimer Johnson. The film stars Charles Clary, Adrienne Kroell, Timmy Sheehan and Julius Frankenberg. The film status is uncertain but a release flier survives which is now at the Margaret Herrick Library at the Academy of Motion Pictures Arts and Sciences, it was part of the Charles G. Clarke collection.

== Plot ==
In an old-fashioned village, two rival merchants, each owning one of the only two general stores, have been lifelong adversaries. Their enmity is so deep that each harbors a deep hatred for the other. One has a son, the other a daughter. Despite helping in their respective stores, the children secretly fall in love. When the fathers discover their children's secret romance, they each one raises an objection, forbidding their child from associating with their enemy's offspring. Undeterred, the young couple devises a plan to save money and marry, eventually opening a store in direct competition to their parents' establishments.

A travelling man comes to town and sells a supply of patent food choppers to each of the rival stores. A price-cutting war results from the popularity of the chopper and by the time that the son and daughter have been united in marriage and have started a store of their own, the rivals are each selling the food chopper at a loss from 20 to 25 cents. The young people secretly buy up all the choppers from each store at a price away below cost. When the two men become aware of the fact that they are both out of "choppers", and cannot secure additional ones from the factory inside of six months, they also realize the successful ruse of their children. A truce is declared, bygones forgotten and the enemies's lifelong battle is happily ended.

== Cast ==
- Charles Clary - Will Barlow
- Adrienne Kroell - Catherine Moore
- Timmy Sheehan - a messenger
- Julius Frankenburg - a drummer (billed as Julius Frankenberg)
- George L. Cox - a clergyman
- Rose Evans - his wife
