= The Haunted House (1913 film) =

- Directed by: Lorimer Johnston
- Written by: Maie B. Havey (story)
- Starring: Julius Frankenburg; Harry Van Meter; Vivian Rich; Jack Richardson
- Distributed by: Mutual Film
- Release date: November 8, 1913
- Running time: unknown
- Country: United States
- Languages: Silent film English intertitles

The Haunted House is a 1913 American silent short comedy-drama film starring Julius Frankenburg, Harry Van Meter, Vivian Rich, and Jack Richardson; the film is based on a story by Maie B. Havey (who also acted in silent films).

== Plot ==
Ethel is a young girl trying to choose the man she will marry. She challenges her beaus to compete for her hand. Whichever of them can spend a night in a haunted house will become her husband, but only one can win.

== Cast ==
- Vivian Rich- Ethel
- Julius Frankenburg-Bob ("timorous lover")
- Harry Van Meter- the Stranger
- Jack Richardson-the Smuggler

== Reception ==
Kendall Phillips notes that at the time the film, although today considered a comedy, was "presented as primarily uncanny".
