= Ditt Inre =

Swedish band

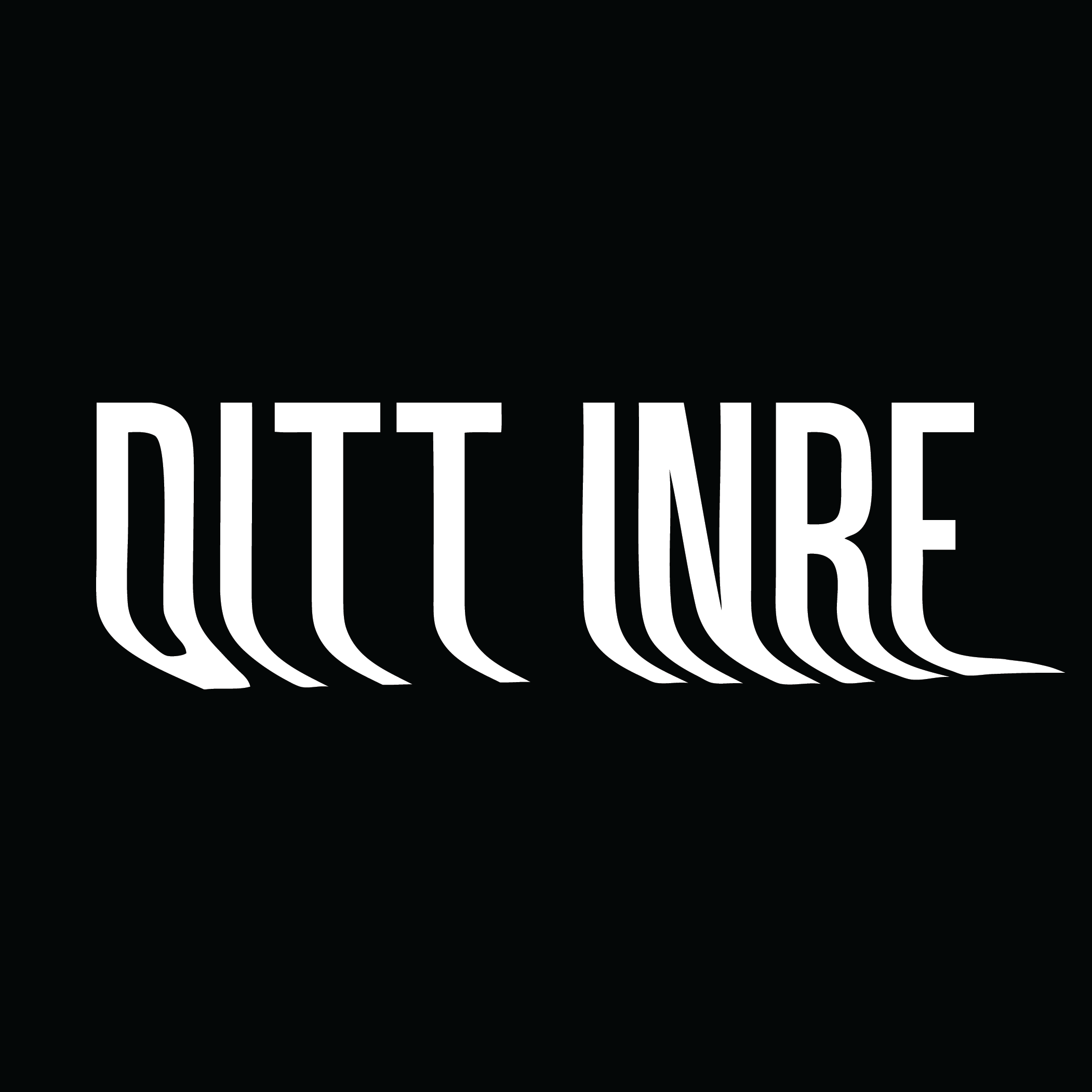

Background information
- Origin: Sweden
- Genres: Indie pop Dream pop Synthpop; Electronic
- Years active: 2011-present
- Labels: Birthday; Cascine; Tugboat Records
- Members: Einar Andersson; Hampus Klint
- Website: Official site

Ditt Inre is an indie duo from Stockholm, Sweden, consisting of Hampus Klint and Einar Andersson, currently signed to Cascine. Ditt Inre has been featured by The Guardian, Pitchfork, Vice, Stereogum, and The Line of Best Fit, amongst others. The Guardian's Paul Lester drew comparisons to A-ha, Sigur Rós, OMD and Air France.

== Discography ==
=== Albums ===
- Värd mer än guld (2013). LP on Cascine, CD on Tugboat Records.

=== EP's ===
- En värld i brand (2012). Cascine.

=== Singles ===
- Formulär 1A - The Remixes (2014). Cascine.
- Inget Val/Din Röst (2012). Cascine.

=== Compilation appearances ===
- Cascine Standouts: 2010-2012 (2012). Cascine.
