= The Swift Shadow =

1927 film

- Directed by: Jerome Storm
- Screenplay by: Ethel Hill
- Starring: Ranger the Dog; Lorraine Eason; William Bertram; Sam Nelson; Albert J. Smith; Milburn Morante
- Cinematography: Robert De Grasse
- Production company: Film Booking Offices of America
- Distributed by: Film Booking Offices of America
- Release date: December 11, 1927
- Running time: 50 minutes
- Country: United States
- Language: English

The Swift Shadow is a 1927 American action film directed by Jerome Storm and written by Ethel Hill. The film stars Ranger the Dog, Lorraine Eason, William Bertram, Sam Nelson, Albert J. Smith and Milburn Morante. The film was released on December 11, 1927, by Film Booking Offices of America.

== Cast ==
- Ranger the Dog as Swift Shadow
- Lorraine Eason as Helen Todd
- William Bertram as Joseph Todd
- Sam Nelson as Jim
- Albert J. Smith as Butch Kemp
- Milburn Morante as Sheriff Miller
