= While There's Life =

1913 film

- Starring: Charlotte Burton; Jean Durrell
- Distributed by: Mutual Film
- Release date: September 1, 1913
- Running time: 1 reel (approximately 10 minutes)
- Country: United States
- Languages: Silent film English intertitles

While There's Life is a 1913 American silent short drama film starring Charlotte Burton, Jean Durrell, George Field, Robert Grey, and Billie West.
