= Personal Magnetism =

- Directed by: Lorimer Johnston
- Written by: A.O. Nelson (story)
- Starring: Louise Lovely; Sydney Ayres; Harry Van Meter
- Distributed by: Mutual Film
- Release date: December 18, 1913
- Country: United States
- Languages: Silent film English intertitles

Personal Magnetism is a 1913 American silent short film starring Sydney Ayres, Julius Frankenberg, Harry Van Meter, Jacques Jaccard, Louise Lester, Jack Richardson and Vivian Rich.
