= A Soul Astray =

- Directed by: Tom Ricketts
- Written by: Marie Layet
- Starring: Charlotte Burton; Edward Coxen; George Field
- Distributed by: Mutual Film Corporation
- Release date: May 11, 1914
- Country: United States
- Languages: Silent film English intertitles

A Soul Astray is a 1914 American silent short drama film directed by Tom Ricketts. The film stars Charlotte Burton, William Bertram, Edith Borella, Ed Coxen, Reaves Eason, George Field and Winifred Greenwood.
