= Spurs (film) =

1930 film

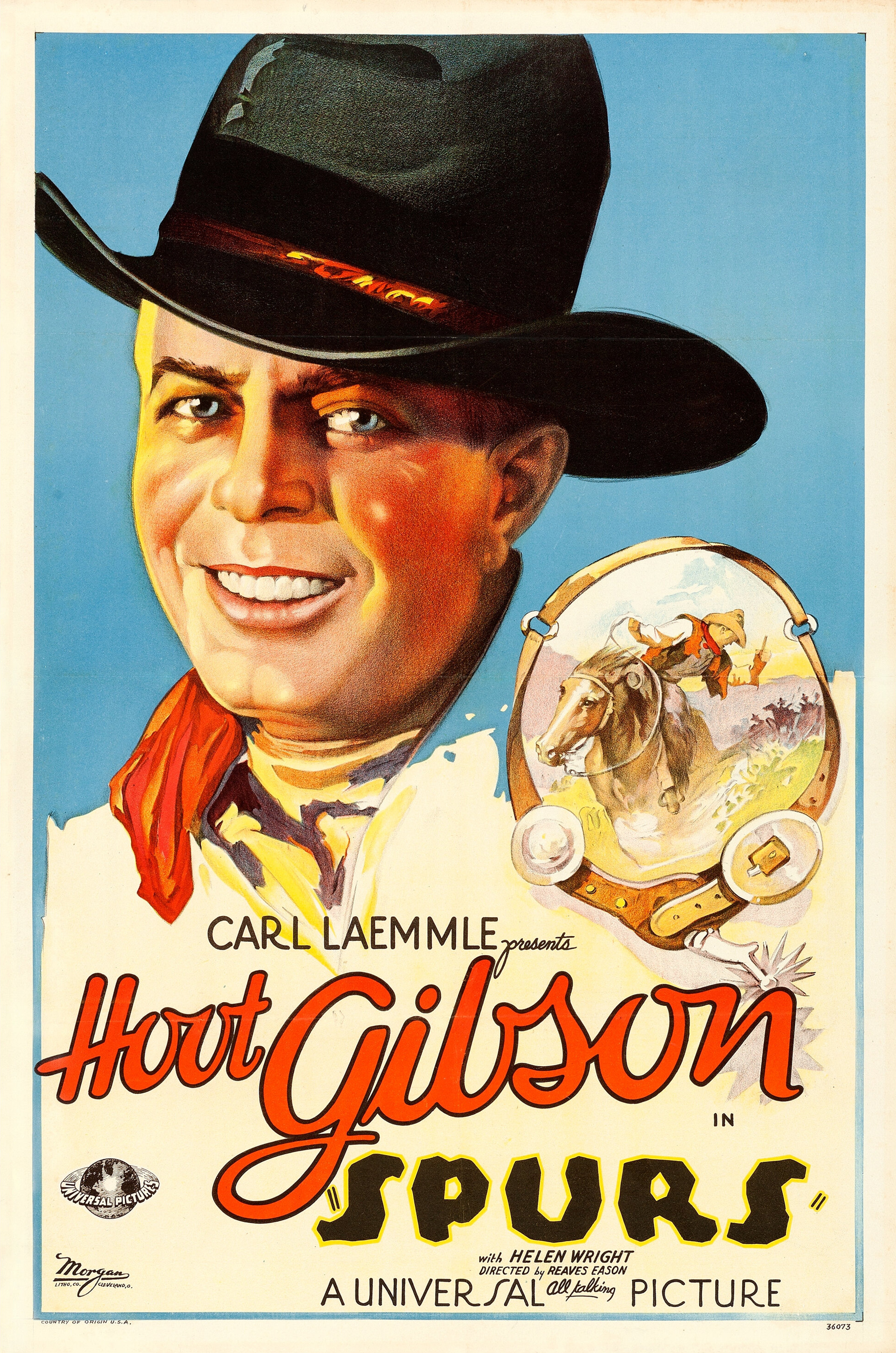
- Theatrical release poster
- Directed by: B. Reeves Eason
- Screenplay by: B. Reeves Eason
- Produced by: Hoot Gibson
- Starring: Hoot Gibson; Helen Wright; Robert Homans; Philo McCullough; C.E. Anderson; Buddy Hunter
- Cinematography: Harry Neumann
- Edited by: Gilmore Walker
- Production company: Universal Pictures
- Distributed by: Universal Pictures
- Release date: August 24, 1930
- Running time: 60 minutes
- Country: United States
- Language: English

Spurs is a 1930 American Western film written and directed by B. Reeves Eason and starring Hoot Gibson, Helen Wright, Robert Homans, Philo McCullough, C.E. Anderson and Buddy Hunter. It was released on August 24, 1930, by Universal Pictures.

== Plot ==
Looking for the killer of Buddy Hazlet's father, Bob Merrill and his friend secretly invade the hideout of the Pecos gang. After learning the true identity of the murderer and that the gang captured his friends Buddy and Shorty, Bob decides to wait for the gang to return to the hideout and fires on them with their own machine guns. The gang is captured and the murderer confesses his crimes.

== Cast ==
- Hoot Gibson as Bob Merril
- Helen Wright as Peggy Bradley
- Robert Homans as Dad Merril
- Philo McCullough as Tom Mardson
- C.E. Anderson as Pecos
- Buddy Hunter as Buddy Hazlet
- Gilbert Holmes as Shorty Clark
- William Bertram as Indian Joe
