= Calamity Anne's Love Affair =

1914 film

- Directed by: Tom Ricketts
- Written by: James Douglass
- Starring: Charlotte Burton; Louise Lester
- Distributed by: Mutual Film Corporation
- Release date: May 8, 1914
- Country: United States
- Languages: Silent; English intertitles

Calamity Anne's Love Affair is a 1914 American silent short Western directed by Tom Ricketts starring Charlotte Burton and Louise Lester as Calamity Anne. Also starring George Field, Edith Borella and B. Reeves Eason. It is the final film in the Calamity Anne series.
