= The Body in the Trunk =

- Directed by: John B. O'Brien
- Produced by: Majestic Motion Picture Company
- Starring: William Garwood; George Larkin; George Siegmann; Billie West
- Distributed by: Mutual Film
- Release date: May 3, 1914
- Running time: 2 reels
- Country: United States
- Languages: Silent film English intertitles

The Body in the Trunk is a 1914 American silent short drama film directed by John O' Brien starring William Garwood and George Larkin.

== Cast ==
- William Garwood
- Billie West
- George Larkin
- George Siegmann
