= Julius Frankenburg =

South African-American actor, director, playwright and inventor

Julius Frankenberg
- Born: January 1, 1871; South Africa
- Died: June 1964; age 93; Illinois, U.S.
- Other names: Jules Frankenberg
- Occupation(s): Actor, director, playwright, inventor
- Years active: 1910–1940

Julius Frankenberg (January 1, 1871 – June 1964) was a South African-American actor and director in silent film and on the stage, as well as a playwright and inventor. He starred in films such as The Haunted House, Personal Magnetism and A Blowout at Santa Banana working with actors such as Harry von Meter and Louise Lovely. He also directed two silent films.

== Early life and career ==
Born in South Africa to a German father, Julius Herbert Frankenberg, and a Dutch mother, F. Meier, Frankenberg served with distinction against the British in the Boer War; so much so that posters were placed all across the Transvaal, stating, "Capture! At all costs, dead or alive, the Little German Scout on a Big White Horse." He later escaped to Germany and, from there, emigrated to the United States, where he became a naturalized citizen in 1907.

== Filmography ==
- The Girl at the Cupola (1912)
- Betty Fools Dear Old Dad (1912)
- The Peanut Puzzle (1912) – Court Clerk
- The Miller of Burgundy (1912) – a collector
- Bread Upon the Waters (1912)
- The Lost Inheritance (1912)
- A Freight Train Drama (1912)
- The False Order (1913)
- The Understudy (1913) – Rudolph Lehar, the leader
- A Husband Won by Election (1913)
- The Food Chopper War (1913) – a drummer (billed as Julius Frankenberg)
- Pauline Cushman, the Federal Spy (1913) – Joe Martin, General Bragg's telegraph operator (billed as Julius Frankenberg)
- Absent-Minded Mr. Boob (1913), Mr. Boob (billed as Julius Frankenberg)
- Arabia Takes the Health Cure (1913)
- The Haunted House (1913) – Bob, the timorous lover (billed as Julius Frankenberg)
- Tobias Wants Out (1913)
- Personal Magnetism (1913) – Hiram Crabapple, hired man (billed as Julius Frankenberg)
- The Shriner's Daughter (Writer, 1914)
- A Blowout at Santa Banana (1914)
- The Cricket on the Hearth (1914)
- Italian Love (1914) – Tony Spezotti, Angelo's cousin (billed as Julius Frankenberg)
- The Peacock Feather Fan (1914)
- The Sealed Package (1914)
- The Land Just Over Yonder (Director, 1916) – Hasseyampa Jim Titus, Toyiabe's Partner (billed as Julius Frankenberg)
- Humanizing Mr. Winsby (Director, 1916) – The Pronto Kid (billed as Julius Frankenberg)
- The Adventures of Pietro (Writer/director, 1917) – Pietro (billed as Julius Frankenberg)
  - "Pietro the Detective"
  - "Pietro and the Black Handers"
  - "Pietro's Dream"
- Nine-Tenths of the Law (1918)

== Personal life and death ==
Frankenberg married at least twice; first in 1915 to Margareth Hampf, resulting in at least one child, a son who appeared with his father in "Pietro the Detective", the first installment of Frankenberg's 1917 serial, The Adventures of Pietro. The second marriage produced at least two children: a daughter, Irene, and a son, Richard.

Frankenburg died at age 93 in Illinois in November 1964.
