= The Wrong Birds =

- Written by: Edith Roberts
- Starring: Edith Borella; Charlotte Burton; George Field; Edward Coxen
- Distributed by: Mutual Film
- Release date: September 2, 1914
- Country: United States
- Languages: Silent; English intertitles

The Wrong Birds is a 1914 American silent short drama film starring Edith Borella, Charlotte Burton, George Field, and Ed Coxen.

== Cast ==
- Edward Coxen as Dick Wayne - the Groom (as Ed Coxen)
- Charlotte Burton as Dorothy Dean - the Bride
- George Field as Squire Hopper - the Sheriff
- Edith Borella as Nell Jackson
- William Tedmarsh as Jim Thomas
