= The Girl Bandits' Hoodoo =

1912 film by Kalem Company

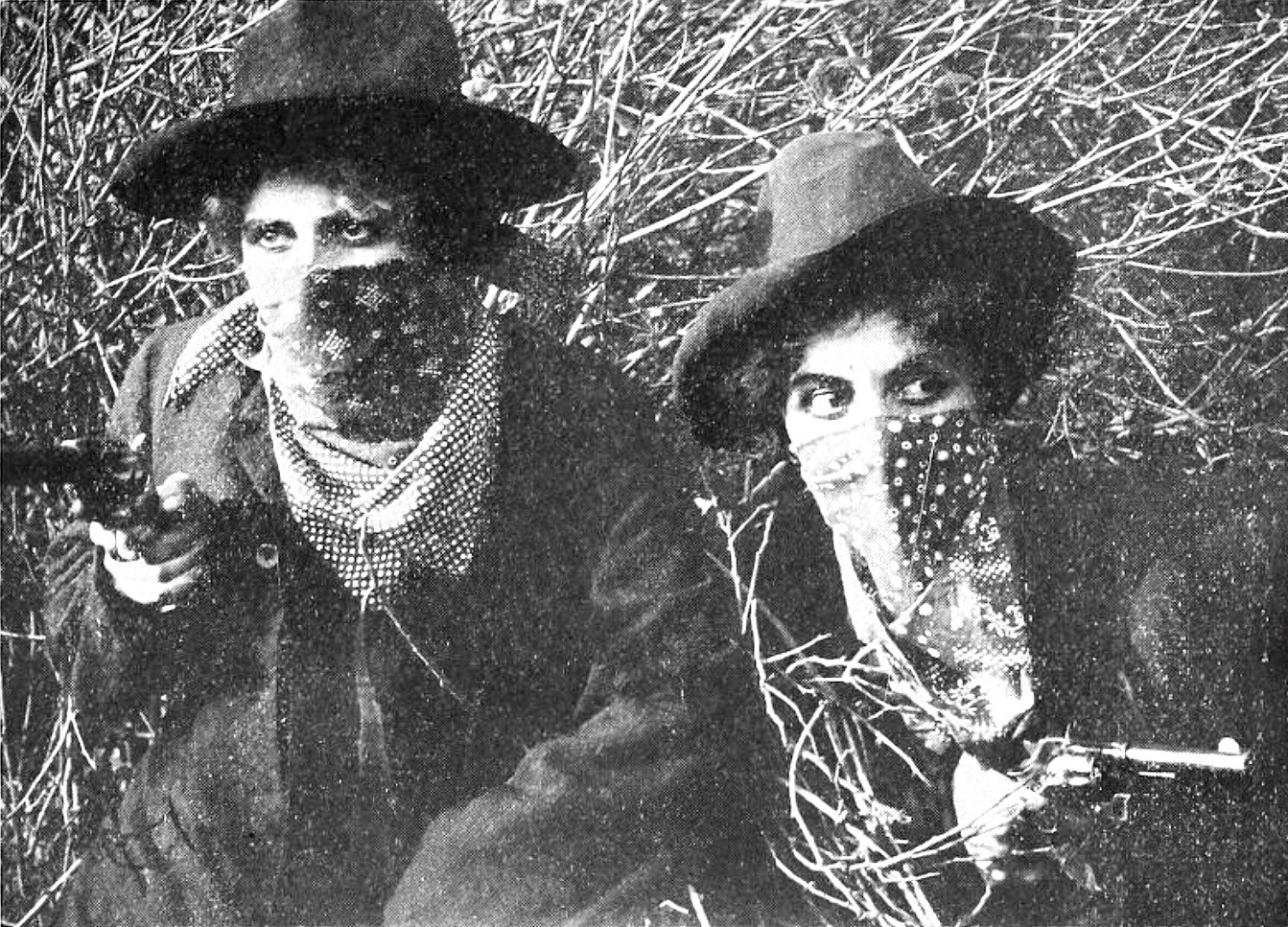
- Film still showing actress Ruth Roland (left) as Nell and Marin Sais as Bess
- Directed by: Pat Hartigan
- Produced by: Kalem Company and filmed in Santa Monica, California
- Starring: Ruth Roland; Marin Sais; Edward Coxen
- Release date: July 1, 1912
- Running time: 15 minutes, 35mm 1 reel (1000 feet) (Note: According to the reference How Movies Work by Bruce F. Kawin (New York: Macmillan Publishing Company, 1987, pp. 46-47), a full 1000-foot reel of film in the silent era had a maximum running time of 15-16 minutes. Silent films were generally projected at an average or "standard" speed of 16 frames per second, much slower than the 24 frames of later sound films.)
- Country: United States
- Languages: Silent film English intertitles

The Girl Bandits' Hoodoo is a lost 1912 silent film, a "Western comedy" produced by the Kalem Company of New York City at its West Coast studio in Santa Monica, California. (Note: Kalem, like many other early film companies in the United States, began to relocate its operations from the eastern part of the nation to California during the 1910s. The company in 1910 opened its first studio in Glendale in 1910, followed by the establishment of another one, in Santa Monica, the next year.) The motion picture starred Ruth Roland and Marin Sais in the title roles with support from Edward Coxen.

With regard to this film's title, in the United States in 1912, in the parlance of that time, the word "hoodoo" served as slang for something or someone who attracts bad luck or misfortune. Today the title could be interpreted as "The Girl Bandits' Bad Luck".

No footage of this motion picture is listed among the holdings of major film repositories in either North America or Europe or in known private collections. This Kalem release is therefore considered to be a lost film.

== Plot ==
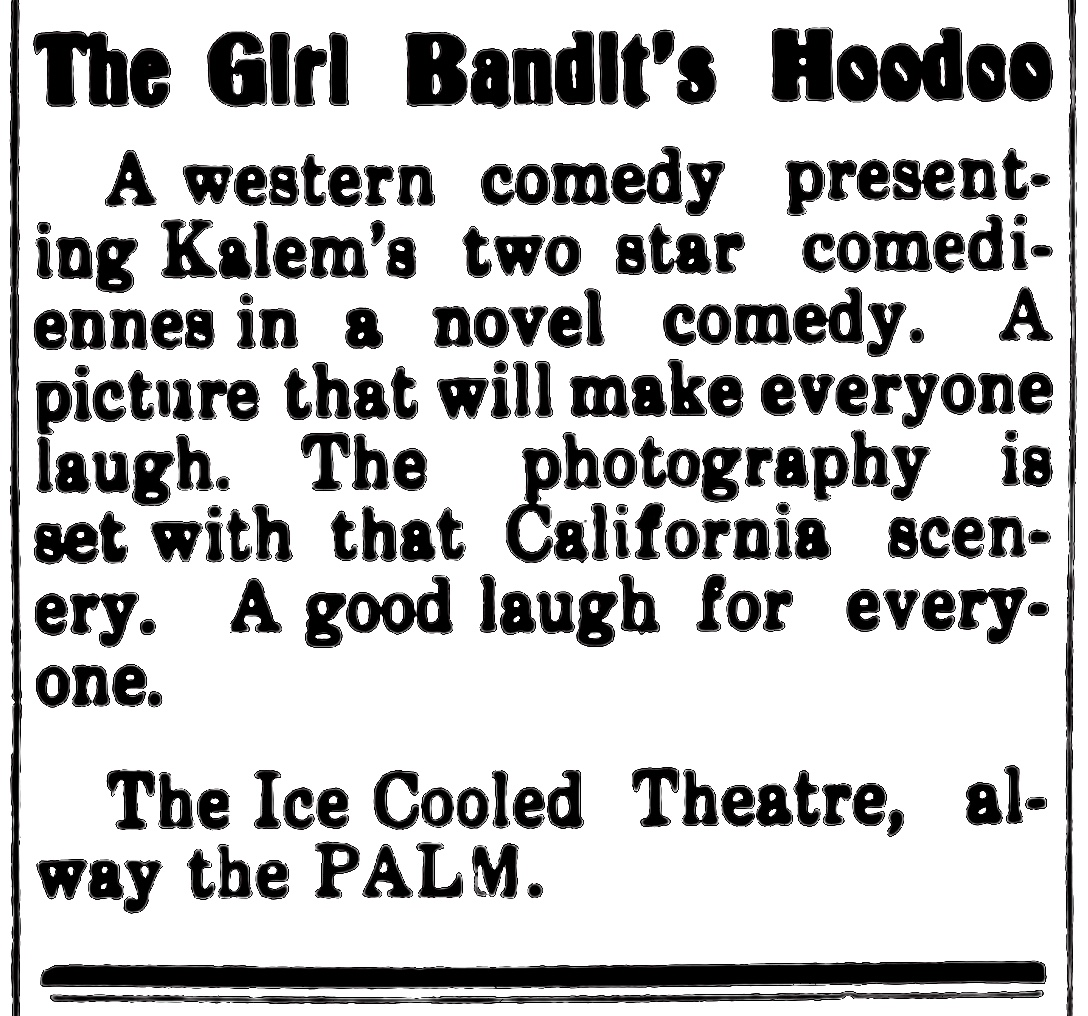
Newspaper item announcing the screening of the film (with punctuation error in title) at the "Ice Cooled" Palm Theatre in Missouri Valley, Iowa, July 11, 1912

A plot summary of the comedy is published in the June 29, 1912 issue of the trade publication The Moving Picture World. That summary was copied verbatim from a storyline furnished earlier by Kalem in its promotions of the one-reeler, most notably in the June 15, 1912 issue of the Kalem Kalendar:

While Tom boasts of his bravery and marksmanship the stage coach arrives and excited passengers tell of a recent hold-up. Tom is inclined to laugh at the Sheriff for his negligence and declares that no one could hold him up. Nell and Bess, Tom's sisters, determine to teach the braggart a lesson.

A few days later when Tom starts for town in his auto, the girls unload his revolver and substitute blanks. They then hasten to disguise themselves as bandits and proceeding to the highway await the return of the boaster. It happens that Tom loans his machine to a friend, Bagley, and that worthy gentleman's identity being lost by ulster and goggles, the girls relieve him of his valuables, thinking him to be their brother. As Bagley rides out of sight he fires at the supposed bandits and a bullet pierces Nell's hat. This throws the girls into consternation as they cannot account for the efficiency of a revolver which they believe is loaded with blanks.

Their first surprise is mild compared to what greets them when they return home and hide their disguises. Tom arrives and incidentally displays [a] watch and purse. The girls then inspect the captured valuables and find they belong to Bagley.

Fully repentant, the amateur bandits set forth that night to return Bagley's belongings. The unfortunate man has become apprehensive and engages the sheriff to protect his house. The girls are therefore captured by the vigilant official and the manner in which they clear themselves brings a laughable finale which is best told in the film.

== Cast ==
- Ruth Roland as Nell
- Marin Sais as Bess
- Edward Coxen as the sheriff
- Uncredited actor as Nell and Bess's brother Tom (Note: Although the person who performed as Tom is not identified in Kalem's promotion of this film, it was likely Marshall Neilan, a young actor who in 1912 was one of the small group of "principal artists" who composed Santa Monica’s company of players, working alongside Ruth Roland, Marin Sais, Edward Coxen, and John E. Brennan.)
- Uncredited actor as Bagley (Note: The person who played Bagley is also unidentified in period publications, but he may have been either John E. Brennen, another one of the contracted actors in the Santa Monica company, or director Pat Hartigan, who at times also performed on camera, such as in Kalem's 1912 productions The Mine Swindler and A Mountain Tragedy. See cited 1912 publications of Kalem Kalendar for cast information.)

== Production ==
The Girl Bandits' Hoodoo was among the early "photoplays" produced by Kalem at the second studio or "company" it established in California, the one that began operations in Santa Monica in 1911. The other West Coast site, in Glendale, had been set up the previous year. (Note: Some film history references erroneously state that Kalem's Glendale company closed in 1911 and reopened that year in Santa Monica. The two locations actually coexisted and were operating independently in 1911 and continued to do so for years. See 1911 and 1912 issues of Kalem Kalendar for numerous news items about projects at the two separate California companies.) Each Kalem location was administered as a single, self-contained production company, much like in repertory theatre, with each unit composed of a director, a select group of actors or "principal artists", and a small production crew. The personnel in Santa Monica, as in Glendale, all worked as a team, performing together repeatedly, producing one film project after another. The Girl Bandits' Hoodoo, in keeping with the vast majority of Kalem's releases in the early 1910s, was a one-reeler with a final running length of approximately 1000 feet, and it was filmed in one week or less. Pat C. Hartigan in 1912 was in charge of directing all the productions for the Santa Monica company, which quickly became a unit that specialized in comedies and Westerns. The Girl Bandits' Hoodoo therefore proved to be an ideal blending of both types of motion pictures. (Note: Kalem's existing studio in Glendale, California, the company's continuing operations back in New York, and its "winter studio" in Jacksonville, Florida were already producing many of Kalem's romantic dramas, Civil War releases, and other productions in different genres.)

Ruth Roland and Marin Sais, the film's title characters, were at the time of filming 19 and 21 years old respectively. Having begun their work with Kalem the year before this production's release, both performers became closely identified with comedies and Westerns while working at the Santa Monica location. They would go on to star in a number of features for Kalem Company, often performing opposite fellow company actors Marshall Neilan, Edward Coxen, and John E. Brennan. (Note: Later in the silent era and subsequent sound era in the American film industry, a "feature" was categorized as a film with a running time of at least 60 minutes. In the early silent era, within the period this comedy was produced, most releases were one-reelers with maximum durations between just 15 to 16 minutes. Despite their brief running times, in both advertising and in film commentaries those productions were referred to as "features". Refer to Bruce F. Kawin's work How Movies Work, which is cited in more detail under this page's references.) Kalem's one-reelers from Santa Monica, like those produced by other companies of actors at Kalem's in Glendale, at its continuing operations in New York, and at the "winter studio" in Jacksonville, Florida took a week or less to film.

== Release, promotion, and distribution ==
Kalem officially released the film in the United States on July 1, 1912, and widely promoted Ruth Roland and Marin Sais as the "Two Star Comediennes in a Novel Farce Comedy". Examinations of available trade journals and newspapers from that period reveal neither critical reviews relating to the overall quality of the film nor reports of audience reactions to the "big feature motion picture". Remarks about the comedy were generally tied to theater advertisements simply intent on attracting customers to the box office. Just five days after its release, the Gem Theatre in Hattiesburg, Mississippi promoted the film by assuring ticket-buyers they would experience "thrills and many a hearty laugh".

The film continued to circulate to theaters across the United States for more than a year after its initial distribution, reaching increasingly more remote venues by the spring and summer of 1913. By March 1913, the comedy was playing in small communities in northeastern Oregon, including at the Dreamland Theatre in Athena. In Wyoming, in Cody, the front page of the April 18, 1913 issue of the Northern Wyoming Herald announces the presentation of Kalem's one-reeler in a "new film service" offered at the local opera house, with the comedy being touted as one of the "good clear pictures" among "the best line of pictures ever shown in this city". By June and July 1913, the Western comedy had even reached distant communities in what was then the Territory of Alaska. The Orpheum Theater in Valdez invited local residents on June 4 to see the "rip-roaring comedy", along with the presentation of another feature, the two-reel Vitagraph drama Auld Lang Syne. Over 700 miles south of Valdez, in the small gold-mining town of Ketchikan, Alaska, the local newspaper announces in its July 11, 1913 edition that the community's Dream Theatre would be screening The Girl Bandits' Hoodoo.

== Lost film ==
No full or partial copy of The Girl Bandits' Hoodoo in any format is listed among the holdings of major film repositories and silent-film databases in North America and Europe, including the Library of Congress, the George Eastman Museum, the Museum of Modern Art's collection of moving images, the UCLA Film and Television Archives, the National Film Preservation Foundation, the Library and Archives Canada (LAC), the British Film Institute, Cinémathèque Française, the EYE Filmmuseum in Amsterdam, and other catalogs for silent motion pictures accessible through the European Film Gateway (EFG). Perhaps a negative or positive copy of this one-reeler or at least an original 35mm fragment from the film will be discovered in a wayward storage area or in an unmarked film can in the recesses of some library. Currently, though, like the vast majority of other motion pictures created by Kalem and other early studios in the United States, this production is considered to be lost.
