= The Wizard of the Nile =

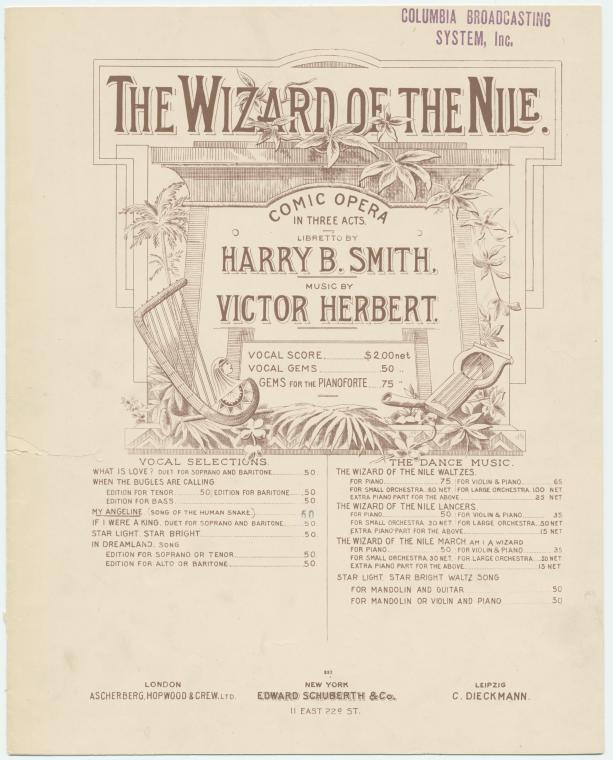
- Sheet music cover
- Music: Victor Herbert
- Lyrics: Harry B. Smith
- Book: Harry B. Smith
- Productions: 1895 Broadway

The Wizard of the Nile is a comic opera in three acts with music by composer Victor Herbert and a libretto by Harry B. Smith. This was Herbert's second comic opera after Prince Ananias, and was his first real success.

== Synopsis ==
Egypt suffers from a great dought. Kibosh, a Persian magician, is touring throughout the land. He offers to make the skies rain, and he does. But the rain causes disastrous flooding. King Ptolemy decrees that Kibosh will be sealed inside a tomb, but enthusiastic courtiers have inadvertently also sealed the king in the tomb with him. When they escape, the king is so happy that he pardons Kibosh.

At the same time Cleopatra and her music teacher, Ptarmigan, have a romance. However, though they separate as Cleopatra awaits the arrival of Mark Antony.

== Performance history ==
The Wizard of the Nile premiered at the Grand Opera House in Wilkes-Barre, Pennsylvania on September 26, 1895, produced by the Frank Daniels Comic Opera Company. This was immediately followed by performances in Pittsburgh, Pennsylvania beginning September 30, 1895. The opera then had runs at theaters in Buffalo, New York, Detroit, and Chicago before transferring to Broadway. The work's New York premiere took place at the Casino Theatre where it opened on November 4, 1895. It ran at that theatre for 105 performances; closing on February 1, 1896. The performances were conducted by music director Frank Palma. The opera was staged by director Napier Lothian, and used costumes by Caroline Siedle and sets by Ernest Albert.

The production starred the comedian Frank Daniels in the title role of the wizard Kibosh. His character from this stage work is credited as popularizing the slang word "wiz" in the English-language as the character had a repeating catchphrase "Am I Wiz?" after accomplishing several clever and difficult tricks successfully. Others in the cast included Louise Royce as the wizard's apprentice Abydos, Dorothy Morton as Cleopatra, Walter Allen as Ptolemy, and Edwin Isham as Cleopatra's music teacher Ptarmigan, Mary Palmer as Simoona, and Louis Casavant as Cheops.

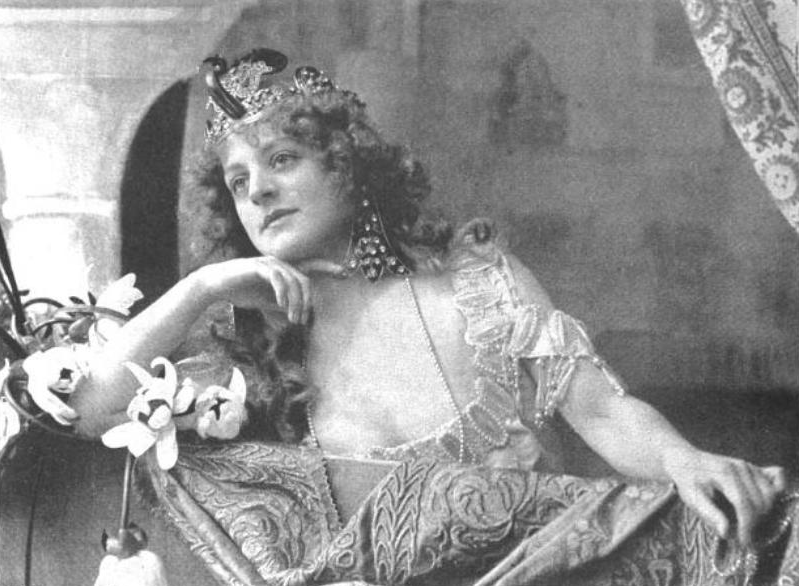
Adele Ritchie in the London production, 1897

After the Broadway run ended, The Wizard of the Nile toured the United States successfully in the 1896–1897 season; presenting more than 500 performances of the opera on tour. The work also was successful in Europe and established Herbert's reputation as on operetta composer of note on the international stage. The European premiere of the opera was presented in a German language translation entitled Der Zauberer vom Nil at the Carltheater in Vienna, and was a critical and popular success. Subsequently, a production was mounted in London's West End at the Shaftesbury Theatre where the opera was given its UK premiere to a warm reception on September 6, 1897. The London production was choreographed by John D'Auban.

Major songs include the waltz "Star Light, Star Bright", "My Angeline", "Pure and White is the Lotus", "Stonecutter's Song", "Cleopatra's Wedding Day", and "If I Were A King".

== Roles and original cast ==
- Kibosh, a Persian magician – Frank Daniels
- Abydos, his apprentice – Louise Royce
- Ptolemy, King of Egypt – Walter Allen
- Simoona, Ptolemy's second wife – Mary Palmer
- Cleopatra, a Princess who knows naught of love – Dorothy Morton
- Ptarmigan, Cleopatra's music teacher – Edwin Isham
- Cheops, the royal weather bureau – Louis Casavant
- Obeliska, captain of the Amazons – Helen Redmond
- Netocris, lieutenant of the Amazons – Claudia Carlstedt
- Merza, first maid-of-honor to Cleopatra – Grace Rutter

== Musical numbers ==
- Overture

Act I – Public Square in Alexandria.

- No. 1 Ensemble – "Aïah! Aïah! Aïah! Aïah! Father Nile, keep us in thy care"
- No. 2 Obeliska and Cheops, with Chorus – "He's not egotistic, but most optimistic"
- No. 3 Oriental March – "Strew the way with flow'rets blooming"
- No. 4 Ptolemy, Simoona and Chorus – "I am the ruler of the whole Egyptian nation"
- No. 5 Kibosh and Chorus – "Of all the magicians of lofty positions who give exhibitions, I'm easily King."
- No. 6a Chorus – "Pure and white is the Lotos Lily flower, tira la!"
- No. 6b Chorus and Cleopatra – "I have been a-maying, though the month is June"
- No. 7 Kibosh and Cleopatra – "Tell me, tell me prithee tell me"
- No. 8 Ptarmigan – "If it were for me to lead to glory"
- No. 9 Finale Act I – "Strew the way with flow'rets blooming, deck the paths with garlands gay."

Act II – Terraced roof of the King's palace.

- No. 10 Serenade, with Abydos and Cheops – "List to our matin serenade, Princess, Princess fair"
- No. 10a Scene – (in which Kibosh is pursued by an alligator, which eventually retreats in disgust)
- No. 11 Ptarmigan and Cleopatra – "If I were a King, I would kneel, sweetheart, to thee"
- No. 12 Cleopatra, Abydos, Simoona, Ptolemy and Cheops – "On Cleopatra's wedding day"
- No. 13 Kibosh and Chorus – "She kept her secret well"
- No. 14 Finale Act II – "Oh agony, unutterable woe!"

Act III – Interior of the King's private pyramid.

- No. 15 Introduction and Stonecutters' Song, Ptarmigan and Male Chorus – "Work away, work away with a song, my boys."
- No. 16 Cleopatra – "I seem to have known you my whole life long"
- No. 16a Entrance of Kibosh, Simoona, Ptolemy and Cheops
- No. 17 Waltz Quintette: Abydos, Simoona, Kibosh, Cheops and Ptolemy – "When sitting alone at eventide"
- No. 18 Pages' Chorus – "To the pyramid softly stealing now we come"
- No. 19 Echo Duet – Kibosh, Ptolemy and Pages - "In our bravery we're peerless"
- No. 20 Finale Act III – "Ah! love we know"

== Bibliography ==
- Bordman, Gerald Martin; Norton, Richard (2010). American Musical Theatre: A Chronicle. Oxford University Press. ISBN 9780199729708.
- Everett, William A.; Laird, Paul R. (2009). "The Wizard of the Nile". The A to Z of the Broadway Musical. Scarecrow Press. ISBN 9780810870444.
- Franceschina, John (2004). Harry B. Smith: Dean of American Librettists. Taylor & Francis. ISBN 9781135949082.
- Neil Gould (2009). Victor Herbert: A Theatrical Life. Fordham University Press. ISBN 9780823228737.
- Letellier, Robert Ignatius (2015). Operetta: A Sourcebook, Volume II. Cambridge Scholars Publishing. ISBN 9781443885089.
- Traubner, Richard (2004). "American operetta". Operetta: A Theatrical History. Taylor & Francis. ISBN 9781135887834.
- Ken Wlaschin (September 24, 2009). Encyclopedia of American Opera. McFarland, Incorporated, Publishers. ISBN 978-0-7864-4596-7.
