= Billie West =

American actress

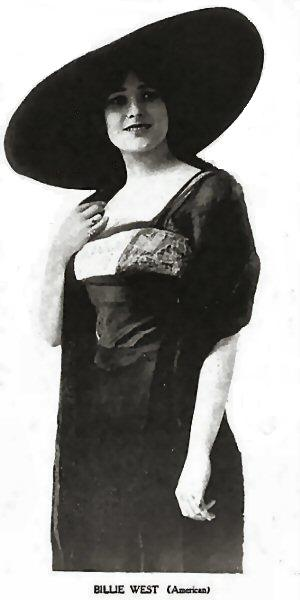
- The Motion Picture Story Magazine, 1915
- Born: August 5, 1891; Louisville, Kentucky, U.S.
- Died: June 7, 1967 (aged 75); Plainfield, New Jersey, U.S.
- Occupation: Actress
- Years active: 1912-1917
- Spouse: Frank Fisher Bennett

Billie West (August 5, 1891 – June 7, 1967) was an American actress of the silent era. She appeared in more than 60 films between 1912 and 1917.

West was born in Louisville, Kentucky, and had two brothers. West left home in 1910 to begin her career. She performed in vaudeville, in musical comedy and as an ingenue in stock theater in St. Louis. Film companies for which West worked included Vitagraph, Pathe Freres, and the Broncho Company.

West was married to Frank Fisher Bennett. In 1917, less than a year after they wed, West was released from her film contract to help her seriously ill mother. They eventually settled in Warren Township, New Jersey, building a house on property adjacent to his parents' home. West died in Plainfield, New Jersey.

== Selected filmography ==
- Apartment No. 13 (1912)
- While There's Life (1913)
- Through the Neighbor's Window (1913)
- The House in the Tree (1913)
- Fate's Decree (1914)
- The Body in the Trunk (1914)
- The Highbinders (1915)
- The Living Death (1915)
- The Hidden Spring (1917)
