= Josephine Ditt =

US film actress

Josephine Ditt, born on September 7, 1868, in Chicago and died on October 18, 1939, in Los Angeles, was a film actress in the United States. She appeared in numerous silent films and married actor and director Tom Ricketts. Her role in Damaged Goods was described as one of the most difficult ever conceived.

== Filmography ==
- Romantic Redskins (1910)
- The Bachelor and the Baby (1912)
- Lottery Ticket Number 13 (1912)
- The Foreign Spy (1912)
- Maud Muller (1912)
- A Foreign Spy (1913)
- Calamity Anne in Society (1914)
- The Hermit (1914)
- The Lost Treasure (1914)
- The Professor's Awakening (1914)
- A Modern Free-Lance (1914)
- Her Fighting Chance (1914)
- In the Moonlight (1914)
- At the End of a Perfect Day (1914)
- False Gods (1914)
- This Is th' Life (1914)
- Lodging for the Night (1914)
- Daylight (1914)
- The Ruin of Manley (1914)
- In the Candlelight (1914)
- The Girl in Question (1914)
- The Tin Can Shack (1914)
- Damaged Goods (1914)
- The Town of Nazareth (1914)
- The Alarm of Angelon (1915)
- Refining Fires (1915)
- The Crucifixion of Al Brady (1915)
- Silence (1915)
- The Decision (1915)
- Ancestry (1915)
- Reformation (1915)
- His Brother's Debt (1915)
- The Problem (1915)
- The Castle Ranch (1915)
- The Honor of the District Attorney of Reaves Eason (1915)
- In the Twilight (1915)
- The House of a Thousand Scandals (1915)
- Secretary of Frivolous Affairs (1915)
