= The Living Death (film) =

1915 film

- Directed by: Tod Browning
- Starring: F. A. Turner; Billie West
- Release date: June 6, 1915
- Running time: 2 reels
- Country: United States
- Language: Silent with English intertitles

The Living Death is a 1915 American short drama film directed by Tod Browning.

== Cast ==
- F. A. Turner as Dr. Farrell
- Billie West as Naida Farrell
- Edward Peil Sr. as Tom O Day (as Edward Peil)
