= Napier Lothian Jr. =

American theatre manager, talent manager, actor and theatre director

Napier Lothian Jr. (1855 – January 3, 1903) was an American theatre manager, talent manager, actor, and theatre director. He should not be confused with his father, the actor, conductor, flageoletist, and violinist Napier Lothian Sr. (1836–1916).

== Life and career ==
Born in San Francisco, California in 1855, Napier Lothian Jr. was the son of Napier Lothian Sr.; an unsuccessful gold miner who had participated in the California Gold Rush. His mother was the British dancer Clara Chapman Rivers who married his father in San Francisco. In 1856 Lothian Sr. became an actor in the San Francisco Minstrels. In 1859 both of Lothian Jr.'s parents were engaged in Christy's Minstrels, and the family traveled with that company to New York City where Lothian Sr. became a celebrated flageoletist on the New York stage.

In 1862, the entire Lothian family, including the seven-year old Lothian Jr., were engaged by the Morris Brothers minstrels from Boston. The family moved from New York City to Boston upon taking this engagement. Lothian Jr. made his professional stage debut at Ordway Hall (then known as the Morris Brothers Opera House) in May 1862 and continued to be active on the stage throughout his youth. His father went on to have a highly successful career as a music director in Boston and Broadway at several theaters, including posts at The Boston Theatre and Niblo's Garden.

As an adult, Lothian Jr. became a successful theatre manager, theatre director, and talent manager. He served posts as the manager of two theatre's in Boston: the Continental Theatre and The Boston Theatre; serving at the latter theatre while his father was music director for over two decades. For several years he was the manager of the touring acting troupe, the Quincy Adams Sawyer Company. As a talent manager, he managed the careers of actresses Mary Anderson, Julia Arthur, and Henrietta Crosman. In 1895 he directed The Wizard of the Nile at Broadway's Casino Theatre.

He died in Boston, Massachusetts on January 3, 1903; thirteen years before the death of his father.
