= Fate's Decree =

- Starring: William Garwood; Richard Cummings; Fred Hamer; Justin MacDonald; Billie West
- Distributed by: Mutual Film
- Release date: February 14, 1914
- Country: United States
- Languages: Silent film English intertitles

Fate's Decree is a 1914 American silent short drama film starring William Garwood, Richard Cummings, Fred Hamer, Justin MacDonald, and Billie West.
