= Grant Wallace =

American journalist (1868–1954)

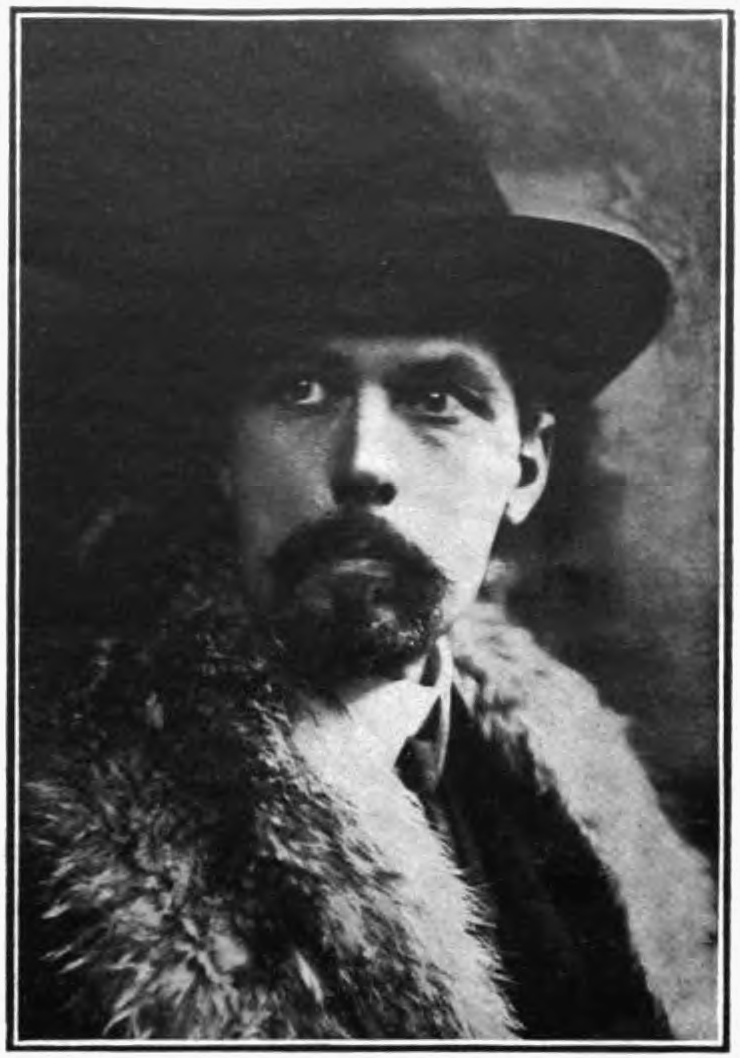
- Portrait of Grant Wallace
- Born: February 10, 1867; Hopkins, Missouri, US
- Died: December 18, 1954 (aged 87); Berkeley, California, US
- Education: Western Normal College, Shenandoah, Iowa (B.S.); Art Students League of New York
- Occupations: Journalist, artist, screenwriter, Esperantist and occultist.

Grant Wallace (1867–1954) was an American journalist, artist, screenwriter, Esperantist and occultist. He wrote short stories and screen plays, including two black-and-white silent movies.

== Early life ==
Grant Wallace was born on February 10, 1867, in Hopkins, Missouri, the son of a judge. His education included a B.S. from Western Normal College in Shenandoah, Iowa, in 1889, and art classes from the Art Students League of New York.

== Career ==
In the 1890s, Wallace worked as a newspaper artist and reporter in Saint Paul, Minnesota, at the St. Paul Pioneer Press, before he moved to San Francisco. There, he worked for the San Francisco Chronicle and San Francisco Examiner as an editorial and feature writer, and as a war correspondent for the Evening Bulletin in Japan and China. He wrote short stories and screen plays, including for two black-and-white silent movies: the story for A Blowout at Santa Banana (1914), and the scenario for the movie The Fuel of Life (1917). He also lectured on the occult.

In this period, Wallace was also a promoter of the international language Esperanto and he was the editor of the San Francisco Esperantist.

== Occultism ==
"TAH-NEZH OF MARS - Station MARS Broadcasting?" drawing by Grant Wallace

After World War I, Wallace built a small cabin in the forest near Carmel-by-the-Sea, California, using it as a laboratory for experimenting with telepathy, which he sometimes referred to as "mental radio". He made hundreds of drawings, charts, diagrams, and writings, attempting to reveal the patterns of life, including reincarnation, communication with intelligent life on other planets, and with dead spirits. He wrote about messages from the dead, from ancient Greeks, ancient Egyptians, Vikings, and Atlanteans, to more recent dead, such as Thomas Jefferson and Charles Darwin, and transcribed messages from and drew pictures of extraterrestrial life, especially from the Pleiades star cluster.

He showed newspaper readers what a good columnist and illustrator was like, made a lively war correspondent (Jap-Russo) became a hunter of big game, helped settle a colonization on a cocoanut Island off Mexico, thought he'd write some books of serious importance; he did; then decided to devote his life to science! He makes exquisite drawings in color of incarnated figures of historical personages. His pen and ink drawings appear in magazines. His pen is busy telling stories in both word and line.

— Carmel Pine Cone

== Death ==
Wallace died on August 12, 1954, in Berkeley, California.

His works were recovered from his Carmel cabin after his death, and some of his art and diagrams were included in The End is Near! Visions of Apocalypse, Millennium and Utopia (ISBN 0-9664272-7-0), published by Dilettante Press in 1998.
