= Edith Borella =

American actress

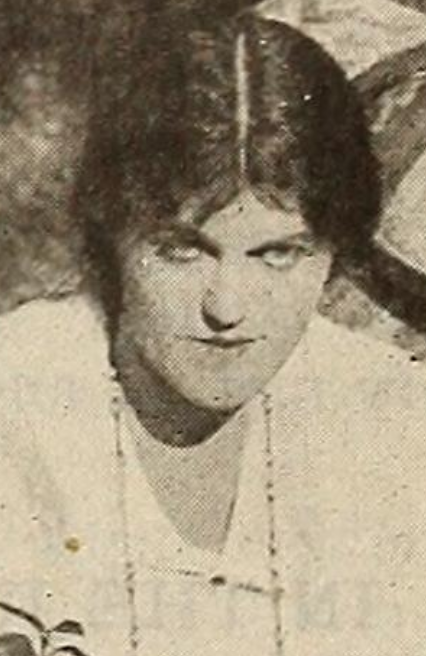
- Edith Borella, from a 1915 publication
- Born: November 25, 1890
- Died: March 6, 1974 (aged 83); Los Angeles, California, U.S.
- Occupation: Actress
- Spouse: Edward Coxen (1914–1954; his death)

Edith Borella (November 25, 1890 - March 6, 1974) was an American silent film actress of Swiss descent. She starred in films such as the 1913 film Through the Neighbor's Window with Charlotte Burton which was her debut. Her career only lasted two years between 1913 and 1915 but in that period of time she starred in 46 films. She married English-American actor Edward Coxen in 1914.

== Selected filmography ==
- Through the Neighbor's Window (1913)
- The Shriner's Daughter (1913)
- The Power of Light (1914)
- A Blowout at Santa Banana (1914)
- The Widow's Investment (1914)
- The Man Who Came Back (1914)
- In the Footprints of Mozart (1914)
- At the End of a Perfect Day (1914)
- The Widow (1914)
- The Story of the Olive (1914)
- Calamity Anne's Love Affair (1914)
- A Soul Astray (1914)
- Mein Lieber Katrina Catches a Convict (1914)
- The Lure of the Sawdust (1914)
- The Butterfly (1914)
- Their Worldly Goods (1914)
- This Is th' Life (1914)
- The Song of the Sea Shell (1914)
- The Wrong Birds (1914)
- The Redemption of a Pal (1914)
- A Slice of Life (1914)
- The Strength o' Ten (1914)
- The Unseen Vengeance (1914)
- Daylight (1914)
- Down by the Sea (1914)
- The Ruin of Manley (1914)
- Restitution (1915)
- Imitations (1915)
- In the Sunlight (1915)
