= Refining Fires =

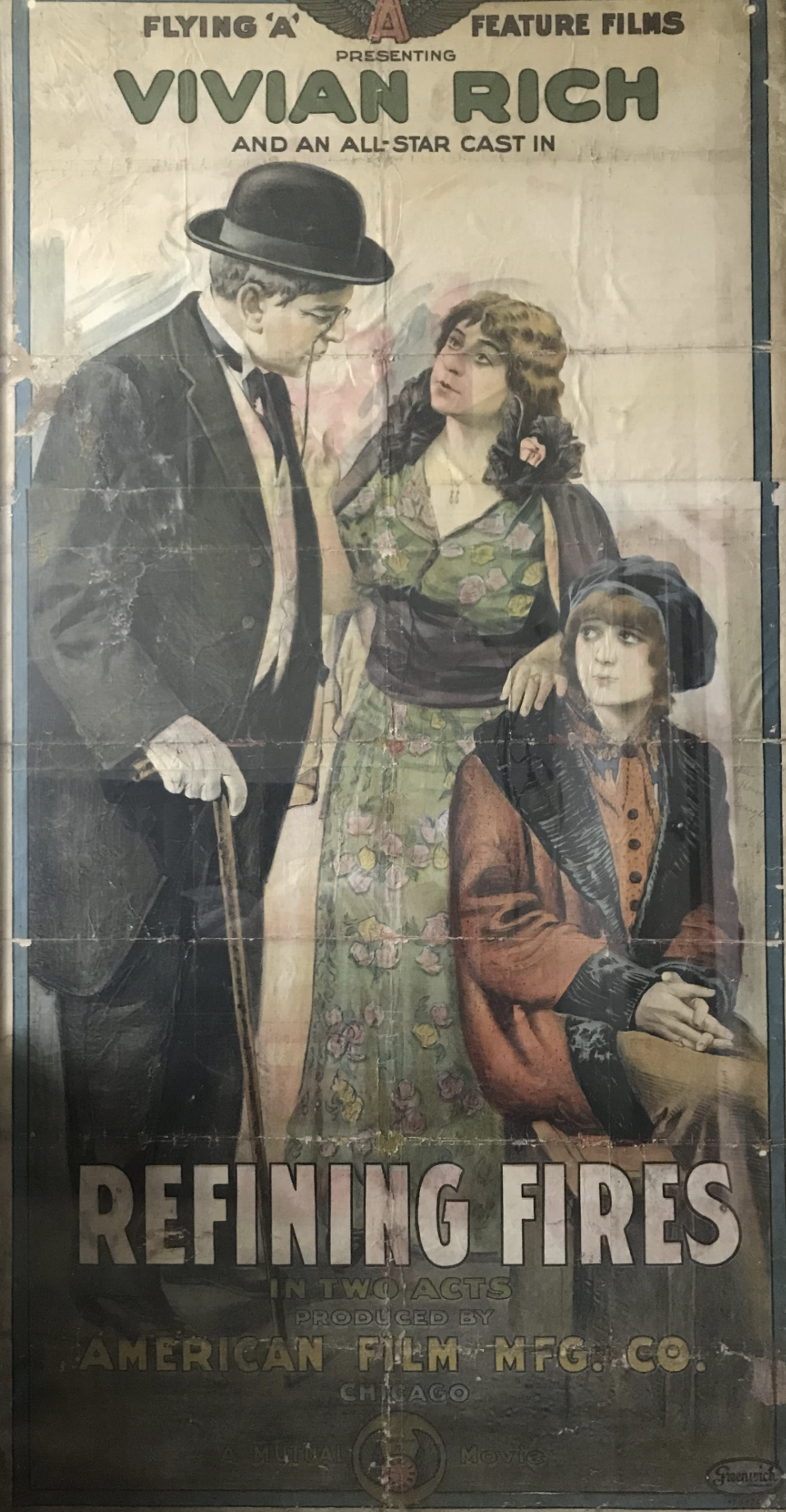
- Refining Fires 1915 movie poster
- Directed by: Tom Ricketts
- Written by: Elizabeth R. Carpenter
- Starring: Harry Van Meter; Charlotte Burton; Jean Durrell; Louise Lester; Jack Richardson; Vivian Rich
- Distributed by: Mutual Film
- Release date: January 18, 1915
- Country: United States
- Languages: Silent film English intertitles

Refining Fires is a 1915 American silent short drama film directed by Tom Ricketts. The story is about a man and a woman from different socioeconomic backgrounds who live together before marriage. The man and woman break up and the woman's life is changed forever.

== Background ==
The film was released on January 18, 1915 and stars Harry Van Meter, Charlotte Burton, Jean Durrell, Louise Lester, Jack Richardson, and Vivian Rich. The film was directed by Tom Ricketts.

== Plot ==
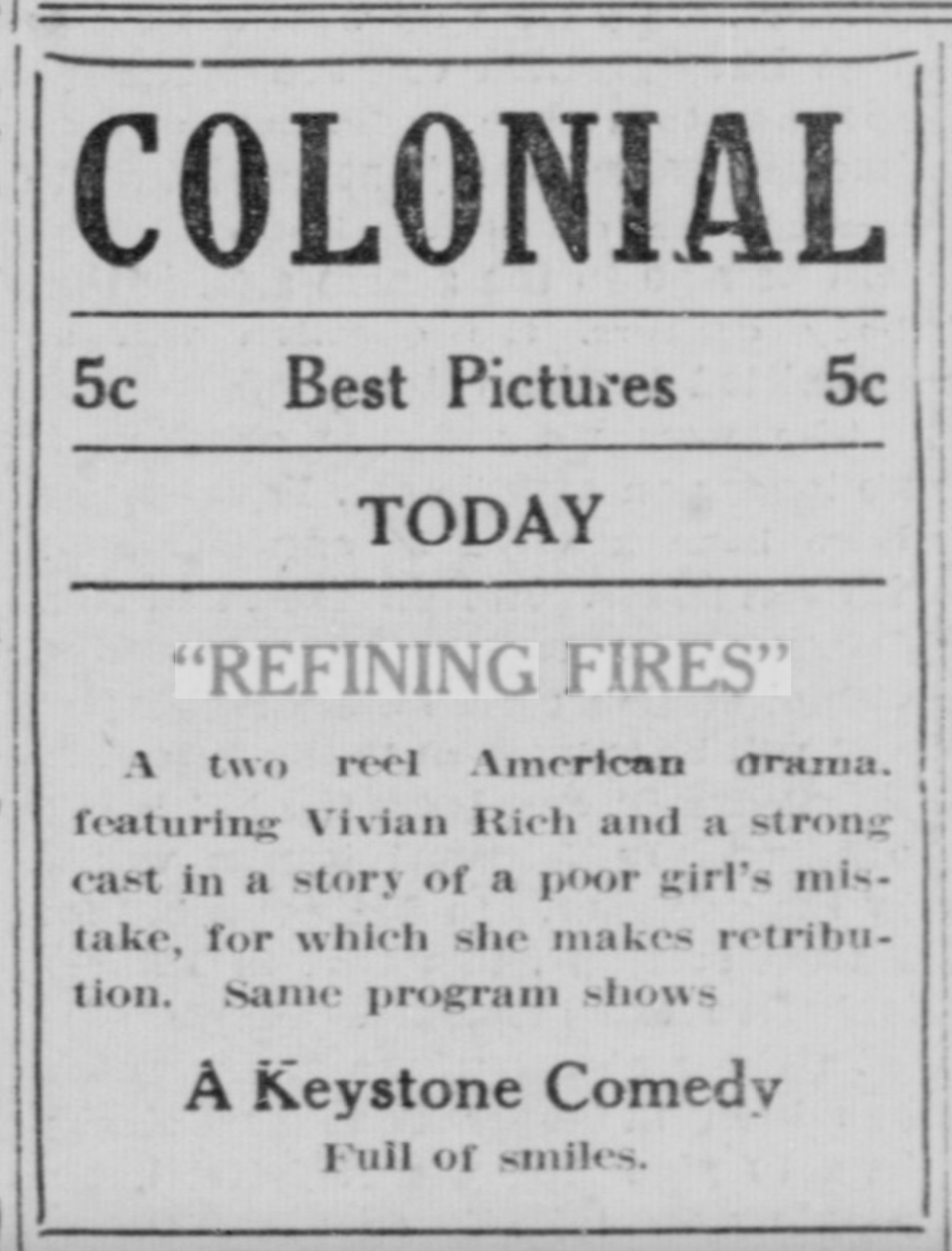
Refining Fires 1915 silent film Advertisement

A man named John Alstrom hopes to inherit money from his uncle falls in love with a woman (Mary) of lower socioeconomic status. Alstrom convinces the woman to live with him until he can collect his inheritance and marry her. He does not initially marry her for fear that he will lose out on his inheritance because the woman has no money. After a short time the woman decides that John Alstrom is acting different so she leaves him. Mary eventually finds employment with a man named Judge Stone and she is hired as a companion to the Judge's daughter (Nina). Eventually John Alstrom comes into his inheritance and Nina finds him and falls in love with him. The two plan to marry. Mary wants to tell Nina the truth about John but changes her mind at the last minute. Mary leaves and becomes a nun.

== Cast ==
- Harry Van Meter as John Alstrom
- Vivian Rich as Mary
- Jack Richardson as Judge Stone
- Charlotte Burton as Nina - the judge's daughter
- Louise Lester as Sister Superior
- Jean Durrell
- Mrs.Tom Ricketts (i.e. Josephine Ditt) as Florence

== Reception ==
On February 15, 1915 The South Bend News-Times summarized the film as a two reel feature in which "A girl makes a mistake and suffers the consequences, but the lesson taught is a good one. It is a plain subject well handled."
