= At Midnight (1913 film) =

- Directed by: Lorimer Johnston
- Written by: Gordon V. May (story)
- Starring: Harry Van Meter; Violet Neitz; Louise Lester; Jack Richardson; Vivian Rich
- Distributed by: Mutual Film
- Release date: November 22, 1913
- Running time: 1 reel
- Country: United States
- Languages: Silent film English intertitles

At Midnight is a 1913 American silent short film written by Gordon V. May starring Harry Van Meter, Violet Neitz, Louise Lester, Jack Richardson and Vivian Rich. In 2015, George Moore Films produced a feature-length remake of the film.
