= A Slice of Life (1914 film) =

- Directed by: Henry Otto
- Written by: Nellie Browne Duff
- Starring: Ed Coxen; Charlotte Burton; Winifred Greenwood
- Distributed by: Mutual Film
- Release date: November 9, 1914
- Country: United States
- Languages: Silent film English intertitles

A Slice of Life is a 1914 American silent short drama film directed by Henry Otto, starring Ed Coxen, Charlotte Burton, and Winifred Greenwood.

== Cast ==
- Ed Coxen as Jim
- Charlotte Burton as Jessie, Jim's wife
- Winifred Greenwood as Betty Moore
- Edith Borella as Betty's mother
- William Bertram as Long, City Editor
- George Field as Boyd Harte
- John Steppling as Tom, chief of police
- Perry Banks as Police Sergeant
- Albert Cavens
