= A Blowout at Santa Banana =

- Written by: Grant Wallace
- Starring: Sydney Ayres; Vivian Rich; Harry Van Meter
- Production company: American Film Manufacturing Company
- Distributed by: Mutual Film
- Release date: January 26, 1914
- Running time: 2 reels
- Country: United States
- Language: Silent with English intertitles

A Blowout at Santa Banana is a 1914 American silent comedy-drama short film starring Sydney Ayres, Vivian Rich, and Harry Van Meter. The film was shot in Santa Barbara by the American Film Manufacturing Company, aka Flying "A" Studios, and released by Mutual Film.

== Plot ==
Three guardsmen are asked to bring a ton of fireworks to Santa Banana for a big Fourth of July celebration. Overnight, they're intercepted by bandits and decide to set off all the fireworks in an attempt to escape their captors. When they arrive back home without the fireworks, they're forced to decide whether to face death by hanging or be married to three elderly women.

== Cast ==
- Sydney Ayres
- Vivian Rich
- Harry Van Meter
- Perry Banks
- Charlotte Burton
- Edith Borella
- Caroline Cooke
- Julius Frankenburg
- Jacques Jaccard
- Louise Lester
- Charles Morrison
- Violet Neitz
- Jack Richardson
- William Tedmarsh
