= The Redemption of a Pal =

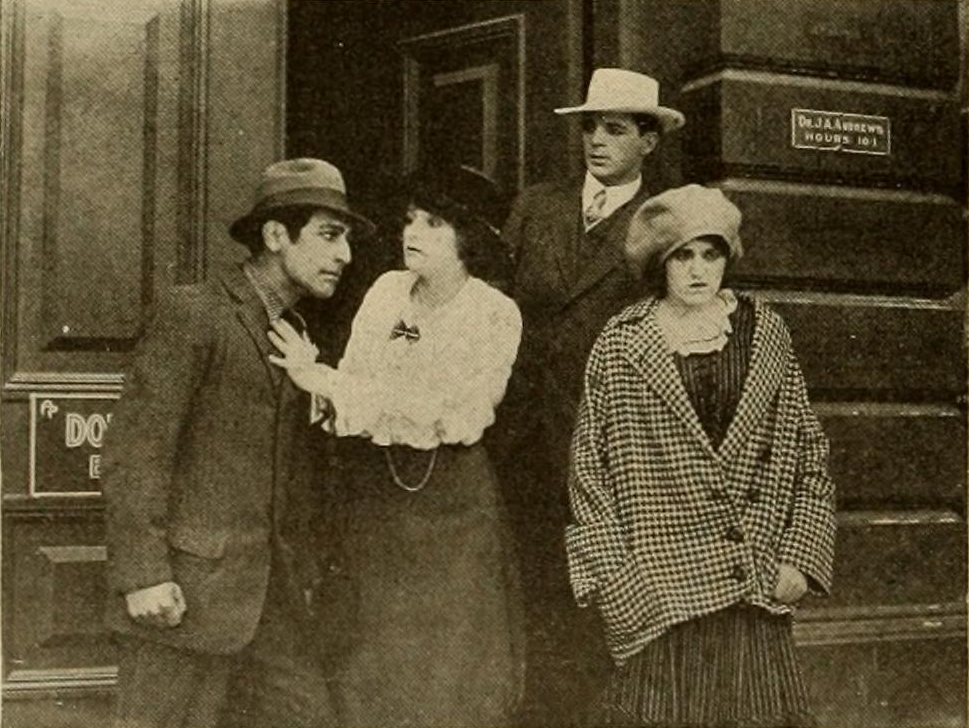
- Directed by: Henry Otto
- Starring: Edith Borella; Charlotte Burton; George Field; Winifred Greenwood; Edward Coxen
- Distributed by: Mutual Film
- Release date: September 21, 1914
- Running time: 2 reels
- Country: United States
- Languages: Silent; English intertitles

The Redemption of a Pal is a 1914 American silent drama short film directed by Henry Otto starring Edith Borella, Charlotte Burton, George Field, Winifred Greenwood and Edward Coxen.

== Plot ==
According to a film magazine, "Dora, a girl of the underworld, has never known other influence until she meets Lane, a young wealthy banker. Lane has a young sister whom he loves. One night she accompanies friends on a slumming expedition, and, in a spirit of bravado, she takes a few puffs from an opium pipe. She acquires the taste, which later develops into a craving for opium. Lane, one night accompanies a friend to a dance hall. Dora is present with some friends. A bully insults her and Lane knocks him down. Lane and Dora become acquainted. On Lane's refusal to buy some flowers from a poor old woman, Dora, on the impulse of the moment, gets up and dances and hands over the collection she gets to the woman. This generous act awakens in the soul of Lane a desire to uplift the denizens of the underworld. With the assistance of Dora, he starts a club in close proximity to the district and has installed a hospital, reading room, employment bureau, nursery, etc. Under a different environment. Dora realizes the shallow life she has been leading. Thrown in daily contact with Lane, she learns to love him, but one day in calling at his office, she sees Lane kiss his sister and, believing it to be his sweetheart, stiffled [sic] the love that had grown up in her heart. By her own changed life and influence she sets a good example for her pal, Andy, who reforms and becomes a man.

Later on the sister of Lane again visits the opium den. A fire breaks out in the old shack and the place is soon enveloped in flames. Dora and her pal run to watch the fire. A woman breaks through the flames and informs the crowd that another woman is still in the building. Andy rushes through smoke and fire, picks up the woman and carries her to safety. Dora has her conveyed to her little hospital that Lane founded. The next morning Lane reads of the fire and that the woman rescued was brought to his hospital and decides to visit it. Dora conducts him to the ward and Lane recognizes his sister. Dora leaves the two together and goes to where her pal Andy is. Andy is seated in a chair with his hands in bandages. When Dora comes in Andy greets her with a smile and asks her to become his wife. After a moment of hesitation she consents and when Lane finally enters the room she tells him the tidings. Lane congratulates them both and concealing his disappointment turns once again to the hospital and realizes that in his philanthropy he but cast his bread upon the waters."
