= George Field (actor) =

American actor (1877–1925)

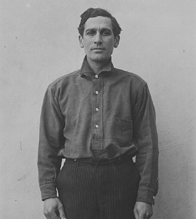
- Field, 1910s
- Born: March 18, 1877; San Francisco, California, U.S.
- Died: March 9, 1925 (aged 47); Los Angeles, California, U.S.
- Occupation: Actor
- Years active: 1912 – 1924
- Spouse: Winifred Greenwood

George Field (March 18, 1877 – March 9, 1925) was an American silent film actor.

== Early life ==
George Blankman Field was born to George Durgin Field and Elizabeth Blankman. Elizabeth was the daughter of dentist and attorney Dr. Henry Gerrit Blankman, born 3 May 1813 in Amsterdam, North Holland. He arrived in San Francisco from New York in June 1849. Elizabeth's mother was Magdelena del Valle, the niece and ward of the famous Mexican General Mariano de Vallejo and his brother Jose de Jesus de Vallejo.

== Career ==
George began his career as a stage actor in the popular San Francisco theatre scene but was signed into film in 1912 and had starred in 207 films by 1924. He received a glowing review as Mozart in Footprints of Mozart (1914).

He also had a bit part in "Don Q Son of Zorro," where he was credited as George Blankman. George and Winifred Greenwood worked at Flying A Studios in Santa Barbara. George later worked for Dustin Farnum, after whom Dustin Hoffman was named.

George also starred with Charlotte Burton in films such as In the Firelight.

== Personal life ==
He was married to his co-star Winifred L. Greenwood who herself starred in at least 222 films. They married in 1913 and were divorced circa 1918.

However, illness cut his career short and he was forced to leave acting in late 1924. He died at age 47 on March 9, 1925, after a battle with tuberculosis.

George's funeral notice appeared in The Los Angeles Times and stated that he was the beloved husband of Mary L. Field.

== Selected filmography ==
- In the Firelight (1913)
- The Shriner's Daughter (1913)
- The Flirt and the Bandit (1913)
- While There's Life (1913)
- When a Woman Waits (1914)
- In Tune (1914)
- The Beggar Child (1914)
- The Archeologist (1914)
- A Slice of Life (1914)
- The Final Impulse (1914)
- The Redemption of a Pal (1914)
- The Wrong Birds (1914)
- The Song of the Sea Shell (1914)
- This Is th' Life (1914)
- The Butterfly (1914)
- The Lure of the Sawdust (1914)
- Mein Lieber Katrina (1914)
- Footprints of Mozart (1914) <red name=Mozart />
- A Soul Astray (1914)
- Calamity Anne's Love Affair (1914)
- The Town of Nazareth (1914)
- Unto the Weak (1914)
- The Resolve (1915)
- The Diamond from the Sky (1915)
- Wife Wanted (1915)
- The Fate of the Dolphin (1916)
- Riddle Gawne (1918)
- The Light of Western Stars (1918)
- The Testing of Mildred Vane (1918)
- Inside the Lines (1918)
- The End of the Game (1919)
- The Tiger's Trail (1919)
- A White Man's Chance (1919)
- The Fighting Line (1919)
- The Gray Wolf's Ghost (1919)
- The Kid and the Cowboy (1919)
- A Sagebrush Hamlet (1919)
- The Moon Riders (1920)
- His Nose in the Book (1920)
- The Rattler's Hiss (1920)
- Held Up for the Makin's (1920)
- Hair Trigger Stuff (1920)
- The Prospector's Vengeance (1920)
- Diamonds Adrift (1921)
- Blood and Sand (1922)
- North of the Rio Grande (1922)
- Adam's Rib (1923)
- Trigger Fingers (1924)
