= Mein Lieber Katrina =

- Starring: Charlotte Burton; George Field; Ida Lewis; John Steppling
- Distributed by: Mutual Film
- Release date: June 5, 1914
- Country: United States
- Languages: Silent; English intertitles

Mein Lieber Katrina is a 1914 American silent comedy short starring Charlotte Burton, George Field, Ida Lewis and John Steppling.

== Cast ==
- George Field as Heine, restaurant proprietor
- John Steppling as Hicks, the village constable
- Ida Lewis as Katrina
- Charlotte Burton as The Dishwasher
