= The Song of the Sea Shell =

- Directed by: Henry Otto
- Starring: Edith Borella; Charlotte Burton; George Field; Edward Coxen
- Distributed by: Mutual Film
- Release date: August 28, 1914
- Country: United States
- Languages: Silent; English intertitles

The Song of the Sea Shell is a 1914 American silent drama short directed by Henry Otto, starring Edith Borella, Charlotte Burton, George Field, and Ed Coxen.
