= William Bertram (actor) =

Canadian-born actor, director, and producer (1880–1933)

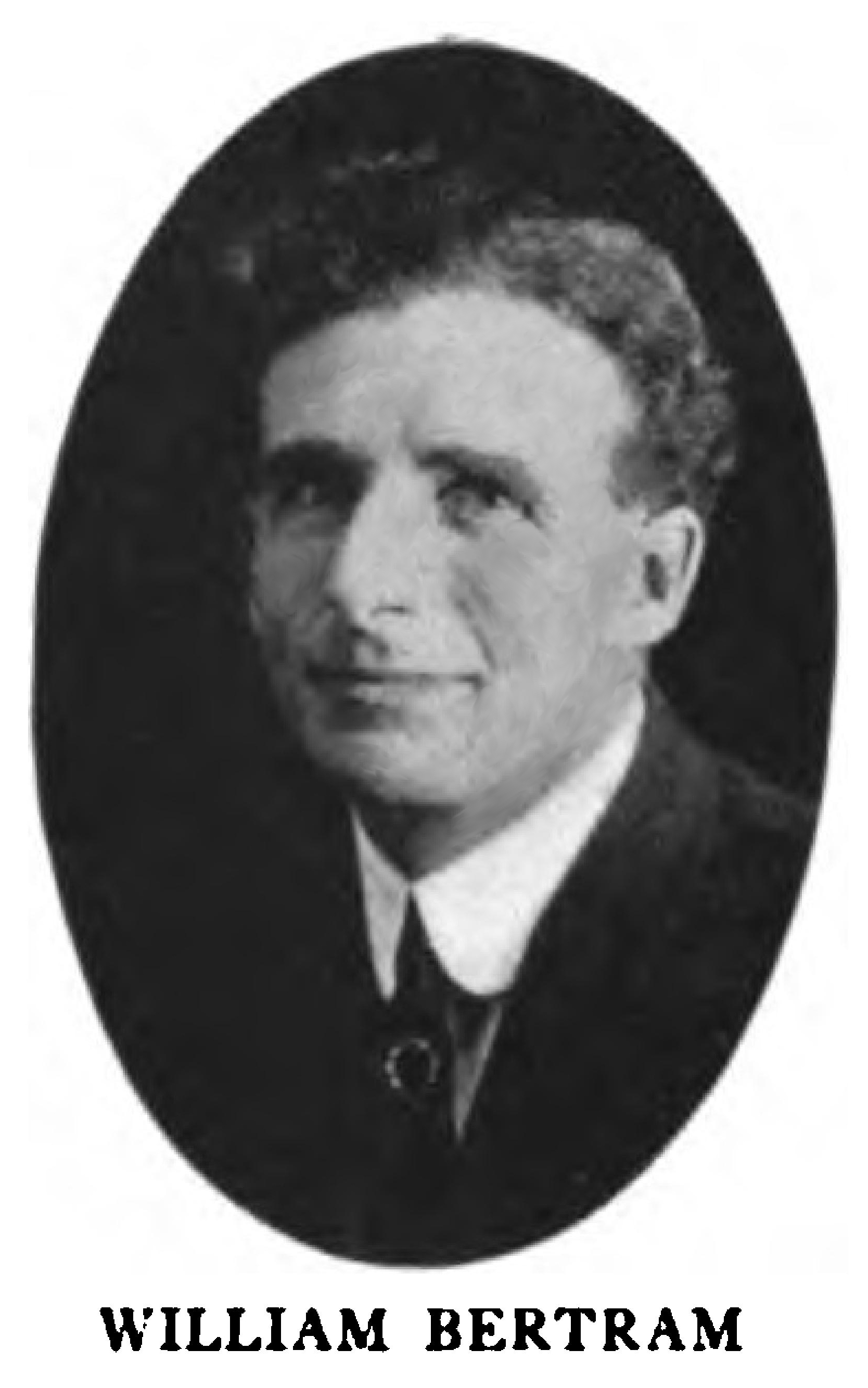
- Born: January 19, 1880; Walkerton, Ontario, Canada
- Died: May 1, 1933 (aged 53); Los Angeles, California, United States
- Occupations: Actor, film director, producer, stage singer
- Years active: 1912-1931

William Bertram (born William Benjamin Switzer, January 19, 1880 – May 1, 1933) was a Canadian-born actor, director, and producer of films in the United States, working predominantly during the silent era. He performed in 68 motion pictures between 1912 and 1931 and directed 64 films for various studios between 1915 and 1927. Bertram was also an accomplished singer in stage productions.

== Early life ==
Born in 1880 in Walkerton, Ontario, William Bertram was the oldest of seven children of Mary Porter (née Robinson) and Daniel J. Switzer, a blacksmith. After receiving his early public-school education in Canada, William immigrated with his parents and siblings to the United States in 1890, settling in Chelan, Washington. Later, he became interested in acting, so around 1900 he joined a stock company at the Auditorium Theater in Spokane while working as a hotel porter in the city under the name "W. T. Switzer".

== Stage and film career ==
In its January 29, 1916, issue, the trade magazine Motion Picture News provides a brief biography of Bertram in its semiannual "Studio Directory". With regard to Bertram's acting career, the magazine highlights his specialty for playing "Indian" (Native American) roles in films:

For a time [Bertram] was with Harry Bishop's Liberty and Majestic stock companies in San Francisco and Oakland and played with Melbourne, McDowell and Mrs. Leslie Carter. He sang basso parts for comic opera stock companies, and in 1914 was actor and director of his own company...Mr. Bertram did his first motion picture work for Pathé Western in Indian parts during the year of 1912. In 1913 he appeared in Imp subjects and later in Bison. He distinguished himself as a portrayer of Indian characters and became known as one of the greatest Indian actors in pictures.

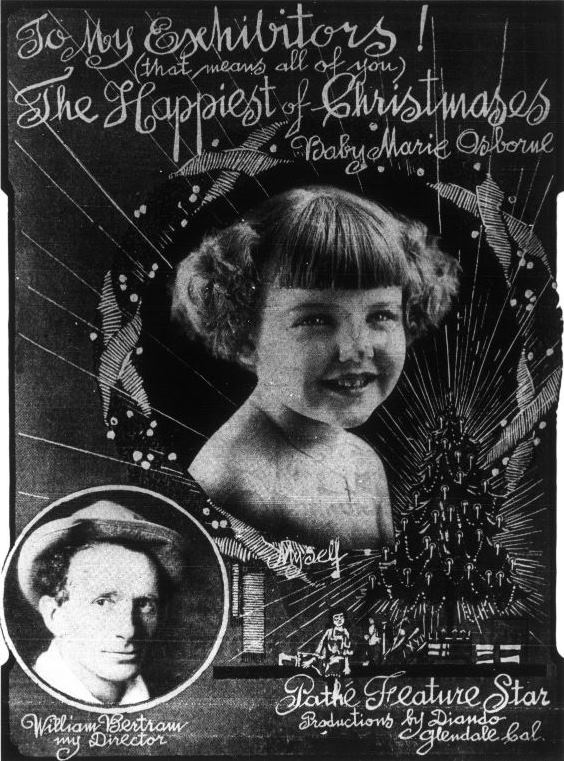
Inset of Bertram, "my Director", in Christmas greeting to theater owners from child star Baby Marie Osborne; featured in the trade paper Variety, December 28, 1917.

Among the many films that Bertram directed are a series of two-reel and five-reel comedies and dramas by "Babie Marie" Osborne, who by age five in 1916 had become a star in a series of shorts. Bertram directed 14 of her subsequent productions between September 1917 and November 1919, accounting for nearly half of Babie Marie’s motion pictures when she was a child. Those films directed by Bertram include Tears and Smiles (1917), The Little Patriot (1917), Daddy's Girl (1918), Dolly Does Her Bit (1918), A Dollar of the West (1918), The Voice of Destiny (1918), Cupid by Proxy (1918), Milady o' the Beanstalk (1918), Winning Grandma (1918), Dolly's Vacation (1918), The Sawdust Doll (1919), The Old Maid's Baby (1919), Baby Marie's Round-Up (1919), and Miss Gingersnap (1919)

After working extensively as a director between 1916 and 1919, Bertram returned to acting in films, although he continued to direct as well. He appears in the role of Sam Singer in the 1922 Universal Western The Long Chance and as Jack Barton in another Western in 1924, The Smoking Trail. By the end of 1927, however, Bertram’s career as a director had effectively ended; but he periodically acted in films until 1931, just two years before his death. Roles in additional Westerns, such as The Riding Kid, Trails of the Golden West, The Mystery Trooper, and Lightnin' Smith's Return are among his final performances.

== Personal life and death ==
According to information recorded in the 1930 federal census, William Bertram married in 1920; and by 1930 he and his wife Jean, who was a native of New York, were living in a rented residence at 1634 Argyle Avenue in Hollywood. William was still acting in occasional films at that time. He, for example, portrayed the character "Indian Joe" in Spurs, a Western that was completed just a few months after the noted census was taken.

On May 1, 1933, William Bertram died at the Olive View Sanitarium in Los Angeles, California, following "two years' illness". The widely read trade weekly Variety announced Bertram’s passing eight days after his death and noted in his obituary, "A resident of Southern California for 43 years, Bertram became identified with pictures in their infancy as a director for Vitagraph, Keystone and others." Variety also reported that Bertram was survived by his wife, mother, and five brothers.

== Selected filmography ==
In addition to the series of "Babie Marie" films that Bertram directed between 1917 and 1919, the following constitute a small sampling of other productions in which he served as either a cast member or director:

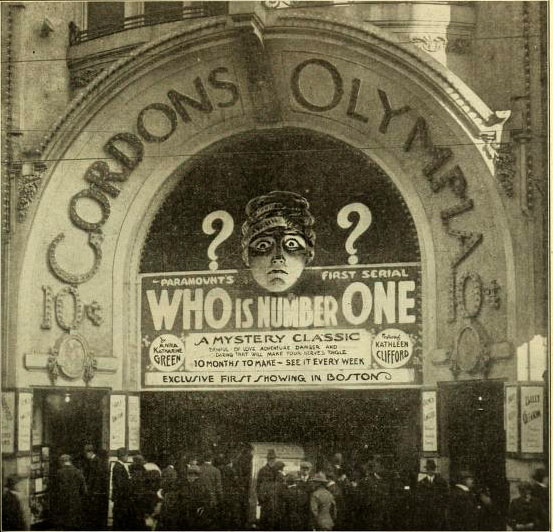
Who Is Number One?, Paramount's first serial; marquee in Boston, 1917.

- Hearts in Conflict (1912)
- In the Firelight (1913)
- The Shriner's Daughter (1913)
- When a Woman Waits (1914)
- A Slice of Life (1914)
- The Final Impulse (1914)
- Damaged Goods (1914)
- Footprints of Mozart (1914)
- A Soul Astray (1914)
- A Happy Coersion (1914)
- The Town of Nazareth (1914)
- Unto the Weak (1914)
- His Obligation (1915)
- Wife Wanted (1915)
- The Idol (1915)
- Neal of the Navy (1915)
- Water Stuff (1916)
- The Neglected Wife (1917)
- Who Is Number One? (1917)
- The Little Patriot (1917)
- The Voice of Destiny (1918)
- The Wolverine (1921)
- The Long Chance (1922)
- The Purple Riders (1922)
- Ace of Action (1926)
- Twisted Triggers (1926)
- Under Fire (1926)
- Gold from Weepah (1927)
- Tangled Herds (1927)
- The Phantom Buster (1927)
- The Swift Shadow (1927)
- The Boss of Rustler's Roost (1928)
- The Little Shepherd of Kingdom Come (1928)
- Spurs (1930)
- Lightnin' Smith Returns (1931)
- The Riding Kid (1931)
- Trails of the Golden West (1931)
