= Violet Knights =

American actress

- Born: Violet May Neitz; May 15, 1894; Anacortes, Washington, United States
- Died: June 13, 1973 (aged 79); Newport Beach, California, United States
- Occupation: Actress

Violet Knights (born Violet May Neitz; 15 May 1894 – 13 June 1973) was an American silent film actress.

Knights was born in Anacortes, Washington. She was signed in 1913 and starred in about 10 films between 1913 and 1914. She left acting and married and concentrated on raising a family becoming Violet MacKaye. She returned to acting 16 years later in The Cheyenne Kid in 1930 but her several minor roles following that were uncredited. She died in Newport Beach, aged 79.

== Filmography ==
- Stage Frights (1935)
- Carnival (1935) (uncredited) .... Small Town Woman
- Square Shooter (1935) (uncredited) .... Emma (waitress)
- Wheels of Destiny (1934) (uncredited) (as Violet Mackaye) .... Settler
- Ann Vickers (1933) (uncredited) .... Prisoner
- The Phantom (1931) .... Lucy (the maid)
- The Cheyenne Kid (1930) (as Violet McKay) .... Madge

... aka The Fighting Test (UK)

- The Last Supper (1914) (as Violet Neitz)
- Retribution (1914) (as Violet Neitz)
- The Carbon Copy (1914) (as Violet Neitz)
- The Sacrifice (1914) (as Violet Neitz)
- The Cricket on the Hearth (1914) (as Violet Neitz)
- A Blowout at Santa Banana (1914) (as Violet Neitz)
- The Return of Helen Redmond (1914) (as Violet Neitz)
- The Shriner's Daughter (1913) (as Violet Neitz)
- Trapped in a Forest Fire (1913) (as Violet Neitz)
- The Occult (1913) (as Violet Neitz)
- At Midnight (as Violet Neitz)
- Calamity Anne, Heroine (1913) (as Violet Neitz)
