= This Is th' Life =

- Directed by: Henry Otto
- Written by: Theodosia Harris (story)
- Starring: Charlotte Burton; George Field; Ed Coxen; Edith Borella; John Steppling
- Distributed by: Mutual Film
- Release date: August 24, 1914
- Country: United States
- Languages: Silent; English intertitles

This Is th' Life is a 1914 American silent short film directed by Henry Otto starring Charlotte Burton, George Field, Ed Coxen, Edith Borella, and John Steppling.

The two-reel film previously was titled Converting Dad before being renamed to This Is th' Life before its August 24, 1914, release.

== Reception ==
Motography published a positive review of the film, "Charlotte Burton, in the leading feminine role, that of a country girl, is delightfully natural in her acting, while Ed Coxen take the male lead in equally charming manner. George Fields completely loses his personality in the role of a hard-headed old farmer, who considers all modern improvements a waste of time, and the character portrayal further proves this actor's versatility. A number of the "Flying A" favorites appear in the supporting roles, all doing good work in their respective parts."

The trade publication Electrical Merchandise and Selling Electricity said the film was a good advertisement for electricity, writing, "There is a real story in the pictures, in which electric pumping for irrigation, electric utensils for reducing drudgery, electric therapeutics for alleviating suffering and electric table-ware are successfully shown. A real plot is developed in which a full cast of characters, including villain and comedian, play their allotted parts. The climax being a wedding-breakfast for two at which the heroine offers the hero four electrically soft-boiled eggs. Verily, this is th' life."
