= Einar Andersson =

Swedish opera singer

Einar Andersson (born Ernst Ejnar Andersson 13 July 1909 – 11 January 1989) was a Swedish tenor opera singer.

Andersson was born in Västerås. He studied at the Royal Swedish Academy of Music in Stockholm. He first performed on stage in an opera in Stockholm in 1938. In 1939 Anderson became a soloist in the Royal Swedish Opera. In 1958 he toured the Soviet Union.

He died on 11 January 1989 in Åseda in Uppvidinge.

== Filmography ==
- Hemtrevnad i kasern (Cosiness In Barracks) (1941)
- Eldfågeln (The Firebird — film of the ballet) (1952)
