= Marc Edmund Jones =

American astrologer

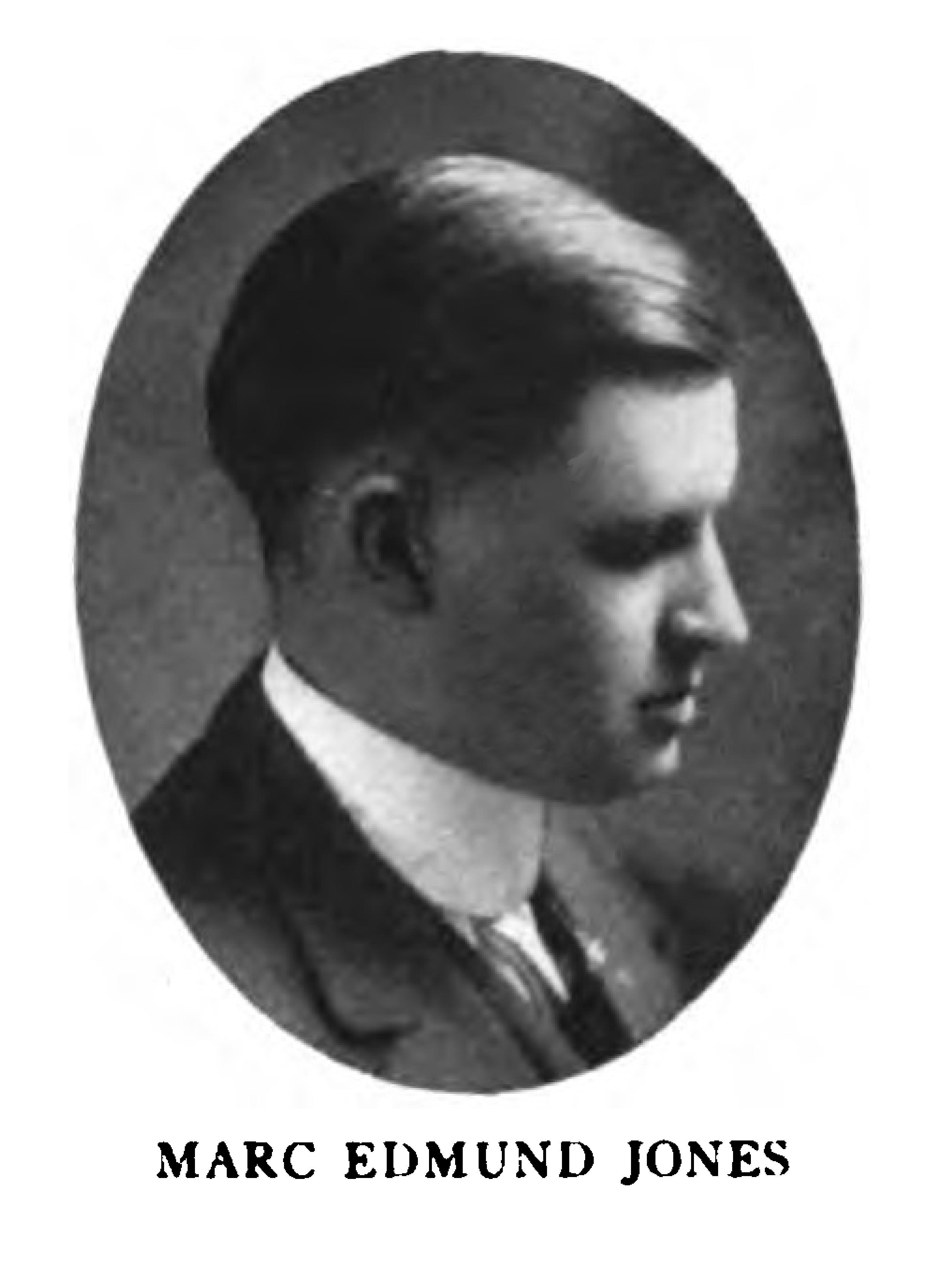
- Born: October 1, 1888; St. Louis
- Died: March 5, 1980 (aged 91); Stanwood, Washington
- Occupations: Writer screenwriter astrologer
- Spouse: Priscilla Kennedy Chandler Jones (m. 1926; died 1976)

Dr. Marc Edmund Jones (October 1, 1888 – March 5, 1980) was an American writer, screenwriter and astrologer.

== Early life ==
Born October 1, 1888, at 8:37 a.m. CST in St. Louis, Missouri, Marc Edmund Jones showed an early fascination with complex patterns in the environment, which later influenced his development of a distinctive philosophical system. His evolving ideas would contribute to notable perspectives on occultism and the Kabbalistic worldview.

He was raised in Chicago within the formal, late Victorian parental framework of the time. His early influences included Christian Science neighbors who moved in next door and an aunt who introduced him to Theosophy. His lifelong interest in astrology began in 1913, leading him to explore occult principles more deeply. Over time, he also developed an interest in spiritualism.

== Work ==
Marc Jones has been called the dean of American astrology, and is perhaps best remembered as the leader in the twentieth century of a movement to reformulate the study of astrology.

He developed the seven categories of horoscopic patterns or distributions of the astrological planets around the zodiac, which are called the Splay, Splash, Bundle, Bowl, Locomotive, Bucket, and Seesaw shapes or patterns.

He created the Sabian Symbols with the assistance of the clairvoyant Elsie Wheeler in 1925, and in 1953 he published The Sabian Symbols in Astrology, a book that renders a specific symbol and interpretive character for each of the 360 degrees of the zodiac that are found on the astronomical ecliptic.

Early in life he became a writer of silent film scenarios, and worked in that profession for a number of years. In 1923, he founded the special-studies group known as the Sabian Assembly, still in existence in the twenty-first century. He was ordained as a Presbyterian minister in 1934, and later received a PhD degree from Columbia University. He taught and lectured across the USA for years.

His most voluminous written work is the set of Sabian lessons on philosophy, the Bible, astrology and cabalistic pattern, at which he labored for decades.

Dr. Jones died on March 5, 1980 in Stanwood, Washington. His major visible legacy exists today in the Sabian Assembly which he founded and his books, most which are still in print.

== Published works ==
- How To Learn Astrology
- The Guide To Horoscope Interpretation
- Horary Astrology
- Astrology: How & Why It Works
- The Sabian Symbols In Astrology
- Essentials Of Astrological Analysis
- Scope Of Astrological Prediction
- Mundane Perspectives In Astrology
- Fundamentals Of Number Significance
- The Counseling Manual In Astrology
- How To Live With The Stars
- The Marc Edmund Jones 500
- George Sylvester Morris: Philosophical Career & Theistic Idealism
- Gandhi Lives
- Occult Philosophy
- The Sabian Manual: A Ritual For Living
- The Sabian Book Of Letters To Aspirants
- Man, Magic And Fantasy
- "Ten Words Of Power"
- "Patterns Of Consciousness: The Ibn Gabirol Squares"
