= Julia Arthur =

Canadian actress (1869–1959)

- Julia Arthur, 1897
- Born: Ida Lewis; May 3, 1869; Hamilton, Ontario, Canada
- Died: March 28, 1950 (aged 80); Boston, Massachusetts, US
- Occupation: Actress
- Spouse: Benjamin Pierce Cheney Jr. (m. 1898)

Julia Arthur (May 3, 1869 – March 28, 1950) (Note: Although 1868 is accepted as the year of her birth, both The National Cyclopaedia of National Biography and Who Was Who in America give 1869 as the year.) was a Canadian-born stage and film actress.

== Early life ==
Born Ida Lewis in Hamilton, Ontario, May 3, 1869, she was the daughter of Thomas J. Lewis, a tobacco manufacturer, and Elizabeth (Arthur) Lewis. She was the eldest of nine siblings. Her younger sister, Eleanor Letitia Lewis, became an actress known by the stage name, "Eleanor Dorel".

Ida Lewis began acting at the age of 11, in 1879, when she played the part of Gamora in The Honeymoon in some amateur theatricals in her own home. She displayed such remarkable ability for her age that a brilliant future for her was predicted. She made her first professional appearance in 1880 with the Daniel E. Bandmann repertoire company as the Prince of Wales in Richard III, and thenceforth she was before the public as Julia Arthur, using the first name of Julia and her mother's maiden name. Her first New York success was at the Union Square Theatre in The Black Masque a stage adaptation of Edgar Allen Poe's Masque of the Red Death by Frederick Giles.

At the age of 12, in 1881, she became the leading woman, playing Ophelia, Juliet, Portia, Lady Macbeth, Lady Anne in Richard III, and other important roles, and remained with the Bandmann company until 1884. A year of study in Germany followed. Upon her return in 1885 she joined a repertoire company in California, playing the leading female roles in a number of modern plays, among them the Galley Slave, Called Back, Two Orphans, Woman Against Woman, Captain Swift, Colleen Bawn, Arrah-na-Pogue, Jim the Penman, The Silver King, Uncle Tom's Cabin, The Still Alarm, Peril, Divorce, and The Private Secretary.

She made her debut in London in February 1895, with Sir Henry Irving's Company, as Rosamond in Tennyson's Becket. Subsequently she toured with Sir Henry Irving's Company in the United States. She performed in Frances Hodgson Burnett's play A Lady of Quality.

== Mature career ==
In February 1892 she gained her first real success at the Union Square Theatre in New York in the role of the Queen in The Black Masque. This performance made her famous, and from the opening night her services were in great demand. A few weeks later she became leading woman in A.M. Palmer's stock company, then considered the leading one in America. With it she played Jeanne in the Broken Seal; Letty Fletcher in Saints and Sinners; and Lady Windermere in Lady Windermere's Fan – her Broadway debut, on February 5, 1893; but her greatest triumph was in Mercedes, a short play by Thomas Bailey Aldrich. She made such an impression that the author presented her with the full rights to the play. Arthur made her second appearance on Broadway in Sister Mary, which ran from May 15 to 29, 1894. Later that year she went to England, where she made her London debut on February 1, 1895, as leading woman, next to Ellen Terry, in Sir Henry Irving's Lyceum Theatre. She played Elaine in King Arthur; Sophia in Olivia; Queen Anne in Richard III; Rosamond in Becket; and Imogene in Cymbeline, the last said to be her greatest role.

She returned to America in 1896 with the Irving-Terry company, and was so heartily received that she decided to appear the following season with her own company. On October 14, 1897, she presented a dramatization of Mrs Burnett's novel, A Lady of Quality, herself taking the role of Clorinda Wildairs, and fully justifying her right to appear as a star. The play had its Broadway opening on November 1, 1897.

Napier Lothian Jr. served as Arthur's talent manager.

== Marriage ==
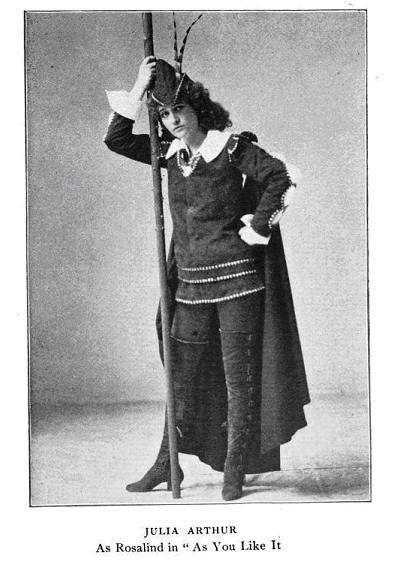
Famous Actresses of the Day in America by Lewis Clinton Strang pub. 1899

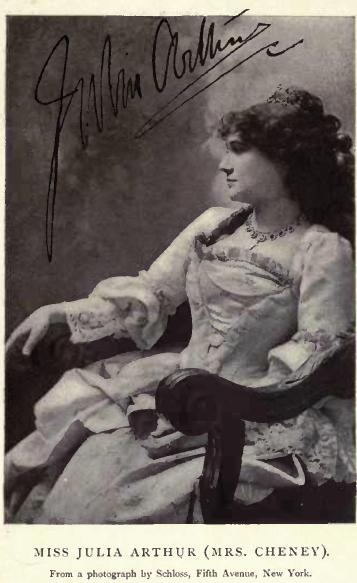
Mrs Julia Cheney née Ida Lewis

At Covington, Kentucky, on February 23, 1898, Julia Arthur (née Ida Lewis) married Benjamin Pierce Cheney Jr., only son of the wealthy Boston expressman, whose country estate is now the Elm Bank Horticulture Center. They made their home in Boston, with a summer estate on Calf Island. They were patrons of the Museum of Fine Arts in Boston, donating a number of antiquities. The couple produced no children.

On October 3, 1898, she appeared for the first time as Parthenia in her own production of Ingomar, repeating the successes of the previous year. On November 28, 1898, she produced As You Like It at Wallack's in New York City, and her performance of the part of Rosalind was conceded to be one of the best known to the American stage.

Arthur returned to Broadway on October 24, 1899, in Émile Bergerat's More than Queen, which continued through November 1899.

== Early cinema ==
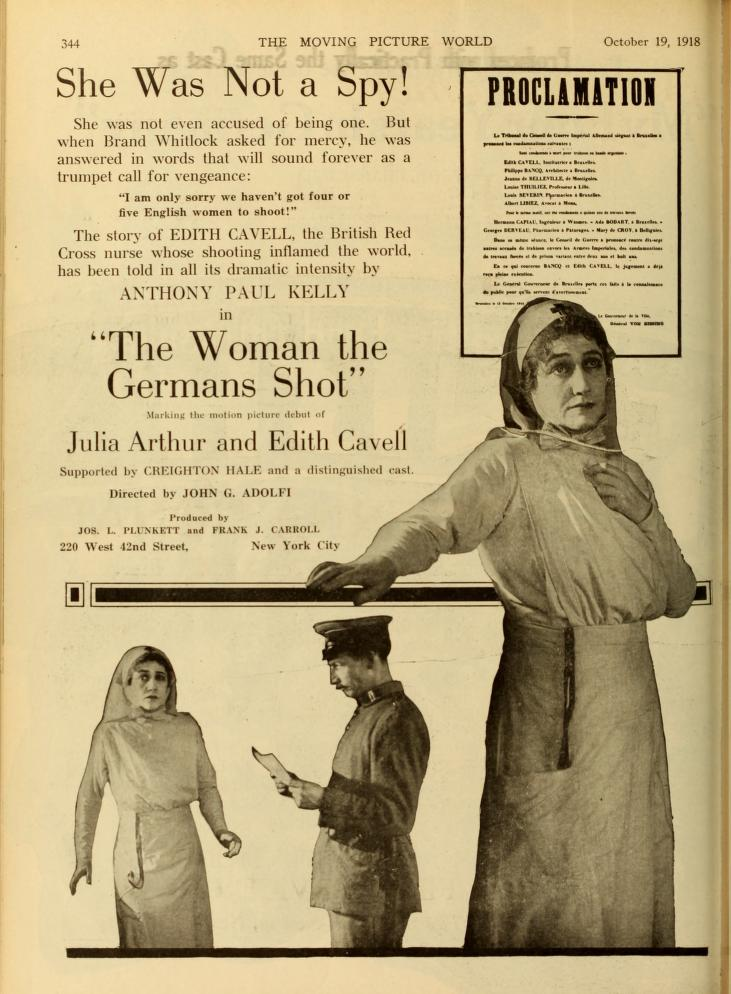
Advertisement for The Woman the Germans Shot (1918)

With her growing success on stage in America, Julia Arthur was offered a chance to perform in the fledgling motion picture industry. She appeared in her first silent film – Barbara Frietchie: The Story of a Patriotic American Woman – in 1908 with Vitagraph Studios under director J. Stuart Blackton. Of the ten films in which she performed, almost all were with Blackton. In 1918 John G. Adolfi directed The Woman the Germans Shot, starring Julia Arthur as Edith Cavell. Her last screen performance was in 1919 in The Common Cause, a benefit film to aid victims of World War I. It was produced by the "Stage Women's War Relief Fund," a charitable organization created by theatre workers with the American Theatre Wing as part of the Federal Council of Allied War Charities.

Arthur returned to Broadway in The Eternal Magdalene, which opened on November 1, 1915, and continued to January 1916. She was director and producer as well as star of Seremonda, which ran on Broadway from January 1, 1917, to March 1917. On May 17, 1918, she revived Out There on Broadway, continuing through the end of the month.

== Later life ==
Julia Arthur said her farewell to Broadway in Macbeth, in which she played Lady Macbeth opposite Lionel Barrymore. The play opened on February 17, 1921, and continued into March. It was later reported that she had come out of retirement because of her husband's financial reverses.

The Cheneys lived in relative ease and comfort, though after 1929 in somewhat reduced circumstances owing to financial reverses. Benjamin P. Cheney Jr., died near Kingman, Arizona, on June 10, 1942 – ironically, alongside the tracks of the Atchison, Topeka & Santa Fe Railroad, of which he had once been a director. Julia Arthur Cheney died in Boston on March 28, 1950.

== Filmography ==
- Barbara Fritchie: The Story of a Patriotic American Woman (1908)
- Ruy Blas (1909)
- King Lear (1909)
- The Life of Napoleon (1909)
- Napoleon, the Man of Destiny (1909)
- The Life of Moses (1909)
- Uncle Tom's Cabin (1910)
- The Woman the Germans Shot (1918)
- His Woman (1919)
- The Common Cause (1919)
