= Edward Coxen =

American actor (1880–1954)

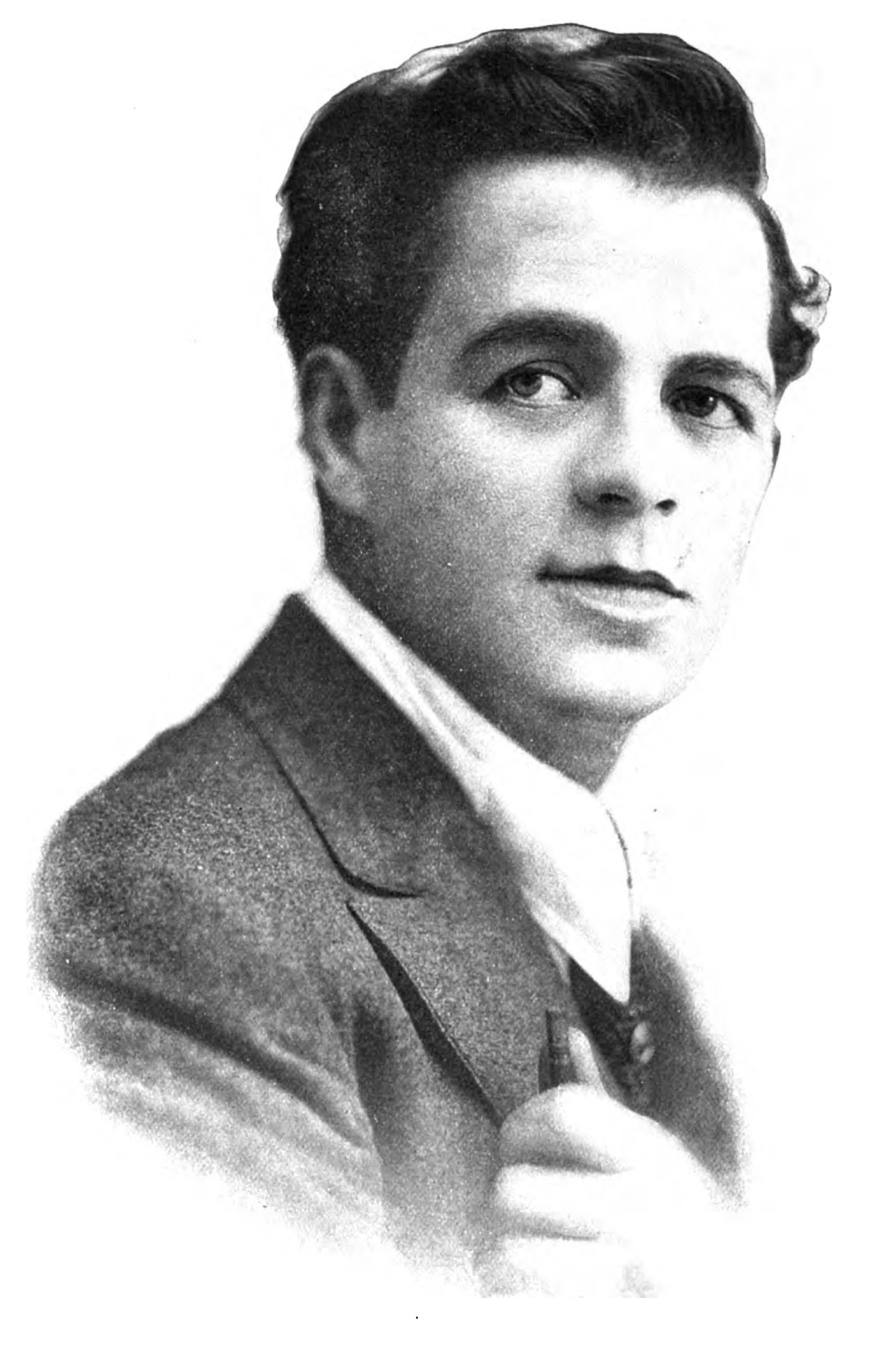
- Coxen in 1916
- Born: Albert Edward Coxen; 8 August 1880; Southwark, London, England
- Died: 21 November 1954 (aged 74); Hollywood, California, U.S.
- Occupation: Actor
- Years active: 1911–1941
- Spouse: Edith Borella (1914 – ?)

Albert Edward Coxen (8 August 1880 – 21 November 1954) was an English-born American actor. He appeared in over 200 films during his career.

== Personal life ==
Coxen was born in London, England. He came to the United States as a child and lived much of his life in San Francisco.

On 31 March 1884 whilst settled in San Francisco, Sarah Coxen gave birth to Ed Coxen's only sibling, a sister, Rosa A Coxen. On 14 October 1914, at the age of 33, he married Edith Victoria Borella in Los Angeles, a 24-year-old film actress born in Switzerland of Swiss parents. Borella, who also used the screen names of Eda, Ada and Aida, had played minor parts alongside Coxen in films such as Restitution, where Winifred Greenwood played his love interest. Edith Borella Coxen died in Los Angeles on 6 March 1974

After studying engineering, Coxen became a prospector before he eventually became an actor.

== Career ==
Coxen's acting career began in 1906 at the Majestic Theatre in San Francisco. He continued to perform with stock companies until he began working in films. He appeared in more than 290 films, beginning in 1912 and ending in 1943 with Air Raid Wardens. Much of his work was in melodramas and Westerns. While he had numerous leading roles during the 1910s, he had become confined to supporting roles or even uncredited bit parts in his later career.

== Death ==
On 21 November 1954, Coxen died at his longtime home, 464 N Manhattan Place, Los Angeles. He was buried at Forest Lawn Memorial Park in Glendale, California. This brief obituary for Albert Edward Coxen appeared shortly after his interment: 'Mr Coxen started his career at San Francisco and worked in both silent and talking motion pictures. He played with Rudolf Valentino, Ruth Roland and William S Hart. He leaves his widow Mrs Edith Victoria Coxen and a sister Mrs Rosa A Corder'.

== Selected filmography ==
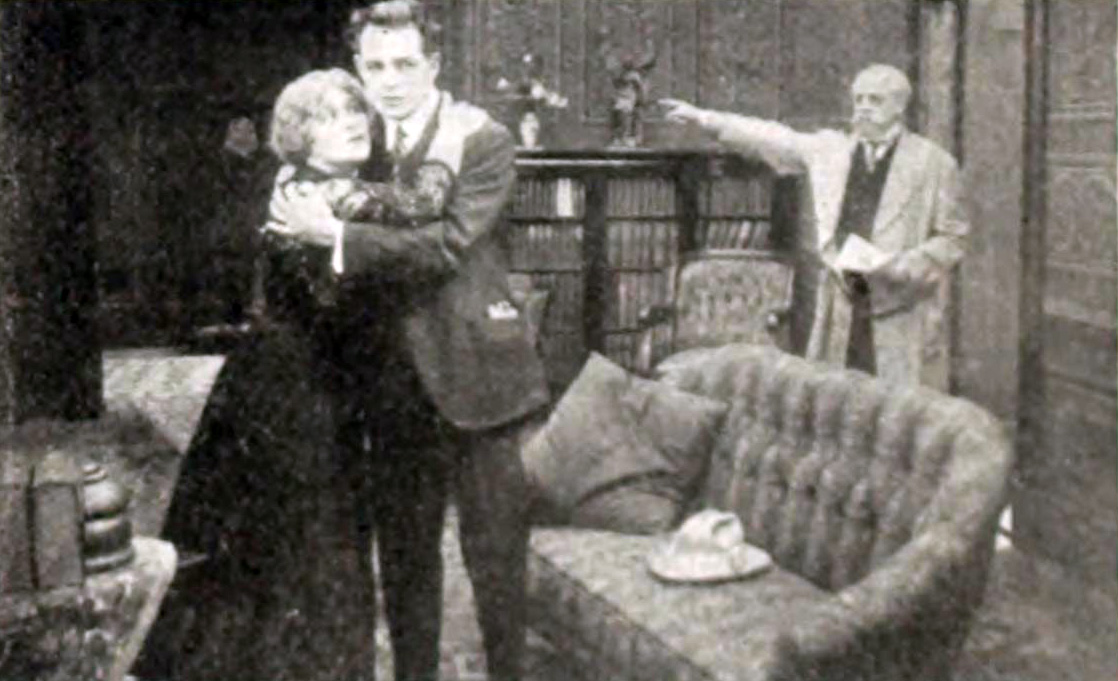
Repaid (1916)

- Mesquite's Gratitude (1911)
- He Who Laughs Last (1911)
- The Girl Bandits' Hoodoo (1912)
- A Hospital Hoax (1912)
- The Pony Express Girl (1912)
- A Rose of Old Mexico (1913)
- The Shriner's Daughter (1913)
- The Power of Light (1914)
- A Soul Astray (1914)
- The Lure of the Sawdust (1914)
- The Butterfly (1914)
- This Is th' Life (1914)
- The Song of the Sea Shell (1914)
- The Wrong Birds (1914)
- The Redemption of a Pal (1914)
- A Slice of Life (1914)
- Spider Barlow Cuts In (1915)
- The Water Carrier of San Juan (1915)
- Spider Barlow Meets Competition (1916)
- The Dreamer (1916)
- A Modern Sphinx (1916)
- Beware of Strangers (1917)
- Who Shall Take My Life? (1917)
- The Bearded Fisherman (1917)
- The Curse of Eve (1917)
- Madam Who? (1918)
- Carmen of the Klondike (1918)
- A Man's Man (1918)
- A Law Unto Herself (1918)
- Within the Cup (1918)
- Go West, Young Man (1918)
- Blindfolded (1918)
- The Bells (1918)
- Quicksand (1918)
- Desert Gold (1919)
- More Deadly Than The Male (1919)
- In Old Kentucky (1919)
- The Amazing Woman (1920)
- Witch's Gold (1920)
- Honor Bound (1920)
- The Path She Chose (1920)
- No Man's Woman (1921)
- Desperate Trails (1921)
- The Veiled Woman (1922)
- The Stranger of the Hills (1922)
- The Flying Dutchman (1923)
- Temporary Marriage (1923)
- A Man's Man (1923)
- One Glorious Night (1924)
- Flashing Spurs (1924)
- The Man Without a Country (1925)
- Cold Nerve (1925)
- Return of Grey Wolf (1926)
- The Test of Donald Norton (1926)
- The Man in the Shadow (1926)
- God's Great Wilderness (1927)
- Galloping Glory (1927)
- Galloping Fury (1927)
- The Spoilers (1930)
- Young Blood (Uncredited, 1932)
- The Fighting Champ (Uncredited, 1932)
- The Trail Drive (Uncredited, 1933)
- Gun Justice (Uncredited, 1933)
- Wheels of Destiny (1934)
- Smoking Guns (1934)
- Five Bad Men (1935)
- The Ghost Rider (1935)
- Westward Ho (Uncredited, 1935)
- Code of the Range (1936)
- The Sunday Round-Up (Uncredited, 1936)
- Riders of the Dawn (Uncredited, 1937)
- Thunder Trail (Uncredited, 1937)
- West of Rainbow's End (1938)
- South of Arizona (1938)
- Texas Stampede (1939)
- Down the Wyoming Trail (1939)
- Pioneers of the Frontier (1940)
- One Million B.C. (1940)
- Across the Sierras (Uncredited, 1941)
- King of Dodge City (Uncredited, 1941)
