= The Torch Bearer =

1916 film by Jack Prescott, William Russell

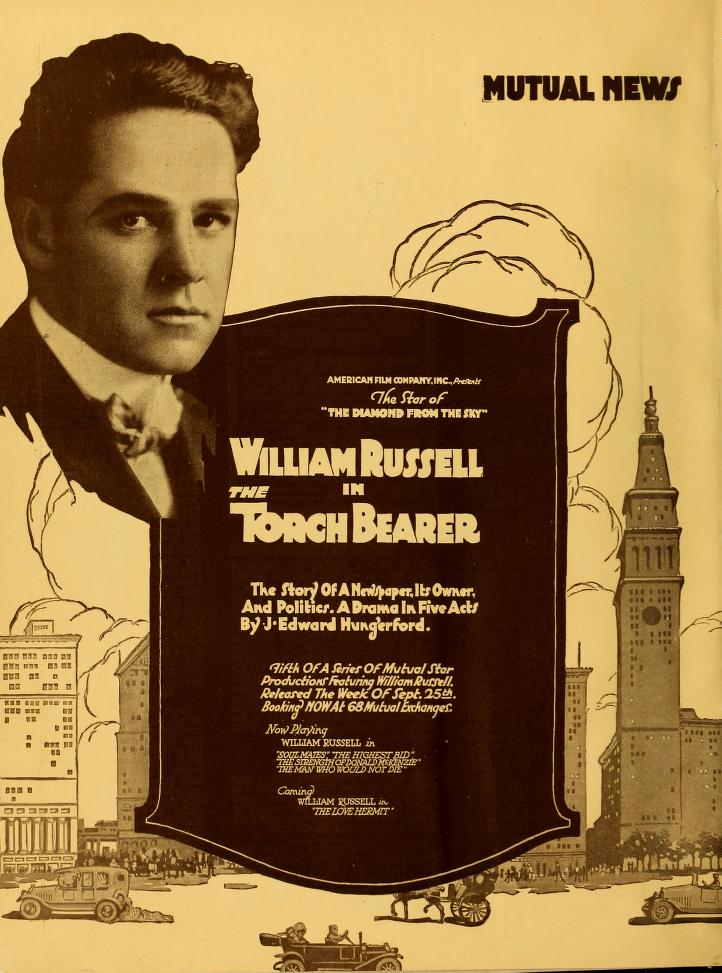
- Directed by: Jack Prescott; William Russell
- Written by: Arthur Henry Gooden (story); J. Edward Hungerford (adaptation)
- Starring: Charlotte Burton
- Cinematography: John W. Brown
- Distributed by: Mutual Film
- Release date: September 25, 1916
- Running time: 5 reels
- Country: United States
- Languages: Silent film English intertitles

The Torch Bearer is a 1916 American silent drama film directed by William Russell and Jack Prescott. The film stars Charlotte Burton.

== Plot ==
This summary was published in The Moving Picture World for September 30, 1916:

In "The Torch Bearer," a five-reel drama, William Russell appears as the owner of a metropolitan newspaper who has set out to clean up his city. He seeks to rout the crooks and grafters who control politics. Of course the "gang" threatens to "get him." He swears in his whole staff as special police and goes on with his fight. Janet Dare, a Western girl, who comes to live at the newspaper man's home, plays no small part in the stirring tale. How she falls into the clutches of the politicians and is later rescued — how the grafters are finally caught in their own trap, and how the reform candidate finally wins the election form a story that will hold any audience spellbound. This is the fifth of the William Russell Mutual Star Productions made by the American Film Co., Inc. All five are now ready for booking.

The American Film Institute published this synopsis:

Millionaire John Huntley-Knox, the owner of the Boston Star, fights political corruption with the aid of William Wendell, the reform district attorney. One day John receives word that he will be visited by Janet Dare, the daughter of a man who once saved John's father's life. John's mother, apprehensive about the "Western" girl's visit, writes a friend about it, but her letter gets crossed with one extending an invitation to Janet. Although she is Eastern bred, Janet decides to play the part of a wild Westerner. Despite her tricks, she and John fall in love. One night, while looking through some papers, John learns that Janet is heiress to a large fortune. He also discovers a confession signed by a man who committed a murder of which John's father was accused. When the gang that is trying to ruin John attempts to kidnap his sister Henrietta but gets Janet instead, John and a group of boy scouts come to her aid. They discover, however, that Janet has held her own against her captors with a gun. All ends well when Janet is freed, John wins an important city election, and Wendell, who loves Henrietta, discovers that she feels the same way. Heiresses. Kidnapping. Millionaires. The West. Boy Scouts. Confession (law). District attorneys. Elections. False accusations. Firearms. Gangs. Letters. Newspapers. Political corruption. Reformers.

== Cast ==
- Charlotte Burton as Janet Dare
- Harry Keenan as William Wendell
- Marie Van Tassell as Mrs. Huntley-Knox
- William Russell as John Huntley-Knox
- Alan Forrest
- Margaret Nichols
- Rena Carlton
- Nate Watt
