= The Man Who Would Not Die (film) =

1916 film by William Russell, Nate Watt, Jack Prescott

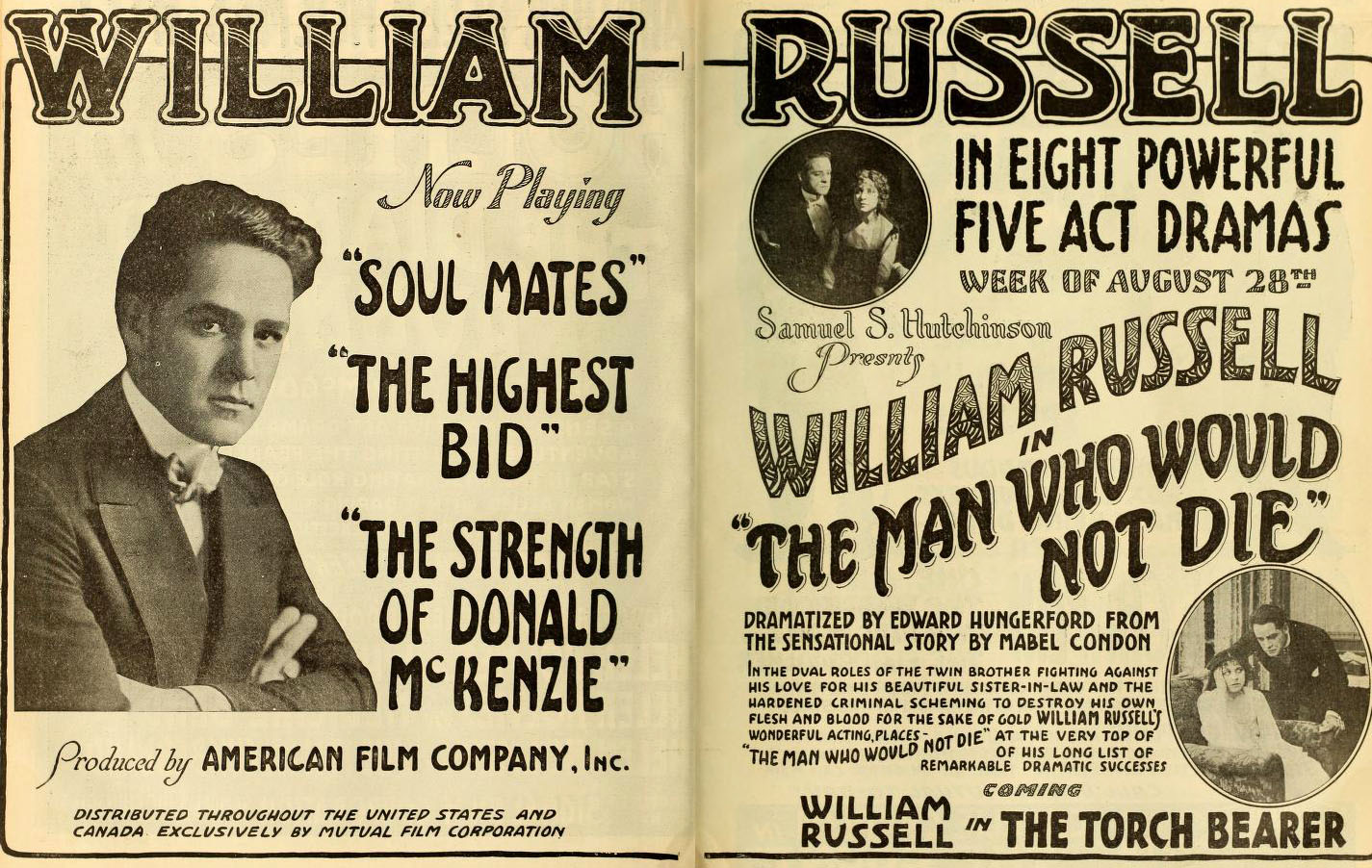
- Directed by: William Russell; Jack Prescott
- Screenplay by: J. Edward Hungerford
- Story by: Mabel Condon
- Produced by: Samuel S. Hutchinson
- Starring: William Russell; Charlotte Burton; Harry Keenan; Leona Hutton
- Cinematography: John W. Brown
- Production company: Flying "A"
- Distributed by: Mutual Film
- Release date: August 31, 1916
- Running time: 50 minutes (5-reels)
- Country: United States
- Language: Silent with English intertitles

The Man Who Would Not Die is a 1916 silent era feature length drama motion picture starring William Russell, Charlotte Burton, Harry Keenan, and Leona Hutton.

Directed by William Russell and Jack Prescott and produced by Samuel S. Hutchinson, the screenplay was adapted by J. Edward Hungerford from a story by Mabel Condon.

This five-reel feature was produced at the American Film Company's Flying "A" Studios in Santa Barbara. It was released on August 31, 1916, and distributed by the Mutual Film Corporation.

Ocean scenes for The Man Who Would Not Die were filmed in May at Long Beach, where Russell and his company of Flying "A" players stayed for a week during the production.

== Plot ==
A wealthy young woman, Agnes (played by Burton), is loved by the identical twin brothers Clyde and Ward Kingsley (dual role played by Russell). She marries Clyde and he immediately begins squandering her fortune. When the money is almost gone, Clyde comes up with a plan to collect on his life insurance policy. As his brother, Ward, who still loves Agnes, is terminally ill, he persuades him to take his place so the insurance company will believe that Clyde has died instead of Ward.

Agnes learns of the plan and is angry. She nurses Ward back to health and falls in love with him during his convalescence. Clyde then hires Steve Mercer (played by Keenan) and Beth Taylor (played by Hutton) to murder his brother. He gets impatient, however, and shoots Ward himself.

When Clyde goes to tell Steve and Beth that their help is no longer needed, they mistake him for Ward and murder him. Ward recovers once again and he and Agnes are married.

== Cast ==
- William Russell as Clyde Kingsley/Ward Kingsley
- Charlotte Burton as Agnes
- Harry Keenan as Steve Mercer
- Leona Hutton as Beth Taylor

== See also ==
- List of American films of 1916
