= The Strength of Donald McKenzie =

1916 film by Jack Prescott, William Russell

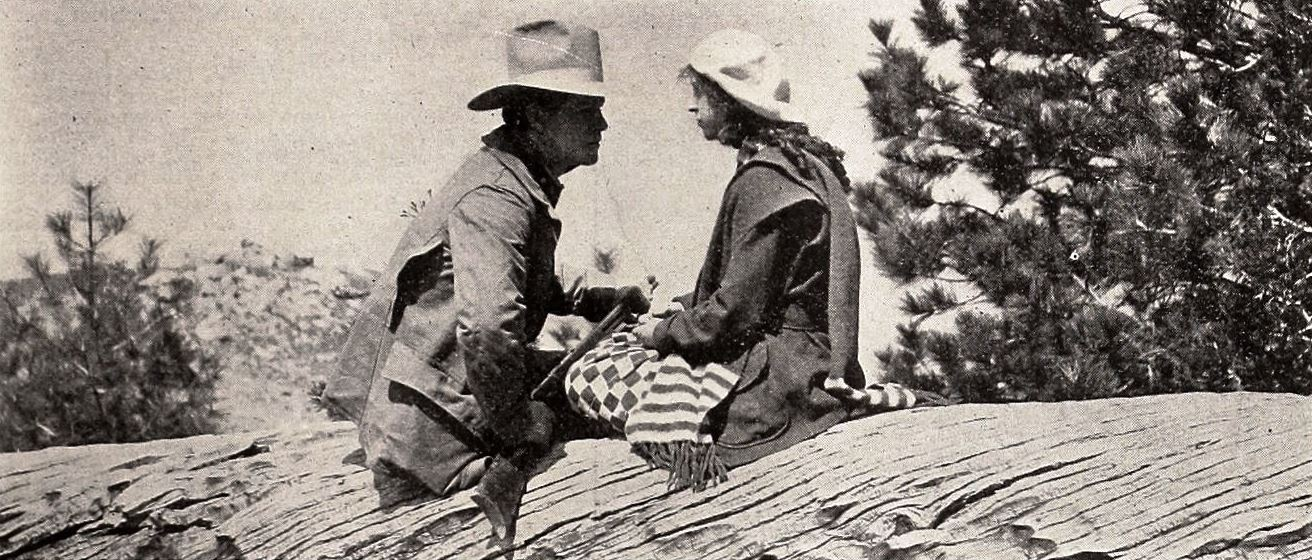
- Film still
- Directed by: William Russell; Jack Prescott
- Written by: J. Edward Hungerford (Scenario)
- Based on: "The Guide" by Russell E. Smith
- Starring: William Russell; Charlotte Burton
- Distributed by: Mutual Film
- Release date: August 3, 1916
- Running time: 5 reels
- Country: United States
- Language: Silent (English intertitles)

The Strength of Donald McKenzie is a 1916 American silent drama film directed by and starring William Russell and John Prescott. The film also stars Charlotte Burton, Harry Keenan, George Ahern, Nell Franzen, and Margaret Nichols.

== Cast ==
- William Russell as Donald McKenzie
- Charlotte Burton as Mabel Condon
- George Ahern as John Condon
- Harry Keenan as Maynard Randall
- John Prescott as Pierre
- Nell Franzen
- Margaret Nichols
