= Leona Hutton =

American actress

- Born: April 8, 1892; St. Joseph, Missouri, US
- Died: April 1, 1949 (aged 56); Toledo, Ohio, US
- Occupation: Actress
- Years active: 1913 to 1916

Leona Hutton (April 8, 1892 – April 1, 1949) was an American actress. Between 1913 and 1916, she appeared in 48 silent era films.

== Career ==
Hutton's motion picture debut was in The Crimson Stain (1913), a three-reel drama short, opposite Frank Borzage and Edward Coxen. It was directed by Jay Hunt for the Mutual Film Company. She also acted in films made by Broncho, Domino, Kay Bee, David Horsley, and New York Motion Picture Corporation studios.

Her final role was as Beth Taylor in The Man Who Would Not Die (1916), a feature length drama starring Russell, who also directed with Jack Prescott at Flying "A" Studios, Santa Barbara, California.

== Wartime service ==
During World War I, Hutton served overseas with the American and French Red Cross.

== Death ==
Hutton, also known as Mrs. Mary Epstein, committed suicide in 1949, by an overdose of codeine. She died in an iron lung in Maumee Hospital in Toledo, Ohio, eighteen hours after she was discovered by her husband. She had been confined to her home for ten weeks because of a leg fracture. Coroner Paul Hohly returned a suicide verdict. Hutton was one week shy of her 57th birthday.
