= The Spirit of the USA =

1924 film

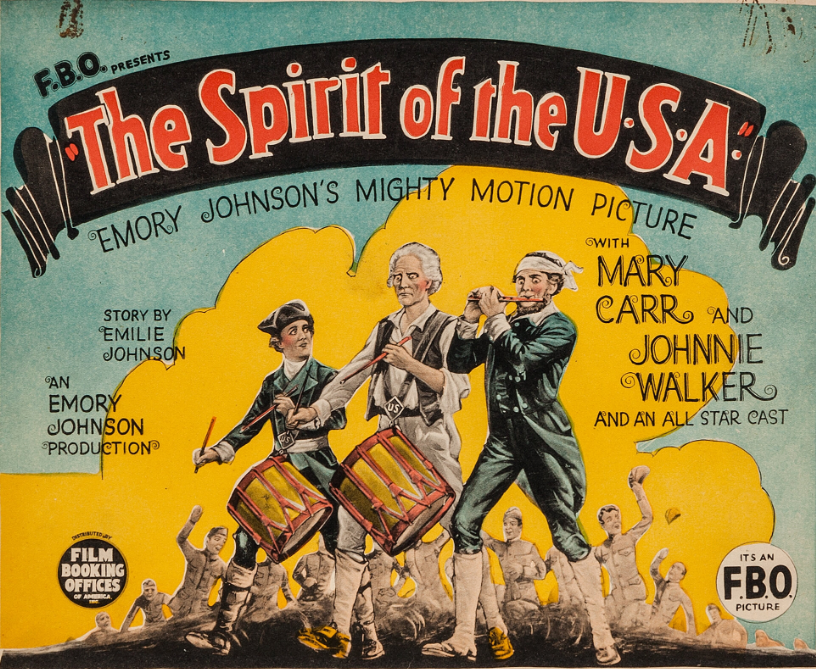
- Directed by: Emory Johnson; Asst Dir Jerry Callahan
- Written by: Emilie Johnson; Story and Screenplay
- Produced by: Pat Powers; Emory Johnson
- Starring: Johnnie Walker; Mary Carr
- Cinematography: Ross Fischer; Leon Eycke
- Distributed by: Film Booking Offices of America
- Release date: May 18, 1924
- Running time: 8 reels
- Country: United States
- Language: Silent (English intertitles)

The Spirit of the USA is a 1924 American silent melodrama directed by Emory Johnson. FBO released the film in May 1924. The film's "All-Star" cast included Johnnie Walker and Mary Carr. Emilie Johnson, Johnson's mother, wrote both the story and screenplay. The Spirit of the USA was the fifth film in Johnson's eight-picture contract with FBO.

The Gains family lives on a farm with their two sons, Johnnie and Silas. When the US enters World War I, Johnnie tries to enlist but is rejected and joins the Salvation Army instead. Meanwhile, Silas marries Zelda Burrows, the daughter of a wealthy neighbor who covets the Gains' farm. Silas later enlists in the Army and is killed in action.

Zelda and her father take advantage of the family's grief and falsely claim that Johnnie has also died in battle, evicting the Gains family and starting to build a dam on their property. However, Johnnie returns home, having survived the war, and fights to reclaim his family's farm. He throws Zelda off the property, blows up the dam, and marries his sweetheart Gretchen. The story ends with the family reunited and living happily ever after.

== Plot ==
"Nestled in the heart of the mothering Alleghenies lies the quaint, old-fashioned Gains farm - a heritage from father to son for generations past."

— First Intertitle

The film begins by showcasing the idyllic scenery surrounding the Gaines farm. (Note: The Gains Farm is introduced as "Nestled in the heart of the Alleghenies," showing its location within this mountain range that spans north-central Pennsylvania, western Maryland, and eastern West Virginia. Later in the movie, a letter sent by the Local Draft board to Silas Gains offers more detailed information about the location of the farm. The letter is addressed to Silas Gains, RFD #2, Gainsboro, Pennsylvania. While Gainsboro is a fictional town, the letter lists the nearest draft board as being in Kent, Pennsylvania. Even though Kent is an actual town, the village is not large enough to support a courthouse.) Thomas Gains, the family patriarch, and his wife Mary live on the farmstead with their two sons, Silas and Johnnie. We see Grandpa Gains mending a toy for his grandson, Johnnie. Old man Gains and Silas walk into the house just as Johnnie begs his grandpa to tell Civil War stories. Johnnie tells his grandpa he will be a soldier, too. Tom pounds the table, declaring that none of his sons will become soldiers.

Eighteen years pass and we meet Robert Washburn, a wealthy landowner who owns vast tracks of land adjacent to the Gaines farm. Washburn's Business consultant, Jim Fuller, advises him that if he were to construct a dam across Coldwater Creek, his property would double in value. Washburn says he tried to buy the Gains farm in the past, but the Gains will not sell. While they continue to talk, Zelda Washburn walks into the room. The elder Washburn agrees to contact the Gains family again. It soon becomes apparent that Fuller and Zelda share mutual feelings for each other.

Washburn and his daughter pay a visit to the Gains farm. While the two men talk, Zelda flirts with Silas. Summoning his courage, Silas invites Zelda to the barn dance, and she accepts. Once again, Thomas Gains turns down Washburn's offer, so Zelda and her father make their way home.

Silas realizes he needs to buy a new suit for the dance. Silas's father is in the barn loading sacks of wheat when Johnnie shows up and starts helping. Johnnie asks his father if he could sell two sacks of grain to buy new suits for him and his brother. The old man says emphatically no, but Johnnie continues to ask. The old man gets upset, throwing his keys on the ground in disgust, and leaves.

Silas overhears the conversation and swiftly rushes over to grab his father's keys. As he is hitching their horse to the wagon, his father reappears. The old man asks Silas where he is going, and Silas tells him he is calling on Zelda. Later, under cover of darkness, Silas returns to the barn and unlocks the door with his father's keys. He loads a sack of grain into the wagon. Johnnie sees him as he is packing a second sack on the wagon. Johnnie confronts him, but Silas says, "It belongs to me as much as anybody. I've worked for it!"

Meanwhile, the old man tries to open a locked drawer but cannot find his keys. Then he remembers tossing them on the ground and makes his way towards the barn. Johnnie is still trying to talk his brother out of stealing the grain. He offers Silas money, but Silas brushes him aside and leaves in the wagon. Suddenly old man Gaines walks in and sees Johnnie holding a wad of cash. He asks Johnnie where he got that money and notices two sacks of grain are missing. He asks Johnnie," What have you become a damn thief?" The old man becomes emotional and strikes Johnnie in his left eye.

The barn dance is scheduled for Saturday, April 6, 1917. After arriving in a brand-new suit at the Washburn's house, Silas escorts Zelda to the dance. Halfway through the festivities, a man arrives on horseback and dashes to the center of the hall. With an urgent tone, he announces "War has been declared."

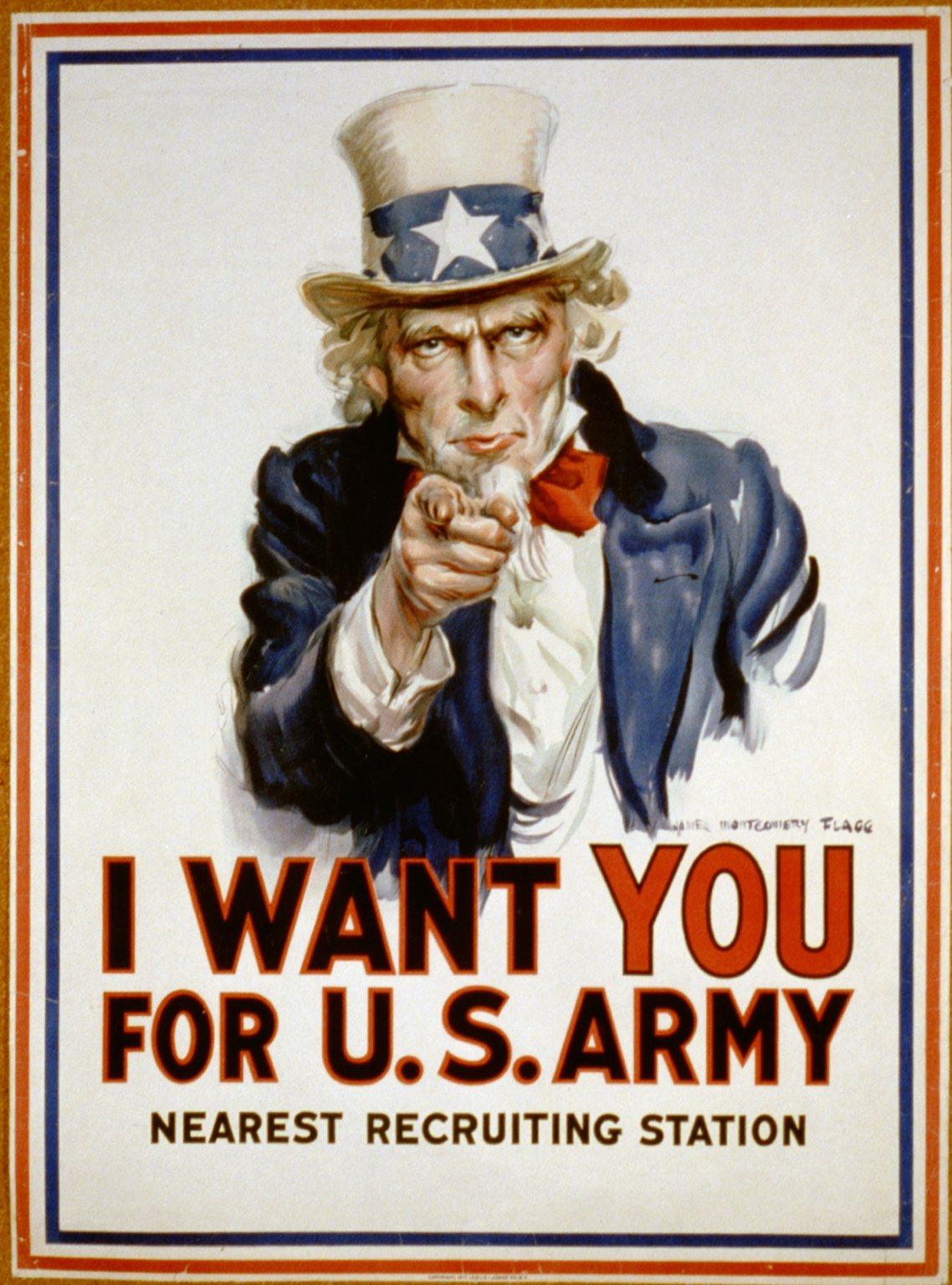
Uncle Sam Recruiting Poster

The following day, Johnnie heeds the call to arms and says he will fight overseas. He grabs his grandpa's old musket and tells his father he is going to enlist. His father is visibly upset. Undeterred, he bids farewell to his mother, but his father refuses to shake his hand. Johnnie heads to the train depot with his musket and dog.

After boarding the train, Johnnie arrives at the induction center and attempts to enlist in the Army. He is given a physical but fails the eye exam. He is classified as "Class V." (Note: Conscription was implemented based on a class system, with the initial batch of candidates drawn from Class I. Once Class I was depleted, subsequent selections were made from Class II and so forth. In the context of World War I, the initial registration took place on June 5, 1917, mandating that all men aged 21 to 30 had to register for the draft. The various classes are shown below: 1. Eligible and liable for military service; 2. Temporarily deferred, but available for military service; 3. Temporarily exempted, but available for military service; 4. Exempted due to extreme hardship; 5. Exempted or ineligible for induction into military service) While sitting outside the induction center, a Salvation Army volunteer approaches Johnnie. The volunteer calls attention to a contingent of Salvation Army workers getting ready to ship overseas. Johnnie is impressed, then joins the Salvation Army and is shipped overseas.

Now that Johnnie is gone, Thomas Gains makes an important decision. He names Silas as the sole owner of the Gains farm. Then at Robert Washburn's urging, Silas quickly marries Zelda hoping to avoid the draft. The couple settles into their new home - the Gaines farmhouse. Zelda immediately becomes dissatisfied with her archaic surroundings. As each day passes, Zelda becomes more disenchanted. She especially hates the noisy birds that Johnnie gave to his mother. Zelda finally grabs the birdcage and throws it out the door. The birds escape, and his mother has nothing to remind her of Johnnie. Zelda gets more upset and tells Silas she hates him because he is a coward.

The next day, Silas receives a draft letter from the Local Draft board. He must register for the draft on May 17 at 10 am. " Silas feels inspired and says, "We'll see who the coward is."

The scene switches to the fields in France. We see Johnnie cooking donuts for the troops, and then we see Silas on the front lines. While Silas is firing from a trench, he receives a fatal shot to the heart. As Silas lies on the ground, mortally wounded, Johnnie chances upon him just as he rolls over and dies. Johnnie puts on his brother's uniform, grabs his rifle, goes over the top, and becomes a hero. Back at the Gaines farm, Thomas and Mary receive a letter from Johnnie. The letter reads

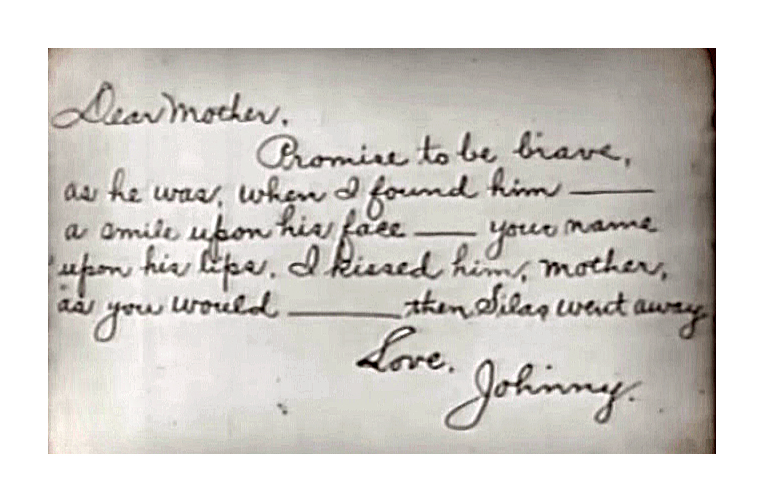
Johnny's letter to mother

Dear Mother,
Promise to be brave,
as he was when I found him —
a smile upon his face — your name
upon his lips. I kissed him, Mother,
as you would, — then Silas went away.
Love,
Johnny.

While enjoying the company of her lover, Jim Fuller, Zelda's attention is drawn to the letter. Then Fuller confidently states that Johnnie had met the same fate as Silas. Zelda declares, "This letter makes me the rightful owner of this place." She promptly throws Thomas and Mary out on the street.

As Armistice Day arrives, a train steams into the depot hauling Johnnie and his dog. Both parents warmly greet him. Johnnie goes to the old house, where Zelda and Fuller are mapping out their next scheme. He thrashes Fuller and tosses them both on the street. Johnnie's father tells him the Washburns have built a dam to reroute his water supply. Johnnie races out of the house and demolishes the dam. After the explosion, water floods down the canyon, sweeping away Fuller and Zelda. Johnnie returns home and sees Gretchen, who has patiently awaited Johnnie's return. They embrace, the whole family hugs, and they all live happily ever after.

== Cast ==
Actor	Role
Johnnie Walker	Johnnie Gains
Mary Carr	Mary Gains
Carl Stockdale	Thomas Gains
Mark Fenton	John J. Burrows
William S. Hooser	Otto Schultz
Gloria Grey	Gretchen Schultz
Rosemary Cooper	Zelda Burrows
David Kirby	Jim Fuller
Cuyler Supplee	Silas Gains
Dick Brandon	Little Johnnie Gains
Newton House	Little Silas Gains
Richard Morris	Grandpa Gains

== Production ==
Melodrama is our meat - but it's high-class melodrama. It allowed the public to weep and sympathize with the handsome hero and the beautiful heroine. We don't want to label our pictures, we must make pictures that appeal to all.

— Joe Kennedy
Member FBO board of directors,

Film Booking Offices of America (FBO) operated as an independent studio during the silent era of American cinema. FBO, which churned out nearly 110 features and shorts a year, sought to make low-budget films across multiple genres, including westerns, action-packed thrillers, romantic melodramas, and comedy shorts. The company primarily distributed its productions to modest-sized towns and independent theater chains that frequently refreshed their film selections three times per week. FBO would appeal to every member of the American family with its pictures.

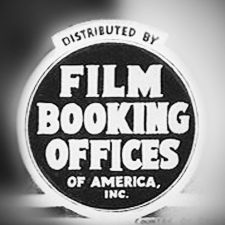
FBO logo

In 1924, the average cost per FBO production ranged from $50,000 to $75,000, which is equivalent to $961,730 to $1,442,594 in 2022 currency. Major film studios, in stark contrast, had far bigger budgets, costing up to five times as much to make a single film. Alongside their regular productions, FBO also undertook a few high-budget projects known as "Gold Bond" or "Special" productions. During his tenure at FBO, Emory Johnson worked exclusively on eight films in this category.

In 1923, Emilie and Emory Johnson entered into a contract extension with FBO, which spanned two and one-half years. The terms of the agreement stated that Emory was obligated to create eight attractions for FBO. The agreement acknowledged that his previous four films would be included in this tally. To support the production of the remaining four films, FBO committed to investing two and a half million dollars, which, in today's currency, is equivalent to $40,472,167 in 2021.

Additionally, an integral part of the new contract stated that Emory Johnson's mother, Mrs. Emilie Johnson, would be responsible for developing all the stories and writing the scripts for the Johnson attractions. Furthermore, she would assist her son during the filming process.

=== Pre production ===
==== Casting ====
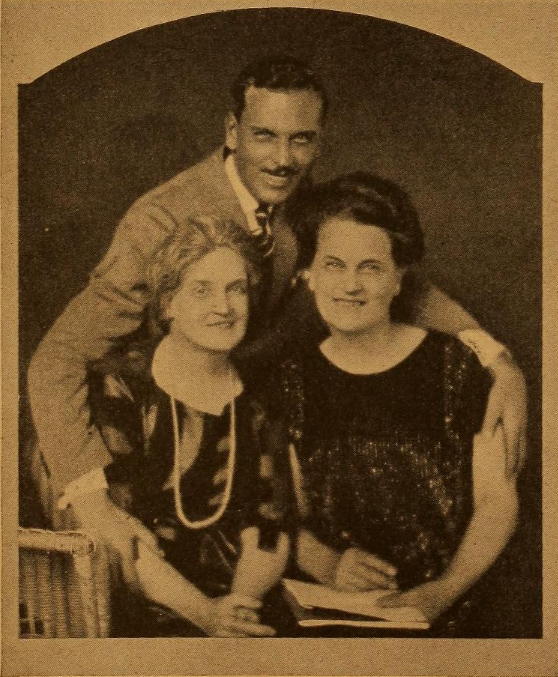
Photo of Mary Carr, Emory Johnson and Emilie Johnson from 1924

- Mary Carr (née Mary Kennivan) (1874–1973) was born on March 14, 1874, in Germantown, Pennsylvania. She was 50 when she played Gold Star Mother Mary Gains, Tom's wife, and Johnnie's mother. (Note: In every media listing of characters for this film, Mary Carr is consistently credited as playing Mary Gains. However, in the actual movie, the Intertitle explicitly introduces her character as Clorinda Gains. The title card reads — Clorinda Gains, the "Balance-wheel" of her humble home.) This was her first role in a Johnson production. Her next performance in a Johnson vehicle would be the 1927 Universal production of The Fourth Commandment, where she played another mother figure. Carr and Walker shared the spotlight in this film, with FBO promoting their roles as a reunion of sorts. The reference alluded to the film Over the Hill to the Poorhouse, an 11-reel motion picture distributed by Fox on September 17, 1920. In this movie, Carr portrayed a destitute mother, while Walker played her son. One FBO magazine ad for this movie contained the word segment — Together Again for the first time since their never-to-be-forgotten success "Over The Hill."
  Initially, Carr worked as a schoolteacher but abandoned the profession to become an actor in traveling theater companies. She married fellow actor William Carr and accompanied him on tours with his theater troupe. In the early 1900s, William ventured into film production. He enlisted Mary and their six children to join him in the burgeoning film industry. In 1915, Mary began her career in film, eventually becoming a character actor celebrated for her roles as maternal figures. She appeared in over 140 films between 1915 – 1956. (Note: Although Over the Hill catapulted Carr into motherhood stardom, 1925 would prove an even more eventful year. First, she become the other Auntie Em with her role in The Wizard of Oz released on April 13, 1925. Later in the year, she played a mother in the celebrated World Word I picture – The Big Parade released on November 5, 1925.) She was also a close friend of Emilie Johnson.

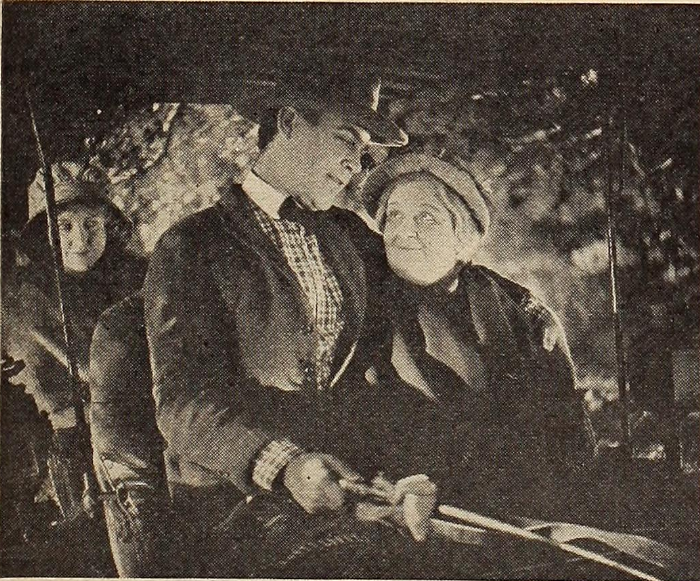
still from The Spirit of the USA

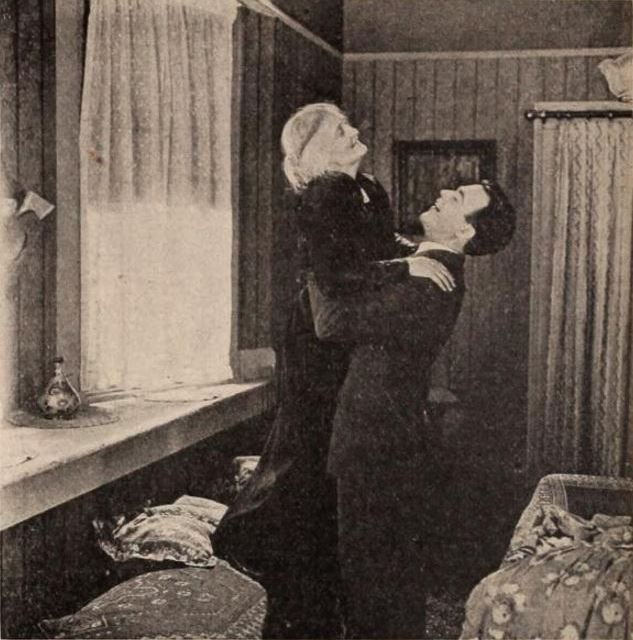
Over the Hill to the Poorhouse

- Johnnie Walker (1894–1949) was born on January 7, 1894, in New York City, New York. He was an established actor when the 30 year-old actor played Johnnie Gains, the son of Thomas Gains. This was Walker his fourth appearance in a Johnson production. He previously had featured roles in Johnson's FBO vehicles – In the Name of the Law, The Third Alarm, and The Mailman. This movie would also provide the much-anticipated reunion of Walker with Mary Carr. They had experienced previous success in filming the 1920 9-reel production of Over the Hill to the Poorhouse.
  Walker would appear in a total of five Johnson FBO productions. He played the son of the film's leading father figure in each film. In each of Walker's supporting roles, the character was named Johnnie or a derivative. (Note: Johnnie Connections: The 1922 film In the Name of the Law Ralph Lewis played Patrick O'Hara and Walker played Johnnie O'Hara; The 1922 film The Third Alarm Ralph Lewis played Dan McDowell and Walker played Johnny McDowell; The 1923 film The Mailman Ralph Lewis played Bob Morley and Walker played Johnnie Morley; The 1924 film The Spirit of the USA Carl Stockdale played Thomas Gains and Walker played Johnnie Gains; The 1924 film Life's Greatest Game Tom Santschi player Jack Donovan and Walker player Jackie Donovan Jr.; He also would have played Ralph Lewis's son, Johnny Buckley in the movie The West~Bound Limited, except he was involved in filming The Fourth Musketeer.)
  Walker is five feet eleven inches tall, with black hair and blue eyes. AFI credits the actor with 48 Titles in his Filmography.
  Walker would be featured in Johnson's sixth film for FBO – Life's Greatest Game, released in October 1924. Life's Greatest Game was Walker's fifth and final role in an Emory Johnson production.
- Carl Stockdale (born William Carlton Stockdale) (1874–1953) was born on February 19, 1874, in Worthington, Minnesota. At 50, he was already a well-known character actor when he portrayed Thomas Gains, the father of Johnnie Gains. This film marked Stockdale's sole appearance in a Johnson production. Standing at a height of five feet eleven inches, he possessed brown hair and blue-grey eyes.
  Stockdale started his career as a property master with a repertory theatrical company. He then spent 15 years on stage in repertory theater and vaudeville. In 1913, at the relatively late age of 39, Stockdale ventured into the realm of films, joining the Essanay Studios and securing a minor role in a Broncho Billy's Western. He worked with Essanay for two years before joining the David W. Griffith Corp's film company. As Stockdale's career unfolded, he seamlessly adapted from silent films to talkies. In his last movie, he acted uncredited in Hangmen Also Die!, released in 1943.
- Mark Fenton (1866–1925) was born on November 11, 1866, in Crestline, Ohio. He achieved fame as an American stage performer and motion-picture character actor who appeared in at least 80 films between 1915 and 1925. At 57, he was already an established actor when he portrayed John J. Burrows, a prosperous landowner. This film marked Fenton's only appearance in a Johnson production.
  Fenton began his acting journey in his twenties, launching his career in vaudeville and theatrical productions around the turn of the century. In 1915, at the late age of 49, Fenton started acting in movies. Joining the ranks of other actors who transitioned from the legitimate stage to the silver screen later in life, Fenton was widely regarded as a character actor. Demonstrating his versatility, he appeared in a diverse range of film genres, including action and westerns, accumulating an extensive body of work. Tragically, Fenton's life was cut short by an automobile accident. On July 29, 1925, at the age of 58, he succumbed to complications arising from surgery.
- William S. Hooser (1836–unk) was born on July 20, 1836, in Litchfield, Illinois. The octogenarian was 87 when he portrayed the character of Otto Schultz, Gretchen's father. He was an individual of remarkable longevity in the business. During his brief film career, Hooser appeared in The Highest Bid (1916), The Return (1916), and this movie.
  Prior to his venture into films, William S. Hooser had already established himself as a prominent figure in the entertainment industry. His career included engagements with renowned personalities such as P. T. Barnum, Dan Rice and Frank C. Bostock. Hooser exhibited a diverse range of talents, including dancing, singing, playing the piano, impersonations, and character acting. Furthermore, he was known for his ability to perform mental and psychic demonstrations, adding another intriguing dimension to his repertoire.
- Gloria Grey (née Maria Dragomanovich)(1909–1947) was born on October 23, 1909, in Portland, Oregon. She was 14 when she played Gretchen Schultz, the daughter of German-born Otto Schultz. Gretchen is the woman whom Johnnie Gains fancied before joining the salvation army and heading off to war. Since she portrayed the daughter of a German character, she injected a paradoxical element into the film, as both brothers willingly enlisted to combat the Germans during World War I. This film was her third credited movie role and her only appearance in a Johnson production. She would blossom into a screen actress and director.
  Before launching her film career in 1923, Grey showcased her talent in vaudeville. Besides making movies, she became one of the WAMPAS Baby Stars in 1924 along with Clara Bow. Her career was spent making 33 films during the 1920s in Hollywood, and five Spanish-language films made in Argentina during World War II. Grey was petite, standing at 5'2" and weighing 115 pounds. Her distinctive features included beautiful blonde hair and blue eyes.
- Rosemary Cooper (1898–1961) was born on January 1, 1898, in Lewiston, Idaho. She was 26 when she played the villainess Zelda Burrows, the daughter of John Burrows and the woman who married Silas Gains. She made her screen debut in the Johnson production of The Mailman. Notably, this was Cooper's third film and her final appearance in a Johnson film.
  Rosemary Cooper had spent a couple of years with various stock companies before making her screen debut in 1923. AFI credits her with making 15 silent movies in the twenties. However, with the advent of sound in films, Cooper decided to step away from the industry. Rosemary Cooper stood at a height of 5'4" and weighed 125 pounds. She possessed auburn hair and brown eyes
- David Kirby (1880–1954) (1880–1954) was born on July 16, 1880, in St. Louis, Missouri. He was a prominent actor when the 43 year-old played the villainous Jim Fuller. Like his previous outing in The West~Bound Limited, Kirby is once again cast as a heavy along with Rosemary Cooper. Throughout his collaboration with Emory Johnson, he appeared in a total of six of Johnson's productions, making him the actor with the highest number of appearances in Johnson's films.
  Physically, Kirby stood at a height of five feet eleven inches, possessing brown hair and eyes. AFI credits the actor/director with 33 Titles in Filmography.
- Cuyler Supplee (1894–1944) was born on February 13, 1894, in Germantown, Pennsylvania. He was 30 when he played Silas Gains, the oldest son in the Gains Family. His next appearance in a Johnson production would be FBO's The Last Edition, released in November 1925, and his last would be Johnson's The Lone Eagle, released in August 1927. He was an actor and author. According to the American Film Institute, his brief acting career spanned 12 features from 1922 through 1928. Supplee's roles were all character parts.
- Dicky Brandon (née Richard Ellison Brandon) (1919 – 2010) ) was born on March 30, 1919, in Toledo, Ohio. He was 5 years old when he played the role of Little Johnnie Gains. This was his first role in a movie. Life's Greatest Game, released in October 1924, would mark his final appearance in a Johnson production.
  He belonged to the vast pool of child actors in the bustling child actor market of the American film industry. His career was brief, and he only made a few movies in his mid-twenties. This movie is one of his six listed on AFI.
- Newton House (1911–1987) was born on November 1, 1911, in Holly, Colorado. He was 12 when he played a younger version of Silas Gains before he reached adulthood. This was his third role in movies, his 2nd credited role, and his 2nd feature film. He was one of six children born to actor and stuntman Jack House (1887-1963). Many of Newton's siblings also entered the acting field, including brothers Don and Jimmy. By the time Newton turned 15, his aptitude for horsemanship became evident as he amassed 112 trophies for his exceptional skill in trick and fancy riding. AFI shows him playing supporting character roles between 1924 - 1936. He successfully transitioned into talkies, acting in several films between 1932 and 1936. AFI also shows him getting credit as a makeup artist from 1939 to 1945.
- Richard (Dick) Morris (1862–1924) was born on January 30, 1862, in Charlestown, Massachusetts. The accomplished actor was 62 years-old actor when played Grandpa Gains. Morris had previously acted in In the Name of the Law and The Third Alarm. This was his final appearance in a Johnson film because of his unfortunate death in October 1924.
  Morris' educational journey included an immersive experience abroad, where he dedicated three years to studying grand opera. He later embarked on a professional career as an opera singer, touring America for two seasons and spending three years in London singing opera. In September 1909, he joined the Lubin organization and made his first movie appearance in 1912 when he was 50. Throughout his career, and like most men entering movies at a late age, he played character roles and heavies.

==== Director ====
This film was directed by Emory Johnson, a former actor who transitioned to directing. His acting journey began in 1912, starting as an extra in early Broncho Billy Westerns. From 1913 to 1922, Johnson appeared in 73 movies for studios like Essanay, Universal, Pathé, and Goldwyn, before FBO allowed him to direct his first film. In 1921, he felt that the time was ripe for him to take the reins of filmmaking.

At 30, Johnson directed this film as part of his eight-picture contract with FBO and marked his fifth collaboration with the studio. Before this, his four FBO films—In the Name of the Law, The Third Alarm, The West~Bound Limited and The Mailman—had achieved financial success.

During his tenure at FBO, Johnson earned several titles, such as the Master of Melodrama, King of Exploitation, and Hero of the Working Class. His films encompassed various genres, including melodramas, (Note: We have come to the day when the public is demanding consistent, human stories. We do not believe that the American people want to see only pictures of the ultra-rich. Our characters in The Midnight Call are simple folk — belonging to the great American middle class. The drama and comedy of their lives will reflect the emotions of the great majority of picturegoers. It is the human note that makes the picture today. It is that quality of sincerity that makes the drama ring true. Surely the industry has had this proved to them in the past year. The biggest successes have not been the pictures with the biggest sets — but they have been the pictures with the most human stories. Emory Johnson Director) and he continued to flourish as an independent director. Johnson's success stemmed from his ability to create epic films and commercially viable movies that resonated with subjects close to his heart and his mother's.

During his career, Emory Johnson directed thirteen films - eleven silents and two Talkies.

==== Themes ====
What the world needs most today is a better understanding of humanity. What it wants are love and human sympathy. Thus, I have set out to make love the theme of all my productions. I have sought to show how whole families are lifted from sorrow to contentment by love and kindly sediments.

— Emory Johnson,

Love, the greatest of human emotions, is once again the central theme (Note: What Is a Theme in Movies? "A theme is the film's central, unifying concept. A theme evokes a universal human experience and can be stated in one word or short phrase (for example, "love", "death", or "coming of age"). The theme may never be stated explicitly, but it is exemplified by the film's plot, dialogue, cinematography, and music.") of this Emory Johnson's Melodrama. In his previous four productions, Johnson's emphasized the deep connection between a father and son, showcasing a prominent father figure, a nurturing mother figure, a devoted son, a captivating female lead, and a few child actors. Within the tapestry of these specials, Johnson masterfully intertwines courage, dedication, a sense of responsibility, the importance of family, high moral principles, loyalty, and selfless acts of sacrifice. This approach to creating films, resonated well with audiences, resulting in significant success at the box office. These films were also fitting of the new era, where movie fans sought more family-oriented cinema, action films, and films with intelligent plots.

In a departure from his previous narratives, this storyline emphasizes the profound bond between a mother and her son. By incorporating the theme of motherhood, it provided a contrasting element to balance the intense war scenes depicted in the movie. The film also portrayed one of the most devastating tragedies a mother can face — the shattering loss of a son.

==== Screenplay ====
The greatest appeal in pictures is not in extravagant spectacles, historical pageants, or adaptation of fairy tales. I think the straight-forward, clean, wholesome Melodrama will always have the choice corner in the hearts of the American public.

— Writer Emilie Johnson,

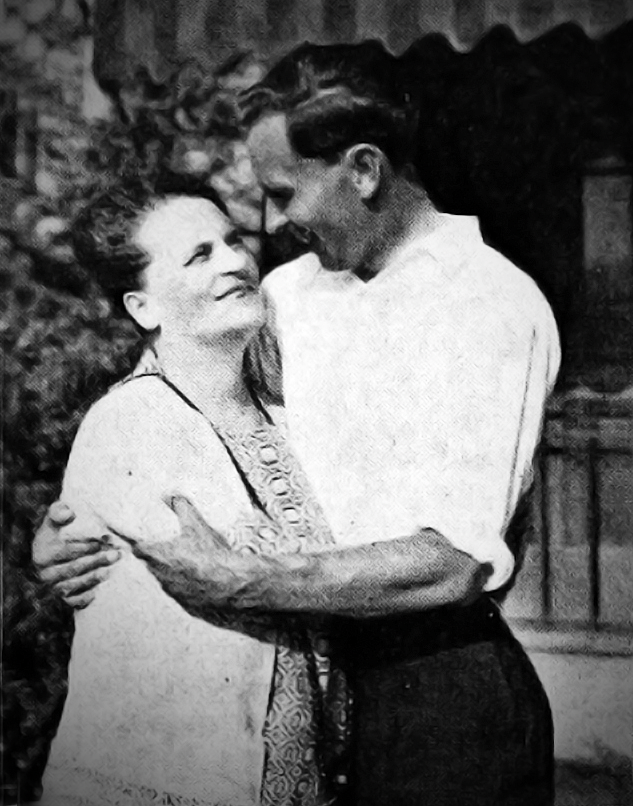
Emilie and Emory in 1923

Emilie Johnson was 56 years old when she wrote the story and the screen adaptation for this film. The Spirit of The U.S.A. was the fifth film in the 8-picture FBO contract. The idealism of former President Woodrow Wilson (Wilson died on February 3, 1924) served as an inspiration for Emilie Johnson. (Note: President Woodrow Wilson had emphasized the importance of establishing organized peace among nations. Mrs. Johnson was quoted as saying "The world would be a better place in which to live, if public officials had more of the fine, broad idealism which characterized the career of our late President.")

Emilie Johnson (1867–1941) was born on June 3, 1867, in Gothenburg, Västra Götaland, Sweden. After emigrating to America, she married Alfred Jönsson. Their only son was born in 1894 – actor, director and writer Alfred Emory Johnson.

In the 1920s, Emilie and Emory Johnson developed one of the unique collaborations in the annals of Hollywood. The decade saw the mother-son team develop into the most financially successful directing and writing team in motion picture history. She wrote most of the stories and screenplays her son used for his career in directing melodramas. Emilie Johnson wrote stories about lunch pail characters living paycheck-to-paycheck like law enforcement officers, firefighters, mail carriers, railroad engineers, patriots, baseball players, and newspaper press operators. (Note: Emory Johnson said the following about his mother: My mother, Mrs. Emily Johnson, has that invaluable ability to cram human emotions into a photoplay. She has the ripened, matured viewpoint of the average mother. Sometimes I think mothers would make the greatest of all scenario writers because they have a particular human slant on life. Women are as well equipped as men to take up the important work of writing for the screen is already established by the success of many women writers who have fashioned their stories directly for the screen. The average woman has a deep and well-rounded understanding of life. She has little human qualities developed to a far greater degree than the average man.)

Emilie's conviction in the cinematic potential of her human-interest stories was matched by her son's ability to bring them to life on the silver screen in grand, sweeping melodramas. The Johnsons collaborated closely, working alongside each other during the pre-production phase and continuing their partnership on set once filming commenced. This extraordinary creative alliance flourished throughout the entire decade, albeit gradually fading in the early 1930s.

=== Filming ===
==== Interiors ====
Interiors for this movie were filmed at the FBO studios located at 780 Gower Street in Hollywood.

An article in the February 9, 1924, issue of article in Camera! stated, "one evening's work was done at the lobby at the Manx Hotel" in San Francisco.

==== Exteriors ====
According to the American Film Institute catalog, the exteriors for this picture were shot in:

- San Francisco, California — is the location of the Presidio military post. The camp was used to recreate two famous battles of World War I. The United States Government gave permission for Johnson to use "over a thousand American soldiers, more than six hundred cavalry horses and the full equipment of modern warfare including tanks, motor lorries, aeroplanes, and hundreds of big guns."
- Chatsworth California — An article in the March 15, 1924, issue of Exhibitors Herald announced: "One of the biggest dam break scenes ever put in film is reported to be a feature of Emory Johnson's next production for Film Booking Offices ...The dam break scenes were filmed in Chatsworth."

==== Schedule ====
This timetable is a detailed outline of the shooting schedule, editing process, and eventual release of this picture. The schedule was constructed by incorporating dates sourced from Camera! "Pulse of the Studios" and other trade journals. This film start shooting in December 1923 and was "In the Can" April 1924.

The timetable shows the first week of shooting under the auspices of R—C Studios located on Melrose and 780 Gower. Starting with the 6th week of shooting, the studio changes to F.B.O.Studios at the same location.

The processing stage displayed in Camera! used the following entries for this film:

Director	Star	Cameraman	Ass't Director	Scenarist	Type
Emory Johnson	All-Star	Ross Fisher		Mrs. Emilie Johnson	Swords and Plow Shares

◆ Schedule and Release ◆
Year	Month	Day	Progress	Ref
1923	Dec	24–31	1st week of principal photography*	
1924	Jan	05	Battle scenes photographed in a few weeks at the army post in San Francisco — the Presidio having the full cooperation of the U. S. Army company will recreate two of the biggest battles in the Great War.	
1924	Jan	1–31	2nd week through 6th week of shooting.	
1924	Feb	04	7th and final week of Shooting	
1924	Feb	09	"Johnson will begin this week to film the battle scenes at the Presidio, and will employ more than 1,000 soldiers, 600 cavalry horses, motor lorries, tanks, machine guns and other equipment of modem warfare."	
1924	Feb	18	1st week of editing. This was the final listing for Swords and Plow Shares since this was the last issue of the Camera!	
1924	Mar	08	"Final scenes of Emory Johnson's fifth production for Film Booking Offices were filmed in San Francisco."	
1924	Apr	19	"Produced under the working title of Swords and Ploughshares, changed to Honor Thy Mother upon completion, the Emory Johnson picture, soon to be released by F.B.O. has been finally named The Spirit of the U.S.A."	
1924	May	12	Copyright for The Spirit of the U.S.A. was secured and Moving Picture World publicized a release date of Monday, May 12, 1924.	
1924	May	18	"The New York debut and world's premiere of Emory Johnson's new production for the Film Booking Offices, The Spirit of the U.S.A. will take place at the Lric Theater Sunday evening May 18."	
1924	May	31	Moving Picture World announced a release date of Saturday, May 31, 1924, the day after Decoration Day.	

==== Working title ====
During the production phase, films need a reference name to identify the project, often called an Alternate or Working title. Often, the working title becomes the official release title of the film. There are two main reasons for employing working titles:

- When an official title has not been determined: Sometimes, during the early stages of production, the filmmakers have not finalized the title for the film. In such cases, a working title is assigned temporarily to provide a recognizable identifier for the project.
- Disguising the project's true nature: Sometimes, a non-descriptive working title is chosen to conceal the actual reason for creating the movie. This strategy prevents speculation or leaks concerning the film's content or plot.

This particular picture underwent multiple name changes.

Searching for a Title
Month	Day	Year	Event	Note
Dec	23	1923	The initial name assigned to the project was Swords and Plowshares. This title would occasionally morph into — Swords and Plow Shares and Swords and Ploughshares.	None
Mar	13	1924	"The title of Emory Johnson's new production for F.B.O. will be "Spirit of America." The working title was Swords and Ploughshares.	
Mar	22	1924	"The film booking offices mailed over 500 exhibitors copies of the script of Johnson's new production, called Swords and Plowshares in hopes of securing a suitable title. The producers are willing to pay as high as $1000 for an appropriate title."	
Apr	08	1924	Johnson's fifth production will be called "Honor Your Mother." FBO surveyed 500 exhibitors and 8% believe "Swords and Plowshares" was a good box office title but 84% thought "Honor Your Mother", was a better title. The winning title was originated by J.J. Sampson, manager of F.B.O.'s Chicago exchange, who received a check for $350.	
Apr	14	1924	The Billboard article read: "Emory Johnson's fifth production for the Film Booking Offices will be called Honor Your Mother. This announcement is made as the result of the replies and suggestions received from more than 500 exhibitors."	
Apr	19	1924	"Produced under the working title of Swords and Ploughshares, changed to Honor Thy Mother upon completion, the Emory Johnson picture, soon to be released by F.B.O. has been finally named The Spirit of the U.S.A."	

=== Post production ===
==== Music ====
Song recorded Henry Burr Victor 18524
Jan 29, 1919 Camden, New Jersey
That Wonderful Mother of Mine
"Theme Song and Melody for Emory Johnson's Mighty Motion Picture The Spirit of the U.S.A."

Songs my mother taught me (2:24)
Composed in 1880 by Antonin Dvorák (1841-1904), text by Adolf Heyduk (1835-1923), performed by Australian singer Nellie Melba (1861-1931) in 1916. This is sung in English.

During the era of silent movies, the presence of musical accompaniment varied from theater to theater. Unlike modern films with consistent scores, silent movies did not have accompanying music that traveled with the film. The provision of musical accompaniment depended on the individual theater. Some larger theaters boasted full orchestras, while smaller venues relied on pianos or organs to provide a musical backdrop. As previously mentioned, the central theme of the film revolved around the profound love shared between a mother and her son. In one of its various title iterations, the movie was named, Honor Your Mother. It follows, one of the popular choices for the musical background would be a mother song.

In the book – Music of the First World War, the author points out "Everyone loves and cherishes their mom. And there were many "Mother" songs during the early years of the 20th century ..."That Wonderful Mother of Mine" and "Little Mother of Mine" were published in 1918."

The song That Wonderful Mother of Mine was copyrighted in 1918 with music by Walter Goodwin and lyrics by Clyde Hager. Walter Goodwin later published his music with the title, "Theme Song and Melody for Emory Johnson's Mighty Motion Picture "The Spirit of the U.S.A." with Mary Carr and Johnnie Walker." A theater Maestro in a large theater in California selected the hauntingly beautiful Songs My Mother Taught Me by Antonín Dvořák along with other scores.

All wars seem to produce their sets of favorite songs and World War One was no different. We also see songs published at the conclusion of World War One with the title of The spirit of the U.S.A. including:

- The spirit of the U.S.A. a service song by N. Bryan published in 1918.
- The spirit of the U.S.A. by E. Edouard published in 1918.
- The Spirit of the U.S.A. by Ronald Buck

==== Studios ====
In 1922, the Robertson-Cole Distributing Corporation reorganized and rebranded itself as FBO. As part of this change, FBO secured land at the intersection of Melrose Avenue and Gower Street in Los Angeles. After purchasing this lot, FBO constructed administration offices to support day-to-day operations. They also built film stages to facilitate shooting interior scenes for motion pictures.

Then, FBO purchased 460 acres of land in Santa Monica, which became known as the "R-C Ranch." The outdoor locale was a picturesque setting for various exterior filming requirements.

== Release and reception ==
New York City had a tradition of hosting the Premieres of Emory Johnson's films. In July 1922, Johnson premiered his first motion picture, In The Name of the Law, at the George M. Cohan Theater. FBO premiered Johnson's second production, The Third Alarm, in January 1923 at the prestigious Astor Theatre. In April 1923, FBO premiered Johnson's third film, The West~Bound Limited, by booking a ballroom at the Astor Hotel. The premiere of The Mailman was shared between Washington and Philadelphia. FBO reverted to its standard practice of premiering new films in New York with this film. The opportunity to engage with the discerning audience of New York City on Broadway had the potential to generate unparalleled publicity for a movie.

When the FBO showcased In the Name of the Law, they established a connection between the screening venue and the local police departments. This approach was replicated when they linked firefighters to The Third Alarm, railroad workers to The West~Bound Limited, and postal workers to The Mailman. Although it was not marketed as a war film, FBO strategically cultivated a relationship with the armed forces for this movie, positioning it as a recruitment tool to attract volunteers and encourage enlistment in the National Guard.

=== New York Premiere ===
The World Premiere of this film occurred at the Lyric Theatre in New York City on Sunday, May 18, 1924. The movie was scheduled for a two-week engagement, concluding on May 31.

To commemorate the film's premiere, FBO orchestrated a grand Parade down Broadway featuring two Artillery Regiments. The parade ended in front of the Lyric Theater with an Exhibition drill in Times Square that stopped traffic in the heart of the Broadway Theater District. On Tuesday, May 20, several units staged a demonstration at City Hall Square, providing an opportunity for the Mayor to inspect the troops. The guns and carriages prominently displayed advertising banners while uniformed individuals distributed handouts to the enthusiastic crowds. During the two-week run of the film, special regimental nights were scheduled, where different regiments would march down to the theater and perform brief drill demonstrations.

=== Official release ===
Mon, May 12, 1924	Copyright for the 8-reel The Spirit of the U.S.A. secured by R-C (Robertson-Cole) Pictures Corp, with registration number LP20290. Moving Picture World published release date of Monday, May 12, 1924, for this film.
Sun, May 18, 1924	World Premiere in New York City, but a film's release date is rarely the same as its world premiere. In line with AFI, all websites reviewing this film show release date Sunday, May 18, 1924. However, pictures are not typically released for distribution on a Sunday.
Fri, May 30, 1924	Decoration Day (Memorial Day in 2023) was observed on Friday, May 30, 1924. Significant because film is about a Gold Star Mother.
Sat, May 31, 1924	June 7, 1924, issue Moving Picture World announced a release date of Saturday, May 31, 1924

=== Advertising ===
Swords and Plowshares is in no sense a war picture. It will have a powerful war background, to be sure, but it will be essentially a human drama, omitting none of the sound and dramatic ingredients which have figured so vitally in the success of my recent photoplay.

— Emory Johnson,

In the past, FBO successfully implemented an advertising strategy by forging local partnerships with the organization supporting the specific working-class hero depicted in the film. They actively encouraged these local organizations to coordinate stunts, appreciation parades, and various activities, effectively securing complimentary advertising for the film. When available, an F.B.O. agent would collaborate closely with the theater owner to develop an exploitation strategy for the movie. This film posed a minor challenge for FBO. Although it was not marketed as a war film, FBO strategically cultivated a relationship with the armed forces for this movie, positioning it as a recruitment tool to attract volunteers and encourage enlistment in the National Guard. Most advertising for this movie had a military component.

One of the goals of premiering this film in New York was to establish advertising standards for its nationwide promotion. The New York premiere used a military parade marching down Broadway to attract public attention. FBO's publicity department also staged drill formations in City Hall Square, and decorated guns and carriages, having them prominently display advertising banners.

==== Exhibitor advertising ====
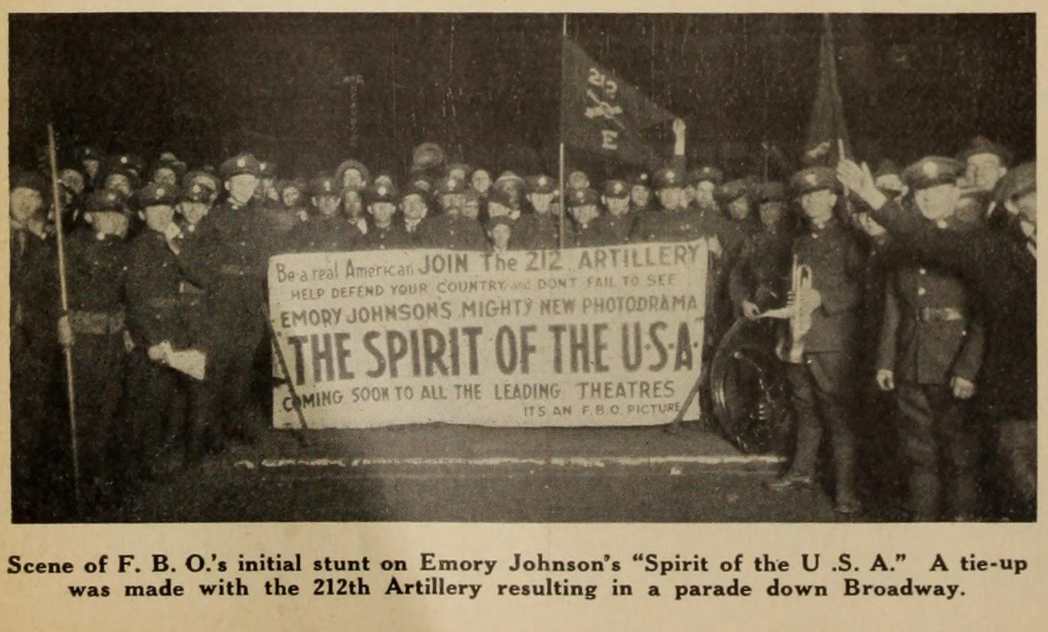
News photo of the march down Broadway

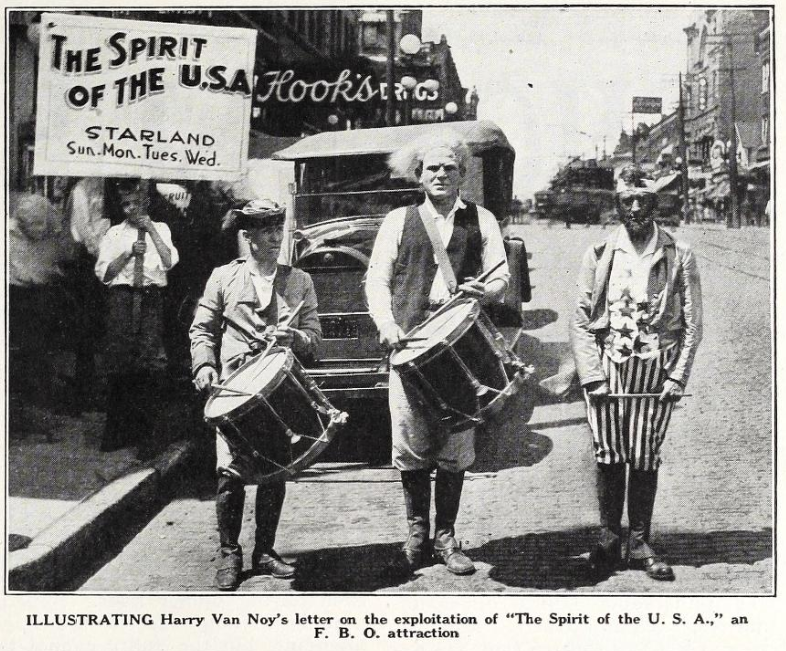
photo of an advertising stunt in Indiana

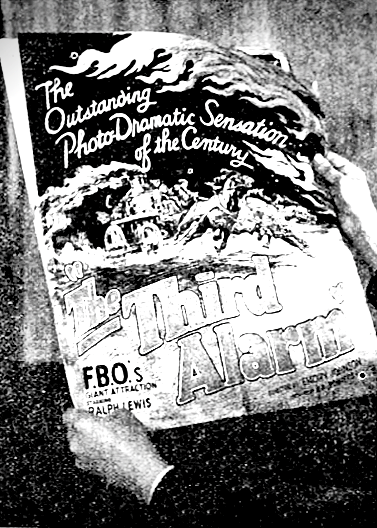
Example campaign book

===== Campaign Book =====
FBO offered a Campaign Book to movie theater owners, with detailed advice on advertising, publicity, and promotion. The press book explained how connections were established with the New York National Guard, followed by tie-ins with the National Guard units in Philadelphia and Los Angeles. To expand the film's reach, a collaborative effort with the Elks, American Legion and other fraternal organizations was suggested. The press book also listed eight merchandising window cards to attract audiences and advertise related products. FBO also introduced a new pictorial service with eight pictures related to the Army, Navy, and Marines. The theater imprint could be added to these images, offering personalized branding and advertisement opportunities.

===== Chicago =====
At the movie premiere in New York, FBO enlisted Babe Ruth to join the militia. Theaters in Chicago also wanted a spectacle for promotion. The film was slated to debut at the Castle Theatre on South State Street at West Madison. On the opening day, the Cubs baseball team, mounted on horseback, paraded down State Street escorted by eight horse-drawn 75 mm guns and a regiment of soldiers. The procession concluded at the Castle Theatre. The crowd watched the Cubs team join the 122nd field artillery, taking an oath of allegiance in front of the theatre.

=== Reviews ===
==== Critical response ====
- Upon its world premiere in New York City, the film received one less-than-flattering review in the May 21, 1924, issue of The New York Times.
  "This is not a production suited to the heart of New York . . It may possibly have an appeal and dull provincial points . . .Tombstone, Arizona might like it for one show. In fact, the distinct feature of this effort is that it is a cure for insomnia, with a title to attract the persons to a place where is being shown. So far as we are concerned, this picture makes an afternoon seem like a week. This photographer has done his bit, but hokum drowned out all interest and makes the whole affair like a disappointing Circus sideshow."
- In the May 31, 1924, issue of the Moving Picture World, Reviewer C. S. Sewell observed:
  "Emory Johnson is a producer who works on the theory that a majority of patrons want heart-interest melodrama that strikes home, built around characters and incidents of every-day life with which we are all familiar. His newest picture of this type for F.B.O. is The Spirit of the U. S. A. and he has exemplified the title in a story of the world war in the person of a lad who embodies the best ideals of American manhood. . . is a picture that the highbrows will probably frown on as filled with theatrical hokum; nevertheless, we believe it is a picture that the masses will enjoy, one that will get under the skin of a large number of patrons and which will appeal to lovers of honest heart-interest melodrama."

==== Audience response ====
FBO was a film production and distribution company that had a strong focus on catering to small-town venues. They served this market melodramas, Western action pictures, and comedic shorts. Unlike major Hollywood studios, FBO owned no movie theaters and depended on movie house proprietors renting their films. Similar to other independent studios, FBO's financial success was intricately tied to the willingness of these movie house owners to rent their films, as it was through these rentals that FBO could generate profits.

Prior to leasing a film, picture house owners had a significant concern: ensuring that the film had the potential to be a profitable venture in their specific location. To aid them in making informed financial decisions, these proprietors would subscribe to trade journals. These publications provided valuable assistance by featuring critical reviews, attendance, revenue, and opinions from other managers. By reading these assessments, picture house owners could determine the viability of a film deciding whether it was likely to attract audiences and generate the desired financial returns in their locale.

The film received a positive reception from the audience, especially in the small towns that constituted FBO's primary target audience. While the response from larger venues was not as enthusiastic, they were neither disappointed nor displeased with the attendance. These are the brief published observations from movie house owners.

- L. E. Gray, Met Theatre Drayton, North Dakota, population 637
  This is absolutely the best picture I have played for the last three years. Mary Carr is the most mature actor I have seen, and it's natural and the kind you might see in almost any modern home at some time in their lives. I was the first to play this in North Dakota, and I can safely recommend it to any exhibitor. Play it. Brother; it's good! Eight reels.
- Cragin & Pike, Majestic Theatre Las Vegas, Nevada, population 2,304

One of the poorest pictures we have ever shown and our patrons have been telling us so ever since we used it. The story is absolute drivel, and the war scenes are only hashes, nothing like as claimed in the press book. Our advice is to lay off this picture at any price. We dislike to knock, but when something like this is put over we feel it our duty to let brother exhibitors know our opinion.

- Unknown, Moon Theatre Omaha, Nebraska, population 191,061
  The highbrow picture fans will probably claim that the production is filled with Hokum. Without question, there is a great deal of Hokum, but the work has been conceived with sincerity. We believe that it will appeal to those who are keen about heart interest melodramas.
- Lastly, showing a review from New York City's The Evening World dated May 21, 1924, and quoted in the May 1924 issue of The Film Daily:
  It is another one of those mother pictures. But when Mary Carr plays the mother, and Johnny Walker plays the son, there is bound to be a lot of good acting and barrels of tears.

== Preservation status ==
Many silent-era films did not survive for reasons as explained on this Wikipedia page. (Note: Film is history. With every foot of film lost, we lose a link to our culture, the world around us, each other, and ourselves. – Martin Scorsese, filmmaker, director NFPF Board A report by Library of Congress film historian and archivist David Pierce estimates that: around 75% of original silent-era films have perished; 14% of the 10,919 silent films released by major studios exist in their original 35 mm or other formats; 11% survive only in full-length foreign versions or film formats of lesser image quality.) The posting on the Library of Congress Performing Arts Database lists this film as "No holdings located in archives." The complete LOC record is shown here. (Note: The complete Library of Congress record reads as follows: Title = The Spirit Of The U. S. A [motion picture] Director = Johnson, Emory Dates Issued = December 5, 1924 Physical Description = 9 reels; 8,312 ft. Copyright Claimant = Emory Johnson Productions Registration number = Lp20290 Studio = R-C/FBO Completeness = abridgement e28_16_9_library: K Note = Kodascope Holdings = No holdings located in archives.)

A 15-minute excerpt The Spirit of the U.S.A. is available for free viewing and download at the Internet Archive. The same film segment is also available on YouTube.

== Gallery ==
Cast Members and Director
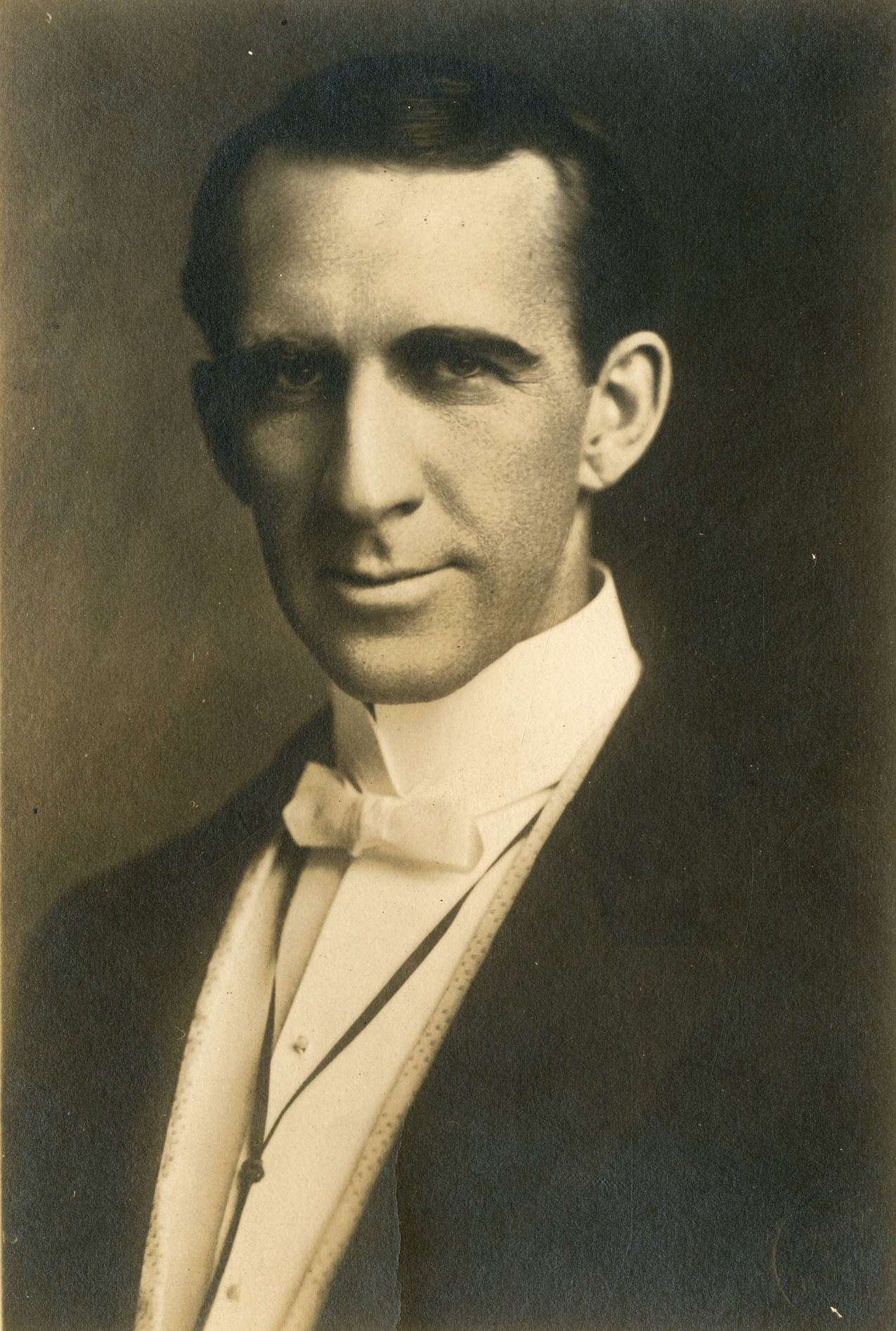
Carl Stockdale
Thomas Gains

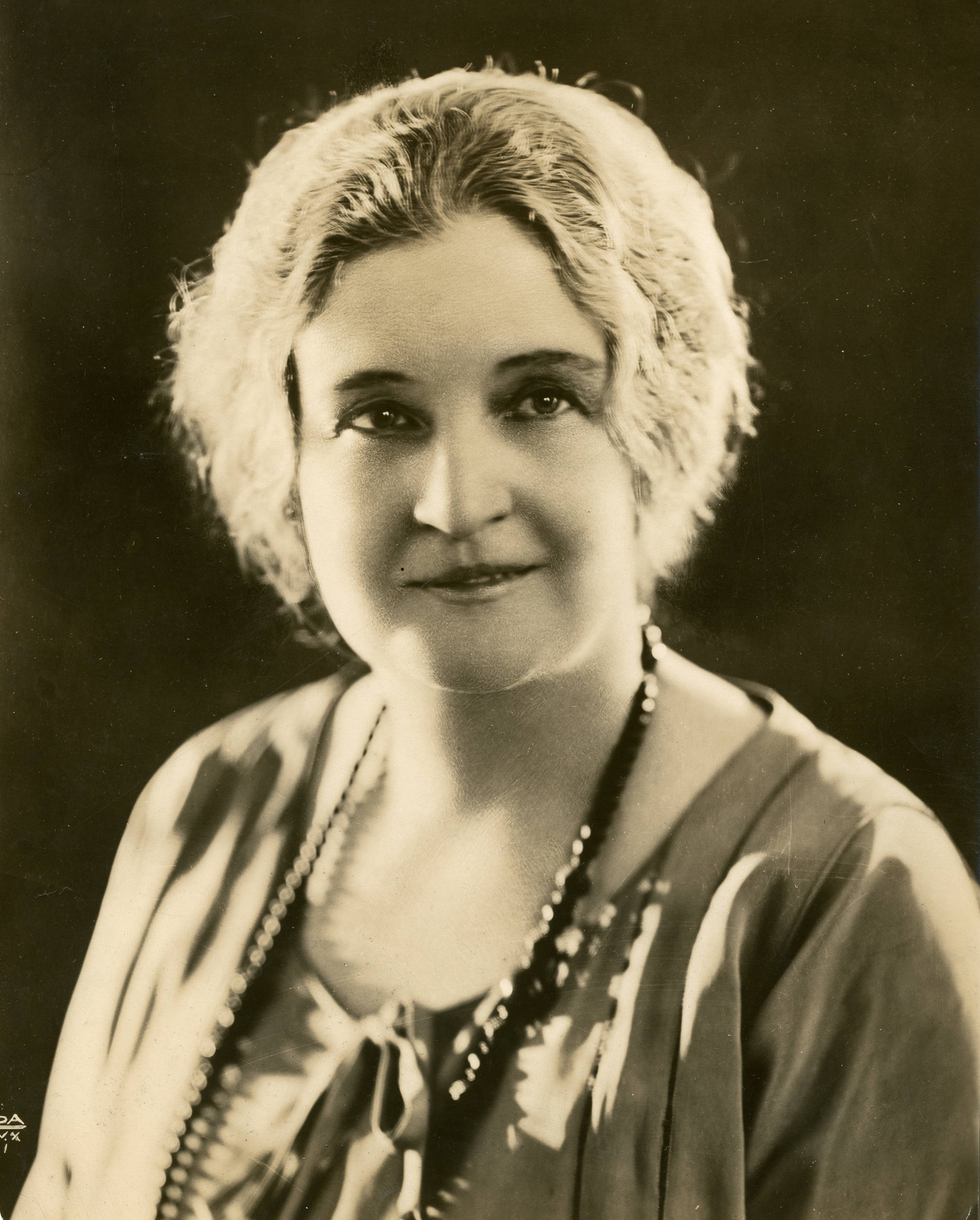
Mary Carr
Mary Gains

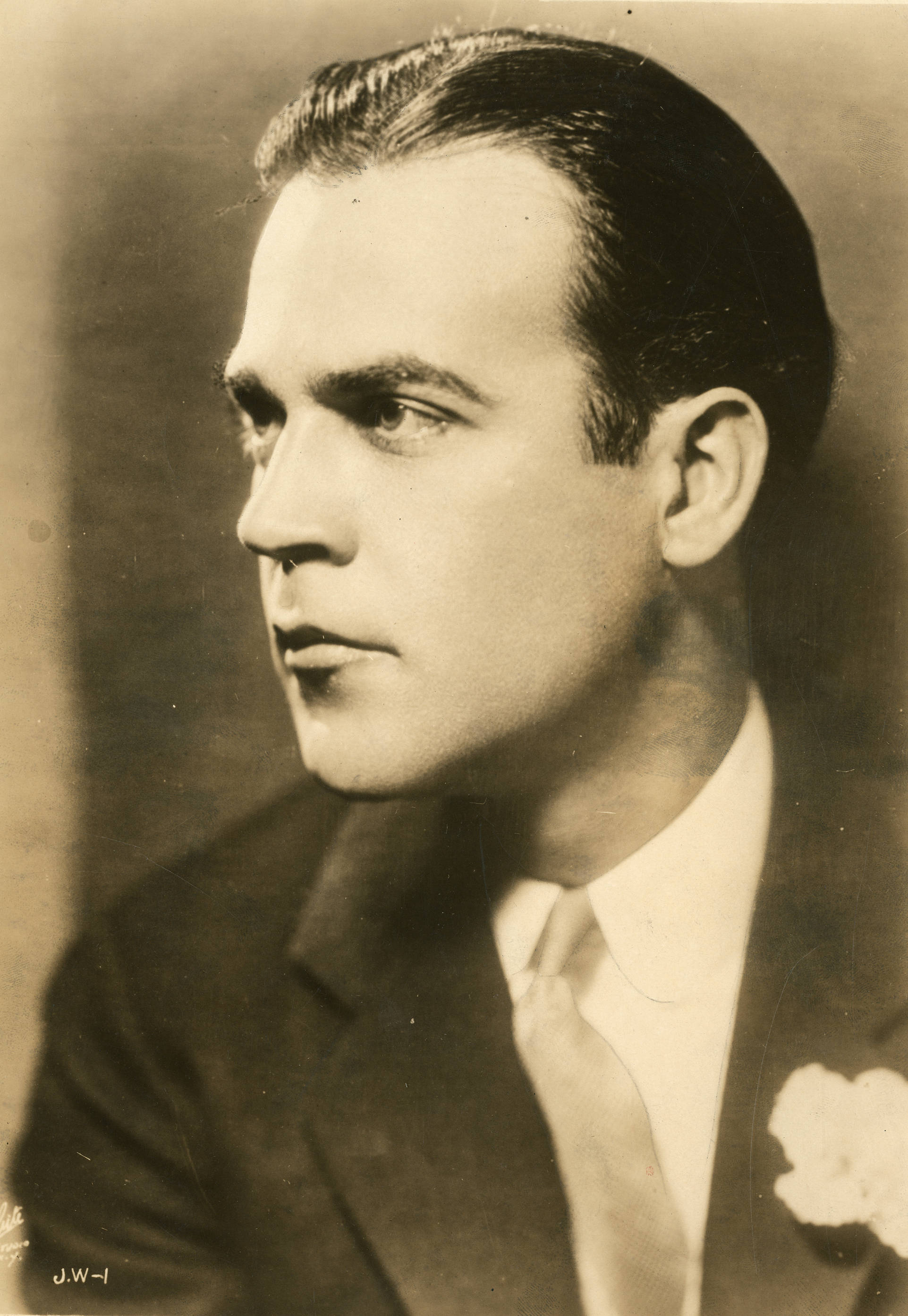
Johnnie Walker
Johnnie Gains

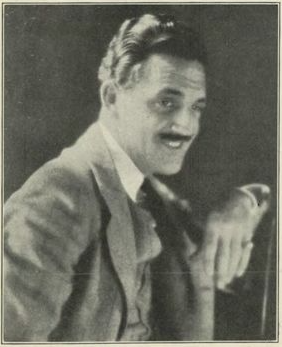
Cuyler Supplee
Silas Gains

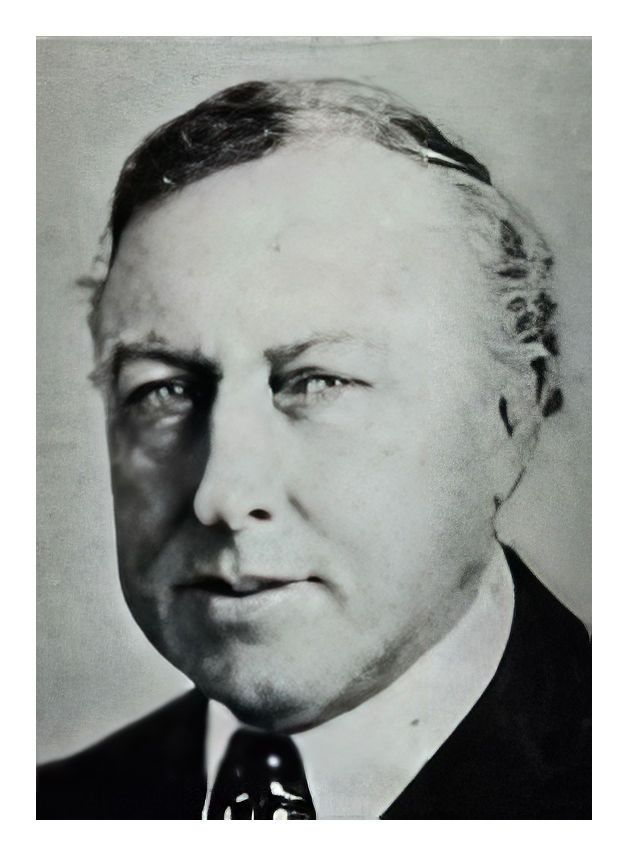
Mark Fenton
John J. Burrows

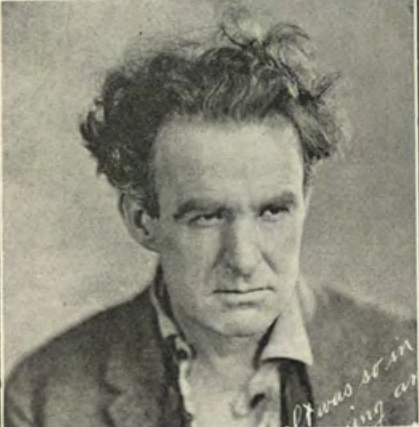
David Kirby
Jim Fuller

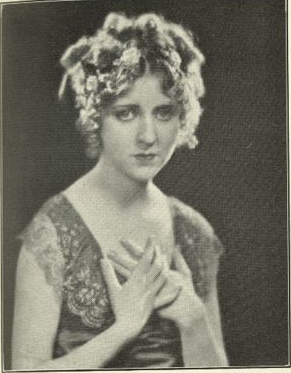
Gloria Grey
Gretchen Schultz

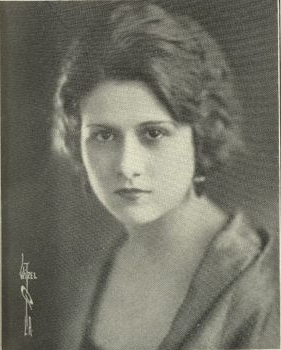
Rosemary Cooper
Zelda Burrows

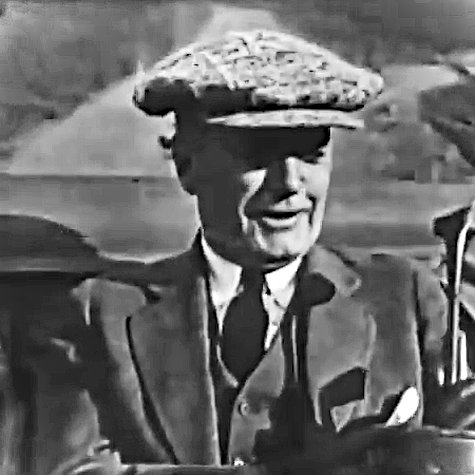
Richard Morris
Grandpa Gains

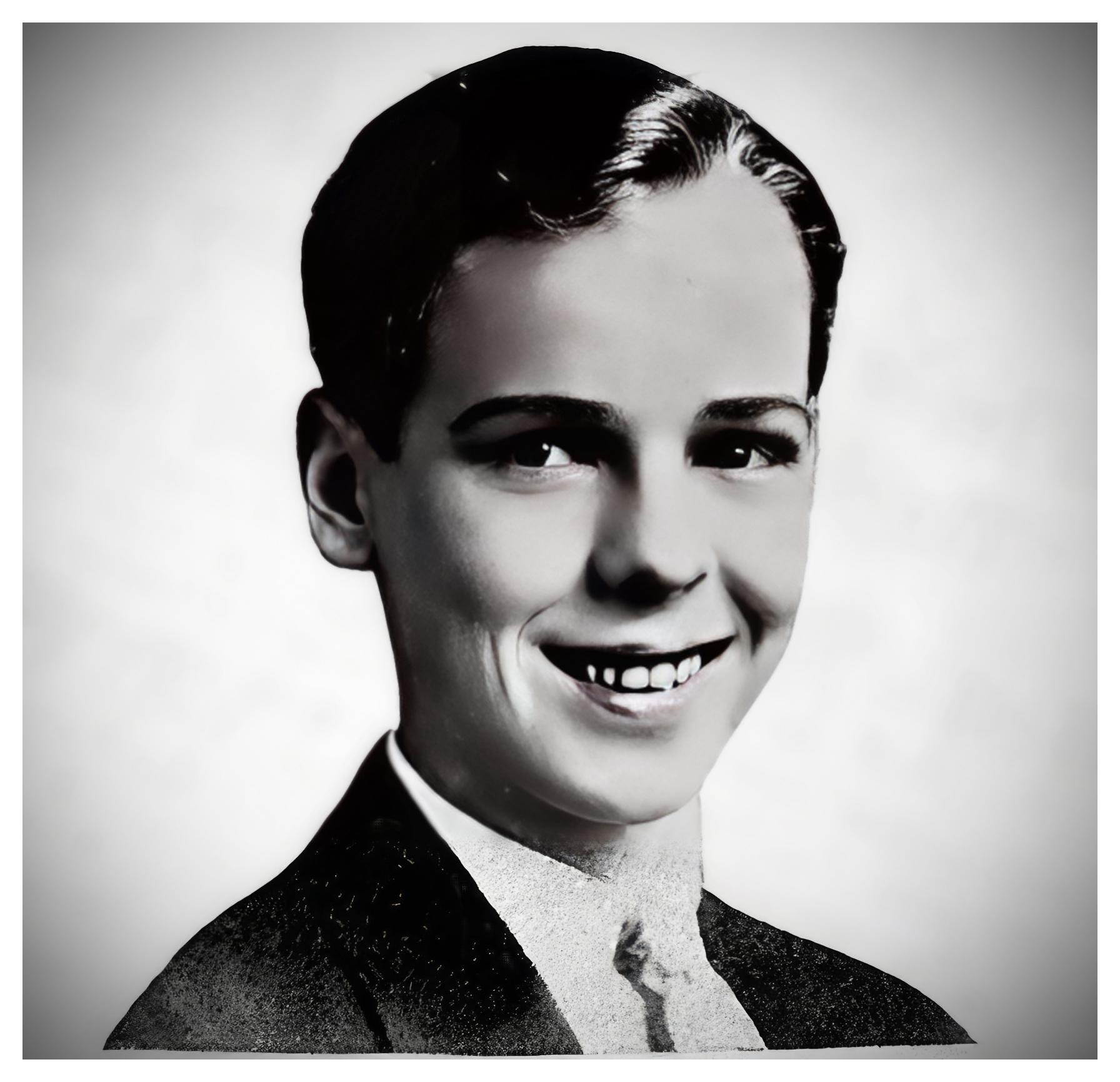
AI-upscaled photograph of Newton House
Little Silas Gains

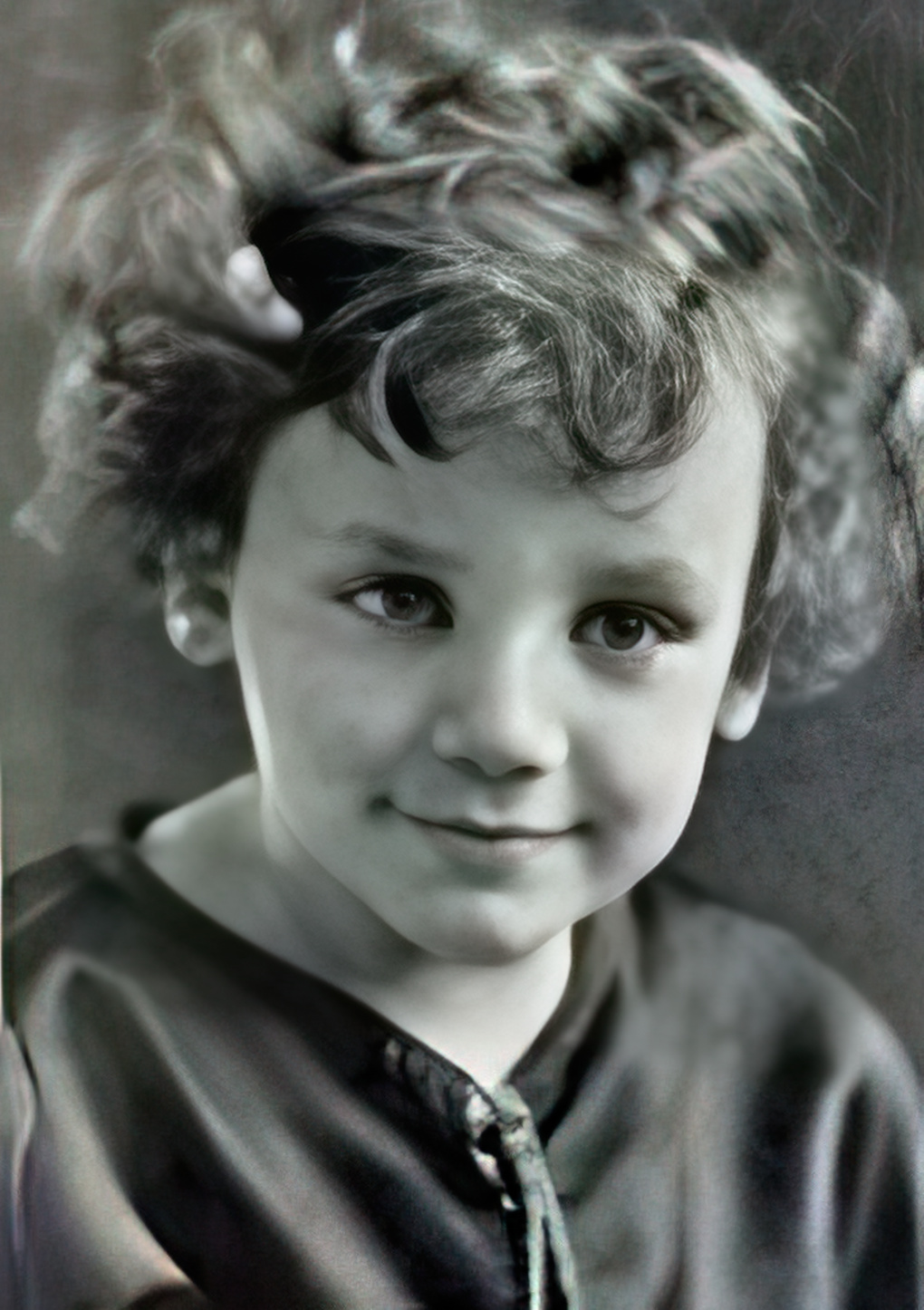
AI-upscaled photograph of Dicky Brandon
Little Johnnie Gains

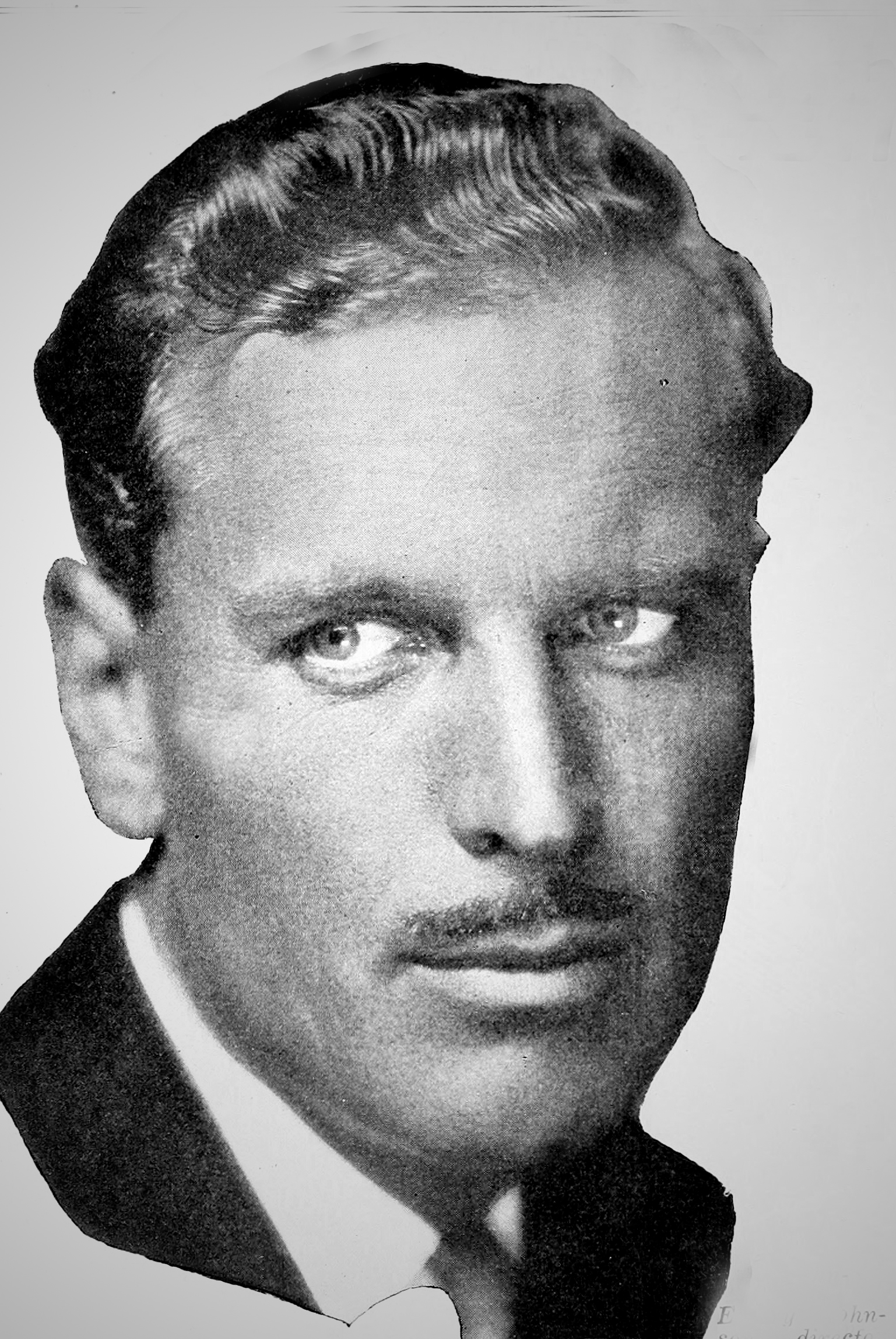
Emory Johnson
Director

== Bibliography ==
- Goodwin, Doris Kearns (1991). The Fitzgeralds and the Kennedys: An American Saga. Manhattan, New York City: St. Martin's Press. p. 932. ISBN 978-0-312-06354-2. "Book Two: The Kennedys (1915-1940) - Chapter 20 This is a gold mine"
- Lasky, B. (1989). RKO: The Biggest Little Major of Them All. Roundtable Pub. ISBN 978-0-915677-41-2.
- Katchmer, George A. (2002). A Biographical Dictionary of Silent Film Western Actors and Actresses. Jefferson, North Carolina: McFarland & Company, Inc. ISBN 978-0-7864-4693-3.
- Slide, Anthony (2000). Nitrate Won't Wait: History of Film Preservation in the United States. McFarland. p. 5. ISBN 978-0786408368. "It is often claimed that 75 percent of all American silent films are gone and 50 percent of all films made prior to 1950 are lost, but such figures, as archivists admit in private, were thought up on the spur of the moment, without statistical information to back them up."
- Hughes, Laurence A (1924). The truth about the movies - By the Stars. Huntington Park, California: Hollywood, Calif., Hollywood publishers, inc. p. 522.

== American Film Institute cast links ==
- Johnny Walker
- Mary Carr
- Carl Stockdale
- Mark Fenton
- William S Hoose
- Gloria Grey
- Rosemary Cooper
- David Kirby
- Cuyler Supplee
- Dicky Brandon
- Newton House
- Richard Morris
- Emory Johnson
- Emilie Johnson
