= Rosson =

Rosson is a surname. Notable people with the surname include:

- Helene Rosson (1897–1985), American silent film actress
- Peggy Rosson (born 1935), American politician
- Queenie Rosson (1889–1978), American silent film actress
- Richard Rosson (1893–1953), American film director and actor

== See also ==
- Rosson House
