= Youth's Endearing Charm =

1916 film by William C. Dowlan

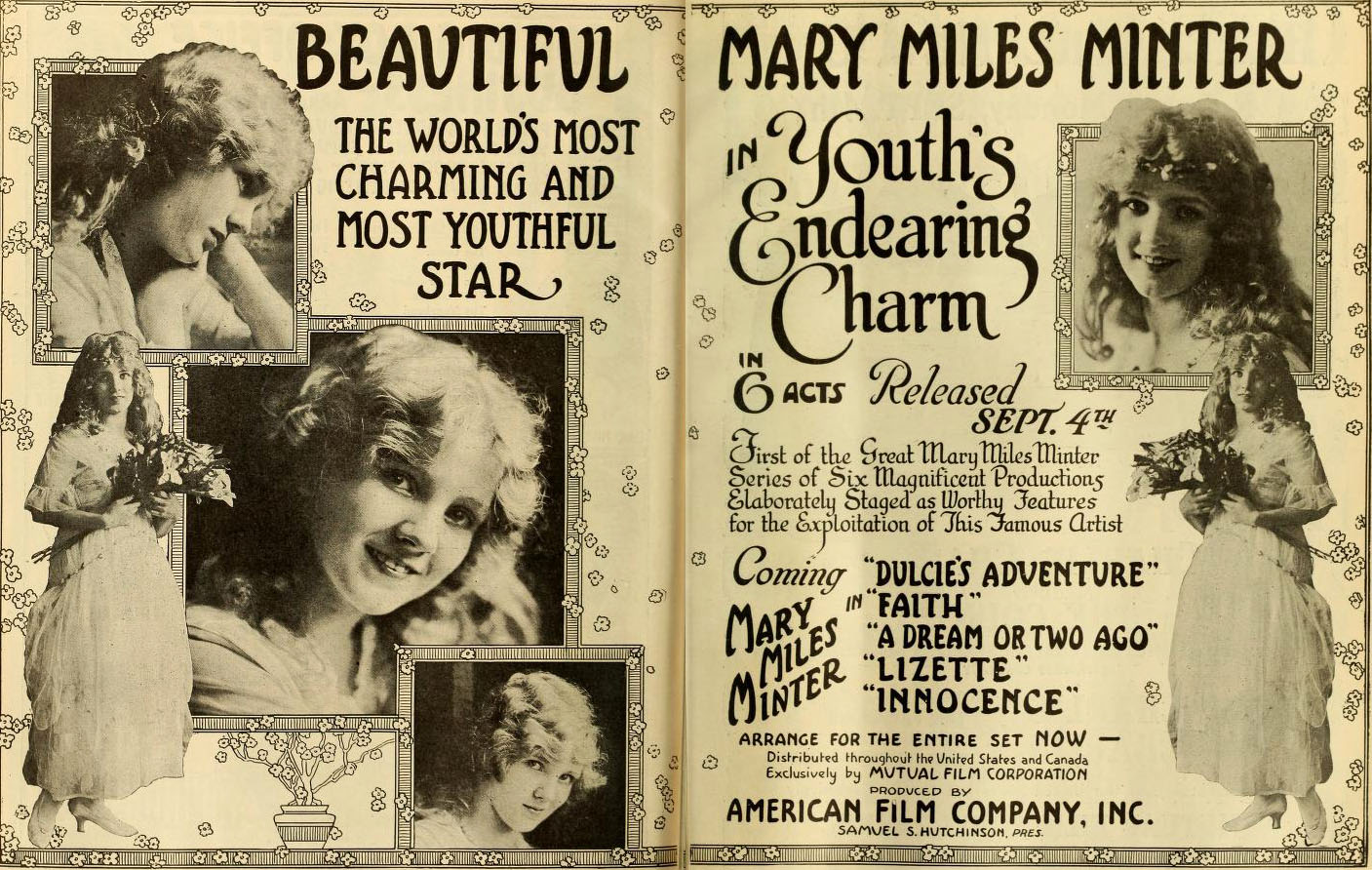
- Directed by: William C. Dowlan
- Written by: J. Edward Hungerford
- Based on: Youth's Endearing Charm by Maibelle Heikes Justice
- Starring: Mary Miles Minter; Wallace MacDonald; Harry von Meter
- Cinematography: David Abel
- Production company: American Film Manufacturing Company
- Distributed by: Mutual Film
- Release date: September 4, 1916
- Running time: 6 reels
- Country: United States
- Language: Silent (English intertitles)

Youth's Endearing Charm (also known as Youth's Melting Pot) is a 1916 American silent drama film directed by William C. Dowlan. The film stars Mary Miles Minter, Wallace MacDonald, and Harry von Meter. The script for the film was adapted by J. Edward Hungerford from a novel of the same name written by Maibelle Heikes Justice. This was Minter's first film with Mutual Film, having previously been with Metro Pictures. A print is preserved at the Library of Congress.

== Plot ==
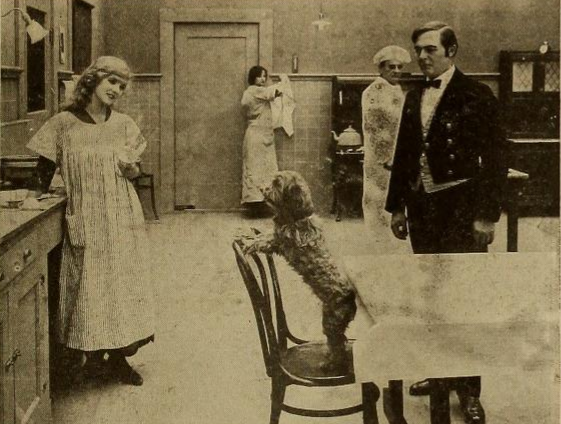
Mary Miles Minter and "Zippy" the dog, in a scene from "Youth's Endearing Charm"

As described in film magazines, orphan Mary Wade is taken in by Farmer Jenkins and his wife. After two years of drudgery and ill-treatment, she runs away to the city along with her faithful dog Zippy. With no means of supporting herself, Mary poses as a blind beggar. This ruse lands her in jail, where a fellow custodian is Harry Disbrow, a wealthy young man who has been arrested for drunkenness.

Harry is rapidly released, and, having taken an interest in Mary, he finds her employment in his parents' home as a servant. He rapidly falls in love with her, but he has been engaged to Maud Horton, the daughter of his father's business partner. At a ball given to celebrate this engagement, Mary decides to don a dress of Maud's and attend; Mrs. Disbrow passes off the girl as her niece.

It transpires that Maud's father, George Horton, has been systematically robbing from the family, including stealing a bundle of securities from a safe during the ball. When the theft is discovered, a fight ensues between Horton and Mr. Disbrow. When the pocketbook containing the securities falls from Horton's pocket, Mary takes the opportunity to seize the securities, and also to break a vase upon Horton's head. In gratitude for her bravery and for saving the family's fortunes, the Disbrows approve of Mary's marriage to Harry.

== Cast ==
- Mary Miles Minter as Mary Wade
- Wallace MacDonald as Harry Disbrow
- Harry von Meter as John Disbrow
- Gertrude Le Brandt as Mrs. Disbrow
- Al Ferguson as Joe Jenkins
- Bessie Banks as Mrs. Jenkins
- Harvey Clark as George Horton
- Margaret Nichols as Maud Horton
