= The Man Who Would Not Die =

The Man Who Would Not Die may refer to:

- The Man Who Would Not Die (film), a 1916 silent film
- The Man Who Would Not Die (album), a 2008 album by Blaze Bayley
