= The Devil's Assistant =

1917 film directed by Harry A. Pollard

- Directed by: Harry A. Pollard
- Written by: J. Edward Hungerford
- Produced by: Pollard Picture Plays Co.
- Starring: Margarita Fischer
- Distributed by: Mutual Film Company
- Release date: April 2, 1917
- Running time: 2 reels, 23 minutes (originally 5 reels)
- Country: USA
- Languages: Silent film English intertitles

The Devil's Assistant is a silent drama film directed by Harry A. Pollard and starring his wife Margarita Fischer. It was based on a scenario written by J. Edward Hungerford and distributed through the Mutual Film Company. The film includes a notable horror sequence comparing narcotic addiction to the tortures of hell.

== Plot ==
Doctor Lorenz (Monroe Salisbury) is in love with Marta (Margarita Fischer), but she spurns him and marries John Lane (Jack Mower), leaving him bitter and resentful. A year later, Marta and John's baby died, and Dr. Lorenz is called in to treat Marta for exhaustion. Determined to steal her away from John, Lorenz decides to treat Marta with narcotics in the hopes of seducing her. Aided by Marion (Kathleen Kirkham), a friend who is in love with John, Dr. Lorenz drives Marta to addiction and dependence on him and convinces her to leave her husband. When they take refuge from a storm in a mountain hut, Lorenz attempts to take advantage of Marta, who is in the throes of drug-induced delirium. In a red-tinted film sequence, Marta sees herself transported to Hades, with hellish visions of torture in “The Devil’s Crucible,” including skeletons on horseback, three-headed dogs, and winged demons with pitchforks. Meanwhile, before Lorenz is able to rape Marta, lightning strikes the hut and they are buried in the ruins. Dr. Lorenz is killed, but John arrives to find Marta alive and carries her away to rebuild their life together.

== Cast ==
- Margarita Fischer - Marta
- Monroe Salisbury - Dr. Lorenz
- Kathleen Kirkham - Marion Dane
- Jack Mower - John Lane
- Joe Harris - Butler

== Preservation ==
Originally produced as a five reel feature, The Devil's Assistant was cut down to two for a reissue and that shorter cut is all that has survived. The incomplete 35mm print is held by the USC School of Cinematic Arts Hugh M. Hefner Moving Image Archive.
