= William S. Hooser =

American actor

William Samuel Hooser (born 1837) was a brief early American silent film actor.

Hooser only starred in three films: two in 1916 in The Highest Bid and The Return, in which he worked with actresses such as Charlotte Burton. In 1924, he played the character of Otto Schulz in The Spirit of the USA.

He was from Litchfield, Illinois.
