= The Grind (1915 film) =

1915 film

- Directed by: Joe De Grasse
- Written by: Ida May Park
- Starring: Lon Chaney; Pauline Bush
- Distributed by: Universal Pictures
- Release date: April 11, 1915
- Running time: 3 reels (30 minutes)
- Country: United States
- Language: Silent with English intertitles

The Grind is a 1915 American silent drama film directed by Joe De Grasse, written by Ida May Park (De Grasse's wife), and featuring Lon Chaney, Pauline Bush and Queenie Rosson. The film is now considered to be lost. The film was released in England as On The Verge of Sin. A still exists showing Lon Chaney in the role of Henry Leslie.

== Plot ==
Jean Chesney has always been like a mother to her two younger sisters, Rita and Lily. Jean works as an extra girl at the local theatre, forcing her to leave her sisters alone in the evenings. Henry Leslie, Rita's employer, has been making advances toward her even though he is married, while his son Bob Leslie drunkenly forces his attentions on Jean who slaps his face. Bob frequently sends Jean flowers, which she consistently rejects. Lily is taken ill, and Henry Leslie promises Rita that he can do much to help her sick sister. Later, Jean returns home to find Rita gone; Lily reluctantly confides that Rita has gone for a ride in the country with Henry Leslie. Bob learns that his mother has suffered a major heart attack, and desperately searches around for his father to bring him the news.

In the country, Leslie is just about to force himself on an inebriated Rita, when Jean arrives to stop him just in time. Bob arrives and, seeing his father with Jean, assumes his dad was cheating with Jean, and not Rita. Bob tells his father the grave news and they hurry home only to find that Mrs. Leslie has died.

Bob becomes depressed and takes to drinking to drown his sorrows. One night, while in a drunken stupor, he is beaten, robbed, and dumped in an alley. Jean stumbles over Bob's unconscious body on her way home from the theatre, and helps the man to her house. Rita tells Bob the whole story of how it was really she who was cheating with his father, and not Jean. Bob is thrilled to learn that Jean is the good wholesome girl he had always believed her to be. Bob begs Jean for her forgiveness, and she gives him a smile, his first sign of hope that they may be able to kindle a relationship.

== Cast ==
- Lon Chaney as Henry Leslie
- Ray Gallagher as Bob Leslie (Henry's son)
- Pauline Bush as Jean Chesney
- Queenie Rosson as Rita Chesney
- Helene Rosson as Lily Chesney (credited as "Helen Rosson")
- Unknown (?) as Mrs. Leslie

== Reception ==
"A strong three-reel offering written by Ida May Park...This has all been done before, but in this particular story it is worked out very naturally and many of the situations are strong. It is all interesting and the sordid moments are not drawn out too long. Jean's love story turns out well and the close is very effective." ---Moving Picture World.

"Such an offering is sure of keeping the interest up all the time and the subject is handled in such a delicate manner that the picture is suitable for exhibition in any theatre including those of neighborhood and family patronage." --- Motion Picture News
