= Sold at Auction =

1917 film by Sherwood MacDonald

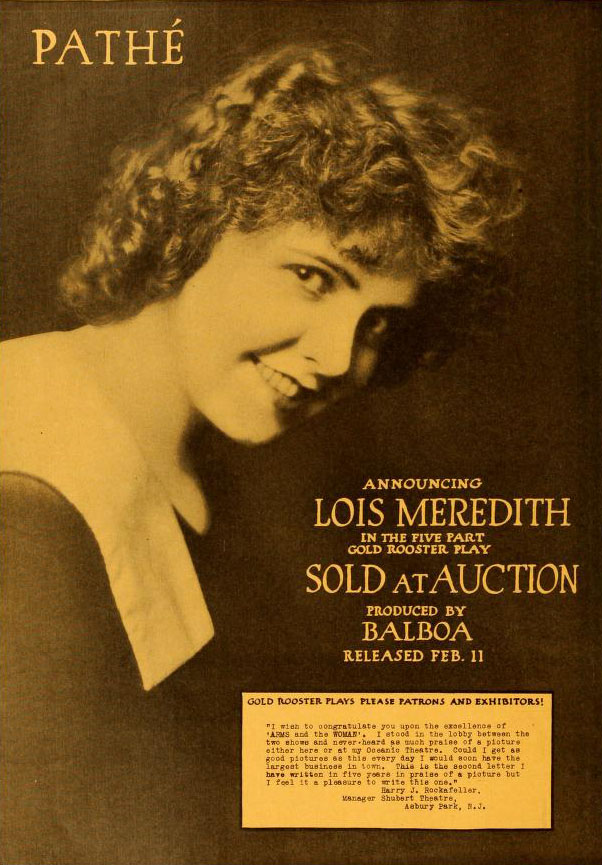
- Directed by: Sherwood MacDonald
- Written by: Daniel F. Whitcomb
- Produced by: E.D. Horkheimer; H.M. Horkheimer
- Starring: Lois Meredith; William Conklin; Marguerite Nichols
- Production company: Balboa Amusement Producing Company
- Distributed by: Pathé Exchange
- Release date: February 11, 1917
- Running time: 5 reels
- Country: United States
- Language: Silent (English intertitles)

Sold at Auction is a 1917 American silent drama film directed by Sherwood MacDonald and starring Lois Meredith, William Conklin, and Marguerite Nichols.

== Cast ==
- Lois Meredith as Nan
- William Conklin as Richard Stanley
- Marguerite Nichols as Helen
- Frank Mayo as Hal Norris
- Charles Dudley as William Raynor
- Lucy Blake as Raynor's Sister

== Censorship ==
The film industry created the National Association of the Motion Picture Industry in 1916 in an effort to preempt censorship by states and municipalities, and it used a list of subjects called the "Thirteen Points" which film plots were to avoid. Sold at Auction, with its white slavery plot line, is an example of a film that clearly violated the Thirteen Points and yet was still distributed. Since the NAMPI was ineffective, it was replaced in 1922.

== Preservation ==
Sold at Auction is currently presumed lost. In February of 2021, the film was cited by the National Film Preservation Board on their Lost U.S. Silent Feature Films list.

== Bibliography ==
- Langman, Larry. American Film Cycles: The Silent Era. Greenwood Publishing, 1998. ISBN 0-313-30657-5
