= The Love Hermit =

1916 film by Jack Prescott

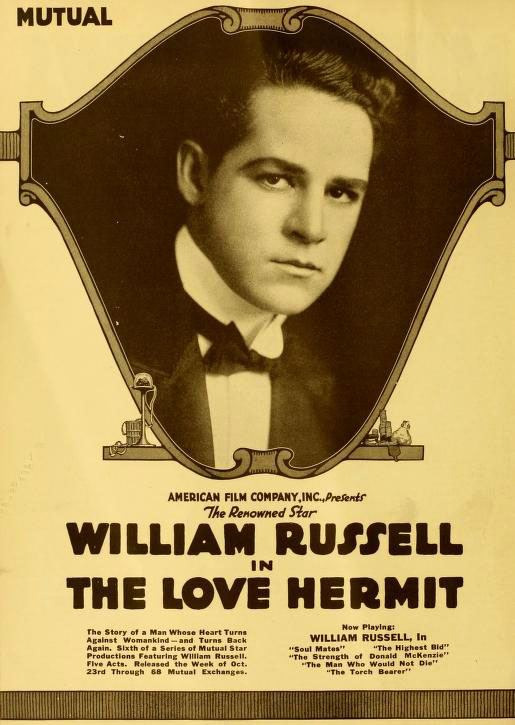
- Directed by: Jack Prescott
- Written by: Clarke Irvine (Story)
- Starring: William Russell; Charlotte Burton
- Distributed by: Mutual Film
- Release date: October 26, 1916
- Country: United States
- Languages: Silent film English intertitles

The Love Hermit is a 1916 American silent drama film directed by Jack Prescott. The film stars William Russell and Charlotte Burton.

== Cast ==
- William Russell as Tom Weston
- Charlotte Burton as Marie Bolton
- Harry von Meter as James Bolton
- William Stowell as Jack Hillman
- Queenie Rosson as Grace Hamilton
- Ashton Dearholt in Undetermined Role

== Preservation ==
With no holdings located in archives, The Love Hermit is considered a lost film.
