= That Gal of Burke's =

That Gal of Burke's (aka:Daughter of the Ranch)
- Directed by: Frank Borzage
- Produced by: American Film Manufacturing Company
- Starring: Ann Little
- Distributed by: Mutual Film
- Release date: July 28, 1916
- Running time: 2 reels
- Country: USA
- Language: Silent..English titles

That Gal of Burke's is a lost 1916 silent short film directed by Frank Borzage and starring Ann Little. It was released by the Mutual Film Company.

== Cast ==
- Ann Little - Tommie Burke (credited as Anna Little)
- Jack Richardson - Arnold Blake
- Frank Borzage - Charles Percival
- Dick La Reno - Mr. Burke
- Gordona Bennet - Burke's sister (as Gordona Bennett)
- Queenie Rosson - Mabel, Burke's niece
