= The Thoroughbred (1916 film) =

1916 film by Charles Bartlett

- Directed by: Charles Bartlett
- Starring: Charlotte Burton; Jack Prescott
- Distributed by: Mutual Film
- Release date: January 17, 1916
- Country: United States
- Languages: Silent film English intertitles

The Thoroughbred is a lost 1916 American silent drama film directed by Charles Bartlett, as his first feature length film starring Charlotte Burton and Jack Prescott. It should not be confused with the identically titled Triangle Film production The Thoroughbred of the same year.

== Cast ==
- Charlotte Burton as Angela Earle
- Jack Prescott as Tom Cook
- William Russell as Kelso Hamilton
- Roy Stewart as George Carewe
- Lizette Thorne as Jessie Cook
- George Fisher as Reverend Thomas Hayden

== Reception ==
The film was commended for its action scenes with critic Harvey F. Thew for Motion Picture News praised both the staging and camera work in particular. However, Wid's Film and Film Folk found the directing style to be old school, lamenting the "failure of the director to use modern methods in his placing of the camera..." and found it much akin to the average melodrama films from earlier in the decade.

== Preservation ==
With no holdings located in archives, The Thoroughbred is considered a lost film.
