= The Highest Bid =

1916 film by William Russell

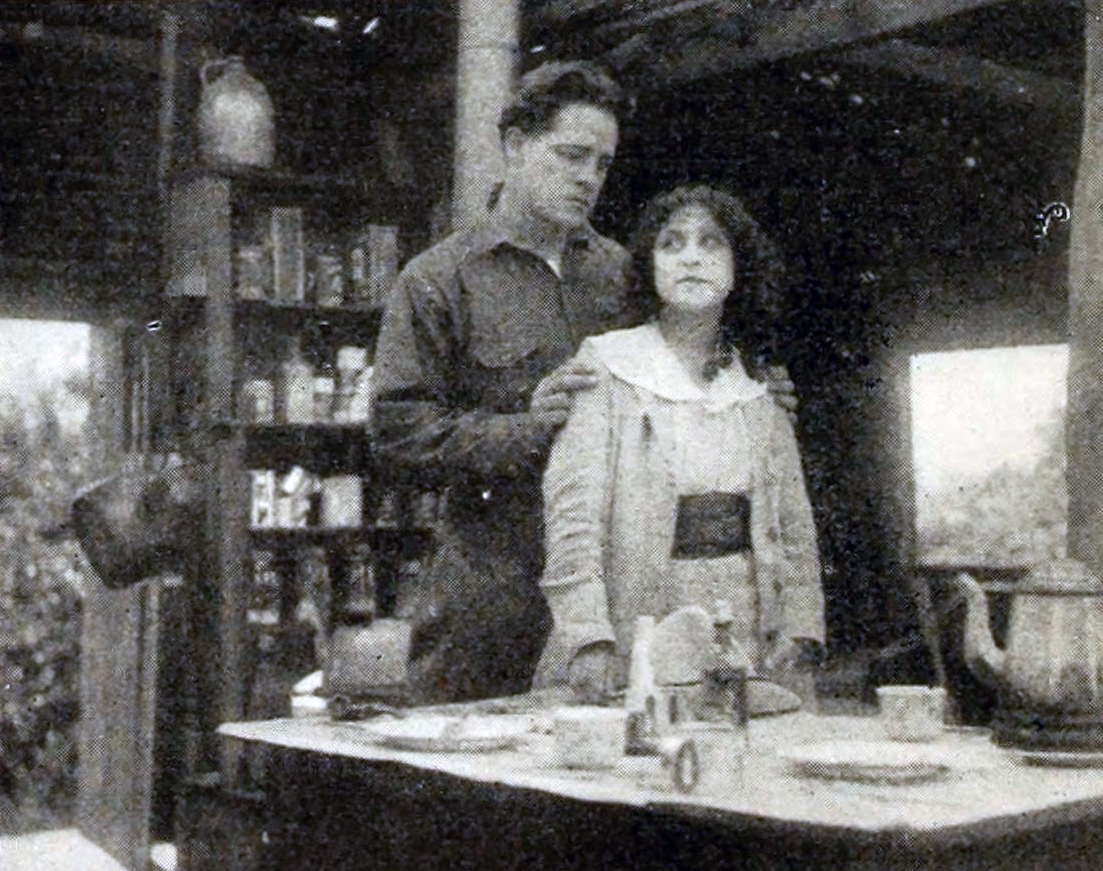
- Directed by: William Russell
- Written by: Arthur Henry Gooden (Story); J. Edward Hungerford (Scenario)
- Starring: William Russell; Charlotte Burton
- Distributed by: Mutual Film
- Release date: July 16, 1916
- Country: United States
- Languages: Silent film English intertitles

The Highest Bid is a 1916 American silent drama film directed by and starring William Russell and Charlotte Burton.

== Cast ==
- Charlotte Burton as Elsie Burleigh
- William Russell as Oliver Strong
- William S. Hooser as Uncle Jerry
- Harry Keenan as Addison Grey
- Marie Van Tassell as Elsie's mother
