= The Spirit of Adventure =

1915 film

- Directed by: B. Reeves Eason
- Written by: J. Edward Hungerford
- Starring: Jack Richardson
- Distributed by: Mutual Film
- Release date: September 1, 1915
- Country: United States
- Languages: Silent; English intertitles

The Spirit of Adventure is a 1915 American short film directed by B. Reeves Eason.

== Cast ==
- Vivian Rich
- Jack Richardson
- Walter Spencer
