= Harry Keenan =

American actor

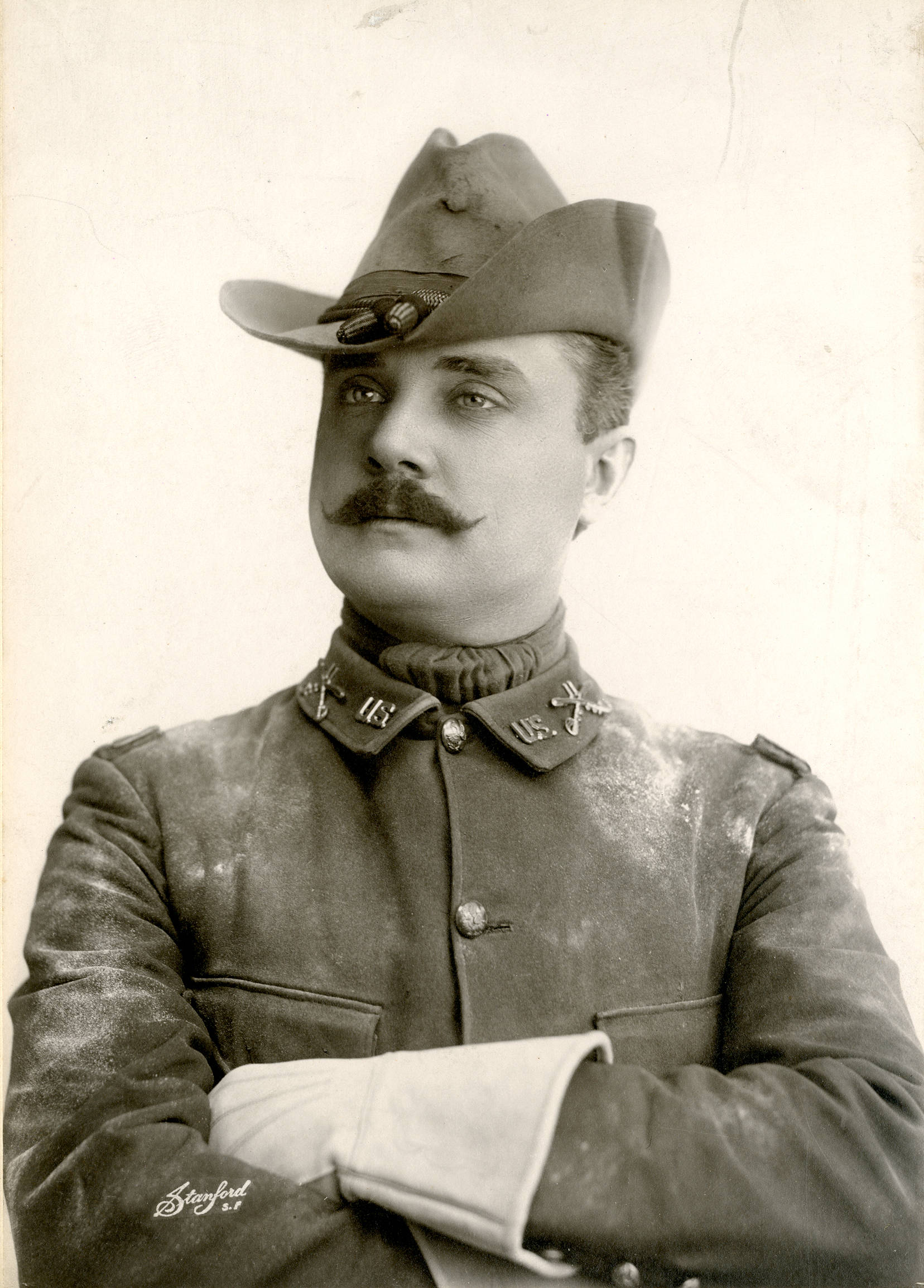
- Keenan in 1904
- Born: Harry George Keenan; June 15, 1867; Richmond, Indiana, U.S.
- Died: April 18, 1944 (aged 76); Santa Ana, California, U.S.
- Resting place: Winthrop Cemetery, Winthrop, Massachusetts, U.S.
- Occupation: Actor
- Years active: 1912–1921

Harry George Keenan (June 15, 1867, Richmond, Indiana – April 18, 1944, Santa Ana, California) was an early American silent film actor.

He starred in about 45 silent films mostly shot between 1912 and 1916, including The Highest Bid, with actresses such as Charlotte Burton.

== Selected filmography ==
- The Winged Idol (1915)
- The Strength of Donald McKenzie (1916)
- The Torch Bearer (1916)
