= Marguerite Nichols =

American silent film actress

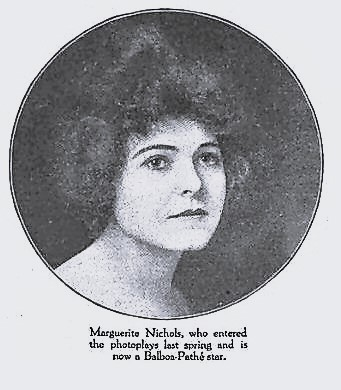
- The Green Book Magazine, January 1916
- Born: Marguerite Olive Nichols; August 3, 1891; Los Angeles, California, US
- Died: March 17, 1941 (aged 49); Los Angeles, California, US
- Resting place: Calvary Cemetery
- Occupation: Actress
- Years active: 1915–1918
- Spouse: Hal Roach (m. 1915)
- Children: Hal Roach, Jr.; Margaret Roach
- Relatives: Robert Livingston (former-son-in-law)

Marguerite Olive Nichols (August 3, 1891 – March 17, 1941) was an American silent film actress. She starred in 21 films between 1915 and 1918. Actress Norma Nichols was her sister.

== Marriage and death ==
Nichols was born in Los Angeles, California. She married comedy film producer Hal Roach in 1916. (He survived her by more than a half-century, dying at age 100 in 1992). They had two children, Hal Jr. and Margaret Roach. She died from pneumonia on March 17, 1941, in Good Samaritan Hospital in Los Angeles.

== Filmography ==
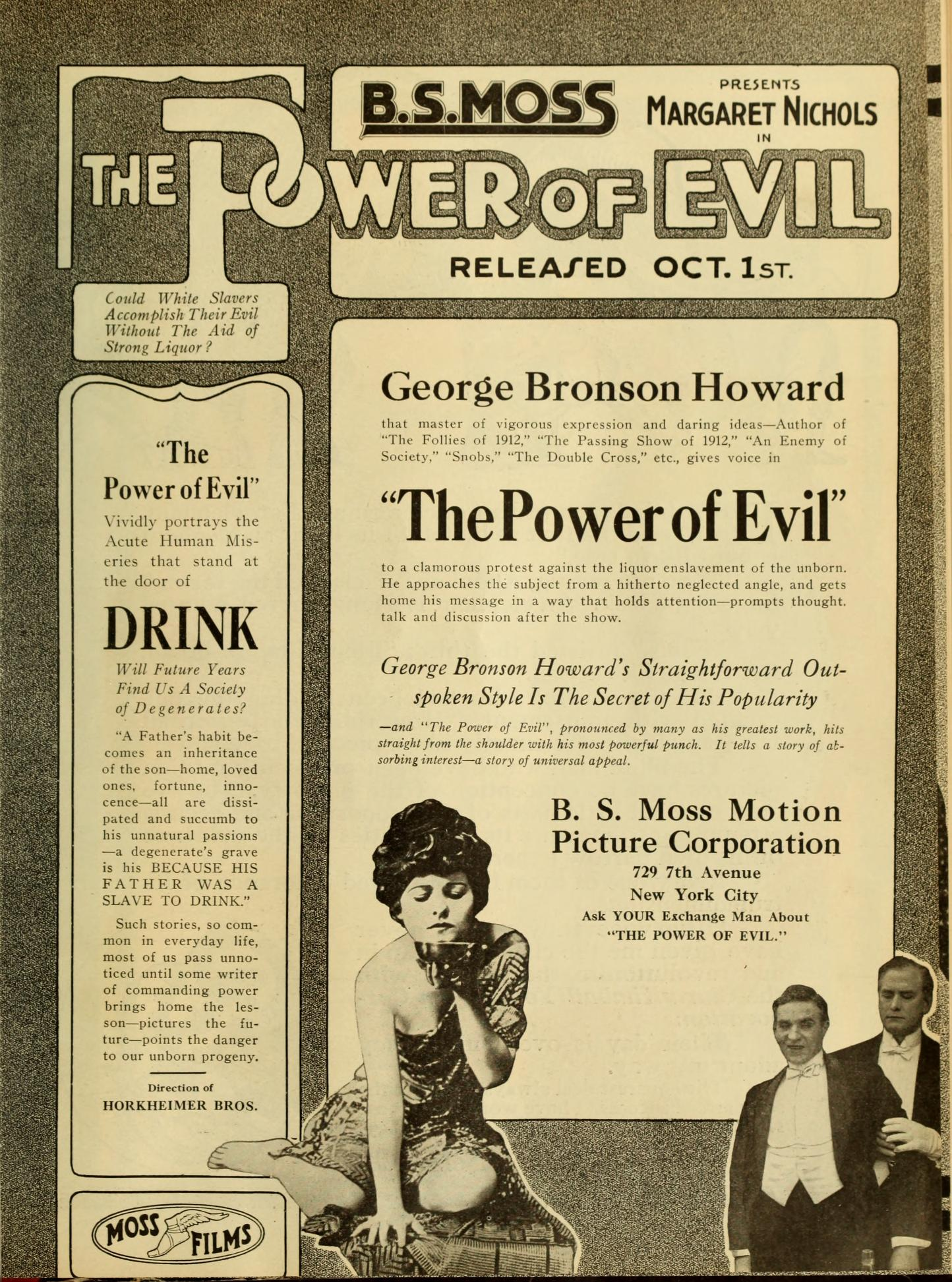
The Power of Evil (1916)

- The Quality of Forgiveness (1915)
- Beulah (1915)
- The Maid of the Wild (1915)
- Counsel for the Defense (1915)
- Big Brother (1916)
- Little Mary Sunshine (1916) .... Sylvia Sanford
- The Witch of the Mountains (1916)
- The Reclamation (1916) .... Edith Phelan
- Jack (1916) (as Margaret Nichols)
- The Oath of Hate (1916) (as Margaret Nichols)
- Pay Dirt (1916) .... Kate Gardner
- The Matrimonial Martyr (1916) .... Phyllis Burnham
- Dust (1916) (as Margaret Nichols) .... Mina
- The Dancer (1916)
- The Strength of Donald McKenzie (1916) (as Margaret Nichols)
- Faith's Reward (1916)
- Youth's Endearing Charm (1916) (as Margaret Nichols) .... Maud Horton
- The Torch Bearer (1916) (as Margaret Nichols)
- The Power of Evil (1916) .... Laurine Manners
- Sold at Auction (1917) .... Helen
- When Baby Forgot (1917) (as Margaret Nichols) .... Janet Watson
- The Girl o' Dreams (1918) (as Margaret Nichols) .... Mrs. Leonard
