= Marie Van Tassell =

American actress (1871–1946)

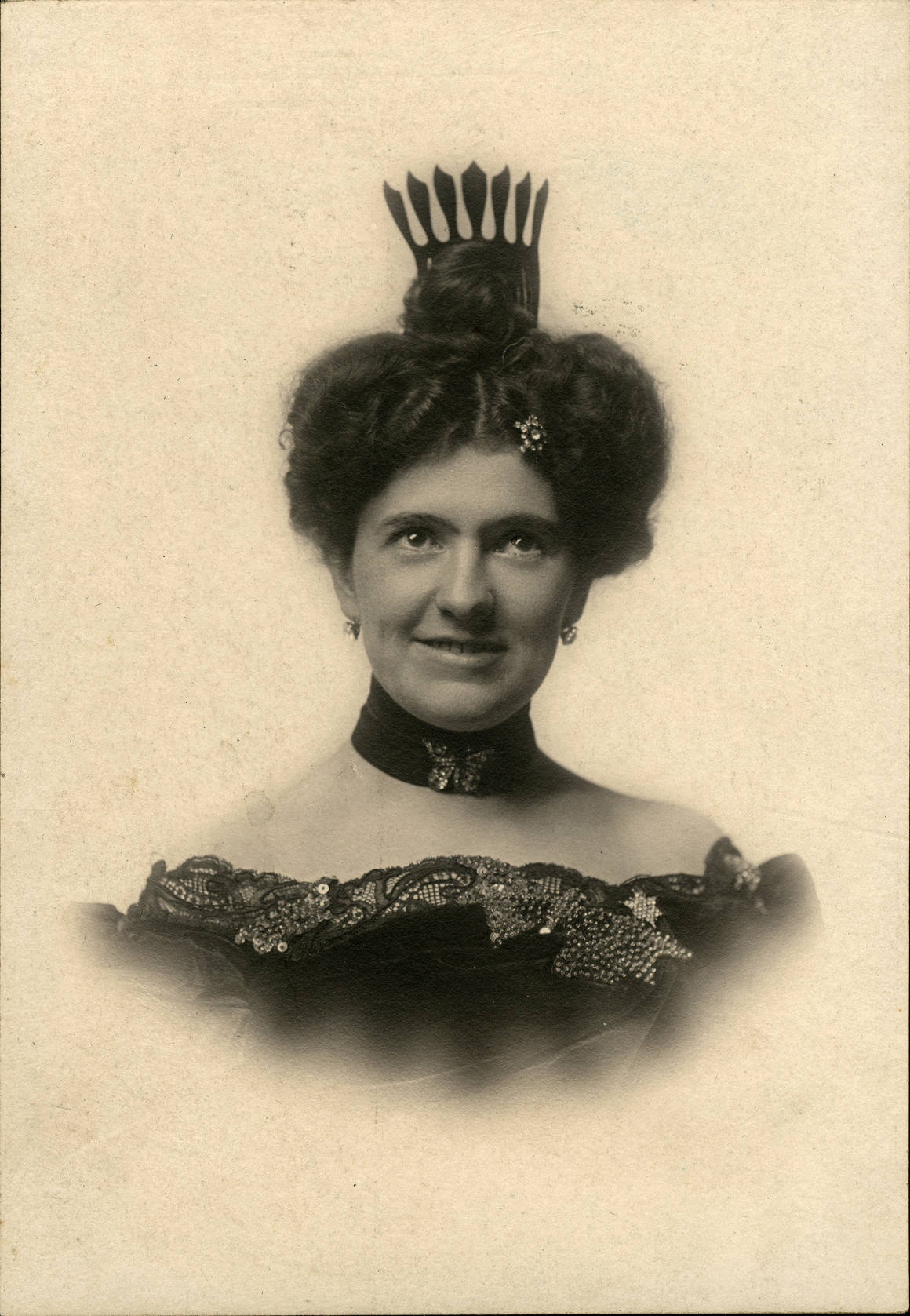
- Van Tassell in 1909
- Born: April 6, 1871; Little Falls, New York, U.S.
- Died: January 22, 1946 (aged 74); Oakland, California, U.S.
- Occupations: Theater and film actress
- Spouse: Jack King (died)

Marie Van Tassell (April 6, 1871 – January 22, 1946) was an American stage and silent film actress.

== Early life ==
Marie Van Tassell was born on April 6, 1871, in Little Falls, New York. From an early age, she performed in the theater.

== Career ==
In 1914, Van Tassell starred as Mrs. Collins in Fine Feathers with the All Star Players Company. She began acting in film in 1915. She first starred in The Rose Garden Husband for Universal Pictures. In 1918, she was loaned to Flying A. After acting, she worked for the Works Progress Administration and directed the KLX radio program Alameda City School of the Air. She then helped train young people in acting.

== Personal life ==
According to a 1914 piece in the Seattle Times, Van Tassell married five times. She married Jack King, a circus performer. He predeceased her. Towards the end of her life, she lived with Marie King on 25th Avenue in Oakland, California.

Van Tassell died on January 22, 1946, aged 72, at a hospital in Oakland.

== Filmography ==
- The Rose Garden Husband (1915)
- The Dynast
- The Gentle Intruder
- Curly (1915) as Mrs. Brewster (credited as Marie Van Tassel)
- Billy Van Deusen's Shadow (1916) as Mrs. Smudge (credited as Marie Van Tassel)
- Johnny's Jumble (1916) as Aunt
- True Nobility (1916) as Mrs. Burton
- April (1916) as Mrs. De Voe
- The Counterfeit Earl (1916) as Mrs. Belknap
- The Trail of the Thief (1916) (credited as Marie Van Tassel)
- The Highest Bid (1916) as Elsie's mother
- Purity (1916) as Truth
- The Torch Bearer (1916) as Mrs. Huntley-Knox
- Dulcie's Adventure (1916) as Aunt Netta
- Peck o' Pickles (1916) as Caroline Pickett
- The Only Road (1918) as Rosa Lopez
- The Mask (1918) as Miss Prim (credited as Marie Van Tassel)
- Sue of the South (1919) as Margaret Darwin
- Deep Waters (1920) as Barzella Busteed
