= Queenie Rosson =

American actress

- Born: Ethel Rosson; 24 February 1889; Groton, Massachusetts, US
- Died: 19 December 1978 (aged 89); Palm Beach, Florida, US
- Resting place: Arlington National Cemetery
- Other names: Queenie Rosson, Ethel R. Daly
- Occupation: American silent film actress
- Years active: 1914–1916
- Relatives: Arthur Rosson (brother); Harold Rosson (brother); Richard Rosson (brother); Vera Sisson (sister-in-law); Jean Harlow (sister-in-law); Nina Byron (sister-in-law)

Queenie Rosson Daly (February 24, 1889 – December 19, 1978), born Ethel Rosson, was an early American silent film actress, and one of the family of Rosson siblings who were active in the film industry from the 1910s into the 1950s.

== Early life ==
Rosson was born in Groton, Massachusetts, the daughter of Arthur Richard Rosson and Helene Rochfort Rosson. Her older brother Arthur H. Rosson was a film director; her younger brother Harold Rosson (Hal) was a cinematographer, and another brother, Richard Rosson (Dick), was an actor and director. Her sister Helene was an actress, and another sister, Gladys, was Cecil B. DeMille's longtime personal secretary. Through her brothers' marriages, she was the sister-in-law of actresses Vera Sisson, Nina Byron, and (briefly) Jean Harlow.

== Career ==
Rosson appeared in over twenty silent films between 1914 and 1916 in films, such as The Love Hermit (1916), working with actors such as Charlotte Burton and Harry von Meter. She and her sister Helene Rosson co-starred in Let There Be Light (1915), and she appeared with her brother Dick in A Trunk an' Trouble (1916). The Rosson sisters were among the young film stars known to wear bathing suits at the beach in Santa Barbara, where the American Mutual film studios were located.

== Personal life ==
Rosson married Lt. Col. Joseph James Daly, a decorated World War I veteran, in 1917. Although she retired from the film business when she married, the Dalys continued to be active in Hollywood social circles. Her husband died in 1960. She died in 1978, at the age of 89, in Palm Beach, Florida. Her grave is with her husband's, in Arlington National Cemetery.

== Filmography ==
- The Love Hermit (1916)
- Matchin' Jim (1916)
- The Gambler's Lost Love (1916)
- That Gal of Burke's (1916)
- The Quicksands of Deceit (1916)
- The Demon of Fear (1916)
- The Gulf Between (1916)
- Curlew Corliss (1916)
- With a Life at Stake (1916) (reissued as The Bronco Buster's Bargain)
- Billy Van Deusen's Muddle (1916)
- A Trunk an' Trouble (1916)
- The Laird o' Knees (1916)
- The Broken Cross (1916)
- Water Stuff (1916) (also known as Buck Parvin #6: Water Stuff)
- Let There Be Light (1915)
- Hearts and Clubs (1915)
- Where Ignorance Is Bliss (1915)
- Nothing Ever Happens Right (1915)
- The Grind (1915) (also known as On the Verge of Sin)
- Fares, Please! (1915)
- The Barnstormers (1914)
- The Patchwork Girl of Oz (1914) (uncredited)
- His Wife's Family (1914)
