= Jack Prescott =

American actor

Jack Prescott (c.1880–1959) was an early American silent film actor and director.

Prescott starred in 19 films as an actor, between the end of 1914 and 1918, working with actors such as Charlotte Burton in films such as The Thoroughbred (1916). He also directed five short silent films in 1916 and retired from film in 1918.

Prescott directed the films The Man Who Would Not Die and The Strength of Donald McKenzie in 1916.

== Filmography ==
- Cyclone Higgins, D.D. (1918) (as John Prescott) .... Jasper Stone
- The Strength of Donald McKenzie (1916) (as John Prescott) .... Pierre
- The Man from Manhattan (1916) .... Squire Benjamin Barton
- Overalls (1916) .... Buck Finnegan
- Margy of the Foothills (1916) .... Pete
- Powder (1916)
- The Silent Trail (1916)
- The Thoroughbred (1916) .... Tom Cook
- The Keeper of the Flock (1915)
- Martyrs of the Alamo (1915)
- The Idol (1915)
- The Price She Paid (1915)
- A Case of Beans (1915)
- You'll Find Out (1915) (as John Prescott)
- Back of the Shadows (1915)
- Cornelius and the Wild Man (1915)
- The Emigrant's Peril (1915)
- The Greater Power (1915)
- The Key to Yesterday (1914) (as John Prescott) .... Señor Roberto

== Director filmography ==
- The Love Hermit (1916)
- The Torch Bearer (1916)
- The Man Who Would Not Die (1916)
- The Strength of Donald McKenzie (1916)
- Soul Mates (1916)
