= J. Edward Hungerford =

American screenwriter

- Born: February 25, 1883; Missouri USA
- Died: April 25, 1964 (aged 81); Los Angeles, California
- Occupation: Screenwriter
- Years active: 1912 - 1921

J. Edward Hungerford (February 25, 1883 - April 25, 1964) was an American silent film screenwriter.

He wrote the scripts for well over 50 films between 1912 and 1921 such as Youth's Endearing Charm in 1916.

== Selected filmography ==
- The Voice of Warning (1912)
- Susie's New Shoes (1914)
- The Spirit of Adventure (1915)
- Youth's Endearing Charm (1916)
- The Devil's Assistant (1917)
- Crossed Clues (1921)
- The Driftin' Kid (1921)
