= List of American films of 1913 =

More than 56 American feature films and 4,780 short films were released in the year 1913.

Title	Director	Cast	Genre	Notes
The Adventures of Kathlyn	Francis J. Grandon	Kathlyn Williams	Adventure serial	
American Born	Lorimer Johnston	Sydney Ayres, Harry von Meter, Charles Cummings	Drama	
Article 47, L'		William Garwood, Victory Bateman, Howard Davies		
Back to Life	Allan Dwan	J. Warren Kerrigan, Pauline Bush	Drama	
Barney Oldfield's Race for a Life	Mack Sennett	Mack Sennett, Mabel Normand, Ford Sterling, Barney Oldfield	Comedy	
Beau Brummel	James Young	James Young, Clara Kimball Young	Adventure	
The Battle at Elderbush Gulch	D. W. Griffith	Mae Marsh, Lillian Gish	Drama	
Beautiful Bismark		William Garwood	Drama	
Bianca	Robert Thornby	George Cooper		
Bloodhounds of the North	Allan Dwan	Murdock MacQuarrie, Pauline Bush	Drama	
Bob's Baby		Jean Acker	Comedy	
The Caged Bird		William Garwood, Marguerite Snow	Drama	
Calamity Anne's Beauty	Allan Dwan	Louise Lester		
Calamity Anne's Dream	Allan Dwan	Louise Lester		
Calamity Anne's Inheritance	Allan Dwan	Louise Lester		
Calamity Anne's Vanity	Allan Dwan	Louise Lester		
Calamity Anne, Heroine	Allan Dwan	Louise Lester		
Cohen Saves the Flag	Mack Sennett	Ford Sterling, Mabel Normand	Comedy	
The Cub Reporter's Temptation		Earle Foxe, Alice Joyce, Tom Moore	Drama	
Cupid in a Dental Parlor	Henry Lehrman	Fred Mace	Comedy	Unconfirmed appearance of Harold Lloyd
A Desperate Chance	Kenean Buel	Earle Foxe, Alice Hollister, Robert G. Vignola, Helen Lindroth, Miriam Cooper	Drama	
Dr. Jekyll and Mr. Hyde	Herbert Brenon and Carl Laemmle	King Baggot	Horror	
The Evidence of the Film	Lawrence Marston, Edwin Thanhouser	William Garwood, Marie Eline	Crime	
The Face at the Window		Earle Foxe, Irene Boyle, Stuart Holmes	Drama	
The Fire Coward		Earle Foxe, Irene Boyle	Drama	
The Flirt and the Bandit	Lorimer Johnston		Drama	
For the Crown	Lorimer Johnston	Charlotte Burton, Helen Armstrong, J. Warren Kerrigan		
For the Flag	Lorimer Johnston	Charlotte Burton	Drama	
A Forest Romance	Frank Montgomery	Harry von Meter, Mona Darkfeather		
The Game Warden		Earle Foxe, Irene Boyle, Stuart Holmes	Romantic comedy	
The Girl and the Greaser	Allan Dwan	Charlotte Burton, J. Warren Kerrigan, Louise Lester		
The Greater Love	Allan Dwan	Charlotte Burton, Mabel Brown, Edward Coxen	Drama	
His Chum the Baron	Mack Sennett	Ford Sterling	Comedy	Unconfirmed appearance of Harold Lloyd
Hulda of Holland	J. Searle Dawley	Ben F. Wilson, Laura Sawyer, Charles Sutton, Harold Lloyd (uncredited bit)	Drama	
Hurricane in Galveston	King Vidor		Drama	Vidor's directional debut
In the Secret Service	Henry MacRae	Charles Bartlett	Western	
Justice of the Wild	Frank E. Montgomery	Harry von Meter, Mona Darkfeather	Adventure	
Lady Babbie	Oscar A. C. Lund	Barbara Tennant, Oscar A. C. Lund	Drama	
A Little Hero	George Nichols	Mabel Normand, Harold Lloyd	Comedy	
The Mirror	Anthony O'Sullivan	Henry B. Walthall		
Oil and Water	D. W. Griffith	Blanche Sweet, Henry B. Walthall, Lionel Barrymore	Drama	
The Old Monk's Tale	J. Searle Dawley	Ben F. Wilson	Drama	First known appearance of Harold Lloyd
The Proof of the Man		Alexander Gaden, Edna Maison	Drama	
The Quakeress	Raymond B. West	Louise Glaum	Drama	
The Restless Spirit	Allan Dwan	J. Warren Kerrigan, Pauline Bush	Drama	
The Rose of San Juan	Sydney Ayres	Sydney Ayres, Charlotte Burton, Louise Lester	Drama	
Rory o' the Bogs	J. Farrell MacDonald	J. Warren Kerrigan		
Sally Scraggs, Housemaid	Robert Z. Leonard	Robert Z. Leonard, Margarita Fischer	Comedy	
Shadows of the Moulin Rouge	Alice Guy	Fraunie Fraunholz, Claire Whitney	Drama	
The Shoemaker and the Doll		William Garwood	Drama	
The Telephone Girl and the Lady	D. W. Griffith	Mae Marsh, Claire McDowell	Drama	
Three Friends	D. W. Griffith	Henry B. Walthall, Blanche Sweet, Lionel Barrymore	Drama	
The Twelfth Juror	George Lessey	Ben F. Wilson	Drama	
Unto the Third Generation	Harry Solter	Earle Foxe, Florence Lawrence, Matt Moore	Romantic drama	
While There's Life		Charlotte Burton, Jean Durrell	Drama	
Woman's Honor	Allan Dwan	Charlotte Burton, Louise Lester	Drama	

== See also ==
- 1913 in the United States
