= Nicholas Power =

Nicholas Power may refer to:

- Nicholas Mahon Power (1787–1873), Irish nationalist politician
- Nicholas Power (projector manufacturer) (1854–1921), American businessman
