= Headin' North =

Headin' North may refer to:

- Headin' North (1930 film), an American pre-Code Western film
- Headin' North (1921 film), an American silent Western film
