= Phyllis Gordon =

American actress

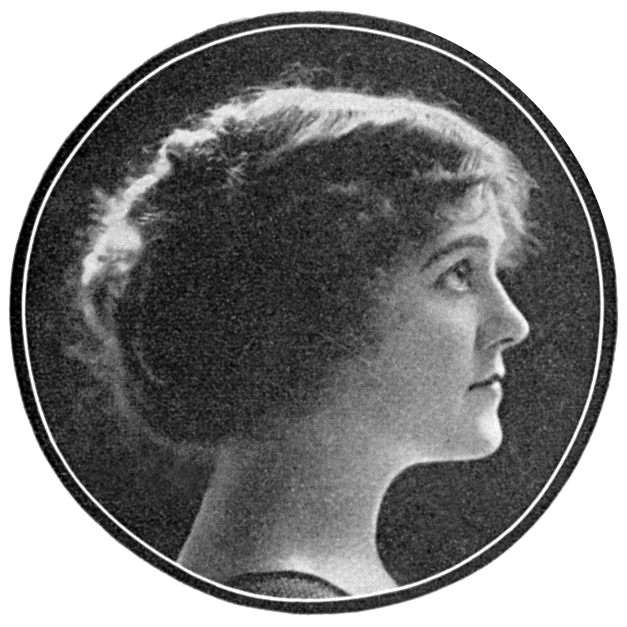
- c. 1912
- Born: October 17, 1889; Suffolk, Virginia, US
- Died: October 16, 1964 (aged 74); Sonoma, California, US
- Occupation: Actress
- Years active: 1911–1941
- Spouse: Eugene Pallette (divorce)

Phyllis Gordon (October 17, 1889 – October 16, 1964) was an American actress. She appeared in 50 silent era and sound films between 1911 and 1941. She was born in Suffolk, Virginia, and died one day before her 75th birthday in Sonoma, California.

Gordon was once notably photographed walking a pet cheetah on a London shopping street. She also shocked people at a restaurant in Davenport, Iowa, when they realized that she had a marmoset in her handbag.

== Early years ==
From the time she was 5 until she was 13, Gordon lived in a convent. "Then," she said, "the money gave out, and I had to go to work." When she was 13, Gordon helped to herd cattle in Oklahoma. In a 1911 interview, she said: "I rode the range astride with the cowboys, curried horses, washed and ironed and did manual labor for a living."

Gordon graduated from Lafayette College with a bachelor's degree in music. Gordon also appeared in vaudeville productions as a comedian and a singer.

== Stage ==
A career-boosting break occurred for Gordon in 1908 when she was a chorus girl in A Knight for a Day. As the understudy for Sallie Fisher, Gordon went on stage when Fisher missed a performance. The next day's issue of The New York Times reported "Miss Gordon's performance was so satisfactory that she is to be engaged for an important role in a new Summer production to be offered at one of Mr. Whitney's theatres in Chicago." Gordon's Broadway credits include Up and Down Broadway (1910).

A review of the production of Dick Whittington, staged in 1910, noted "Phyllis Gordon had the best singing voice, although Louise Dresser was the featured member of the cast."

== Selected filmography ==
- Calamity Anne's Beauty (1913)
- In the Secret Service (1913)
- The Werewolf (1913)
- Another Thin Man (1939)
