= Ethel's Romeos =

1915 film

- Directed by: Edwin Middleton
- Produced by: Gaumont Company
- Starring: Fayette Perry
- Distributed by: Mutual Film
- Release date: 1915
- Running time: 1 reel
- Country: United States
- Languages: Silent film English intertitles

Ethel's Romeos is a 1915 American short comedy film featuring Oliver Hardy.

== Cast ==
- Fayette Perry as Ethel
- Bud Ross as Charlie
- Edward Boulden as Albert
- Herbert Stanley as Frank
- Madge Orlamond as Miss Stimpson
- Oliver Hardy as Jake Stimpson (as Babe Hardy)

== See also ==
- List of American films of 1915
- Oliver Hardy filmography
