= Jessalyn Van Trump =

American actress

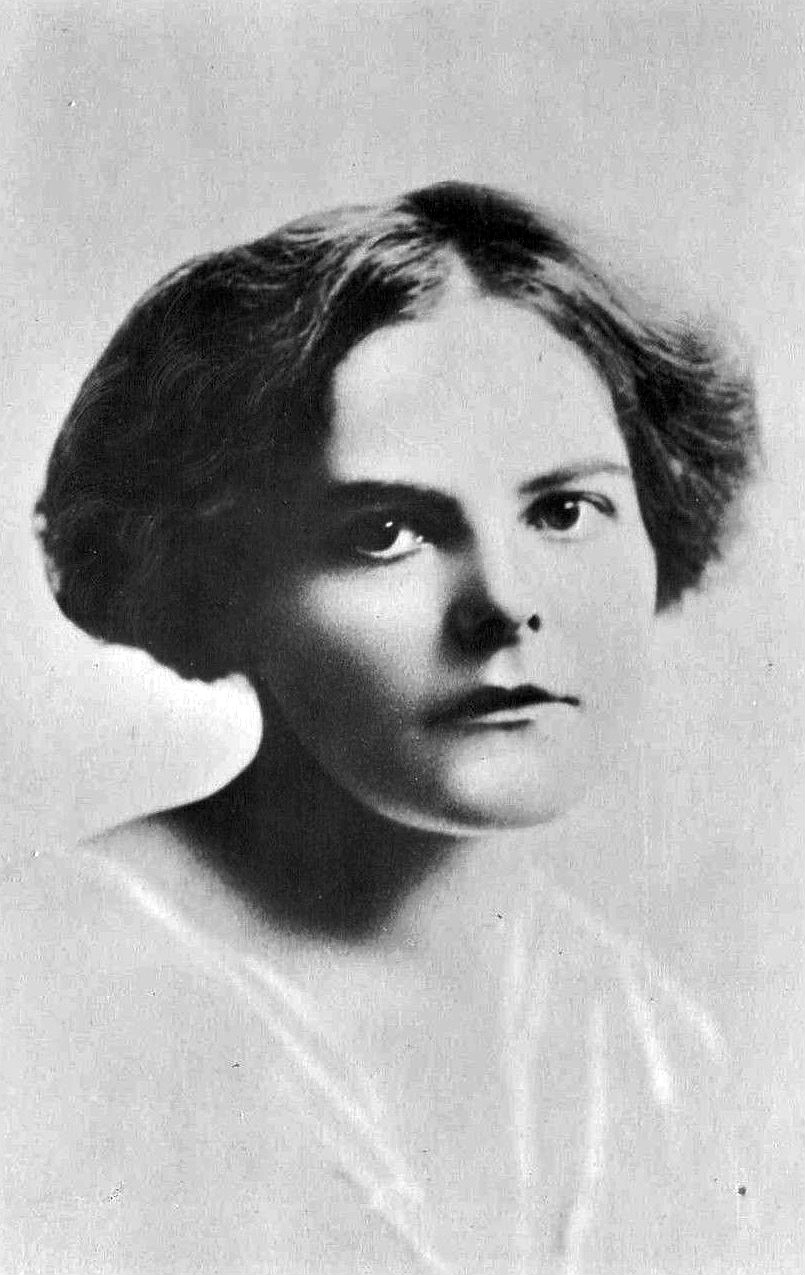
- in 1913
- Born: January 16, 1887; St. Johns, Ohio, U.S.
- Died: May 2, 1939 (aged 52); Hollywood, Los Angeles, California, U.S.
- Occupation: Actress
- Years active: 1911–1928

Jessalyn Van Trump (January 16, 1887 – May 2, 1939) was an American silent film actress.

Van Trump was born in St. Johns, Ohio, but later moved to Hollywood and began acting at age 24. She appeared in over eighty silent films between 1911 and 1928. In the early 1910s, she often appeared opposite Pauline Bush. She died in Hollywood in 1939, at age 52.

== Selected filmography ==
| Year | Film | Role | Notes |
|---|---|---|---|
| 1911 | Alice's Sacrifice | Alice | |
| 1911 | Three Daughters of the West | | |
| 1911 | The Smoke of the .45 | The Younger Sister | |
| 1912 | The Pensioners | The Second Son's Sweetheart | |
| 1912 | The End of the Feud | | |
| 1912 | Geronimo's Last Raid | | |
| 1913 | Calamity Anne's Beauty | | |
| 1913 | Cupid Never Ages | | |
| 1913 | Calamity Anne's Vanity | | |
| 1913 | Calamity Anne's Inheritance | | |
| 1913 | The Restless Spirit | | |
| 1913 | Back to Life | The Charmer | |
| 1913 | Rory o' the Bogs | | |
| 1913 | The Gratitude of Wanda | | |
| 1914 | A Turn of the Cards | | |
| 1914 | The Higher Law | | |
| 1919 | A Day's Pleasure | Woman in the street | Uncredited |
| 1921 | Among Those Present | | Uncredited |
