= Charles Bartlett (film director) =

American film director

- Born: Charles Earl Bartlett; 11 April 1888; Minneapolis, Minnesota
- Died: 26 October 1949 (aged 61); Bradenton, Florida
- Occupation: film director
- Years active: 1912–1927

Tangled Trails

Charles Earl Bartlett (11 April 1888 – 26 October 1949) was an American silent film director.

== Filmography ==
=== As actor ===
1912

  - A Four-Footed Hero: Jack
  - The Massacre of the Fourth Cavalry de Frank Montgomery: Lieutenant Davis
  - The Half-Breed Scout de Frank Montgomery: Jim, un pionnier
  - An Indian Ishmael: Lieutenant
  - A Red Man's Love de Frank Montgomery: Caporal Taylor
  - Trapper Bill, King of Scouts: Bill le Trappeur
  - Star Eyes' Stratagem de Frank Montgomery: Crow Face, un guerrier Sioux
  - The Tattoo: Cy Hardy
  - At Old Fort Dearborn; or, Chicago in 1812 de Frank Montgomery: Dan Rawlins
  - The Massacre of Santa Fe Trail de Frank Montgomery
  - The Girl from Golden Run
  - A Shot in the Dark de Ben F. Wilson: Tom Selvige
  - For Love, Life and Riches de Frank Montgomery: Tom Warren

1913

  - An Indian Maid's Strategy de Frank Montgomery: Lieutenant Breen
  - Against Desperate Odds de Frank Montgomery :Bob, le Shérif
  - The Trail of the Lonesome Mine
  - Beyond the Law: Bill, l'adjoint du shérif
  - En permission de 24 heures (Soldiers Three): Ned
  - The Grand Old Flag de Henry MacRae
  - Love, Life and Liberty de Henry MacRae: Capitaine Mario
  - In the Secret Service de Henry MacRae: Lieutenant Barrett
  - One on Romance de Edwin Middleton
  - The Song of the Telegraph de Frank Montgomery: Lieutenant Richards
  - The Genius of Fort Lapawai: Bobby
  - Regimental Pals

1914

  - The Vanishing Tribe de Frank Montgomery: Deep Thunder
  - The Moonshiners de Frank Montgomery: Bart, agent du fisc
  - The Fuse of Death de Frank Montgomery: Lieutenant Countiss
  - The Gambler's Reformation de Frank Montgomery: Weedon, un joueur
  - The Cave of Death de Frank Montgomery: Deering, un prospecteur
  - Kidnapped by Indians de Frank Montgomery: Capitaine Blake
  - At the End of the Rope de Frank Montgomery: Manning, un colon
  - Grey Eagle's Revenge de Frank Montgomery
  - The Fate of a Squaw de Frank Montgomery: Larkin, un trappeur
  - The Gypsy Gambler de Frank Montgomery: Romano, le père de Paulena
  - Brought to Justice de Frank Montgomery: Shérif Tom Burden
  - The Squaw's Revenge de Frank Montgomery: Dan, un colon
  - The Call of the Tribe de Frank Montgomery: Dr Huff
  - The Bottled Spider de Frank Montgomery: Rex, alias "The Spider" (l'araignée)
  - The Redskins and the Renegades: Burns, de l'agence indienne
  - Grey Eagle's Last Stand de Frank Montgomery: Tom Wells, le fils du Major
  - The Fight on Deadwood Trail de Frank Montgomery: Griggs, un mineur
  - The Raid of the Red Marauders: Hal Stevens, un soldat
  - The Medicine Man's Vengeance: le "Medicine Man" blanc
  - The Hopi Raiders: Capitaine Clark
  - The Tigers of the Hills de Frank Montgomery: Lieutenant Howard
  - An Indian's Honor de Frank Montgomery: Burns, un prospecteur
  - Indian Fate de Frank Montgomery: Charles Bartells
  - The Indian Ambuscade de Frank Montgomery: Jack, un jeune mineur
  - The Paleface Brave de Frank Montgomery: Paul, le brave visage pâle
  - Red Hawk's Sacrifice de Frank Montgomery: Binfield, un joueur
  - Indian Blood de Frank Montgomery: Lieutenant Hayes
  - A Dream of the Wild de Frank Montgomery: Tom

1915

  - Pardoned de Tom Ricketts
  - The Great Question de Tom Ricketts
  - In Trust de B. Reeves Eason
  - By Whose Hand? de Henry Otto

1916

  - The Thunderbolt de William Bertram

1927

  - Don Desperado de Leo D. Maloney: Aaron Blaisdell

=== As director ===
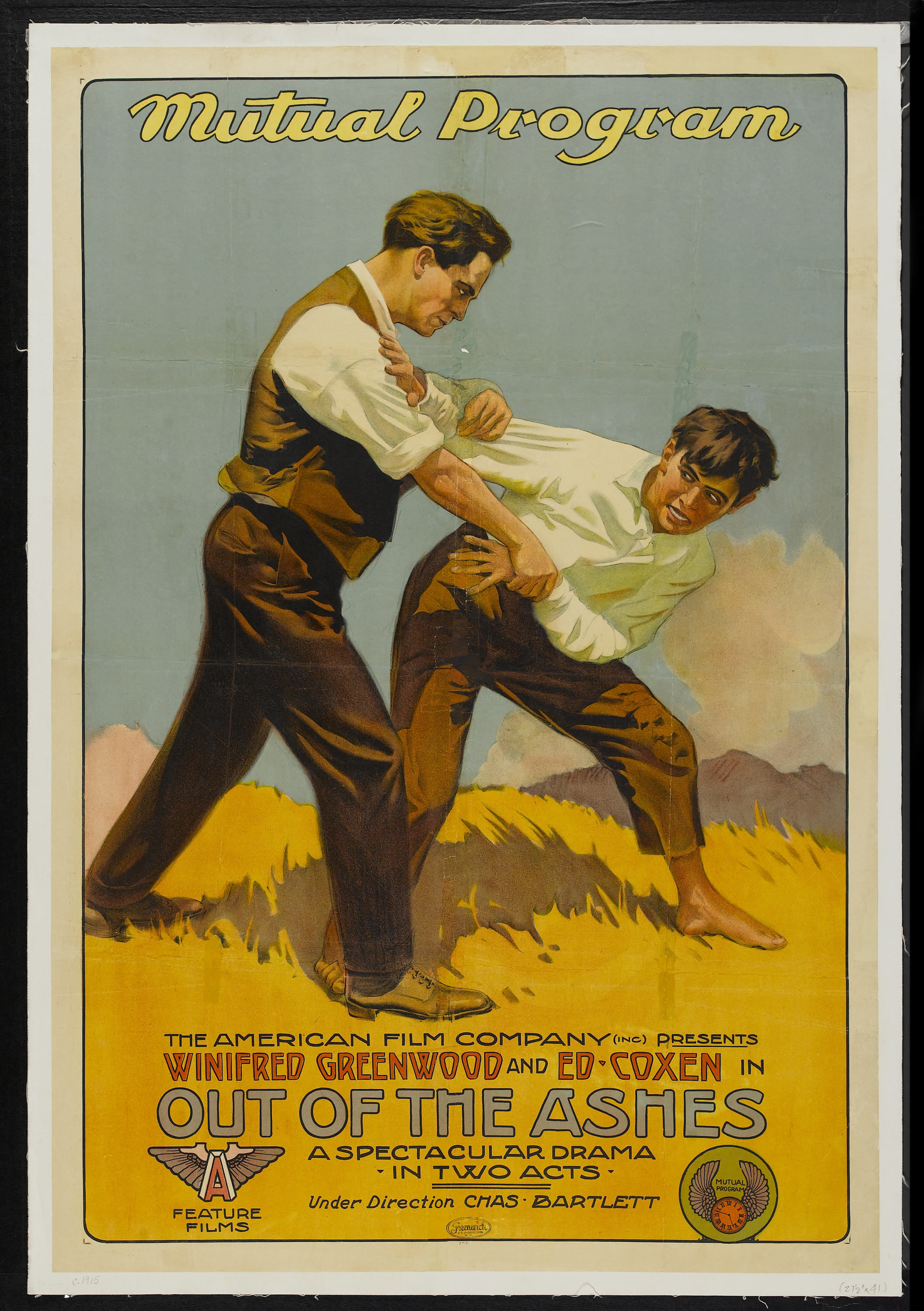
Poster for Out of the Ashes (1915

- The Clean-Up
- Spider Barlow's Soft Spot
- The Water Carrier of San Juan
- Spider Barlow Cuts In
- The Key to the Past
- Drifting
- Alice of Hudson Bay
- On Secret Service
- Out of the Ashes
- Visitors and Visitees
- The Sting of It
- Just as It Happened

1916

- The Girl Who Doesn't Know
- The Gold Band
- A Desperate Remedy
- The Small Magnetic Hand
- The Ancient Blood
- The Bruiser
- The Craving
- A Modern Sphinx
- The Silent Trail
- The Thoroughbred
- Spider Barlow Meets Competition

1917

- Jerry's Best Friend
- Jerry's Double Cross
- Jerry's Victory
- Hell Hath No Fury

1920

- Dangerous Love

1920

- Tangled Trails
- Headin' North
