= Quicksands (1913 film) =

1913 film by Allan Dwan

- Directed by: Allan Dwan
- Starring: J. Warren Kerrigan; Charlotte Burton; Vivian Rich
- Distributed by: Mutual Film
- Release date: June 30, 1913
- Running time: 2 reels (approximately 20 minutes)
- Country: United States
- Languages: Silent film English intertitles

Quicksands is a 1913 American silent short drama film directed by Allan Dwan. The film stars J. Warren Kerrigan, Charlotte Burton, Vivian Rich, George Periolat, Jack Richardson, Louise Lester, and Charles Morrison.

== Cast ==
- J. Warren Kerrigan as Frank
- Charlotte Burton as Helen Hubbard
- Vivian Rich as Ruth
- George Periolat as Hubbard - Helen's Father
- Jack Richardson as Warren
- Chick Morrison as Sea Captain (as Charles Morrison)
- James Harrison as Seaman Gus
- Louise Lester
