= Pool Sharks =

1915 film

- Directed by: Edwin Middleton
- Written by: W. C. Fields
- Produced by: Franco Cristaldi
- Starring: W. C. Fields; Bud Ross; Marian West
- Distributed by: Mutual Film Corporation
- Release date: September 19, 1915 (U.S.)
- Running time: 15 minutes
- Country: United States
- Language: Silent

Pool Sharks (also sometimes known as The Pool Shark) is a 1915 American silent short film. The film is notable for being the film acting and writing debut of W. C. Fields and also features early instances of stop-motion animation during a game of pool.

== Plot summary ==
Following a standard style of the era, the film is a romantic slapstick comedy short. Fields and his rival (played by Bud Ross) vie over the affections of a woman (played by Marian West). When their antics get out of hand at a picnic, it is decided that they should play a game of pool. Both of them are pool sharks, and after the game turns into a farce, a fight ensues. Fields throws a ball at his rival, who ducks. The ball flies through the window and breaks a hanging goldfish bowl, soaking the woman they are fighting over and leaving goldfish in her hair. She storms into the pool hall and rejects both men.

== Production ==
It was one of two short films Fields made for a company called Gaumont, distributed by Mutual. He and Ross made another short around the same time, His Lordship's Dilemma.

=== Casting ===
Fields helped make this film in New York City, taking time off from the Ziegfeld Follies, as publicity for the film pointed out. Vaudeville was Fields' primary vocation, and after completing Pool Sharks and His Lordship's Dilemma it would be nine years before he made his next known film, 1924's Janice Meredith.

Fields wore his obviously fake moustache in this film, as he did in all of his silent films. His character and mannerisms bear some resemblance to Charlie Chaplin's, although the persona Fields later developed in his sound comedies is foreshadowed during the picnic scene, when Fields's character dumps a small child out of a chair so that he can steal it to get closer to the woman he is chasing.

=== Animation ===
The animators hands being seen in a poorly edited sequence in the Billiards scene

Fields was an expert juggler. As with his early films, Pool Sharks was intended to highlight a pool ball juggling act that featured in the actor's vaudeville show. In the final film, however, there is only a brief shot of Fields juggling several billiard balls, as his act was largely replaced with several poorly edited stop motion sequences depicting impossible shots, such as the balls jumping off the table and re-racking themselves on the wall. Though innovative for the time, they are poorly animated, with obvious edits, and the animator's hand can actually be seen moving the balls along in one of the frames.

== Reaction ==
Today, Pool Sharks is best remembered as Fields' first film effort. Film historian William K. Everson critiques the film as an "auspicious debut", with Fields' routines and pacing already finely honed.
