= Tangled Trails =

1921 film

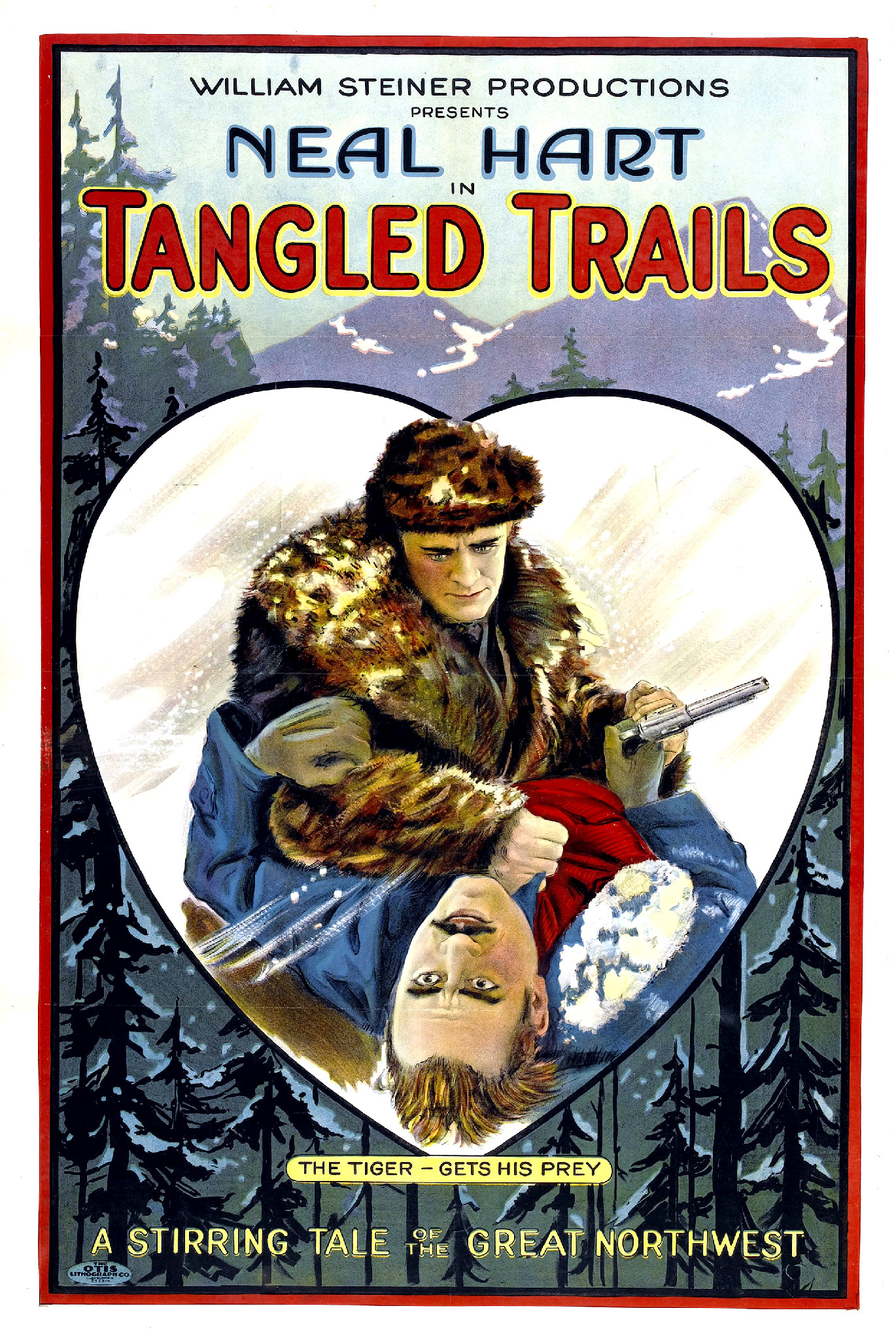
- Theatrical release poster
- Directed by: Charles Bartlett
- Written by: Charles Bartlett (story); Charles Bartlett (scenario)
- Produced by: Neal Hart (producer)
- Starring: Neal Hart; Violet Palmer
- Cinematography: Jacob A. Badaracco
- Production company: Neal Hart Productions
- Distributed by: William Steiner Productions
- Release date: December 1921
- Running time: 56 minutes
- Country: United States
- Languages: Silent; English intertitles

Tangled Trails

Tangled Trails is a 1921 American silent Western film directed by Charles Bartlett and starring Neal Hart and Violet Palmer. The film is also known as Sands of Sacrifice.

== Plot ==
As described in a film magazine, Corporal Jack Borden (Hart) of the Royal Canadian Mounted Police is assigned to arrest Phil Lawson (Roseman), a crooked mine promoter, on suspicion of murder. Discarding his uniform, Jack follows Phil to New York City and overtakes him just in time to rescue a stenographer from Lawson's clutches. Lawson escapes and, with Jack on his trail, foes to an underworld retreat. Jack overtakes him and is victorious in another battle, but the promoter escapes again. Still on his trail, Jack follows his man back to Canada where, after several fistfights, he finally captures Lawson and sent to pay for his crimes. Jack is finally able to return to his wife Milly (Palmer), from whom he has been long separated.

== Cast ==
- Neal Hart as Cpl Jack Borden
- Violet Palmer as Milly
- Gladys Hampton as Blanche Hall
- Jean Barry as Mrs Hall
- Jules Cowles as The Stranger
- Edward Roseman as Phil Lawson
- John Lowell as Granger (uncredited)

== Survival status ==
Copies of Tangled Trails survive and the film has been released on DVD.
