= One on Romance =

- Directed by: Edwin Middleton
- Written by: Anita Bresman
- Produced by: Siegmund Lubin
- Production company: Lubin Manufacturing Company
- Distributed by: General Film Company
- Release date: April 14, 1913
- Country: United States

One on Romance is a 1913 American silent black and white romance comedy film directed by Edwin Middleton, written by Anita Bresman, produced by Siegmund Lubin and starring Jack Barrymore.

It's a lost film on a split reel, where two films are placed on the same reel. The films was produced by the Philadelphia-based Lubin Manufacturing Company and was lost in an explosion and fire at the Lubin vaults in 1914.

== Cast ==
- Jack Barrymore as Jack Wilson
- Eleanor Caines as Helen Ross
- Frank DeVernon as Howard Ross - Helen's Father
- Charles Bartlett

== See also ==
- John Barrymore filmography
