= His Lordship's Dilemma =

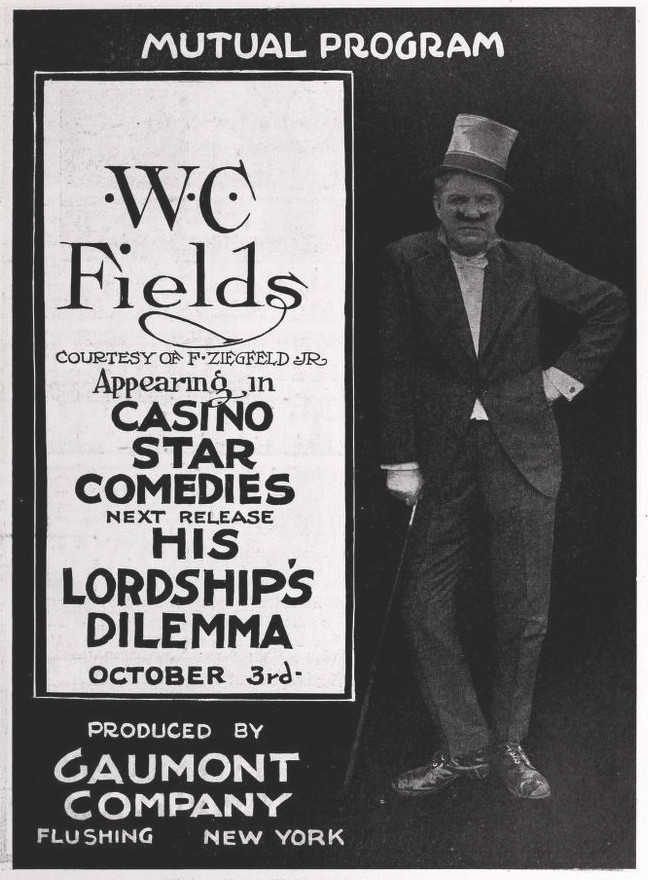
- Advertisement for the film
- Directed by: William F. Haddock
- Written by: Unknown
- Produced by: Gaumont
- Starring: W.C. Fields, Bud Ross, Walter Dukinfield (or Walter Fields)
- Distributed by: Mutual Film Corporation
- Release date: 1915
- Running time: Unknown
- Country: United States
- Language: Silent
- Budget: Unknown
- Box office: Unknown

His Lordship's Dilemma is a 1915 silent short comedy film produced by Gaumont and distributed by the Mutual Film Corporation. The film stars W.C. Fields as a remittance man, and part of the film includes an adaptation of the comedian's famous golf routine. It was directed by William F. Haddock.

Supporting players include Bud Ross, who also appeared with Fields in Pool Sharks earlier the same year; and Fields' brother Walter, in his only known film appearance, listed in various sources as Walter Dukinfield or Walter Fields (the family name is usually rendered as Dukenfield).

== Preservation status ==
His Lordship's Dilemma is a lost film.
