= The Gratitude of Wanda =

1913 American short film

- Directed by: Wallace Reid
- Written by: Bess Meredyth
- Production company: Bison Motion Pictures
- Distributed by: Universal Film Manufacturing Company
- Release date: August 30, 1913 (U.S.)
- Running time: 17 minutes
- Country: United States
- Language: English

The Gratitude of Wanda is a 1913 American short drama silent black and white film directed by Wallace Reid, written by Bess Meredyth and starring Pauline Bush, Arthur Rosson, Jessalyn Van Trump and Frank Borzage. Reid also appears in the film.

== Cast ==
- Wallace Reid as Wally
- Pauline Bush
- Arthur Rosson
- Jessalyn Van Trump
- Frank Borzage
