= Come Again Smith =

1919 film by E. Mason Hopper

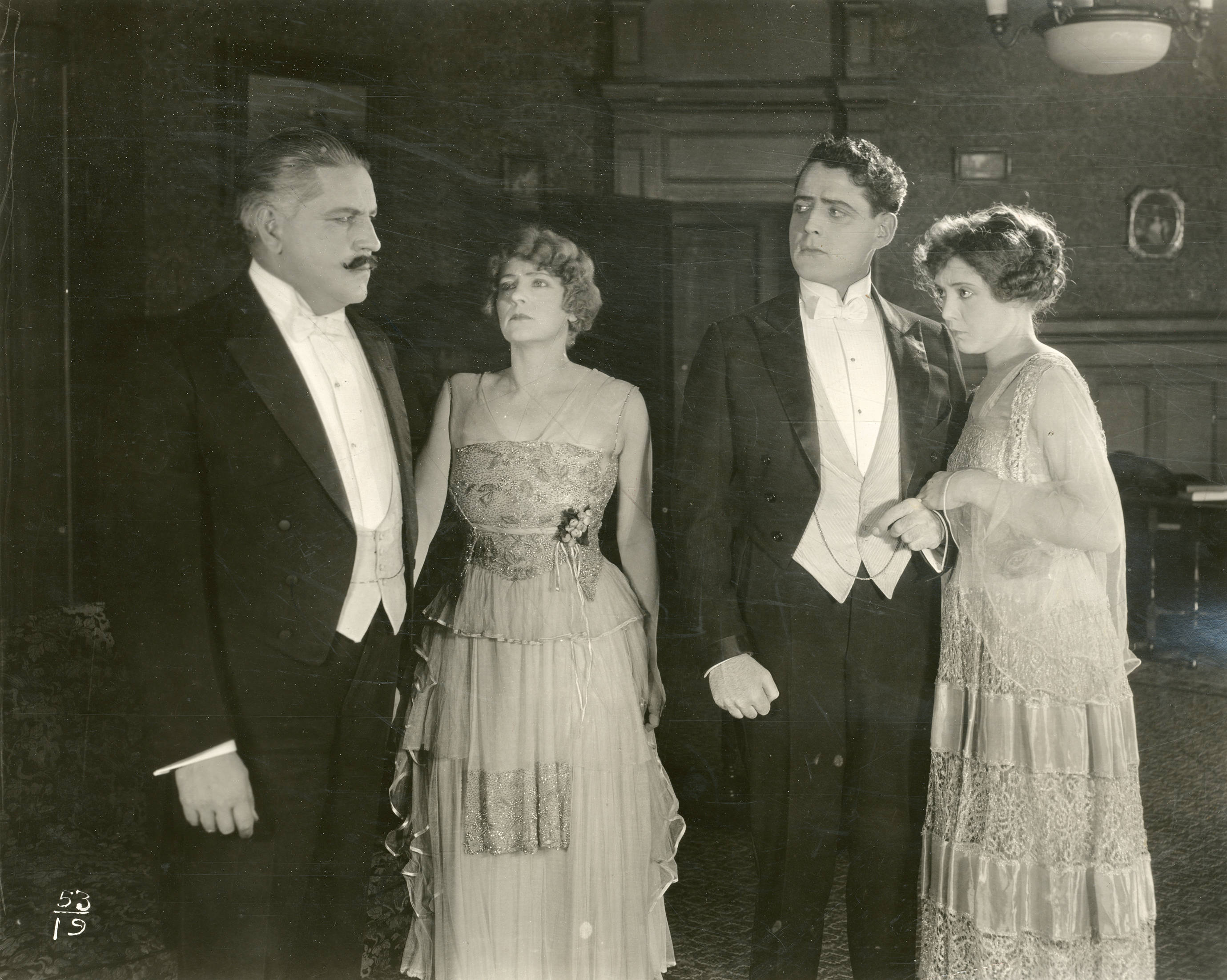
- Film still
- Directed by: E. Mason Hopper
- Based on: Come Again Smith by John H. Blackwood
- Produced by: Jesse Hampton
- Starring: J. Warren Kerrigan; Lois Wilson
- Distributed by: W. W. Hodkinson Corporation; Pathé Exchange
- Release date: February 10, 1919
- Running time: 5 reels
- Country: United States
- Language: Silent (English intertitles)

Come Again Smith is a lost 1919 American silent comedy-drama film distributed by Pathé Exchange and directed by E. Mason Hopper. It is based on a play Come Again Smith by John H. Blackwood.

== Cast ==
- J. Warren Kerrigan as Joe Smith
- Henry A. Barrows as Ned Stevens (credited as H. A. Barrows)
- William Conklin as Franklin Overton
- Winifred Greenwood as Anne Stevens
- Lois Wilson as Lucy Stevens
- Charles K. French as Joe Smith Sr. (credited as Charles French)
- Walter Perry as John Creighton
