= Barney Oldfield's Race for a Life =

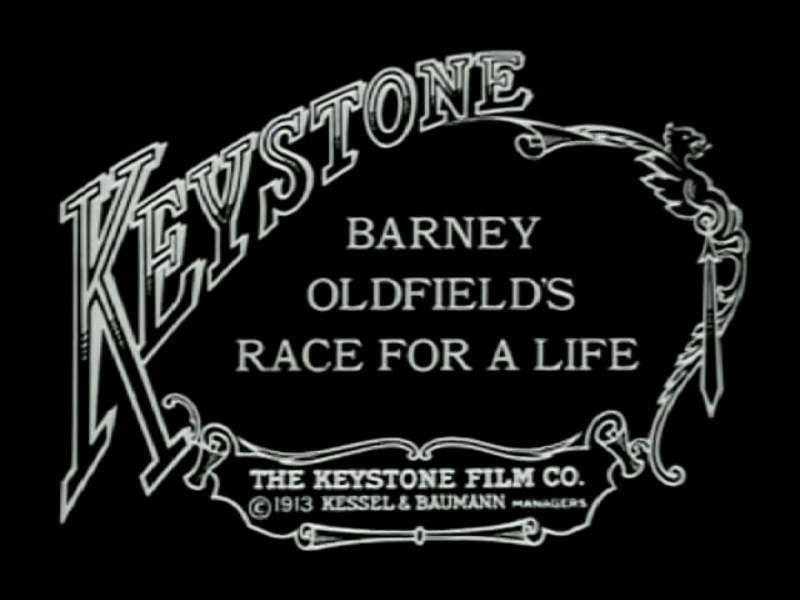
- Title from film
- Directed by: Mack Sennett
- Produced by: Mack Sennett
- Starring: Mack Sennett; Mabel Normand; Ford Sterling; Barney Oldfield; The Keystone Cops
- Cinematography: Lee Bartholomew; Walter Wright
- Distributed by: Keystone Film Company
- Release date: June 3, 1913
- Running time: 13 minutes
- Country: United States
- Languages: Silent film English intertitles

Barney Oldfield's Race for a Life is a 1913 American silent comedy short film, directed and produced by Mack Sennett. It stars Sennett, Mabel Normand, Ford Sterling, The Keystone Cops and Barney Oldfield as himself, in his film debut. It was distributed by the Keystone Film Company, and released in the United States on June 3, 1913. The film is preserved and was released as part of a DVD box set, titled Slapstick Encyclopedia, and is frequently featured in silent film festivals.

The film is notable for being one of the earliest films to include the plot of a villain tying a young damsel to the tracks of an oncoming locomotive; a holdover from the Gaslight era of Victorian stage melodrama. It's also considered one of the first films to put a camera into a car to give the audience a driver's eye viewpoint. The famous film still of Normand tied to the railroad tracks has been part of a museum exhibit, and featured in books chronicling the history of notable silent films.

== Plot ==
A lady, 'Mabel Sweet and Lovely' is courted by a gentleman, 'A Bashful Suitor'. He offers her a corsage which she accepts. They coyly share a kiss. After the Suitor leaves, the Villain appears and grabs the lady. She hits him and escapes. This angers the Villain and he vows to get his way. At the next opportunity, the Villain once again kidnaps the lady, this time with the help of two henchmen, and chains her to the railway tracks.

The three villains travel by handcar to the station, where they assault two workers and steal a locomotive engine. The villains drive the train back towards the location of Mabel who is still tied to the tracks.

The railyard worker alerts the Suitor about the situation, who then rushes to ask his friend, racecar driver, Barney Oldfield for help.

The two friends jump in the automobile and race the speeding hijacked locomotive to rescue the damsel in distress. Mabel is dramatically saved at the last moment and is carried away to safety. The foiled villain kills his accomplice and shoots five Keystone Cops arriving by handcar to arrest him. Finally he turns the gun on himself but upon discovering the bullet chamber empty, he drops dead in a rage.

== Cast ==
Barney Oldfield's Race for a Life (1913)

- Mabel Normand - Mabel Sweet And Lovely
- Mack Sennett - Bashful Suitor
- Ford Sterling - Villainous Rival
- Hank Mann - Villain's accomplice
- Barney Oldfield - Himself, a racing driver
- Al St. John - another accomplice of the Villain
- Helen Holmes - Beauty, talking to Oldfield at Picket Fence
- William Hauber - Villager
- The Keystone Cops

== Production and background ==
According to author William F. Nolan, Sennett was a racing fan, and approached Oldfield in a saloon and asked Oldfield; "did you ever think of getting into the flicks?". Oldfield responded with; "and have some dame throw a custard pie in my face?". Sennett told him he would be playing a "hero", and saving Normand from a "black-hearted villain" by outrunning a train. After hearing this, Oldfield told Sennett, "Mack, have a beer on the house, you just hired yourself a new movie star." After watching the film, Oldfield was said to have sadly shook his head and quipped: "For this kinda actin' I should have been hit by a custard pie."

In 1913, Motography reported that an agent for the Santa Fe Railway, gave Sennett permission to use the old Redondo Road, and a late model locomotive, baggage car and passenger coach in the film, and that a special permit was obtained from Inglewood, California authorities for Oldfield to go the limit in the speed line. Oldfield reached speeds of 90 mph while filming the chase of the train. Cinematographer Lee Bartholomew, was standing on the running board of the locomotive, photographing "every move of the villain at the throttle, while Walter Wright with another camera, was filming the race between the train and the automobile and the rescue".

Normand did her own stunt work in the film, with no "stunt double" being used for the scene where she was lying on the railroad tracks as the train approached.

== Themes and analysis ==
Author Chuck Klosterman says the plot of a villain tying a young damsel to the railroad tracks, dates back to the 1860s, and by 1913, the "trope had been adopted completely". He argues that the audience already sees the trope as being "comedic and satiric melodrama". He says the idea of "using a train to kill someone is so complicated and absurd that it can only be viewed as a caricature of villainy, because it was never based on any legitimate fear".

American media scholar Henry Jenkins and author Kristine Brunovska Karnick said that Sennett used the "race to the rescue" scenario to capitalize on its "thrilling and suspenseful qualities", and then "exploited those qualities for purely visceral pleasure", thereby "stripping the narrative situations in the film of their usual emotional or moral weight".

Author Mark Howell says that Oldfield's role as the driver who saves the "damsel in distress", promoted his image as a "brave and heroic race car driver, fearless in the face of danger, since that is the way in which he makes his living on the race track".

== Reviews ==
Contemporary reviews

The Moving Picture World praised the film saying; this company of funsters again comes under the wire a winner in this hilarious burlesque. Good burlesque without objectionable features.

Various newspapers and theaters gave the film positive reviews stating: one of the greatest melodramatic productions, featuring the well known speed king, Barney Oldfield, that has ever been produced; one of the greatest one-reel Keystone Comedies ever produced. A rip-roaring riot of fun, with the greatest comedy director Mack Sennett; Barney Oldfield in moving pictures should be a treat in itself; a unique film, a combination of sensational, thrilling and humorous melodrama.

Modern

Author Rob King said the film's "popularity resided precisely in their ability to fuse comic pleasure with genuine thrills, promoting hybridized viewing experiences that straddled the effective registers of slapstick and sensation melodrama".

Film critic Michael Grutchfield said the film is a "patently thin veneer hung over a thrilling chase and a lot of silly satire". He liked the photography in the picture, calling it "impressive for 1913". He opined that Oldfield didn't really have any "interest in even trying to act, his only job is to drive a fast car, and he does that fine". He argues the film "doesn’t hold up that well, and isn’t even of great historical interest, inasmuch as it seems to lead people to false conclusions".

Film critic Fritzi Kramer said the movie was a "pretty typical Keystone offering". She said "Sennett mugs himself silly but Normand and Sterling are as fun as ever". She graded the film a "solid C+", but stated it's only memorable "as one of those tied to the railroad tracks films".

== Legacy ==
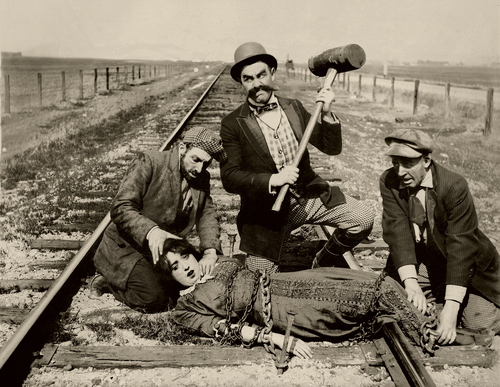
Iconic film still, with left to right: Hank Mann; Ford Sterling; Al St John and in foreground Mabel Normand

Beginning in May 1939, the Museum of Modern Art in Midtown Manhattan, New York City, held a month-long series of screenings that featured the film, along with sixty-nine other films, that traced the history and development of the motion picture from 1895-1935. The museum used the film still (seen here to the right), as part of the exhibit. Along with approximately 200 film stills from memorable motion pictures from MoMA's collection, the still also featured in the exhibition A Survey of American Film, staged in Detroit the same year.

In 1940, the film still was exhibited at Duke University, as part of a circulating exhibit from the Museum of Modern Art. In 1944, the film still was included in the book A Pictorial History of the Movies, by Deems Taylor, which featured 700 scenes from famous movies of the past half century.

In 1955, the Quad-City Times featured the famous film still as part of a series titled "Remember These Old-Time Movies". In 1957, the film still was featured in the book The Laugh Makers: A Pictorial History of American Comedians by William Cahn.

In 2013, the short film was featured as part of the Academy of Motion Picture Arts and Sciences centennial celebration for one-reeler short films. The film was presented on a restored 1909 hand-cranked Powers Model 6 Camergraph Motion Picture Machine, created by Nicholas Power, and cranked by Library of Congress consultant Joe Rinaudo. (Note: Joe Rinaudo, consultant and provider of restored films to the Library of Congress, demonstrates threading a 1909 Powers Cameragraph Motion Picture Machine.)

Daniel Buttridge of The Independent, credits the film for the "stereotypical mustachioed meanie", which became a "cultural convention", that he says, is still employed "by all manner of media almost a century later".

== Gallery ==
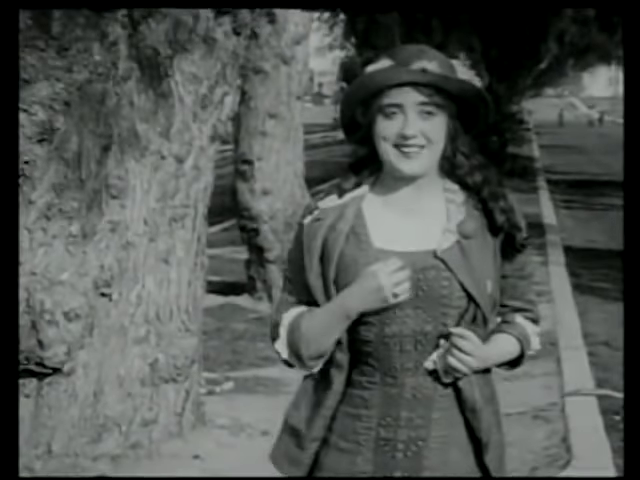
Mabel Sweet And Lovely

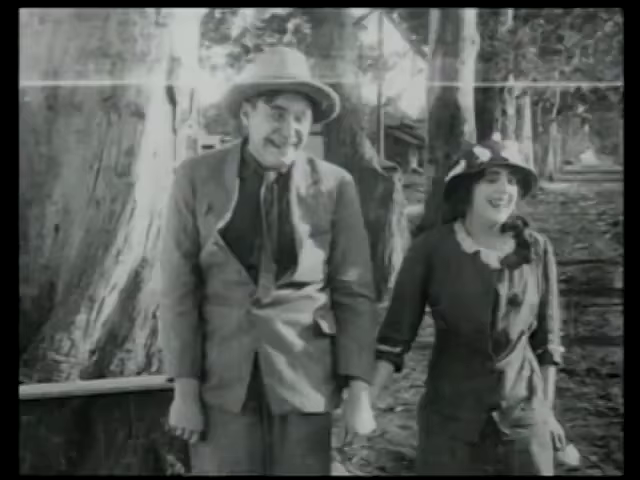
The Bashful Suitor

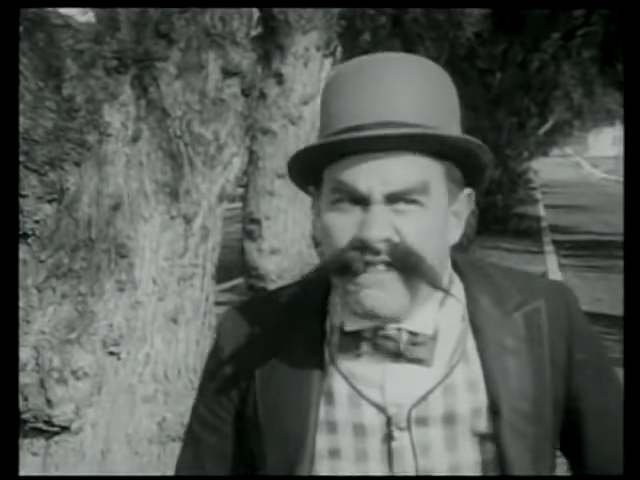
The Villainous Rival

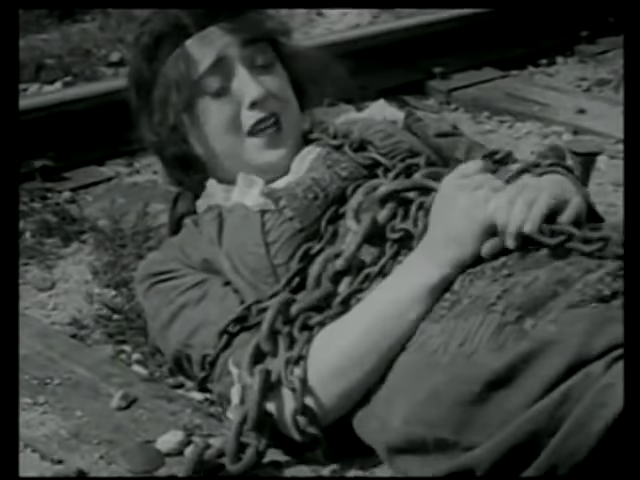
Mabel chained to the tracks

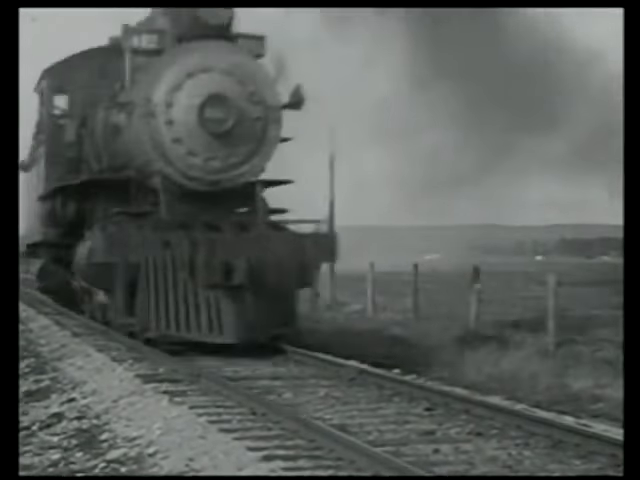
Train racing towards Mabel

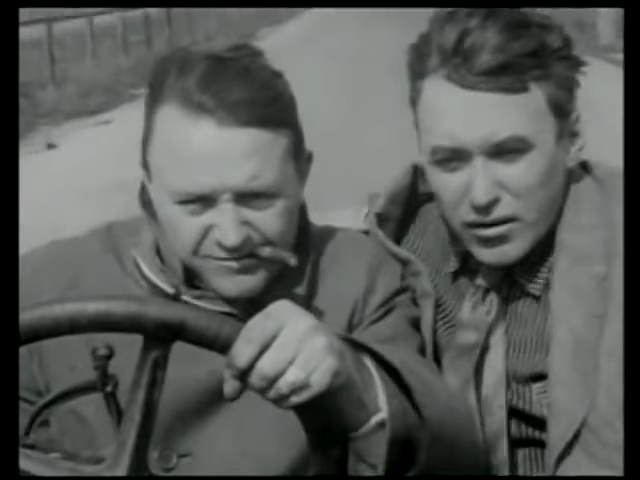
Barney Oldfield and Mabel's suitor speeding to save her

== Sources ==
Books and magazines

- Boggs, Johnny D. (2021). Sports on Film. Bloomsbury Publishing. p. 227. ISBN 979-8-216-14822-7.
- Cahn, William (1957). "Flickers: From Custard Pie to Cheescake". The Laugh Makers: A Pictorial History of American Comedians. introduction by Harold Lloyd. New York: Putnam. p. 92.
- Chalmers, J. P., ed. (June 7, 1913). "Comments On The Films: Barney Oldfield's Race For Life". The Moving Picture World. Chalmers Publishing Company. p. 1033. This article incorporates text from this source, which is in the public domain.
- Howell, Mark D. (1997). From Moonshine to Madison Avenue: A Cultural History of the NASCAR Winston Cup Series. Popular Press. p. 85. ISBN 978-0-87972-740-6.
- Karnick, Kristine Brunovska; Jenkins, Henry (February 1, 2013). Classical Hollywood Comedy. Routledge. p. 180. ISBN 978-1-135-21323-7.
- King, Rob (December 10, 2008). The Fun Factory: The Keystone Film Company and the Emergence of Mass Culture. University of California Press. ISBN 9780520255388.
- Klosterman, Chuck (2013). I Wear the Black Hat: Grappling with Villains (Real and Imagined). Simon and Schuster. p. 10. ISBN 978-1-4391-8450-9.
- Lefler, Timothy Dean (March 23, 2016). Mabel Normand: The Life and Career of a Hollywood Madcap. McFarland. pp. 45–46. ISBN 978-0-7864-7867-5.
- "Barney Oldfield in Keystone Speed Film". Motography. Vol. 9, no. 6. Electricity Magazine Corporation. March 15, 1913. p. 206. This article incorporates text from this source, which is in the public domain.
- Nolan, William F. (1961). "To Tame A Beast". Barney Oldfield: The Life and Times of America's Legendary Speed King. New York: Putnam. pp. 126–127.
- Roots, James (May 11, 2017). 100 Essential Silent Film Comedies. Rowman & Littlefield. p. 123. ISBN 978-1-4422-7825-7.
- Taylor, Deems (1949). "Birth and Infancy". A Pictorial History Of The Movies. New York: Simon & Schuster. p. 30.
- Treadwell, Lawrence (June 30, 2022). Highball: Railway Movies. Page Publishing. p. 23. ISBN 978-1-6624-7237-4.

Newspapers

- "Bijou Stehle Block". The Altoona Times. Altoona, Pennsylvania. June 10, 1913. p. 14. This article incorporates text from this source, which is in the public domain.
- Bettridge, Daniel (February 24, 2012). "There's no bushiness like movie bushiness". The Independent. p. 12. ProQuest 923099257.
- "A Survey of the American Film Highlights Progress of American Movies". Detroit Free Press. Detroit, Michigan. May 8, 1939. p. 7.
- "When Daddy Was A Boy". The Durham Sun. Durham, North Carolina. February 3, 1940. p. 5.
- "Here's The Greatest Ever". The Elwood Call Leader. Elwood, Indiana. July 10, 1915. p. 8. This article incorporates text from this source, which is in the public domain.
- King, Susan (December 6, 2013). "'A Century Ago': Academy offering screening of films from 1913". Baltimore Sun. Los Angeles Times. Archived from the original on September 11, 2023.
- "Today At the Grand". The Mansfield News. Mansfield, Ohio. June 14, 1913. p. 7. This article incorporates text from this source, which is in the public domain.
- "Crystal Theatre". The Meriden Daily Journal. Meriden, Connecticut. June 10, 1913. p. 7. This article incorporates text from this source, which is in the public domain.
- Nugent, Frank S. (May 21, 1939). "The Movie Finger Writes". The New York Times. ProQuest 102929339.
- "Remember These Old-Time Movies". Quad-City Times. Davenport, Iowa. October 11, 1955.
- "A Recently Published Book". Star-Tribune. Minneapolis, Minnesota. March 29, 1958. p. 27.
- "The Movies - From Peep-Show Days To Art Form". St. Louis Star and Times. St. Louis, Missouri. January 8, 1944. p. 9.

Web sources

- Bennett, Carl (2012). "Silent Era: Home Video Reviews". Silent Era.
- Grutchfield, Michael (December 11, 2015). "Barney Oldfield's Race for a Life (1913)". Century Film Project. Archived from the original on August 23, 2019.
- Kramer, Fritzi (October 21, 2015). "Barney Oldfield's Race for a Life (1913) A Silent Film Review". Movies Silently.
- Video-Oscars.org (February 19, 2014). "Inside the Booth". Oscars, the Academy of Motion Picture Arts and Sciences – via YouTube.
