= The Turn of a Card =

1918 silent film

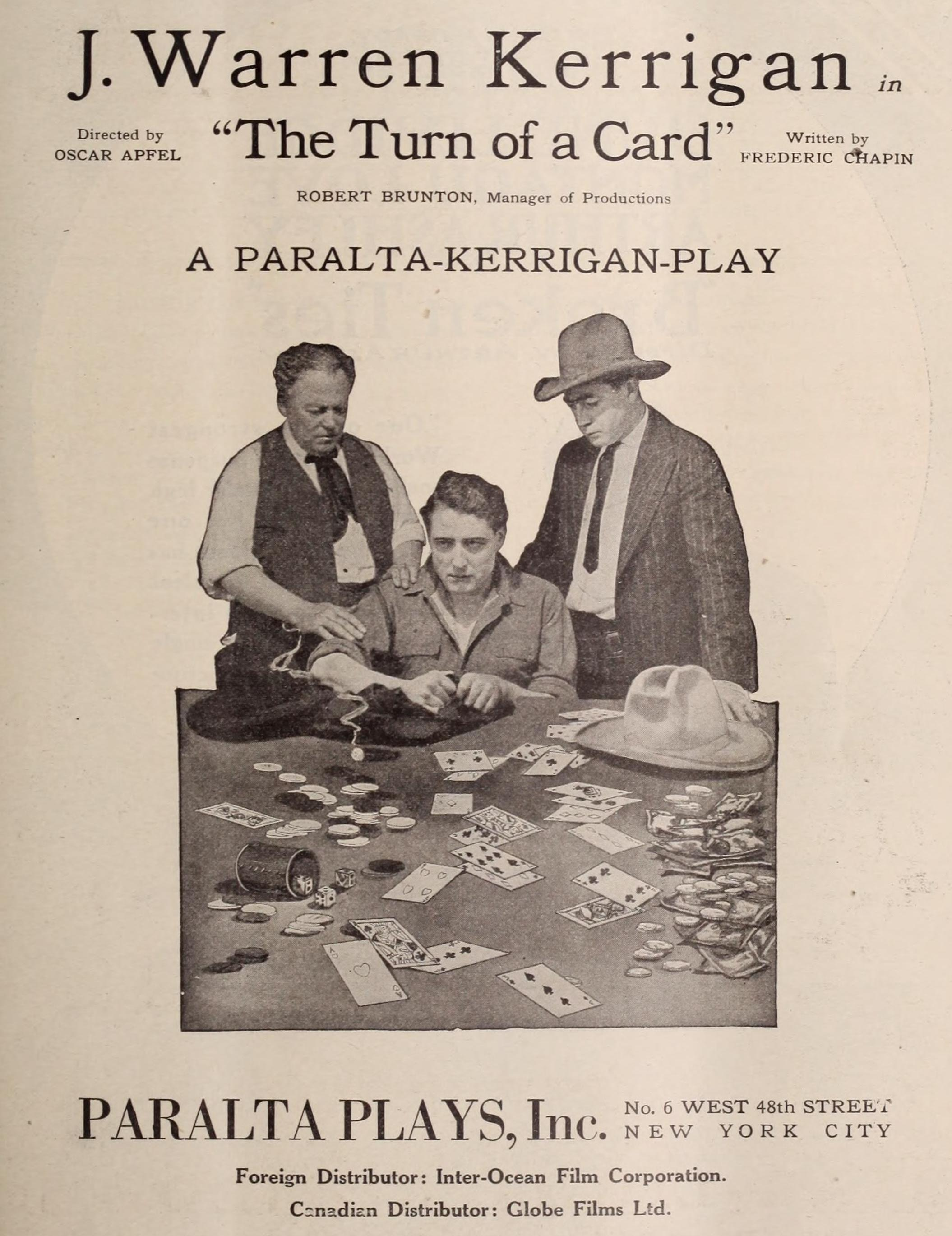
- Directed by: Oscar Apfel
- Written by: Frederick Chapin; Thomas J. Geraghty
- Starring: J. Warren Kerrigan; Lois Wilson; Eugene Pallette
- Cinematography: Henry Bredesen; L. Guy Wilky
- Production company: Paralta Plays
- Distributed by: Hodkinson Pictures
- Release date: February 15, 1918
- Running time: 70 minutes
- Country: United States
- Languages: Silent; English intertitles

The Turn of a Card is a 1918 American silent comedy film directed by Oscar Apfel and starring J. Warren Kerrigan, Lois Wilson and Eugene Pallette. The film is considered lost.

== Cast ==
- J. Warren Kerrigan as Jimmie Montgomery Farrell
- Lois Wilson as Cynthia Burdette
- Eugene Pallette as Eddie Barrett
- William Conklin as William Phelps
- David Hartford as 'Ace High' Burdette
- Frank Clark as Finnegan
- Clifford Alexander as 'Curio' Johnson
- Elinor Fair as Millie Jarvis
- Roy Laidlaw as Mr. Marvis
- Albert R. Cody as Slavin
- Wallace Worsley as John Hays Cotton

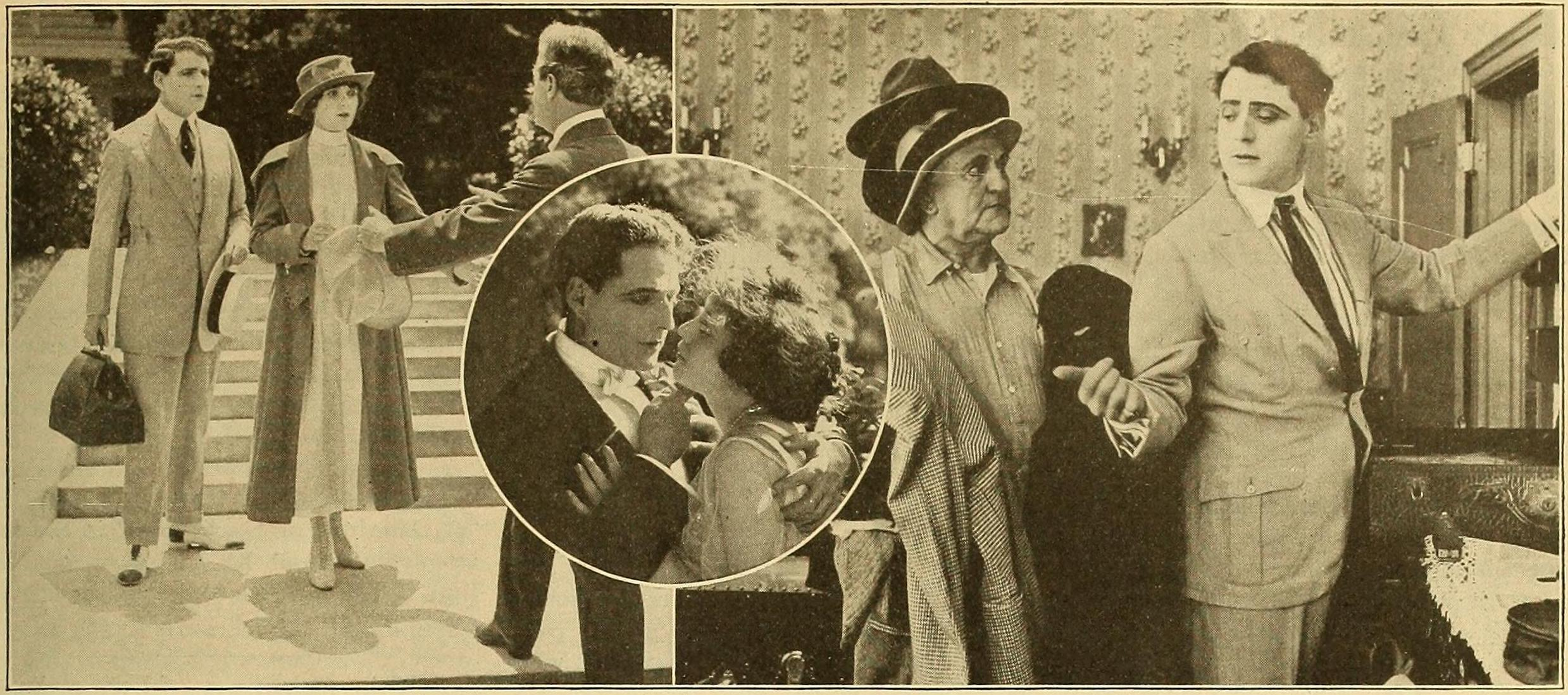
Collection of stills from the film in Motography, 1918

== Bibliography ==
- Rainey, Buck. Sweethearts of the Sage: Biographies and Filmographies of 258 actresses appearing in Western movies. McFarland & Company, 1992.
