= Edwin Middleton =

American film director (1865–1929)

- Born: January 1, 1865; Philadelphia, Pennsylvania, U.S.
- Died: June 17, 1929 (aged 64)
- Occupations: Film director, screenwriter

Pool Shark

Edwin Middleton (January 1, 1865 – June 17, 1929) was an American film director.

== Biography ==
He worked in theater as part of a stock company from Philadelphia before his film career. In 1891, he was an actor in a production titled Sin and Shadow. In 1906, he is credited with a part in a Broadway production titled Matilda as "Dr. Lamb".

He directed W.C. Fields's film debut in Pool Sharks in 1915. He also directed several shorts with casts that included Bud Ross. He made a series of films for the Gaumont.

He directed at least three "Cissy" films starring Cissy Fitzgerald. He worked for Gaumont in Jacksonville, Florida.

He was an organizer of the Motion Picture Directors Association of New York.

== Filmography ==
- The Dream of a Motion Picture Director (1912)
- Lime Kiln Field Day (1913) – The oldest surviving film featuring African American actors
- One on Romance (1913)
- Because of a Hat (1914), writer
- Rip Van Winkle (1914)
- The Flaming Sword (1915)
- The Widow Wins (1915)
- Leave it to Cissy (1915)
- Curling Cissy (1915)
- Cissy's Innocent Wink (1915)
- The Reformer (1915)
- Ethel's Romeos (1915)
- Pool Sharks (1915) – The first film appearance of W.C. Fields
- Wildfire (1915)
- The Haunted Manor (1916)
- The Isle of Love (1916)
- Flames of Vengeance (1916)
- Armadale (1916) – An adaptation of Armadale
- Gates of Divorce
- The Criminals Thumb (1916)
- The Hidden Face (1916)
- Gates of Divorce (1916) – A "three-part drama"
