= In the Secret Service =

1913 film

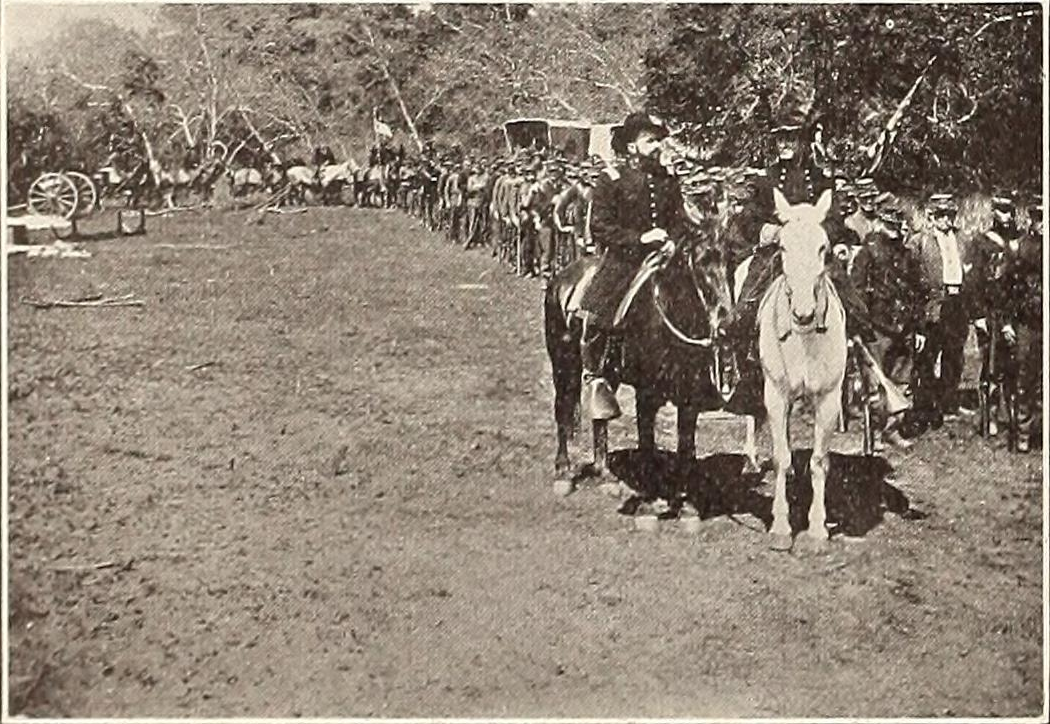
- Directed by: Henry MacRae
- Produced by: Bison Film Company
- Starring: Charles Bartlett
- Production company: Bison Film Company
- Distributed by: Universal Film Manufacturing Company
- Release date: May 17, 1913
- Running time: 10 minutes
- Country: United States
- Languages: Silent; English intertitles

In the Secret Service is a 1913 American short silent Western film directed by Henry MacRae.

== Plot ==
According to a film magazine, "General Gordon, of the Federal army, receives a message from General Grant, telling him to intercept important dispatches "from Lee to Webber, carried over wires" in Gordon's vicinity. Lieutenant Barrett assumes the task: takes his instruments and sets out. Colonel Webber, of the Confederate army, has a daughter Edith. Lieutenant Fairfax aspires to her hand, but his attentions only annoy her. Barrett taps the wires, but is seen by a Confederate officer and shot. The officer creeps up to him, thinking him dead, and Barrett suddenly shoots, kills him, and takes his uniform. He finds some plans in the dead man's pockets addressed to Col. Webber and copies them. He ties the copied information on his horse and starts the animal toward the Federal camp. He then mounts the Confederate's horse and soon meets Edith. She, seeing a wounded Confederate officer, sympathizes with him and takes him to her father's home. Meanwhile the horse reaches the Federal camp and Gordon gets the message and plans.

Fairfax and others depart for the front and Barrett is left with Edith. By this time he is thoroughly in love with the girl and he leaves her with genuine regrets. Riding to the dead officer he dons his own garments and rides safely to the Federal lines. That night Edith takes a message that the Federals are advancing. She gets her horse and rides madly to her father's camp, where Barrett's treachery is discovered. The Confederates fill the trenches with dummy soldiers. When the Federals charge they are overwhelmed by the Confederates. Barrett's troops are beaten back. The retreating Federals decide to surprise the town where Webber lives. The Colonel, Edith and Fairfax barricade the house, but Fairfax is fatally wounded. The Colonel also is badly wounded. Barrett gives Edith his coat and hat, telling her to save her father. As they are about to go, Barrett is shot in the head and passes, away in the arms of Edith."

== Cast ==
- Charles Bartlett
- Phyllis Gordon as Edith
- Richard Stanton as Frank Armor (unconfirmed)
- Hoot Gibson
- Bertha Blanchard

== See also ==
- Hoot Gibson filmography
