= Calamity Anne's Dream =

1913 film

- Directed by: Allan Dwan
- Starring: Louise Lester; Harry von Meter; Dorothy Eliason
- Distributed by: Mutual Film
- Release date: November 22, 1913
- Running time: 11 minutes
- Country: United States
- Languages: Silent; English intertitles

Calamity Anne's Dream is a 1913 American short silent Western film directed by Allan Dwan and starring Louise Lester as Calamity Anne. The film also stars Harry von Meter, Dorothy Eliason Jacques Jaccard, Charles Morrison, Jack Richardson and Vivian Rich.
