= Calamity Anne, Heroine =

1913 film

- Directed by: Lorimer Johnston
- Starring: Louise Lester; Charlotte Burton; J. Warren Kerrigan; Jack Richardson
- Distributed by: Mutual Film
- Release date: September 15, 1913
- Country: United States
- Languages: Silent; English intertitles

Calamity Anne, Heroine is a 1913 American short silent Western film directed by Lorimer Johnston starring Louise Lester as Calamity Anne. It is the fourth film in the Calamity Anne series.

== Other cast ==
- Charlotte Burton - Mrs. Smith
- J. Warren Kerrigan
- Jack Richardson -Tramp
- Helen Armstrong - Helen
- Violet Neitz - Maid
- Charles Morrison - Sherriff
- George Periolat - Mr. Smith
