= The Girl and the Greaser =

- Directed by: Allan Dwan
- Written by: J. Edward Hungerford
- Starring: Charlotte Burton; J. Warren Kerrigan; Louise Lester
- Distributed by: Mutual Film
- Release date: November 3, 1913
- Country: United States
- Languages: Silent film English intertitles

The Girl and the Greaser is a 1913 American silent short film directed by Allan Dwan starring Charlotte Burton, J. Warren Kerrigan, Louise Lester, George Periolat, Jack Richardson and Vivian Rich.
