= Calamity Anne's Inheritance =

1913 film

- Directed by: Allan Dwan
- Starring: Louise Lester; Charlotte Burton; J. Warren Kerrigan
- Distributed by: Mutual Film
- Release date: January 11, 1913
- Country: United States
- Languages: Silent; English intertitles

Calamity Anne's Inheritance is a 1913 American short silent Western film directed by Allan Dwan. It stars Louise Lester as Calamity Anne, with J. Warren Kerrigan and Charlotte Burton.

== Cast ==
- Louise Lester as Calamity Anne
- J. Warren Kerrigan as The Agent
- Charlotte Burton
- Jessalyn Van Trump
- Jack Richardson
