= For the Flag =

1913 film

- Directed by: Lorimer Johnston
- Produced by: Lorimer Johnson (Scenario)
- Starring: Charlotte Burton; J. Warren Kerrigan; George Periolat; Jack Richardson
- Distributed by: Mutual Film
- Release date: August 25, 1913
- Country: United States
- Languages: Silent film English intertitles

For the Flag is a 1913 American silent short drama film written and directed by Lorimer Johnston. The film features Charlotte Burton, George Periolat, J. Warren Kerrigan, Jack Richardson, and Vivian Rich.
