= Calamity Anne's Beauty =

1913 film

- Directed by: Allan Dwan
- Starring: Louise Lester; Charlotte Burton; J. Warren Kerrigan; Phyllis Gordon
- Distributed by: Mutual Film
- Release date: March 29, 1913
- Country: United States
- Languages: Silent; English intertitles

Calamity Anne's Beauty is a 1913 American silent short Western comedy film directed by Allan Dwan and starring Louise Lester as Calamity Anne.

== Other cast ==
- Charlotte Burton
- J. Warren Kerrigan
- Phyllis Gordon
- Jack Richardson
- Jessalyn Van Trump
- George Periolat
