= Rory o' the Bogs =

1913 film

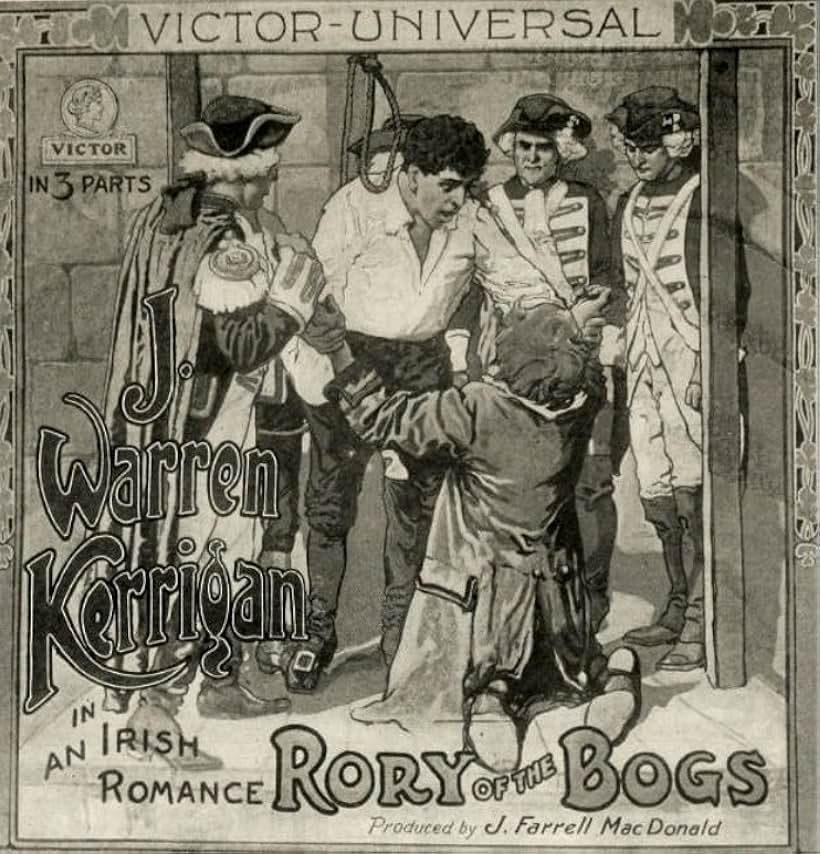
- Directed by: J. Farrell MacDonald
- Starring: J. Warren Kerrigan
- Production company: Victory Studios
- Release date: December 22, 1913
- Country: United States
- Language: Silent with English intertitles

Rory o' the Bogs is a 1913 American silent short drama film directed by J. Farrell MacDonald. Harold Lloyd has an uncredited role.

== Plot ==
According to a film magazine, "At the death of Burke, the bulk of his fortune goes to his only son, Rory, a baby in arms. The child is in the keeping of his uncle, Sir Everett, who has a son of Rory's age. That his own son might inherit the fortune Everett causes Rory to be kidnapped.

Twenty years later show Sir Everett's son grown up to be a cad of dissolute habits, but wealthy as a result of the stolen inheritance. Rory has grown to manhood in the home of a poor widow and her daughter, Eileen. Rory is in love with Kathleen, a peasant girl. Sir Everett's son wrongs Rory's foster sister. She dies and Rory swears vengeance upon the wrongdoer. However, vengeance is taken out of his hands. The kidnapper gets into an altercation with the son and kills him. Rory finds the body, is accused of the murder and is convicted and condemned to die.

The kidnapper, conscience stricken, confesses to a priest, a good friend of Rory's. The priest cannot dishonor the sanctity of the confessional by making the confession public. Instead, he goes to Rory's cell and changes clothes with the young man. Rory escapes, but is speedily recaptured.

The time for the execution of Rory arrives. The death-bell tolls out mournfully. It arouses the conscience stricken kidnapper to action. He rushes to the gallows and arrives there an instant before Rory is to be hung. He confesses that the crime was his. Rory is liberated. The tolling of the death-bell also arouses the conscience of Sir Everett. He confesses the kidnapping and restores Rory to his inheritance."

== Cast ==
- J. Warren Kerrigan as Rory o' the Bogs
- William Walters
- Edith Bostwick
- Jessalyn Van Trump
- George Periolat
- William Abbott
- Harold Lloyd as Posse Member (uncredited)

== See also ==
- Harold Lloyd filmography
