= The Restless Spirit =

1913 film

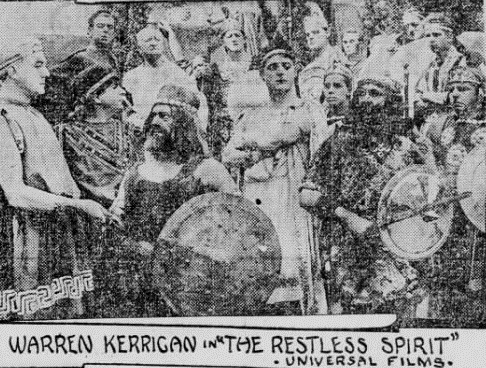
- A promotional image from the film
- Directed by: Allan Dwan
- Written by: Allan Dwan
- Based on: Elegy Written in a Country Churchyard by Thomas Gray
- Starring: J. Warren Kerrigan; Pauline Bush; Lon Chaney (unbilled)
- Cinematography: Walter Pritchard
- Distributed by: Universal Film Manufacturing Company
- Release date: October 27, 1913
- Running time: 3 reels
- Country: United States
- Languages: Silent; English intertitles

The Restless Spirit is a 1913 American silent short drama film written and directed by Allan Dwan, featuring J. Warren Kerrigan, Lon Chaney (in an uncredited dual role), and Pauline Bush. The film is based on Thomas Gray's 1751 poem, Elegy Written in a Country Churchyard, and tells the story of a man who wishes to be a conqueror. A series of illusions follows which show him the futility of conquest when he cannot even conquer his own community.

The film makes use of numerous dissolves which were technically difficult to execute, and reportedly sent the cameraman to the hospital due to stress. The film may have been the last unbilled appearance by Lon Chaney, and was released on October 27, 1913 by Universal Film Manufacturing Company under the Victor label. The film is presumed lost. Photos (found in the estate of George Chaney) showing Lon Chaney in his dual roles can be seen online.

== Plot ==
The film begins with the Dreamer, a restless and disappointed dreamer who has a wife and child. He gazes at his hands and dreams of becoming a great conqueror, but laments that no opportunities ever come to him, and so he continues to dream. The Dreamer becomes the subject of ridicule and his wife becomes the subject of pity by the community. The Dreamer decides to enter the world of men and abandons his wife, leaving her to seek refuge from her father. Her father wishes for her to marry a wealthy gentleman who is also a stranger in the town.

The Dreamer heads off into the desert and wanders until exhaustion takes its toll. A woman called "The Desert Flower" finds him and takes him to her hut in the desert. There she spends her time looking over the garments of the man who once courted her, who happens to be the same stranger who is now attempting to marry the Dreamer's wife. The woman learns of the Dreamer's story and shows the Dreamer the futility of conquering worlds unknown when he cannot even conquer his own small corner of the world. The Dreamer sees visions of himself in the roles of various great conquerors, but each vision ends in death. Meanwhile the Dreamer's wife has been kicked out of her father's home for refusing to marry the Stranger, and is reunited with the Dreamer at the edge of the desert. The Stranger is sent out into the desert, and the Dreamer and his wife return to the town. In time, the Dreamer becomes respected by the community.

== Cast ==
- J. Warren Kerrigan as The Husband / The Dreamer
- Pauline Bush as The Wife
- Jessalyn Van Trump as The Desert Flower
- William Worthington as The Stranger
- George Periolat
- Lon Chaney in a dual role as A Russian Count / A Wild Man Barbarian (uncredited)

== Production ==
The groundwork for The Restless Spirit began when Allan Dwan visited Universal's offices in New York City in late July 1913. Frederic Lombardi believes that it was during this meeting that Carl Laemmle offered Dwan's colleagues double their pay from Flying A if they would come to Universal. In the following weeks, J. Warren Kerrigan came to Universal and the two would work together in the production of The Restless Spirit. Dwan credits the idea to adapt and produce a film on Thomas Gray's Elegy Written in a Country Churchyard as a betting challenge. Dwan also claimed to have studied Gray's poem and dream about the production before accepting the challenge. Frederic Lombardi, author of Allan Dwan and the Rise and Decline of the Hollywood Studios, writes that Dwan may have been emboldened after the production of the Pickett Guard and the lack of structure in Gray's poem. Since the poem had no "real story", Dwan could formulate his own allegorical plot. Dwan was also able to convince his employers that the work would be a box office success and intended to use the film a prestigious multi-role vehicle for Kerrigan's debut at Universal. Lombardi writes that Dwan was subject to produce overtly artistic films, but these tendencies were kept in check by Dwan's more practical inclinations.

The film's ethereal aspects and double exposures were performed in the camera because the ability to create the effects in lab did not yet exist. Dwan made 24 dissolves in the film, each required precise control by the cameramen and that the counts had to be exact otherwise the shot would be ruined. Lombardi notes that the cinematographer, Walter Pritchard, was the man who had to go through the ordeal and that Universal said he was one of the company's oldest men. Dwan would claim that Pritchard would end up in the hospital from the production. In The Parade's Gone By, Brownlow instead gives the number of dissolves as 25 and adds to the story by Dwan claiming that the audience could not figure out the effect was done. Dwan also claimed that by the time 15 dissolves were done that the cinematographer was so nervous that it would keep him up at night and cause his hands to shake so greatly that an assistant would have to reload the film at the right spot before shots.

This production may have been the last unbilled movie credit of Lon Chaney. The discovery of Lon Chaney's role was through Chaney having marked his appearance in a still with an X above his head. Chaney wrote "This is me just below the X sign. Here I am a Russian Prince" on the back of the still. The image leaves no question that it comes from The Restless Spirit because it also appeared on the cover of The Universal Weekly for October 23, 1913. The second image found in the estate depicts Lon Chaney in the role of a primitive wild man, which Mirsalis says occurs in a fantasy sequence in the film.

== Release ==
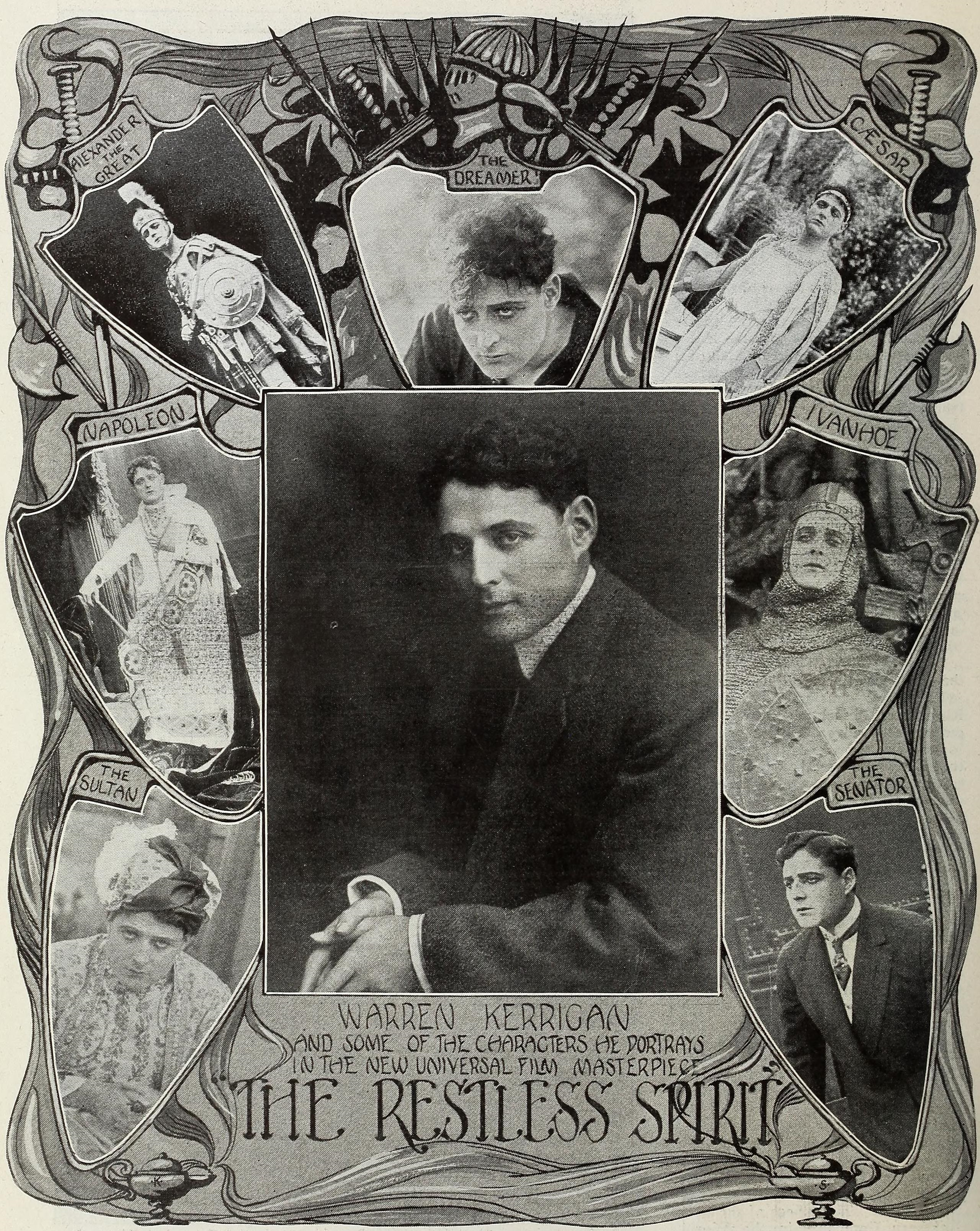
Roles performed by Kerrigan in The Restless Spirit

On September 6, 1913, Motography reported that J. Warren Kerrigan would star in the upcoming picture known as A Restless Spirit with a reference to Kerrigan's transfer to Universal. Alternate names for the film such as His Restless Spirit and A Restless Spirit.

It is unknown if the film was initially planned or if it was mere assumption, but it was reported that it would be a two reel production in September 1913. Newspaper accounts change to reference the film as having three reels by October 3, 1913. As details spread in the newspaper, the film's working title continued to be referenced as A Restless Spirit in various papers. Newspaper references began to reference the final title on October 24, 1913. The film was released on October 27, 1913 by Universal Film Manufacturing Company under the Victor label.

With the film's release on October 27, it was of minor note that the Alcazar of Atlanta, Georgia would show the film until November 1, 1913. The film would be a special for the week at the Hippodrome in Leavenworth, Kansas. Some theaters, such as the Alamo of El Paso, Texas would only show the film for a single day. The Unique theater, also of El Paso, would show the film on October 29 due to a "slip-up" with Universal's New York office. The advertisement would also mention Kerrigan's popularity in the area in otherwise apparent contrast to the Alamo's single day run. Another advertisement noted the film's artistry and that it is one of the best three-reel films released, but the film would play for only a single day. The film received play in various theaters until at least July 1914.

== Reception and fate ==
Advertisements would state the films artistry or that it was one of the best three-reel films released. Lombardi cites a single review from The Moving Picture World in his text and suggests that other reviews may have been more tepid, but the result was that Dwan would not produce any more films of "such experimental nature" at Universal. The film is now considered to be lost. It is unknown when the film was lost, but if it was in Universal's vaults it would have been deliberately destroyed along with the remaining copies of Universal's silent era films in 1948.

== Notes ==
Pauline Bush's role has been the subject of some dispute, but a contemporary account also states her role as the wife. William Worthington's role was also noted by a later contemporary account.
