= For the Crown =

1913 film

- Directed by: Lorimer Johnston
- Produced by: Lorimer Johnston (Scenario)
- Starring: Charlotte Burton; Helen Armstrong; J. Warren Kerrigan
- Distributed by: Mutual Film
- Release date: September 18, 1913
- Country: United States
- Languages: Silent film English intertitles

For the Crown is a 1913 American silent short film written and directed by Lorimer Johnston. The drama stars Charlotte Burton, Helen Armstrong, J. Warren Kerrigan, Louise Lester, George Periolat, Jack Richardson, and Vivian Rich.
