= J. Warren Kerrigan =

American actor (1879–1947)

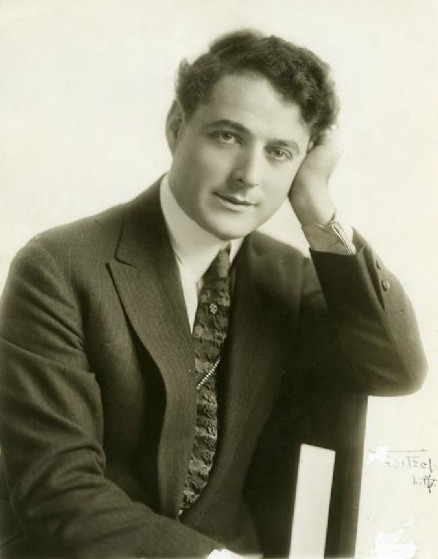
- Kerrigan c. 1918
- Born: George Jack Warren Kerrigan; July 28, 1879; Louisville, Kentucky, U.S.
- Died: June 9, 1947 (aged 67); Balboa Beach, California, U.S.
- Burial place: Forest Lawn Memorial Park
- Other name: Jack Kerrigan
- Occupations: Actor, director
- Years active: 1910–1924
- Partner: James Carroll Vincent (c. 1914–1947; his death)

George Jack Warren Kerrigan (July 25, 1879 – June 9, 1947) was an American silent film actor and film director.

== Controversy ==
In May 1917, Kerrigan was nearing the end of a four-month-long personal appearance publicity tour that had taken him across the United States and into Canada. At one of the final stops, a reporter for The Denver Times asked Kerrigan if he would be joining the war. Kerrigan replied:

I am not going to war. I will go, of course, if my country needs me, but I think that first they should take the great mass of men who aren't good for anything else, or are only good for the lower grades of work. Actors, musicians, great writers, artists of every kind—isn't it a pity when people are sacrificed who are capable of such things—of adding to the beauty of the world.

Picked up and reprinted in newspapers across the country, this statement stunned his fans and his popularity plummeted, never to fully recover.

Family members later claimed in Behind the Screen (2001) by William J. Mann that his slump in popularity was more due to his living with his mother and partner James Vincent in the same house, and not having a business manager to overcome the negative publicity.

== Revival ==
In the spring of 1924, after John Barrymore bowed out, Kerrigan was assigned the starring role in Captain Blood. While the film was a moderate success, critics were unmoved and Kerrigan found himself working less and less and in smaller roles. In December 1924, Kerrigan was injured in an automobile accident in Illinois. According to the Des Moines Tribune (page 1, Monday, December 8, 1924) his face was badly scarred and it was stated that "he may never star in films again".

== Personal life and death ==
Kerrigan lived with his domestic partner James Carroll Vincent from about 1914 until Kerrigan's death in 1947.

=== James Carroll Vincent ===
James Carroll Vincent (November 9, 1897 – May 15, 1948) was a silent movie actor. He was born in Baltimore, Maryland, and moved to California to be an actor where he met Kerrigan. Vincent moved into Kerrigan's home at 2307 Cahuenga Boulevard in Los Angeles, where they began a long-term relationship. He was listed at various times as Kerrigan's secretary or gardener. Not to be confused with actor James Vincent, born in 1882 and only three years younger than Kerrigan, while his partner is described as being much younger than Kerrigan; or stage manager James Vincent (who worked with Katharine Cornell and was long-time friend of George Cukor), born in 1900 who committed suicide in 1953 in New York City.

In 1919 Vincent, who was a "juvenile" actor with Bessie Barriscale, appeared in the cast of Out of Court, in 1920 he was in the cast of The Coast of Opportunity and in 1924 in the cast of $30,000, all three of them movies with or by Kerrigan. In 1924, Kerrigan and Vincent, along with several of their friends, were in an automobile accident in Dixon, Illinois, on the route from Sterling to Chicago. In news reports Vincent was again named as Kerrigan's secretary.

On June 9, 1947, Kerrigan died from pneumonia at the age of 67. He is buried at Forest Lawn Memorial Park in Glendale, California.

After Kerrigan's death, Vincent married Mitty Lee Turner (1894–1968) on October 24, 1947. On March 15, 1948, Vincent committed suicide by gas in his bedroom at 14716 Magnolia Boulevard in Van Nuys, California, nine months after the death of Kerrigan. He is buried at Forest Lawn Memorial Park in Glendale, California.

== Filmography ==
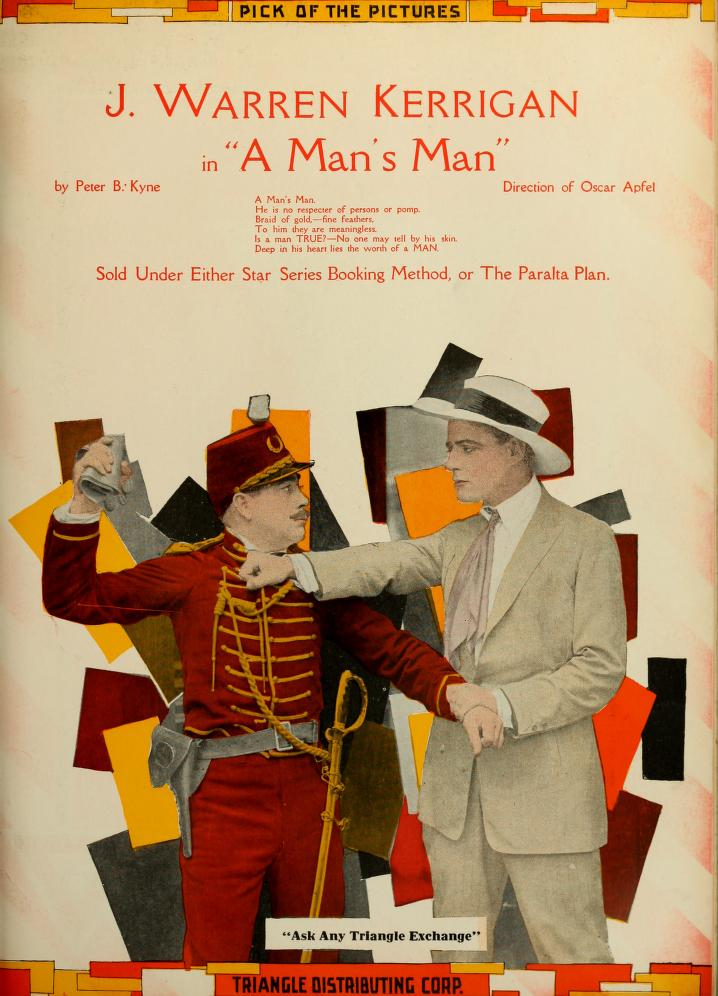
A Man's Man (1917)

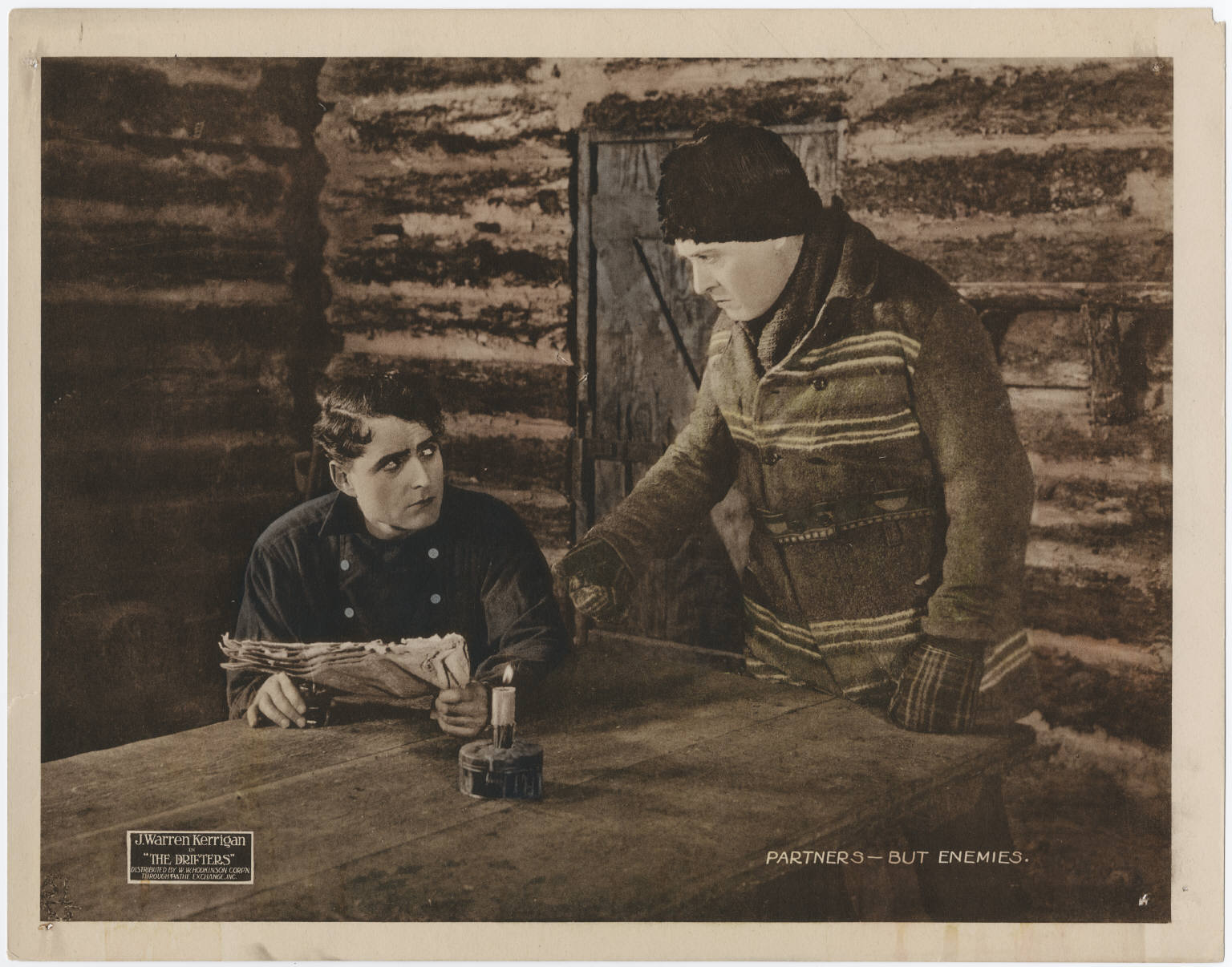
Lobby card with Kerrigan (left) in The Drifters (1919)

Year	Title	Role	Notes
1913	Calamity Anne's Inheritance	Williams - the Mining Agent	Short
1913	Calamity Anne's Vanity	One of the Village Belle's Sweethearts	Short
1913	Calamity Anne's Beauty	The Handsome Young Drummer	Short
1913	Woman's Honor	Father Bob	Short
1913	Her Big Story	Joel Hammond - the Managing Editor	Short
1913	Quicksands	Frank	Short
1913	Truth in the Wilderness	Bruce Willard	Short
1913	For the Flag	Lieutenant Jack Bronson	Short
1913	For the Crown	Jacques le Grand	Short
1913	Calamity Anne, Heroine	Minor Role	Short
1913	The Restless Spirit	The Husband - the Restless Spirit	Short
1913	The Girl and the Greaser	Dave Lewis	Short
1913	The Tale of the Ticker	Tom Burns	Short
1913	Back to Life	Destiny's Victim	Short
1913	Rory o' the Bogs	Rory o' the Bogs	Short
1914	Samson	Samson	
1915	The Stool Pigeon	Walter Jason	Short
1915	For Cash	Arthen Owen	Short
1915	The Oyster Dredger	Jack, the Oyster Dredger	Short
1915	The New Adventures of Terence O'Rourke	Terence O'Rourke	
1916	Langdon's Legacy	Langdon	
1916	The Pool of Flame	Terence O'Rourke	
1916	The Gay Lord Waring	Lord Arthur Waring	
1916	A Son of the Immortals	Prince Alexis Delgrade	
1916	The Silent Battle	Tom Gallatin	
1916	The Beckoning Trail	Carter Raymond	
1916	The Social Buccaneer	Chattfield Bruce	
1916	The Measure of a Man	John Fairmeadow	
1917	A Man's Man	John Stuart Webster	
1918	The Turn of a Card	Jimmie Montgomery Farrell	
1918	One Dollar Bid	Toby	
1918	A Burglar for a Night	Kirk Marden	
1918	Prisoners of the Pines	Hillaire Latour	
1918	Three X Gordon	Harold Gordon	
1919	The Drifters	Burke Marston	
1919	Come Again Smith	Joe Smith	
1919	The End of the Game	Burke Allister	
1919	The Best Man	Cyril Gordon	
1919	A White Man's Chance	Donald Joseph Blenhorn	
1919	The Lord Loves the Irish	Miles Machree	
1919	The Joyous Liar	Burke Harlan	
1920	Live Sparks	Neil Sparks	
1920	The Dream Cheater	Brandon McShane	
1920	A Man's Man	John Stuart Webster	
1920	Number 99	Arthur Penryn	
1920	The Green Flame	Frank Markham	
1920	$30,000	John Trask	
1920	The House of Whispers	Spaulding Nelson	
1920	The Coast of Opportunity	Dick Bristow	
1922	Night Life in Hollywood	Himself	Cameo
1923	The Covered Wagon	Will Banion	
1923	The Girl of the Golden West	Ramerrez	
1923	Mary of the Movies	Himself	Cameo, Uncredited
1923	Hollywood	Himself	Cameo
1923	The Man from Brodney's	Hollingsworth Chase	
1923	Thundering Dawn	Jack Standish	
1924	Captain Blood	Captain Peter Blood	(final film role)
