= The Greater Love =

1913 film by Allan Dwan

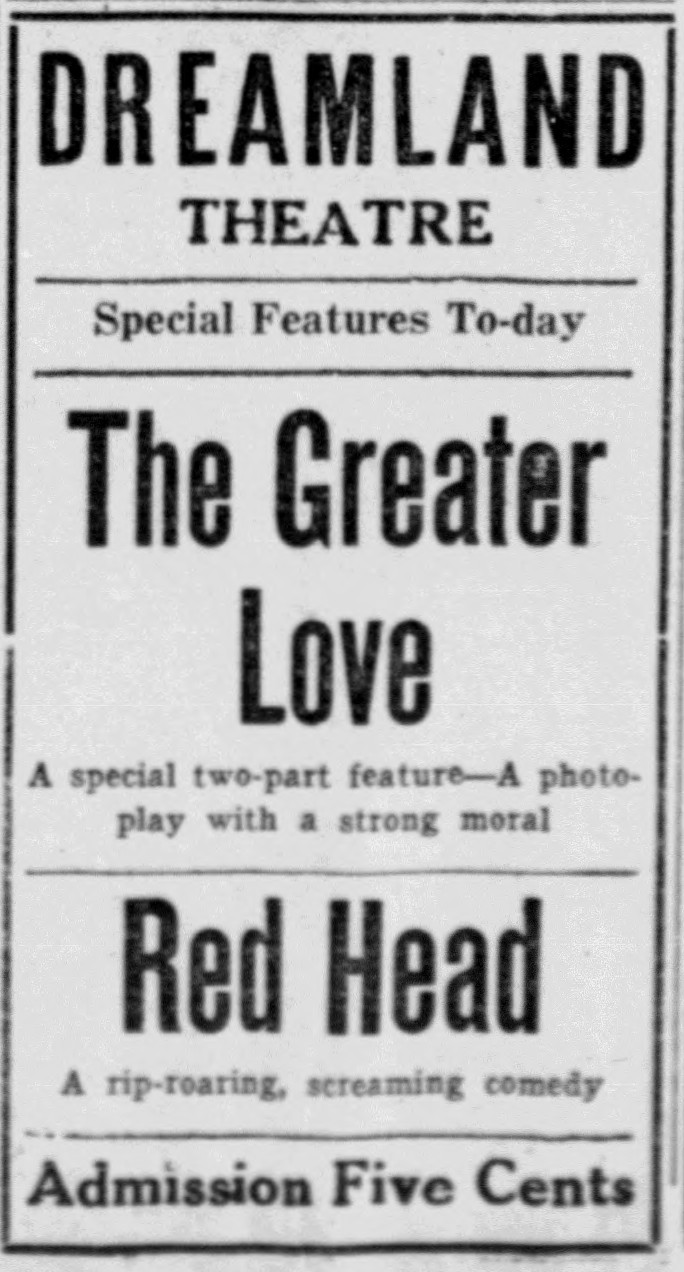
- Newspaper advertisement
- Directed by: Allan Dwan
- Starring: Charlotte Burton; Mabel Brown; Edward Coxen
- Distributed by: Mutual Film
- Release date: March 3, 1913
- Country: United States
- Languages: Silent film English intertitles

The Greater Love is a 1913 American silent short drama film, directed by Allan Dwan, and starring Charlotte Burton and Mabel Brown and Edward Coxen.
