= Back to Life (1913 film) =

1913 film by Allan Dwan

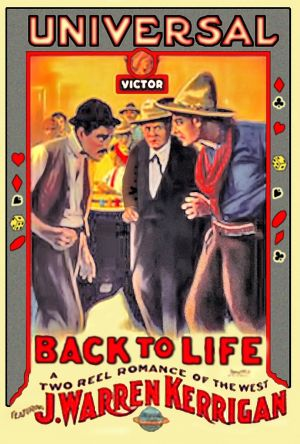
- Theatrical poster to Back to Life
- Directed by: Allan Dwan
- Written by: M. de la Parelle
- Story by: M. de la Parelle
- Starring: Pauline Bush; J. Warren Kerrigan; Lon Chaney; William Worthington
- Production company: Victor Film Company
- Distributed by: Universal Film Manufacturing Company
- Release date: November 24, 1913
- Running time: 20 minutes (2 reels)
- Country: United States
- Languages: Silent; English intertitles

Back to Life is a 1913 American silent short drama film directed by Allan Dwan and featuring Pauline Bush, J. Warren Kerrigan, William Worthington and Lon Chaney. This was Chaney's first film with director Allan Dwan, which was followed by a dozen more. The film is now considered lost.

== Plot ==
A gambler brings his sick wife to live in the mountains after learning she has tuberculosis and will need special care. The gambler soon tires of caring for his wife and becomes attached to a young girl at a local saloon.

The gambler's wife discovers her husband's infidelity and wanders off into the forest to die. There she finds a hunted outlaw named Jim, weak from loss of blood, and she nurses him back to health. Jim, in turn, takes her to an old couple in the hills, who then nurse her back to health.

The wife decides to try to regain her husband's love, but upon returning home, she finds he has been shot dead by a rival in a saloon brawl. She goes back to Jim who has left behind his days as an outlaw, and they find happiness together.

== Cast ==
- William Worthington as The Gambler
- Pauline Bush as The Wife
- J. Warren Kerrigan as Jim, The Outlaw
- Jessalyn Van Trump as The Dance Hall Girl
- Lon Chaney as The Rival

== Reception ==
Moving Picture World wrote: "Warren Kerrigan, as a redeemed bad man in this admirable picture, presents a likable character...The story is well dramatized, the action is spirited and the whole gets over in good shape."

Universal Weekly wrote: "Like all of director Allan Dwan's features, it has tons of action throughout."
