= Woman's Honor =

1913 film by Allan Dwan

- Directed by: Alan Dwan
- Starring: Charlotte Burton; Louise Lester
- Distributed by: Mutual Film
- Release date: April 12, 1913
- Country: United States
- Languages: Silent film English intertitles

Women's Honor is a 1913 American silent drama feature film directed by Alan Dwan and starring Charlotte Burton, Louise Lester, J. Warren Kerrigan, and Jack Richardson.
