= Headin' North (1921 film) =

1921 film

- Directed by: Charles Bartlett
- Written by: Barney Furey
- Starring: Pete Morrison; Gladys Cooper; Dorothy Dickson
- Distributed by: Arrow Film Corporation
- Release date: March 1921
- Running time: 50 minutes
- Country: United States
- Languages: Silent; English intertitles

Headin' North is a 1921 American silent Western film directed by Charles Bartlett and starring Pete Morrison, Gladys Cooper and Dorothy Dickson.

== Cast ==
- Pete Morrison as Bob Ryan
- Jack Walters as Arthur Stowell
- Gladys Cooper as Madge Mullin
- Dorothy Dickson as Frances Wilson
- William Dills as Hank Wilson
- Barney Furey as The Boob
- Will Frank as Madge's Father

== Bibliography ==
- Connelly, Robert B. The Silents: Silent Feature Films, 1910-36, Volume 40, Issue 2. December Press, 1998.
- Munden, Kenneth White. The American Film Institute Catalog of Motion Pictures Produced in the United States, Part 1. University of California Press, 1997.
