= Calamity Anne's Vanity =

1913 film

- Directed by: Allan Dwan
- Starring: Louise Lester; J. Warren Kerrigan; Charlotte Burton
- Distributed by: Mutual Film
- Release date: February 8, 1913
- Country: United States
- Languages: Silent; English intertitles

Calamity Anne's Vanity is a 1913 American short silent Western film directed by Allan Dwan. It stars Louise Lester as Calamity Anne, with J. Warren Kerrigan and Charlotte Burton. It was one of fifteen short films in which Lester played a lovable cowgirl character.

== Cast ==
- Louise Lester as Calamity Anne
- J. Warren Kerrigan
- Charlotte Burton
- Robert Lane
- Rose Lathan
- Jack Richardson
- Jessalyn Van Trump
