= Nicholas Power (projector manufacturer) =

American film projector manufacturer (1854-1921)

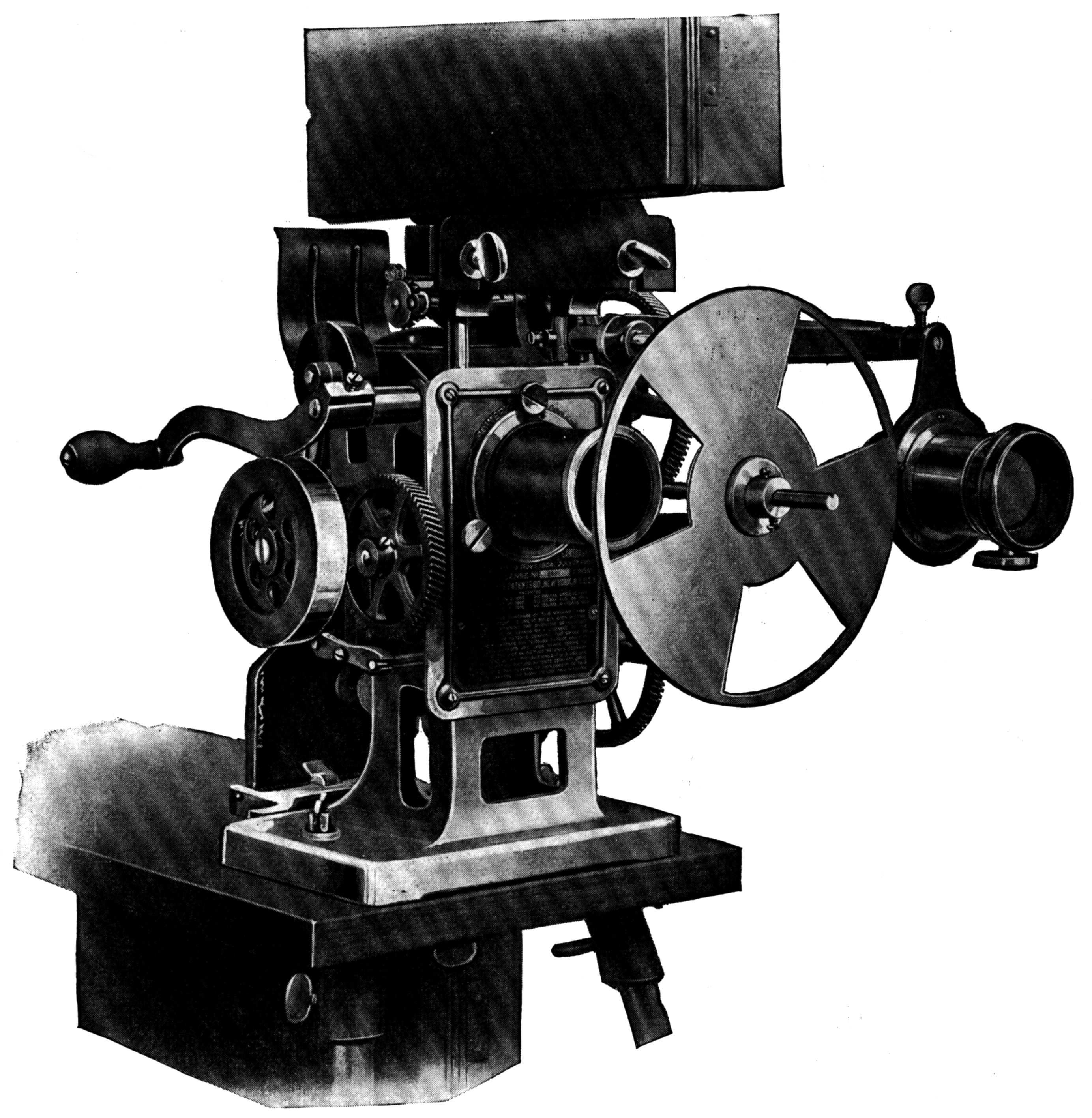
Mechanism of Power's No. 6 Cameragraph, Showing the Three-Wing, Outside Shutter.

Nicholas Power (October 22, 1854–February 7, 1921) was one of the most successful manufacturers of film projectors in the silent era, creating some of the earliest commercial projectors. He began his career working in theaters in the 1890s, and taking apart Edison projectors to learn how they worked. He soon launched a repair shop for Edison projectors as he developed his own. His great improvement on the Edison models was inventing a projector that didn't flicker. The Silent Cinema Society features a copy of his 1916 "Cameragraph" catalog, for a projector he patented in 1906, from the holdings of the Hoboken Historical Museum. He died in Palm Beach, Florida, shortly after his retirement, at age 66, and The New York Times called him "an important contributor to the advancement of cinematography."
