= List of lost silent films (1920–1924) =

This is a list of lost silent films released from 1920 to 1924.

Year	Film	Director	Cast	Notes	Ref
1920	Abend – Nacht – Morgen (Evening – Night – Morning)	F. W. Murnau	Gertrude Welcker, Bruno Ziener, Conrad Veidt		
1920	The Amazing Quest of Mr. Ernest Bliss	Henry Edwards	Henry Edwards, Chrissie White	On the BFI "75 Most Wanted" lost film list. The last copy is thought to have been destroyed in a bonfire during World War II by Edwards and White as storing it posed a fire hazard.	
1920	Anna the Adventuress	Cecil M. Hepworth	Alma Taylor	Taylor plays identical twins.	
1920	Bonnie May	Ida May Park, Joseph De Grasse	Bessie Love		
1920	Bride 13	Richard Stanton	Marguerite Clayton, John B. O'Brien	A 15-part serial.	
1920	The Brute	Oscar Micheaux	Evelyn Preer		
1920	Der Bucklige und die Tänzerin (The Hunchback and the Dancer)	F. W. Murnau	Sascha Gura, John Gottowt		
1920	The Devil's Pass Key	Erich von Stroheim	Leo White, Mae Busch	Negative depiction of Americans led some to suggest Stroheim be deported from the United States.	
1920	The Dragon's Net	Henry MacRae	Marie Walcamp, Harland Tucker	An adventure serial with 12 episodes.	
1920	Fantômas	Edward Sedgwick	Edward Roseman, Edna Murphy	A 20-chapter American serial.	
1920	The Fatal Sign	Stuart Paton	Claire Anderson, Harry Carter	A serial with 14 episodes.	
1920	The Flaming Disc	Robert F. Hill	Elmo Lincoln, Louise Lorraine	An 18-part serial.	
1920	The Girl in Number 29	John Ford	Frank Mayo		
1920	Hitchin' Posts	John Ford	Frank Mayo		
1920	The Invisible Ray	Harry A. Pollard	Ruth Clifford, Jack Sherrill	A 15-part serial.	
1920	Der Januskopf (The Head of Janus)	F. W. Murnau	Conrad Veidt, Magnus Stifter, Margarete Schlegel	An adaptation of Strange Case of Dr Jekyll and Mr Hyde.	
1920	King of the Circus	J. P. McGowan	Eddie Polo, Corrine Porter	An 18-part serial.	
1920	The $1,000,000 Reward	George Lessey	Coit Albertson	A 15-episode serial.	
1920	Il mostro di Frankenstein	Eugenio Testa	Luciano Albertini, Umberto Guarracino	The third film based upon the novel of Frankenstein and probably the first ever Italian horror/science fiction film. Severely cut by censorship board before theatrical release.	
1920	The Paliser Case	William Parke	Pauline Frederick		
1920	Passion's Playground	J. A. Barry	Katherine MacDonald, Norman Kerry, Nell Craig		
1920	Pegeen	David Smith	Bessie Love		
1920	Pirate Gold	George B. Seitz	Marguerite Courtot, George B. Seitz	A ten-part serial.	
1920	The Prince of Avenue A	John Ford	James J. Corbett, Richard Cummings		
1920	The Purple Cipher	Chester Bennett	Earle Williams, Vola Vale, Ernest Shields	This film is listed in the American Silent Feature Film Survival Database, but no holdings are located in the archives.	
1920	Remodeling Her Husband	Lillian Gish	Dorothy Gish, James Rennie	The only movie Lillian Gish directed.	
1920	Romance	Chester Withey	Doris Keane, Basil Sydney		
1920	The Screaming Shadow	Ben F. Wilson, Duke Worne	Ben F. Wilson, Neva Gerber	A serial of 15 episodes.	
1920	The Shadow of Lightning Ridge	Wilfred Lucas	Snowy Baker, Agnes Vernon		
1920	A Slave of Vanity	Henry Otto	Pauline Frederick		
1920	A Son of David	Hay Plumb	Poppy Wyndham, Ronald Colman, Arthur Walcott		
1920	Thunderbolt Jack	Francis Ford, Murdock MacQuarrie	Jack Hoxie, Marin Sais	A ten-part serial.	
1920	Trailed by Three	Perry N. Vekroff	Stuart Holmes, Frankie Mann	A 15-part serial.	
1920	Treasure Island	Maurice Tourneur	Shirley Mason, Charles Ogle, Lon Chaney	A lavish production of the Stevenson novel, reportedly with some color sequences.	
1920	The Vanishing Dagger	Edward A. Kull, John F. Magowan, Eddie Polo	Eddie Polo, Thelma Percy	An 18-part serial.	
1920	Vanishing Trails	Leon De La Mothe	Franklyn Farnum, Mary Anderson	A serial with 15 episodes	
1920	Wuthering Heights	A.V. Bramble	Milton Rosmer, Colette Brettel, Warwick Ward	The first film adaptation of Wuthering Heights.	
1921	Action	John Ford	Hoot Gibson		
1921	The Adventures of Mr. Pickwick	Thomas Bentley	Frederick Volpe, Mary Brough, Bransby Williams	One of the BFI 75 Most Wanted.	
1921	Appearances	Donald Crisp	David Powell		
1921	The Avenging Arrow	William Bowman, W. S. Van Dyke	John Big Tree		
1921	Bits of Life	Marshall Neilan	Lon Chaney, Noah Beery, Sr., Anna May Wong	The first anthology film.	
1921	The Blue Mountains Mystery	Raymond Longford, Lottie Lyell	Marjorie Osborne, John Faulkner		
1921	Dangerous Lies	Paul Powell	David Powell	Alfred Hitchcock is credited as a title designer.	
1921	Desperate Trails	John Ford	Harry Carey		
1921	Do or Die	J. P. McGowan	Eddie Polo, Magda Lane	An 18-episode serial.	
1921	Experience	George Fitzmaurice	Richard Barthelmess, Lilyan Tashman, Marjorie Daw	Allegory in which all the characters are named for a human Certainty or Approximation.	
1921	Forever	George Fitzmaurice	Elsie Ferguson, Wallace Reid	Film version of George du Maurier novel Peter Ibbetson.	
1921	The Freeze-Out	John Ford	Harry Carey		
1921	The Great Reward	Francis Ford	Francis Ford, Ella Hall	A 15-episode serial.	
1921	The Gunsaulus Mystery	Oscar Micheaux	Evelyn Preer	Inspired by the 1913 murder of Mary Phagan.	
1921	The Honor of Rameriz	Robert North Bradbury	Tom Santschi, Bessie Love, Ruth Stonehouse		
1921	Humor Risk	Richard Smith	Marx Brothers	The first Marx Brothers film. This short two-reeler is not believed to have been shown more than once theatrically, if at all.	
1921	Hurricane Hutch	George B. Seitz	Charles Hutchison	A 15-episode serial.	
1921	The Jackeroo of Coolabong	Wilfred Lucas	Snowy Baker, Kathleen Key		
1921	Jackie	John Ford	Shirley Mason, William Scott		
1921	Know Thy Child	Franklyn Barrett	Roland Conway, Nada Conrade, Lotus Thompson	Thompson's film debut came in this Australian production.	
1921	Ladies Must Live	George Loane Tucker	Betty Compson, Mahlon Hamilton, Leatrice Joy, John Gilbert		
1921	The Lotus Eater	Marshall Neilan	John Barrymore, Colleen Moore	Tropical scenes filmed partly on Catalina Island, and in Florida.	
1921	The Narrow Valley	Cecil Hepworth	Alma Taylor, George Dewhurst, James Carew	On the BFI 75 Most Wanted list.	
1921	The Offenders	Fenwicke L. Holmes	Margery Wilson, Percy Helton		
1921	Penny of Top Hill Trail	Arthur Berthelet	Bessie Love		
1921	Rudd's New Selection	Raymond Longford	J. P. O'Neill, Tal Ordell, Lottie Lyell		
1921	The Secret Four	Albert Russell, Perry N. Vekroff	Eddie Polo, Kathleen Myers	A 15-episode serial.	
1921	Sehnsucht (Desire)	F. W. Murnau	Conrad Veidt		
1921	Sentimental Tommy	John S. Robertson	Gareth Hughes	One of the biggest Paramount hits of 1921.	
1921	The Sky Ranger	George B. Seitz	George B. Seitz, June Caprice	A serial with 15 episodes.	
1921	The Spirit of the Lake	Robert North Bradbury	Tom Santschi, Bessie Love, Ruth Stonehouse		
1921	Terror Trail	Edward A. Kull	Eileen Sedgwick, George Larkin	An 18-part serial.	
1921	Uncharted Seas	Wesley Ruggles	Alice Lake, Carl Gerard, Rudolph Valentino		
1921	The Wallop	John Ford	Harry Carey		
1921	Winners of the West	Edward Laemmle	Art Acord; Myrtle Lind	A serial in 18 parts.	
1922	The Beautiful and Damned	William A. Seiter	Kenneth Harlan, Marie Prevost	F. Scott Fitzgerald's second novel, adapted and produced by Warner Bros. Pictures. Six lobby cards are extant.	
1922	Brawn of the North	Laurence Trimble, Jane Murfin	Irene Rich, Strongheart (a dog)		
1922	A Blind Bargain	Wallace Worsley	Lon Chaney	Negative destroyed by MGM in 1931. Last surviving print lost in 1965 MGM vault fire.	
1922	Clarence	William C. deMille	Wallace Reid; Adolphe Menjou		
1922	Forget Me Not	W. S. Van Dyke	Bessie Love, Gareth Hughes		
1922	In the Days of Buffalo Bill	Edward Laemmle	Art Acord, Duke R. Lee	An 18-episode Western serial.	
1922	Little Miss Smiles	John Ford	Shirley Mason, Gaston Glass		
1922	Nan of the North	Duke Worne	Ann Little, Tom London	A 15-episode serial.	
1922	One Glorious Day	James Cruze	Will Rogers	Possibility of a nitrate print surviving in a European film archive.	
1922	Perils of the Yukon	Jay Marchant, J. P. McGowan, Perry N. Vekroff	William Desmond, Laura La Plante	A serial with 15 chapters.	
1922	The Power of Love	Henry MacRae	Elliot Sparling, Barbara Bedford, Noah Beery, Aileen Manning, Albert Prisco, John Herdman	The first feature length 3D film is lost. The fate of the 1923 2D version, titled Forbidden Lover, is unknown.	
1922	Quincy Adams Sawyer	Clarence G. Badger	John Bowers, Blanche Sweet, Lon Chaney, Barbara La Marr		
1922	A Rough Passage	Franklyn Barrett	Stella Southern, Hayford Hobbs		
1922	Silver Wings	Edwin Carewe, John Ford	Mary Carr, Lynn Hammond		
1922	Trifling Women	Rex Ingram	Barbara La Marr, Ramón Novarro		
1922	The Vermilion Pencil	Norman Dawn	Sessue Hayakawa, Ann May, Bessie Love, Sidney Franklin		
1922	The Virgin of the Seminole	Oscar Micheaux			
1922	The Wise Kid	Tod Browning	Gladys Walton, David Butler		
1922	With Stanley in Africa	William James Craft, Edward A. Kull	George Walsh, Louise Lorraine	An 18-chapter serial.	
1922	The Young Diana	Robert G. Vignola	Marion Davies, Forrest Stanley		
1923	Around the World in 18 Days	B. Reeves Eason, Robert F. Hill	William Desmond, Laura La Plante	A 12-part serial.	
1923	Die Austreibung (The Expulsion)	F. W. Murnau	Carl Goetz		
1923	The Blue Lagoon	William Weston Bowden, Dick Cruikshanks	Molly Adair, Arthur Pusey, Dick Cruikshanks	Shot on the coast of Mozambique. The first adaptation of Henry De Vere Stacpoole's novel.	
1923	The Courtship of Miles Standish	Frederick Sullivan	Charles Ray	Production bankrupted actor Charles Ray and nearly ended his movie career. A full size replica of the Mayflower was built for this film.	
1923	The Daring Years	Kenneth Webb	Mildred Harris, Charles Emmett Mack, Clara Bow		
1923	Drakula halála (Dracula's Death or The Death of Dracula)	Károly Lajthay	Paul Askonas, Lene Myl	The first or second filmed version of the Dracula story to enter production (the existence of a 1920 Soviet film titled Drakula is in doubt), this Hungarian movie's production preceded Nosferatu by over a year, though its earliest confirmed screenings weren't until 1923.	
1923	The Eternal City	George Fitzmaurice	Lionel Barrymore, Barbara La Marr, Bert Lytell	Partly shot in Rome.	
1923	The Eternal Three	Marshall Neilan, Frank Urson	Hobart Bosworth, Claire Windsor, Bessie Love	Though the film is lost, a short production scene including Neilan, Bosworth, Windsor, and Raymond Griffith appears in Souls for Sale, another 1923 film featuring numerous Hollywood cameos and supposed "behind the scenes"-style filmmaking sequences.	
1923	The Face on the Bar-Room Floor	John Ford	Henry B. Walthall, Ruth Clifford		
1923	The Fighting Skipper	Francis Ford	Peggy O'Day, Jack Perrin	A 15-part adventure serial.	
1923	Gentle Julia	Rowland V. Lee	Bessie Love		
1923	The Ghost City	Jay Marchant	Pete Morrison		
1923	The Ghost Patrol	Nat Ross	Ralph Graves, Bessie Love		
1923	Hollywood	James Cruze		Dozens of cameos of silent film stars playing themselves, including Mary Pickford, Douglas Fairbanks, Gloria Swanson, Will Rogers, Mary Astor, Cecil B. DeMille and Charlie Chaplin.	
1923	Hoodman Blind	John Ford	David Butler, Gladys Hulette		
1923	Human Wreckage	John Griffith Wray	Dorothy Davenport, Bessie Love	Early portrayal of drug addiction (then a taboo subject), based on actor Wallace Reid, Davenport's husband.	
1923	Lily of the Alley	Henry Edwards	Henry Edwards, Chrissie White	On the BFI 75 Most Wanted missing films.	
1923	The Oregon Trail	Edward Laemmle	Art Acord, Louise Lorraine	A Western serial in 18 episodes.	
1923	Paddy the Next Best Thing	Graham Cutts	Mae Marsh, Darby Foster, Lilian Douglas		
1923	Paganini	Heinz Goldberg	Conrad Veidt, Greta Schröder		
1923	The Phantom Fortune	Robert F. Hill	William Desmond, Esther Ralston	A 12-episode serial.	
1923	The Purple Dawn	Charles R. Seeling	Bessie Love, Bert Sprotte, William E. Aldrich		
1923	Ruth of the Range	Ernest C. Warde	Ruth Roland, Bruce Gordon, Lorimer Johnston	A serial comprising 15 episodes.	
1923	The Santa Fe Trail	Ashton Dearholt, Robert Dillon	Jack Perrin, Neva Gerber		
1923	St. Elmo	Jerome Storm	John Gilbert, Barbara La Marr, Bessie Love		
1923	The Social Buccaneer	Robert F. Hill	Jack Mulhall, Margaret Livingston	A serial consisting of ten episodes.	
1923	Three Jumps Ahead	John Ford	Tom Mix, Alma Bennett		
1923	Three Who Paid	Colin Campbell	Dustin Farnum, Bessie Love, Frank Campeau		
1923	Vanity Fair	Hugo Ballin	Mabel Ballin	Produced by Samuel Goldwyn with Prizmacolor sequence.	
1923	La voyante (The Clairvoyant)	Leon Abrams, Louis Mercanton	Sarah Bernhardt, Georges Melchior, Harry Baur	This was Bernhardt's last performance, and was made while she was mortally ill. The Cinémathèque Française is rumored to have a print.	
1923	Where the Pavement Ends	Rex Ingram	Ramón Novarro, Alice Terry	Filmed in Florida and Cuba.	
1923	Woman to Woman	Graham Cutts	Betty Compson	The assistant director was Alfred Hitchcock.	
1923	The World's Applause	William C. deMille	Bebe Daniels		
1924	The Alaskan	Herbert Brenon	Thomas Meighan, Estelle Taylor	An early role for Anna May Wong.	
1924	Babbitt	Harry Beaumont	Willard Louis, Mary Alden, Carmel Myers	First film adaptation of Sinclair Lewis novel.	
1924	The City of Beautiful Nonsense	Henry Edwards	Henry Edwards, Chrissie White, James Lindsay	The last copy is thought to have been destroyed in a bonfire during World War II by Edwards and White as storing it posed a fire hazard.	
1924	Countess Donelli	Georg Wilhelm Pabst	Paul Hansen, Henny Porten		
1924	The Dangerous Flirt	Tod Browning	Evelyn Brent, Edward Earle		
1924	Dynamite Smith	Ralph Ince	Charles Ray, Bessie Love, Wallace Beery		
1924	Feet of Clay	Cecil B. DeMille	Rod La Rocque, Vera Reynolds, Julia Faye, Ricardo Cortez, William Boyd	This is one of astute preservationist DeMille's rare lost films.	
1924	The Fortieth Door	George B. Seitz	Allene Ray, Bruce Gordon	A serial with ten episodes.	
1924	Galloping Hoofs	George B. Seitz	Allene Ray, Johnnie Walker	A ten-part Western serial.	
1924	The Girl in the Limousine	Larry Semon, Noel M. Smith	Oliver Hardy		
1924	Hearts of Oak	John Ford	Hobart Bosworth, Pauline Starke		
1924	Into the Net	George B. Seitz	Edna Murphy, Jack Mulhall	A serial with ten episodes.	
1924	Joe	Beaumont Smith	Arthur Tauchert, Marie Lorraine	Lorraine's film debut.	
1924	The Treasure of Atahualpa (El tesoro de Atahualpa)	Augusto San Miguel	Augusto San Miguel, Evelina Orellana, Anita Cortés, Julieta Stanford	First Ecuadorian feature film.	
1924	Leatherstocking	George B. Seitz	Edna Murphy, Harold Miller	A ten-part serial.	
1924	Married Flirts	Robert Vignola	Pauline Frederick, Mae Busch, Conrad Nagel		
1924	Merton of the Movies	James Cruze	Glenn Hunter, Viola Dana	Named by the New York Times as one of the ten best films of 1924.	
1924	Miami	Alan Crosland	Betty Compson, Hedda Hopper		
1924	Miss Suwanna of Siam	Henry MacRae	Sa-ngiam Navisthira, Yom Mongkolnat, Mongkol Sumonnat	Some promotional materials and other ephemera are held by the Thailand National Film Archive.	
1924	My Husband's Wives	Maurice Elvey	Shirley Mason		
1924	Pokhozdeniya Oktyabriny (The Adventures of Oktyabrina)	Grigori Kozintsev, Leonid Trauberg	Zinaida Torkhovskaya, Yevgeni Kumeiko	A Soviet film believed to have been lost in a 1925 fire.	
1924	Reveille	George Pearson	Betty Balfour	On the BFI 75 Most Wanted list.	
1924	The Silent Watcher	Frank Lloyd	Glenn Hunter, Bessie Love		
1924	The Snob	Monta Bell	John Gilbert, Norma Shearer, Conrad Nagel		
1924	So Big	Charles Brabin	Colleen Moore		
1924	A Son of Satan	Oscar Micheaux	Andrew Bishop, Lawrence Chenault, Shingzie Howard, Edna Morton	Ran into distribution problems when state censorship boards rejected the film based on its contents.	
1924	Sundown	Laurence Trimble, Harry O. Hoyt	Bessie Love		
1924	Ten Scars Make a Man	William Parke	Allene Ray, Jack Mower	A ten-part serial.	
1924	Tess of the d'Urbervilles	Marshall Neilan	Blanche Sweet, Conrad Nagel, Stuart Holmes		
1924	Those Who Dance	Lambert Hillyer	Blanche Sweet, Bessie Love, Warner Baxter		
1924	Tongues of Flame	Joseph Henabery	Thomas Meighan, Bessie Love		
1924	Torment	Maurice Tourneur	Bessie Love, Owen Moore, Jean Hersholt		
1924	Trouble Brewing	James D. Davis, Larry Semon	Larry Semon, Carmelita Geraghty, Oliver Hardy		
1924	Wanderer of the Wasteland	Irvin Willat	Jack Holt, Noah Beery, Billie Dove	First western filmed in Technicolor.	
1924	The Way of a Man	George B. Seitz	Allene Ray, Harold Miller	A serial composed of ten episodes.	
1924	White Man	Louis J. Gasnier	Alice Joyce, Kenneth Harlan, Walter Long (actor)	Clark Gable made his first film appearance in a minor role in this jungle adventure.	
1924	Who Is the Man?	Walter Summers	John Gielgud, Isobel Elsom	Gielgud's screen debut. On the BFI 75 Most Wanted list.	
1924	Wine	Louis J. Gasnier	Clara Bow, Robert Agnew, Walter Long	Clara Bow's first starring role.	
1924	The Wolf Man	Edmund Mortimer	John Gilbert, Norma Shearer		
1924	Wolves of the North	William Duncan	William Duncan, Edith Johnson	A ten-chapter serial.	
1924	The Woman on the Jury	Harry Hoyt	Sylvia Breamer, Bessie Love		
1924	The World of Wonderful Reality	Henry Edwards	Henry Edwards, Chrissie White, James Lindsay, Henry Vibart	Last copy is thought to have been destroyed in a bonfire during World War II by Edwards and White as storing it posed a fire hazard.	
