= List of film serials =

A list of film serials by year of release.

== 1910s ==
Production company	Title	Chapters	Genre	Director	Cast	Notes
1910
Deutsche Vitaskop GmbH	Arsène Lupin contra Sherlock Holmes	5	Mystery	Viggo Larsen	Paul Otto as Lupin and Viggo Larsen as Holmes	German; based on the novel Arsène Lupin versus Herlock Sholmes by Maurice Leblanc; Survival status is unknown.
1912
Edison Studios	What Happened to Mary	12	Drama	Charles Brabin	Mary Fuller	Episodes 1–4: Survival status unclear. Episodes 5–8, 10, 11: Museum of Modern Art Episode 9: Library of Congress Episode 12: Survival status unclear Other sources indicate a print exists yet provide no specifics
1913
Selig Polyscope Company	The Adventures of Kathlyn	13	Adventure	Francis J. Grandon	Kathlyn Williams	Presumed lost. Considered to be the first "cliffhanger" serial.
Edison Studios	Who Will Marry Mary?	6	Drama	Walter Edwin	Mary Fuller	Incomplete prints of episodes one and five survive
Société des Etablissements L. Gaumont	Fantômas	5	Mystery	Louis Feuillade	René Navarre	French; Based on Fantômas by Marcel Allain and Pierre Souvestre; Print exists. Released on Blu-ray by Kino Lorber 2016.
1914
Pathé	The Perils of Pauline	20	Adventure	Louis J. Gasnier and Donald MacKenzie	Pearl White	First Pathé serial; known to exist only in a shortened 9-chapter version (approx. 214 minutes)
Wharton Studio	The Exploits of Elaine	14	Mystery	George B. Seitz	Pearl White, Arnold Daly, Sheldon Lewis	Survival status: Prints exist in the George Eastman Museum film archive [incomplete 35mm positive]; and (of some of the episodes, including episodes 8-10) [16mm reduction positives, 8mm reduction positives]
Kalem Company	The Hazards of Helen	119	Railroad	J. P. McGowan and James D. Davis	Helen Holmes and Helen Gibson	119 chapters – At 23.8 hours, this is considered to be the longest serial ever made. Each episode was about 12 minutes. Very little of it survives.
Edison Studios	The Active Life of Dolly of the Dailies	12	Girl Reporter	Walter Edwin	Mary Fuller	Only two episodes, 5 & 10, are known to exist.
	The Man Who Disappeared	12	Drama	Charles Brabin	Marc McDermott	(considered lost)
Reliance Motion Picture Studio/Mutual Film	Our Mutual Girl	52	Drama	John W. Noble, Oscar Eagle	Norma Phillips	Survival status is unknown
Thanhouser Film Corporation	The Million Dollar Mystery	23	Mystery	Howell Hansel	Florence La Badie, Marguerite Snow, James Cruze, Sidney Bracey	(considered lost)
	Zudora	20	Drama	Howell Hansel	Marguerite Snow, James Cruze	
Universal Film Manufacturing Co.	Lucille Love, Girl of Mystery	15	Spy	Francis Ford	Grace Cunard, Francis Ford	First Universal serial; an incomplete print of 4 chapters exists
	The Master Key	15	Adventure	Robert Z. Leonard	Robert Z. Leonard, Ella Hall	(only episode 5 survives in the Library of Congress)
Universal Pictures	The Trey o' Hearts	15	Crime	Wilfred Lucas and Henry MacRae	Cleo Madison, George Larkin	Based on a novel by Louis Joseph Vance (considered lost)
Lubin Manufacturing Company	The Beloved Adventurer	15	Drama	Arthur V. Johnson	Arthur V. Johnson, Lottie Briscoe	
1915
Pathé & Wharton Studio	The New Exploits of Elaine	10	Crime	Louis J. Gasnier, Leopold Wharton and Theodore Wharton	Pearl White	(considered lost)
	The Romance of Elaine	12	Spy	George B. Seitz, Leopold Wharton and Theodore Wharton	Pearl White, Lionel Barrymore, Creighton Hale	Based on the novel by Arthur B. Reeve (considered lost)
Balboa Amusement Producing Company	Neal of the Navy	14	Maritime	William Bertram and W.M. Harvey	Lillian Lorraine, William Courtleigh Jr.	(considered lost)
	The Red Circle	14	Drama	Sherwood MacDonald	Ruth Roland	(only a brief trailer survives)
American Film Manufacturing Company	The Diamond From the Sky	30	Adventure	Jacques Jaccard and William Desmond Taylor	Lottie Pickford	(considered lost)
Reliance Film Company	Runaway June	15	Drama	Oscar Eagle	Norma Phillips	
Kalem Company	The Ventures of Marguerite	16	Crime	Robert Ellis, John Mackin and Hamilton Smith	Marguerite Courtot	
Universal Film Manufacturing Co.	The Black Box	15	Mystery	Otis Turner	Herbert Rawlinson	written by E. Phillips Oppenheim; a novelization of the serial with photos was published (considered lost)
	Under the Crescent	6	Adventure	Burton L. King	Ola Humphrey	Based on the biography of actress Ola Humphrey (considered lost)
	The Broken Coin	22	Adventure	Francis Ford	Grace Cunard, Francis Ford	Based on a story by Emerson Hough (considered lost)
	Graft	20	Crime	George Lessey and Richard Stanton	Hobart Henley, Jane Novak	(considered lost)
Power Picture Plays	The Mysterious Lady Baffles and Detective Duck	11	Comedy	Allen Curtis	Gale Henry, Max Asher	
Lubin Manufacturing Company	The Road o'Strife	15	Drama	Howell Hansel and John Ince	Crane Wilbur, Mary Charleson, Jack Standing	
Signal Film Corporation	The Girl and the Game	15	Railroad	J. P. McGowan	Helen Holmes, Leo D. Maloney, J. P. McGowan	
Vitagraph Company of America	The Goddess	15	Drama	Ralph Ince	Anita Stewart	
	The Fates and Flora Fourflush	3	Comedy	Wally Van	Clara Kimball Young	
Société des Etablissements L. Gaumont	Les Vampires	10	Mystery	Louis Feuillade	Musidora	French (available on DVD)
1916
Wharton Studio	The Iron Claw	20	Mystery	George B. Seitz	Pearl White	A print of episode 7 exists
	The Mysteries of Myra	15	Horror	Leopold Wharton and Theodore Wharton	Howard Estabrook, Jean Sothern	Segments of only three chapters exist
	The Grip of Evil	14	Drama	W.A.S. Douglas and Harry Harvey	Jackie Saunders, Roland Bottomley	(considered lost)
Wharton Studio/Hearst	Beatrice Fairfax	15	Girl Reporter	Leopold Wharton and Theodore Wharton	Grace Darling, Harry Fox	Episode 1: The Missing Watchman is considered lost,(Available on DVD)
Astra Film Corporation/Pathé	The Shielding Shadow	15	Mystery	Louis J. Gasnier and Donald MacKenzie	Grace Darmond, Ralph Kellard, Léon Bary	(Only chapters 4, 10, 11, 14 and 15 exist)
	Pearl of the Army	15	War	Edward José	Pearl White	(Available on DVD)
Erbograph/Consolidated Film Company	The Crimson Stain Mystery	16	Horror	T. Hayes Hunter	Maurice Costello, Ethel Grandin	(Exists in incomplete form)
Kleine Productions Inc.	Gloria's Romance	20	Drama	Colin Campbell and Walter Edwin	Billie Burke	(considered lost)
Metro Pictures Corporation	The Great Secret	18	Mystery	Christy Cabanne	Francis X. Bushman, Beverly Bayne	(considered lost)
Deutsche Bioscop	Homunculus	6	Science fiction	Otto Rippert	Olaf Fønss	German
Société des Etablissements L. Gaumont	L'X Noir	1 chapter (40 minutes)	Crime drama	Léonce Perret	Fabienne Fabreges, Paul Manson	French
	Judex	12	Crime	Louis Feuillade	René Cresté, Musidora	French (available on DVD)
Niagara Film Studios	Perils of Our Girl Reporters	15	Girl reporter	George Terwilliger		(considered lost)
American Film Manufacturing Company	The Secret of the Submarine	15	Spy	George L. Sargent	Juanita Hansen, Tom Chatterton	(considered lost)
	The Scarlet Runner	12		William P. S. Earle and Wally Van	Earle Williams	(considered lost)
	The Sequel to the Diamond From the Sky	4	Drama	Edward Sloman	Rhea Mitchell	(considered lost)
Essanay Film Manufacturing Company.	The Strange Case of Mary Page	15	Mystery	J. Charles Haydon	Henry B. Walthall, Edna Mayo	(considered lost)
Signal Film Corporation	The Yellow Menace	16		William Steiner	Edwin Stevens	
	Lass of the Lumberlands	15	Western	J. P. McGowan	Helen Holmes	(considered lost)
Universal Film Manufacturing Co.	The Adventures of Peg o' the Ring	15	Circus	Francis Ford and Jacques Jaccard	Grace Cunard, Francis Ford	(considered lost)
	Liberty	20	Western	Henry MacRae	Marie Walcamp	First purely Western Serial ever made (considered lost)
Vitagraph Company of America	The Purple Mask	16	Mystery	Francis Ford and Grace Cunard	Grace Cunard, Francis Ford	
1917
Astra Film Corporation/Pathé	The Mystery of the Double Cross	15	Mystery	Louis J. Gasnier and William Parke	Mollie King, Léon Bary	(Available on DVD)
	The Fatal Ring	20	Crime	George B. Seitz	Pearl White	(A complete print may exist in the UCLA Film and Television Archive film archive)
	The Seven Pearls	15	Adventure	Louis J. Gasnier and Donald MacKenzie	Mollie King, Creighton Hale, Léon Bary	(only fragments exist in the Library of Congress)
	The Hidden Hand	15	Mystery	James Vincent	Doris Kenyon	(considered lost)
Balboa Amusement Producing Company	The Neglected Wife	15	Drama	William Bertram	Ruth Roland	(A complete print exists)
Wharton Studio/International Film Service Inc.	Patria	15	War	Jacques Jaccard, Leopold Wharton and Theodore Wharton	Irene Castle	Based on the novel The Last of the Fighting Channings by Louis Joseph Vance; only episodes 1-4 and 10 exist.
Signal Film Corporation	The Railroad Raiders	15	Railroad	J. P. McGowan	Helen Holmes	
	The Lost Express	15	Railroad	J. P. McGowan	Helen Holmes	
Monmouth Film Corporation	Jimmie Dale Alias the Grey Seal	16	Mystery	Harry McRae Webster	E.K. Lincoln, Doris Mitchell, Edna Hunter, Paul Panzer	
Paramount Pictures	Who Is Number One?	15	Mystery	William Bertram	Kathleen Clifford	(considered lost)
Universal Film Manufacturing Co.	Voice on the Wire	15	Mystery	Stuart Paton	Ben F. Wilson, Neva Gerber, Joseph W. Girard	(considered lost)
	The Gray Ghost	16	Mystery	Stuart Paton	Harry Carter, Priscilla Dean, Emory Johnson, Eddie Polo	(considered lost)
	The Red Ace	16	War	Jacques Jaccard	Marie Walcamp	(Only 11 of the 15 chapters exist in the Library of Congress)
	The Mystery Ship	18	Maritime	Henry MacRae	Ben F. Wilson, Neva Gerber	(considered lost)
Vitagraph Company of America	The Secret Kingdom	15	Fantasy	Charles Brabin	Charles Richman, Dorothy Kelly, Arline Pretty, Joseph Kilgour	
	The Fighting Trail	15	Western	William Duncan	William Duncan, Carol Holloway	(considered lost)
	Vengeance and the Woman	15		William Duncan and Laurence Trimble	William Duncan, Carol Holloway	
1918
Astra Film Corporation/Pathé	The House of Hate	20	Mystery	George B. Seitz	Pearl White, Antonio Moreno	(A restored version is available on DVD)
	Hands Up!	15	Western	Louis J. Gasnier and James W. Horne	Ruth Roland	(considered lost)
Western Photoplays Inc.	Wolves of Kultur	15	War	Joseph A. Golden	Leah Baird, Sheldon Lewis, Charles Hutchison	(Only 7 of the 15 chapters still exist)
Jaxon Film Corporation	A Daughter of Uncle Sam	12	War	James C. Morton		
Wharton Studio	The Eagle's Eye	20	War	George Lessey, Wellington A. Playter, Leopold Wharton and Theodore Wharton	King Baggot, Marguerite Snow	(considered lost)
Rolfe Photoplays	The Master Mystery	15	Mystery, Science fiction	Harry Grossman and Burton L. King	Harry Houdini	(Incomplete, reconstructed version available on DVD)
Burston Films Inc.	The Silent Mystery	15	Mystery	Francis Ford	Francis Ford, Mae Gaston, Rosemary Theby	(considered lost)
Universal Film Manufacturing Co.	The Red Glove	18	Western	J. P. McGowan	Marie Walcamp	(considered lost)
	The Lion's Claws	18	Adventure	Harry Harvey and Jacques Jaccard	Marie Walcamp	(considered lost)
	The Brass Bullet	18	Maritime	Ben F. Wilson	Juanita Hansen, Jack Mulhall	(considered lost)
	Lure of the Circus	18	Circus	J. P. McGowan	Eddie Polo	(Only an edited feature version exists)
	Bull's Eye	18	Western	James W. Horne	Eddie Polo	(considered lost)
Vitagraph Company of America	A Woman in the Web	15		Paul Hurst and David Smith	Hedda Nova	(considered lost)
	A Fight for Millions	15	Western	William Duncan	William Duncan, Edith Johnson, Joe Ryan	
	The Iron Test	15	Circus	Robert North Bradbury and Paul Hurst	Antonio Moreno, Carol Holloway	
Société des Etablissements L. Gaumont	Tih Minh	12	Mystery	Louis Feuillade	René Cresté, Mary Harald	French (A complete print exists)
1919
Astra Film Corporation/Pathé	The Lightning Raider	15	Crime	George B. Seitz	Pearl White, Boris Karloff	Survives in an incomplete state preserved at the Library of Congress
	Terror of the Range	7	Western	Stuart Paton	George Larkin, Betty Compson	(considered lost)
	The Tiger's Trail	15	Mystery	Robert Ellis, Louis J. Gasnier and Paul Hurst	Ruth Roland	
	Bound and Gagged	10	Comedy	George B. Seitz	George B. Seitz, Marguerite Courtot	Four episodes survive in the Library of Congress
	The Adventures of Ruth	15	Crime	George Marshall	Ruth Roland	(considered lost)
George B. Seitz Productions	The Black Secret	15	Spy	George B. Seitz	Pearl White	
Western Photoplays Inc.	The Great Gamble	15	Crime	Joseph A. Golden	Charles Hutchison, Anna Luther	
Oliver Films Inc.	The Carter Case	15	Mystery	William F. Haddock and Donald MacKenzie	Herbert Rawlinson, Marguerite Marsh	A Craig Kennedy mystery
Great Western Film Producing Company	Elmo the Mighty	18	Northern	Henry MacRae	Elmo Lincoln, Grace Cunard	
SLK Serial Corporation	The Fatal Fortune	15	Maritime	Donald MacKenzie and Frank Wunderlee	Helen Holmes	
National Film Corporation of America	Lightning Bryce	15	Western, Horror	Paul Hurst	Ann Little, Jack Hoxie	
Wisteria Productions	The Lurking Peril	15	Horror	George Morgan	George Larkin, Anna Luther	
Burston Films Inc.	The Mystery of 13	15	Mystery	Francis Ford	Francis Ford, Rosemary Theby	
American Lifeograph Company	The Perils of Thunder Mountain	15	Northern	Robert North Bradbury and W.J. Burman	Antonio Moreno, Carol Holloway	
Serico Producing Company Inc.	A Woman in Grey	15	Mystery	James Vincent	Arline Pretty, Henry G. Sell	
Universal Film Manufacturing Co.	The Midnight Man	18		James W. Horne	James J. Corbett	
	The Lion Man	18	Mystery	Albert Russell and Jack Wells	Kathleen O'Connor, Jack Perrin, J. Barney Sherry, Gertrude Astor	
	The Great Radium Mystery	18	Mystery	Robert Broadwell and Robert F. Hill	Eileen Sedgwick, Cleo Madison, Robert Reeves	
Shamrock Photoplay Corporation	The Masked Rider	15	Western	Aubrey M. Kennedy	Harry Myers, Ruth Stonehouse, Paul Panzer, Boris Karloff	
Hallmark Pictures Corporation	The Trail of the Octopus	15	Mystery	Duke Worne	Ben F. Wilson, Neva Gerber	
Vitagraph Company of America	Man of Might	15	Maritime	William Duncan and Clifford Smith	William Duncan	
	Smashing Barriers	15	Western	William Duncan	William Duncan	
Société des Etablissements L. Gaumont	Barrabas	12		Louis Feuillade		French

== 1920s ==
Production company	Title	Chapters	Genre	Director	Cast	Notes
1920
Allgood Pictures Corporation	The Whirlwind	15		Joseph A. Golden	Charles Hutchison	
Arrow Film Corporation	The Fatal Sign	14	Mystery	Stuart Paton	Claire Anderson, Harry Carter	
Berwilla Film Corporation	Thunderbolt Jack	10	Western	Francis Ford and Murdock MacQuarrie	Jack Hoxie, Marin Sais	
Burston Films Inc.	The Hawk's Trail	15	Crime	W. S. Van Dyke	King Baggot, Grace Darmond, Rhea Mitchell	
Canyon Pictures Corporation	Vanishing Trails	15	Western	Leon De La Mothe	Franklyn Farnum, Mary Anderson	
Fox Film Corporation	Bride 13	15	Maritime	Richard Stanton		
	Fantômas	20	Crime	Edward Sedgwick		Based on Fantômas by Marcel Allain and Pierre Souvestre
Frohman Amusement Corporation	The Invisible Ray	15	Science fiction	Harry A. Pollard	Ruth Clifford, Jack Sherrill	
George B. Seitz Productions	Velvet Fingers	15		George B. Seitz	George B. Seitz, Marguerite Courtot	
Great Western Film Producing Corporation	Elmo the Fearless	18		J. P. McGowan	Elmo Lincoln	
Grossman Pictures	The $1,000,000 Reward	15		Harry Grossman and George Lessey	Lillian Walker	
Hallmark Pictures Corporation	The Screaming Shadow	15	Horror	Ben F. Wilson and Duke Worne	Ben F. Wilson, Neva Gerber	
	The Evil Eye	15		J. Gordon Cooper and Wally Van	Benny Leonard	
Holmes Producing Corporation	The Tiger Band	15		Gilbert P. Hamilton	Helen Holmes	
National Film Corporation of America	The Son of Tarzan	15	Jungle; Fantasy	Arthur J. Flaven and Harry Revier	Kamuela C. Searle	Based on the Tarzan character created by novelist Edgar Rice Burroughs
Pathé & Astra Film Corporation	Daredevil Jack	15		W. S. Van Dyke	Jack Dempsey	
	Trailed by Three	15	Western	Perry N. Vekroff	Stuart Holmes, Frankie Mann	
	The Third Eye	15		James W. Horne	Warner Oland, Eileen Percy	
	Pirate Gold	10	Maritime	George B. Seitz	George B. Seitz, Marguerite Courtot	
	The Phantom Foe	15	Mystery	Bertram Millhauser	Juanita Hansen, Warner Oland	
Pathé & Ruth Roland Serials	Ruth of the Rockies	15	Western	George Marshall	Ruth Roland	
Select Pictures Corporation	The Branded Four	15		Duke Worne	Ben F. Wilson, Neva Gerber	
Supreme Pictures Corporation	The Mystery Mind	15		Will S. Davis and Fred Sittenham	J. Robert Pauline	
Torquay & Paignton Photoplay Productions	The Great London Mystery		Horror mystery	Charles Raymond	David Devant	British
Universal Pictures	The Moon Riders	18	Western	B. Reeves Eason and Theodore Wharton	Art Acord, Mildred Moore	
	The Vanishing Dagger	18		Edward A. Kull, J. P. McGowan and Eddie Polo	Eddie Polo	
	The Dragon's Net	12		Henry MacRae	Marie Walcamp, Harland Tucker	
	The Flaming Disc	18		Robert F. Hill	Elmo Lincoln, Louise Lorraine	
	King of the Circus	18		J. P. McGowan	Eddie Polo	
Vitagraph Company of America	The Invisible Hand	15	Western	William Bowman	Antonio Moreno	
	The Silent Avenger	15		William Duncan	William Duncan, Edith Johnson	
	Hidden Dangers	15		William Bertram	Joe Ryan, Jean Paige	
	The Veiled Mystery	15	Western	William Bowman, Webster Cullison, Francis J. Grandon and Antonio Moreno	Antonio Moreno	
Warner Bros.	The Lost City	15	Jungle	E.A. Martin	Juanita Hansen	
1921
Arrow Film Corporation	The Blue Fox	15	Northern	Duke Worne	Ann Little	An incomplete print of the film exists at the UCLA Film and Television Archive.
Burston Films Inc.	The Great Reward	15		Francis Ford	Francis Ford	
Films Diamant	Les Trois Mousquetaires			Henri Diamant-Berger	Aimé Simon-Girard, Henri Rollan	French; Based on The Three Musketeers by Alexandre Dumas
Ermolieff Films	La pocharde	12		Henri Étiévant		French; Based on a novel by Jules Mary
Société des Etablissements L. Gaumont	Les Deux Gamines	12		Louis Feuillade	Sandra Milovanoff	French
	Parisette			Louis Feuillade	Sandra Milovanoff, Georges Biscot	French
George B. Seitz Productions	The Sky Ranger	15		George B. Seitz	June Caprice, George B. Seitz	
	Hurricane Hutch	15		George B. Seitz	Charles Hutchison, Warner Oland	
Kosmik	The Hope Diamond Mystery	15		Stuart Paton	Grace Darmond, Boris Karloff	
Pathé	Double Adventure	15		W. S. Van Dyke	Charles Hutchison	
	The Avenging Arrow	15		William Bowman and W. S. Van Dyke	Ruth Roland	
Phocea Film	L'Essor			Charles Burguet	Suzanne Grandais, Maurice Escande	French
Photoplay Serial Company	Mysterious Pearl	15		Ben F. Wilson	Neva Gerber, Ben F. Wilson	
UFA GmbH	Peter Voss, Thief of Millions	6		Georg Jacoby	Harry Liedtke	German; Alternative title: The Man Without a Name; Based on Peter Voss, Thief of Millions by Ewald Gerhard Seeliger
Universal Pictures	The Diamond Queen	18		Edward A. Kull	Eileen Sedgwick	Based on the novel The Diamond Master by Jacques Futrelle
	Do or Die	18		J. P. McGowan	Eddie Polo	
	The White Horseman	18	Western	Albert Russell	Art Acord	
	Terror Trail	18	Western	Edward A. Kull	Eileen Sedgwick	
	Winners of the West	13	Western	Edward Laemmle	Art Acord	
	The Secret Four	15		Albert Russell and Perry N. Vekroff	Eddie Polo	
Vitagraph Company of America	Breaking Through	15		Robert Ensminger		
	Fighting Fate	15		William Duncan	William Duncan, Edith Johnson	
Warner Bros.	Miracles of the Jungle	15	Jungle/Adventure	James Conway and E.A. Martin		Lost film
Weiss Brothers Artclass Pictures Corporation	The Adventures of Tarzan	15	Jungle; Fantasy	Robert F. Hill and Scott Sidney	Elmo Lincoln, Louise Lorraine	Based on the Tarzan character created by novelist Edgar Rice Burroughs
1922
Arrow Film Corporation	Nan of the North	15	Northern	Duke Worne	Ann Little	
George B. Seitz Productions	Go Get 'Em Hutch	15		George B. Seitz	Charles Hutchison	
	Speed	15		George B. Seitz	Charles Hutchison, Lucy Fox	
Hal Roach Studios Inc. & Ruth Roland Serials	White Eagle	15	Western	Fred Jackman and W. S. Van Dyke	Ruth Roland	
	The Timber Queen	15		Fred Jackman	Ruth Roland	
Société des Cinéromans	Rouletabille chez les bohémiens	10		Henri Fescourt	Gabriel de Gravone	French; Based on Rouletabille by Gaston Leroux
Star Serial Corporation	Captain Kidd	15	Pirate	Burton L. King and J. P. McGowan	Eddie Polo	
Universal Pictures	With Stanley in Africa	18	Jungle	William James Craft and Edward A. Kull	George Walsh, Louise Lorraine	
	The Adventures of Robinson Crusoe	18	Maritime	Robert F. Hill	Harry Myers, Gertrude Olmstead, Noble Johnson	Based on Robinson Crusoe by Daniel Defoe; Lost film
	Perils of the Yukon	15	Northern	Jay Marchant, J. P. McGowan and Perry N. Vekroff	William Desmond	
	In the Days of Buffalo Bill	18	Western	Edward Laemmle	Art Acord	
	The Radio King	10		Robert F. Hill	Roy Stewart	
Vitagraph Company of America	The Purple Riders	15	Western	William Bertram	Joe Ryan	
Warner Bros.	A Dangerous Adventure	15	Jungle	Jack L. Warner and Sam Warner	Grace Darmond	Lost film
William N. Selig Productions	The Jungle Goddess	15	Jungle	James Conway	Elinor Field, Truman Van Dyke	
1923
Arrow Film Corporation	The Fighting Skipper	15	Maritime	Francis Ford	Jack Perrin, Peggy O'Day	
	The Santa Fe Trail	15	Western	Ashton Dearholt and Robert Dillon	Neva Gerber, Jack Perrin	
Ermolieff Films	The House of Mystery	10		Alexandre Volkoff	Ivan Mosjoukine, Charles Vanel	French; Based on a novel by Jules Mary
George B. Seitz Productions	Plunder	15		George B. Seitz	Pearl White	
Hal Roach Studios Inc.	Haunted Valley	15		George Marshall	Ruth Roland	
	Her Dangerous Path	10		Roy Clements	Edna Murphy	
Ruth Roland Serials	Ruth of the Range	15		Ernest C. Ward, Frank Leon Smith and W. S. Van Dyke	Ruth Roland	
Universal Pictures	Around the World in Eighteen Days	12		Robert F. Hill and B. Reeves Eason	William Desmond	
	Beasts of Paradise	15		William James Craft	William Desmond, Eileen Sedgwick	
	The Eagle's Talons	15		Duke Worne	Fred Thomson, Ann Little	
	The Ghost City	15	Western	Jay Marchant	Pete Morrison, Margaret Morris, Al Wilson	
	In the Days of Daniel Boone	15	Western	William James Craft	Jack Mower, Eileen Sedgwick	
	The Oregon Trail	18	Western	Edward Laemmle	Art Acord, Louise Lorraine	
	The Phantom Fortune	12		Robert F. Hill	William Desmond	
	The Social Buccaneer	10		Robert F. Hill	Jack Mulhall	Based on a novel by Frederic S. Isham
	The Steel Trail	15		William Duncan	William Duncan, Edith Johnson	
1924
Arrow Film Corporation	Riders of the Plains	15	Western	Jacques Jaccard	Jack Perrin, Boris Karloff	
Pathé	The Fortieth Door	10	Adventure	George B. Seitz	Allene Ray	
	Galloping Hoofs	10	Western	George B. Seitz	Allene Ray	
	Into the Net	10		George B. Seitz	Edna Murphy, Jack Mulhall	
	Leatherstocking	10	Western	George B. Seitz	Edna Murphy, Harold Miller	Based on The Deerslayer by James Fenimore Cooper
	Ten Scars Make a Man	10		William Parke	Allene Ray	
	The Way of a Man	10	Western	George B. Seitz	Allene Ray, Harold Miller	Screenplay by Emerson Hough
Rayart Pictures Corporation	Battling Brewster	15	Western/ Boxing	Dell Henderson	Franklyn Farnum, Helen Holmes	
Universal Pictures	The Fast Express	15		William Duncan	William Duncan, Edith Johnson	
	The Fighting Ranger	18	Western	Jay Marchant	Jack Dougherty, Al Wilson, Eileen Sedgwick	
	The Iron Man	15	Crime drama	Jay Marchant	Luciano Albertini, Margaret Morris, Joe Bonomo, Jack Dougherty	
	The Riddle Rider	15	Western	William James Craft	William Desmond, Eileen Sedgwick	Considered a lost film; followed by a 1927 sequel Return of the Riddle Rider
	Wolves of the North	10	Northern	William Duncan	William Duncan, Edith Johnson	
1925
Adventure Pictures	Perils of the Wild	15	Maritime	Francis Ford	Joe Bonomo, Boris Karloff	Based on The Swiss Family Robinson by Johann David Wyss
J. Charles Davis Productions	The Mystery Box	10		Alan James	Ben F. Wilson, Neva Gerber	
	The Power God	15	Science fiction	Francis Ford and Ben F. Wilson	Ben F. Wilson, Neva Gerber	
Pathé	The Green Archer	10	Mystery	Spencer Gordon Bennet	Allene Ray, Walter Miller	Based on a novel by Edgar Wallace
	The House Without a Key	10	Mystery	Spencer Gordon Bennet	Allene Ray, Walter Miller	First onscreen appearance of "Charlie Chan"; based on The House Without a Key by Earl Derr Biggers
	Idaho	10	Western	Robert F. Hill	Mahlon Hamilton, Vivian Rich	
	Sunken Silver	10		Spencer Gordon Bennet	Allene Ray, Walter Miller	Based on a novel by Albert Payson Terhune
	Wild West	10	Western	Robert F. Hill	Helen Ferguson, Jack Mulhall	
	Play Ball	10		Spencer Gordon Bennet	Allene Ray, Walter Miller	
Rayart Pictures Corporation	The Flame Fighter	10		Robert Dillon	Herbert Rawlinson	
	Secret Service Sanders	15		Duke Worne	Ashton Dearholt, Ann Little	
Société des Cinéromans	Surcouf	8	Maritime	Luitz-Morat	Jean Angelo	French
Universal Pictures	Ace of Spades	15	Western	Henry MacRae	William Desmond	
	The Great Circus Mystery	15		Jay Marchant	Joe Bonomo, Louise Lorraine	
Wild West Productions	Days of '49	15	Western	Jacques Jaccard and Ben F. Wilson	Neva Gerber, Edmund Cobb	
1926
Goodwill Pictures	Officer 444	10		Francis Ford and Ben F. Wilson	Ben F. Wilson, Neva Gerber	
	The Radio Detective	10		William James Craft and William A. Crinley	Jack Dougherty, Margaret Quimby	
Holmes Producing Corporation	Lightning Hutch	10		Charles Hutchison	Charles Hutchison	
	The Mystery Pilot	10				
Pathé	The Bar-C Mystery	10	Western	Robert F. Hill	Dorothy Phillips, Wallace MacDonald	
	Casey of the Coast Guard	10	Maritime	William Nigh	George O'Hara, Helen Ferguson	
	The Fighting Marine	10		Spencer Gordon Bennet	Gene Tunney	
	Snowed In	10		Spencer Gordon Bennet	Allene Ray, Walter Miller	
Rayart Pictures Corporation	The Phantom Police	10		Robert Dillon	Herbert Rawlinson	
	Scotty of the Scouts	10	Boy scouts	Duke Worne	Ben Alexander	
	Trooper 77	10		Duke Worne	Herbert Rawlinson	
Sierra Pictures	Vanishing Millions	15		Alan James		
Universal Pictures	The Scarlet Streak	10		Henry MacRae	Jack Dougherty, Lola Todd	
	Fighting With Buffalo Bill	10	Western	Ray Taylor	Wallace MacDonald	
	Strings of Steel	10		Henry MacRae	William Desmond, Eileen Sedgwick	
	The Winking Idol	10	Western	Francis Ford	William Desmond, Eileen Sedgwick	
	The Silent Flyer	10	Northern	William James Craft	Silver Streak the dog, Louise Lorraine	This serial led to the founding of Mascot Pictures and is often listed as Mascot's first serial; it was produced by Nat Levine but released by Universal.
1927
Hercules Film Productions	King of the Jungle	10	Jungle	Webster Cullison	Elmo Lincoln, Sally Long, Gordon Standing	considered a lost film (only a trailer exists)
Mascot Pictures	Heroes of the Wild	10	Western	Harry S. Webb	Jack Hoxie, Joe Bonomo, Tornado the Wonder Dog, White Fury (the horse)	First Mascot serial; considered a lost film
	Isle of Sunken Gold	10	Maritime, Pirates	Harry S. Webb	Anita Stewart, Duke Kahanamoku, Jack Pierce (make-up artist)	Parts of chapters 4 through 7 were recently discovered
	The Golden Stallion	10	Western	Harry S. Webb	Lefty Flynn, Joe Bonomo, White Fury	A complete print exists
William Steiner Prods.	The Scarlet Brand	10	Western	Neal Hart	Neal Hart, Lucille Irwin, Wm. Quinn	
Pathé	The Crimson Flash	10	Action	Arch Heath	Cullen Landis, Eugenia Gilbert, J. Barney Sherry	Considered a lost film
	Hawk of the Hills	10	Western	Spencer Gordon Bennet	Allene Ray, Walter Miller, Jack Ganzhorn	A complete print exists
	The Masked Menace	10	Crime film	Arch Heath	Larry Kent, Jean Arthur, Thomas Holding	Based on a short story "Still Face" by Clarence Budington Kelland; a lost film
	Melting Millions	10	Crime film	Spencer Gordon Bennet	Allene Ray, Walter Miller, Eugenia Gilbert	considered a lost film
	On Guard!	10		Arch Heath	Cullen Landis, Muriel Kingston, Walter P. Lewis	considered a lost film
Rayart Pictures Corporation	Fighting For Fame	10		Duke Worne	Ben Alexander	
Société des Cinéromans	Belphégor			Henri Desfontaines		French; Based on Belphégor by Arthur Bernède
Universal Pictures	Blake of Scotland Yard	12	Crime	Robert F. Hill	Hayden Stevenson, Grace Cunard, Monte Montague, Walter Brennan	Followed by a sequel The Ace of Scotland Yard (1929)
	The Fire Fighters	10	Crime film	Jacques Jaccard	Jack Dougherty, Helen Ferguson, Lafe McKee	Considered a lost film
	The Return of the Riddle Rider	10	Western	Robert F. Hill	William Desmond, Grace Cunard, Lola Todd	A sequel to The Riddle Rider (1924); Considered a lost film
	The Trail of the Tiger	10	Crime film	Henry MacRae	Jack Dougherty, Francis Teague, Jack Mower	Considered a lost film
	Whispering Smith Rides	10	Western	Ray Taylor	Wallace MacDonald	Based on Whispering Smith by Frank H. Spearman; a lost film
Weiss Brothers Artclass Pictures Corporation	Perils of the Jungle	10	Jungle	Ray Taylor and Jack Nelson	Eugenia Gilbert, Frank Merrill, Bobby Nelson	
William I. Pizor Productions	The Mansion of Mystery	10	Mystery	Robert J. Horner		
1928
Goodart	Pirates of the Pines	10	Maritime	J.C. Cook	George O'Hara	
Mascot Pictures	The Vanishing West	10	Western	Richard Thorpe	Eileen Sedgwick, Jack Perrin, Jack Dougherty	
	Vultures of the Sea	10	Maritime	Richard Thorpe	Boris Karloff	
William M. Pizor	The House of Terror	10	Horror	Roland D. Reed	Pat O'Brien, Jack La Rue	
Pathé	Eagle of the Night	10	Aviation	James F. Fulton		
	The Man Without a Face	10		Spencer Gordon Bennet	Allene Ray, Walter Miller	Written by A. M. Williamson and C. N. Williamson
	Mark of the Frog	10		Arch Heath		Written by Edgar Wallace (considered lost)
	The Terrible People	10		Spencer Gordon Bennet	Allene Ray, Walter Miller	Based on The Terrible People by Edgar Wallace
	The Tiger's Shadow	10		Spencer Gordon Bennet	Gladys McConnell, Hugh Allan	
	The Yellow Cameo	10		Spencer Gordon Bennet	Allene Ray, Cyclone the Dog	
Robert J. Horner	The Mystery Rider	10	Western	Robert J. Horner	William Desmond	
Syndicate Pictures	The Chinatown Mystery	10		J. P. McGowan	Joe Bonomo, Ruth Hiatt, Francis Ford	
Universal Pictures	A Final Reckoning	12	Western	Ray Taylor	Newton House, Louise Lorraine	
	Haunted Island	10	Fantasy	Robert F. Hill	Jack Dougherty	Remake of the 1918 Universal serial The Brass Bullet
	The Scarlet Arrow	10	Northern	Ray Taylor	Francis X. Bushman Jr.	
	Tarzan the Mighty	15	Jungle; Fantasy	Ray Taylor and Jack Nelson	Frank Merrill, Natalie Kingston	Based on the novel Jungle Tales of Tarzan by Edgar Rice Burroughs; considered a lost film
	The Vanishing Rider	12	Western	Ray Taylor	William Desmond, Ethlyne Clair, Boris Karloff	considered lost.
Weiss Brothers Artclass Pictures Corporation	The Mysterious Airman	10	Aviation	Harry Revier	Walter Miller, Eugenia Gilbert	Written by famed mystery novelist Arthur B. Reeve
Weiss Brothers Artclass Pictures Corporation	Police Reporter	10		Jack Nelson	Walter Miller, Eugenia Gilbe	
1929
Mascot Pictures	The Fatal Warning	10	Mystery	Richard Thorpe	Helene Costello, Ralph Graves, Boris Karloff	(considered lost)
	The King of the Kongo	10	Jungle	Richard Thorpe	Jacqueline Logan, Walter Miller, Boris Karloff	First serial with partial sound; a complete picture exists, but some of the sound has been lost.
Pathé	The Black Book	10	Crime	Spencer Gordon Bennet	Allene Ray, Walter Miller	Print exists in the Library of Congress film archive [episodes 1, 3, 5-10, 35mm positive].
	The Fire Detective	10	Crime	Spencer Gordon Bennet	Gladys McConnell, Hugh Allan	(considered lost)
	Queen of the Northwoods	10	Northern	Spencer Gordon Bennet	Walter Miller, Ethlyne Clair	Incomplete print believed to exist
Universal Pictures	The Diamond Master	10	Crime	Jack Nelson	Hayden Stevenson, Louise Lorraine	Based on a novel by Jacques Futrelle (considered lost)
	The Pirate of Panama	12	Maritime	Ray Taylor	Natalie Kingston, Buffalo Bill Jr.	(considered lost)
	The Ace of Scotland Yard	10	Mystery	Ray Taylor	Crawford Kent, Monte Montague	First Partial Sound Universal serial; released in both silent and sound versions; considered a lost film
	Tarzan the Tiger	15	Jungle; Fantasy	Henry MacRae	Frank Merrill, Natalie Kingston	Based on the novel "Tarzan and the Jewels of Opar" by Edgar Rice Burroughs; two versions were released: one silent, the other with music & sound fx added; available on DVD

== 1930s ==
(Film prints exist unless noted otherwise)

Production company	Title	Chapters	Genre	Director	Cast	Notes
1930
Ben Wilson Productions	The Voice from the Sky	10	Science fiction	Ben F. Wilson	Wally Wales, Neva Gerber	First serial with full sound; a print is believed to exist
Mascot Pictures	The Lone Defender	12	Western, Animal adventure	Richard Thorpe	Rin Tin Tin, Buzz Barton, Joe Bonomo, June Marlowe	Print exists; also released as a feature version
Talking Picture Epics Inc.	Across the World with Mr & Mrs Martin Johnson		Travelogue	James Leo Meehan	Martin and Osa Johnson	Tour visits Australia, Hawaii, Tanganyika and the Belgian Congo
	Hunting Tigers in India	82 minutes	Documentary	James Leo Meehan	George Miller Dyott	Filmed in 1929; later re-edited into a 3-episode series
Universal Pictures	The Jade Box	10	Fantasy; Mystery	Ray Taylor	Jack Perrin, Louise Lorraine, Francis Ford, Jay Novello	Partial sound; an incomplete print exists in Universal's vault
	The Lightning Express	10	Western, Railroad	Henry MacRae	Louise Lorraine, Lane Chandler, Al Ferguson, James Pierce	Based on the "Whispering Smith" character created by novelist Frank H. Spearman; Remake of Whispering Smith Rides (1927); considered a lost film
	Terry of the Times	10	Crime	Henry MacRae	Reed Howes, Lotus Thompson, Sheldon Lewis,	Universal's last partial sound serial; considered a lost film
	The Indians are Coming	12	Western	Henry MacRae	Tim McCoy, Allene Ray, Francis Ford	First Universal all-talking serial; based on a novel The Great West That Was by "Buffalo Bill" Cody
1931
Les Films Osso	Méphisto	4	Mystery	Henri Debain and Georges Vinter	Jean Gabin	French; Based on a novel by Arthur Bernède
Mascot Pictures	The Phantom of the West	10	Western	D. Ross Lederman	Tom Tyler, Dorothy Gulliver, Yakima Canutt, William Desmond, Joe Bonomo, Kermit Maynard	
	King of the Wild	12	Jungle	Richard Thorpe, B. Reeves Eason	Walter Miller, Nora Lane, Boris Karloff, Albert DeWinton, Mischa Auer	Also released in South America as a feature film version called "Bimi"
	The Vanishing Legion	12	Western, Animal adventure	Ford Beebe and B. Reaves Eason	Harry Carey, Edwina Booth, Rex King of the Wild Horses, Boris Karloff (voice only), Frankie Darro, Yakima Canutt, Joe Bonomo	
	The Galloping Ghost	12	Sports	B. Reaves Eason and Benjamin H. Kline	Football star Harold "Red" Grange, Dorothy Gulliver, Lon Chaney Jr. (uncredited), Yakima Canutt, Stepin Fetchit	
	The Lightning Warrior	12	Western, Animal adventure	Benjamin H. Kline and Armand Schaefer	Rin Tin Tin (as Rinty), Frankie Darro, George Brent, Lafe McKee	This was Rin Tin Tin's last role, being replaced in 1932 by Rin Tin Tin Jr.
Metropolitan Pictures	The Sign of the Wolf	10	Western, Animal adventure	Forrest Sheldon and Harry S. Webb	Rex Lease, Virginia Brown Faire, Joe Bonomo, Edmund Cobb, Muro the Wonder Dog	
Syndicate Pictures	The Mystery Trooper	10	Western, Northern	Stuart Paton and Harry S. Webb	Robert Frazer, Buzz Barton, Al Ferguson, Chief White Cloud	Re-released in 1935 as "Trail of the Royal Mounted" with chapter titles all renamed
Universal Studios	Finger Prints	10	Crime	Ray Taylor	Kenneth Harlan, Edna Murphy, Monte Montague	a lost film
	Heroes of the Flames	12	Crime/ Firefighters	Robert F. Hill	Tim McCoy, Andy Devine, Joe Bonomo, Walter Brennan, Monte Montague	Print was rediscovered and preserved by Universal, but is not available on DVD
	Danger Island	12	Jungle	Ray Taylor	Kenneth Harlan, Lucile Browne, Walter Miller, Andy Devine	a lost film
	Battling with Buffalo Bill	12	Western	Ray Taylor	Tom Tyler, Lucile Browne, Jim Thorpe, Yakima Canutt, William Desmond, Joe Bonomo	Based on a novel The Great West That Was by "Buffalo Bill" Cody
	The Spell of the Circus	12	Crime	Robert F. Hill	Francis X. Bushman Jr., Alberta Vaughn, Monte Montague	considered a lost film
1932
Mascot Pictures	The Shadow of the Eagle	12	Crime, Aviation	Ford Beebe	John Wayne (his first serial), Dorothy Gulliver, Monte Montaguem, Little Billy Rhodes	Edited into a feature film version when released years later on video
	The Last of the Mohicans	12	Western	Ford Beebe and B. Reeves Eason	Harry Carey, Hobart Bosworth, Edwina Booth, Yakima Canutt	Based on the novel by James Fenimore Cooper
	The Hurricane Express	12	Railroad	J. P. McGowan and Armand Schaefer	John Wayne, Shirley Grey, Glenn Strange, Tully Marshall, Fred Snowflake Toones	Later released as a feature film version as well
	The Devil Horse	12	Western, Animal adventure	Otto Brower	Harry Carey, Noah Beery, Apache (King of the Wild Horses), Frankie Darro, Lane Chandler	
RKO Radio Pictures	The Last Frontier	12	Western	Spencer Gordon Bennet, Thomas L. Storey	Lon Chaney Jr. (as The Black Ghost), Francis X. Bushman Jr., William Desmond (as George Custer), Yakima Canutt (as Wild Bill Hickok), Dorothy Gulliver	Based on a novel by Courtney Ryley Cooper; also released theatrically in 1932 as a 70-minute feature film version called The Black Ghost.
Universal Pictures	Detective Lloyd	12	Crime	Ray Taylor and Henry MacRae	Jack Lloyd, Muriel Angelus, Wallace Geoffrey	US/British co-production with British cast, released theatrically in Europe as Lloyd of the C.I.D.; a.k.a. The Green Spot Mystery (feature version); considered a lost film today
	The Airmail Mystery	12	Aviation	Ray Taylor	James Flavin, Lucile Browne, Al Wilson, Walter Brennan, Wheeler Oakman	Wilson was killed during the filming of this serial; considered a lost film
	Heroes of the West	12	Western	Ray Taylor	Noah Beery Jr., Onslow Stevens, Julie Bishop, Francis Ford	based on the novel "The Tie That Binds" by Peter B. Kyne; the novel was made into another serial in 1938 called Flaming Frontiers
	Jungle Mystery	12	Jungle	Ray Taylor	Tom Tyler, Noah Beery Jr., Cecilia Parker, William Desmond, Onslow Stevens, Ralph Morgan, Sam Baker as the Ape Man	based on a novel "The Ivory Trail" by Talbot Mundy; Also released as a feature version; A complete print exists but only in Universal's vault
	The Lost Special	12	Railroad	Henry MacRae	Frank Albertson, Cecilia Parker, Francis Ford, Joe Bonomo, Edmund Cobb	Based on the story The Lost Special by Arthur Conan Doyle
1933
Mascot Pictures	The Whispering Shadow	12	Mystery	Colbert Clark and Albert Herman	Bela Lugosi (his first sound serial), Viva Tattersall, Henry B. Walthall, Roy D'Arcy	Also exists as a feature version
	The Three Musketeers	12	Foreign Legion	Colbert Clark and Armand Schaefer	John Wayne, Jack Mulhall, Ruth Hall, Lon Chaney Jr., Raymond Hatton, Robert Frazer, Francis X. Bushman	Chaney's appearance is mainly in the first chapter; Edited later into a 1946 feature version called Desert Command
	Fighting with Kit Carson	12	Western	Colbert Clark and Armand Schaefer	Johnny Mack Brown, Noah Beery Sr., Noah Beery Jr., Lane Chandler, Tully Marshall	Released theatrically as a feature film version in 1946
	The Wolf Dog	12	Western, Animal Adventure	Colbert Clark and Harry L. Fraser	Rin Tin Tin Jr., Frankie Darro, George Lewis, Boots Mallory, Hale Hamilton	Rin Tin Tin Jr.'s first serial film, having replaced the original dog star in 1932
	The Mystery Squadron	12	Aviation	Colbert Clark and David Howard	Bob Steele, Lucile Browne, J. Carrol Naish, Guinn "Big Boy" Williams, Robert Frazer	
Principal Pictures	Tarzan the Fearless	12	Jungle; Fantasy	Robert F. Hill	Buster Crabbe, Jacqueline Wells (aka Julie Bishop), E. Alyn Warren, Mischa Auer	Based on the Tarzan novels by Edgar Rice Burroughs; only the edited feature version still exists
Universal Studios	Clancy of the Mounted	12	Northern	Ray Taylor	Tom Tyler, Jacqueline Wells, William Desmond, Francis Ford, Iron Eyes Cody, Frank Lackteen	(Only the first 6 chapters are available on DVD, but the British Film Institute (BFI) holds a complete 35mm print of all 12 chapters)
	The Phantom of the Air	12	Aviation	Ray Taylor	Tom Tyler, William Desmond, Walter Brennan, LeRoy Mason, Gloria Shea	
	Gordon of Ghost City	12	Western	Ray Taylor	Buck Jones, Madge Bellamy, William Desmond, Edmund Cobb, Francis Ford	Based on the novel "Oh Promise Me!" by Peter B. Kyne
	The Perils of Pauline	12	Damsel in distress, Action	Ray Taylor	Evalyn Knapp, William Desmond, Robert Allen, Frank Lackteen	Sound remake of the 1914 eponymous serial
1934
Mascot Pictures	The Lost Jungle	12	Jungle	David Howard and Armand Schaefer	Clyde Beatty, Syd Saylor, Gabby Hayes	Followed by a sequel Darkest Africa in 1936
	Burn 'Em Up Barnes	12	Sports (auto racing)	Colbert Clark and Armand Schaefer	Frankie Darro, Jack Mulhall, Lola Lane, Jason Robards	Loose remake of the 1921 silent film of the same name
	The Law of the Wild	12	Western, Animal adventure	B. Reeves Eason and Armand Schaefer	Rin Tin Tin Jr., Rex the Wonder Horse, Bob Custer, Ben Turpin, Richard Alexander, Slim Whitaker	
	Mystery Mountain	12	Western, Animal adventure	Otto Brower and B. Reeves Eason	Ken Maynard, Syd Saylor, Tarzan the Wonder Horse, Gene Autry, Yakima Canutt	
Principal Pictures	The Return of Chandu	12	Fantasy	Ray Taylor	Bela Lugosi, Maria Alba, Clara Kimball Young	Based on the popular Chandu the Magician radio program; later released as two separate feature versions
Romance Productions Incorporated	Young Eagles	12	Boy Scouts, Jungle	Edward Laurier, Vin Moore, Spencer Gordon Bennett	Bobby Cox, Jim Vance, IronEyes Cody, Frank Lackteen, Carter Dixon	Boy Scouts hunt treasure in Central America; A nitrate print survives in the UCLA Film and Television Archives
Universal Pictures	Pirate Treasure	12	Maritime	Ray Taylor	Richard Talmadge, Lucille Lund, Walter Miller, William Desmond	
	The Vanishing Shadow	12	Science fiction	Lew Landers	Onslow Stevens, William Desmond, Monte Montague, Ada Ince	Lee J. Cobb's first film appearance
	The Red Rider	15	Western, Animal adventure	Lew Landers	Buck Jones, Grant Withers, William Desmond, Jim Thorpe, Silver the Horse	Based on the short story "The Redhead from Sun Dog" by W. C. Tuttle; a remake of Buck Jones' earlier 1931 film The Range Feud
	Tailspin Tommy	12	Aviation	Lew Landers	Maurice Murphy, Noah Beery Jr., Grant Withers, Walter Miller, William Desmond	Based on the "Tailspin Tommy" newspaper comic strip by Hal Forrest
1935
Burroughs-Tarzan Enterprises	The New Adventures of Tarzan	12	Jungle; Animal adventure	Edward A. Kull	Herman Brix as Tarzan, Ula Holt, Ashton Dearholt, Jiggs the Chimp	Based on the Tarzan character created by Edgar Rice Burroughs; also released as a feature film version
Mascot Pictures	The Phantom Empire	12	Western, Fantasy	Otto Brower and B. Reeves Eason	Gene Autry, Frankie Darro, Smiley Burnette, Wheeler Oakman, Betsy King Ross	Considered the first Science-Fiction Western
	The Miracle Rider	15	Western	Otto Brower and B. Reeves Eason	Tom Mix (his last major role), Charles Middleton, Robert Frazer, Jason Robards	Characters include Buffalo Bill, Davey Crockett and Daniel Boone
	The Adventures of Rex and Rinty	12	Crime, Animal adventure	B. Reeves Eason and Ford Beebe	Kane Richmond, Smiley Burnette, Rin Tin Tin Jr., Rex the Wonder Horse	
	The Fighting Marines	12	War	B. Reeves Eason and Joseph Kane	Grant Withers, Adrian Morris, Richard Alexander, Jason Robards Sr.	Last Mascot serial; Mascot merged into Republic Pictures
Screen Attractions	Queen of the Jungle	12	Jungle	Robert F. Hill	Mary Kornman, Reed Howes	Used extensive stock footage from Jungle Goddess (1922)
Super Serial Productions Inc.	The Lost City	12	Science Fiction, Jungle	Harry Revier	Wm. (stage) Boyd, Kane Richmond, Claudia Dell, Gabby Hayes	later edited into four different feature versions
Universal Pictures	Rustlers of Red Dog	12	Western	Lew Landers	Johnny Mack Brown, Raymond Hatton, Chief Thundercloud	Based on the book The Great West That Was by William "Buffalo Bill" Cody
	The Call of the Savage	12	Jungle; Fantasy	Lew Landers	Noah Beery Jr.	Based on a story "Jan of the Jungle" by Otis Adelbert Kline; later edited into a 70-minute feature version called Savage Fury
	The Roaring West	15	Western	Ray Taylor	Buck Jones, Frank McGlynn Sr., William Desmond	
	Tailspin Tommy in the Great Air Mystery	12	Aviation	Ray Taylor	Clark Williams, Jean Rogers, Noah Beery Jr., Grant Withers	Based on the "Tailspin Tommy" comic strip by Hal Forrest
1936; Beginning of the Golden Age of Serials
Republic Pictures	Darkest Africa	15	Jungle	B. Reeves Eason and Joseph Kane	Clyde Beatty, Manuel King, Elaine Shepard, Lucien Prival	First Republic serial; sequel to "The Lost Jungle" (1934); later reissued as King of the Jungleland
	Undersea Kingdom	12	Fantasy	B. Reeves Eason and Joseph Kane	Ray (Crash) Corrigan, Lois Wilde, Smiley Burnette	Later released as a 100-minute feature version entitled Sharad of Atlantis
	The Vigilantes Are Coming	12	Western	Ray Taylor and Mack V. Wright	Robert Livingston, Ray Corrigan, Guinn "Big Boy" Williams, Raymond Hatton	Later re-edited into six 26-minute episodes for television
	Robinson Crusoe of Clipper Island	14	Maritime, Animal adventure	Ray Taylor and Mack V. Wright	Mala, Rex the Wonder Horse, Mamo Clark	released in 1966 as a feature version called Robinson Crusoe of Mystery Island
Stage & Screen Productions (Weiss Bros.)	Custer's Last Stand	15	Western	Elmer Clifton	Rex Lease, Frank McGlynn Jr., Chief Thundercloud	features characters General Custer, Calamity Jane and Wild Bill Hickok
Stage & Screen Productions (Weiss Bros.)	The Clutching Hand	15	Mystery	Albert Herman	Jack Mulhall, Mae Busch, Rex Lease, Richard Alexander	A Craig Kennedy mystery; also released as a 70-minute feature version
Stage & Screen Productions (Weiss Bros.)	The Black Coin	15	Mystery	Albert Herman	Ralph Graves, Ruth Mix, Dave O'Brien, Yakima Canutt	
Universal Pictures	The Adventures of Frank Merriwell	12	Sports	Ford Beebe and Clifford Smith	Donald Briggs, Jean Rogers, Carla Laemmle	Based on the Frank Merriwell novels by Gilbert Patten
	Flash Gordon	13	Science fiction	Frederick Stephani	Buster Crabbe, Jean Rogers, Frank Shannon, Charles Middleton, Glenn Strange (as "the Gocko")	Based on the comic strip by Alex Raymond; later re-released as two different feature versions, "Rocket Ship" (72 min.) and "Spaceship to the Unknown" (90 min.)
	The Phantom Rider	15	Western	Ray Taylor	Buck Jones, Charles King	
	Ace Drummond	13	Aviation	Ford Beebe and Clifford Smith	John King, Jean Rogers, Noah Beery Jr., Lon Chaney Jr.	Based on a comic strip by Eddie Rickenbacker
Victory Pictures (Sam Katzman)	Shadow of Chinatown	15	Mystery, Yellow peril	Robert F. Hill	Bela Lugosi, Herman Brix	Also exists as a feature version
1937
Columbia Pictures	Jungle Menace	15	Jungle	Harry L. Fraser and George Melford	Frank Buck; Charlotte Henry	First Columbia serial (produced by Weiss Bros.); later released as a 70-minute feature version called "Jungle Terror".
	The Mysterious Pilot	15	Aviation	Spencer Gordon Bennet	Frank Hawks	Produced by Weiss Brothers; based on a novel "The Silver Hawk" by William Byron Mowery
Republic Pictures	Dick Tracy	15	Crime	Alan James, Ray Taylor	Ralph Byrd, Smiley Burnette, Kay Hughes	Based on the famous comic strip by Chester Gould
	The Painted Stallion	12	Western	Alan James, William Witney, Ray Taylor	Ray Corrigan, Hoot Gibson, Duncan Renaldo, Yakima Canutt	Featured characters Kit Carson, Jim Bowie and Davy Crockett; later re-edited into a six-episode TV series, as well as a 72-minute feature version
	S.O.S. Coast Guard	12	Maritime, Science fiction	Alan James, William Witney	Ralph Byrd, Bela Lugosi, Richard Alexander	Also exists as a 71-minute feature version including some newly added footage
	Zorro Rides Again	12	Western	William Witney, John English	John Carroll, Noah Beery, Duncan Renaldo, Richard Alexander	Based on the Zorro character created by novelist Johnston McCulley; later released as a six-episode TV series, as well as a 68-minute eponymous feature version.
Universal Pictures	Jungle Jim	12	Jungle	Ford Beebe and Clifford Smith	Grant Withers, Henry Brandon, Raymond Hatton	Based on the popular comic strip by Alex Raymond
	Secret Agent X-9	12	Crime	Ford Beebe and Clifford Smith	Scott Kolk, Jean Rogers, Henry Brandon, Lon Chaney Jr.	Based on the comic strip by Dashiell Hammett and Alex Raymond
	Wild West Days	13	Western	Ford Beebe and Clifford Smith	Johnny Mack Brown, Chief Thundercloud	Based on the novel "Saint Johnson" by William R. Burnett
	Radio Patrol	12	Crime	Ford Beebe and Clifford Smith	Grant Withers, Robert Armstrong	Based on the popular comic strip by Eddie Sullivan and Charles Schmidt
	Tim Tyler's Luck	12	Jungle	Ford Beebe and Wyndham Gittens	Frankie Thomas, William Benedict	Based on the popular comic strip created by Lyman Young
Victory Pictures (Sam Katzman)	Blake of Scotland Yard	15	Crime	Robert F. Hill	Ralph Byrd, Joan Barclay, Dickie Jones	Last independent American serial; also released as a 73-minute feature version
1938
Columbia Pictures	The Secret of Treasure Island	15	Jungle	Elmer Clifton	Don Terry, Gwen Gaze, Walter Miller, Grant Withers	Last serial produced by Weiss Bros.; based on a serialized story "Murder at Pirate Castle" (1936) by L. Ron Hubbard; Bela Lugosi was originally slated to co-star
	The Great Adventures of Wild Bill Hickok	15	Western	Mack V. Wright and Sam Nelson	William Elliott, Frankie Darro, Dickie Jones, Ray Mala, Chief Thundercloud, Kenne Duncan	
	The Spider's Web	15	Superhero	Ray Taylor and James W. Horne	Warren Hull, Kenne Duncan, Iris Meredith, Nestor Paiva, Byron Foulger	Based on a popular 1930s pulp magazine; followed by a sequel The Spider Returns (1941)
Republic Pictures	The Lone Ranger	15	Western	William Witney and John English	Lee Powell, Chief Thundercloud, Herman Brix, Lane Chandler	Based on the popular 1930s radio program; later released as a 69-minute feature version called Hi-Yo Silver
	The Fighting Devil Dogs	12	Science fiction	William Witney and John English	Lee Powell, Herman Brix	Later re-edited into a 69-minute feature version for TV, retitled Torpedo of Doom
	Dick Tracy Returns	15	Crime	William Witney and John English	Ralph Byrd, Charles Middleton, David Sharpe	Based on the famous comic strip by Chester Gould; re-released theatrically in July 1948
	Hawk of the Wilderness	12	Jungle	William Witney and John English	Herman Brix, Mala, Monte Blue, Noble Johnson	based on the novel by William L. Chester later re-edited and released to TV as The Lost Island of Kioga
Universal Studios	Flash Gordon's Trip to Mars	15	Science fiction	Frederick Stephani	Buster Crabbe, Jean Rogers, Charles Middleton, Frank Shannon, Richard alexander, Kenne Duncan	Based on the comic strip by Alex Raymond; later retitled Space Soldiers' Trip to Mars for TV release
	Flaming Frontiers	15	Western	Alan James and Ray Taylor	Johnny Mack Brown, Charles Middleton, Chief Thundercloud	based on "The Tie That Binds" (a novel) by Peter B. Kyne; later re-edited for TV release in 1966
	Red Barry	13	Crime	Alan James	Buster Crabbe, Wheeler Oakman, Philip Ahn	Based on the comic strip by Will Gould
1939
Columbia Pictures	Flying G-Men	15	Aviation	Ray Taylor and James W. Horne	Robert Paige, Richard Fiske, James Craig, Lorna Gray	
	Mandrake the Magician	12	Fantasy	Sam Nelson and Norman Deming	Warren Hull, Al Kikume	Based on the popular comic strip created by Lee Falk
	Overland with Kit Carson	15	Western	Sam Nelson and Norman Deming	Bill Elliott, Richard Fiske, Iris Meredith, Kenne Duncan	
Republic Pictures	The Lone Ranger Rides Again	15	Western	William Witney and John English	Robert Livingston, Chief Thundercloud, Glenn Strange, Duncan Renaldo	Based on the popular 1930s "Lone Ranger" radio program
	Daredevils of the Red Circle	12	Adventure	William Witney and John English	Charles Quigley, Herman Brix, David Sharpe, Carole Landis, Charles Middleton	Later re-edited into six 26-minute episodes for television
	Dick Tracy's G-Men	15	Crime	William Witney and John English	Ralph Byrd, Irving Pichel, Ted Pearson, Phylis Isley	Based on the famous comic strip by Chester Gould; re-released theatrically in Sept., 1955
	Zorro's Fighting Legion	12	Western	William Witney and John English	Reed Hadley	Based on the Zorro character created by novelist Johnston McCulley; later re-edited into six 26-minute episodes for TV
Universal Pictures	Scouts to the Rescue	12	Boy scouts	Alan James and Ray Taylor	Jackie Cooper, Jason Robards Sr., Bill Cody Jr.	
	Buck Rogers	12	Science fiction	Ford Beebe and Saul A. Goodkind	Buster Crabbe, Henry Brandon, Philson Ahn, Anthony Warde, Constance Moore, Jackie Moran, Kenne Duncan	Based on the popular comic strip by Philip Francis Nowlan; later re-edited into 2 separate feature versions, Destination Saturn and Planet Outlaws
	The Oregon Trail	15	Western	Ford Beebe and Saul A. Goodkind	Johnny Mack Brown, Fuzzy Knight, Roy Barcroft	
	The Phantom Creeps	12	Science fiction	Ford Beebe and Saul A. Goodkind	Bela Lugosi, Edward Van Sloan, Regis Toomey, Ed Wolff (as the Robot)	Also exists as a 78-minute feature version; contains stock footage from The Invisible Ray (1936)

== 1940s ==
Production company	Title	Chapters	Genre	Director	Cast	Notes
1940
Columbia Pictures	The Shadow	15	Crime/ Superhero	James W. Horne	Victor Jory, Robert Fiske, Veda Ann Borg	Based on the radio program and pulp magazine series
	Terry and the Pirates	15	Jungle	James W. Horne	William Tracy, Granville Owen, Sheila Darcy, Dick Curtis	Based on the "Terry and the Pirates" newspaper comic strip created by Milton Caniff
	Deadwood Dick	15	Western	James W. Horne	Don Douglas; Lane Chandler; Lorna Gray; Kenne Duncan	Character loosely based on "Zorro"
	The Green Archer	15	Mystery	James W. Horne	Victor Jory, Iris Meredith, James Craven, Kenne Duncan	Based on the 1923 novel by Edgar Wallace
Republic Pictures	Drums of Fu Manchu	15	Yellow Peril; Mystery	William Witney and John English	Henry Brandon, Olaf Hytton, William Royle, Dwight Frye	Based on the character created by Sax Rohmer; also released as a 69-minute feature version with an altered ending
	Adventures of Red Ryder	12	Western	William Witney and John English	Don "Red" Barry, Noah Beery Sr., Tommy Cook, Maude Pierce Allen	Based on the western comic strip by Fred Harmon
	King of the Royal Mounted	12	Northern	William Witney and John English	Allan Lane, Robert Strange, Herbert Rawlinson	Based on the comic strip written by Zane Grey; also released as a 68-minute feature version called The Yukon Patrol
	Mysterious Doctor Satan	15	Superhero	William Witney and John English	Eduardo Ciannelli, Robert Wilcox, C. Montague Shaw, Tom Steele (as the Robot)	Features a hero called "The Copperhead"; originally written as a never-produced Republic "Superman" serial; later re-edited into a seven episode TV series, as well as a 100-minute feature version called Doctor Satan's Robot
Universal Pictures	The Green Hornet	13	Crime/Superhero	Ray Taylor and Ford Beebe	Gordon Jones, Keye Luke, Anne Nagel	Based on the popular radio program by George W. Trendle and Fran Striker; some home video versions are heavily edited
	Flash Gordon Conquers the Universe	12	Science fiction/Superhero	Ray Taylor and Ford Beebe	Buster Crabbe, Carol Hughes, Charles Middleton, Frank Shannon, Ray Mala	Based on the famous comic strip by Alex Raymond; later released as three separate re-edited feature versions, entitled "Purple Death from Outer Space", "Perils from the Planet Mongo" and "Space Soldiers Conquer the Universe".
	Winners of the West	13	Western	Ray Taylor and Ford Beebe	Dick Foran, Anne Nagel, Roy Barcroft	Not to be confused with the 1921 silent serial of the same name
	Junior G-Men	12	Crime	John Rawlins and Ford Beebe	Dead End Kids, Little Tough Guys, David Sharpe	
1941
Columbia Pictures	White Eagle	15	Western	James W. Horne	Buck Jones, Raymond Hatton, Dorothy Fay, Kenne Duncan	Remake of a 1932 Buck Jones western film also called "White Eagle"
	The Spider Returns	15	Crime/ Superhero	James W. Horne	Warren Hull, Kenne Duncan, Mary Ainslee	Based on the 1930s pulp magazine character "The Spider"; this was a sequel to The Spider's Web (1938); an 80-minute feature version exists that was only shown in England
	The Iron Claw	15	Mystery	James W. Horne	Charles Quigley, Joyce Bryant, Alex Callam	
	Holt of the Secret Service	15	Crime	James W. Horne	Jack Holt, Evelyn Brent, Tristram Coffin	
Republic Pictures	Adventures of Captain Marvel	12	Superhero	William Witney and John English	Tom Tyler, William Benedict, Louise Currie, Kenne Duncan	Based on the popular Captain Marvel comic book series; later reissued to theaters in 1953 as Return of Captain Marvel
	Jungle Girl	15	Jungle	William Witney and John English	Frances Gifford, Tom Neal, Gerald Mohr, Emil Van Horn (as the Gorilla)	Based on the 1932 novel "Jungle Girl" by Edgar Rice Burroughs; re-released to theaters in 1947; followed by a sequel The Perils of Nyoka (1942)
	King of the Texas Rangers	12	Western	William Witney and John English	Slingin' Sammy Baugh, Neil Hamilton, Duncan Renaldo, Kenne Duncan	Later re-edited into six 26-minute episodes for television
	Dick Tracy vs. Crime, Inc.	15	Crime	William Witney and John English	Ralph Byrd, Ralph Morgan, John Davidson, Jan Wiley	Based on the famous comic strip by Chester Gould; later re-released theatrically in 1952 as Dick Tracy vs. Phantom Empire; featured stock footage from Deluge (1933)
Universal Pictures	The Green Hornet Strikes Again!	15	Crime/Superhero	John Rawlins and Ford Beebe	Warren Hull, Keye Luke, Anne Nagel	Based on the Green Hornet radio program by George W. Trendle and Fran Striker
	Sky Raiders	12	Aviation	Ray Taylor and Ford Beebe	Donald Woods, Billy Halop, Robert Armstrong, Eduardo Ciannelli	
	Riders of Death Valley	15	Western	Ray Taylor and Ford Beebe	Buck Jones, Dick Foran, Leo Carrillo, Lon Chaney Jr., Glenn Strange, Roy Barcroft, Richard Alexander	
	Sea Raiders	12	Maritime	Ray Taylor and Ford Beebe	The Dead End Kids and the Little Tough Guys, Richard Alexander	
1942
Columbia Pictures	Captain Midnight	15	Superhero	James W. Horne	Dave O'Brien, James Craven	Based on the "Captain Midnight" radio adventure serial broadcast from 1938 to 1949
	Perils of the Royal Mounted	15	Western	James W. Horne	Robert Kellard, Kenneth MacDonald, Iron Eyes Cody, Kermit Maynard	
	The Secret Code	15	Spy	Spencer Gordon Bennet	Paul Kelly, Anne Nagel, Frank Shannon, Kenne Duncan	Features a hero called "The Black Commando"
	The Valley of Vanishing Men	15	Western	Spencer Gordon Bennet	Bill Elliott, Slim Summerville, Kenne Duncan	
Republic Pictures	Spy Smasher	12	War Superhero	William Witney	Kane Richmond, Tristram Coffin, Marguerite Chapman	Based on the Fawcett Comics "Spy Smasher" character; later released to TV as a 100-minute feature version Spy Smasher Returns
	Perils of Nyoka	15	Jungle	William Witney	Kay Aldridge, Clayton Moore, Lorna Gray, Charles Middleton, Tristram Coffin, William Benedict, Kenne Duncan	Based on the 1932 Edgar Rice Burroughs novel "Jungle Girl"; later re-released to theatres in 1952 as "Nyoka and the Tiger Men"; later released to TV as a 100-minute feature version called "Nyoka and the Lost Secrets of Hippocrates"
	King of the Mounties	12	Northern	William Witney	Allan Lane, Peggy Drake	Originally intended to be the 2nd Spy Smasher serial; recently restored by SerialSquadron.com, completing Chapter Three.
Universal Pictures	Don Winslow of the Navy	12	Maritime	Ray Taylor and Ford Beebe	Don Terry, Anne Nagel	Based on the popular comic strip by Commander Frank V. Martinek
	Gang Busters	13	Crime	Ray Taylor and Noel M. Smith	Kent Taylor. Irene Hervey, Ralph Morgan, Robert Armstrong	Based on the popular "Gang Busters" radio program; re-released theatrically in 1949
	Junior G-Men of the Air	12	Aviation	Ray Taylor, Lewis D. Collins	The Dead End Kids, Turhan Bey, William Benedict, Lionel Atwill, Frankie Darro	
	Overland Mail	15	Western	John Rawlins and Ford Beebe	Lon Chaney Jr., Noah Beery Sr., Noah Beery Jr., Don Terry, Bob Baker	Based on the short story by Johnston McCulley; later released as a feature version called "The Indian Raiders"
1943
Columbia Pictures	Batman	15	Superhero	Lambert Hillyer	Lewis Wilson, Douglas Croft, J. Carrol Naish, Charles Middleton, Kenne Duncan	Based on the popular comic book series from DC Comics; reissued theatrically in 1965
	The Phantom	15	Jungle/ Superhero	B. Reeves Eason	Tom Tyler, Jeanne Bates, frank Shannon	Based on Lee Falk's popular newspaper comic strip; followed by a 1955 sequel The Adventures of Capt. Africa
Republic Pictures	G-Men vs The Black Dragon	15	Spy	Spencer Gordon Bennet	Rod Cameron, Roland Got, George J. Lewis	Later released as a 100-minute feature version called Black Dragon of Manzanar; followed by a 1943 sequel called Secret Service in Darkest Africa
	Daredevils of the West	12	Western	John English	Allan Lane, Kay Aldridge, Chief Thundercloud, Jay Silverheels, Kenne Duncan	Film was incomplete for years, but was restored and released on DVD in 2011
	Secret Service in Darkest Africa	15	Spy	Spencer Gordon Bennet	Rod Cameron, Duncan Renaldo, Joan Marsh	Later re-released theatrically in 1954 as Manhunt in the African Jungles; later released as a feature version called The Baron's African War
	The Masked Marvel	12	Superhero	Spencer Gordon Bennet	Tom Steele, Louis Currie, Tom Steele, Johnny Arthur	Later released as a 100-minute feature version called Sakima and the Masked Marvel
Universal Pictures	The Adventures of Smilin' Jack	13	Aviation	Ray Taylor, Lewis D. Collins	Tom Brown, Keye Luke, Sidney Toler, Turhan Bey, Jay Novello	Based on the popular newspaper comic strip by Zack Mosley
	Don Winslow of the Coast Guard	13	War	Ray Taylor and Lewis D. Collins	Don Terry, Philip Ahn, Nestor Paiva, Walter Sande	Based on the popular newspaper comic strip "Don Winslow of the Navy" by Frank V. Martinbek
	Adventures of the Flying Cadets	13	Aviation	Ray Taylor and Lewis D. Collins	Johnny Downs, Bobby Jordan, Robert Armstrong, William Benedict, Robert Armstrong, Billy Halop, Eduardo Ciannelli, Ian Keith	
1944
Columbia Pictures	The Desert Hawk	15	Adventure	B. Reeves Eason	Gilbert Roland, Charles Middleton, Chief Thundercloud, Elmo Lincoln	
	Black Arrow	15	Western	B. Reeves Eason and Lew Landers	Robert Scott, Charles Middleton, Elmo Lincoln	
Republic Pictures	Captain America	15	Superhero	Elmer Clifton and John English	Dick Purcell, Lionel Atwill, Edward Van Sloan, Lorna Gray, Kenne Duncan	Based on the popular comic book series by Marvel Comics; the chapters were re-released theatrically in 1953 as The Return of Captain America
	The Tiger Woman	12	Jungle	Spencer Gordon Bennet	Linda Stirling, Allan Lane, Duncan Renaldo, George J. Lewis, Kenne Duncan	Re-released theatrically in 1951 as Perils of the Darkest Jungle; released in 1966 as a feature version called Jungle Gold
	Haunted Harbor	15	Maritime	Spencer Gordon Bennet	Kane Richmond, Roy Barcroft, Kay Aldridge, Kenne Duncan	Based on the novel by Ewart Adamson (aka Dayle Douglas); re-released theatrically in 1951 as Pirates' Harbor
	Zorro's Black Whip	12	Western	Spencer Gordon Bennet	Linda Stirling, Francis McDonald, George J. Lewis	Based on the Zorro character created by Johnston McCulley, but due to legalities, the character was called "The Black Whip" (not Zorro) in this serial; re-released theatrically in 1957
Universal Pictures	The Great Alaskan Mystery	13	Mystery	Ray Taylor and Lewis D. Collins	Milburn Stone, Martin Kosleck, Ralph Morgan, Edgar Kennedy, Fuzzy Knight	
	Raiders of Ghost City	13	Western	Ray Taylor and Lewis D. Collins	Dennis Moore, Lionel Atwill, Wanda McKay, Virginia Christine	
	Mystery of the River Boat	13	Western	Ray Taylor and Lewis D. Collins	Robert Lowery, Mantan Moreland, Lyle Talbot	
1945; End of the Golden Age of Serials
Columbia Pictures	Brenda Starr, Reporter	13	Crime	Wallace Fox	Joan Woodbury, Kane Richmond, Syd Saylor, Wheeler Oakman	Based on the popular comic strip created by Dale Messick
	The Monster and the Ape	15	Science fiction	Howard Bretherton	Robert Lowery, Ralph Morgan, Willie Best, Ray Corrigan (as the Ape)	
	Jungle Raiders	15	Jungle	Lesley Selander	Kane Richmond, Carol Hughes, Charles King, Veda Ann Borg	
	Who's Guilty?	15	Mystery	Howard Bretherton and Wallace Grissell	Robert Kent, Amelita Ward, Charles Middleton, Minerva Urecal	
Republic Pictures	Manhunt of Mystery Island	15	Jungle/ science fiction	Spencer Gordon Bennet	Linda Stirling, Richard Bailey, Roy Barcroft, Kenne Duncan	Re-released theatrically in 1956; later released as a 100-minute feature version called Captain Mephisto and the Transformation Machine
	Federal Operator 99	12	Crime	Spencer Gordon Bennet	Marten Lamont, Helen Talbot, Lorna Gray, George J. Lewis	Re-released theatrically in 1956; later reissued as a feature version called F.B.I. 99
	The Purple Monster Strikes	15	Science fiction	Spencer Gordon Bennet and Fred C. Brannon	Linda Stirling, Dennis Moore, Roy Barcroft, James Craven, Kenne Duncan	Re-released theatrically in 1957; later released as a 100-minute feature version called D-Day on Mars
Universal Pictures	Jungle Queen	13	Jungle	Ray Taylor and Lewis D. Collins	Ruth Roman, Edward Norris, Douglas Dumbrille, Clarence Muse	Later re-edited into a feature version called Jungle Safari in 1956
	The Master Key	13	Crime	Ray Taylor and Lewis D. Collins	Milburn Stone, Lash Larue, Dennis Moore, Byron Foulger	
	Secret Agent X-9	13	Spy	Ray Taylor and Lewis D. Collins	Lloyd Bridges, Keye Luke, Samuel S. Hinds	Based on the comic strip created by Dashiell Hammett and Alex Raymond
	The Royal Mounted Rides Again	13	Northern	Ray Taylor and Lewis D. Collins	Bill Kennedy, George Dolenz, Milburn Stone, Robert Armstrong	
1946
Columbia Pictures	Hop Harrigan	15	Aviation	Derwin Abrahams	William Bakewell, Wheeler Oakman, Jennifer Holt	Based on the "Hop Harrigan" comic book published by DC Comics
	Chick Carter, Detective	15	Crime	Derwin Abrahams	Lyle Talbot, George Meeker, Charles King, Pamela Blake	Based on the popular radio program "Chick Carter, Boy Detective"
	Son of the Guardsman	15	Medieval adventure	Derwin Abrahams	Bob Shaw, Robert "Buzz" Henry, Jock Mahoney	Based on the Robin Hood legend (but Robin Hood is not a character in the film)
Republic Pictures	The Phantom Rider	12	Western	Spencer Gordon Bennet and Fred C. Brannon	Robert Kent, Peggy Stewart, Kenne Duncan, Roy Barcroft, Chief Thundercloud	later re-released theatrically in 1954 as "Ghost Riders of the West"
	King of the Forest Rangers	12	Northern	Spencer Gordon Bennet and Fred C. Brannon	Larry Thompson, Helen Talbot, Anthony Warde	Later re-edited into six 26-minute episodes for television
	Daughter of Don Q	12	Crime	Spencer Gordon Bennet and Fred C. Brannon	Lorna Gray, Kirk Alyn, LeRoy Mason, Roy Barcroft	Features a female "Zorro" character called Dolores Quantero
	The Crimson Ghost	12	Science fiction	William Witney and Fred C. Brannon	Charles Quigley, Linda Stirling, Clayton Moore, Kenne Duncan, I. Stanford Jolley	Also released to TV in the 1950s as a six-episode TV program; later released as a 100-minute feature version called Cyclotrode X; one of the few serials ever to be colorized on home video
Universal Pictures	The Scarlet Horseman	13	Western	Ray Taylor and Lewis D. Collins	Paul Guilfoyle, Virginia Christine, Kenne Duncan	
	Lost City of the Jungle	13	Jungle	Ray Taylor and Lewis D. Collins	Russell Hayden, Jane Adams, Lionel Atwill, Keye Luke	(Atwill died during filming)
	The Mysterious Mr. M	13	Science fiction	Lewis D. Collins and Vernon Keays	Richard Martin, Pamela Blake, Dennis Moore	Last Universal serial
1947
Columbia Pictures	Jack Armstrong	15	Science fiction	Wallace Fox	John Hart, Rosemary LaPlanche, Pierre Watkin, Wheeler Oakman, Charles Middleton	Based on the popular radio program "Jack Armstrong, the All-American Boy"
	The Vigilante	15	Western/ Superhero	Wallace Fox	Ralph Byrd, Ramsay Ames, Lyle Talbot	Based on the DC Comics character, The Vigilante (character)
	The Sea Hound	15	Maritime	Walter B. Eason and Mack V. Wright	Buster Crabbe, Jimmy Lloyd, Pamela Blake	Based on the 1940s radio program The Sea Hound featuring the seafaring character Capt. Silver
	Brick Bradford	15	Science fiction	Spencer Gordon Bennet	Kane Richmond, Rick Vallin, Carol Forman, John Merton, John Hart	Based on the Brick Bradford newspaper comic strip created by Clarence Gray
Republic Pictures	Son of Zorro	13	Western	Spencer Gordon Bennet and Fred C. Brannon	George Turner, Peggy Stewart, Roy Barcroft	Based on the Zorro character created by novelist Johnston McCulley; later re-edited into six 26-minute episodes for television
	Jesse James Rides Again	13	Western	Fred C. Brannon	Clayton Moore. Linda Stirling	First of Republic's three "Jesse James" serials; re-released theatrically in March 1955
	The Black Widow	13	Spy	Spencer Gordon Bennet and Fred C. Brannon	Bruce Edwards, Carol Forman, Ramsay Ames, Anthony Warde, I. Stanford Jolley	Also re-edited into six 26-minute episodes for TV; later released as a 100-minute feature version called "Sombra, the Spider Woman"
1948
Columbia Pictures	Tex Granger	15	Western	Derwin Abrahams	Robert Kellard, Peggy Stewart, Robert "Buzz" Henry, I. Stanford Jolley	Based on a character in "Calling All Boys" (a comic book) and a novel called The Last Frontier by Courtney Ryley Cooper
	Superman	15	Superhero	Spencer Gordon Bennet	Kirk Alyn, Noel Neill, Pierre Watkin, Tommy Bond, Carol Forman, Herbert Rawlinson	Based on the famous DC Comics comic book character; followed by a 1950 sequel Atom Man Vs. Superman
	Congo Bill	15	Jungle	Spencer Gordon Bennet, Thomas Carr	Don McGuire, Cleo Moore, Jack Ingram	Based on the famous DC Comics comic book character
Republic Pictures	G-Men Never Forget	12	Crime	Fred C. Brannon	Clayton Moore, Roy Barcroft, Ramsay Ames	Later released as a 100-minute feature version entitled Code 645
	Dangers of the Canadian Mounted	12	Northern	Fred C. Brannon	Jim Bannon, Anthony Warde, Virginia Belmont	Re-released theatrically in 1965; also released as a 100-minute feature version called R.C.M.P. and the Treasure of Genghis Khan
	Adventures of Frank and Jesse James	13	Western	Fred C. Brannon, Yakima Canutt	Clayton Moore, Noel Neill, George J. Lewis, Steve Darrell	Re-released theatrically in 1956
1949
Columbia Pictures	Bruce Gentry	15	Aviation, Science fiction	Spencer Gordon Bennet, Thomas Carr	Tom Neal, Tristram Coffin, Forrest Taylor	Based on the "Bruce Gentry" newspaper comic strip created by Ray Bailey
	Batman and Robin	15	Superhero	Spencer Gordon Bennet	Robert Lowery, Johnny Duncan, Jane Adams, Lyle Talbot	Based on the famous DC Comics comic book characters; re-released theatrically in 1965
	Adventures of Sir Galahad	15	Fantasy	Spencer Gordon Bennet	George Reeves, Nelson Leigh, William Fawcett, Hugh Prosser	Based on the King Arthur legend
Republic Pictures	Federal Agents vs. Underworld, Inc	12	Crime	Fred C. Brannon	Kirk Alyn, Rosemary Planche, Roy Barcroft, Carol Forman, Tristram Coffin	Later released as a 100-minute feature version called "The Golden Hands of Kurigal"
	Ghost of Zorro	12	Western	Fred C. Brannon	Clayton Moore, Roy Barcroft, George J. Lewis,	Based on the Zorro character created by novelist Johnston McCulley; later released as a 69-minute feature version as well
	King of the Rocket Men	12	Science fiction	Fred C. Brannon	Tristram Coffin, Mae Clarke, James Craven, I. Stanford Jolley	Inspired by the Buck Rogers serial character; re-released theatrically in 1956; released as a 65-minute feature version called Lost Planet Airman
	The James Brothers of Missouri	12	Western	Fred C. Brannon	Noel Neill, Keith Richards, Robert Bice, Roy Barcroft	
	Radar Patrol vs Spy King	12	Spy	Fred C. Brannon	Kirk Alyn, John Merton, Tristram Coffin, George J. Lewis	

== 1950s ==
Production company	Title	Chapters	Genre	Director	Cast	Notes
1950
Columbia Pictures	Cody of the Pony Express	15	Western	Spencer Gordon Bennet	Jock Mahoney, Dickie Moore, Peggy Stewart, George J. Lewis	Based loosely on the life of Buffalo Bill Cody
Columbia Pictures	Atom Man vs. Superman	15	Superhero	Spencer Gordon Bennet	Kirk Alyn, Noel Neill, Lyle Talbot, Tommy Bond	Based on the Superman comic book character published by DC Comics
Columbia Pictures	Pirates of the High Seas	15	Maritime/ Jungle	Spencer Gordon Bennet, Thomas Carr	Buster Crabbe, Lois Hall, Tristram Coffin	
Great Britain Instructional	The Mystery of the Snakeskin Belt	8	Jungle adventure	Frank Cadman	Colin Barlow, Ursula Strachey, Cyril Wentzel	British; Last independent serial; filmed in Zimbabwe
Republic Pictures	The Invisible Monster	12	Science fiction	Fred C. Brannon	Richard Webb, Aline Towne, Lane Bradford, Stanley Price	Later released as a 100-minute feature version called Slaves of the Invisible Monster
Republic Pictures	Desperadoes of the West	12	Western	Fred C. Brannon	Richard Powers, Roy Barcroft, I. Stanford Jolley	
Republic Pictures	Flying Disc Man from Mars	12	Science fiction	Fred C. Brannon	Walter Reed, Lois Collier, Harry Lauter, James Craven	Reuses the villain's costume from The Purple Monster Strikes (1945); later released as a 75-minute feature version called Missile Monsters
1951
Columbia Pictures	Roar of the Iron Horse	15	Western	Spencer Gordon Bennet, Thomas Carr	Jock Mahoney, Virginia Herrick, Myron Healy	
Columbia Pictures	Mysterious Island	15	Science fiction, Fantasy	Spencer Gordon Bennet	Richard Crane, Marshall Reed, Karen Randle, Tom Tyler (uncredited)	Based on The Mysterious Island by Jules Verne
Columbia Pictures	Captain Video: Master of the Stratosphere	15	Science fiction	Spencer Gordon Bennet, Wallace Grissell	Judd Holdren, Larry Stewart, Gene Roth, Skelton Knaggs	Only serial adapted from a television program; reissued theatrically in 1958, 1960, and 1963
Republic Pictures	Don Daredevil Rides Again	12	Western	Fred C. Brannon	Ken Curtis, Roy Barcroft, Aline Townes, I. Stanford Jolley	Similar in theme to Zorro; includes stock footage from Zorro's Black Whip (1944)
Republic Pictures	Government Agents vs. Phantom Legion	12	Spy	Fred C. Brannon	Walter Reed (actor), Mary Ellen Kay, Dick Curtis	
1952
Columbia Pictures	King of the Congo	15	Jungle; Fantasy	Spencer Gordon Bennet, Wallace Grissell	Buster Crabbe, Gloria Dea, Rick Vallin, Leonard Penn	Based on the 1950s Thun'da comic book series drawn by Frank Frazetta
Columbia Pictures	Blackhawk	15	Aviation	Spencer Gordon Bennet, Fred F. Sears	Kirk Alyn, Carol Forman, Rick Vallin, John Crawford	Based on the Blackhawk DC Comics comic book series
Columbia Pictures	Son of Geronimo	15	Western	Spencer Gordon Bennet	Clayton Moore, Marshall Red, Rick Vallin, Rodd Redwing, Lyle Talbot	
Republic Pictures	Radar Men from the Moon	12	Science fiction	Fred C. Brannon	George D. Wallace, Aline Towne, Roy Barcroft, Clayton Moore	1st appearance of "Commando Cody"; later released as a 100-minute feature version called Retik, the Moon Menace (some videos were also released under the title Commando Cody vs. the Moon Menace)
Republic Pictures	Zombies of the Stratosphere	12	Science fiction	Fred C. Brannon	Judd Holdren, Leonard Nimoy, Aline Towne, Lane Bradford, John Crawford	Commando Cody is called "Larry Martin" in this sequel to Radar Men From the Moon; later released as a 70-minute B&W feature version called Satan's Satellites; also available colorized on VHS Home Video at 93 minutes
1953
Columbia Pictures	The Lost Planet	15	Science fiction	Spencer Gordon Bennet	Judd Holdren, Vivian Mason, Ted Thorpe, Gene Roth	Semi-sequel to the 1951 Captain Video serial
Columbia Pictures	The Great Adventures of Captain Kidd	15	Maritime	Derwin Abrahams and Charles S. Gould	Richard Crane, David Bruce, George Wallace, John Crawford, Marshall Reed	Loosely based on the life story of Captain William Kidd
Republic Pictures	Jungle Drums of Africa	12	Jungle	Fred C. Brannon	Phyllis Coates, Clayton Moore, Johnny Spencer	Later released as a feature version called U-238 and the Witch Doctor
Republic Pictures	Commando Cody: Sky Marshal of the Universe	12	Science fiction	Franklin Adreon, Fred C. Brannon, Harry Keller	Judd Holdren, Richard Crane, Aline Towne, William Schallert, Lyle Talbot	Released first theatrically in 1953 as a 12-episode serial (each episode was self-contained), then later released to television in 1955 as a 12-episode television series
Republic Pictures	Canadian Mounties vs. Atomic Invaders	12	Mountie spy	Franklin Adreon	Bill Henry, Susan Morrow, Arthur Space,	Later released as a 100-minute feature version called Missile Base at Taniak
1954
Columbia Pictures	Gunfighters of the Northwest	15	Northern	Spencer Gordon Bennet, Charles S. Gould	Clayton Moore, Jock Mahoney, Phyllis Coates, Lyle Talbot, Marshall Reed, Rodd Redwing	
Columbia Pictures	Riding with Buffalo Bill	15	Western	Spencer Gordon Bennet	Marshall Reed, Rick Vallin, Shirley Whitney	Includes stock footage from Deadwood Dick (1940)
Republic Pictures	Trader Tom of the China Seas	12	Maritime	Franklin Adreon	Phyllis Coates, Harry Lauter, Robert Shayne, Aline Towne, Lyle Talbot	Later released as a 100-minute feature version called Target: Sea of China
Republic Pictures	Man with the Steel Whip	12	Western	Franklin Adreon	Richard Simmons, Barbara Bestar, Roy Barcroft, Dale Van Sickel	Features a character called El Latigo, very similar to Zorro; used stock footage from all of the earlier Republic "Zorro" serials
1955
Columbia Pictures	The Adventures of Captain Africa	15	Jungle	Spencer Gordon Bennet	John Hart, Rick Vallin, Ben Weldon	Intended as a sequel to The Phantom; includes stock footage from The Phantom, Jungle Menace, and The Desert Hawk
Republic Pictures	Panther Girl of the Kongo	12	Jungle	Franklin Adreon	Phyllis Coates, Myron Healy, Arthur Space, David Sharpe (stunt double)	Later released as a 100-minute feature version called The Claw Monsters; includes stock footage from Jungle Girl (serial) and Perils of Nyoka
Republic Pictures	King of the Carnival	12	Crime	Franklin Adreon	Harry Lauter, Robert Shayne, Rick Vallin, Robert Clarke	Last Republic serial. Includes stock footage from Daredevils of the Red Circle
1956
Columbia Pictures	Perils of the Wilderness	15	Northern	Spencer Gordon Bennet	Dennis Moore, Richard Emory, Kenneth MacDonald, Rick Vallin	Includes stock footage from Perils of the Royal Mounted
Columbia Pictures	Blazing the Overland Trail	15	Western	Spencer Gordon Bennet	Dennis Moore, Lee Roberts, Kermit Maynard, Norma Brooks	Last Columbia serial; last major-studio serial; Includes stock footage from White Eagle (1941).
1957
Shintoho	Super Giant	9	Superhero	Teruo Ishii	Ken Utsui, Shōji Nakayama	Japanese tokusatsu film serial; later released to U.S. television as four separate Starman features.

== See also ==
- Serial (film)
- List of film serials by studio
