= Lloyd Whitlock =

American actor

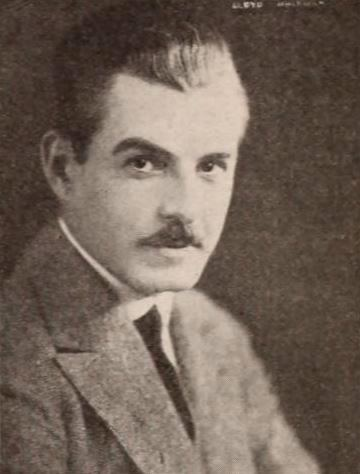
- Whitlock in 1920
- Born: Lloyd Theodore Whitlock; January 2, 1891; Springfield, Missouri, US
- Died: January 8, 1966 (aged 75); Los Angeles, California, US
- Years active: 1916–1949
- Spouse: Mary Gibsone

Lloyd Whitlock (January 2, 1891 – January 8, 1966) was a prolific American actor who began working during Hollywood's silent era. Born in 1891, he appeared in nearly 200 films between 1916 and 1949. Distinguished by his height and stature, he became especially known for playing heavies in B-movie westerns.

== Biography ==
Lloyd was born in Springfield, Missouri, to James Whitlock and Mary Wadlow. After appearing in dozens of silent films, Lloyd successfully made the transition to the talkies, appearing on-screen through the early 1940s. He married Mary Gibsone, a Canadian citizen, in Los Angeles in 1919. The pair had a daughter together. Lloyd died in 1966 in Los Angeles.

== Partial filmography ==
- The Man Who Took a Chance (1917)
- The Edge of the Law (1917)
- The Mysterious Mr. Tiller (1917)
- The Boomerang (1919)
- The Gray Wolf's Ghost (1919)
- Lasca (1919)
- Scratch My Back (1920)
- White and Unmarried (1921)
- The Face of the World (1921)
- False Kisses (1921)
- See My Lawyer (1921)
- One Man in a Million (1921)
- Courage (1921)
- They Shall Pay (1921)
- Not Guilty (1921)
- Wild Honey (1922)
- Kissed (1922)
- The Girl Who Ran Wild (1922)
- The Snowshoe Trail (1922)
- The Flirt (1922)
- The Woman of Bronze (1923)
- An Old Sweetheart of Mine (1923)
- Slippy McGee (1923)
- The Man Who Won (1923)
- The Thrill Chaser (1923)
- The Foolish Virgin (1924)
- The Price She Paid (1924)
- Women First (1924)
- Unmarried Wives (1924)
- The Triflers (1924)
- Who Cares (1925)
- The Air Mail (1925)
- The Great Sensation (1925)
- The New Champion (1925)
- The Prairie Pirate (1925)
- Speed Mad (1925)
- Perils of the Rail (1925)
- Dollar Down (1925)
- Sparrows (1926)
- The Fighting Buckaroo (1926)
- The Man in the Saddle (1926)
- Paradise (1926)
- The War Horse (1927)
- The Notorious Lady (1927)
- Pretty Clothes (1927)
- On the Stroke of Twelve (1927)
- A Hero for a Night (1927)
- Hot Heels (1928)
- The Man from Headquarters (1928)
- Queen of the Chorus (1928)
- The Michigan Kid (1928)
- The Fatal Warning (1929)
- See America Thirst (1930)
- Honeymoon Lane (1931)
- Wicked (1931)
- Anybody's Blonde (1931)
- Ships of Hate (1931)
- Scareheads (1931)
- The Shadow of the Eagle (1932)
- Sin's Pay Day (1932)
- The Widow in Scarlet (1932)
- The Hurricane Express (1932)
- Blonde Venus (1932)
- The Whispering Shadow (1933)
- Revenge at Monte Carlo (1933)
- Her Splendid Folly (1933)
- West of the Divide (1934)
- The Lucky Texan (1934)
- Behind the Green Lights (1935)
- Robinson Crusoe of Clipper Island (1936)
- Undersea Kingdom (1936)
- Night Cargo (1936)
- Counsel for Crime (1937)
- Nobody's Children (1940)
- White Eagle (1941)
