= The Iron Man (serial) =

1924 film serial

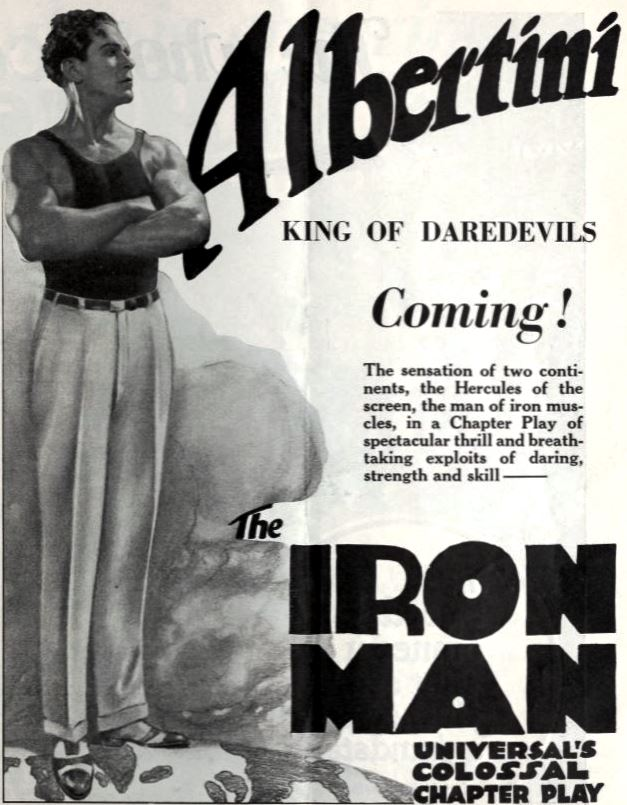
- Advertisement
- Directed by: Jay Marchant
- Written by: Arthur Henry Gooden; William E. Wing
- Starring: Luciano Albertini; Margaret Morris; Joe Bonomo
- Distributed by: Universal Pictures
- Release date: June 16, 1924
- Running time: 15 episodes
- Country: United States
- Language: Silent (English intertitles)

The Iron Man is a 1924 American film serial directed by Jay Marchant and starring Luciano Albertini and Joe Bonomo.

== Plot ==
In 1920s Paris, a newspaper reporter named Pual Beern is assigned to locate the missing niece of a wealthy American movie studio magnate.

== Cast ==
- Luciano Albertini as Paul Breen
- Margaret Morris as Arlene Graham
- Joe Bonomo as Gaston La Rue
- Jack Dougherty as Dick Clifford (credited as Jack Daugherty)
- Lola Todd as Mimi
- Jean De Briac as Jules Despaed
- William Welsh
- Rose Dione
- Harry Mann
- William T. Horne (credited as W.T. Horne)
- Jack Pratt

== Chapter titles ==
1. Into the Sewers of Paris
2. The Impostor
3. The Dynamite Truck
4. Wings Aflame
5. The False Trail
6. The Stolen Passport
7. False Faces
8. Shadowed
9. The Missing Heirloom
10. Sinister Shadows
11. The Betrayal
12. Flames of Fate
13. The Crisis
14. Hidden Dangers
15. The Confession

== See also ==
- List of film serials
- List of film serials by studio
