= The Great Sensation =

1925 film

- Directed by: Jay Marchant
- Written by: Douglas Z. Doty
- Produced by: Harry Cohn
- Starring: William Fairbanks; Pauline Garon; Lloyd Whitlock
- Cinematography: George Meehan
- Production company: Columbia Pictures
- Distributed by: Columbia Pictures
- Release date: September 13, 1925
- Running time: 50 minutes
- Country: United States
- Languages: Silent; English intertitles

The Great Sensation is a 1925 American silent drama film directed by Jay Marchant and starring William Fairbanks, Pauline Garon and Lloyd Whitlock. The son of a wealthy family masquerades as a chauffeur, and thwarts the plans of a jewel thief.

== Cast ==
- William Fairbanks as Jack
- Pauline Garon as Peggy Howell
- Lloyd Whitlock as Captain Winslow
- Billy Franey as Harry Ruby
- Winifred Landis as Mrs. Franklin Curtis
- Adelaide Hallock as Mrs. Howell
- William McLaughlin as Mr. Howell
- Pauline Paquette as Maid

== Preservation and status ==
Complete copies are held at the Library of Congress and Filmmuseum.

== Bibliography ==
- Munden, Kenneth White. The American Film Institute Catalog of Motion Pictures Produced in the United States, Part 1. University of California Press, 1997.
