= Speed Mad =

- Lobby card
- Directed by: Jay Marchant
- Story by: Dorothy Howell
- Starring: William Fairbanks; Edith Roberts; Lloyd Whitlock; Melbourne MacDowell
- Cinematography: George Meehan
- Edited by: Charles J. Hunt
- Production company: Perfection Pictures
- Distributed by: Columbia Pictures
- Release date: July 15, 1925
- Running time: 5 reels
- Country: United States
- Language: Silent (English intertitles)

Speed Mad is a 1925 American silent sports drama film directed by Jay Marchant. The film was a co-production between Columbia Pictures and Perfection Pictures. Prints of Speed Mad exist in the Library of Congress film archive.

== Premise ==
The story concerns a young millionaire who also happens to be a speed maniac. But one day, his father decides that racing a motor into all sorts of trouble is a poor way to become president of a real estate company, and kicks him out. So Bill drives away in his demon racer without the least idea of where he will spend the night. Fate, however, is kind even though he upsets a milk truck. and before Bill realizes, he finds himself in love with Betty, a beautiful young girl.

== Cast ==
- William Fairbanks as Bill Sanford
- Edith Roberts as Betty Hampton
- Lloyd Whitlock as Alan Lawton
- Melbourne MacDowell as John Sanford
- John Fox Jr. as Freckles Smithers
- Florence Lee as Grandma Smithers
- Charles K. French as Charles Whitman

== Reception ==
A contemporary review published in The Chicago Herald praised the performance of a Bull Terrier named Buddy, who starred as an unnamed dog.
