= Do or Die (serial) =

1921 film directed by J. P. McGowan

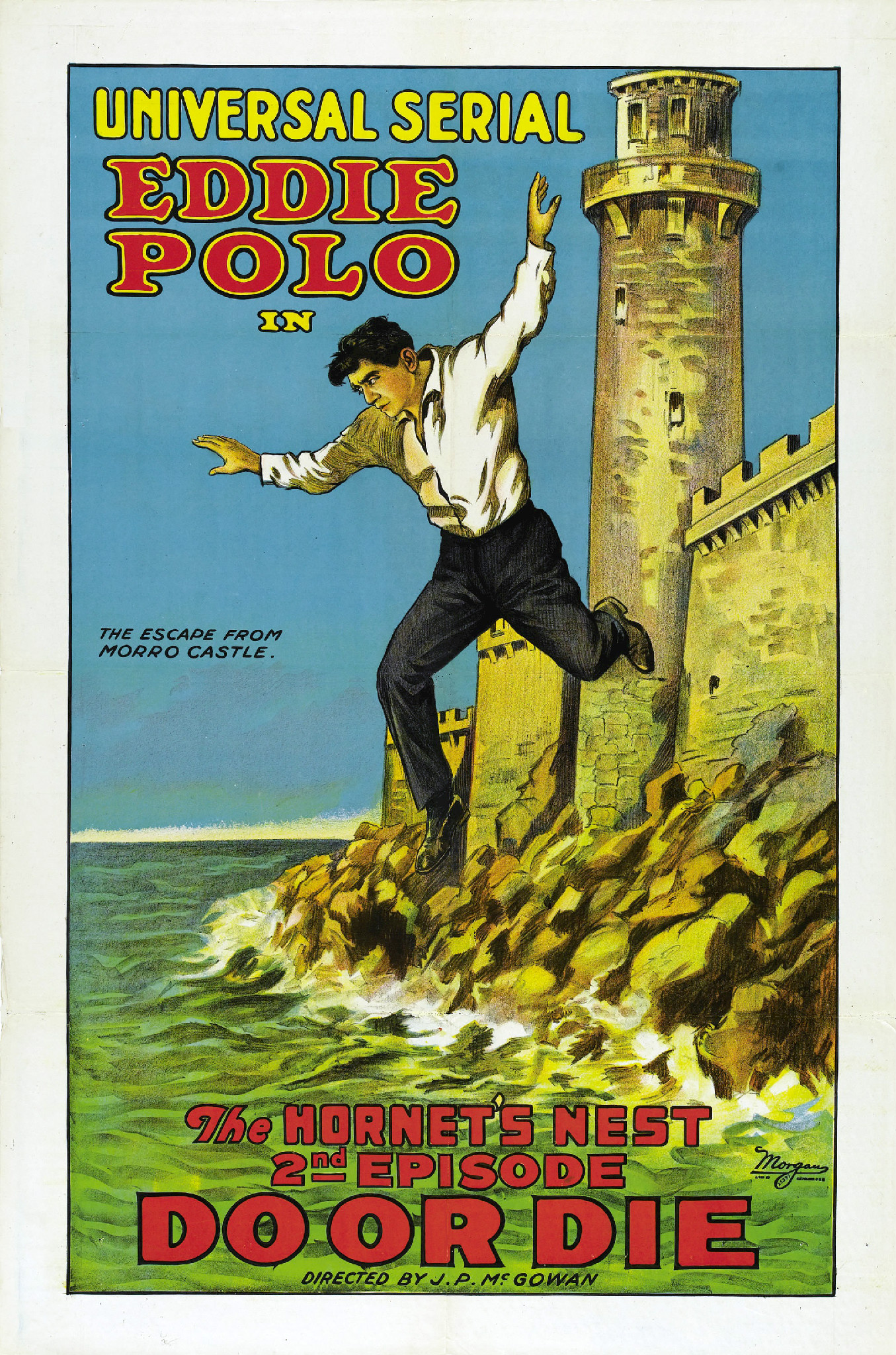
- Film poster for episode 2
- Directed by: J. P. McGowan
- Written by: Anthony Coldeway
- Starring: Eddie Polo; Magda Lane
- Distributed by: Universal Film Manufacturing Co.
- Release date: May 30, 1921
- Running time: 18 episodes
- Country: United States
- Language: Silent (English intertitles)

Do or Die is a 1921 American film serial directed by J. P. McGowan. The film is considered to be lost. The film serial had a working title of The Seal of Satan. Several of its scenes where filmed at the Morro Castle in Havana, Cuba.

== Cast ==
- Eddie Polo as Jack Merton
- Magda Lane as The Mystery Woman
- Inez McDonald as Dolores Nunez
- J. P. McGowan as Captain Alvarez / Satan
- Jay Marchant as Mendez
- Jean Perkins as Rafael

== Chapters ==
1. The Buccaneer's Bride
2. The Hornet's Nest
3. The Secret of the Sea
4. The Hidden Danger
5. The Bandit's Victim
6. The Escape
7. In Hiding
8. The Trap
9. Under Sentence
10. The Secret Cavern
11. Satan's Twin
12. The Lost Ring
13. The Cipher Key
14. The Midnight Attack
15. The Race for Life
16. The Crystal Lake
17. A Fight to the Finish
18. Hidden Treasure

== See also ==
- List of American films of 1921
- List of film serials
- List of film serials by studio
