= King of the Circus =

1920 film

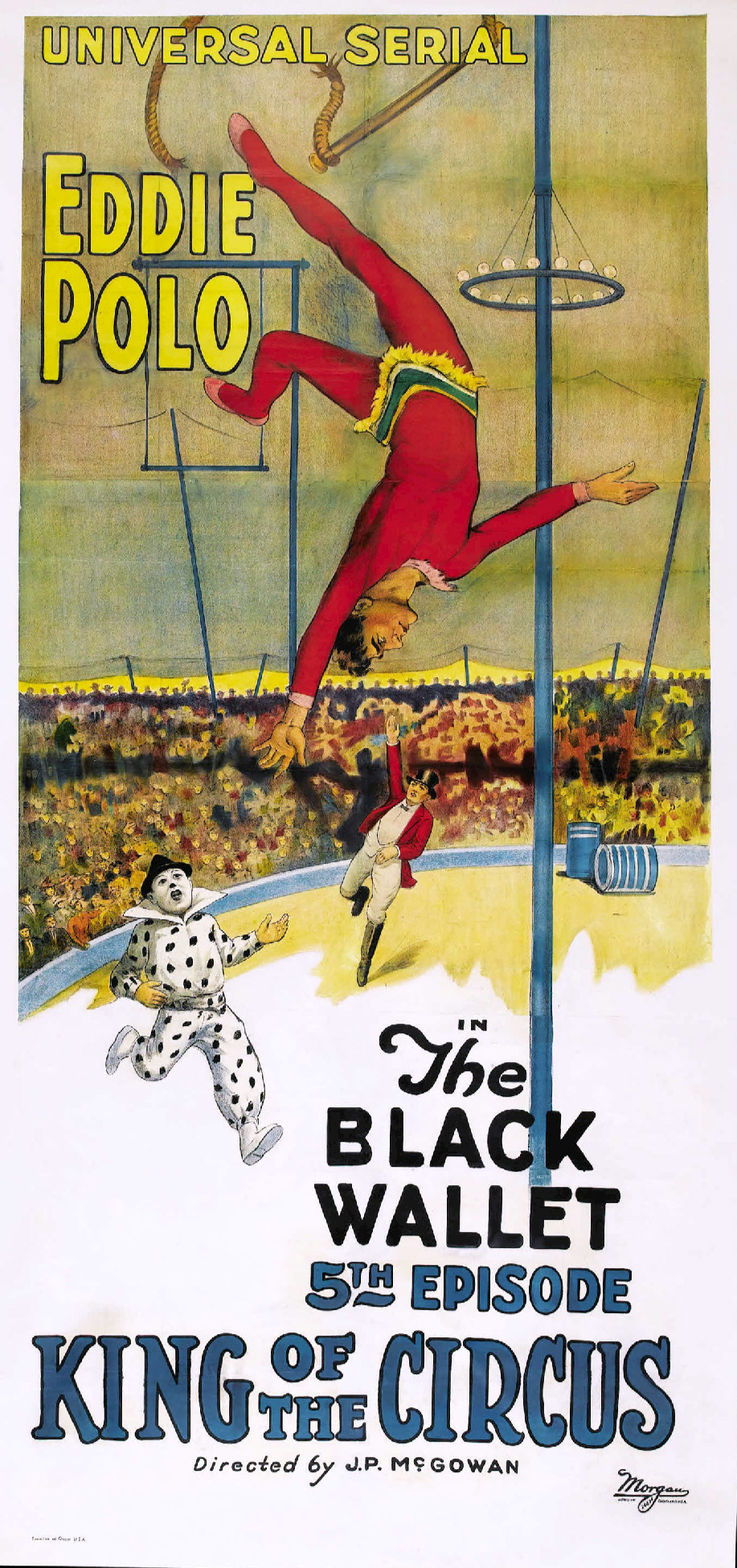
- Film poster
- Directed by: J. P. McGowan
- Written by: Anthony Coldeway
- Starring: Eddie Polo; Corrine Porter
- Distributed by: Universal Film Manufacturing Co.
- Release date: November 22, 1920
- Running time: 18 episodes
- Country: United States
- Language: Silent (English intertitles)

King of the Circus is a 1920 American action film serial directed by J. P. McGowan. The film is considered to be lost.

== Cast ==
- Eddie Polo as Eddie King
- Corrine Porter as Helen Howard
- Kittoria Beveridge as Mary Warren
- Harry Madison as James Gray
- Charles Fortune as John Winters
- J. P. McGowan
- J.J. Bryson
- Dorothy Hagan
- Viola Tasma
- Tom London (as Leonard Clapham)
- Jay Marchant
- Frank Shaw
- Bruce Randall
- Jack Newton

== Chapter titles ==
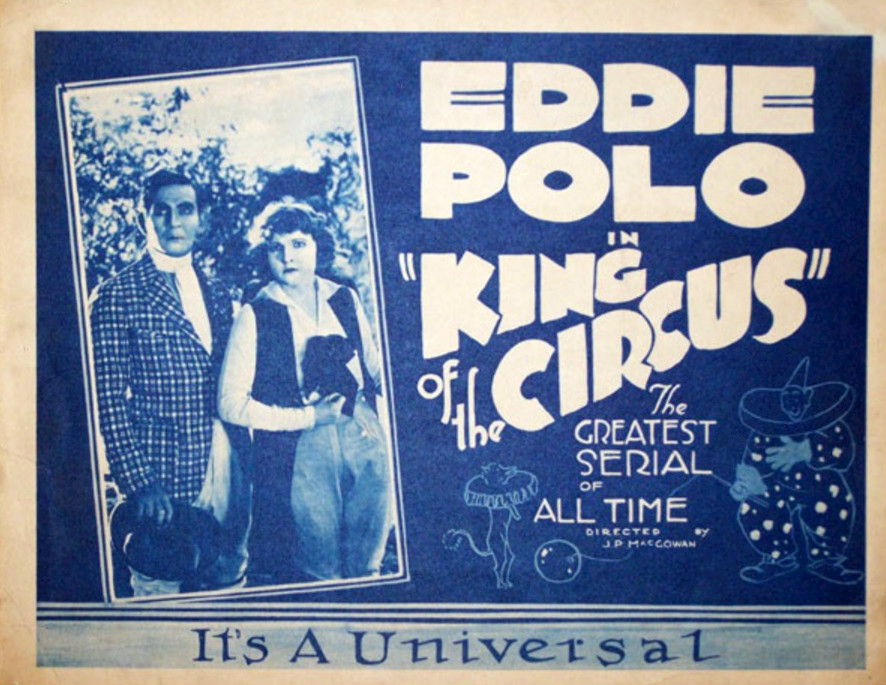
Lobby card

1. Bloody Money
2. The Mushroom Bullet
3. Stolen Evidence
4. Facing Death
5. The Black Wallet
6. The Lion's Claws
7. Over the City
8. Treachery
9. Dynamite
10. The Mystic Power (aka The Mystic's Power)
11. Man and Beast
12. Deep Waters
13. A Fight for Life
14. Out of the Clouds
15. The Woman in Black
16. The Cradle of Death
17. The Final Reckoning
18. The Lost Heritage

== See also ==
- List of film serials
- List of film serials by studio
- List of lost films
