= The Ghost City =

1923 film

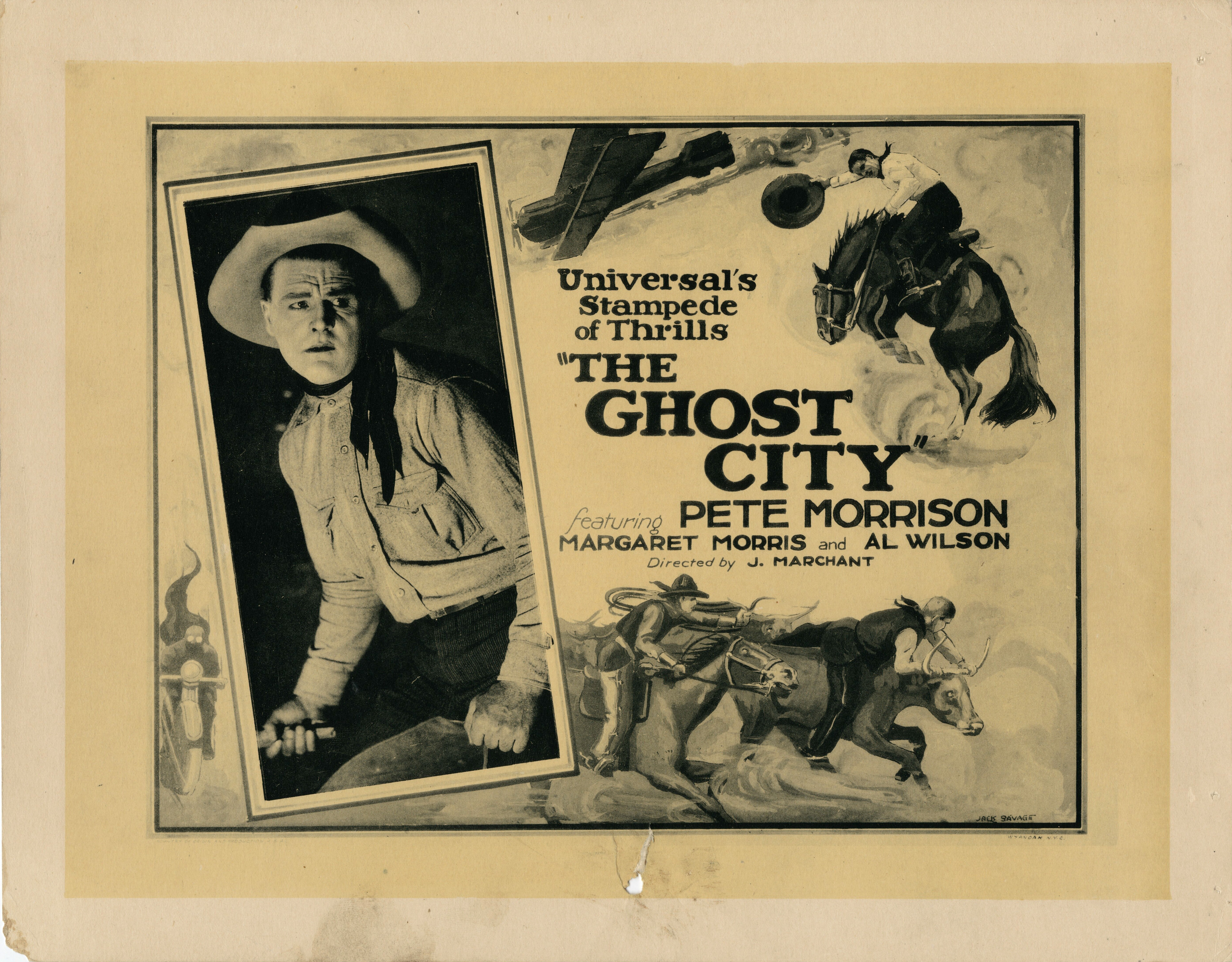
- Lobby card
- Directed by: Jay Marchant
- Written by: George W. Pyper
- Starring: Pete Morrison; Margaret Morris
- Distributed by: Universal Pictures
- Release date: December 3, 1923
- Running time: 15 episodes
- Country: United States
- Languages: Silent; English intertitles

The Ghost City is a 1923 American silent Western film serial directed by Jay Marchant. It is considered to be a lost film.

== Plot ==
As described in a film magazine, in Sunshine Valley, California, there is trouble aplenty brewing. Laughing Larry Laughton and his pal, Sagebrush Hilton, are informed that unless the ranch owners place ten thousand dollars in a designated spot on a certain day, the reservoir supplying the valley with water will be drained. To show that they are in earnest, they have taken two feet of water already. At the same time, Austin Sinclair, wealthy California ranch owner, having purchased Ghost City Ranch in Sunshine Valley, receives word in his home in New Orleans that a conspiracy is in progress to take the ranch away from him. Unable to go to California himself on account of a disabled foot, his daughter Alice offers to go for him and gets her cousin Raymond Moreton, a daring young aviator, to take her in his plane. Agents of Jasper Harwell, who is trying by unfair means to get the ranch from Sinclair, have been installed in the New Orleans home and, learning of Alice's plans, try to prevent them from getting away. They take the automobile, but Alice and Raymond get horses and manage to reach the plane just before them by taking several short cuts. Once in the plane they have an uneventful journey until they are within a few miles of their destination. Here the engine develops trouble and they are forced to land. Alice sees a couple of men and decides to ask them if she can borrow some horses. On the way she gets right in the path of a stampeding herd of cattle. Laughing Larry happens to be one of the men she was heading for and he sees her predicament. Riding his horse down a steep grade he reaches her side just in time. As they race ahead of the herd, Larry's horse falls and they are thrown right under the rushing hoofs.

Saved from the onrush of the stampeding cattle, Alice, on her way to the Harwell ranch to make the payment that will save the ranch at Ghost City for her father, thanks her rescuer Larry Lawton, a young rancher, and explains to him her need for haste. He takes her to the ranch by a short cut. When Harwell tries to refuse payment on the charge that it is overdue, Larry shows him that his own watch shows there is still a few minutes left and makes him give Alice a receipt. That afternoon a meeting is held to determine what action is to be taken regarding the threatening notes. Theses say that unless ten thousand dollars are paid by a certain date, the water will be drained from the reservoir, ruining the valley. There is much debate as to whether or not the blackmail should be paid. Harwell is for paying the money and saving the cattle. Larry and his pal Hilton are for detecting the blackmailers before they do their damage. When Harwell's man Mort Carley sees that Hilton is gaining favor for his idea, he steals a record-book from the table and slips out. Larry sees him and follows quickly. Carley has jumped on a motorcycle and Larry takes after him on his fleet horse. An exciting chase ends shortly after Larry has caught up with Carley and jumps to the seat of the motorcycle. Carley loses control of the machine and it plunges off a high cliff, bounces on a ledge far below and continues on down into the lake below. This and other adventures follow as Larry and Alice seek to preserve the ranch at Ghost City.

== Cast ==
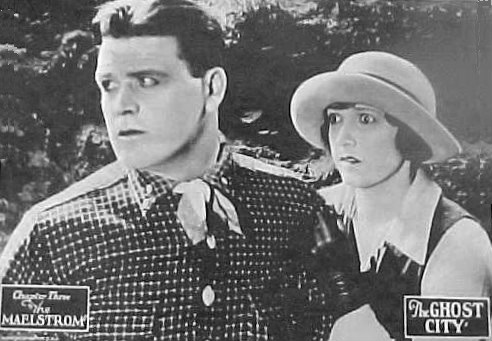
Lobby card for Chapter 3

- Pete Morrison as Laughing Larry Newton
- Margaret Morris as Alice Sinclair
- Al Wilson as Raymond Moreton
- Frank Rice as Sagebrush Hilton
- Bud Osborne as Jasper Harwell
- Lola Todd as Ginger Harwell
- Slim Cole as Mort Carley
- Alfred Allen as Austin Sinclair
- Princess Neela as Maria de Ortega
- Valerio Olivo as Manuel Ortega
- William Quinn as Henchman (uncredited)
- Frank Tomick as Henchman (uncredited)

== Chapter titles ==
1. The Thundering Herd
2. The Bulldogger
3. The Maelstrom
4. The Water Trap
5. Foiling the Rustlers
6. Death's Specter
7. Stolen Gold
8. The Midnight Intruder
9. Talons of the Night
10. The Frame-Up
11. Ambushed
12. The Betrayal
13. Man to Man
14. Flames of Vengeance
15. Face to Face

== See also ==
- List of film serials
- List of film serials by studio
- List of lost films
