= The Great Gamble =

2009 book by Gregory Feifer

The Great Gamble: The Soviet War in Afghanistan
- Author: Gregory Feifer
- ISBN: 0061143197

The Great Gamble: The Soviet War in Afghanistan is a 2009 book by Gregory Feifer about the 1979-1989 Soviet–Afghan War.
