= Perils of the Yukon =

1922 American silent film

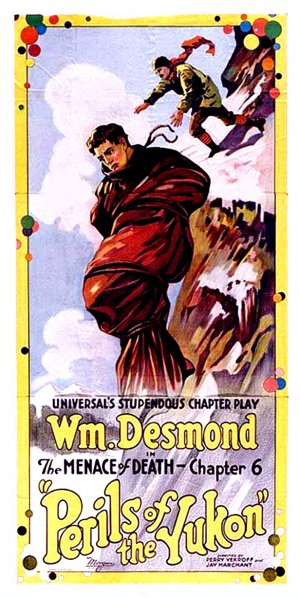
- Film poster
- Directed by: Jay Marchant; J. P. McGowan; Perry N. Vekroff
- Written by: George Morgan; George H. Plympton
- Starring: William Desmond; Laura La Plante
- Distributed by: Universal Film Manufacturing Co.
- Release date: July 24, 1922
- Running time: 15 episodes
- Country: United States
- Language: Silent (English intertitles)

Perils of the Yukon is a 1922 American Northern silent film serial directed by Jay Marchant, J. P. McGowan and Perry N. Vekroff. This serial was presumed to be lost, but a copy is preserved by the Belgian Cinematek in Brussels.

== Cast ==
- William Desmond as Jack Merrill Sr. / Jack Merrill Jr.
- Laura La Plante as Olga
- Fred R. Stanton as Ivan Petroff (as Fred Stanton)
- Joseph McDermott as Hogan (as Joe McDermott)
- George A. Williams as Scott McPherson
- Mack V. Wright as Lew Scully
- Fred Kohler as Captain Whipple
- Neola May as Neewah (as Princess Neela)
- Chief Harris as Numa
- Joseph W. Girard (as Joseph Girard)
- Ruth Royce

== See also ==
- List of film serials
- List of film serials by studio
- List of lost films
