= Jay Marchant =

American film director (1888–1962)

- Born: January 7, 1888; Tripp County, South Dakota, U.S.
- Died: June 14, 1962 (aged 74); Los Angeles County, California, U.S.
- Occupations: Film director, actor
- Years active: 1921-1925

Jay Marchant (January 7, 1888 – June 14, 1962) was an American film director and actor of the silent era. He directed 22 films between 1921 and 1925, including five film serials for the Universal Film Manufacturing Company. He was born in Tripp County, South Dakota and died in Los Angeles County, California.

== Career ==
In 1923, Marchant directed the Western serial film The Ghost City.

== Selected filmography ==
- King of the Circus (1920)
- Do or Die (1921)
- Perils of the Yukon (1922)
- The Ghost City (1923)
- The Iron Man (1924)
- The Great Circus Mystery (1925)
- The Fighting Ranger (1925)
- The Great Sensation (1925)
- Speed Mad (1925)
