= Eddie Polo =

American actor

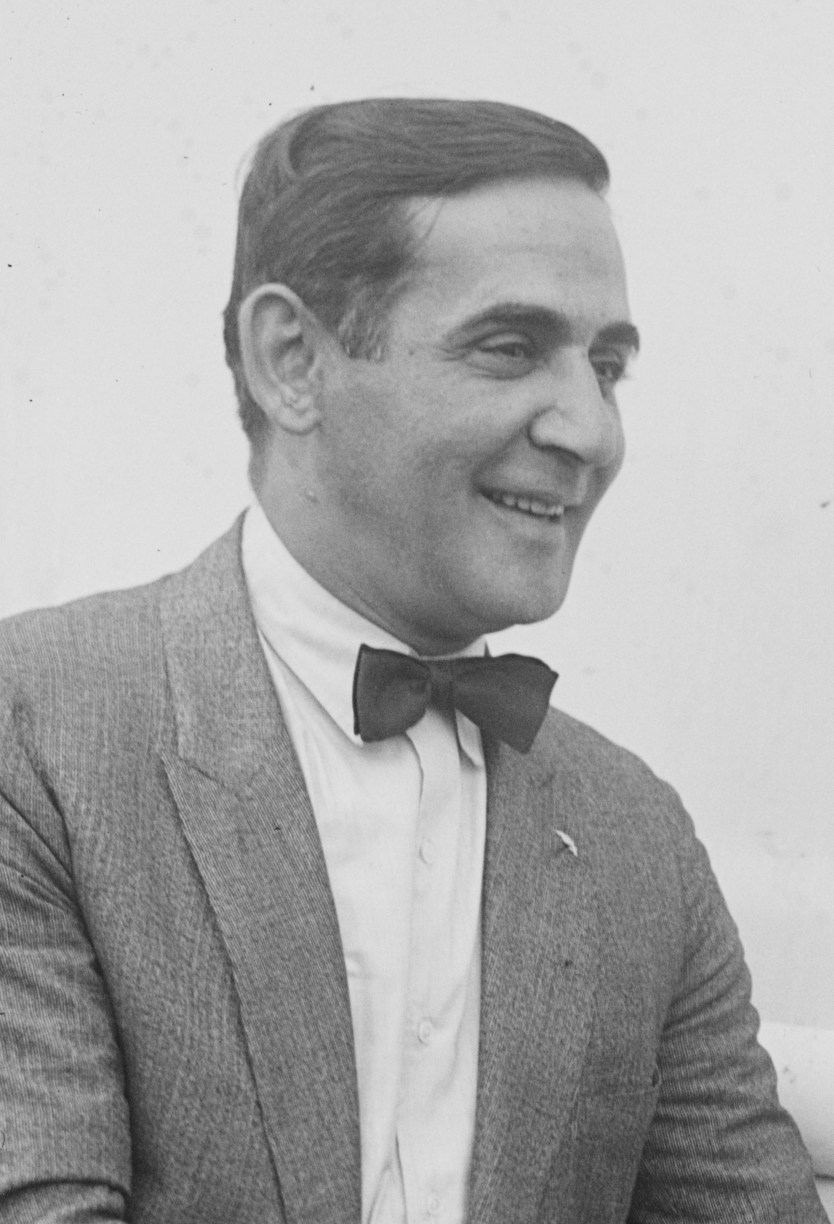
- Polo in 1922
- Born: Edward W. Wyman / Weimer; 1 February 1875; Vienna, Austria-Hungary
- Died: 14 June 1961 (aged 86); Hollywood, Los Angeles, California, U.S.
- Other name: Eddie Weimer
- Occupation: Actor
- Years active: 1913–1951
- Children: Malvine Polo

Eddie Polo (1 February 1875 – 14 June 1961) was a Vienna-born American actor of the silent era. He was of Jewish descent.

== Biography ==
He was born Edward W. Wyman or Weimer in Vienna, Austria-Hungary on 1 February 1875. With his brother Sam, he was the trapeze act The Flying Cordovas. Beginning in 1913, he appeared in serials and films in the United States and became an action star in Germany in the late 1920s. After his acting career ended in the mid-1940s, he worked as a makeup artist.

He was the father of actress Malvina Polo (1903–2000), best remembered as the mentally handicapped girl preyed upon for rape in Erich von Stroheim's Foolish Wives (1922). His brother was the acrobat, actor and makeup artist Sam Polo (1872–1966).

Polo died on 14 June 1961 in Hollywood, California from a heart attack. He was 86.

== Filmography ==
Year	Title	Role	Notes
1915	The Broken Coin	Rolleaux	
1915	The New Adventures of Terence O'Rourke	Eddie	
1915	Graft		Serial
1915	Lord John's Journal		
1916	The Adventures of Peg o' the Ring	Polo	
1916	Liberty	Pedro	Serial; Alternative titles: The Fangs of the Wolf; Liberty, a Daughter of the U.S.A.
1917	The Bronze Bride	White Feather	
1917	Money Madness	'Harford' Red	
1917	A Kentucky Cinderella	Ed Long	
1917	The Gray Ghost	Marco	Serial
1917	The Plow Woman	Bill Matthews	
1917	The Bull's Eye	Cody	Serial
1918	The Lure of the Circus	Eddie Somers	Serial
1920	The Vanishing Dagger	John Edward Grant	Serial
1920	King of the Circus	Eddie King	Serial
1921	Do or Die	Jack Merton	Serial
1921	The Terror Streak	Cyclone Smith	
1921	The Secret Four		Serial
1922	Captain Kidd	Edward Davis	Serial
1922	Der Fluch der Habgier		
1923	The Knock on the Door		
1923	Prepared to Die	John Pendleton Smythe	
1927	The Owl	Jack Clifford	Part 1, 2
1927	Der Geheimtresor	Eddie	
1928	Eddy Polo in the Wasp's Nest	Eddy Polo	
1928	Hands Up, Eddy Polo	Eddy Polo	
1929	On the Reeperbahn at Half Past Midnight	Heini Box	
1929	Hände hoch, hier Eddy Polo	Eddy Polo	
1929	The Daredevil Reporter	Reporter	
1929	Der gefesselte Polo	Eddy Polo	
1929	Geheimpolizisten	Franz Hayn	
1929	Rache für Eddy	Sergeant Eddy Webster	
1930	Of Life and Death	Artist	
1930	Witnesses Wanted	Himself	
1932	All Is at Stake		
1940	It's a Date	Quarter Master	
1940	La Conga Nights	Señor Boca	Uncredited
1940	Son of Roaring Dan	Charlie Gregg	
1940	Spring Parade	Cafe Proprietor	Uncredited
1940	Law and Order	Bartender Ed	Uncredited
1941	The Wolf Man	Churchgoer	Uncredited
1942	Don Winslow of the Navy	Lab Assistant	Serial, [Chs. 8-9], Uncredited
1942	Gang Busters	Pilot	Serial, [Chs. 1-2], Uncredited
1942	The Secret Code	Special Delivery Messenger	Serial, [Ch.7], Uncredited
1942	Deep in the Heart of Texas	Townsman	Uncredited
1943	Honeymoon Lodge	Gas Station Attendant	Uncredited
1943	Crazy House	Stooge	Uncredited
1944	The Climax	Stagehand	Uncredited
1946	Two Sisters from Boston	Waiter	Uncredited
