= List of Universal Pictures films (1920–1929) =

This is a list of films produced or distributed by Universal Pictures in 1920–1929, founded in 1912 as the Universal Film Manufacturing Company. It is the main motion picture production and distribution arm of Universal Studios, a subsidiary of the NBCUniversal division of Comcast.

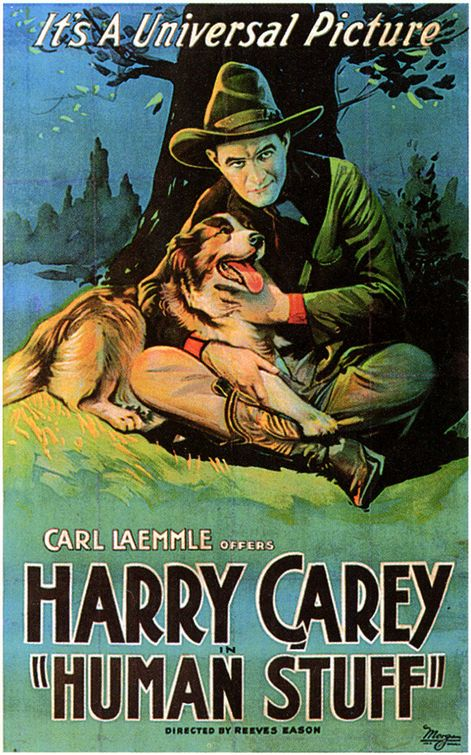
Poster for Human Stuff (1920)

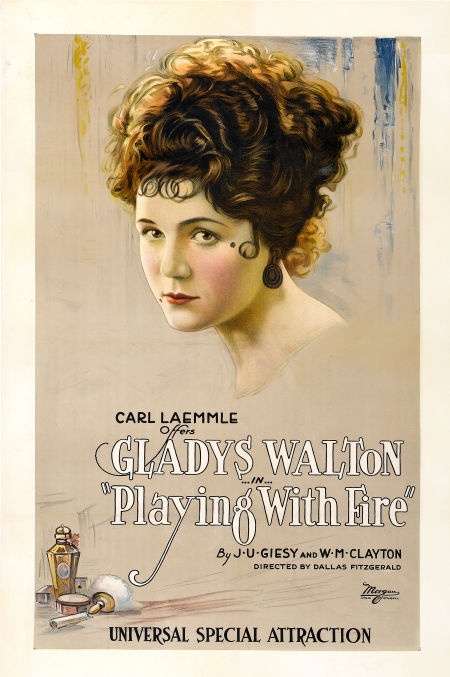
Poster for Playing with Fire (1921)

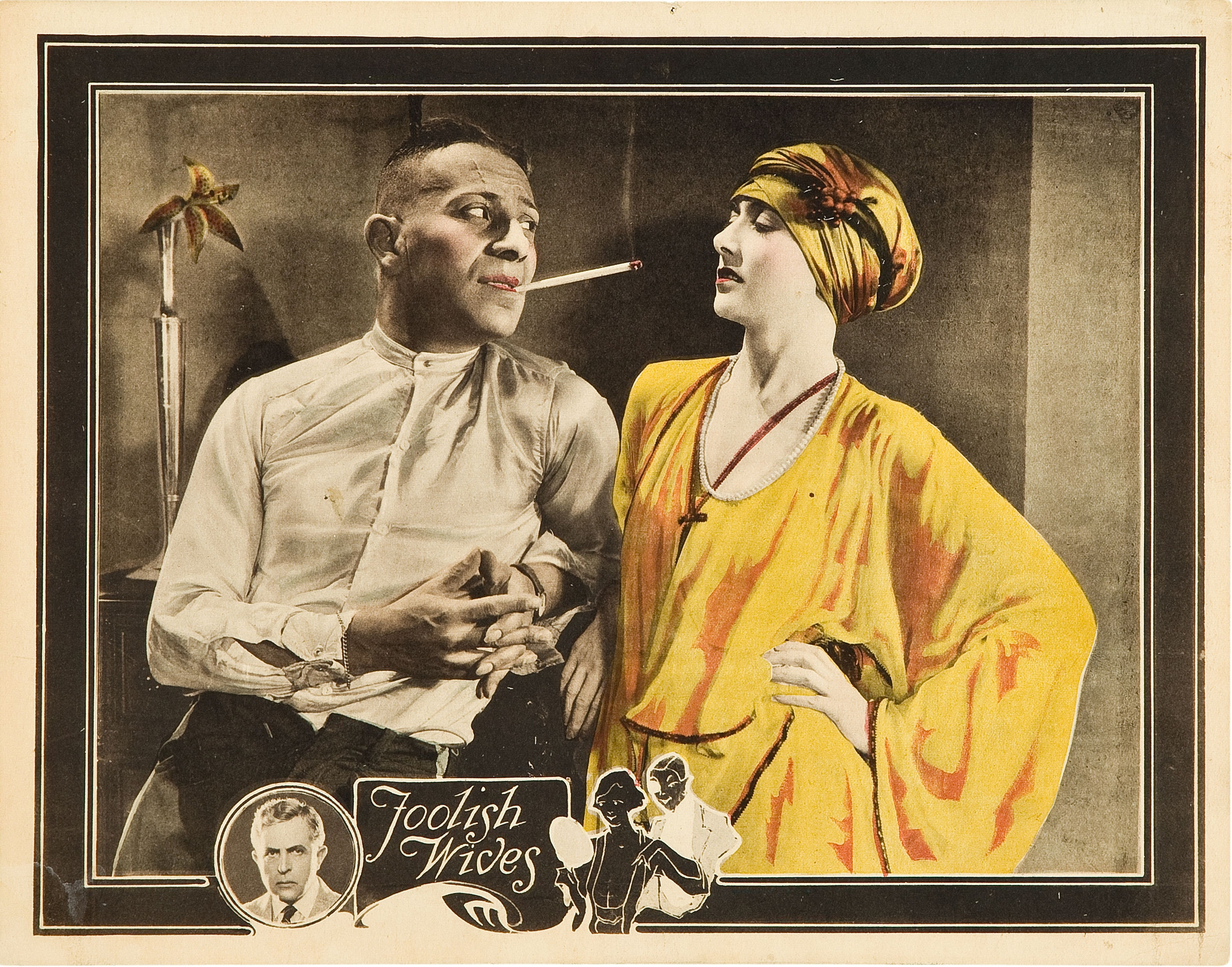
Lobby card for Foolish Wives (1922)

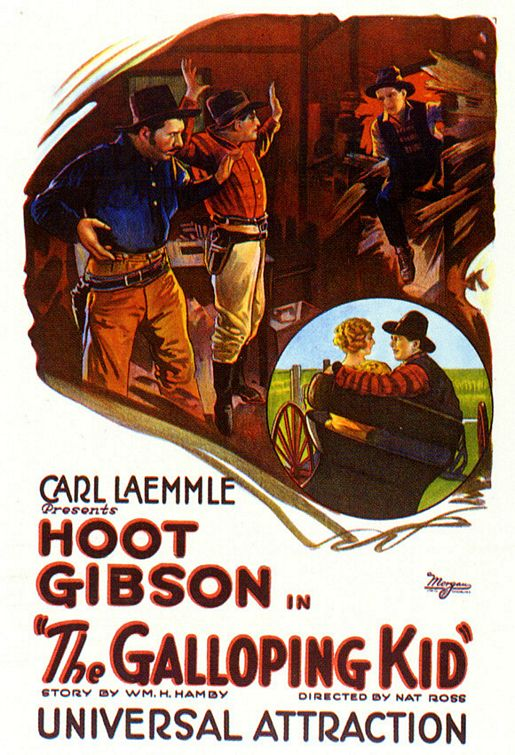
Poster for The Galloping Kid (1922)

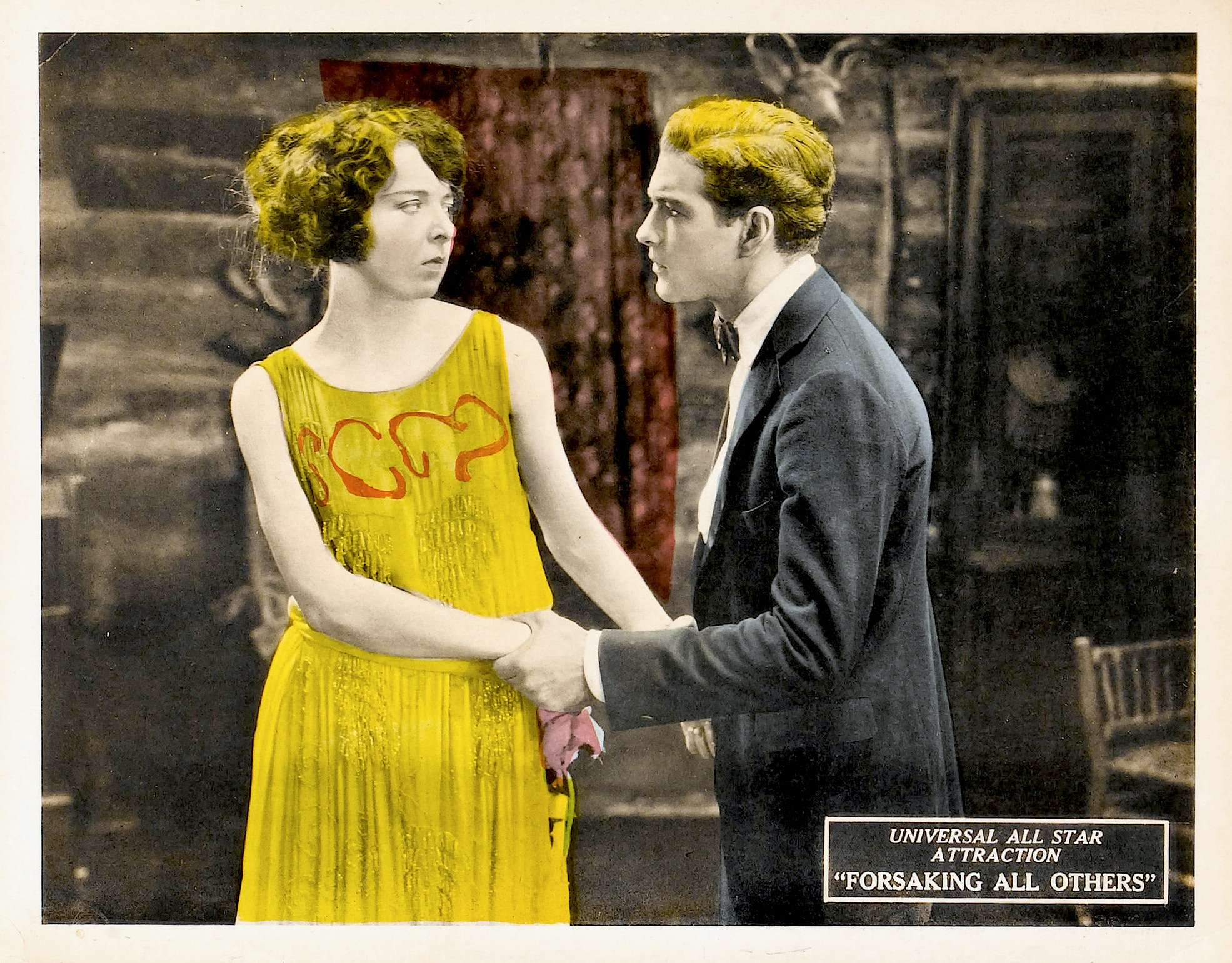
Lobby card for Forsaking All Others (1922)

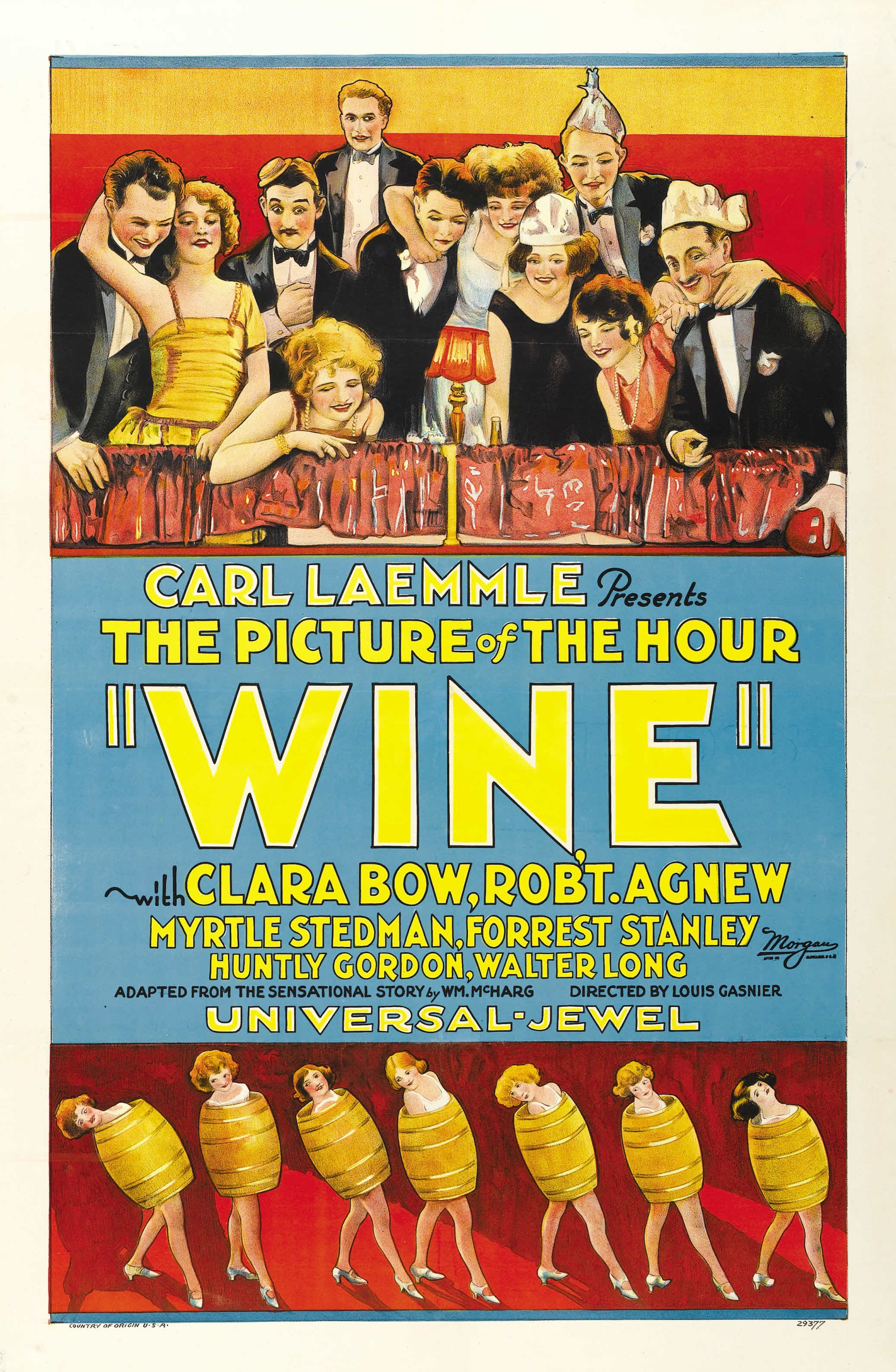
Poster for Wine (1924)

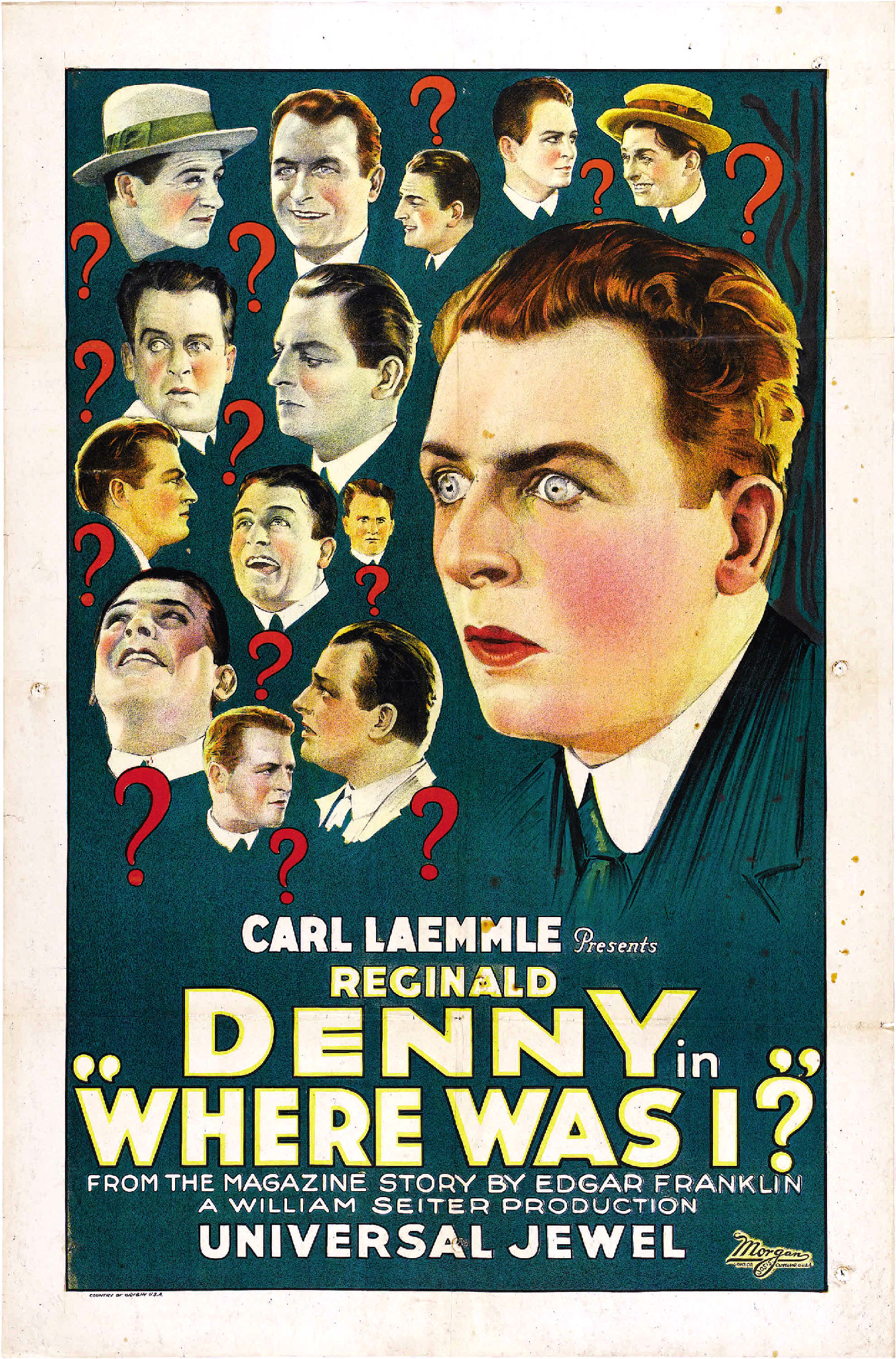
Poster for Where Was I? (1925)

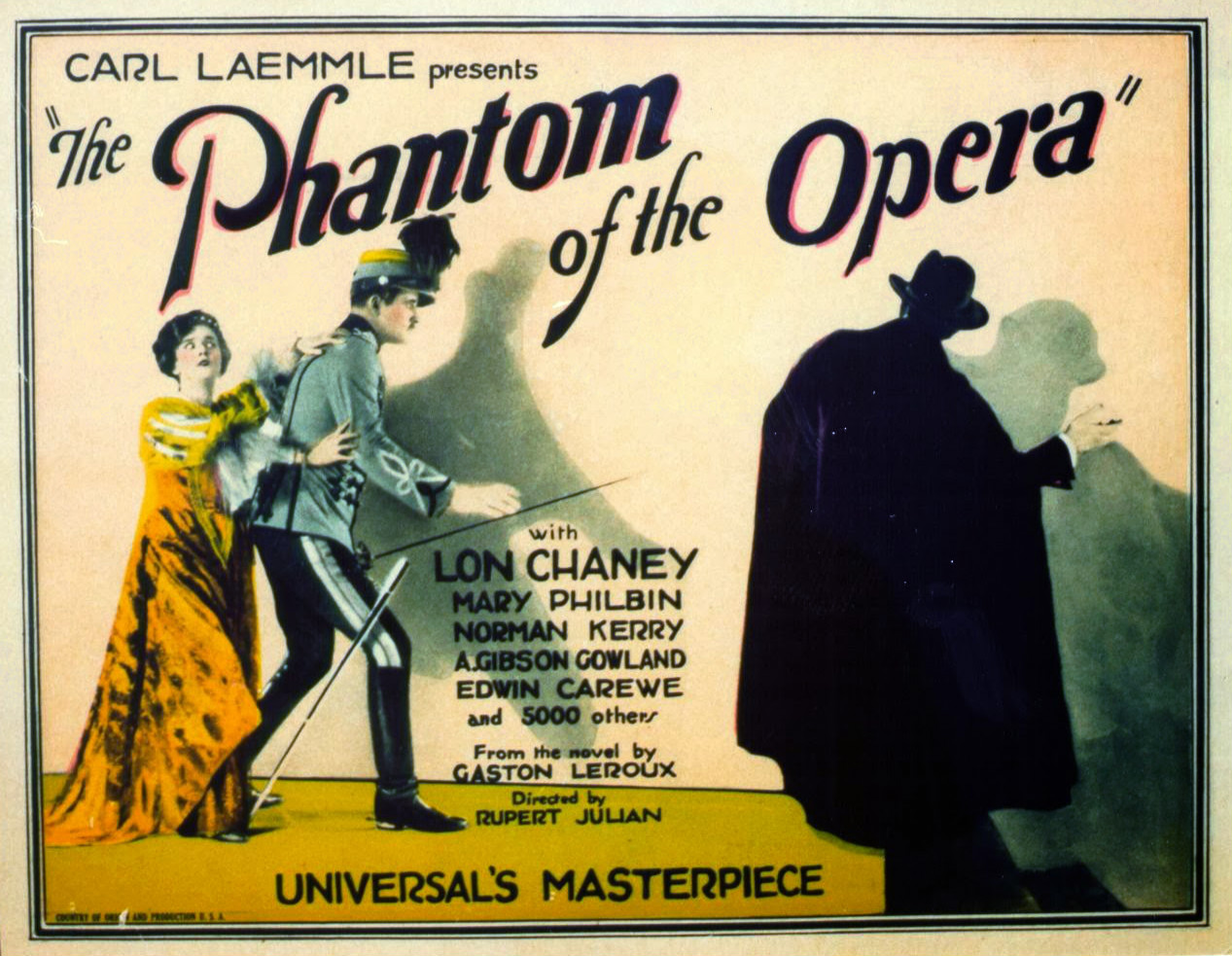
Lobby card for The Phantom of the Opera (1925)

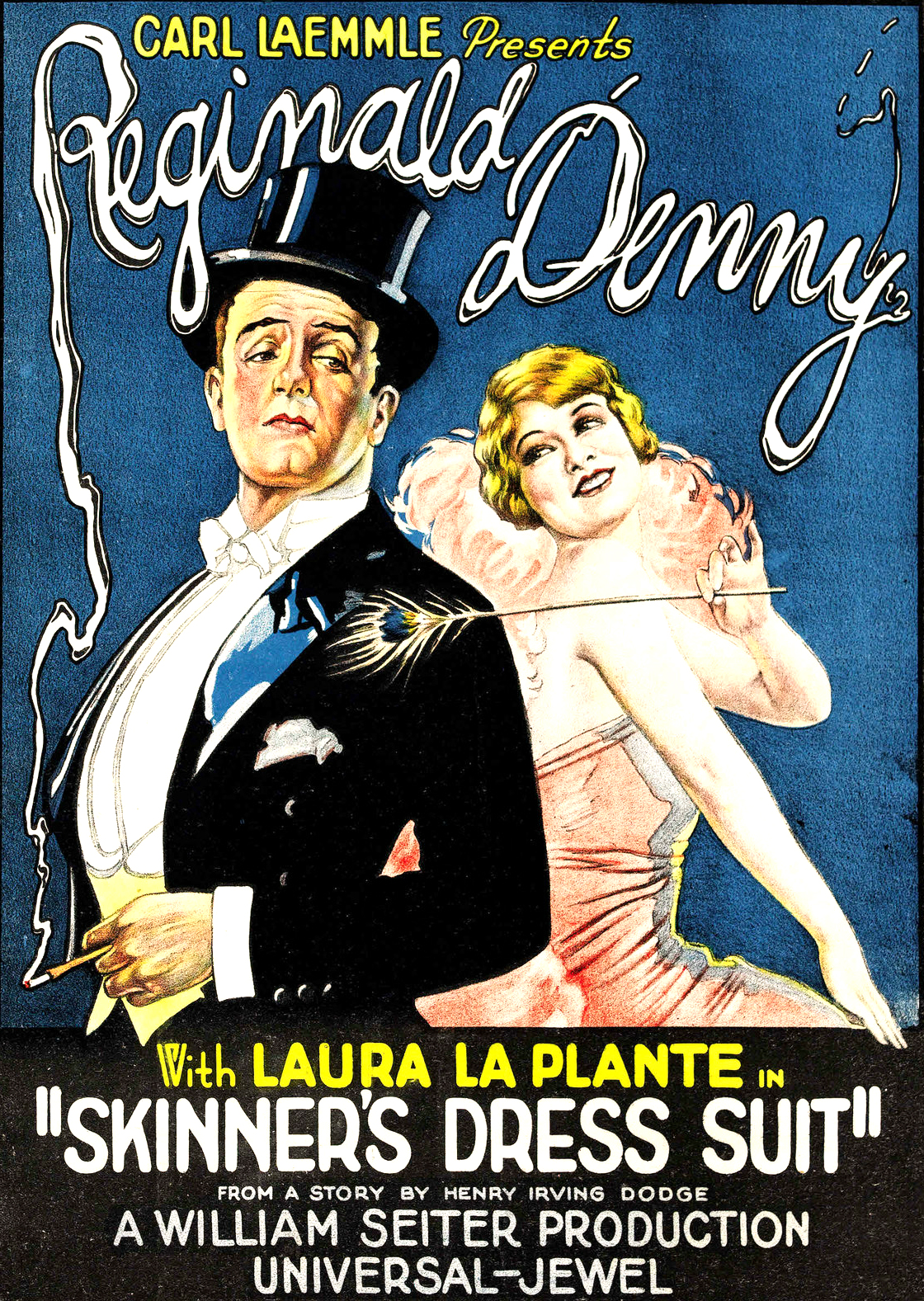
Poster for Skinner's Dress Suit (1926)

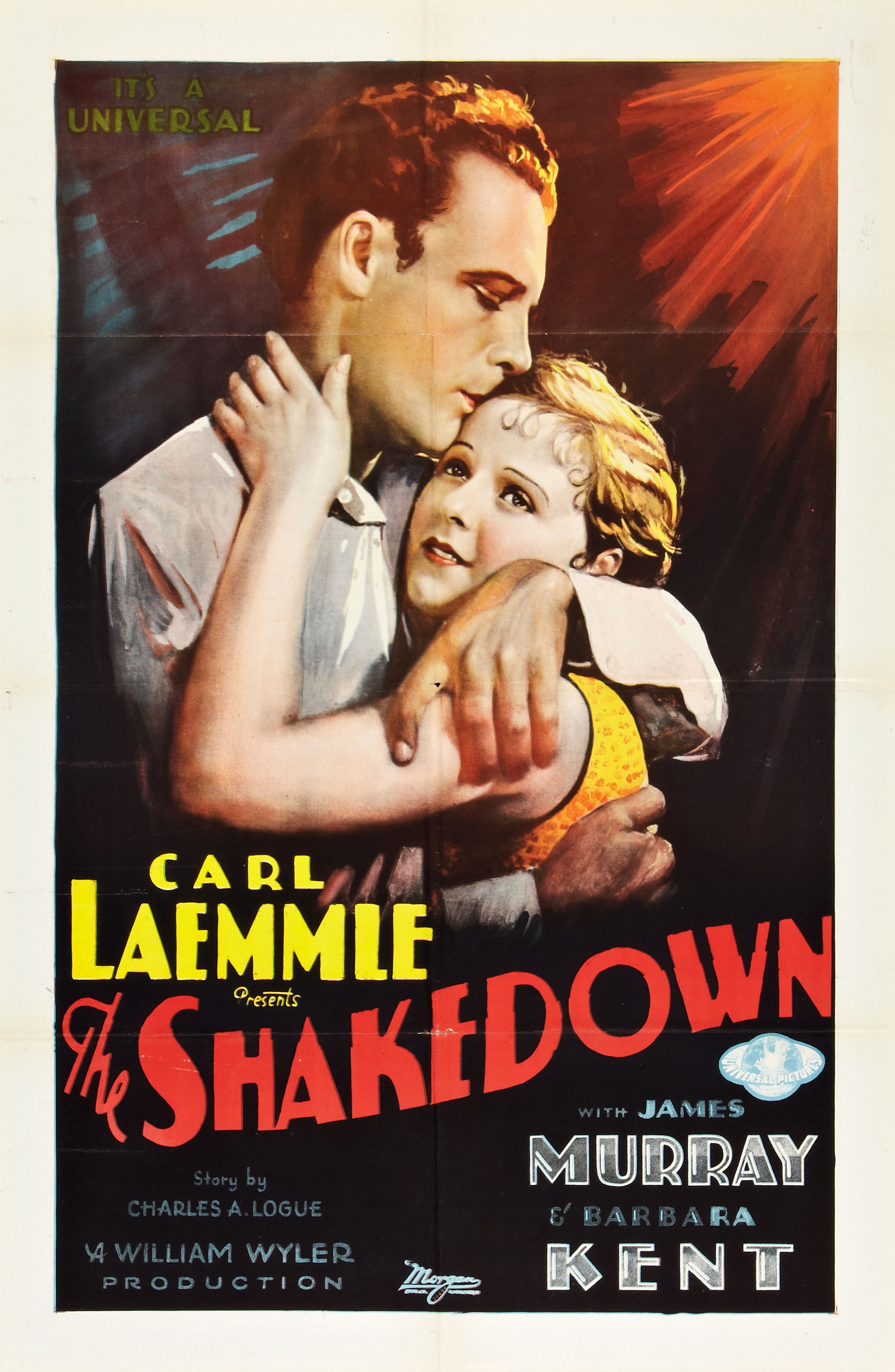
Poster for The Shakedown (1929)

== 1920 ==
Release date	Title	Notes
January 11, 1920	The Prince of Avenue A	lost
January 12, 1920	The Triflers	lost
January 27, 1920	The Phantom Melody	lost
February 9, 1920	Rouge and Riches	lost
February 9, 1920	Elmo the Fearless	lost
March 1, 1920	The Peddler of Lies	lost
March 8, 1920	The Forged Bride	lost
March 22, 1920	Overland Red	
March 27, 1920	The Virgin of Stamboul	
March 29, 1920	Burnt Wings	lost
April 5, 1920	The Road to Divorce	lost
April 26, 1920	The Moon Riders	lost
April 28, 1920	Locked Lips	lost
April 1920	Her Five-Foot Highness	lost
May 3, 1920	Bullet Proof	lost
May 17, 1920	The Girl in Number 29	lost
May 24, 1920	The Path She Chose	lost
May 31, 1920	Everything But the Truth	lost
June 7, 1920	The Vanishing Dagger	lost
June 21, 1920	Alias Miss Dodd	lost
June 28, 1920	Human Stuff	lost
June 1920	A Tokio Siren	
July 4, 1920	Shipwrecked Among Cannibals	lost
July 6, 1920	Under Crimson Skies	lost
July 12, 1920	The Red Lane	lost
July 17, 1920	The Girl in the Rain	lost
July 19, 1920	La La Lucille	lost
July 25, 1920	The Breath of the Gods	lost
August 6, 1920	The Adorable Savage	lost
August 8, 1920	The Devil's Pass Key	lost
August 23, 1920	The Dragon's Net	lost
August 23, 1920	Blue Streak McCoy	lost
August 1920	Under Northern Lights	lost
September 1920	Hitchin' Posts	lost
September 6, 1920	Once to Every Woman	lost
September 6, 1920	In Folly's Trail	lost
September 20, 1920	The Secret Gift	lost
September 25, 1920	Pink Tights	
September 27, 1920	Once a Plumber	lost
October 25, 1920	Wanted at Headquarters	lost
October 1920	The Gilded Dream	lost
October 1920	Sundown Slim	lost
November 13, 1920	Double Danger	
November 21, 1920	The Flaming Disc	lost
November 22, 1920	West Is West	lost
November 22, 1920	King of the Circus	lost
November 1920	Honor Bound	lost
November 1920	Fixed by George	
December 26, 1920	Outside the Law	
December 1920	White Youth	lost
December 1920	Two Kinds of Love	lost
December 1920	Risky Business	lost
December 1920	Beautifully Trimmed	

== 1921 ==
Release date	Title	Notes
January 1921	A Shocking Night	
January 1921	Tiger True	lost
January 2, 1921	Hearts Up	lost
January 22, 1921	The Torrent	lost
January 24, 1921	Rich Girl, Poor Girl	lost
January 31, 1921	The Mad Marriage	lost
February 1921	The Fire Cat	lost
February 1921	Society Secrets	lost
February 14, 1921	Colorado	lost
March 14, 1921	The Unknown Wife	lost
March 15, 1921	The Diamond Queen	lost
March 1921	The Smart Sex	lost
March 1921	The Magnificent Brute	lost
March 1921	All Dolled Up	
April 9, 1921	The Freeze-Out	lost
April 16, 1921	Wolves of the North	
April 25, 1921	Desperate Youth	lost
April 1921	The Dangerous Moment	lost
April 1921	The Big Adventure	lost
May 1921	The Blazing Trail	
May 1921	Reputation	lost
May 9, 1921	The Wallop	lost
May 16, 1921	Cheated Love	lost
May 30, 1921	The Man Tamer	lost
May 30, 1921	Do or Die	lost
May 30, 1921	The White Horseman	lost
June 1921	The Beautiful Gambler	lost
June 1921	Desperate Trails	lost
June 1921	Thunder Island	lost
June 13, 1921	The Fighting Lover	lost
June 18, 1921	The Heart of Arizona	Short film
July 1921	The Man Trackers	lost
July 1921	Short Skirts	lost
July 4, 1921	The Kiss	lost
July 21, 1921	Terror Trail	lost
July 24, 1921	The Fox	lost
July 25, 1921	Luring Lips	lost
August 1921	Opened Shutters	lost
August 8, 1921	Danger Ahead	lost
August 13, 1921	The Danger Man	Short film
August 28, 1921	The Shark Master	
September 12, 1921	Action	lost
September 18, 1921	Moonlight Follies	lost
September 19, 1921	No Woman Knows	
September 19, 1921	The Rowdy	lost
September 25, 1921	The Rage of Paris	lost
September 26, 1921	Winners of the West	lost
October 10, 1921	Red Courage	lost
October 17, 1921	Go Straight	incomplete
October 23, 1921	Conflict	
October 24, 1921	High Heels	lost
October 31, 1921	Nobody's Fool	lost
November 5, 1921	Sure Fire	lost
November 14, 1921	The Millionaire	
November 21, 1921	False Kisses	lost
November 28, 1921	Dr. Jim	lost
November 1921	A Daughter of the Law	
December 5, 1921	A Parisian Scandal	lost
December 10, 1921	Dream Girl	Short film
December 12, 1921	Cheated Hearts	lost
December 16, 1921	The Terror Streak	Short film
December 19, 1921	Playing with Fire	lost
December 19, 1921	The Secret Four	lost
December 24, 1921	The Fire Eater	lost
December 31, 1921	A Battle of Wits	Short film

== 1922 ==
Release date	Title	Notes
January 2, 1922	Shattered Dreams	lost
January 7, 1922	The Deputy's Double Cross	Short film
January 9, 1922	Across the Deadline	lost
January 11, 1922	Foolish Wives	
January 16, 1922	Don't Get Personal	lost
January 23, 1922	With Stanley in Africa	lost
January 30, 1922	The Guttersnipe	lost
February 6, 1922	The Scrapper	lost
February 13, 1922	Headin' West	lost
February 27, 1922	The Golden Gallows	lost
March 4, 1922	The Wise Kid	lost
March 6, 1922	Tracked to Earth	lost
March 20, 1922	Man to Man	
March 22, 1922	The Adventures of Robinson Crusoe	lost
March 27, 1922	The Dangerous Little Demon	lost
April 3, 1922	The Bearcat	lost
April 24, 1922	A Wonderful Wife	lost
May 1, 1922	The Man Who Married His Own Wife	lost
May 8, 1922	Second Hand Rose	lost
May 9, 1922	The Trap	
May 22, 1922	Kissed	
May 29, 1922	Step on It!	lost
June 5, 1922	The Black Bag	lost
June 18, 1922	The Storm	
June 19, 1922	Out of the Silent North	lost
June 26, 1922	Her Night of Nights	lost
July 3, 1922	Trimmed	lost
July 12, 1922	Apartment Wanted	Short film
July 23, 1922	The Trouper	lost
July 24, 1922	Afraid to Fight	lost
July 24, 1922	Perils of the Yukon	
July 31, 1922	The Married Flapper	lost
August 1922	Human Hearts	
August 4, 1922	The Loaded Door	lost
August 21, 1922	Don't Shoot	lost
August 28, 1922	Paid Back	lost
September 4, 1922	Top o' the Morning	lost
September 11, 1922	The Galloping Kid	lost
September 11, 1922	In the Days of Buffalo Bill	lost
September 18, 1922	Caught Bluffing	lost
September 25, 1922	Confidence	lost
October 1922	The Kentucky Derby	
October 2, 1922	The Long Chance	lost
October 9, 1922	The Girl Who Ran Wild	lost
October 16, 1922	The Lone Hand	lost
October 23, 1922	Wolf Law	lost
October 30, 1922	Broad Daylight	lost
October 30, 1922	The Radio King	lost
November 6, 1922	Under Two Flags	
November 6, 1922	Another Man's Shoes	lost
November 13, 1922	The Lavender Bath Lady	lost
November 13, 1922	The Jilt	lost
November 19, 1922	Ridin' Wild	lost
November 1922	One Wonderful Night	
December 4, 1922	The Altar Stairs	lost
December 10, 1922	Forsaking All Others	lost
December 12, 1922	The Flaming Hour	lost
December 17, 1922	A Dangerous Game	lost
December 24, 1922	The Flirt	lost

== 1923 ==
Release date	Title	Notes
January 1, 1923	Around the World in Eighteen Days	lost
January 7, 1923	The Power of a Lie	lost
January 8, 1923	The Social Buccaneer	lost
January 8, 1923	Kindled Courage	lost
January 15, 1923	The Scarlet Car	lost
January 21, 1923	The Ghost Patrol	lost
January 30, 1923	The First Degree	
February 5, 1923	The Flame of Life	lost
February 9, 1923	The Love Letter	lost
February 19, 1923	The Gentleman from America	lost
February 1923	The Prisoner	lost
March 3, 1923	One of Three	Short film
March 5, 1923	The Bolted Door	lost
March 12, 1923	Gossip	lost
March 12, 1923	The Oregon Trail	lost
March 17, 1923	The Midnight Guest	
March 19, 1923	The Phantom Fortune	lost
March 25, 1923	Single Handed	lost
April 2, 1923	Nobody's Bride	lost
April 9, 1923	Trimmed in Scarlet	lost
April 15, 1923	Abysmal Brute	lost
April 16, 1923	The Town Scandal	lost
April 23, 1923	Dead Game	
April 30, 1923	The Eagle's Talons	lost
May 6, 1923	What Wives Want	lost
May 7, 1923	Fools and Riches	lost
May 7, 1923	Bavu	lost
May 14, 1923	Crossed Wires	lost
May 21, 1923	Double Dealing	lost
May 27, 1923	Burning Words	lost
May 28, 1923	Trifling with Honor	trailer survives
June 4, 1923	Don Quickshot of the Rio Grande	
June 10, 1923	The Shock	
June 11, 1923	Railroaded	lost
June 25, 1923	Sawdust	lost
June 25, 1923	In the Days of Daniel Boone	trailer survives
June 28, 1923	Shootin' for Love	lost
July 1923	The Victor	lost
July 8, 1923	The Self-Made Wife	lost
July 9, 1923	McGuire of the Mounted	lost
July 23, 1923	Out of Luck	lost
July 30, 1923	Legally Dead	lost
August 13, 1923	The Love Brand	fragment
August 17, 1923	Blinky	lost
August 26, 1923	Drifting	
August 27, 1923	Shadows of the North	lost
August 27, 1923	The Steel Trail	fragment
September 3, 1923	Merry-Go-Round	
September 6, 1923	The Hunchback of Notre Dame	distribution only
September 10, 1923	The Untameable	
September 12, 1923	The Six-Fifty	lost
September 17, 1923	Where Is This West?	lost
September 17, 1923	A Chapter in Her Life	
September 24, 1923	The Clean Up	lost
October 1, 1923	Beasts of Paradise	lost
October 14, 1923	The Ramblin' Kid	
October 16, 1923	Men in the Raw	lost
October 22, 1923	The Wild Party	lost
October 26, 1923	A Million to Burn	lost
November 5, 1923	Thundering Dawn	trailer survives
November 7, 1923	Crooked Alley	
November 19, 1923	The Acquittal	
December 3, 1923	The Near Lady	lost
December 3, 1923	The Darling of New York	last reel survives
December 3, 1923	The Ghost City	lost
December 4, 1923	His Mystery Girl	
December 17, 1923	White Tiger	
December 17, 1923	The Red Warning	lost
December 31, 1923	Pure Grit	lost

== 1924 ==
Release date	Title	Notes
January 7, 1924	Hook and Ladder	lost
January 21, 1924	The Whispered Name	lost
January 28, 1924	The Man from Wyoming	lost
February 1924	Jack O'Clubs	lost
February 3, 1924	The Breathless Moment	lost
February 4, 1924	Sporting Youth	
February 25, 1924	Ride for Your Life	lost
March 1924	Fools Highway	lost
March 3, 1924	The Phantom Horseman	
March 10, 1924	Stolen Secrets	lost
March 10, 1924	The Fast Express	fragment
March 17, 1924	The Night Message	lost
March 23, 1924	The Storm Daughter	fragment
March 31, 1924	The Galloping Ace	lost
April 7, 1924	The Law Forbids	incomplete
April 7, 1924	The Dancing Cheat	incomplete
April 21, 1924	40-Horse Hawkins	lost
May 5, 1924	Riders Up	lost
May 12, 1924	Ridgeway of Montana	
May 19, 1924	The Dangerous Blonde	lost
May 26, 1924	The Fighting American	
June 9, 1924	Broadway or Bust	lost
June 16, 1924	The Back Trail	
June 16, 1924	The Iron Man	lost
June 22, 1924	Dark Stairways	lost
June 23, 1924	Fight and Win	lost
July 7, 1924	Young Ideas	
July 15, 1924	Behind the Curtain	
July 20, 1924	The Signal Tower	
July 31, 1924	The Gaiety Girl	lost
August 10, 1924	The Sawdust Trail	lost
August 10, 1924	Hit and Run	
August 17, 1924	The Reckless Age	
August 24, 1924	Fighting Fury	fragment
August 31, 1924	Wine	lost
September 7, 1924	Big Timber	lost
September 14, 1924	The Turmoil	
September 21, 1924	The Slanderers	lost
September 21, 1924	Wolves of the North	lost
September 28, 1924	The Family Secret	
October 10, 1924	The Western Wallop	lost
October 12, 1924	Butterfly	
October 14, 1924	The Measure of a Man	lost
October 19, 1924	Daring Chances	lost
October 26, 1924	The Fast Worker	
November 2, 1924	The Sunset Trail	lost
November 9, 1924	The Rose of Paris	
November 12, 1924	Secrets of the Night	
November 17, 1924	K – The Unknown	
November 23, 1924	The Riddle Rider	lost
November 30, 1924	The Ridin' Kid from Powder River	incomplete
December 7, 1924	Love and Glory	lost
December 14, 1924	The Tornado	

== 1925 ==
Release date	Title	Notes
January 4, 1925	The Sign of the Cactus	lost
January 18, 1925	Smouldering Fires	
January 25, 1925	The Hurricane Kid	
February 8, 1925	Flying Hoofs	
February 8, 1925	A Roaring Adventure	lost
February 22, 1925	Ridin' Pretty	
February 23, 1925	Oh Doctor!	
March 1, 1925	The Taming of the West	lost
March 1, 1925	The Mad Whirl	
March 8, 1925	The Saddle Hawk	lost
March 9, 1925	The Great Circus Mystery	lost
March 15, 1925	The Price of Pleasure	lost
March 22, 1925	Let 'er Buck	lost
March 29, 1925	Head Winds	
April 5, 1925	Straight Through	lost
April 12, 1925	Dangerous Innocence	lost
April 26, 1925	Fifth Avenue Models	Incomplete; One Reel Missing
April 29, 1925	Almost a Husband	
May 3, 1925	Up the Ladder	
May 10, 1925	The Burning Trail	lost
May 11, 1925	The Fighting Ranger	lost
May 24, 1925	Raffles, the Amateur Cracksman	
June 7, 1925	I'll Show You the Town	
June 14, 1925	Ridin' Thunder	lost
June 21, 1925	The Man in Blue	
June 28, 1925	The Meddler	lost
July 18, 1925	Don Dare Devil	lost
August 2, 1925	The Red Rider	lost
August 9, 1925	A Woman's Faith	
September 6, 1925	The Teaser	lost
September 6, 1925	The White Outlaw	
September 7, 1925	Siege	lost
September 13, 1925	California Straight Ahead	
September 20, 1925	The Outlaw's Daughter	lost
September 20, 1925	Spook Ranch	
October 4, 1925	The Circus Cyclone	lost
October 11, 1925	Lorraine of the Lions	
October 18, 1925	Peacock Feathers	Technicolor Sequences lost
October 18, 1925	Bustin' Thru	lost
October 19, 1925	Ace of Spades	lost
October 25, 1925	The Storm Breaker	
October 31, 1925	Hidden Loot	lost
November 1, 1925	The Calgary Stampede	
November 1, 1925	His People	
November 8, 1925	Daring Days	lost
November 15, 1925	Where Was I?	
November 22, 1925	The Home Maker	
November 25, 1925	The Phantom of the Opera	Technicolor Sequences; Extant; Sound (Part-Talkie) Version Released In 1930.
November 29, 1925	Sporting Life	
December 6, 1925	Two-Fisted Jones	lost
December 13, 1925	Stella Maris	
December 20, 1925	Triple Action	lost
December 20, 1925	The Scarlet Streak	lost
December 22, 1925	The Call of Courage	lost
December 27, 1925	The Goose Woman	

== 1926 ==
Release date	Title	Notes
January 3, 1926	The Little Giant	
January 10, 1926	Arizona Sweepstakes	Lost Film
January 24, 1926	Western Pluck	Lost Film
January 31, 1926	The Demon	Lost Film
February 7, 1926	Under Western Skies	Lost Film
February 8, 1926	What Happened to Jones	
February 14, 1926	The Desperate Game	Lost Film
February 21, 1926	The Beautiful Cheat	
February 21, 1926	The Winking Idol	Lost Film
February 26, 1926	The Cohens and Kellys	
February 28, 1926	Sky High Corral	Lost Film
March 7, 1926	A Six Shootin' Romance	Lost Film
March 14, 1926	Chip of the Flying U	
March 21, 1926	Blue Blazes	Lost Film
March 28, 1926	The Combat	
April 4, 1926	Watch Your Wife	
April 11, 1926	Rustlers' Ranch	Lost Film
April 18, 1926	Skinner's Dress Suit	
April 23, 1926	The Midnight Sun	
April 25, 1926	The Border Sheriff	
May 2, 1926	The Still Alarm	
May 2, 1926	Chasing Trouble	Lost Film
May 9, 1926	The Phantom Bullet	
May 15, 1926	The Set-Up	Lost Film
May 23, 1926	My Old Dutch	
May 30, 1926	Looking for Trouble	Lost Film
June 6, 1926	The Escape	Lost Film
June 13, 1926	The Love Thief	Lost Film
June 20, 1926	The Scrappin' Kid	Lost Film
June 27, 1926	Rolling Home	Lost Film
June 28, 1926	Strings of Steel	Lost Film
July 7, 1926	The Fighting Peacemaker	Lost Film
July 11, 1926	The Man in the Saddle	Lost Film
July 18, 1926	Bucking the Truth	Lost Film
July 25, 1926	The Terror	
August 7, 1926	Oh, Baby!	Lost Film
September 5, 1926	The Wild Horse Stampede	
September 5, 1926	Poker Faces	
September 12, 1926	The Flaming Frontier	Incomplete
September 12, 1926	The Mystery Club	Lost Film
September 12, 1926	The Marriage Clause	Incomplete
September 19, 1926	The Ridin' Rascal	Lost Film
September 26, 1926	The Texas Streak	
October 2, 1926	The Ice Flood	
October 3, 1926	The Yellow Back	
October 10, 1926	The Runaway Express	
October 10, 1926	Take It from Me	
October 17, 1926	Red Hot Leather	Incomplete
October 24, 1926	The Old Soak	
October 31, 1926	The Man from the West	Lost Film
November 7, 1926	Spangles	
November 14, 1926	The Buckaroo Kid	
November 21, 1926	Prowlers of the Night	Lost Film
November 24, 1926	Prisoners of the Storm	
December 5, 1926	Her Big Night	
December 12, 1926	Lazy Lightning	Lost Film
December 20, 1926	Butterflies in the Rain	Lost Film
December 26, 1926	The Whole Town's Talking	
December 26, 1926	The Stolen Ranch	

== 1927 ==
Release date	Title	Notes
January 2, 1927	The Silent Rider	Lost Film
January 9, 1927	Rough and Ready	Lost Film
January 13, 1927	The Cheerful Fraud	
January 17, 1927	The Fire Fighters	Lost Film
January 23, 1927	Loco Luck	Lost Film
January 30, 1927	A One Man Game	Lost Film
February 13, 1927	The Denver Dude	Lost Film
February 20, 1927	The Western Whirlwind	Lost Film
February 27, 1927	The Wrong Mr. Wright	Lost Film
March 6, 1927	Set Free	Lost Film
March 6, 1927	Perch of the Devil	Lost Film
March 20, 1927	Sensation Seekers	
March 20, 1927	The Fourth Commandment	
March 27, 1927	Blazing Days	
March 28, 1927	The Return of the Riddle Rider	Lost Film
April 1, 1927	Straight Shootin'	
April 3, 1927	Hey! Hey! Cowboy	Lost Film
April 10, 1927	The Rambling Ranger	Lost Film
April 10, 1927	Held by the Law	Lost Film
April 17, 1927	Red Clay	Lost Film
April 20, 1927	The Claw	
April 24, 1927	Taxi! Taxi!	
April 24, 1927	Hard Fists	incomplete
May 1, 1927	The Broncho Buster	Lost Film
May 8, 1927	The Love Thrill	Lost Film
May 15, 1927	The Prairie King	
May 22, 1927	Grinning Guns	Lost Film
May 23, 1927	Beware of Widows	Lost Film
May 29, 1927	Down the Stretch	
June 5, 1927	The Western Rover	Lost Film
June 5, 1927	Men of Daring	Lost Film
June 6, 1927	Whispering Smith Rides	Trailer Extant Only
June 12, 1927	Fast and Furious	
June 19, 1927	Hands Off	Lost Film
June 22, 1927	Alias the Deacon	
July 3, 1927	The Fighting Three	
July 10, 1927	A Hero on Horseback	
July 17, 1927	Spurs and Saddles	Lost Film
July 24, 1927	Range Courage	Lost Film
August 7, 1927	Painting the Town	
August 15, 1927	Blake of Scotland Yard	Lost Film
September 4, 1927	Three Miles Up	Lost Film
September 4, 1927	Out All Night	Lost Film
September 9, 1927	The Cat and The Canary	
September 18, 1927	The Lone Eagle	Lost Film
September 18, 1927	The Border Cavalier	Lost Film
September 25, 1927	Painted Ponies	Lost Film
October 1, 1927	A Man's Past	Lost Film
October 2, 1927	Wolf's Trail	
October 2, 1927	Silk Stockings	
October 21, 1927	The Irresistible Lover	Lost Film
October 23, 1927	The Chinese Parrot	Lost Film
October 23, 1927	Back to God's Country	
November 3, 1927	Surrender!	
November 4, 1927	Uncle Tom's Cabin	Synchronized Score; Extant; Universal's first sound feature.
November 6, 1927	The Small Bachelor	Lost Film
November 7, 1927	The Trail of the Tiger	Lost Film
November 13, 1927	The Thirteenth Juror	
November 20, 1927	One Glorious Scrap	Lost Film
November 20, 1927	Galloping Fury	Lost Film
November 27, 1927	Wild Beauty	
November 27, 1927	On Your Toes	Lost Film
December 4, 1927	Fangs of Destiny	
December 5, 1927	Cheating Cheaters	Fragment Extant Only
December 18, 1927	Desert Dust	Lost Film
December 18, 1927	A Hero for a Night	

== 1928 ==
Release date	Title	Notes
January 1, 1928	The Air Patrol	Lost Film
January 8, 1928	The Fourflusher	
January 15, 1928	The Fearless Rider	
January 15, 1928	The Cohens and the Kellys in Paris	
January 16, 1928	The Vanishing Rider	Lost Film
January 29, 1928	The Rawhide Kid	Lost Film
January 29, 1928	The Call of the Heart	Lost Film
February 5, 1928	That's My Daddy	
February 9, 1928	Love Me and the World Is Mine	
February 12, 1928	The Clean-Up Man	Lost Film
February 18, 1928	Finders Keepers	
February 19, 1928	The Shield of Honor	
February 26, 1928	The Phantom Flyer	
February 26, 1928	Midnight Rose	Lost Film
February 27, 1928	All Balled Up	
March 10, 1928	The Count of Ten	Lost Film
March 11, 1928	Stop That Man	Lost Film
March 11, 1928	Put 'Em Up	Lost Film
March 18, 1928	A Trick of Hearts	Lost Film
March 25, 1928	The Four-Footed Ranger	
March 26, 1928	Haunted Island	Trailer Extant Only
April 1, 1928	Thanks for the Buggy Ride	Lost Film
April 1, 1928	Honeymoon Flats	Lost Film
April 8, 1928	13 Washington Square	
April 8, 1928	Thunder Riders	
April 15, 1928	A Final Reckoning	Lost Film
April 27, 1928	Won in the Clouds	
April 29, 1928	Good Morning, Judge	
May 6, 1928	We Americans	Lost Film
May 6, 1928	The Arizona Cyclone	Lost Film
May 12, 1928	The Flyin' Cowboy	Lost Film
May 13, 1928	Hot Heels	Trailer Extant Only
May 20, 1928	The Wild West Show	Lost Film
May 20, 1928	The Hound of Silver Creek	Lost Film
June 1928	Phyllis of the Follies	Lost Film
June 3, 1928	Buck Privates	
June 3, 1928	A Made-To-Order Hero	
June 4, 1928	Hoofbeats of Vengeance	
June 20, 1928	Lonesome	Part-Talkie; Extant; Universal's first feature with dialogue.
June 23, 1928	The Foreign Legion	
July 9, 1928	The Grip of the Yukon	
July 15, 1928	Quick Triggers	
July 29, 1928	Greased Lightning	
August 19, 1928	Riding for Fame	Lost Film
September 2, 1928	Home, James	
September 9, 1928	Anybody Here Seen Kelly?	Lost Film
September 16, 1928	The Night Bird	
September 16, 1928	Guardians of the Wild	
September 30, 1928	The Cloud Dodger	
October 7, 1928	Clearing the Trail	Lost Film
October 10, 1928	Melody of Love	All-Talking; Incomplete; Universal's first All-Talking feature.
October 14, 1928	The Crimson Canyon	Lost Film
October 21, 1928	The Michigan Kid	
October 26, 1928	Burning the Wind	Lost Film
October 28, 1928	The Price of Fear	
October 28, 1928	Freedom of the Press	
October 29, 1928	Tarzan the Mighty	Lost Film
November 4, 1928	The Man Who Laughs	Synchronized Score; Extant
November 18, 1928	Jazz Mad	
November 18, 1928	The Danger Rider	Lost Film
November 18, 1928	Two Outlaws	
November 25, 1928	The Mystery Rider	Trailer Extant Only
December 2, 1928	Red Lips	Lost Film
December 9, 1928	The Gate Crasher	
December 16, 1928	Beauty and Bullets	
December 23, 1928	Give and Take	Part-Talkie; Lost Film
December 25, 1928	The Last Warning	Part-Talkie; Silent Version Extant

== 1929 ==
Release date	Title	Notes
January 6, 1929	King of the Rodeo	
January 13, 1929	The Sky Skidder	Lost Film
January 13, 1929	Man, Woman and Wife	Synchronized Score; Lost Film
January 20, 1929	Silks and Saddles	
January 27, 1929	Grit Wins	Lost Film
January 27, 1929	Red Hot Speed	Part-Talkie; Lost Film
February 3, 1929	Girl on the Barge	Part-Talkie; Lost Film
February 3, 1929	The Diamond Master	Lost Film
February 10, 1929	Wild Blood	
February 17, 1929	The Kid's Clever	Lost Film
February 24, 1929	Wolves of the City	Lost Film
March 3, 1929	Clear the Decks	Part-Talkie; Lost Film
March 10, 1929	The Shakedown	Part-Talkie; International Sound Version Extant
March 10, 1929	Born to the Saddle	Lost Film
March 17, 1929	The Cohens and the Kellys in Atlantic City	Part-Talkie; Extant
March 24, 1929	Slim Fingers	Lost Film
March 24, 1929	It Can Be Done	Part-Talkie; Lost Film
March 31, 1929	Smilin' Guns	Incomplete; Reels 1 to 3 Extant
April 10, 1929	Plunging Hoofs	Lost Film
April 14, 1929	The Charlatan	Part-Talkie; Silent Version Extant
April 27, 1929	Scandal	Part-Talkie; Lost Film
April 28, 1929	Eyes of the Underworld	
May 12, 1929	The Lariat Kid	Lost Film
May 19, 1929	The Border Wildcat	Lost Film
May 24, 1929	The Winged Horseman	Lost Film
May 27, 1929	Broadway	All-Talking; Technicolor Sequences; Extant
June 2, 1929	The Tip Off	Lost Film
June 2, 1929	His Lucky Day	Part-Talkie; Lost Film
June 30, 1929	The Smiling Terror	Lost Film
June 30, 1929	Come Across	Part-Talkie; Extant
July 7, 1929	College Love	All-Talking; Lost Film
July 8, 1929	The Pirate of Panama	Lost Film
July 14, 1929	The Body Punch	Lost Film
July 21, 1929	Modern Love	Part-Talkie; Extant
July 28, 1929	Girl Overboard	Part-Talkie; Lost Film
July 28, 1929	Show Boat (Note: Owned by Warner Bros. (via Turner Entertainment Co.))	distribution only; Part-Talkie; Extant
August 4, 1929	The Harvest of Hate	
August 4, 1929	The Love Trap	Part-Talkie; Extant
August 18, 1929	The Ridin' Demon	Lost Film
August 25, 1929	Points West	
September 1, 1929	The Drake Case	All-Talking; Silent Version Extant
September 8, 1929	The Wagon Master	Part-Talkie; Extant
September 15, 1929	Hold Your Man	All-Talking; Extant
September 22, 1929	Barnum Was Right	All-Talking; Silent Version Extant
September 29, 1929	Tonight at Twelve	All-Talking; Lost Film
September 30, 1929	The Ace of Scotland Yard	Part-Talkie; Lost Film
October 1929	Melody Lane	All-Talking; Incomplete
October 6, 1929	One Hysterical Night	All-Talking; Extant
October 16, 1929	Sea Fury	All-Talking; Lost Film
October 27, 1929	The Long, Long Trail	All-Talking; Extant
November 1929	The Last Performance	Part-Talkie; Silent Version Extant
November 3, 1929	The Mississippi Gambler	All-Talking; Extant
November 10, 1929	Señor Americano	All-Talking; Silent Version Extant
November 17, 1929	Shanghai Lady	All-Talking; Lost Film
November 24, 1929	Skinner Steps Out	All-Talking; Extant
November 24, 1929	The Devil's Pit	All-Talking; Lost Film
December 8, 1929	The Shannons of Broadway	All-Talking; Lost Film
December 9, 1929	Tarzan the Tiger	Synchronized Score; Extant
December 12, 1929	Hell's Heroes	distribution only; All-Talking; Extant
December 22, 1929	Courtin' Wildcats	Part-Talkie; Extant

== See also ==
- List of Focus Features films
- List of Universal Pictures theatrical animated feature films
- Universal Pictures
- Category:Lists of films by studio
