= Second Hand Rose =

Second Hand Rose may refer to:

- "Second Hand Rose" (song), 1921 song made popular by Fanny Brice and later associated with Barbra Streisand
- Second Hand Rose (band), Chinese rock band
- Second Hand Rose (film), 1922 American film directed by Lloyd Ingraham
