= Top of the Morning =

Top of the Morning may refer to:

- Top of the Morning (book), a 2013 non-fiction book about early-morning television by Brian Stelter
- Top o' the Morning (1922 film), a lost 1922 silent film romantic drama
- Top o' the Morning (1949 film), a 1949 American romantic comedy film
- Top o' the Morning, a recurring sketch in American TV show Saturday Night Live
- "The Top of the Morning", the eighth movement of Mike Oldfield's Tubular Bells III
