= Gladys Walton =

American silent film actress (1903–1993)

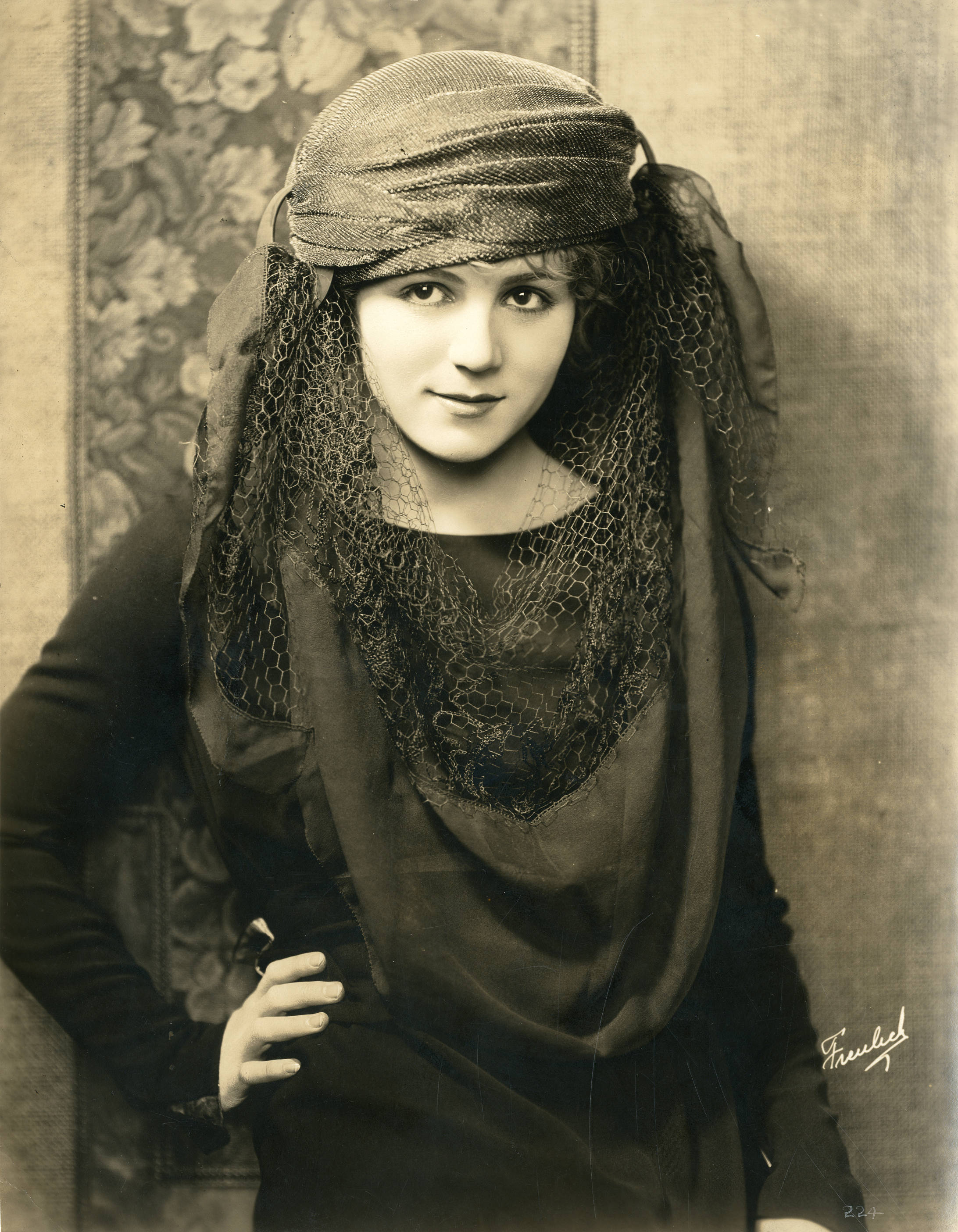
- Walton in 1922
- Born: April 13, 1903; Boston, Massachusetts, U.S.
- Died: November 15, 1993 (aged 90); Morro Bay, California, U.S.
- Resting place: Cayucos-Morro Bay District Cemetery; Cayucos, San Luis Obispo County, California, U.S.
- Occupation: Actress
- Years active: 1919–1925
- Spouses: Frank Liddell (m. 1923; div. 1923); Henry Merritt Herbel (m. 1923; div. 1947); Spiro (Samuel) Dilles (m. 1953; div. 1955); Kenneth James Wells (m. 1971; div. 1973)
- Children: 6

Gladys Walton (April 13, 1903 – November 15, 1993) was an American silent film actress.

== Early life ==
Gladys Walton was born in Boston, Massachusetts and educated in Portland, Oregon. She attended Lincoln High School and Jefferson High School there. During her high school years she was known for her acting and her swimming ability.

== Career ==
A screen test that Walton took while visiting her uncle in Hollywood led to her working in films. She debuted in films at the Fox Sunshine comedy studio's in 1919, doing small parts in their comedy short films. As her acting talent came more out into the open, she was given larger and more important roles in films, such as La La Lucille in 1920 with Universal Studios, as well as The Secret Gift, also in 1920. She was also given her first starring role in Pink Tights (1920), opposite film star Jack Perrin. She was a contract player for Universal from 1920 to 1923, completing 28 films and earning $600 a week at the peak of her career. After leaving Universal she went on to do a few independent films. Only five of her 38 films exist: Pink Tights from 1920, All Dolled Up from 1921, The Untameable and Sawdust both from 1923, and A Little Girl in a Big City, released in 1925.

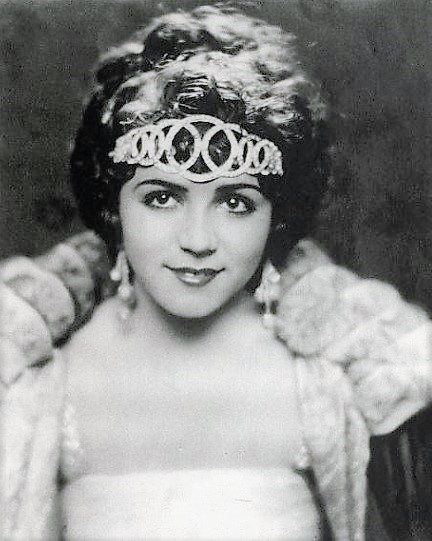
Walton in 1924.

Walton retired from acting in 1925. (Another source says, "The day she walked to the altar Gladys Walton gave up the movies," referring to her 1923 marriage.) She has been said to have done theater productions, but this is untrue. There were in fact two Gladys Waltons performing in the early 1920's. One was a theater actress on the East Coast, doing traveling stage productions, while the movie star Gladys was making films on the West Coast. Writers of the time often confused the two.

== Personal life ==
Walton married screenwriter Frank Liddell Jr. in 1920. They were divorced on June 9, 1923. Fewer than three weeks later she married Henry M. Herbel, with whom she had six children. She later married Spiro (Samuel) Dilles and Kenneth James Wells. All the marriages ended in divorce.

== Death ==
Walton died of cancer on November 15, 1993, aged 90.

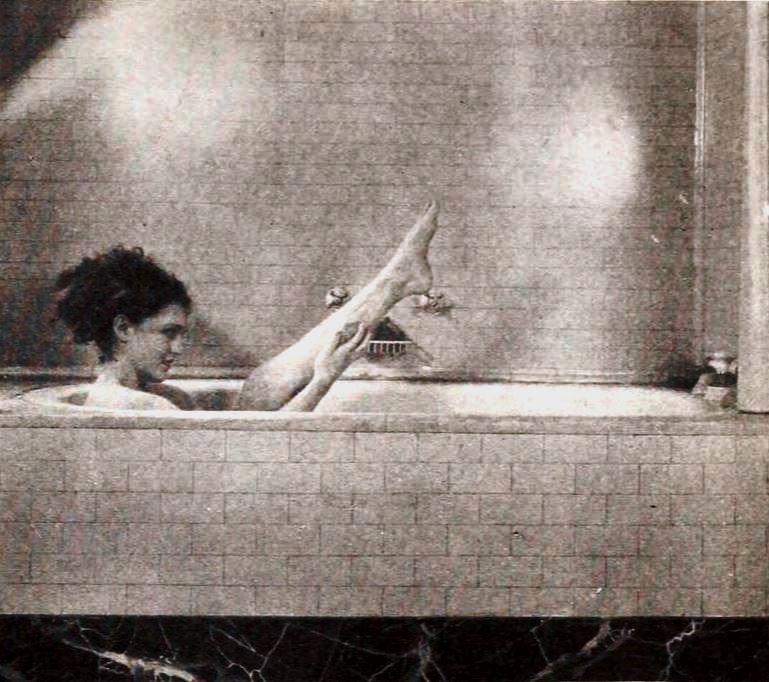
Walton in Rich Girl, Poor Girl (1921)

== Filmography ==
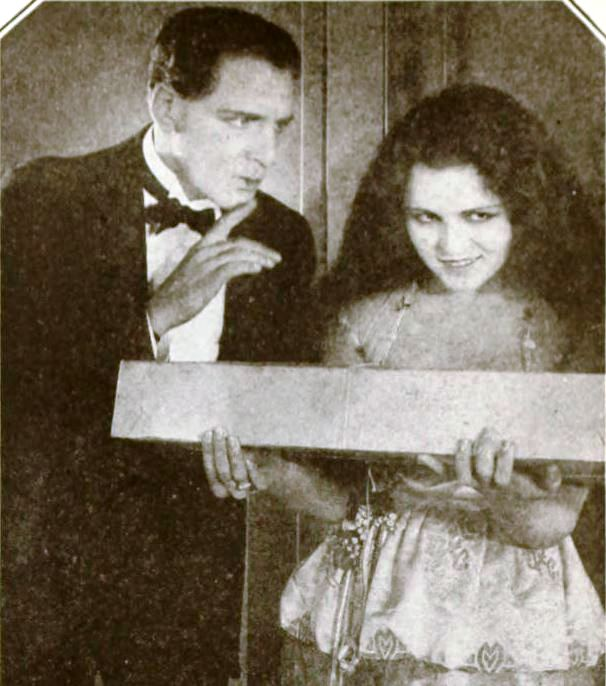
Gladys Walton in Risky Business (1920)

Lobby card for High Heels (1921)

Year	Title	Role	Notes
1908	The Fairylogue and Radio-Plays		Lost film
1920	La La Lucille	Peggy Hughes	Lost film
1920	The Secret Gift	Winnie	Lost film
1920	Pink Tights	Mazie Darton	
1920	Risky Business	Phillipa	Lost film
1921	Rich Girl, Poor Girl	Nora McShane / Beatrice Vanderfleet	Lost film
1921	All Dolled Up	Maggie Quick	
1921	Desperate Youth	Rosemary Merridew	Lost film
1921	The Man Tamer	The Lion Tamer	Lost film
1921	Short Skirts	Natalie Smith	Lost film
1921	The Rowdy	Kit Purcell	Lost film
1921	High Heels	Christine Trevor	Lost film
1921	Playing With Fire	Enid Gregory	Lost film
1922	The Guttersnipe	Mazie O'Day	Lost film
1922	The Wise Kid	Rosie Cooper	Lost film
1922	Second Hand Rose	Rose O'Grady	Lost film
1922	The Trouper	Mamie Judd	Lost film
1922	Top o' the Morning	'Jerry' O'Donnell	Lost film
1922	The Girl Who Ran Wild	M'liss	Lost film
1922	The Lavender Bath Lady	Mamie Conroy	Lost film
1922	A Dangerous Game	Gretchen Ann Peebles	Lost film
1923	The Love Letter	Mary Ann McKee	Lost film
1923	Gossip	Caroline Weatherbee	Lost film
1923	The Town Scandal	Jean Crosby	Lost film
1923	Crossed Wires	Marcel Murphy	Lost film
1923	Sawdust	Nita Moore	
1923	The Untameable	Edna Fielding / Joy Fielding	
1923	The Wild Party	Leslie Adams	Lost film
1923	The Near Lady	Nora Schultz	Lost film
1925	Easy Money		
1925	Enemies of Youth		Lost film
1925	The Sky Raider	Marie	Lost film
1925	Anything Once	Dorothy Nixon	Lost film
1925	A Little Girl in a Big City	Mary Barry	
1928	The Ape		Lost film
