= A Little Girl in a Big City =

1925 film directed by Burton L. King

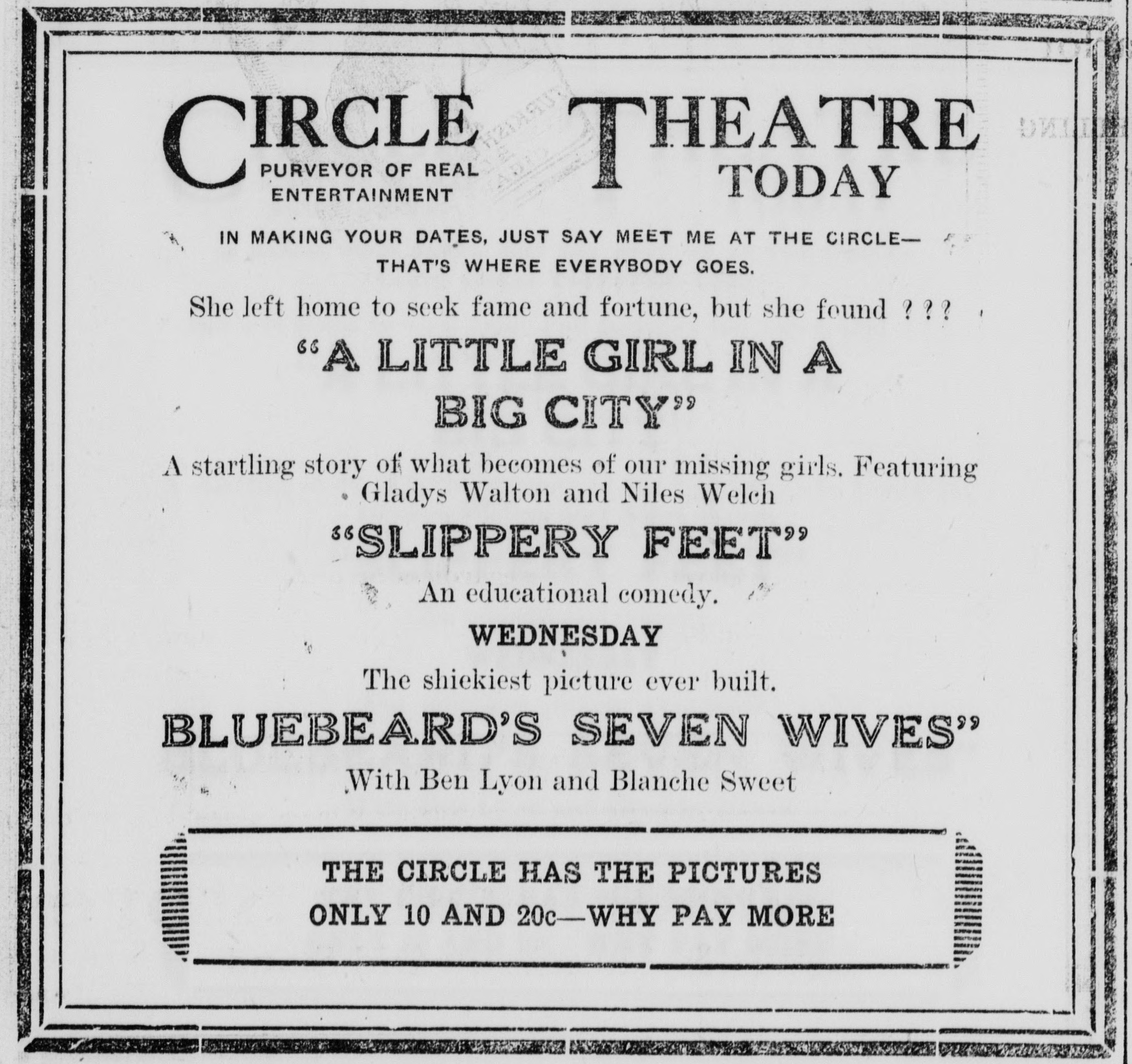
- A contemporary advertisement for the film and a few others
- Directed by: Burton L. King
- Screenplay by: Victoria Moore
- Based on: A Little Girl in a Big City (play) by James Kyrle MacCurdy
- Produced by: Gotham Productions
- Starring: Gladys Walton; Niles Welch
- Cinematography: Jack Young; C.J. Davis
- Distributed by: Lumas Film Corporation
- Release date: July 20, 1925
- Running time: 6 reels
- Country: United States
- Language: Silent (English intertitles)

A Little Girl in a Big City is a 1925 silent film drama directed by Burton L. King and starring Gladys Walton. It is based on an off-Broadway play, A Little Girl in a Big City, by James Kyrle MacCurdy. It was Gladys Walton's final film.

Several copies are preserved in positive and negative formats in the Library of Congress archive. A DVD of the film was released by Grapevine Video in 2012.

== Cast ==
- Gladys Walton – Mary Barry
- Niles Welch – Jack McGuire
- Mary Thurman – Mrs. Howard Young
- J. Barney Sherry – Howard Young
- Coit Albertson – D. V. Cortelyou
- Helen Shipman – Rose McGuire
- Sally Crute – Mrs. Barry
- Nellie Savage – Dolly Griffith
