= Anything Once (1925 film) =

Silent comedy film

Barb Wire
- Directed by: Justin H. McCloskey
- Written by: Harry Chandlee
- Story by: Nate H. Edwards
- Produced by: Harry Arras; Jack Weinberg
- Starring: Tully Marshall; Gladys Walton; Mathilde Brundage
- Cinematography: Charles Murphy
- Production company: Chessplay Pictures
- Distributed by: Aywon Film Corporation
- Release date: June 21, 1925
- Running time: 64 minutes
- Country: United States
- Language: Silent (English intertitles)

Anything Once is a 1925 American silent romantic comedy film directed by Justin H. McCloskey and starring Tully Marshall, Gladys Walton, and Mathilde Brundage.

== Plot ==
As described in a film magazine review, adventurer David Marvin meets Nixon, who sees in him the opportunity to rid his daughter Dorothy of a bogus Duke. The Duke, to bring disfavor on David, places some jewels on Marvin's person. Dorothy saves the situation.

== Cast ==
- Tully Marshall as Mr. Nixon
- Gladys Walton as Dorothy Nixon
- Harold Austin as David Marvin
- Mathilde Brundage as Mrs. Nixon
- Francis McDonald as Bogus Duke

== Bibliography ==
- Munden, Kenneth White. The American Film Institute Catalog of Motion Pictures Produced in the United States, Part 1. University of California Press, 1997. ISBN 978-0-520-20969-5.
