= The Sky Raider =

1925 film

- Film poster
- Directed by: T. Hayes Hunter
- Written by: Gerald C. Duffy
- Based on: "The Great Air Mail Robbery" by Jack Lait
- Produced by: Gilbert E. Gable
- Starring: Charles Nungesser; Jacqueline Logan; Gladys Walton
- Production companies: Encore Pictures; Arcadia Productions, Inc.
- Distributed by: Associated Exhibitors
- Release date: March 5, 1925 (premiere)
- Running time: 70 minutes
- Country: United States
- Language: Silent (English intertitles)

The Sky Raider is a 1925 American silent drama film directed by T. Hayes Hunter and starring Charles Nungesser, Jacqueline Logan and Gladys Walton. With the interest in the aviators of World War I, producer Gilbert E. Gable and Arcadia Productions, were able to showcase the talents of Nungesser, a genuine hero, who had 43 aerial victories, as the third-highest French ace. The Sky Raider was based on the short story, "The Great Air Mail Robbery" by Jack Lait.

== Plot ==
A mechanic with the French Air Force, Gregg Vanesse sabotages the aircraft of Capt. Charles Nungesser, France's "Flying Fiend", by stuffing the flying insignia from Paul Willard in the intake manifold. Paul is arrested, put on trial and sentenced to 20 years in a military prison.

Six years later, the Willards, a wealthy American family, arrive in France, searching for Paul, who had run away to war. Vanesse tells them that Paul died like a hero in the war. The Willards then meet Nungesser, who falls in love with Lucille, Paul's sister, and resolves to arrange for Paul's pardon.

Nungesser has Paul freed, and then goes to the United States to find Vanesse and discover the truth behind Paul's crime. When Nungesser discovers that Vanesse is planning to rob the air mail flight, with Paul's help, he captures Vanesse in a daring mid-air arrest and recovers the money.

Vanesse dies in an aircraft crash while Paul is cleared of all charges and marries his former sweetheart, Marie. Nungesser and Lucille also find true happiness.

== Cast ==
- Charles Nungesser as Captain Charles Nungesser
- Jacqueline Logan as Lucille Ward
- Gladys Walton as Marie
- Walter Miller as Paul Willard
- Lawford Davidson as Gregg Vanesse
- Theodore Babcock as Sen. Willard
- Ida Darling as Mrs. Willard
- Wilton Lackaye as Prison Commandant
- Edouard Durand as Forot

== Production ==
In 1924, Charles Nungesser had come to the United States as part of a barnstorming "flying circus". Arcadia Productions was quick to capitalize on his fame and signed him to star in The Sky Raider, which had scenes of air fighting in Europe as well as Nungesser thwarting an air mail robbery. Principal photography took place from December 1924 until mid-January 1925 at Glendale Studios, Long Island, New York.

Nungesser flew the Hanriot HD.1 he had brought over, and with his partner Louie Meier, also flew Thomas Morse S4Cs painted as German fighter aircraft. After the film's initial run, Nungesser sold the HD.1 to Jim Granger at Clover Field, California, who used it in local air shows.

== Reception ==
The Sky Raider was popular with audiences and featured the flamboyant Nungesser not only making personal appearances but he would stunt fly over the theaters where the film was shown. (Note: Aviation film historian Stephen Pendo described Nungesser's sense of flair at his appearance in the front lines, "sometimes dressed in a tuxedo and with a girl draped on his arm.") The film was shown extensively from 1927-1929, and after Nungesser on 8 May 1927 disappeared while attempting a transatlantic flight, was often being advertised as starring the "late flying ace."

== Censorship ==
Before the film could be exhibited in Kansas, the Kansas Board of Review required the elimination of a scene where Marie's husband kisses her on the neck and breast, and the shortening of a scene where she struggles against her husband.

== Preservation ==
With no prints of The Sky Raider located in any film archives, it is a lost film.
