= Herbert Blaché =

American film director (1882–1953)

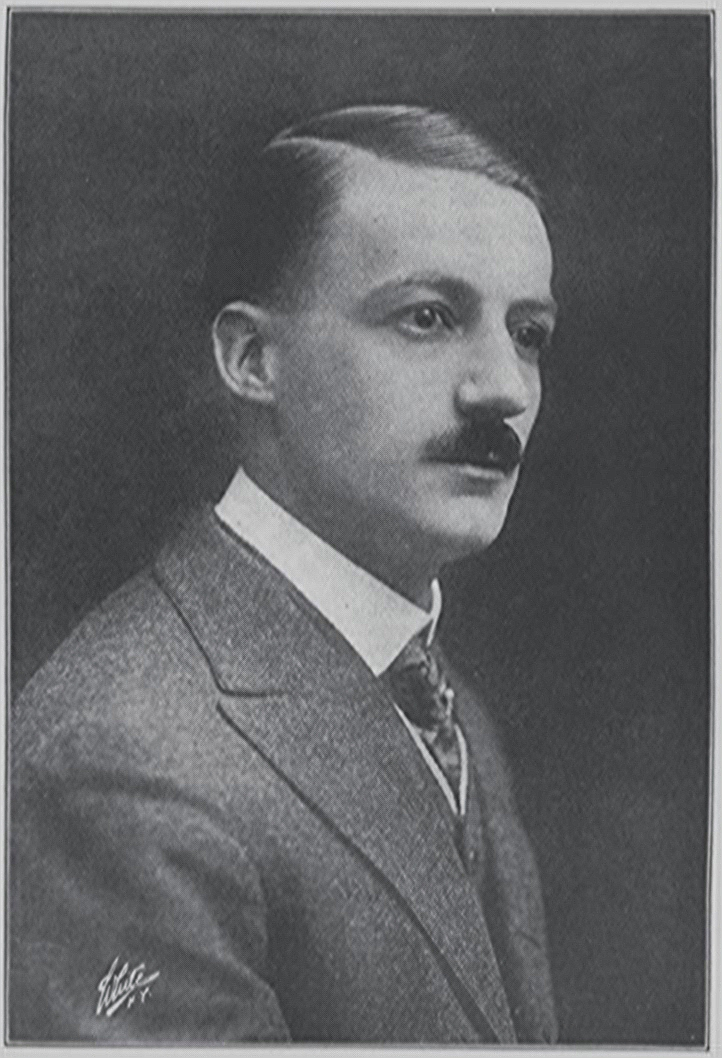
- Herbert Blaché
- Born: 5 October 1882; London, England
- Died: 23 October 1953 (aged 71); Santa Monica, California, U.S.
- Occupations: Film director, film producer, screenwriter
- Years active: 1912–1929
- Spouse: Alice Guy (m. 1907; div. 1922)
- Children: 2

Herbert Blaché (5 October 1882 – 23 October 1953), born Herbert Reginald Gaston Blaché-Bolton was a British-born American film director, producer and screenwriter, born of a French father. He directed more than 50 films between 1912 and 1929.

== Biography ==
Blaché was born in London, England. His father was a French hatmaker originally from Mont-de-Marsan, while his mother was an English actress, Elizabeth Bolton. In 1907 he married filmmaking pioneer Alice Guy, head of production with the French company Gaumont. Their marriage meant that Alice had to resign from her position working with Gaumont. Looking for new beginnings, the couple immigrated to New York where Herbert was soon appointed the production manager for Gaumont's operations in the United States. The two struck out on their own in 1910, partnering with George A. Magie in the formation of The Solax Company, the largest pre-Hollywood studio in America. With production facilities for their new company in Flushing, New York, Herbert served as production manager as well as cinematographer and Alice worked as the artistic director, directing many of its releases. Within two years they had become so successful that they were able to invest more than $100,000 into new and technologically advanced production facilities in Fort Lee, New Jersey, when many early film studios in America's first motion picture industry were based at the beginning of the 20th century.

To focus on writing and directing, in 1914 Alice made her husband the president of Solax. Shortly after taking the position Herbert started his own film company. For the next few years the couple maintained a personal and business partnership, working together on many projects, but with the decline of the East Coast film industry in favor of the more hospitable and cost-effective climate in Hollywood, their relationship also ended. In 1918 Herbert Blaché left his wife and children to pursue a career in Hollywood with one of his actresses. By 1922 they were officially divorced, prompting Alice to auction off her film studio while claiming bankruptcy. She returned to France the same year. Herbert directed his last film in 1929.

In 1951, during the mostly unfounded allegations of fears of widespread communist subversion by senator Joseph McCarthy, Blaché and his wife were among Hollywood figures listed by film writer Richard J. Collins as having at one time been members of the Communist Party. Blaché died in Santa Monica, California.

== Filmography ==
- Mireille (1906) (short) (cinematographer)
- Dublin Dan (1912) (short) (producer – uncredited)
- Hubby Does the Washing (1912) (short) (producer)
- Robin Hood (1912) (short)
- The Girl in the Arm-Chair (1912) (short) (producer)
- A Prisoner in the Harem (1913) (story)
- Kelly from the Emerald Isle (1913) (short) (writer)
- Shadows of a Great City (1913) (play)
- The Fight for Millions (1913) (producer)
- The Fortune Hunters (1913) (producer)
- The Star of India (1913) (producer)
- A Fight for Freedom; Or, Exiled to Siberia (1914) (producer)
- Fighting Death (1914)
- Hook and Hand (1914)
- The Burglar and the Lady (1914)
- The Million Dollar Robbery (1914) (supervising producer)
- The Mystery of Edwin Drood (1914)
- The Temptations of Satan (1914)
- The Chimes (1914)
- Barbara Frietchie (1915) (producer)
- Greater Love Hath No Man (1915)
- Her Own Way (1915)
- The Vampire (1915)
- My Madonna (1915) (producer)
- The Heart of a Painted Woman (1915) (producer)
- The Shadows of a Great City (1915) (writer)
- The Shooting of Dan McGrew (1915) (producer)
- The Song of the Wage Slave (1915) (writer, producer)
- A Woman's Fight (1916) (producer)
- The Girl with the Green Eyes (1916) (short) (producer)
- The Ocean Waif (1916) (short) (producer – uncredited)
- What Will People Say? (1916) (producer)
- A Man and the Woman (1917) (producer)
- Behind the Mask (1917) (presenter)
- The Auction of Virtue (1917) (producer)
- The Peddler (1917) (producer)
- Think It Over (1917) (writer, producer)
- The Adventurer (1917) (producer)
- A Man's World (1918) (director)
- Loaded Dice (1918) (producer)
- The Silent Woman (1918) (producer)
- Fools and Their Money (1919) (producer)
- Satan Junior (1919) (director)
- The Brat (1919) (producer)
- The Divorcee (1919) (producer)
- The Man Who Stayed at Home (1919) (producer)
- The Parisian Tigress (1919) (director)
- The Uplifters (1919) (director)
- Stronger Than Death (1920) (producer)
- Tarnished Reputations (1920) (producer)
- The Hope (1920) (producer)
- The New York Idea (1920) (producer)
- The Saphead (1920) (producer)
- The Walk-Offs (1920) (producer)
- Out of the Chorus (1921) (producer)
- The Bashful Suitor (1921) (short) (producer)
- The Beggar Maid (1921) (short) (producer)
- The Young Painter (1922) (short) (producer)
- Fools and Riches (1923) (producer)
- Nobody's Bride (1923) (producer)
- The Near Lady (1923) (producer)
- The Untameable (1923) (producer)
- The Wild Party (1923) (producer)
- High Speed (1924) (producer)
- Secrets of the Night (1924) (producer)
- Head Winds (1925) (producer)
- The Calgary Stampede (1925) (director)
- The Mystery Club (1926) (producer)
- Burning the Wind (1929) (producer)
