= The Untameable =

1923 film

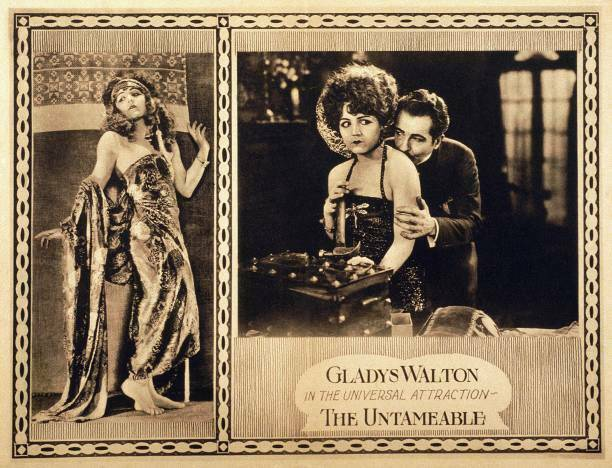
- Directed by: Herbert Blaché
- Written by: Hugh Hoffman
- Based on: The White Cat by Gelett Burgess
- Produced by: Carl Laemmle
- Starring: Gladys Walton; Malcolm McGregor; John St. Polis
- Cinematography: Benjamin H. Kline; Howard Oswald
- Production company: Universal Pictures
- Distributed by: Universal Pictures
- Release date: September 10, 1923
- Running time: 65 minutes
- Country: United States
- Language: Silent (English intertitles)

The Untameable is a 1923 American silent drama film directed by Herbert Blaché and starring Gladys Walton, Malcolm McGregor, and John St. Polis. It is based on the 1907 novel The White Cat by Gelett Burgess.

== Plot ==
As described in the film's copyright record, Engineer Chester Arnold becomes concerned that his fiancée Joy Fielding, who has a sweet and generous nature, is developing a split personality, often believing she is a mean and vampish woman called Edna. However, when in her good side, she still loves Chester, who does not understand the changes in his sweetheart, and finally seeks to find the truth of the matter. He discovers that she is being hypnotised by her physician Doctor Copin, who schemes to get his hands on her money. While under the evil influence of the unscrupulous doctor, Joy has been induced to marry him. Chester confronts the doctor, who laughs at him and tells him to mind his own business and to stop butting into other people's lives. They fight and the doctor's maid Ah Moy watches. When it looks to her that the doctor is going to win, she releases her mistress' hounds. They attack the doctor and wound him fatally. With the evil influence gone, Joy's good nature asserts itself and takes possession of her soul, and with Chester her life is as before.

== Cast ==
- Gladys Walton as Edna Fielding/Joy Fielding
- Malcolm McGregor as Chester Arnold
- John St. Polis as Dr. Copin
- Etta Lee as Ah Moy
- George F. Marion as Old Man at car accident (uncredited)
- Lon Poff in a bit part (uncredited)

== Preservation ==
A print of the film has been released on DVD.

== Bibliography ==
- Connelly, Robert B. The Silents: Silent Feature Films, 1910-36, Volume 40, Issue 2. December Press, 1998.
- Munden, Kenneth White. The American Film Institute Catalog of Motion Pictures Produced in the United States, Part 1. University of California Press, 1997.
