= The Rowdy =

1921 film

- Directed by: David Kirkland
- Written by: Jack Cunningham; Doris Schroeder
- Based on: The Ark Angel by Hamilton Thompson
- Produced by: Carl Laemmle
- Starring: Rex De Rosselli; Anna Dodge; Gladys Walton
- Cinematography: Earl M. Ellis
- Production company: Universal Pictures
- Distributed by: Universal Pictures
- Release date: September 19, 1921
- Running time: 50 minutes
- Country: United States
- Languages: Silent; English intertitles

The Rowdy is a 1921 American silent drama film directed by David Kirkland and starring Rex De Rosselli, Anna Dodge and Gladys Walton.

== Cast ==
- Rex De Rosselli as Capt. Dan Purcell
- Anna Dodge as Mrs. Purcell
- Gladys Walton as Kit Purcell
- Charles Murphy as Pete Curry
- Jack Mower as Burt Kincaid
- Frances Hatton as Mrs. Curry
- Bert Roach as Howard Morse
- Alida B. Jones as Beatrice Hampton
- Countess Du Cello as Clarissa Hampton
- Barbara Maier as Little Girl

== Bibliography ==
- Connelly, Robert B. The Silents: Silent Feature Films, 1910-36, Volume 40, Issue 2. December Press, 1998.
- Munden, Kenneth White. The American Film Institute Catalog of Motion Pictures Produced in the United States, Part 1. University of California Press, 1997.
