= The Near Lady =

1923 film

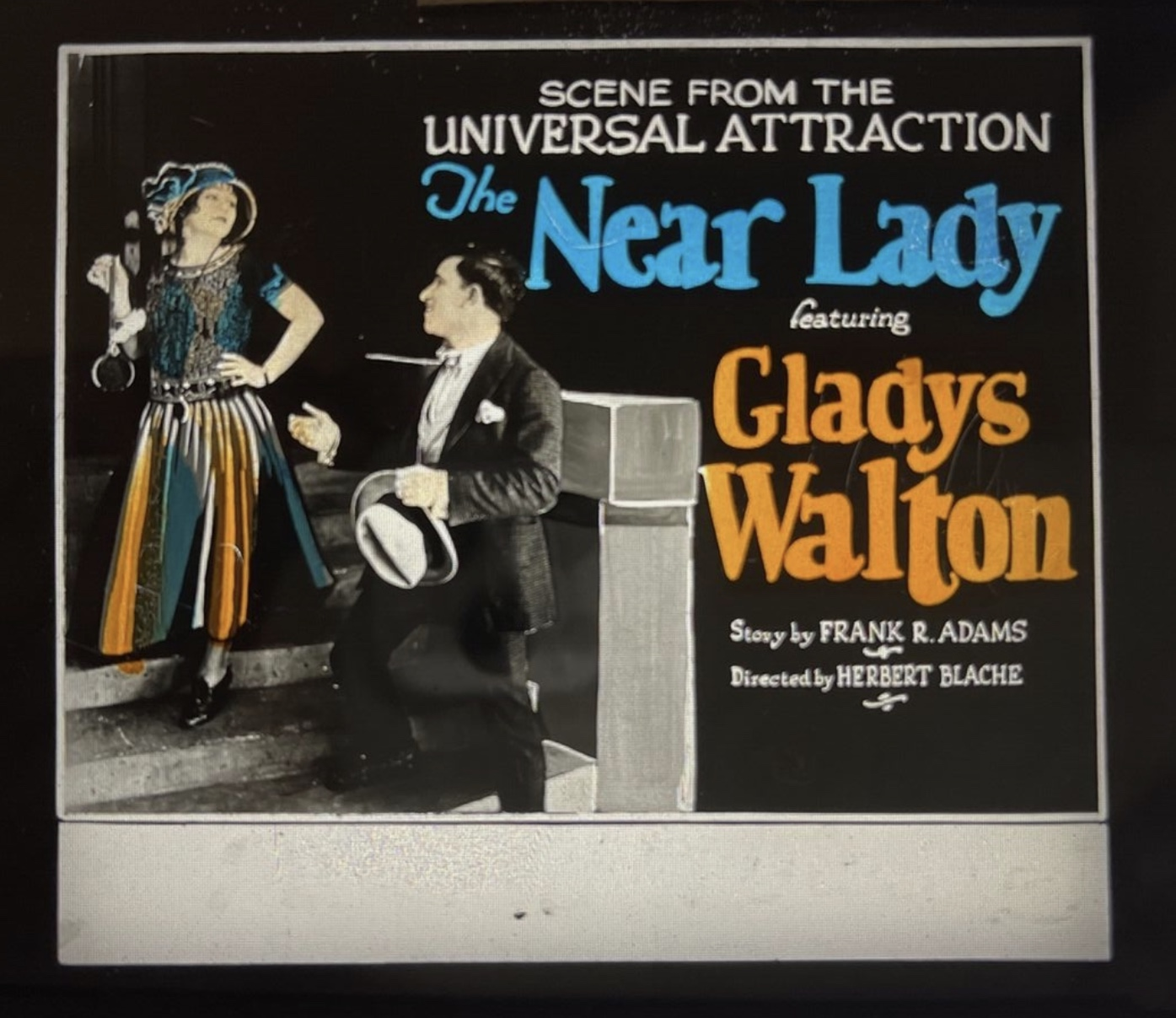
- Directed by: Herbert Blaché
- Screenplay by: Hugh Hoffman
- Story by: Frank R. Adams
- Starring: Gladys Walton; Jerry Gendron; Hank Mann; Kate Price; Otis Harlan; Florence Drew
- Cinematography: William Thornley
- Production company: Universal Pictures
- Distributed by: Universal Pictures
- Release date: December 3, 1923
- Running time: 50 minutes
- Country: United States
- Language: Silent (English intertitles)

The Near Lady is a 1923 American silent comedy film directed by Herbert Blaché and written by Hugh Hoffman. The film stars Gladys Walton, Jerry Gendron, Hank Mann, Kate Price, Otis Harlan, and Florence Drew. The film was released on December 3, 1923, by Universal Pictures.

== Plot ==
As described in a film magazine review, butcher Herman Schultz invents a sausage machine, becomes wealthy, and proposes to break into society with his family. His daughter Nora is selected to marry Basil Van Bibber, whose aristocratic folks have lost their money. They become engaged to please their parents, and then each falls in love with the other but tries to hide it. Basil attempts to disgust Nora by pretending to be drunk, but she sticks with him despite a family row and police threats. Finally, they admit their mutual love and are wed.

== Cast ==
- Gladys Walton as Nora Schultz
- Jerry Gendron as Basil Van Bibber
- Hank Mann as Lodger
- Kate Price as Bridget Schultz
- Otis Harlan as Herman Schultz
- Florence Drew as Aunt Maggie Mahaffey
- Emmett King as Stuyvesant Van Bibber
- Henrietta Floyd as Mrs. S. Van Bibber
