= High Heels (1921 film) =

1921 film

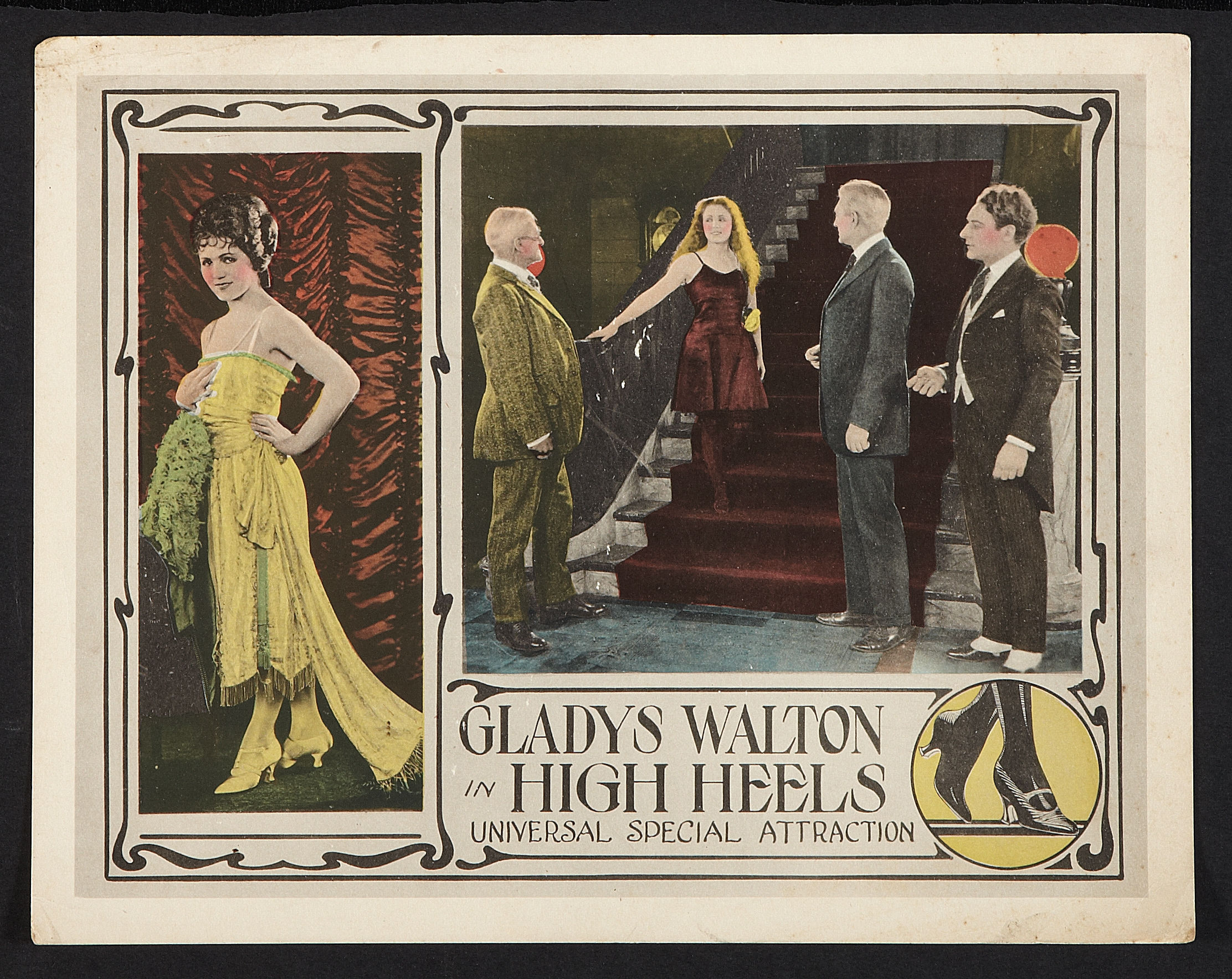
- Directed by: Lee Kohlmar
- Written by: Louise B. Clancy; Wallace Clifton
- Produced by: Carl Laemmle
- Starring: Gladys Walton; Frederik Vogeding; William Worthington
- Cinematography: Earl M. Ellis
- Production company: Universal Pictures
- Distributed by: Universal Pictures
- Release date: October 24, 1921
- Running time: 50 minutes
- Country: United States
- Languages: Silent; English intertitles

High Heels is a 1921 American silent drama film directed by Lee Kohlmar and starring Gladys Walton, Frederik Vogeding and William Worthington.

== Cast ==
- Gladys Walton as Christine Trevor
- Frederik Vogeding as Dr. Paul Denton
- William Worthington as Joshua Barton
- Freeman Wood as Cortland Van Ness
- George Hackathorne as Laurie Trevor
- Charles De Briac as Daffy Trevor
- Raymond De Briac as Dilly Trevor
- Milton Markwell as Douglas Barton
- T.D. Crittenden as John Trevor
- Robert Dunbar as Robert Graves
- Olah Norman as Amelia
- Leigh Wyant as Jennie Chubb
- Hugh Saxon as Mike (butler)
- Jean De Briac as Armand

== Bibliography ==
- Connelly, Robert B. The Silents: Silent Feature Films, 1910-36, Volume 40, Issue 2. December Press, 1998.
- Munden, Kenneth White. The American Film Institute Catalog of Motion Pictures Produced in the United States, Part 1. University of California Press, 1997.
