= A. P. Younger =

American screenwriter

A.P. Younger
- Born: September 25, 1890; Sacramento, California, US
- Died: November 29, 1931 (aged 41); Los Angeles, California, US
- Years active: 1919–1931

A.P. Younger; born Andrew Percival Younger (September 25, 1890 – November 29, 1931) was an American screenwriter active during the silent era and early sound period. He worked for Universal Pictures on a number of productions, and also wrote for other studios including Tiffany and Metro.

He was born in Sacramento, California, and he wrote for 60 films between 1919 and 1931. Younger shot himself to death by accident on November 29, 1931, at his private residence at 145 Beachwood Drive in Windsor Square, Los Angeles, California.

== Selected filmography ==
- Fair and Warmer (1919)
- Are All Men Alike? (1920)
- Dangerous to Men (1920)
- The Misfit Wife (1920)
- The Kiss (1921)
- Moonlight Follies (1921)
- Desperate Youth (1921)
- All Dolled Up (1921)
- The Man Tamer (1921)
- Rich Girl, Poor Girl (1921)
- The Galloping Kid (1922) (scenario)
- The Lone Hand (1922)
- The Flirt (1922)
- The Trouper (1922)
- The Abysmal Brute (1923)
- Drifting (1923)
- Why Men Leave Home (1924)
- The Torrent (1924)
- Adventure (1925)
- Souls for Sables (1925)
- Under the Rouge (1925)
- Morals for Men (1925)
- College Days (1926)
- The Midnight Sun (1926)
- The Beautiful Cheat (1926)
- Brown of Harvard (1926) (scenario)
- Slide, Kelly, Slide (1927) (scenario)
- Forbidden Hours (1928)
- While the City Sleeps (1928) (scenario)
- Sally (1929) (uncredited scenario)
- The Girl Said No (1930) (story)
- Sunny Skies (1930) (story)
- The Single Sin (1931)
