= Sawdust (film) =

1923 film

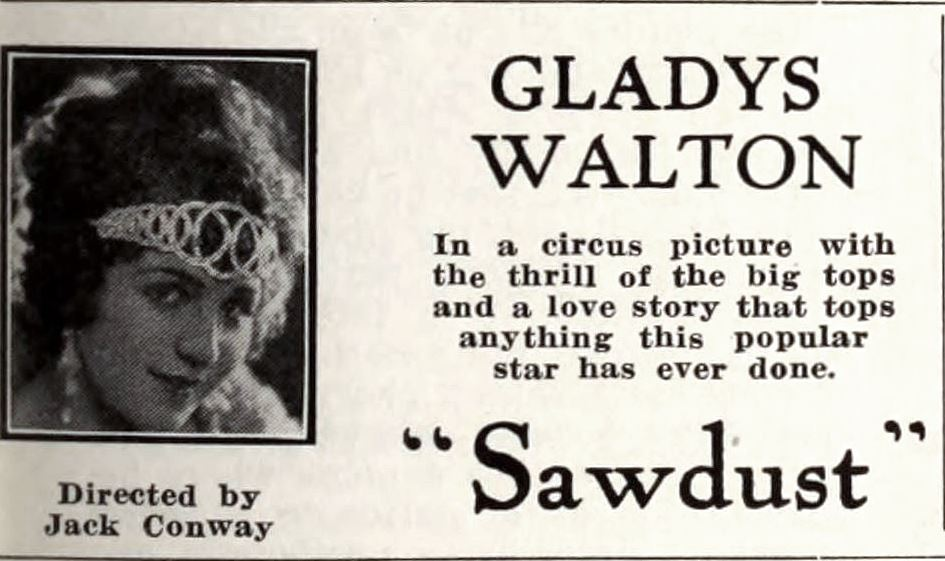
- Advertisement
- Directed by: Jack Conway
- Written by: Harvey Gates; Doris Schroeder
- Story by: Courtney Ryley Cooper
- Produced by: Carl Laemmle
- Starring: Gladys Walton; Niles Welch; Herbert Standing
- Cinematography: Allen M. Davey
- Production company: Universal Pictures
- Distributed by: Universal Pictures
- Release date: June 25, 1923
- Running time: 5 reels
- Country: United States
- Language: Silent (English intertitles)

Sawdust is a 1923 American silent drama film directed by Jack Conway and starring Gladys Walton, Niles Welch, and Herbert Standing. A print of Sawdust exists.

== Cast ==
- Gladys Walton as Nita Moore
- Niles Welch as Phillip Lessoway
- Edith Murgatroyd as Mrs. Nancy Wentworth
- Herbert Standing as Ethelbert Wentworth
- Matthew Betz as Runner Bayne
- Frank Brownlee as 'Pop' Gifford
- William Robert Daly as 'Speck' Dawson
- Mattie Peters as Tressie

== Bibliography ==
- James Robert Parish & Michael R. Pitts. Film directors: a guide to their American films. Scarecrow Press, 1974.
