= The Wild Party (1923 film) =

1923 film by Herbert Blaché

Sacred Silence
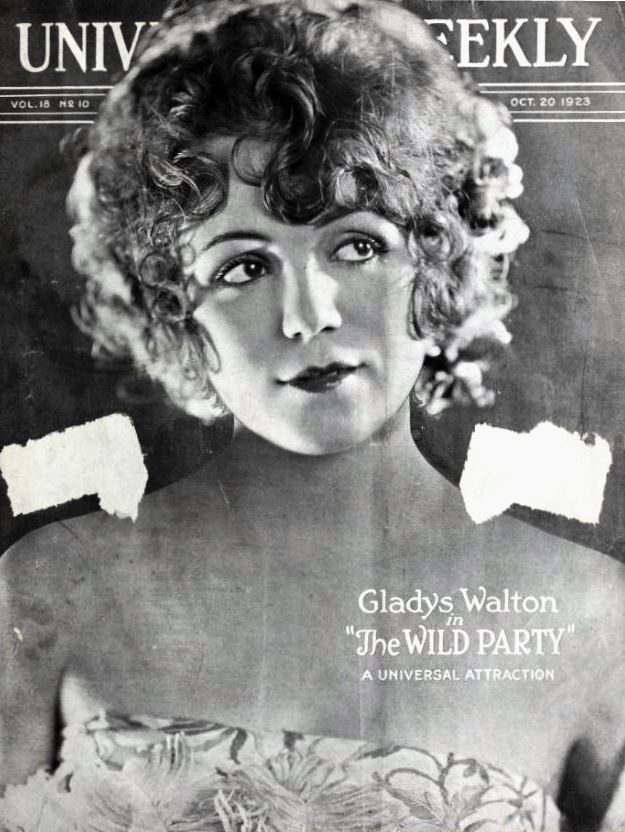
- Cover of Universal Weekly
- Directed by: Herbert Blaché
- Written by: Hugh Hoffman
- Story by: Marion Orth
- Produced by: Carl Laemmle
- Starring: Gladys Walton
- Cinematography: Clyde De Vinna
- Distributed by: Universal Pictures
- Release date: October 22, 1923
- Running time: 5 reels
- Country: United States
- Language: Silent (English intertitles)

The Wild Party is a lost 1923 American silent drama film directed by Herbert Blaché and starring Gladys Walton and Robert Ellis.

== Plot summary ==
The secretary to the city editor of a newspaper, Leslie Adams, persuades him to let her write up a society affair. Her efforts result in a libel suit against the paper, and Leslie is told to prove her story or join the ranks of the unemployed. She fails to prove that she was right, though coincidentally, she wins the love of Stuart Furth, the man who threatened the libel suit.

== Cast ==
- Gladys Walton as Leslie Adams
- Robert Ellis as Basil Wingate / Stuart Furth
- Freeman Wood as Jack Cummings
- Dorothy Revier as Blanche Cartwright
- Sidney De Gray as Paul Cartwright (credited as Sidney De Grey)
- Lewis Sargent as 'Scissors' Hogan
- Esther Ralston as Bess Furth
- Kate Lester as Mrs. Furth
- Joseph W. Girard as Mr. Furth
- Sidney Bracey as Jasper Johnston
- William Robert Daly

== Preservation ==
With no prints of The Wild Party located in any film archives, it is considered a lost film.
