= Second Hand Rose (film) =

1922 film

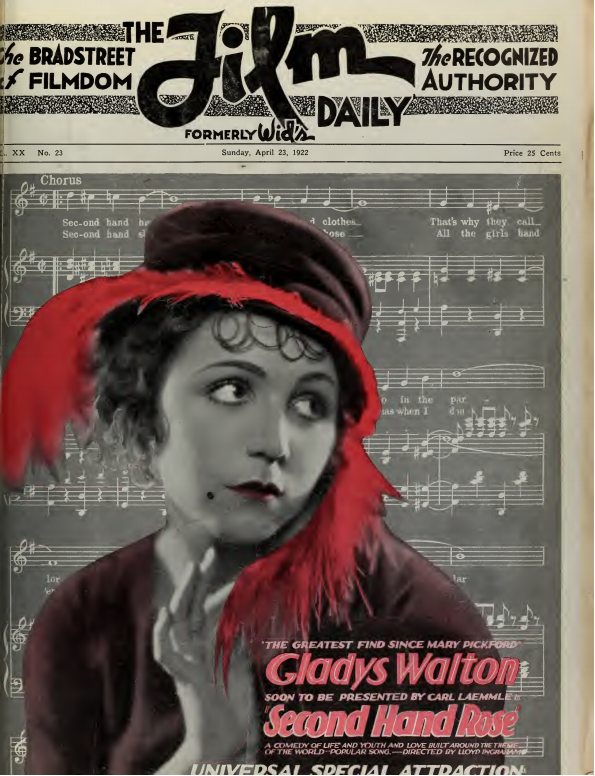
- Gladys Walton as Rose on the cover of Film Daily
- Directed by: Lloyd Ingraham
- Screenplay by: A. P. Younger
- Starring: Gladys Walton; George B. Williams; A. Edward Sutherland; Wade Boteler; Max Davidson; Virginia Adair
- Cinematography: Bert Cann
- Production company: Universal Film Manufacturing Company
- Distributed by: Universal Film Manufacturing Company
- Release date: May 8, 1922
- Running time: 50 minutes
- Country: United States
- Language: Silent (English intertitles)

Second Hand Rose is a 1922 American drama film directed by Lloyd Ingraham and written by A. P. Younger. The film stars Gladys Walton, George B. Williams, A. Edward Sutherland, Wade Boteler, Max Davidson, and Virginia Adair. The film was released on May 8, 1922, by Universal Film Manufacturing Company.

== Plot ==
As described in a film magazine, Rose O'Grady, an Irish waif, is adopted by kindhearted Hebrew pawnbroker Isaac Rosenstein, and, when Mama Rosenstein dies, Rose assumes the duties of housekeeper. Son Nat Rosenstein, employed in a silk factory, is robbed of some waybills and is sentenced to jail. He is released from jail through the political influence of Tim McCarthy, who wants to marry Rose. Nat aids the police in catching other crooks, and Rose confesses her love for Terry O'Brien, who takes Rose away from the secondhand store and secondhand family.

== Cast ==
- Gladys Walton as Rose O'Grady
- George B. Williams as Isaac Rosenstein
- A. Edward Sutherland as Nat Rosenstein
- Wade Boteler as Frankie 'Bull' Thompson
- Max Davidson as Abe Rosenstein
- Virginia Adair as Rebecca Rosenstein
- Alice Belcher as Rachel Rosenstein
- Jack Dougherty as Terry O'Brien
- Walter Perry as Tim McCarthy
- Bennett Southard as Hawkins
- Camilla Clark as Little Rosie
- Marion Feducha as Little Nat
