= The Wise Kid =

1922 film

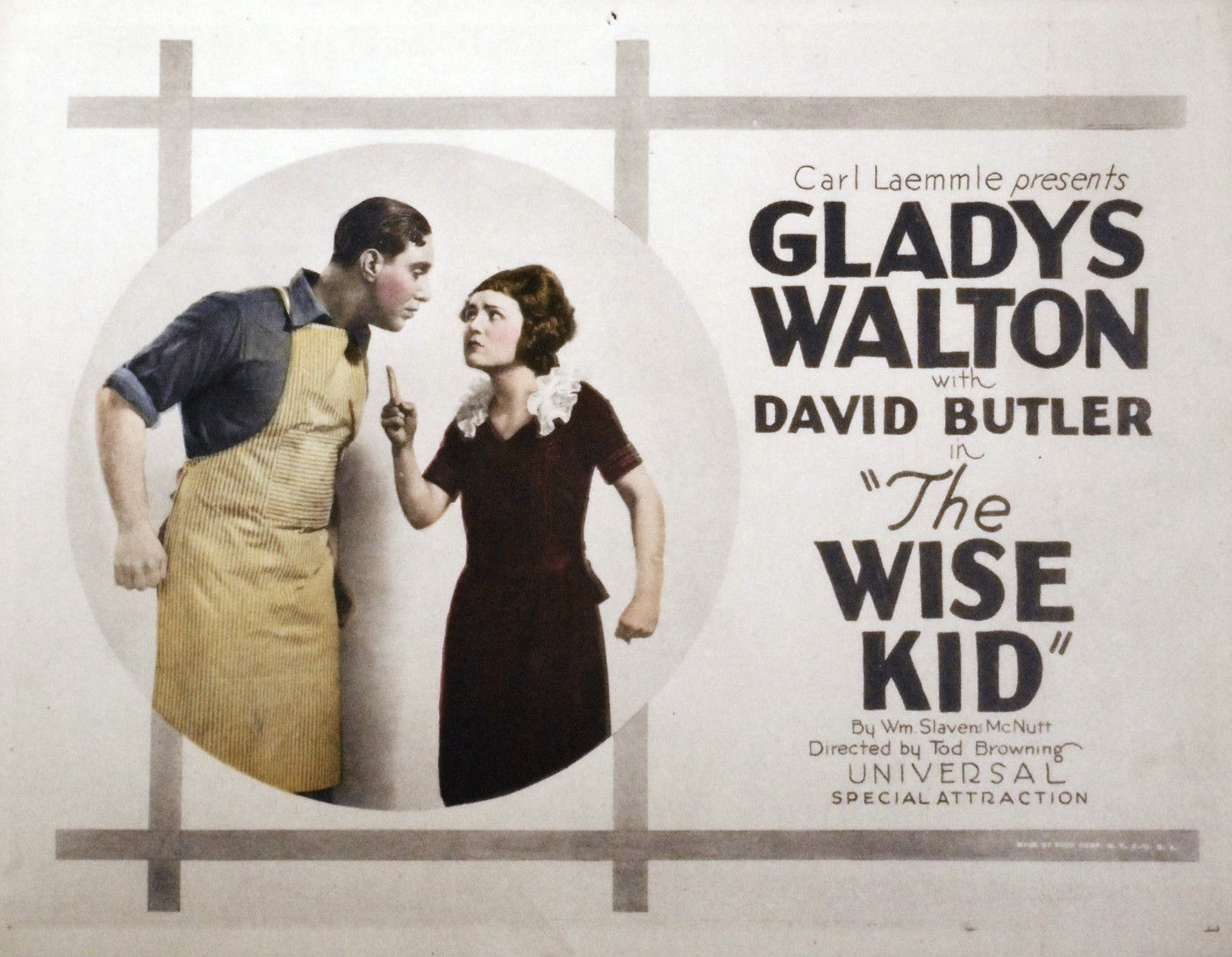
- Lobby card
- Directed by: Tod Browning
- Written by: Wallace C. Clifton
- Story by: William Slavens McNutt
- Starring: Gladys Walton; David Butler
- Cinematography: William Fildew
- Distributed by: Universal Film Manufacturing Company
- Release date: March 4, 1922
- Running time: 5 reels
- Country: United States
- Language: Silent (English intertitles)

The Wise Kid is a lost 1922 American silent comedy film directed by Tod Browning.

== Plot ==
As described in a film magazine, restaurant cashier Rosie Cooper is in love with bakery worker Freddie Smith, but when she helps out customer Jefferson Southwick, who has forgotten his pocketbook, Jimmie becomes jealous. Southwick poses as the son of a wealthy merchant, but when they discover his accounts are short, he borrows one hundred dollars from Rosie and then attempts to skip town. She is too smart for him, though, and he lands in jail. Rosie gets her money back and is content with the attentions of Freddie, who is honest even if he is poor.

== Cast ==
- Gladys Walton as Rosie Cooper
- David Butler as Freddie Smith
- Hallam Cooley as Harry
- Hector Sarno as Tony Rossi
- Henry A. Barrows as Jefferson Southwick

== See also ==
- List of lost films
