= All Dolled Up =

1921 film

- Directed by: Rollin S. Sturgeon
- Written by: John Colton (story); Andrew Percival Younger
- Starring: Gladys Walton; Edward Hearn; Florence Turner
- Cinematography: Alfred Gosden
- Production company: Universal Pictures
- Distributed by: Universal Pictures
- Release date: March 1921
- Running time: 50 minutes
- Country: United States
- Languages: Silent; English intertitles

All Dolled Up is a surviving 1921 American silent comedy film directed by Rollin S. Sturgeon and starring Gladys Walton, Edward Hearn and Florence Turner.

== Cast ==
- Gladys Walton as Maggie Quick
- Edward Hearn as James Montgomery Johnson
- Richard Norton as Percy Prack
- Florence Turner as Eva Bundy
- Helen Broneau as The Widow
- Fred Malatesta as Amilo Rodolpho
- Ruth Royce as Mademoiselle Scarpa
- John Goff as Eddie Bowman
- Frank Norcross as Mr. Shankley
- Muriel Godfrey Turner as Madame De Jercasse
- Lydia Yeamans as Landlady

== Bibliography ==
- Munden, Kenneth White. The American Film Institute Catalog of Motion Pictures Produced in the United States, Part 1. University of California Press, 1997.
