= Head Winds =

1925 film

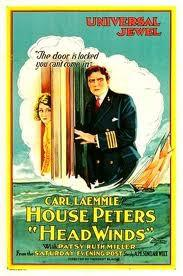
- Theatrical release poster
- Directed by: Herbert Blaché
- Written by: Edward T. Lowe Jr.
- Based on: Head Winds by A. M. Sinclair Wilt
- Produced by: Carl Laemmle
- Starring: House Peters; Patsy Ruth Miller
- Cinematography: John Stumar
- Distributed by: Universal Pictures
- Release date: March 29, 1925
- Running time: 52 minutes
- Country: United States
- Language: Silent (English intertitles)

Head Winds is a surviving 1925 American silent drama film directed by Herbert Blaché and starring House Peters and Patsy Ruth Miller. It was produced and distributed by Universal Pictures.

== Cast ==
- House Peters as Peter Rosslyn
- Patsy Ruth Miller as Patricia Van Felt
- Richard Travers as John Templeton Arnold
- Arthur Hoyt as Winthrop Van Felt
- William Austin as Theodore Van Felt
- William Conklin as Rev. Dr. Neal
- Lydia Yeamans Titus as Nurse
- George Kuwa as Wai Sai
- Togo Yamamoto as Woo Lang
- K. Nambu as Foo

== Preservation ==
Prints of Head Winds exist in the George Eastman Museum Motion Picture Collection and UCLA Film & Television Archive.
