= The Man Tamer =

1921 film

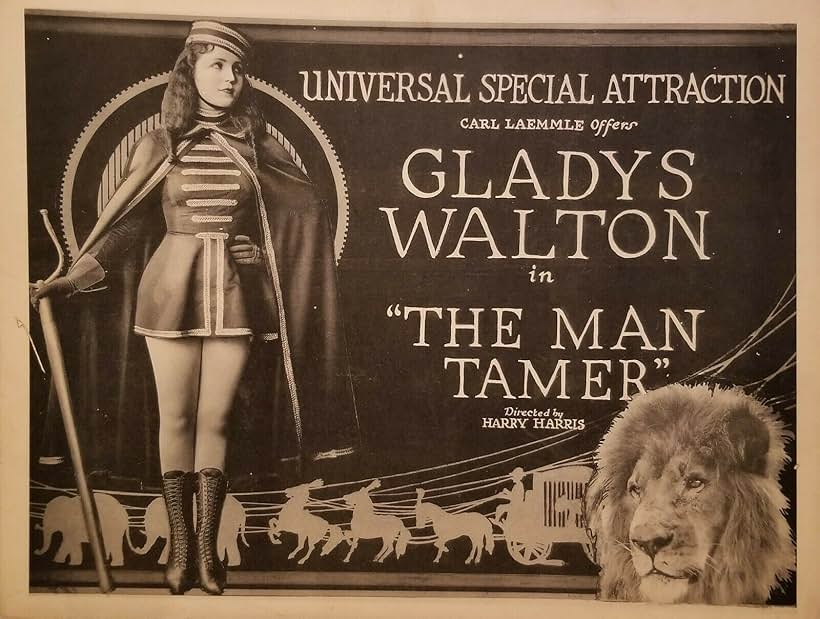
- Directed by: Harry B. Harris
- Screenplay by: A. P. Younger
- Based on: The Man-Tamer by John Barton Oxford
- Starring: Gladys Walton; Rex De Rosselli; William Welsh; Charles Murphy; J. Parker McConnell; Roscoe Karns
- Cinematography: Earl M. Ellis
- Production company: Universal Film Manufacturing Company
- Distributed by: Universal Film Manufacturing Company
- Release date: May 30, 1921
- Running time: 50 minutes
- Country: United States
- Language: English

The Man Tamer is a 1921 American drama film directed by Harry B. Harris and written by A. P. Younger. The film stars Gladys Walton, Rex De Rosselli, William Welsh, Charles Murphy, J. Parker McConnell and Roscoe Karns. The film was released on May 30, 1921, by Universal Film Manufacturing Company.

== Cast ==
- Gladys Walton as Kitty Horrigan
- Rex De Rosselli as Jim Horrigan
- William Welsh as Hayden Delmar
- Charles Murphy as Tim Murphy
- J. Parker McConnell as Charlie Parrish
- Roscoe Karns as Bradley P. Caldwell Jr.
- C. Norman Hammond as Bradley P. Caldwell Sr.
