= Desperate Youth =

1921 film

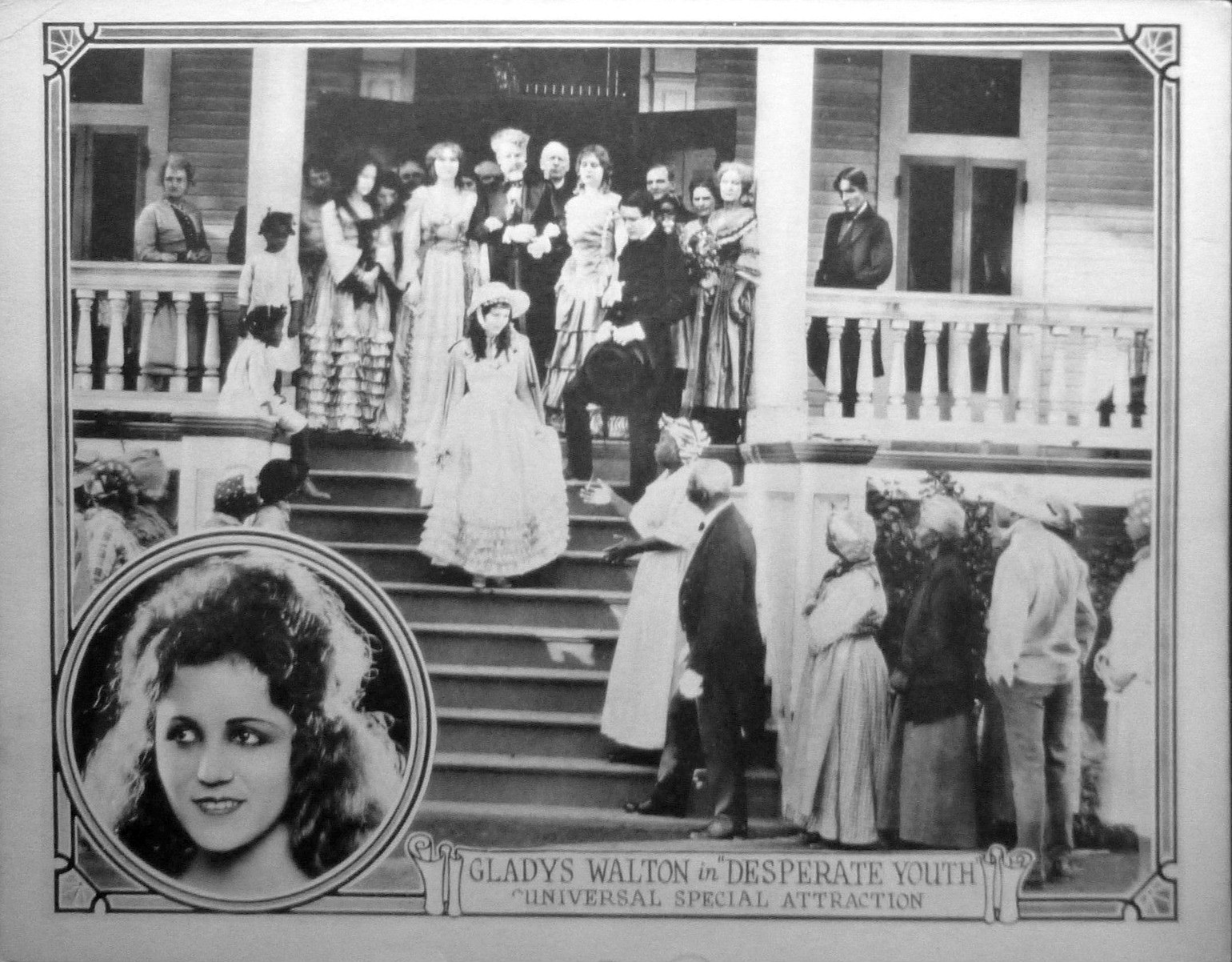
- Directed by: Harry B. Harris
- Written by: Andrew Percival Younger; George C. Hull
- Based on: A Kentucky Cinderella by F. Hopkinson Smith
- Produced by: Carl Laemmle
- Starring: Gladys Walton; J. Farrell MacDonald; Louis Willoughby
- Cinematography: Earl M. Ellis
- Production company: Universal Pictures
- Distributed by: Universal Pictures
- Release date: April 25, 1921
- Running time: 50 minutes
- Country: United States
- Languages: Silent; English intertitles

Desperate Youth is a 1921 American silent drama film directed by Harry B. Harris and starring Gladys Walton, J. Farrell MacDonald and Louis Willoughby.

== Cast ==
- Gladys Walton as Rosemary Merridew
- J. Farrell MacDonald as 'Mendocino' Bill
- Louis Willoughby as 'Alabam' Spencer Merridew / Henry Merridew
- Muriel Godfrey Turner as Mrs. Merridew
- Hazel Howell as Pauline Merridew
- Harold Miller as Dr. Tom Dowling
- Lucretia Harris as Aunt Chlordiny
- Jim Blackwell as Sam

== Bibliography ==
- Connelly, Robert B. The Silents: Silent Feature Films, 1910-36, Volume 40, Issue 2. December Press, 1998.
- Munden, Kenneth White. The American Film Institute Catalog of Motion Pictures Produced in the United States, Part 1. University of California Press, 1997.
