= Pink Tights =

1920 film by B. Reeves Eason

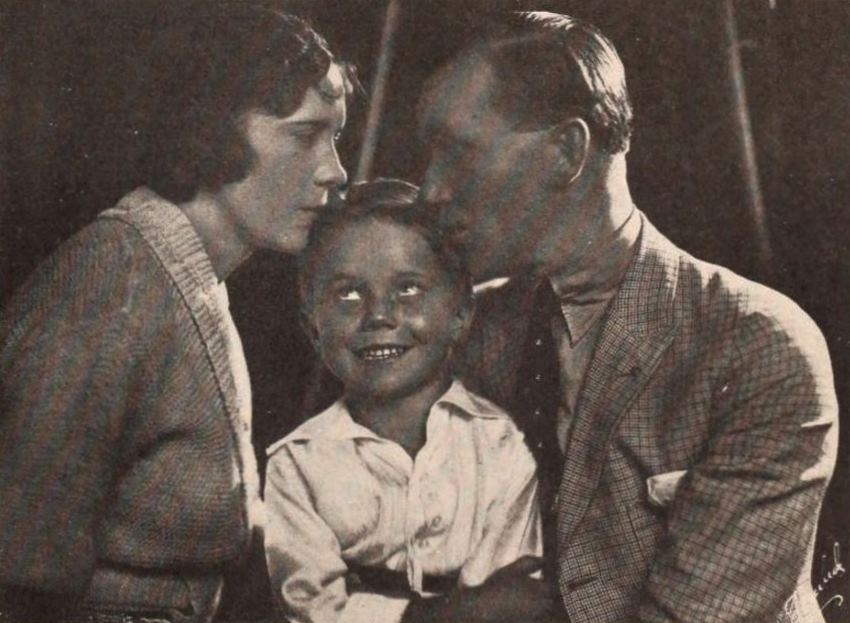
- Gladys Walton, Eason Jr., Eason Sr.
- Directed by: B. Reeves Eason
- Written by: Philip D. Hurn
- Story by: J. U. Giesy
- Produced by: Carl Laemmle
- Starring: Gladys Walton
- Cinematography: Virgil Miller
- Distributed by: Universal Film Manufacturing Company
- Release date: September 25, 1920
- Running time: 5 reels
- Country: United States
- Language: Silent

Pink Tights is a surviving 1920 American silent romantic comedy-drama film directed by B. Reeves Eason and starring Gladys Walton. It was produced and released by Universal Film Manufacturing Company.

A print is held by the Danish Film Institute.

== Cast ==
- Gladys Walton as Mazie Darton
- Jack Perrin as Rev. Jonathan Meek
- Dave Winter as Jerry McKeen
- Stanton Heck as Bullato
- Rosa Gore as Mrs. Shamfeller
- Dan Crimmins as Smiley Dodd
- Dorothea Wolbert as Mrs. Bump
- B. Reeves Eason Jr. as Johnny Bump
- Martin Neilan as Willie Shamfeller
