= Rich Girl, Poor Girl =

1921 film

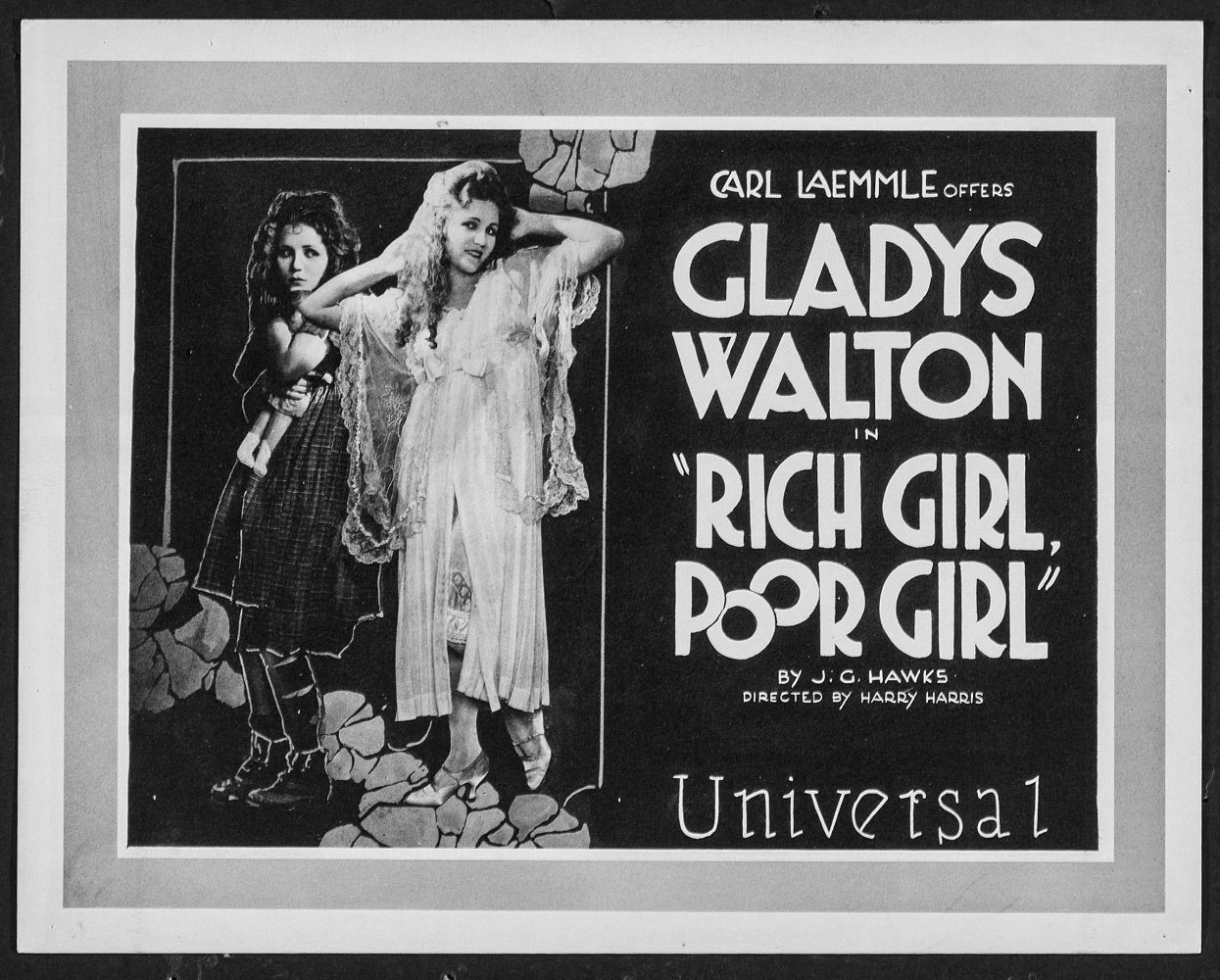
- Lobby card
- Directed by: Harry B. Harris
- Written by: J.G. Hawks; A.P. Younger
- Produced by: Carl Laemmle
- Starring: Gladys Walton; Gordon McGregor; Harold Austin; Antrim Short; Joe Neary; Wadsworth Harris; Charles Herzinger
- Cinematography: Earl M. Ellis
- Distributed by: Universal Film Manufacturing Company
- Release date: January 24, 1921 (U.S.)
- Running time: 5 reels
- Country: United States
- Languages: Silent film (English intertitles)

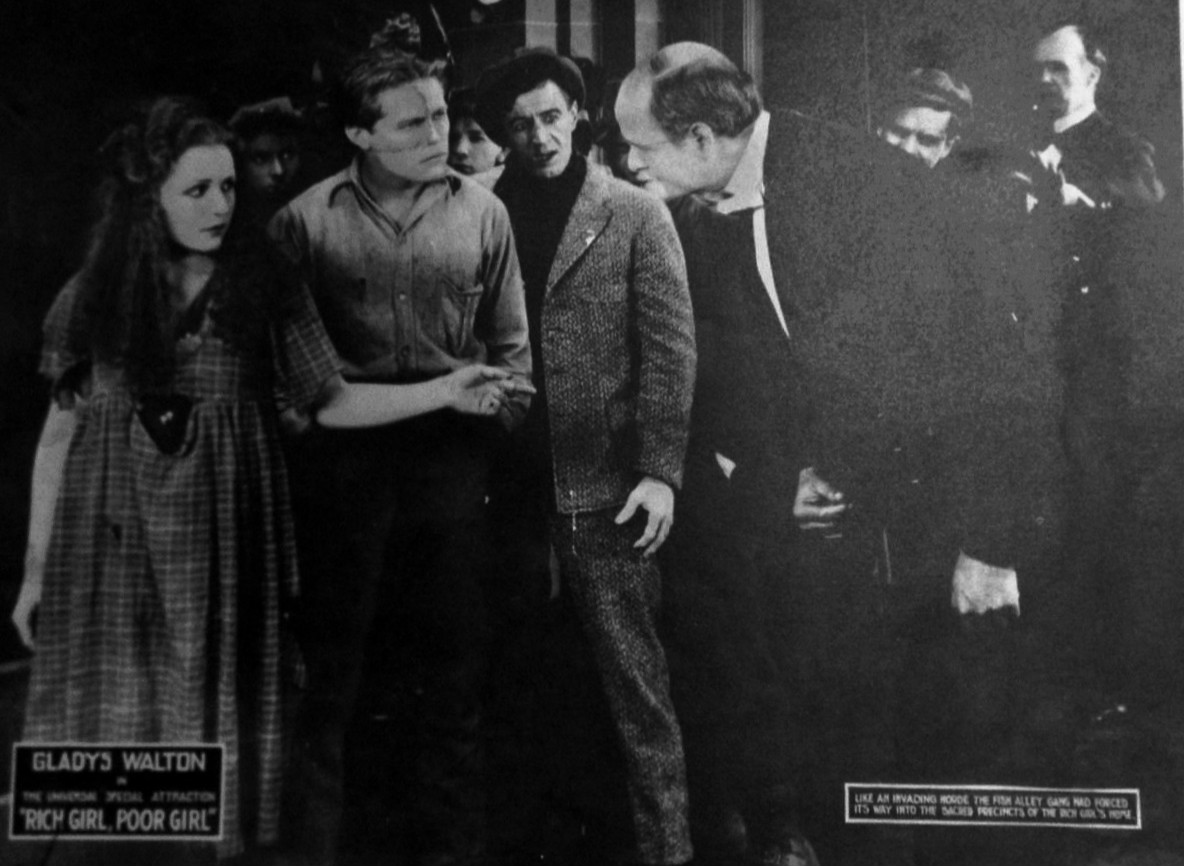
Lobby card with scene from the film.

Rich Girl, Poor Girl is a 1921 American silent drama film directed by Harry B. Harris and written by J.G. Hawks and A.P. Younger. The film stars Gladys Walton, Gordon McGregor, Harold Austin, Antrim Short, Joe Neary, Wadsworth Harris, and Charles Herzinger. It was released on January 24, 1921, by Universal Film Manufacturing Company.

== Cast ==
- Gladys Walton as Nora McShane/Beatrice Vanderfleet
- Gordon McGregor as Terry McShane
- Harold Austin as Reginald
- Antrim Short as Muggsy
- Joe Neary as Spider
- Wadsworth Harris as Vanderfleet
- Charles Herzinger as Boggs

== Preservation ==
It is unknown whether the film survives as no copies have been located, likely lost.
