= Top o' the Morning (1922 film) =

1922 film by Edward Laemmle

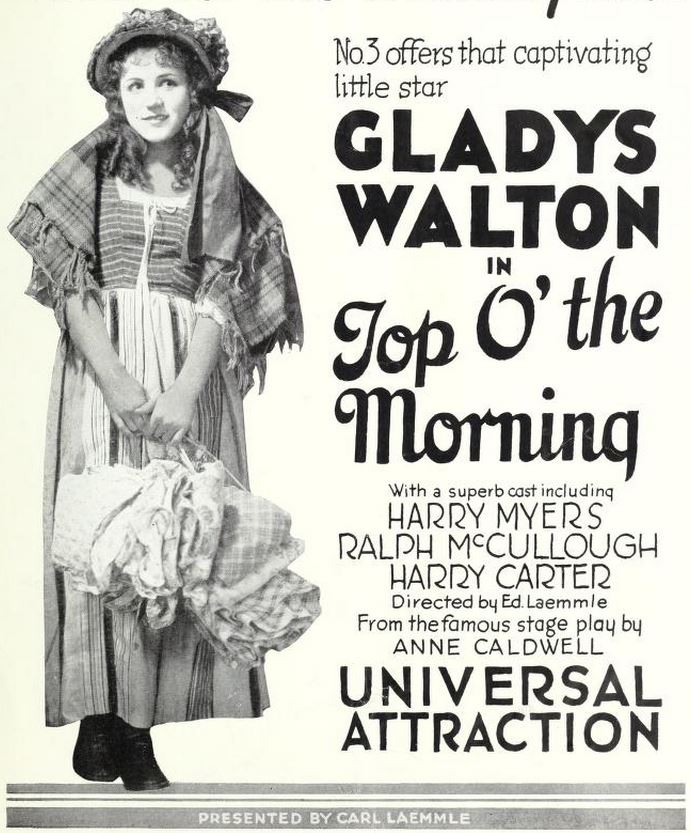
- Advertisement
- Directed by: Edward Laemmle
- Written by: George Randolph Chester; Wallace Clifton
- Based on: Top o' the Mornin by Anne Caldwell
- Produced by: Carl Laemmle
- Cinematography: Charles J. Stumar
- Distributed by: Universal Film Manufacturing Company
- Release date: September 4, 1922
- Running time: 50 minutes; 5 reels
- Country: United States
- Language: Silent (English intertitles)

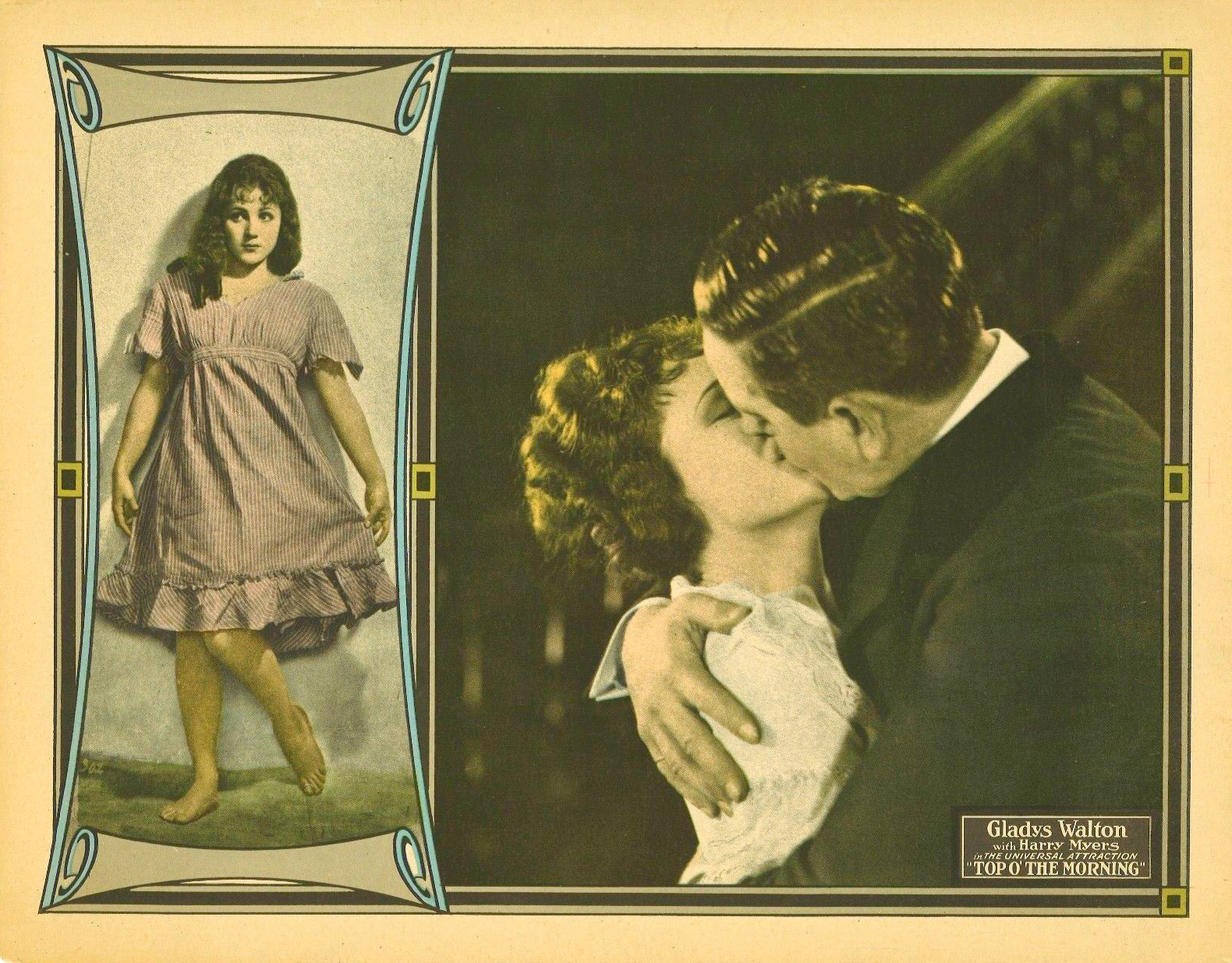
Lobby card

Top o' the Morning is a lost 1922 silent romantic drama film directed by Edward Laemmle and starring Gladys Walton. It was produced and distributed by Universal Film Manufacturing Company.

== Plot ==
As described in a film magazine, Geraldine "Jerry" O'Donnell, a winsome Irish colleen, is happy at the thought that she will soon visit her father and brother in America, but once there she finds her stepmother making her life unbearable, and she decides to run away. After leaving a farewell note to her father, she accidentally meets young American banker John Garland, who remembers her from the previous summer as a lass of Old Ireland. Learning of her plight, he offers to take her into his home as a governess to his little daughter Dot, who has adored Jerry since meeting her in County Kerry. Separated from her father, afraid that her brother may be sent to prison for a crime he did not commit, and having few of the stuff of which happiness is made, Jerry learns about life. She eventually becomes an American girl and wife.

== Cast ==
- Gladys Walton as "Jerry" O'Donnell
- Harry Myers as John Garland
- Doreen Turner as Dot Garland
- Florence D. Lee as Jerry's Aunt
- William Welsh as Dermott O'Donnell
- Don Bailey as Mulrooney
- Richard Henry Cummings as Father Quinn (credited as Dick Cummings)
- Margaret Campbell as Mrs. O'Donnell
- Ralph McCullough as Eugene O'Donnell
- Ethel Shannon as Katherine Vincent
- Harry Carter as Blakely Stone
- William Moran as Thomas Wilson
- Sally Russell as Katie McDougal
- Martha Mattox as Miss Murdock
