= The White Outlaw =

The White Outlaw may refer to:

- The White Outlaw (1925 film), an American silent Western film directed by Clifford Smith
- The White Outlaw (1929 film), an American silent Western film directed by Robert J. Horner
