= Terror Trail =

Terror Trail may refer to:

- Terror Trail (1921 film)
- Terror Trail (1933 film)
- Terror Trail (1946 film), directed by Ray Nazarro
