= Albert J. Smith (actor) =

American actor

- Born: February 15, 1894; Chicago, Illinois, U.S.
- Died: April 11, 1939 (aged 45); Hollywood, California, U.S.
- Occupation: Actor
- Years active: 1921–1937

Albert J. Smith (February 15, 1894 – April 11, 1939) was an American film actor. He appeared in more than 80 films between 1921 and 1937.

== Selected filmography ==
- The Diamond Queen (1921) - Professor Ramsey
- Terror Trail (1921) - Hunch Henderson
- The Man Trackers (1921) - Hanley
- The Radio King (1922) - Renally
- Wolf Tracks (1923) - 'Wolf' Santell
- The Eagle's Talons (1923) - Thorne's Henchman
- In the Days of Daniel Boone (1923) - Captain Charles Redmond
- The Steel Trail (1923, Serial) - Ralph Dayton
- The Fast Express (1924, Serial) - Edward Winston
- Big Timber (1924) - Fred Hampden
- The Measure of a Man (1924) - Jack Flack
- The Sunset Trail (1924) - Dick Fenlow
- The Riddle Rider (1924, Serial)
- The Taming of the West (1925) - Lafe Conners
- Barriers of the Law (1925) - Aide to Redding
- Straight Through (1925) - Granger
- The Burning Trail (1925) - Texas
- Blood and Steel (1925) - Jurgin
- The Meddler (1925) - Bud Meyers
- The Circus Cyclone (1925) - Steve Brant
- Ace of Spades (1925, Serial) - Joe Deneen
- The Scarlet Streak (1925) - Count 'K'
- Strings of Steel (1926) - Peter Allen
- Scotty of the Scouts (1926, Serial) - Eric Jandrau
- Speed Crazed (1926) - Dave Marker
- The Silent Flyer (1926) - Jack Hutchins
- The Call of the Wilderness (1926) - Red Morgan
- Whispering Sage (1927) - Ed Fallows
- Red Clay (1927) - Jack Burr
- Hard Fists (1927) - Charles Crane
- Hills of Peril (1927) - Rand
- Where Trails Begin (1927) - Bruce Hodges
- The Western Rover (1927) - Bud Barstry
- Perils of the Jungle (1927) - Brute Hanley
- The Swift Shadow (1927) - Butch Kemp
- Whispering Smith (1927. Serial)
- The Bullet Mark (1928)
- Law of Fear (1928) - Steve Benton / The Hunchbacked Masked Bandit
- Dog Justice (1928) - Pierre La Grande (prospector)
- Tracked (1928) - Lem Hardy
- The Gate Crasher (1928) - Pedro
- Fury of the Wild (1929) - Red Hawkins
- Outlawed (1929) - Dervish
- The Drifter (1929) - Pete Lawson
- Overland Bound (1929) - Keno Creager
- Shadow Ranch (1930) - Dan Blake
- Desert Vengeance (1931) - McBride
- The Lightning Flyer (1931) - Durkin
- Branded (1931) - Joe Moore
- One Man Law (1932) - Carver (uncredited)
- Border Devils (1932) - Inspector Bell
- Dynamite Ranch (1932) - Red - Henchman
- Hello Trouble (1932) - Jim Vaughn
- The Last Mile (1932) - Drake - Guard
- McKenna of the Mounted (1932) - Sgt. Maj. Hawley (uncredited)
- The Last Man (1932) - Halborn
- Between Fighting Men (1932) - Butch Martin
- Forbidden Trail (1932) - Henchman Burke
- The Telegraph Trail (1933) - Gus Lynch
- The Thrill Hunter (1933) - Sheriff
- Madame Spy (1934) - Lackey
- Honor of the Range (1934) - Smoky - Henchman
- The Most Precious Thing in Life (1934) - Man at Football Game (uncredited)
- The Prescott Kid (1934) - Frazier
- The Westerner (1934) - Sheriff
- Mills of the Gods (1934) - Switchman
- Love Me Forever (1935) - Henchman / Head Carpenter (uncredited)
- Sutter's Gold (1936) - Man (uncredited)
- Pride of the Marines (1936) - Conductor (uncredited)
- The King Steps Out (1936) - Announcer (uncredited)
- Two-Fisted Gentleman (1936) - Manager
- Alibi for Murder (1936) - Mike (uncredited)
- Code of the Range (1936) - Barney Ross
- The Gold Racket (1937) - Fraser
- Prairie Thunder (1937) - Lynch
