= Beasts of Paradise =

1923 film

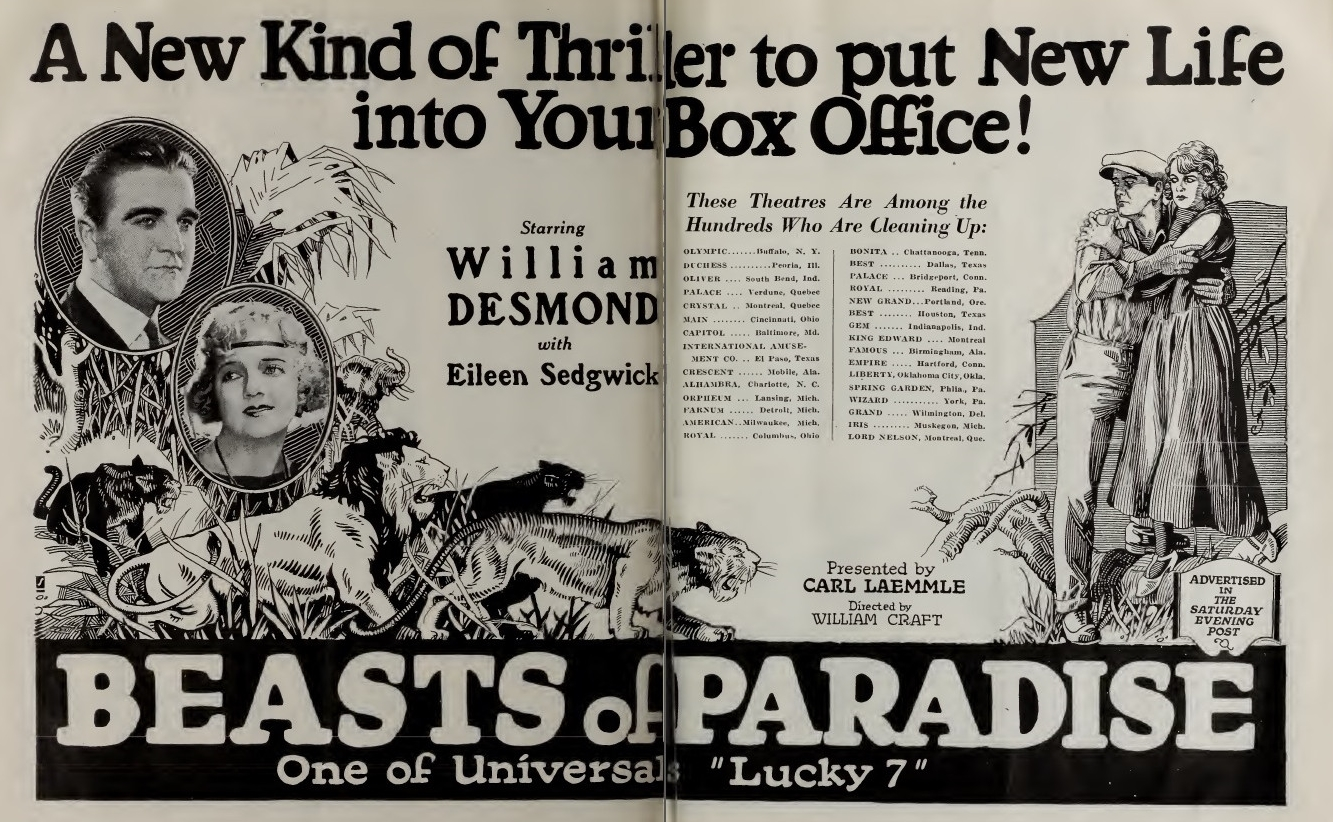
- Advertisement for film
- Directed by: William James Craft
- Written by: Val Cleveland
- Starring: William Desmond; Eileen Sedgwick
- Production company: Universal Pictures
- Distributed by: Universal Pictures
- Release date: October 1, 1923
- Running time: 15 episodes
- Country: United States
- Language: Silent (English intertitles)

Beasts of Paradise is a 1923 American adventure silent film serial in 15 episodes directed by William James Craft. The film stars William Desmond and Eileen Sedgwick and was produced and released by Universal Pictures. The film is presumed to be lost.

== Production ==
The serial consists of 15 episodes including jungle adventure scenes in which the main characters contend with many wild animals, such as fights with lions, alligators and elephants. The film also contains aquatic sequences involving underwater fights, shark encounters and submarine adventures. Some scenes were shot on location at Santa Cruz Island.

== Cast ==
- William Desmond as Phil Grant
- Eileen Sedgwick as Helen Frazer
- William Gould (credited as William N. Gould)
- Ruth Royce as Marie Verne
- Margaret Morris as Tilah
- James Welsh (credited as Jim Welsh)
- Clark Comstock
- Joe Bonomo as Big Jack
- Slim Cole
- Alfred Fisher
- Gordon McGregor
- William Welsh (credited as William J. Welsh)

== Chapter titles ==
- Episode 1: "The Mystery Ships"
- Episode 2: "Unseen Perils"
- Episode 3: "The Typhoon"
- Episode 4: "The Sea Raider"
- Episode 5: "The Tidewater Trap"
- Episode 6: "The Alligator Attacks"
- Episode 7: "The Deluge"
- Episode 8: "The Mutiny"
- Episode 9: "Ship Aflame"
- Episode 10: "The Mad Elephant Charge"
- Episode 11: "Smothered in the Sands"
- Episode 12: "Millions in Gold"
- Episode 13: "Into the Bloodhound's Jaws"
- Episode 14: "Into the Whirlpool"
- Episode 15: "The Trail's End"

== See also ==
- List of American films of 1923
- List of film serials
- List of film serials by studio
