= The Diamond Queen (1921 film) =

1921 film

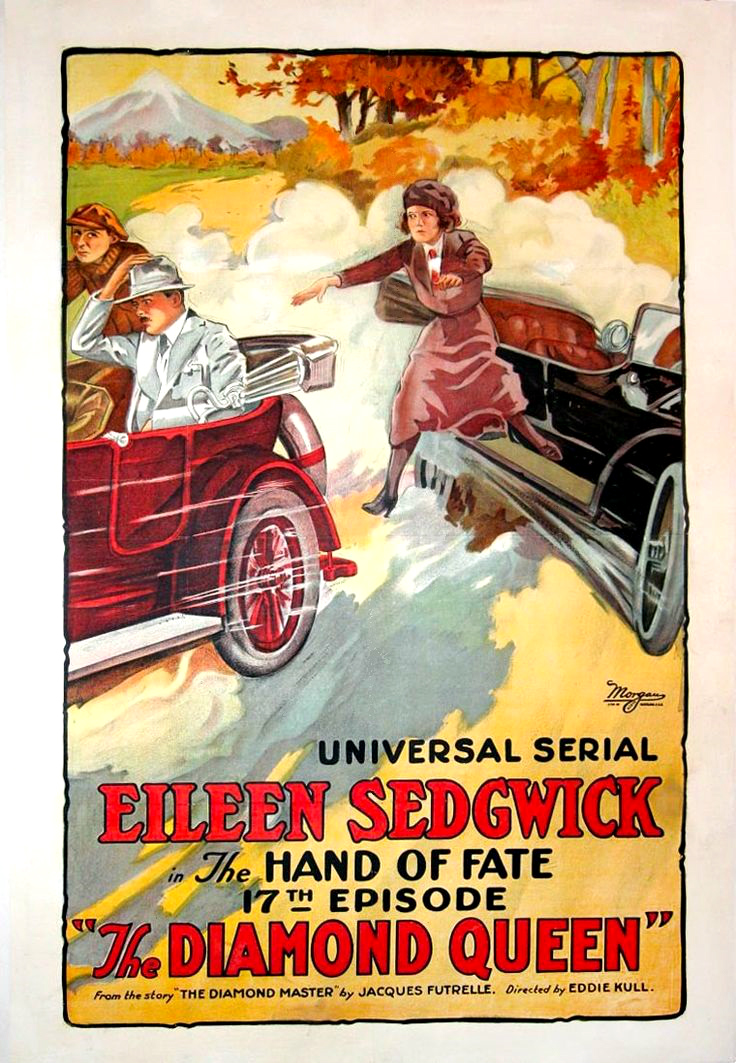
- Film poster
- Directed by: Edward A. Kull
- Written by: Jacques Futrelle; George W. Pyper; Robert F. Roden
- Starring: Eileen Sedgwick; George Chesebro
- Distributed by: Universal Film Manufacturing Co.
- Release date: March 15, 1921
- Running time: 18 episodes
- Country: United States
- Language: Silent (English intertitles)

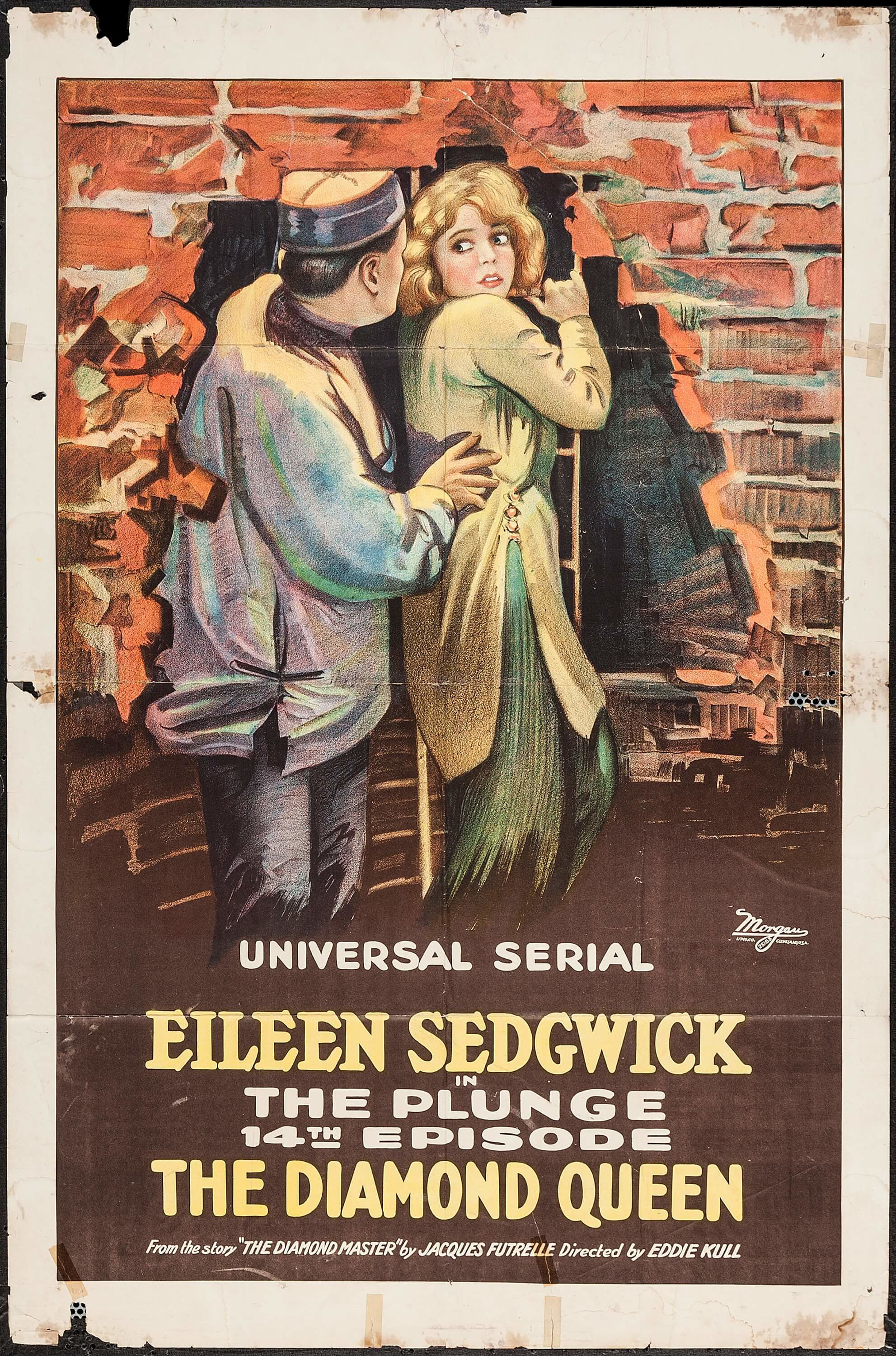
Poster for the 14th episode

The Diamond Queen is a 1921 American adventure film serial directed by Edward A. Kull. The film is considered to be lost. The creator of the story Jacques Futrelle was lost in the Titanic disaster in 1912.

== Cast ==
- Eileen Sedgwick as Doris Harvey
- George Chesebro as Bruce Weston
- Frank Clark as Julius Zeidt (credited as Frank Clarke)
- Burton S. Wilson as John Harvey (credited as Burton Wilson)
- Alfred Fisher as Professor Harvey
- Josephine Scott as Aline Earl
- Lew Short as Reitman (credited as Lou Short)
- Albert J. Smith as Professor Ramsey (credited as Al Smith)

== Chapter titles ==
1. Vow of Vengeance
2. Plunge of Doom
3. Perils of the Jungle
4. Fires of Hate
5. Tide of Destiny
6. The Colossal Game
7. An Amazing Ultimatum
8. In Merciless Clutches
9. A Race with Rogues
10. The Betrayal
11. In Torture's Grip
12. The Kidnapping
13. Weird Walls
14. The Plunge
15. The Decoy
16. The Dip of Death
17. The Hand of Fate
18. The Hour of Reckoning

== See also ==
- List of film serials
- List of film serials by studio
