= The Lure of the Circus =

1918 film

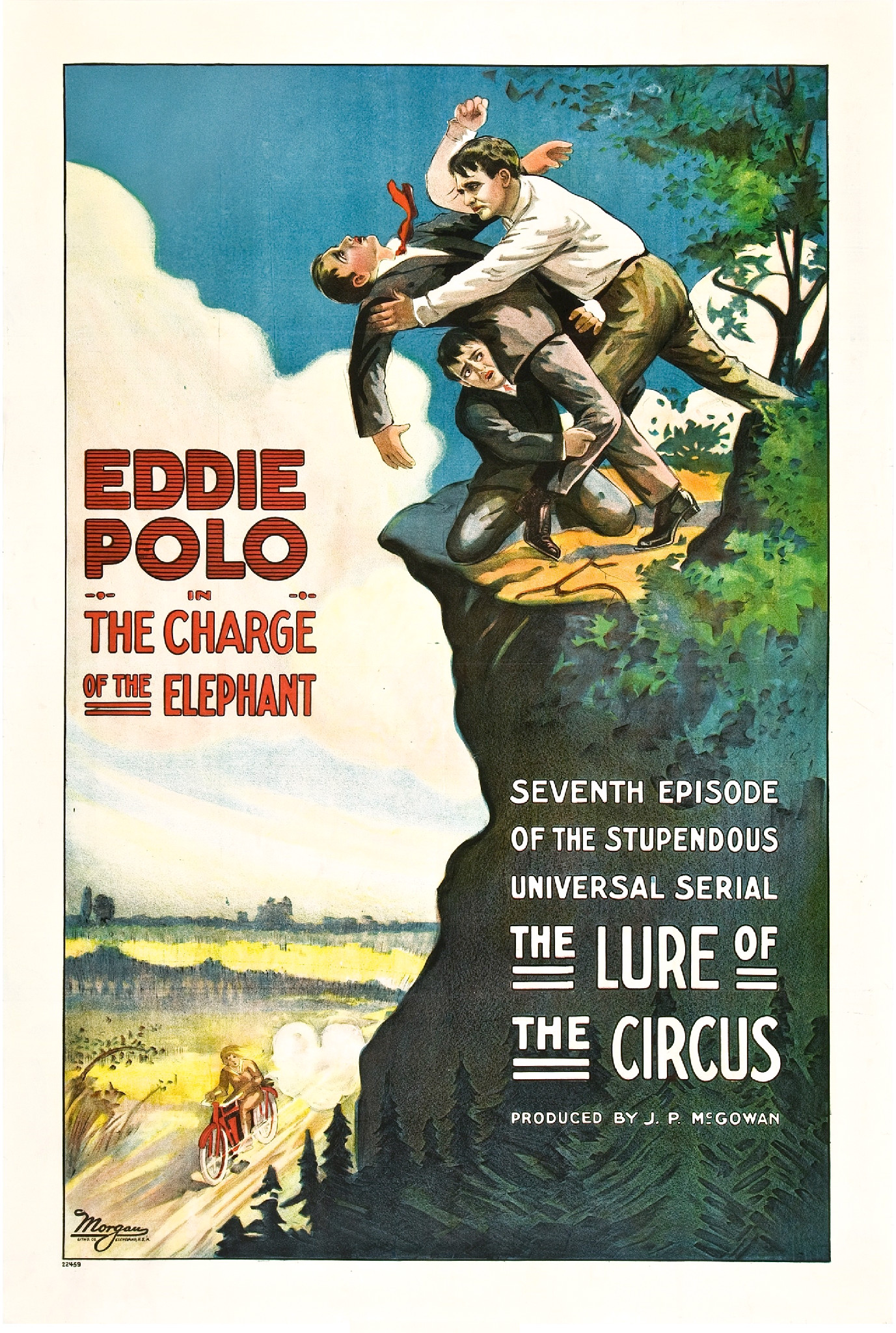
- Film poster
- Directed by: J. P. McGowan
- Written by: Hope Loring; William E. Wing
- Starring: Eddie Polo; Eileen Sedgwick
- Distributed by: Universal Film Manufacturing Co.
- Release date: November 18, 1918
- Running time: 18 episodes
- Country: United States
- Language: Silent (English intertitles)

The Lure of the Circus is a 1918 American adventure film serial directed by J. P. McGowan for Universal.

== Cast ==
- Eddie Polo as Eddie Somers
- Eileen Sedgwick as Alicia Page
- Molly Malone as Nan Harden - Chapters 1 thru 5
- Harry Carter as Edward Lawrence
- Noble Johnson as Silent Andy
- Fred Starr as Steve Harden (as Frederick Starr)
- Duke R. Lee as Richard Van Norman
- Charles Hill Mailes as Malcolm Somers
- James Gordon as Guy Brock
- Andrew Waldron as Dynamite Dan
- Fred Montague as Howard Mason
- Sydney Deane as Reynolds (as Sidney Deane)
- Josie Sedgwick

== Chapter Titles ==
1. The Big Tent
2. The Giant's Leap
3. Beaten Back
4. The Message On The Cuff
5. The Lip Reader
6. The Aerial Disaster
7. The Charge of The Elephant
8. The Human Ladder
9. The Flying Loop
10. A Shot For Life
11. The Dagger
12. A Strange Escape
13. A Plunge For Life
14. Flames
15. The Stolen Record
16. The Knockout
17. A Race With Time
18. The Last Trick

== See also ==
- List of film serials
- List of film serials by studio
