= The Fighting Ranger (serial) =

1925 film

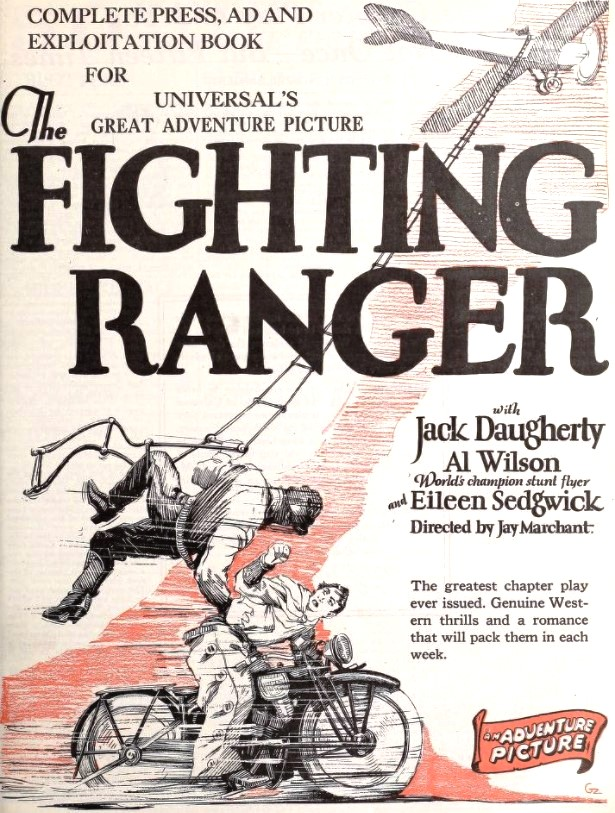
- Advertisement
- Directed by: Jay Marchant
- Written by: Fred McConnell; George W. Pyper
- Starring: Jack Dougherty; Eileen Sedgwick
- Distributed by: Universal Pictures
- Release date: May 11, 1925
- Running time: 18 episodes
- Country: United States
- Languages: Silent; English intertitles

The Fighting Ranger is a 1925 American silent Western film serial directed by Jay Marchant and starring Jack Dougherty. The film is now considered to be lost.

== Plot ==
As described in a review in a film magazine, fifteen years earlier, John Marshall, a prosperous cattle raiser, shot a man. He knew the act was justifiable, but because of the political influence of his victim he felt his only recourse was to flee. Taking his little daughter, he hid himself in a fastness of the mountains that constitute a part of his vast ranch. The only man he trusts in the outside world is Topaz Taggart, a political boss and all-round tricky citizen, who is really trying to get Marshall's ranch as he knows that buried on it is a fabulous treasure that is guarded by an aged Yaqui, the last of his tribe. Bud Hughes, one time an aviator but now a tramp, has attached himself to Marshall's hiding place which also includes Miguel Cordero, a faithful Mexican workman. One day Terrence O'Rourke, a forest ranger with a double mission, drops into the hiding place because, due to a wound, he lost control of his airplane. Marshall's daughter Mary, now grown into womanhood, nurses the young man back to health. From here, in later chapters Terrence becomes her and her father's protector in a series of disheartening experiences at the hands of Taggart and his tools.

== Cast ==
- Jack Dougherty as Terrence O'Rourke (credited as Jack Daugherty)
- Eileen Sedgwick as Mary Marshall
- Al Wilson as Bud Hughes
- Bud Osborne as Topaz Taggart
- William Welsh as John Marshall
- Charles Avery as Miguel Cordero
- Frank Lanning as Komi
- Sam Polo as Ramon
- Slim Cole as Buck
- Gladys Roy as Stella Montrose

== Chapter titles ==
1. The Intruder
2. The Frame-Up
3. The Secret Trail
4. Falsely Accused
5. The Betrayal
6. The Lost Fortune
7. Cattle Wolves
8. Under Fire
9. Man to Man
10. The Fatal Message
11. Hidden Fangs
12. False Friends
13. Stolen Secrets
14. Steeds of the Sky
15. Yaqui Gold
16. Left for Dead
17. Yaqui Gold
18. [Unknown title]

== See also ==
- List of American films of 1925
- List of film serials
- List of film serials by studio
- List of lost films
