= Taking a Chance =

1928 film

- Directed by: Norman Z. McLeod
- Screenplay by: A.H. Halprin
- Based on: The Saint of Calamity Gulch by Bret Harte
- Starring: Rex Bell; Lola Todd; Richard Carlyle; Billy Butts; Jack Byron; Martin Cichy
- Cinematography: Sol Halperin
- Edited by: J. Logan Pearson
- Production company: Fox Film Corporation
- Distributed by: Fox Film Corporation
- Release date: November 18, 1928
- Running time: 70 minutes
- Country: United States
- Languages: Silent; English intertitles

Taking a Chance is a 1928 American silent Western film directed by Norman Z. McLeod and written by A.H. Halprin. The film stars Rex Bell, Lola Todd, Richard Carlyle, Billy Butts, Jack Byron and Martin Cichy. The film was released on November 18, 1928, by Fox Film Corporation.

== Cast ==
- Rex Bell as Joe Courtney
- Lola Todd as Jessie Smith
- Richard Carlyle as Dan Carson
- Billy Butts as Little Billy
- Jack Byron as Pete
- Martin Cichy as Luke
- Jack Henderson as Jake
