= Frederic Arnold Kummer =

American screenwriter (1873–1943)

Frederic Arnold Kummer Sr.
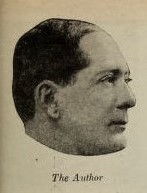
- Kummer (c. 1924)
- Born: Frederic Arnold Kummer; August 5, 1873; Catonsville, Maryland, U.S.
- Died: November 22, 1943 (aged 70); Baltimore, Maryland, U.S.
- Resting place: Loudon Park Cemetery; Baltimore, Maryland, U.S.
- Other name: Arnold Fredericks
- Education: Rensselaer Polytechnic Institute
- Occupations: Author; playwright; screenwriter

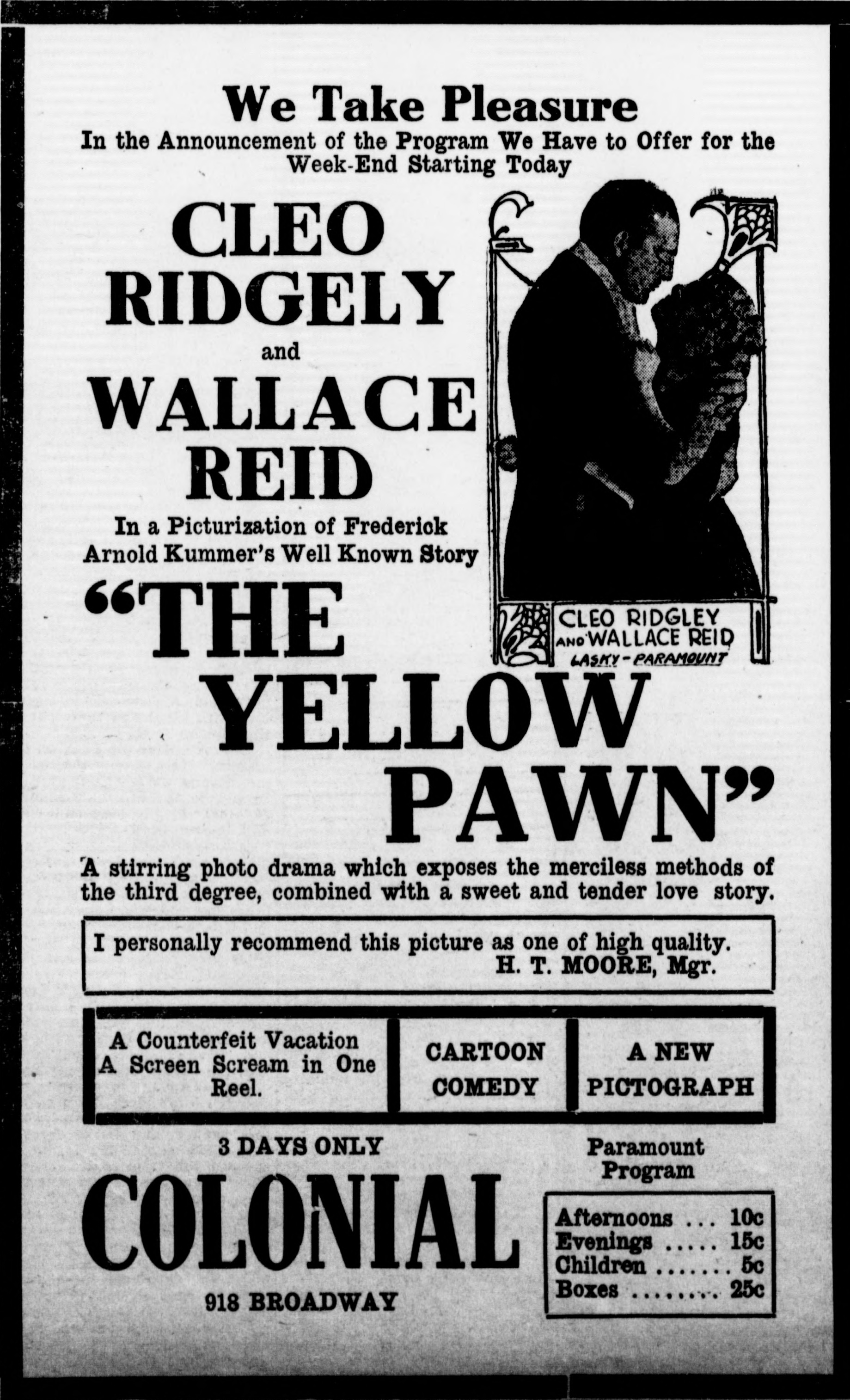
Advertisement for The Yellow Pawn

Frederic Arnold Kummer Sr. (August 5, 1873 – November 22, 1943) was an American author, playwright and screenwriter. He also used the pseudonym Arnold Fredericks. Several of his works were made into movies. A caricature of him is on the wall of Sardi's restaurant.

== Early life ==
Frederic Arnold Kummer was born in Catonsville, Maryland, to Arnold Kummer. His father was a banker and his mother was of a Quaker family. He was educated in public schools and Rensselaer Polytechnic Institute.

== Career ==
Kummer became a life member of the American Society of Civil Engineers and assistant editor of the Railroad Gazette. He also became the president of a wood block paving company, but the company failed during the Panic of 1907. Kummer then became an author.

Kummer wrote stories and plays. He wrote the play The Painted Woman which premiered at the Auditorium Theatre in 1917. It came to Baltimore in 1938 as the opera Captive, with music by Gustav Strube.

In testimony to the House of Representatives Special Committee on Un-American Activities, he was named by Counsel Robert Lynch as a member of the executive committee of the XV International Brigade, a volunteer military unit which fought for the pro-socialist Republic of Spain during the Spanish Civil War.

== Personal life ==
Kummer built a house in Guilford, Maryland. Following this, he relocated to West Lafayette, and later Park Avenue in Baltimore.

Kummer married twice. He first married playwright Clare Kummer (born Clare Rodman Beecher) in 1895. They had two daughters, Marjorie (who married English actor Roland Young) and Frederica. They divorced during 1903 (she was remarried to Arthur Henry in 1910). Kummer also had three more children. His son Frederic Arnold Kummer Jr. was also an author.

In 1927, Kummer was hospitalized at Union Memorial Hospital and newspapers falsely reported his death. He died on November 22, 1943, at his home at 1501 Park Avenue in Baltimore. He was buried at Loudon Park Cemetery.

== Legacy ==
A Liberty Ship was named after him during World War II.

== Filmography ==
- Adventure of the Absent Minded Professor (1914)
- Adventure of the Counterfeit Money (1914)
- Adventure of the Missing Legacy (1914)
- The Yellow Pawn (1916)
- The Belgian (1917)
- The Slave Market (1917)
- The Town Scandal (1923)

== Writings ==
- The Brute
- The First Days of Man
- The Green God
- The Little Fortune (1915)
- Peggy-Elise (1919)
- Shades of Hades
- Love's Greatest Mistake
- Forbidden Wine
- The Web
- A Song of Sixpence
- Gentlemen in Hades: The Story of a Damned Debutante
- "Honeymoon Detectives" series (Richard and Grace Duvall: One Million Francs; The Ivory Snuff-Box; The Blue Lights; The Film of Fear)
- Leif Erikson, the Lucky
- The Torch of Liberty (1941)
- Death at Eight Bells: A Novel (1937)
- The Pipes of Yesterday
- Eternal Conflict
- Death at Eight Bells
- The Emigrant, a play in three acts
- The First Days of Man
- The First Days of Knowledge

=== Short stories ===
- "Mr. Buttles"
- "The Choice"
- "Are You a Suffragette?"
- "The Canterbury Cathedral Murder" (with Basil Mitchell)
