= Prowlers of the Night =

1926 film

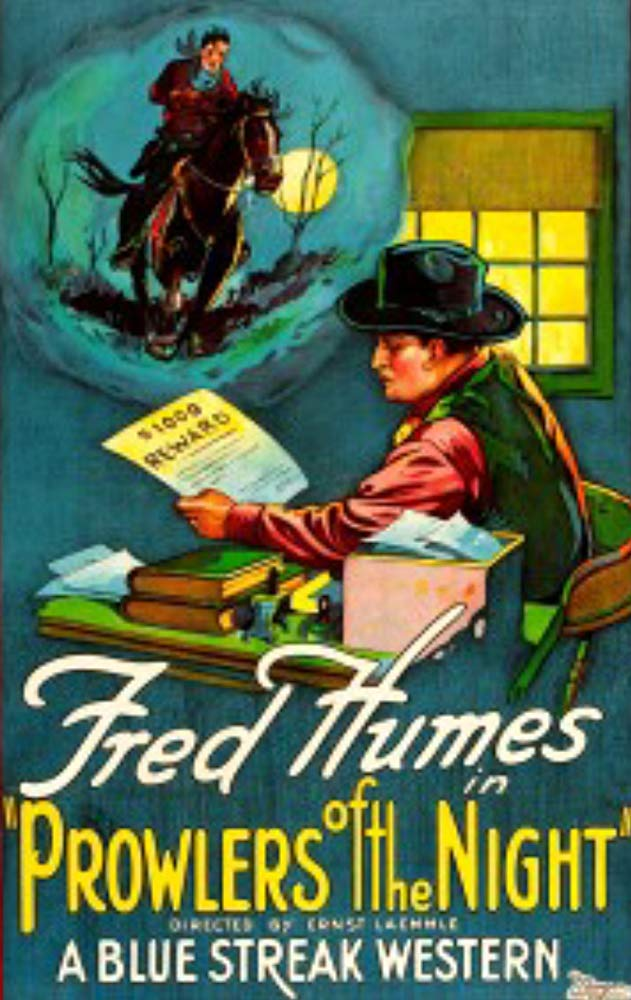
- Film poster
- Directed by: Ernst Laemmle
- Written by: Emil Forst; Ernst Laemmle
- Produced by: Carl Laemmle
- Starring: Fred Humes; Barbara Kent; Slim Cole
- Cinematography: Edward Ullman
- Production company: Universal Pictures
- Distributed by: Universal Pictures
- Release date: November 21, 1926
- Running time: 50 minutes
- Country: United States
- Language: Silent (English intertitles)

Prowlers of the Night is a 1926 American silent Western film directed by Ernst Laemmle and starring Fred Humes, Barbara Kent, and Slim Cole.

== Plot ==
As described in a film magazine, when sheriff Jack Norton is attacked and badly wounded by a band of bandits, he merely curses his carelessness in permitting himself to be taken unaware and does not realize the wound he received in the encounter is more than flesh deep. Yet when Anita Parsons, a young woman from a nearby farmhouse, binds his wound, he realizes that his heart has been wounded more deeply than his arm. Anita binds his arm with her handkerchief and Jack, on recovering from the gun fight, goes to return it. Anita's father, seeing the sheriff approach attempts to shoot him, and Jack, without knowing it, is saved when Anita steps between her father and the officer. A few days later a bank is robbed and one of the thieves is captured. He refuses to tell the identity of the other members of the gang, so Jack decides on a clever ruse to capture them. He pretends to be a criminal himself and is placed in the same cell with the captive bandit. Once in the cell he gains the gangster's confidence, and then executes an escape from the jail which wins the law-breaker's admiration. The bandit takes his newfound friend to the headquarters of the bank bandits. Jack, upon arriving immediately recognizes the leader of the gang as the father of the woman he loves. Realizing his danger, Jack endeavours to pull his gun, but is too late. In the fight that follows, Jack is saved through an act of Anita. In the fighting her father is killed. While she is loath to accept, as her husband, the man responsible for her father's death, she realizes that Jack was only pursuing his duty, and love finally conquers all.

== Cast ==
- Fred Humes as Jack Norton
- Barbara Kent as Anita Parsons
- Slim Cole as Al Parsons
- John T. Prince as George Moulton
- Joseph Belmont as Sheriff Brandon
- Walter Maly as Bell

== Preservation ==
With no prints of Prowlers of the Night located in any film archives, it is a lost film.

== Bibliography ==
- Langman, Larry. A Guide to Silent Westerns. Greenwood Publishing Group, 1992.
