= Eileen Sedgwick =

American actress (1898–1991)

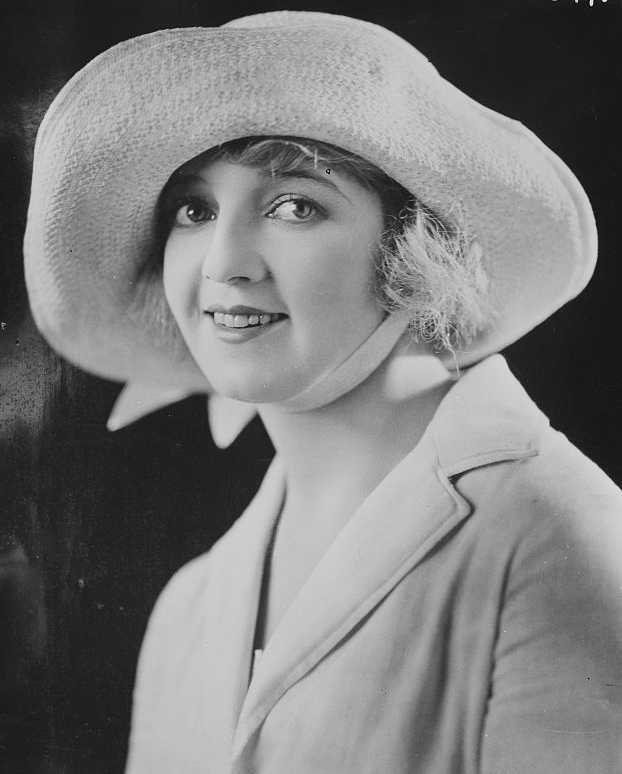
- Born: October 17, 1898; Galveston, Texas, US
- Died: March 15, 1991 (aged 92); Marina del Rey, California, US
- Other name: Gretel Yoltz
- Occupation: Actress
- Years active: 1914–1930
- Known for: Beasts of Paradise; The Diamond Queen; The Lure of the Circus
- Relatives: Edward Sedgwick (brother); Josie Sedgwick (sister)

Eileen Sedgwick (October 17, 1898 – March 15, 1991) was an American actress of the silent era.

== Biography ==
Born in 1898, Sedgwick was in her first film in 1914 and appeared in more than 110 films during her 15-year career. She was the sister of film director Edward Sedgwick and actress Josie Sedgwick.

Sedgwick changed her name to Gretel Yoltz in the fall of 1927, after which she "found constant work". Before the change, Sedgwick was known as "Queen of the Serials" and was typecast in roles in Western films. The actress disappeared for long enough that casting lists no longer included Eileen Sedgwick.

When Gretel Yoltz visited Gotham Productions, affecting an accent and dressed in "a stunning outfit of clothes", she was given a part in the film The River Woman, after which she was cast for a second film. Eventually people began to recognize her and the ruse ended.

== Partial filmography ==
- Man and Beast (1917)
- Hell's Crater (1918)
- The Lure of the Circus (1918)
- The Great Radium Mystery (1919)
- The Diamond Queen (1921)
- Terror Trail (1921)
- In the Days of Daniel Boone (1923)
- Beasts of Paradise (1923)
- The Riddle Rider (1924)
- The Fighting Ranger (1925)
- The Sagebrush Lady (1925)
- The Winking Idol (1926)
- Beyond All Odds (1926)
- Strings of Steel (1926)
- Tin Hats (1926)
- Lure of the West (1926)
- When Danger Calls (1927)
- A Girl in Every Port (1928) (credited as Gretel Yoltz)
- The Vanishing West (1928)
- Beautiful But Dumb (1928)
- Yellow Contraband (1928)
- The Jade Box (1930)
