= Desert Guns =

1936 western film

- Directed by: Charles Hutchison
- Written by: Jacques Jaccard
- Produced by: Mitchell Leichter
- Starring: Conway Tearle; Margaret Morris; William Gould
- Cinematography: J. Henry Kruse
- Edited by: Fred Bain
- Production company: Black King Productions
- Distributed by: Beaumont Pictures
- Release date: January 2, 1936
- Running time: 70 minutes
- Country: United States
- Language: English

Desert Guns is a 1936 American Western film directed by Charles Hutchison and starring Conway Tearle, Margaret Morris and William Gould.

== Cast ==
- Conway Tearle as Kirk Allenby / Bob Enright
- Margaret Morris as Roberta Enrright
- William Gould as Jeff Bagley
- Budd Buster as Utah Carroll
- Kate Brinker as Cherry
- Duke R. Lee as Steve Logan
- Marie Werner as Mary Carroll
- Charles K. French as The Colonel
- Pinkey Barnes as Hank Morgan
- George Chesebro as Cowboy
- Fred Church as Cal Jennings
- Art Felix as Henchman Norton
- Ray Gallagher as Deputy
- Buck Morgan as Henchman Slocum
- Horace Murphy as Doctor Jeff D. Stanley
- Bill Patton as Sheriff Slade
- Slim Whitaker as Henchman

== Bibliography ==
- Pitts, Michael R. Western Movies: A Guide to 5,105 Feature Films. McFarland, 2012.
