= Single-Handed Sanders =

1932 film

- Directed by: Charles A. Post
- Written by: Adele Buffington; Charles A. Post
- Produced by: Trem Carr
- Starring: Tom Tyler; Margaret Morris
- Cinematography: Archie Stout
- Edited by: Pat O'Brien
- Production company: Trem Carr Pictures
- Distributed by: Monogram Pictures
- Release date: February 10, 1932
- Running time: 61 minutes
- Country: United States
- Language: English

Single-Handed Sanders is a 1932 American pre-Code Western film directed by Charles A. Post and starring Tom Tyler and Margaret Morris.

== Cast ==
- Tom Tyler as Matt Sanders
- Robert Seiter as Phillip Sanders
- Margaret Morris as Alice Parker
- John Elliott as Senator Graham
- Gordon De Main as Judge Parker
- Fred 'Snowflake' Toones as Snowflake
- Loie Bridge as Mrs. Perkins
- Hank Bell as Hank Perkins

== Bibliography ==
- Martin, Len D. The Allied Artists Checklist: The Feature Films and Short Subjects of Allied Artists Pictures Corporation, 1947-1978. McFarland & Company, 1993.
