= The Thrill Hunter (1933 film) =

1933 film

- Film poster
- Directed by: George B. Seitz
- Written by: Harry O. Hoyt
- Produced by: Irving Briskin
- Starring: Buck Jones; Dorothy Revier
- Cinematography: Ted Tetzlaff
- Edited by: Gene Milford
- Distributed by: Columbia Pictures
- Release date: April 30, 1933
- Running time: 60 minutes
- Country: United States
- Language: English

The Thrill Hunter is a 1933 American pre-Code comedy film directed by George B. Seitz. Buck Jones stars as a habitual teller of tall tales, while Dorothy Revier plays the film star he tries to impress.

== Plot ==
Braggart Buck Crosby rescues movie star Marjorie Lane when her horse bolts during location shooting. She invites him to dinner, where he regales the film crew with tall tales of his exploits. When someone notices his resemblance to a noted car racer, he takes credit for that, too. After he leaves, he is attracted to a commotion in an isolated cabin. Shots ring out, and he finds two men dead inside. They turn out to be members of the Blake gang, which just pulled off a $100,000 gold robbery. Buck finds a locket and keeps it, then claims the reward for shooting the two men. This latest exploit convinces director Ed Jackson to invite Buck to go to Hollywood and star opposite Marjorie in her next picture.

Much to Buck's dismay, Jackson has believed his stories about being an expert driver and pilot. Buck is expected to drive a high-powered car around an oval track and fly a biplane. After a hair-raising few minutes, he crashes the car. He then tries to learn how to fly overnight. However, he is spotted at an airplane simulator/ride by Roy Lang, assistant to studio producer Sam Levine. Roy informs Sam that Buck is a fake. They rush out to the airport, but not in time. Buck takes off, flies around, then crashes. When they pull him out of the wreckage unscathed, Sam fires him on the spot. Buck confesses and apologizes to Marjorie, then hops on a freight train.

When he gets off, two other riders take him at gunpoint back to the cabin where he found the bodies. They turn out to be Al Blake and Lou Norton, the other members of the Blake gang. Al wants the locket, which is said to have the directions to where the gold is stashed hidden in it. Buck tells them he gave it to Marjorie. They tie him up and go to the train station. As luck would have it, Marjorie and her crew have returned to resume filming. The robbers kidnap Marjorie. Meanwhile, Buck frees himself and spots them as they drive past. He steals an airplane, gives chase and shoots the two crooks from the air (just like he claimed he shot Japanese officers in China). Afterward, he tells Marjorie he will never lie again. He soon starts to tell her another tall tale, but then sheepishly remembers his promise.

== Cast ==
- Buck Jones as Buck Crosby (as Charles 'Buck' Jones)
- Dorothy Revier as Marjorie Lane
- Edward LeSaint as Director Ed Jackson (as Edward Le Saint)
- Eddie Kane as Sam Levine
- Arthur Rankin as Roy Lang
- Frank LaRue as Rancher Hall (as Frank La Rue)
- Robert Ellis as Al Blake
- Harry Semels as Lou Norton
- Albert J. Smith as Sheriff (as Al Smith)
- John Ince as Mayor Thomas Hewitt
- Harry Todd as Station Agent
- Willie Fung as Wong, the Cook
