= Don Dare Devil =

1925 film

Don Dare-Devil
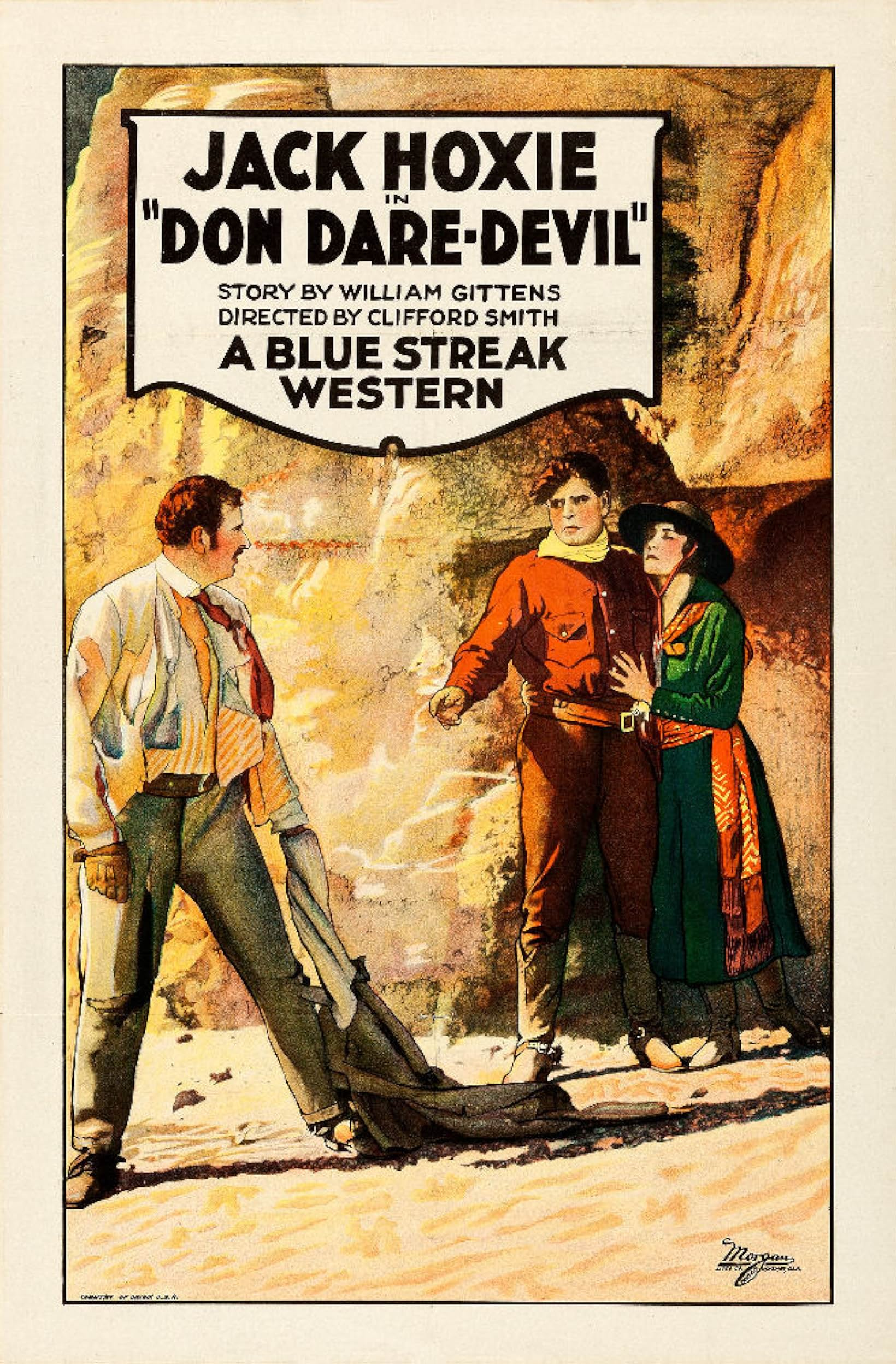
- Theatrical release poster
- Directed by: Clifford Smith
- Screenplay by: Wyndham Gittens
- Starring: Jack Hoxie; Cathleen Calhoun; Duke R. Lee; William Welsh; Thomas G. Lingham; Evelyn Sherman
- Cinematography: Harry Neumann
- Production company: Universal Pictures
- Distributed by: Universal Pictures
- Release date: July 18, 1925
- Running time: 50 minutes
- Country: United States
- Languages: Silent; English intertitles

Don Dare-Devil is a 1925 American silent Western film directed by Clifford Smith and written by Wyndham Gittens. The film stars Jack Hoxie, Cathleen Calhoun, Duke R. Lee, William Welsh, Thomas G. Lingham, and Evelyn Sherman. The film was released on July 18, 1925, by Universal Pictures.

== Plot ==
As described in a film magazine review, Jack Bannister goes to South America to take over property left by his Spanish mother. Benito Menocal, a former pal, is killed by Bud Latham, an American bad man. Jack goes after him and finds Latham trailing Ynez and her father José Remado. Jack sides with them, eventually running Latham into the ground, saving the young woman and her father, which ends romantically.

== Cast ==
- Jack Hoxie as Jack Bannister
- Cathleen Calhoun as Ynez Remado
- Duke R. Lee as Bud Latham
- William Welsh as José Remado
- Thomas G. Lingham as Felipe Berengo
- Evelyn Sherman as Señora Berengo
- William Steele as Benito Menocal
- Cesare Gravina as Esteban Salazar
- Tom Grimes as Texas
- Demetrius Alexis as Parader

== Preservation ==
With no holdings located in archives, Don Dare Devil is considered a lost film.
