= The Galloping Ace =

1924 film

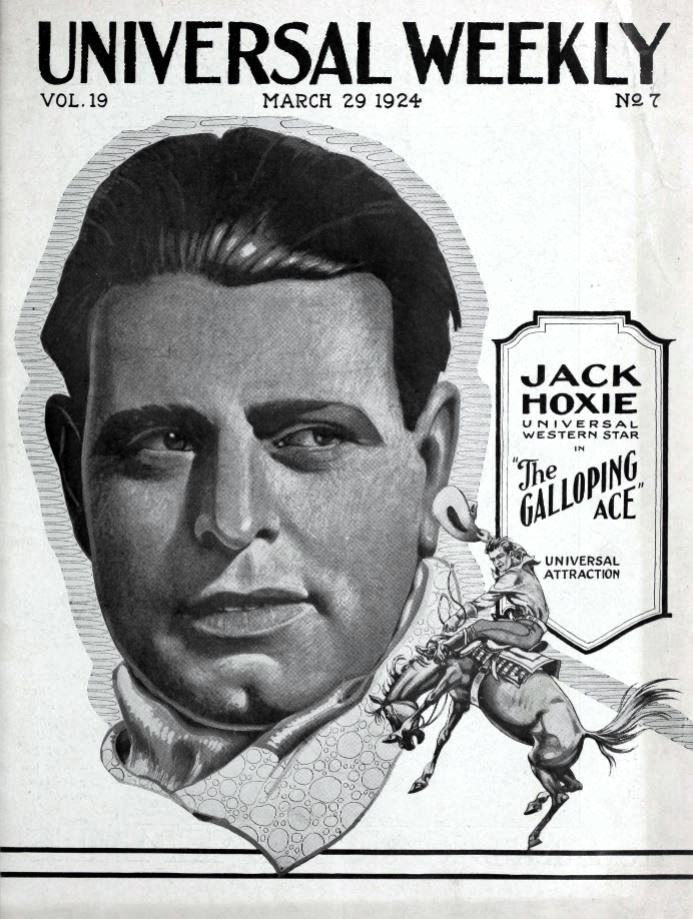
- Cover of magazine
- Directed by: Robert N. Bradbury
- Screenplay by: Isadore Bernstein
- Story by: Jacques Jaccard
- Starring: Jack Hoxie; Margaret Morris; Robert McKim; Frank Rice; Julia Brown; Dorothea Wolbert
- Cinematography: Merritt B. Gerstad
- Production company: Universal Pictures
- Distributed by: Universal Pictures
- Release date: March 31, 1924
- Running time: 50 minutes
- Country: United States
- Language: Silent (English intertitles)

The Galloping Ace is a 1924 American silent Western film directed by Robert N. Bradbury and written by Isadore Bernstein. The film stars Jack Hoxie, Margaret Morris, Robert McKim, Frank Rice, Julia Brown, and Dorothea Wolbert. The film was released on March 31, 1924, by Universal Pictures.

== Plot ==
As described in a film magazine review, Jim Jordan, an ex-cowboy and service man, obtains a job on Anne Morse's ranch where his buddy, Zack Williams, is working. Kincaid, owner of an adjoining quarry, plots to get possession of the Morse land, which contains valuable black marble deposits. Failing to foreclose an illegal mortgage, Kincaid attempts to take the land by force. Jordan and Williams' fight off Kincaid's men with dynamite. Kincaid's schemes are defeated and Jordan weds Anne.

== Cast ==
- Jack Hoxie as Jim Jordan
- Margaret Morris as Anne Morse
- Robert McKim as David Kincaid
- Frank Rice as Knack Williams
- Julia Brown as Louise Williams
- Dorothea Wolbert as Susie Williams
- Fred Humes as Fred

== Preservation ==
With no holdings located in archives, The Galloping Ace is considered a lost film.
