= The Sagebrush Lady =

1925 film

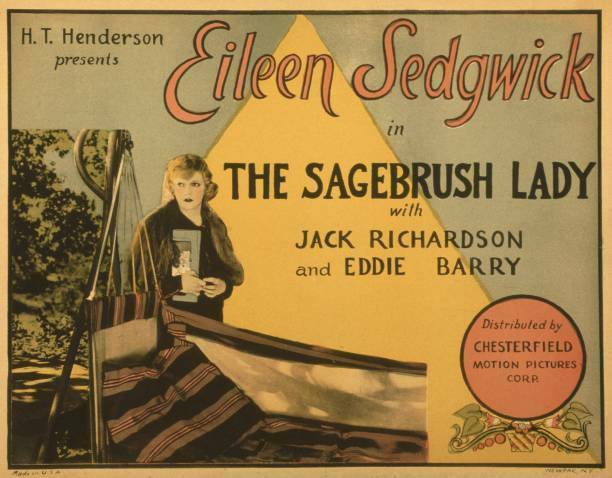
- Lobby card
- Directed by: Horace B. Carpenter
- Written by: Carle Cooly
- Produced by: Theodore Henderson
- Starring: Eileen Sedgwick; Ben Corbett; Jack Richardson
- Production company: Chesterfield Pictures
- Distributed by: Chesterfield Pictures
- Release date: October 1, 1925
- Running time: 50 minutes
- Country: United States
- Language: Silent (English intertitles)

The Sagebrush Lady is a 1925 American silent Western film directed by Horace B. Carpenter and starring Eileen Sedgwick, Ben Corbett, and Jack Richardson.

== Plot ==
As described in a film magazine review, Harmony Hayden, a government agent, arrives in the area in disguise to check the operation of cattle rustlers around Paula Loring's ranch. His identity is not suspected by the local people. Neighboring rancherman Tom Doyle schemes to marry Paula. The young woman saves Harmony from being lynched after being suspected of being a holdup man after he said that he was her fiance. Tom Doyle's foreman is foiled by Harmony in an attempt to kidnap Paula. Having broken up the gang, Harmony remains after becoming Paula's husband.

== Cast ==
- Eileen Sedgwick as Paula Loring
- Ben Corbett as Doyle's Foreman
- Jack Richardson as Tom Doyle
- Eddie Barry as Harmony Hayden
- William Steele as Sheriff Martin

== Bibliography ==
- Connelly, Robert B. The Silents: Silent Feature Films, 1910-36, Volume 40, Issue 2. December Press, 1998.
- Munden, Kenneth White. The American Film Institute Catalog of Motion Pictures Produced in the United States, Part 1. University of California Press, 1997.
