= The Riddle Rider =

1924 film

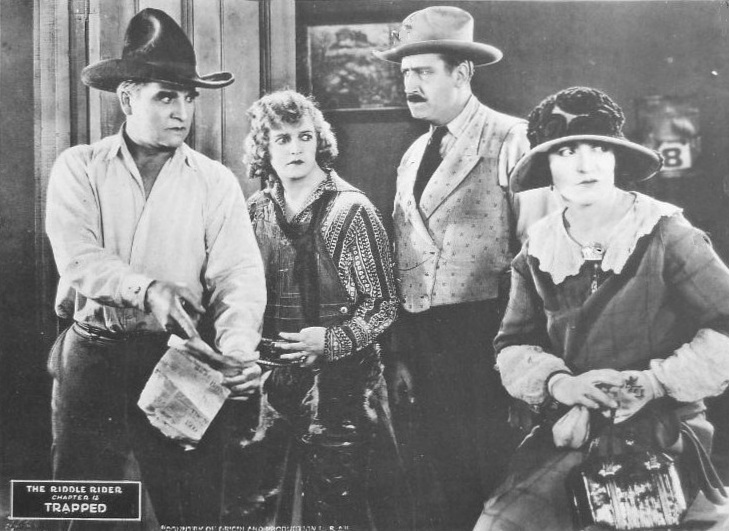
- Lobby card for Chapter 12
- Directed by: William James Craft
- Written by: Arthur Henry Gooden; George W. Pyper; William E. Wing
- Starring: William Desmond; Eileen Sedgwick
- Distributed by: Universal Pictures
- Release date: November 23, 1924
- Running time: 15 episodes
- Country: United States
- Languages: Silent; English intertitles

The Riddle Rider is a 1924 American silent Western film serial directed by William James Craft starring William Desmond and Eileen Sedgwick. The film is considered to be lost. The 1927 serial The Return of the Riddle Rider is a sequel.

== Cast ==
- William Desmond as Randolph Parker / The Riddle Rider
- Eileen Sedgwick as Nan Madden
- Helen Holmes as Julie Dean
- Claude Payton as Victor Raymond
- William Gould as Jack Archer (credited as Wililam H. Gould)
- Ben Corbett as Monte Blade
- Hughie Mack as Willie
- Albert J. Smith
- Margaret Royce
- Artie Ortego
- Yakima Canutt

== Chapters ==
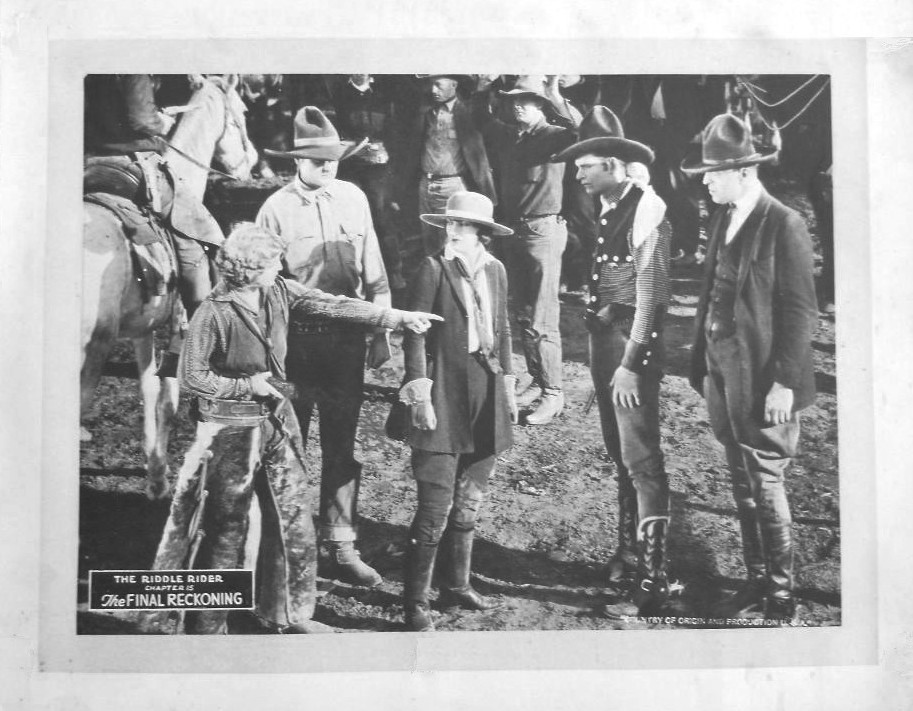
Lobby card for Chapter 15

1. The Canyon Torrent
2. Crashing Doom
3. In the Path of Death
4. Plunged Into the Depths
5. Race for a Fortune
6. Sinister Shadows
7. The Swindle
8. The Frame-Up
9. False Faces
10. At the Brink of Death
11. Thundering Steeds
12. Trapped
13. The Valley of Fate
14. The Deadline
15. The Final Reckoning

== See also ==
- List of film serials
- List of film serials by studio
