= Duke R. Lee =

American actor

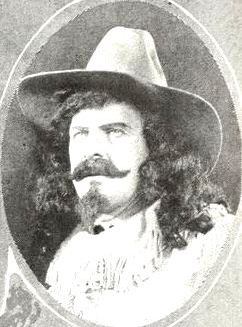
- Lee in In the Days of Buffalo Bill (1922)
- Born: May 13, 1881; Prince Henry County, Virginia
- Died: April 1, 1959 (aged 77); Los Angeles, California
- Occupation: Actor
- Years active: 1913–1946

Duke R. Lee (May 13, 1881 – April 1, 1959) was an American actor.

Lee's career began when he performed in Buffalo Bill's Wild West Show, and he later played Buffalo Bill on film. He appeared in more than 90 films between 1913 and 1946. In the mid-1910s, he had a vaudeville company, The Duke R. Lee Road Show, that played throughout the western United States.

In 1935, Lee was announcer and master of ceremonies for Tom Mix's traveling show. He also had a radio program that was broadcast on NBC and CBS.

He was born in Virginia and died in Los Angeles, California.

== Selected filmography ==
- The Soul Herder (1917)
- Straight Shooting (1917)
- The Savage (1917)
- Hell Bent (1918)
- The Lure of the Circus (1918)
- The Fighting Brothers (1919)
- The Gun Packer (1919)
- By Indian Post (1919)
- The Outcasts of Poker Flat (1919)
- Ace of the Saddle (1919)
- The Face in the Watch (1919)
- Rider of the Law (1919)
- A Gun Fightin' Gentleman (1919)
- 'If Only' Jim (1920)
- Hitchin' Posts (1920)
- Just Pals (1920)
- Vanishing Trails (1920)
- Sundown Slim (1920)
- The Cactus Kid (1921)
- The White Horseman (1921)
- Trailin' (1921)
- In the Days of Buffalo Bill (1922)
- Just Tony (1922)
- Tracked to Earth (1922)
- Don't Shoot (1922)
- The Oregon Trail (1923)
- In the Days of Daniel Boone (1923)
- The Gaiety Girl (1924)
- Fighting Fury (1924)
- Roaring Rails (1924)
- The Western Wallop (1924)
- Flying Hoofs (1925)
- Don Dare Devil (1925)
- The White Outlaw (1925)
- Sky High Corral (1926)
- Rustlers' Ranch (1926)
- The Man in the Saddle (1926)
- Outlaws of Red River (1927)
- The Circus Ace (1927)
- The Terror of Bar X (1927)
- Galloping Fury (1927)
- The Heart of Broadway (1928)
- The Big Hop (1928)
- Crashing Through (1928)
- Son of the Golden West (1928)
- Clearing the Trail (1928)
- .45 Calibre War (1929)
- Headin' for Trouble (1931)
- The Fighting Gentleman (1932)
- The Gambling Sex (1932)
- The Scarlet Brand (1932)
- The Texan (1932)
- Five Bad Men (1935)
- Desert Guns (1936)
- Adventures of Texas Jack (1934)
- Overland Stage Raiders (1938)
- Santa Fe Stampede (1938)
- Stagecoach (1939) as Lordsburg Sheriff (uncredited)
