= Margaret Morris (actress) =

American actress (1898–1968)

Margaret Emma Morris
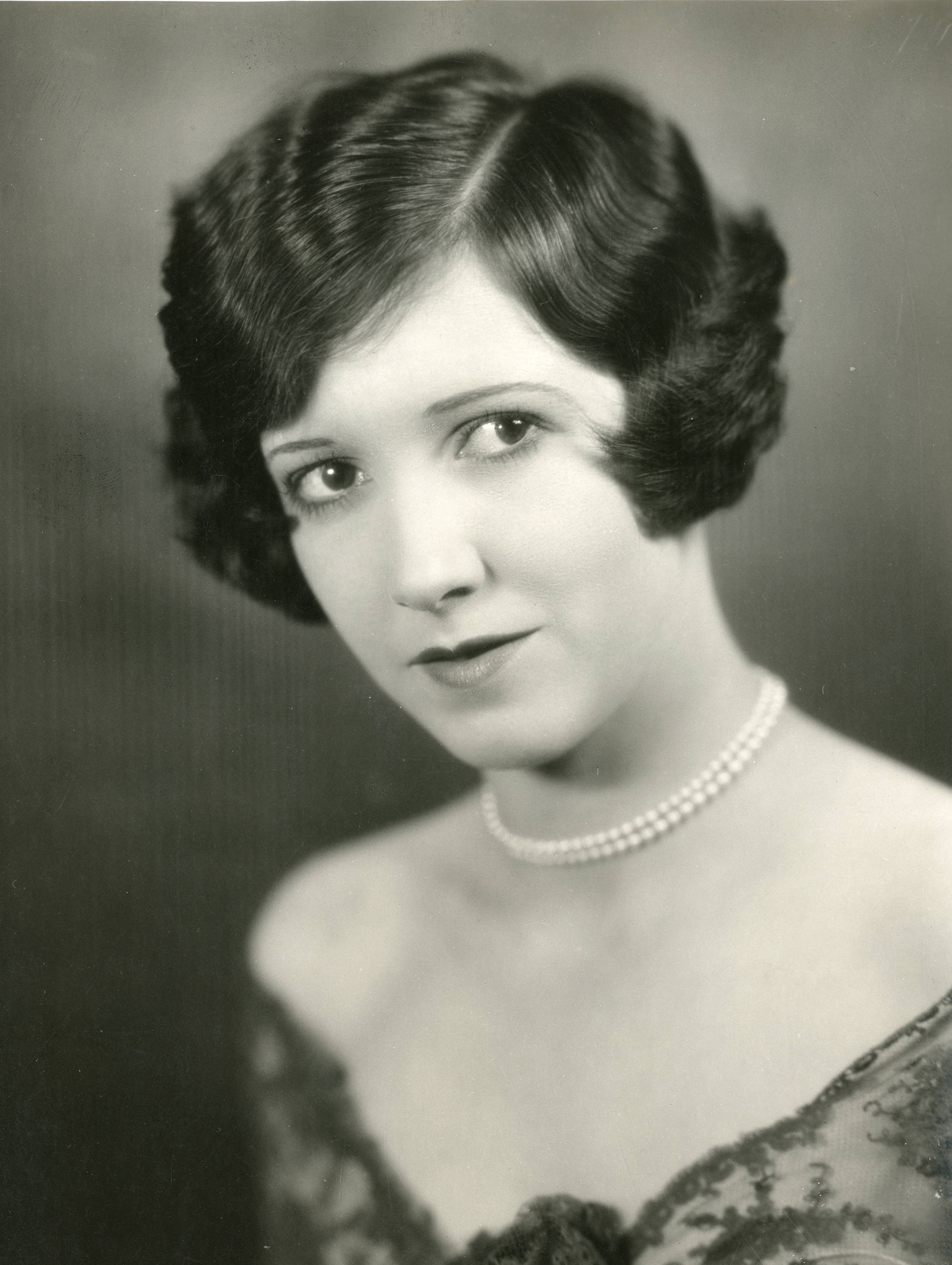
- Morris in Photoplay (1926)
- Born: November 7, 1898; Minneapolis, Minnesota, U.S.
- Died: June 7, 1968 (aged 69); Los Angeles, California, U.S.
- Occupation: Actress
- Years active: 1920 - 1937

Margaret Morris (November 7, 1898 – June 7, 1968) was an American Broadway stage and film actress.

== Early years ==
Morris, born in Minneapolis, Minnesota, was the great-niece to former US President Benjamin Harrison. She moved to New York as a teenager and caught the eye of Florenz Ziegfeld, Jr. Family members claimed Ziegfeld discovered her while she was dancing on a New York City street corner.

== Career ==
Morris performed in the Ziegfeld Follies in 1912, 1913, and 1920, with the 1912 appearance being her Broadway debut. Her other work on Broadway included Miss 1917 (1917), The Maid of the Mountains (1918), Morris Gest's "Midnight Whirl" (1919), The Blushing Bride (1922), The Yankee Princess (1922), Wildflower (1923), Dew Drop Inn (1923), Sweet Little Devil (1924), Madame Pompadour (1924), and The City Chap (1925).

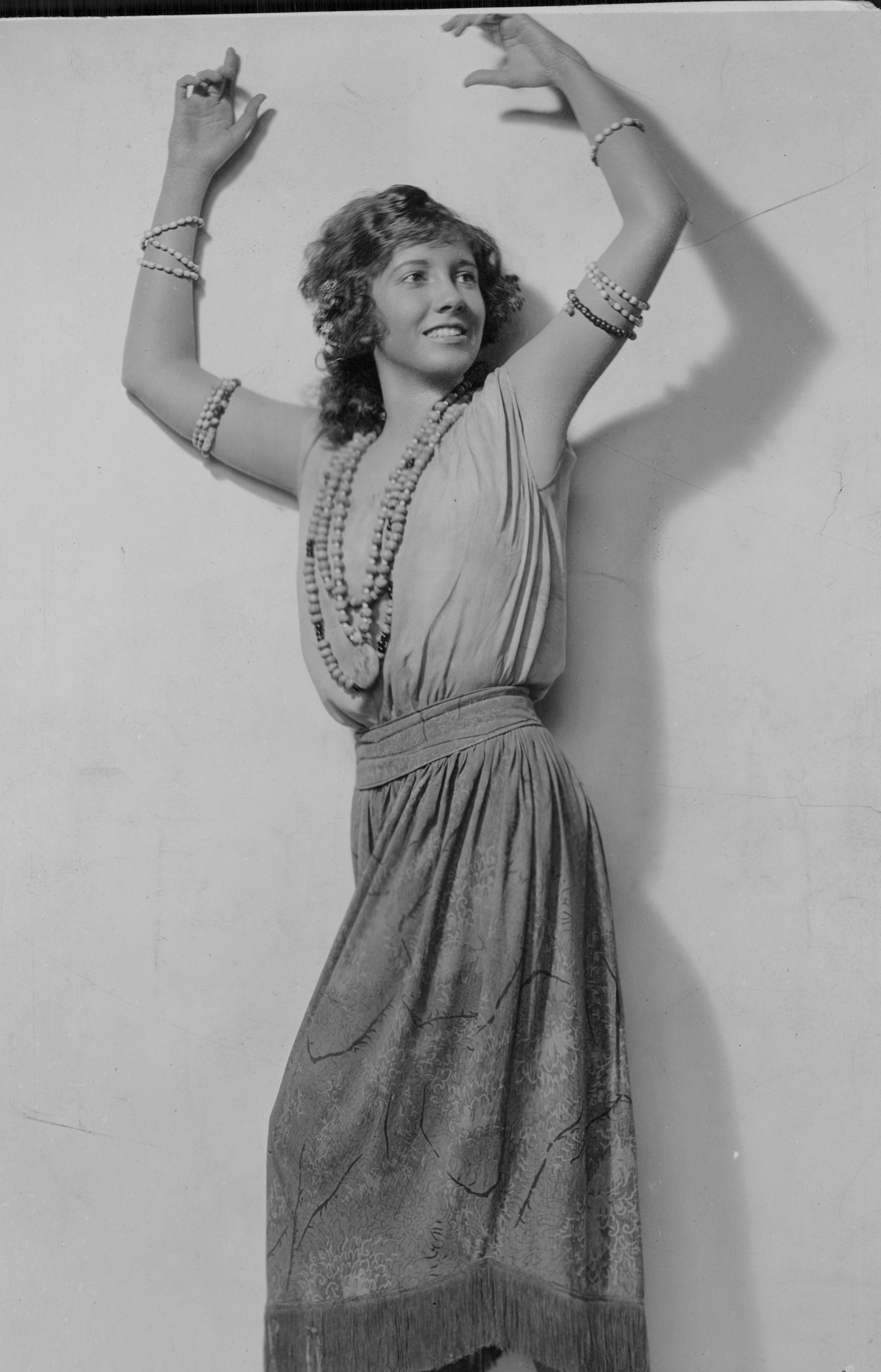
Margaret Morris in The Ghost City (1923)

At 22, Morris starred in her first film, the 1920 movie Her First Elopement. Her career went on a fast track from there, with her starring in eleven films through 1924, which included the 1923 film The Ghost City opposite Pete Morrison, and The Galloping Ace opposite Jack Hoxie in 1924.

Also in 1924, she was one of thirteen girls selected as "WAMPAS Baby Stars", a list that included future Hollywood legend Clara Bow and Elinor Fair. She starred in another twenty eight films through 1929, and was at the height of her career. However, like many early film stars, she did not transition well with the advent of sound films. In 1932 she starred opposite Tom Tyler in Single-Handed Sanders, a western. She had several B-movie roles, mostly uncredited, from 1932 to 1937. Her last film was The Toast of New York, an uncredited role, in 1937.

== Personal ==
On March 19, 1943, Morris married John Cecil Brady (1895-1956).

== Later years and death ==
Morris died in Los Angeles on June 7, 1968, aged 69.

== Partial filmography ==
- Her First Elopement (1920)
- Hickville to Broadway (1921)
- The Town Scandal (1923)
- Beasts of Paradise (1923)
- The Ghost City (1923)
- The Iron Man (1924)
- The Galloping Ace (1924)
- Welcome Home (1925)
- Wild Horse Mesa (1925) - Sosie
- The Best People (1925)
- Womanhandled (1925)
- Youth's Gamble (1925)
- That's My Baby (1926)
- Born to the West (1926)
- Enemies of Society (1927)
- The Magic Garden (1927)
- Mark of the Frog (1928)
- The Avenging Shadow (1928)
- The Woman I Love (1929)
- Single-Handed Sanders (1932)
- Desert Guns (1936)
- The Toast of New York (1937)
