= The Return of the Riddle Rider =

1927 film

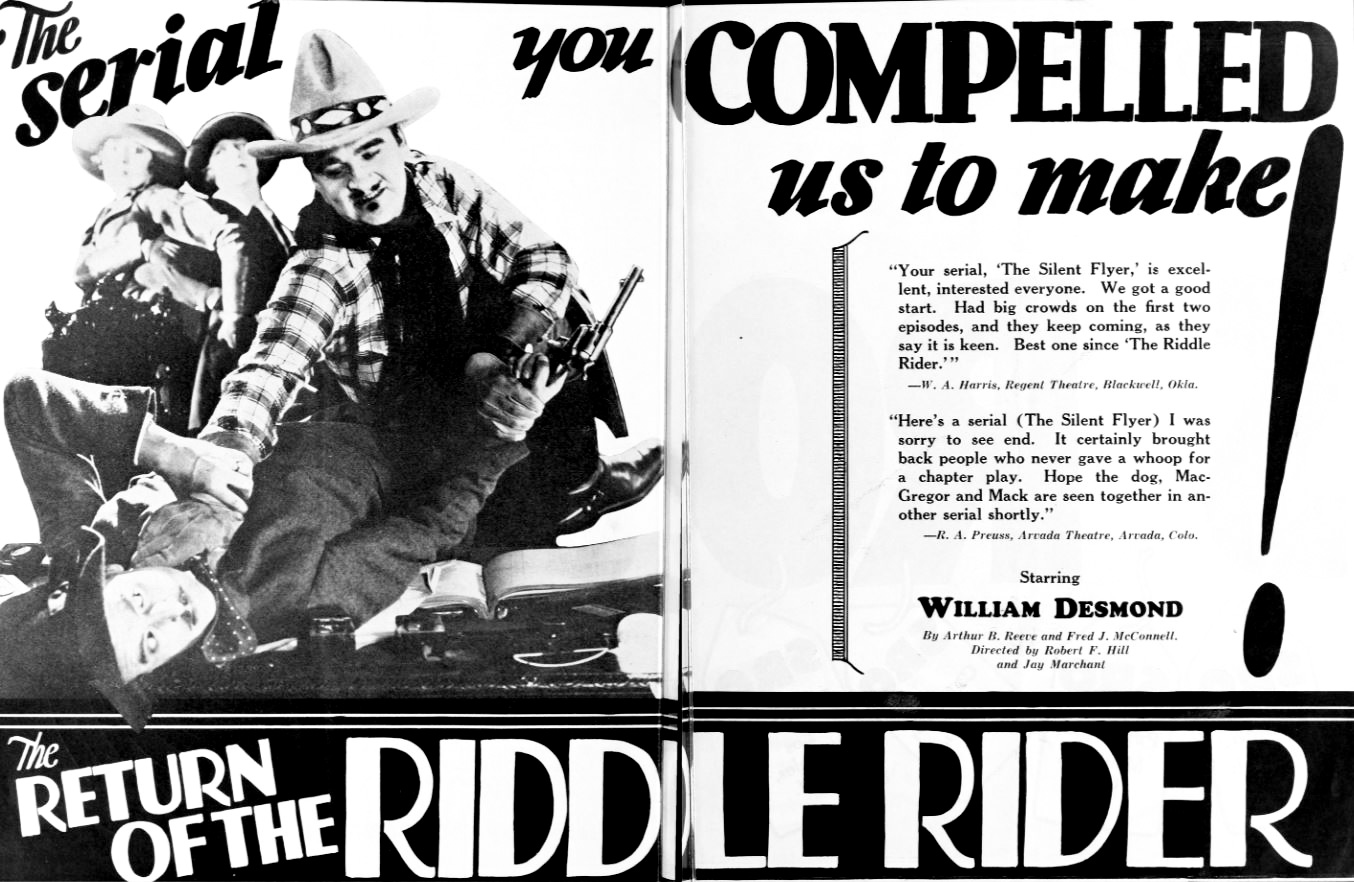
- Advertisement
- Directed by: Robert F. Hill
- Written by: Fred McConnell; Arthur B. Reeve
- Starring: William Desmond; Lola Todd
- Distributed by: Universal Pictures
- Release date: March 28, 1927
- Running time: 10 episodes
- Country: United States
- Language: Silent (English intertitles)

The Return of the Riddle Rider is a 1927 American silent Western film serial directed by Robert F. Hill. It is a sequel to The Riddle Rider (1924) which also starred William Desmond in the lead role. The film is considered to be lost.

== Cast ==
- William Desmond as Randolph Parker / The Riddle Rider
- Lola Todd as Madge McCormack
- Grace Cunard as Vilda Dixon
- Tom London as Buck White
- Henry A. Barrows as Senator McCormack
- Scotty Mattraw as Willie
- Lewis Dayton as James Thornley
- Norbert A. Myles as James Archer
- Howard Davies as Hank Wilson

== Chapter titles ==
1. The Riddle Rider Rides Again
2. A Day of Terror
3. Not a Chance
4. The Hold-Up
5. The River of Flame
6. The Trap
7. The Crooked Deal
8. The Rock Slide
9. The Silencer
10. Vengeance

== See also ==
- List of film serials
- List of film serials by studio
