= Lola Todd =

American actress (1904–1995)

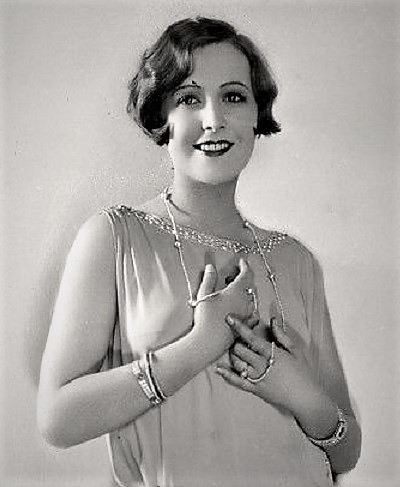
- Todd in the 1920s
- Born: May 14, 1904; New York City, U.S.
- Died: July 31, 1995 (aged 91); Los Angeles, California, U.S.
- Occupation: Actress
- Years active: 1923 - 1929

Lola Todd (May 14, 1904 – July 31, 1995) was an American film actress in the early years of Hollywood's silent film era.

== Biography ==
Todd was born in New York City in 1904, the daughter of Eugene Parker Todd and Minnie Todd. Before Todd became an actress, she was assistant designer for the Ziegfeld Follies. She used those skills to design her costumes for her roles in films.

She moved to Hollywood in the early 1920s to pursue film acting. She received her first role in the 1923 film The Ghost City, followed by Rustlin' Buster that same year, opposite Jack Mower. In 1924 her career briefly took off, and she would star in nine films that year. In 1925 she would have roles in only three films, but would be one of thirteen girls selected to be "WAMPAS Baby Stars", a list which included future Hollywood star Clara Bow, as well as actress June Marlowe.

She would star in five films the following year, and four in 1927, but afterward her career would slow considerably. In 1928 and 1929 combined she would have roles in only three films, and with the advent of "talking films" her career ended promptly.

Some of Todd's film work was in serials, including The Iron Man (1924), The Scarlet Streak (1926), and The Return of the Riddle Rider (1927).

When sound films began to replace silent films, Todd left acting and became a secretary. She later retired in Los Angeles, where she resided until her death on July 31, 1995, aged 91.

== Selected filmography ==
- The Ghost City (1923)
- Dark Stairways (1924)
- The Iron Man (1924)
- Captain John Smith and Pocahontas (1924) - Pocahontas
- The Scarlet Streak (1925)
- The Fighting Peacemaker (1926)
- The Tough Guy (1926)
- The Demon (1926)
- The Bells (1926)
- Remember (1926 film)
- The Return of the Riddle Rider (1927)
- The War Horse (1927)
- Red Clay (1927)
- The Harvester (1927)
- Wallflowers (1928)
- Taking a Chance (1928)
