= Straight Through =

1925 film

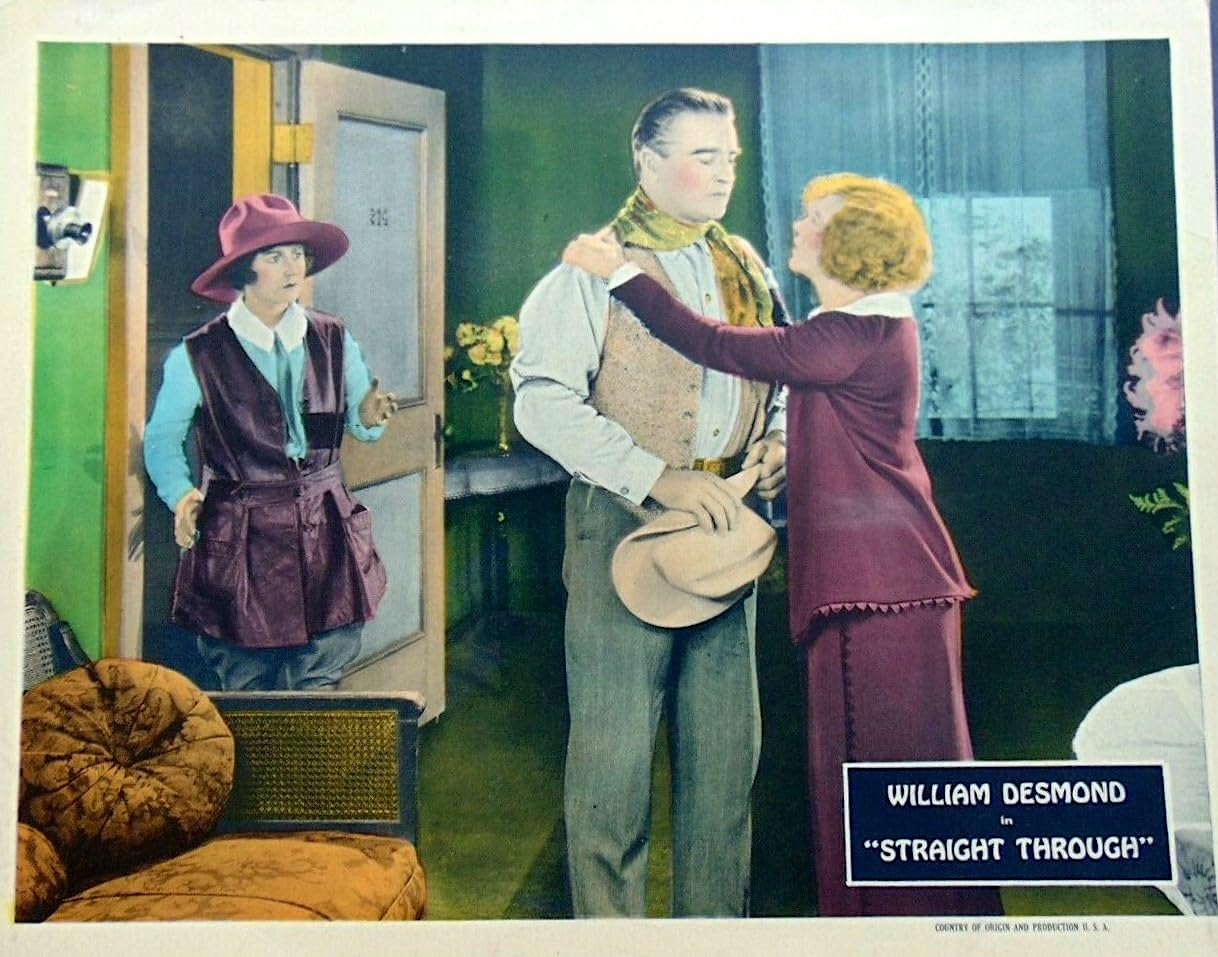
- Lobby card
- Directed by: Arthur Rosson
- Written by: Charles Logue
- Starring: William Desmond; Marguerite Clayton; Albert J. Smith
- Cinematography: Jackson Rose
- Production company: Universal Pictures
- Distributed by: Universal Pictures
- Release date: April 5, 1925
- Country: United States
- Languages: Silent; English intertitles

Straight Through is a 1925 American silent Western film directed by Arthur Rosson and starring William Desmond, Marguerite Clayton and Albert J. Smith.

== Cast ==
- William Desmond as Good Deed O'Day
- Marguerite Clayton as Denver Nell
- Albert J. Smith as Granger
- Ruth Stonehouse as Mary Snowden
- Frank Brownlee as Bill Higgins
- William Gillis as Sheriff
- George F. Marion as Parson Sanderson

== Preservation ==
With no holdings located in archives, Straight Through is considered a lost film.

== Bibliography ==
- Munden, Kenneth White. The American Film Institute Catalog of Motion Pictures Produced in the United States, Part 1. University of California Press, 1997.
