= Slim Cole =

American actor (born 1892)

- Born: Nathan Cole Hebert; May 6, 1892; St. Louis, Missouri, U.S.
- Other names: King Cole
- Occupation(s): Actor, stuntman
- Years active: 1915–1932
- Spouse: Katherine Fay (m. 1915-1921)
- Family: Nathan Cole (grandfather)

Nathan Cole Hebert (born May 6, 1892, date of death unknown), known as Slim Cole and sometimes credited as King Cole, was an American actor and stuntman who appeared in a string of B-movie westerns during Hollywood's silent era.

== Biography ==
=== Early years ===
Slim was born in St. Louis, Missouri, to Joseph Hebert and Hallie Cole. His mother's father, Nathan Cole, was once mayor of St. Louis. Joseph Hebert, Slim's father, died when Slim was a toddler, and he was raised by his mother in the Los Angeles area.

=== Career as a forest ranger ===
While working as a forest ranger in the San Bernardino Mountains, he learned how to ride a motorcycle, a skill that would serve him well when he entered the motion picture industry around 1915. "They laughed at me when I started patrolling the forests on motorcycle, but after I got the knack for following old trails and making new ones, I showed them that I could cover as much territory as four rangers on mounted horses."

=== Career in Hollywood ===
After being spotted by a motion picture director, Slim was soon in demand for his willingness to perform all sorts of death-defying stunts. He often worked with fellow stunt performer and actress Grace Cunard. Early on, he was employed by Charlie Chaplin's studio.

In 1922, he briefly returned to St. Louis with the ambition of starting a motion picture industry in his hometown. He also aimed to give his body a rest after years of being roughed up on the job. "I'm getting too old for the business," he told a reporter with The St. Louis Post Dispatch. "I'm only 29, but I've been through a lot, and I don't have to wait for a psychic hunch."

He did continue to act, but his roles got smaller and smaller until he was pretty much only landing bit parts.

=== Personal life ===
Cole married Katherine Fay in 1915; the couple divorced in 1921. After his last film was released in 1932, it's unknown what happened to Cole.

== Partial filmography ==
- His Day Out (1918)
- A Dog's Life (1918)
- Shoulder Arms (1918)
- Smashing Barriers (1919)
- Where Is This West? (1923)
- Beasts of Paradise (1923)
- The Ghost City (1923)
- Reckless Speed (1924)
- Ridin' Pretty (1925)
- The Great Circus Mystery (1925)
- The Fighting Ranger (1925)
- Prowlers of the Night (1926)
- Desert Dust (1927)
- The Texas Bad Man (1932)
- The Last Frontier (1932)
- Gold (1932)
