= The War Horse =

1927 film

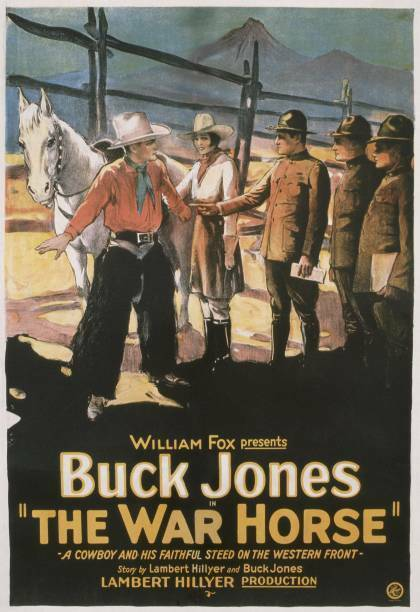
- Directed by: Lambert Hillyer
- Screenplay by: Lambert Hillyer
- Story by: Lambert Hillyer; Buck Jones
- Starring: Buck Jones; Lola Todd; Lloyd Whitlock; Stanley Taylor; Yola d'Avril; James Gordon
- Cinematography: Reginald Lyons
- Production company: Fox Film Corporation
- Distributed by: Fox Film Corporation
- Release date: February 6, 1927
- Running time: 50 minutes
- Country: United States
- Language: English

The War Horse is a 1927 American drama film written and directed by Lambert Hillyer and starring Buck Jones, Lola Todd, Lloyd Whitlock, Stanley Taylor, Yola d'Avril and James Gordon. It was released on February 6, 1927, by Fox Film Corporation.

== Cast ==
- Buck Jones as Buck Thomas
- Lola Todd as Audrey Evans
- Lloyd Whitlock as Captain Collins
- Stanley Taylor as Lieutenant Caldwell
- Yola d'Avril as Yvonne
- James Gordon as General Evans
