= Gladys Roy =

American actress

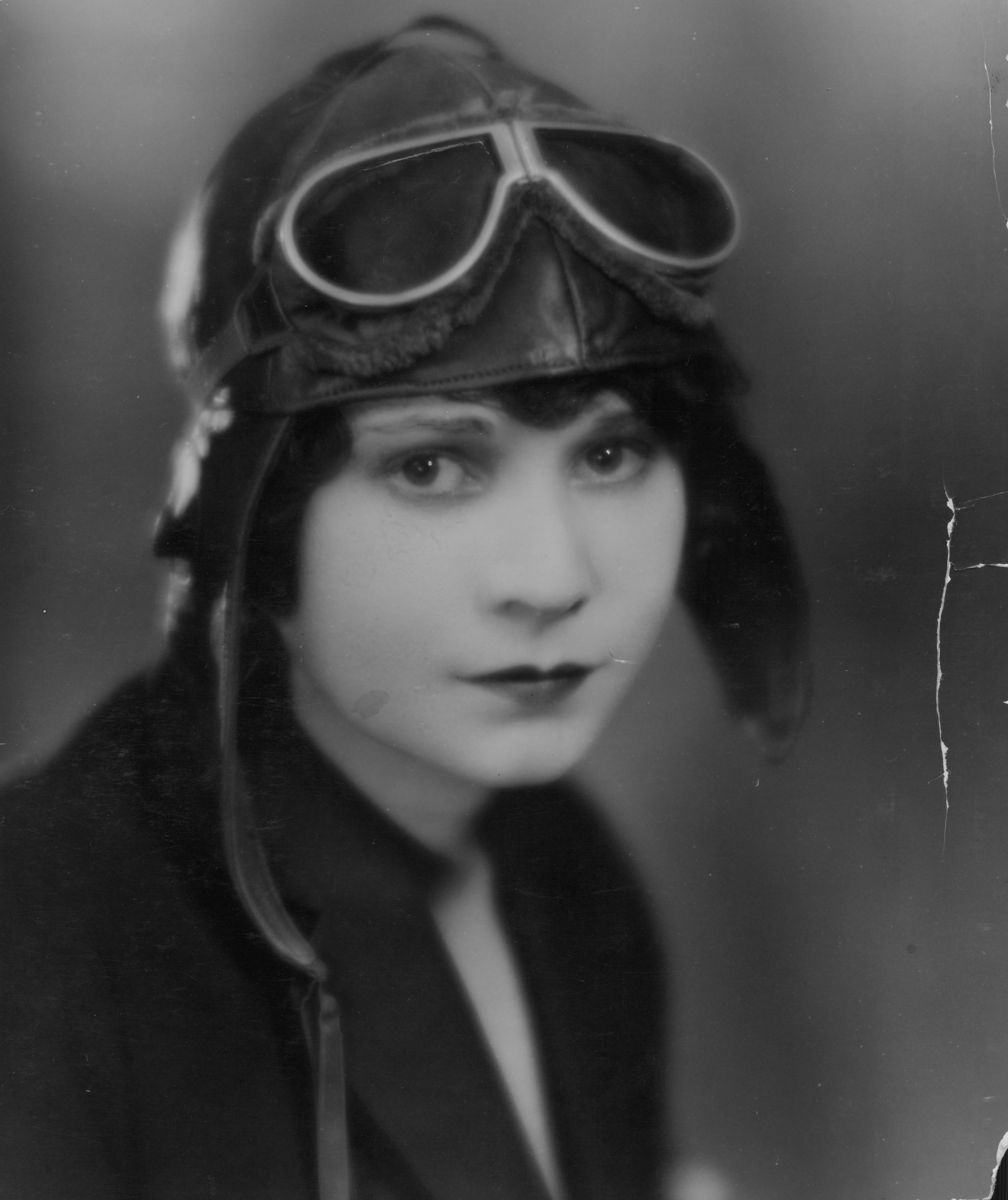
- Roy as She Looked in 'The Fighting Ranger', 1925
- Born: Gladys Smith; 1896; Kentucky
- Died: August 15, 1927 (aged 30–31); Ohio
- Cause of death: Airplane accident
- Resting place: Lakewood Cemetery, Minneapolis

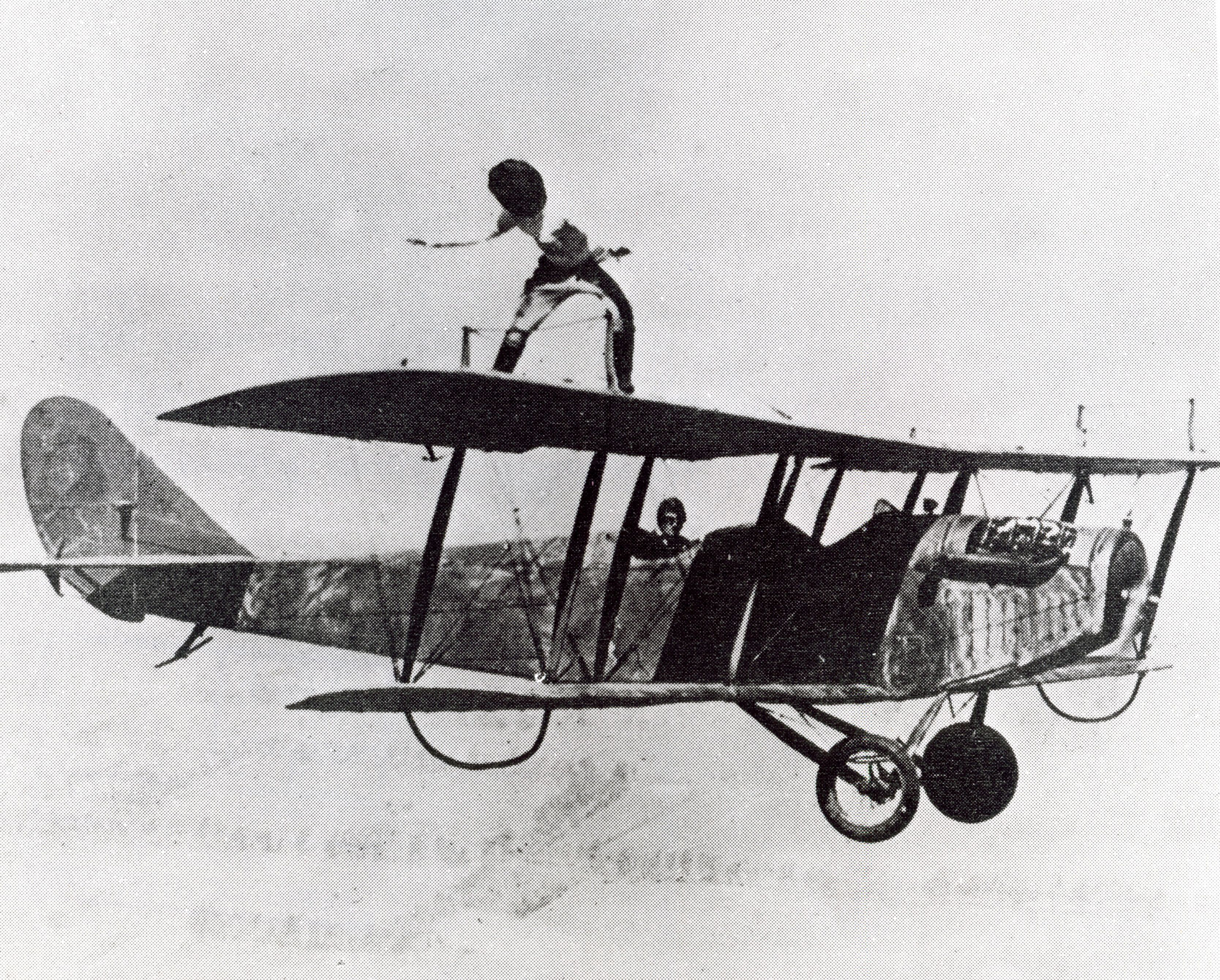
Roy wing walking blindfolded above Los Angeles (1924)

Gladys Roy (1896 – August 15, 1927) was an American wing walker, barnstormer and film actress.

== Early life ==
Gladys Smith was born in 1896 in Kentucky to Myra (née Voorhees) and Charles Byron Smith. Some sources incorrectly put her date of birth at 1902 or 1904, although her gravestone states 1896. Some sources suggest she was born in Minneapolis. She had two sisters, Viola and Grace and three brothers, Robert "Lee", Charles "Les," and Chadwick "Chad" Smith, who were also well-known pilots, flying with Northwest Airlines and all inducted into the Minnesota Aviation Hall of Fame. She married Arthur J. Roy and performed under the name Gladys Roy.

== Aviation career ==
She was a barnstormer or aerial aviation performer in the 1920s in Minnesota and California areas. She started in 1921 as a parachute jumper, later becoming a wing walker. She was more famous for conducting a variety of stunts on the upper wings of a flying airplane, including playing tennis with Ivan Unger in 1925, walking blindfolded across the wings, and dancing the Charleston. She claimed to hold the world record for a low parachute jump, and completed a parachute jump from 17,000 feet. She was earning $200 to $500 per performance around 1924, with her earnings dropping in 1926 to $100 a performance. In May 1926, she told the Los Angeles Times, "Of late the crowds are beginning to tire of even my most difficult stunts and so I must necessarily invent new ones, that is, I want to hold my reputation as a dare-devil. Eventually an accident will occur..."

Her agent was the Western Vaudeville Managers' Association, booking her in fairs across the west of the United States. Roy did stunt work for the Lord Motor Car Company, along with exhibition work for various real estate exhibitions and auctions including John P. Mills Real estate. Roy appeared in the 1925 film, The Fighting Ranger, but was seriously injured when she was thrown from a horse during production.

Roy died in Ohio on August 15, 1927, when she accidentally walked into a spinning propeller of a parked aircraft. She had been posing for pictures in an airplane with a local "bathing beauty" contestant. At the time of her death she had been planning a flight from New York to Rome with Lt. Delmar Snyder.
