= When Danger Calls =

1927 film

- Directed by: Charles Hutchison
- Written by: Ben Allah
- Produced by: Samuel Sax; Samuel Bischoff
- Starring: William Fairbanks; Eileen Sedgwick; Ethan Laidlaw
- Cinematography: William Rees
- Production company: Camera Pictures
- Distributed by: Lumas Film Corporation
- Release date: September 23, 1927
- Running time: 50 minutes
- Country: United States
- Languages: Silent; English intertitles

When Danger Calls is a 1927 American silent thriller film directed by Charles Hutchison and starring William Fairbanks, Eileen Sedgwick and Ethan Laidlaw.

== Cast ==
- William Fairbanks as Ralph Spencer
- Eileen Sedgwick as June Weldon
- Ethan Laidlaw as James Gwyn
- Sally Long as Eva Gwyn
- Donald MacDonald as George Marsden
- Hank Mann as Tommy Schultz

== Bibliography ==
- Munden, Kenneth White. The American Film Institute Catalog of Motion Pictures Produced in the United States, Part 1. University of California Press, 1997.
