= Lure of the West =

1926 American silent Western film

- Directed by: Alan James
- Written by: Alan James
- Produced by: H.T. Henderson
- Starring: Eileen Sedgwick
- Production company: Chesterfield Pictures
- Distributed by: Chesterfield Pictures
- Release date: November 1926
- Country: United States
- Languages: Silent; English intertitles

Lure of the West is a 1926 American silent Western film starring Eileen Sedgwick. Directed by Alan James.

== Cast ==
- Eileen Sedgwick
- Les Bates
- Ray Childs
- Dutch Maley
- Alfred Hewston
- Elsie Bower
- Karl Silvera
