= Beyond All Odds =

1926 film

- Directed by: Alan James
- Written by: Alan James
- Produced by: Theodore Henderson
- Starring: Eileen Sedgwick
- Production company: Chesterfield Pictures
- Distributed by: Chesterfield Pictures
- Release date: June 15, 1926
- Running time: 5 reels
- Country: United States
- Languages: Silent; English intertitles

Beyond All Odds is a 1926 American silent Western film directed by Alan James and starring Eileen Sedgwick.

== Plot ==
Betty Mason seeks revenge in the murder of her brother, Dan, as well as the kidnapping of her finance.

"Girl avenges death of brother and abduction of sweetheart by killing villains instrumental in causing both crimes." -- Motion Picture News Booking Guide, 1926

== Cast ==
- Eileen Sedgwick as Betty Mason
- Karl Silvera as George Baker
- Ray Childs as Casino Joe
- Theodore Henderson as Dan Mason
- Les Bates as Ritch Walker
- Lew Meehan as Cory Forbes
- Alfred Hewston as Sheriff
- Dutch Maley as Hard Rock Jordan

== Themes ==
Unlike many classic Westerns, especially of the silent era, this film displays the female lead as the hero, who avenges both the death of her brother and the kidnapping of her finance by killing those responsible for both crimes.
