= Just Pals =

1920 film directed by John Ford

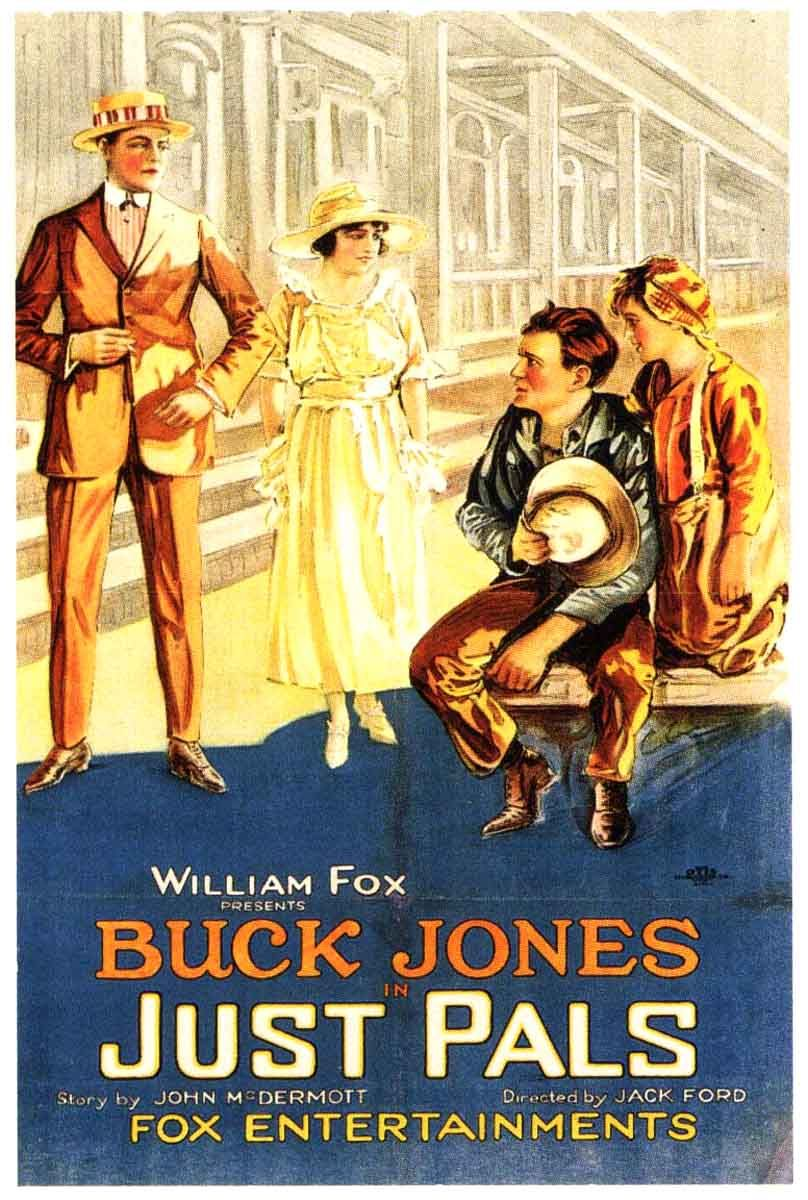
- Theatrical poster for Just Pals (1920)
- Directed by: John Ford
- Written by: John McDermott; Paul Schofield
- Produced by: William Fox
- Starring: Buck Jones
- Cinematography: George Schneiderman
- Distributed by: Fox Film Corporation
- Release date: October 21, 1920
- Running time: 50 minutes
- Country: United States
- Languages: Silent; English intertitles

Just Pals is a 1920 American silent Western film directed by John Ford, and was Ford's first film for Fox Film Corporation. John Ford is credited as 'Jack Ford', as was typical for his earliest films.

The film introduces the theme of the partnership between two vagabonds, a young man and a boy, who support and help each other. Buck Jones and Georgie Stone already anticipates some of the elements that will contribute to the extraordinary success of Charles Chaplin and Jackie Coogan in The Kid (1921). The sheriff in the film, played by Duke R. Lee, keeps saying five times in the film, "The law'll take care o' this!".

== Plot ==
Just Pals

The town bum, Bim, rescues Bill, thrown off a train by brakeman. Bim gives Bill a bath and promises Mary to take Bim to school. Bill steals a uniform so Bim can get a job but gets hurt jumping off the train. Bim takes him to the town Doctor where his wife discovers Bill may be a runaway with a reward. They plot to keep Bill away from Bim. Mary is wooed by Harvey Cahill. Next, the townspeople come to her for the memorial fund and she gives Bim a note to get the fund from Harvey. Mary supposedly sees a boy drowning some kittens and faints. Bim sees Mary being carried to the doctor, reads the note and confronts Harvey who gives him the money he has stolen. The town sheriff opens the safe to find the money missing. Bim is arrested for returning the money but escapes with Bill. Bim and Bill meet up with outlaws planning to rob the town bank. Bim tries to stop them but the outlaws tie them up. Nearby a car roars down a hill, the driver is thrown out. A boy comes out, frees them and they pursue the outlaws into town. Bim catches them robbing the bank, the towns people catch them. Outlaw claims Bim is one of them and Bim is tied up. Harvey attempts to escape with Mary while Bill tells the sheriff he is the real villain. A rich man appears claiming to be Bill's father but upon seeing him says he isn't. The boy from the car turns out to be the man's son and Bim gets a reward for rescuing him. Harvey is unmasked as the chauffeur who kidnapped the boy and is arrested. Bim and Bill, dressed in suits show up at Mary's house. Bim stumbles through a proposal and they walk off.

== Cast ==
- Buck Jones as Bim
- Helen Ferguson as Mary Bruce
- Georgie Stone as Bill
- Duke R. Lee as Sheriff
- William Buckley as Harvey Cahill
- Eunice Murdock Moore as Mrs. Stone
- Bert Appling as Brakeman
- Edwin B. Tilton as Dr. Stone (credited as Edwin Booth Tilton)
- Slim Padgett as Outlaw
- Johnny Cookie as the Constable
