= Youth's Gamble =

1925 silent film

- Directed by: Albert S. Rogell
- Written by: John Grey; Henry Roberts Symonds
- Produced by: Harry Joe Brown; W. Ray Johnston
- Starring: Reed Howes; James Thompson; Margaret Morris
- Cinematography: Ross Fisher
- Production company: Harry J. Brown Productions
- Distributed by: Rayart Pictures
- Release date: July 7, 1925
- Running time: 50 minutes
- Country: United States
- Languages: Silent; English intertitles

Youth's Gamble is a 1925 American silent action film directed by Albert S. Rogell and starring Reed Howes, James Thompson and Margaret Morris.

== Cast ==
- Reed Howes as William Ignatius Newton
- James Thompson as Addison Simms
- Margaret Morris as Hazel Dawn
- Wilfred Lucas as Harry Blaine
- Gale Henry as Winifred Elaine Thomas
- William Buckley as Tombstone Reilly
- David Kirby as Obituary Blake

== Bibliography ==
- Rainey, Buck. Sweethearts of the Sage: Biographies and Filmographies of 258 actresses appearing in Western movies. McFarland & Company, 1992.
