= William Welsh (actor) =

American actor (1870-1946)

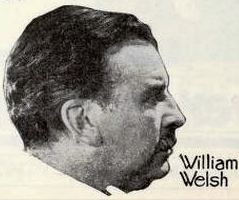
- Welsh from an ad for The Flirt (1922)
- Born: February 9, 1870; Philadelphia, Pennsylvania, U.S.
- Died: July 16, 1946 (aged 76); Los Angeles, California, U.S.
- Occupation: Actor
- Years active: 1912–1936

William Welsh (February 9, 1870 – July 16, 1946) was an American actor of stage and the silent era. He appeared in 153 films between 1912 and 1936. He was born in Philadelphia, Pennsylvania, and died in Los Angeles, California at age 76.

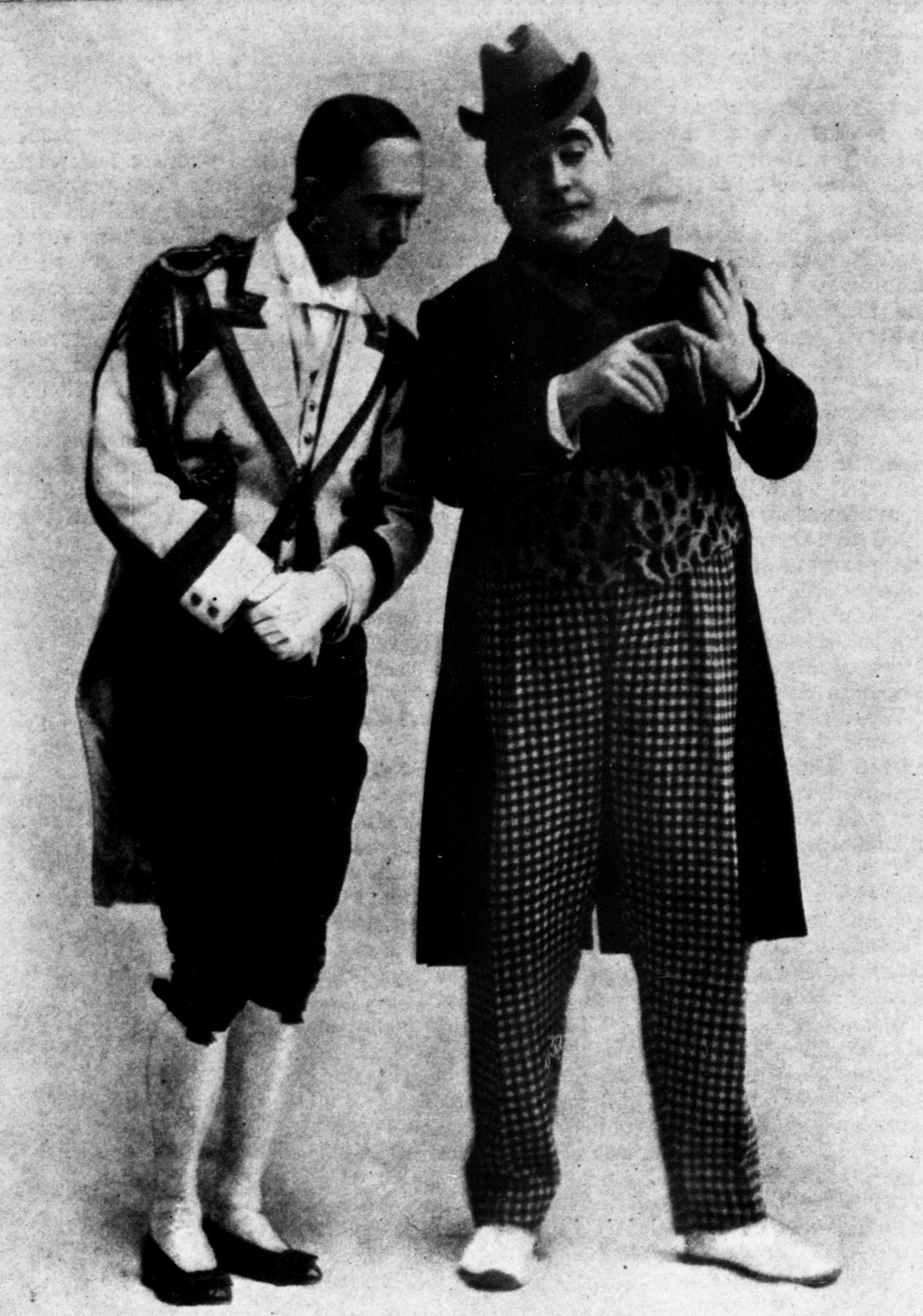
Cyril Biddulph (left) and William Welsh (right) from photo from play on page 24 of Harper’s Weekly, April 30, 1910 Vol 54 Iss 2784.

== Selected filmography ==
- Robespierre (1913) - Dumont
- Traffic in Souls (1913) - William Trubus
- Neptune's Daughter (1914) - King Neptune
- Courtmartialed (1915) - General Bleirot
- The White Terror (1915) - David Duncan
- Conscience (1915) - John Benson
- Thou Shalt Not Lie (1915, Short) - Fred Wales
- The Primrose Path (1915) - Cartwright
- The Lords of High Decision (1916) - Walsh
- Autumn (1916)
- Elusive Isabel (1916) - Chief Campbell
- The Narrow Path (1916) - Bessie's Father
- Two Seats at the Opera (1916, Short) - Dr. Jones
- The Foolish Virgin (1916) - Jim's father
- 20,000 Leagues Under the Sea (1916) - Charles Denver
- The Eternal Sin (1917) - Gubetta
- Parentage (1917) - John Brown
- Bull's Eye (1917, Serial) - John North
- The Heart of Humanity (1918) - Prussian Officer
- The Little Diplomat (1919) - Bradley West
- Trailed by Three (1920) - Aboto
- Cynthia of the Minute (1920) - Mr. Acklin
- Over the Hill to the Poorhouse (1920) - Pa Benton
- Dangerous Love (1920)
- A Man from Nowhere (1920) - George Ainslee
- Crossed Clues (1921, Short)
- The Man Tamer (1921) - Circus Manager
- Reputation (1921) - Max Gossman
- Luring Lips (1921) - James Tierney
- Short Skirts (1921) - Woodward Christie
- The Secret Four (1921)
- Orphans of the Storm (1921) - Role (uncredited)
- With Stanley in Africa (1922)
- The Scrapper (1922) - Dan McCarthy
- Top o' the Morning (1922) - Dermott O'Donnell
- The Lone Hand (1922) - Al Sheridan
- Ridin' Wild (1922) - John Henderson
- The Flirt (1922) - George Carroll
- Around the World in 18 Days (1923, Serial) - Matthew Harlow
- The Social Buccaneer (1923) - Raymond Norton
- The Town Scandal (1923) - Samuel Grimes
- Dead Game (1923) - Harlu
- Burning Words (1923) - John Malcolm
- Trifling with Honor (1923) - Warden
- The Shock (1923) - Mischa Hadley
- Shootin' for Love (1923) - Bill Randolph
- Shadows of the North (1923) - Jeffrey Neilson
- Beasts of Paradise (1923)
- The Ramblin' Kid (1923) - Lafe Dorsey
- The Red Warning (1923) - George Ainslee
- The Man from Wyoming (1924) - David Messiter
- The Law Forbids (1924) - Lawyer for the Plaintiff
- Excitement (1924) - Hiram Lyons
- The Iron Man (1924, Serial)
- The Price She Paid (1924) - General Lemuel Sidall
- The Western Wallop (1924) - Italian convict
- Flying Hoofs (1925) - Banker Conner
- The Fighting Ranger (1925, Serial) - John Marshall
- Don Dare Devil (1925) - José Remado
- The Red Rider (1925) - Ben Hanfer
- Fighting the Flames (1925) - Charlie Ryan
- The White Outlaw (1925) - Malcolm Gale
- Two-Fisted Jones (1925) - Henry Mortimer
- Western Pluck (1926) - 'Dynamite' Dyer
- The Demon (1926) - Percival Wade
- The Set-Up (1926) - Sheriff Hayes
- Frenzied Flames (1926) - Captain Meagan
- The Man from the West (1926) - Bill Hayes
- Obey The Law (1926) - The Father
- Wandering Girls (1927) - James Marston
- Paying the Price (1927) - Thomas Gordon
- Hills of Peril (1927) - Grimes
- The Western Rover (1927) - Alexander Seaton
- Chain Lightning (1927) - George Clearwater
- The Isle of Forgotten Women (1927) - Mr. Paine
- The Opening Night (1927) - Fisherman
- Daredevil's Reward (1928) - James Powell
- The Head of the Family (1928) - Daniel Sullivan
- Lightning Speed (1928) - Governor
- Companionate Marriage (1928) - Mr. Williams
- Come and Get It (1929) - Judge Elliott (Jane's father)
- The Mississippi Gambler (1929) - Captain Weathers
- Skinner Steps Out (1929) - Crosby
- The Love Trader (1930) - Benson
- Sundown Trail (1931) - Pa Stoddard
- Freighters of Destiny (1931) - Tim 'Dad' Mercer
- Beyond the Rockies (1932) - Rancher Allen
- Gambling Ship (1933) - Conductor (uncredited)
- Whom the Gods Destroy (1934) - Balkan Captain (uncredited)
- One More River (1934) - Juryman (uncredited)
- Ruggles of Red Gap (1935) - Eddie (uncredited)
- Queen of the Jungle (1935) - John Lawrence
- Diamond Jim (1935) - Conductor (uncredited)
- Wanderer of the Wasteland (1935) - Man #1
- Stormy (1935) - Old Miner (uncredited)
- Cavalry (1936) - Gen. John Harvey
