= The Yellow Pawn =

1916 film by George Melford

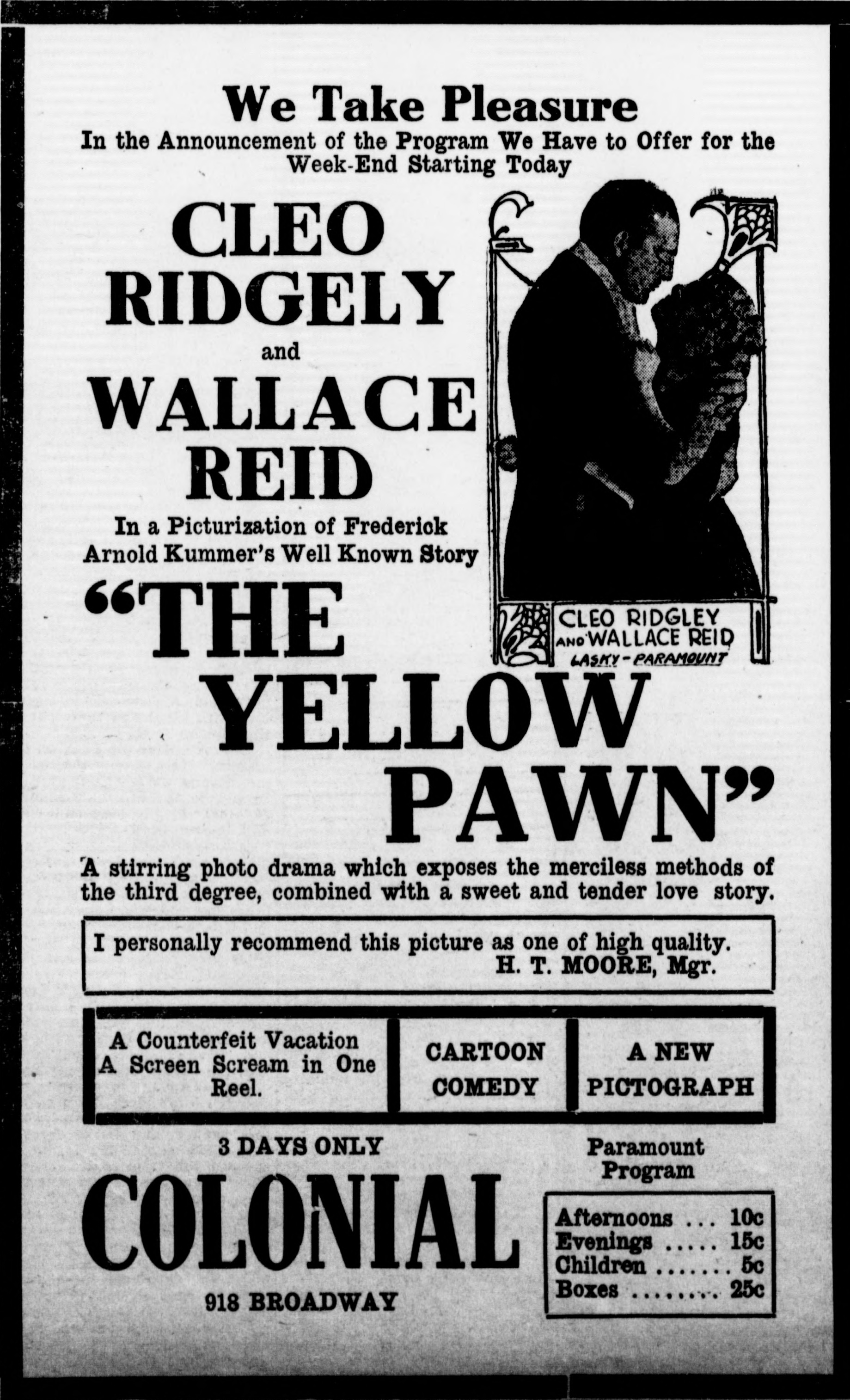
- Newspaper advertisement
- Directed by: George Melford
- Screenplay by: Frederic Arnold Kummer; Margaret Turnbull
- Produced by: Jesse L. Lasky
- Starring: Wallace Reid; Cleo Ridgely; William Conklin; Tom Forman; Irene Aldwyn; Clarence Geldart
- Cinematography: Percy Hilburn (French)
- Production company: Jesse L. Lasky Feature Play Company
- Distributed by: Paramount Pictures
- Release date: November 23, 1916
- Running time: 50 minutes
- Country: United States
- Language: English

The Yellow Pawn is a lost 1916 American drama silent film directed by George Melford and written by Frederic Arnold Kummer and Margaret Turnbull. The film stars Wallace Reid, Cleo Ridgely, William Conklin, Tom Forman, Irene Aldwyn and Clarence Geldart. The film was released on November 23, 1916, by Paramount Pictures.

== Cast ==
- Wallace Reid as James Weldon
- Cleo Ridgely as Kate Turner
- William Conklin as Allen Perry
- Tom Forman as Philip Grant
- Irene Aldwyn as Marian Turner
- Clarence Geldart as Mr. Turner
- George Webb as Tom Weldon
- George Kuwa as Sen Yat
