= The Town Scandal =

1923 film

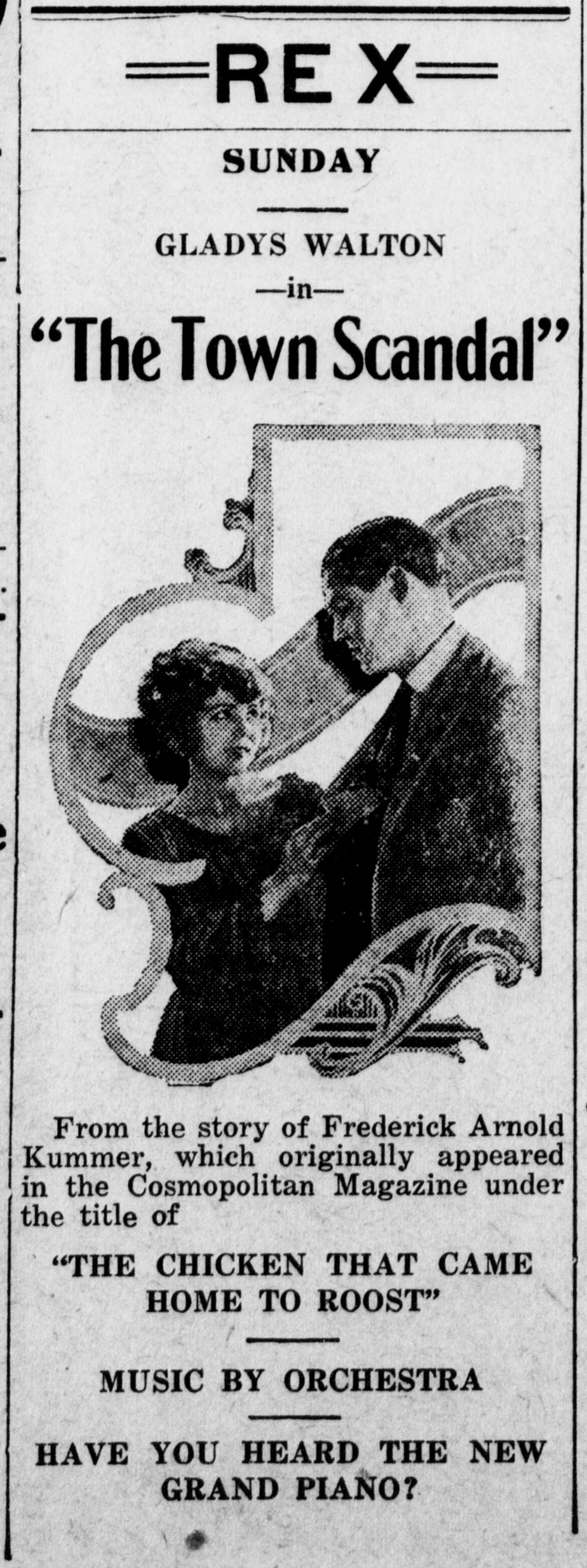
- Contemporary advertisement
- Directed by: King Baggot
- Screenplay by: Hugh Hoffman
- Based on: The Chicken That Came Home to Roost by Frederic Arnold Kummer
- Starring: Gladys Walton; Edward Hearn; Edward McWade; Charles Hill Mailes; William Welsh; Billy Franey
- Cinematography: Victor Milner
- Production company: Universal Pictures
- Distributed by: Universal Pictures
- Release date: April 16, 1923
- Running time: 50 minutes
- Country: United States
- Language: English

The Town Scandal is a 1923 American comedy film directed by King Baggot from a screenplay written by Hugh Hoffman. It was based on the novel The Chicken That Came Home to Roost by Frederic Arnold Kummer. The film stars Gladys Walton, Edward Hearn, Edward McWade, Charles Hill Mailes, William Welsh and Billy Franey. The film was released on April 16, 1923, by Universal Pictures.

== Cast ==
- Gladys Walton as Jean Crosby
- Edward Hearn as Toby Caswell
- Edward McWade as Avery Crawford
- Charles Hill Mailes as Bill Ramsey
- William Welsh as Samuel Grimes
- Billy Franey as Lysander Sprowl
- Anna Dodge as Mrs. Crawford
- Virginia True Boardman as Mrs. Sprowl
- Rosa Gore as Effie Strong
- Nadine Beresford as Mrs. Grimes
- Louise Reming Barnes as Mrs. Ramsey
- Margaret Morris as Trixie
