= The Western Wallop =

1924 film

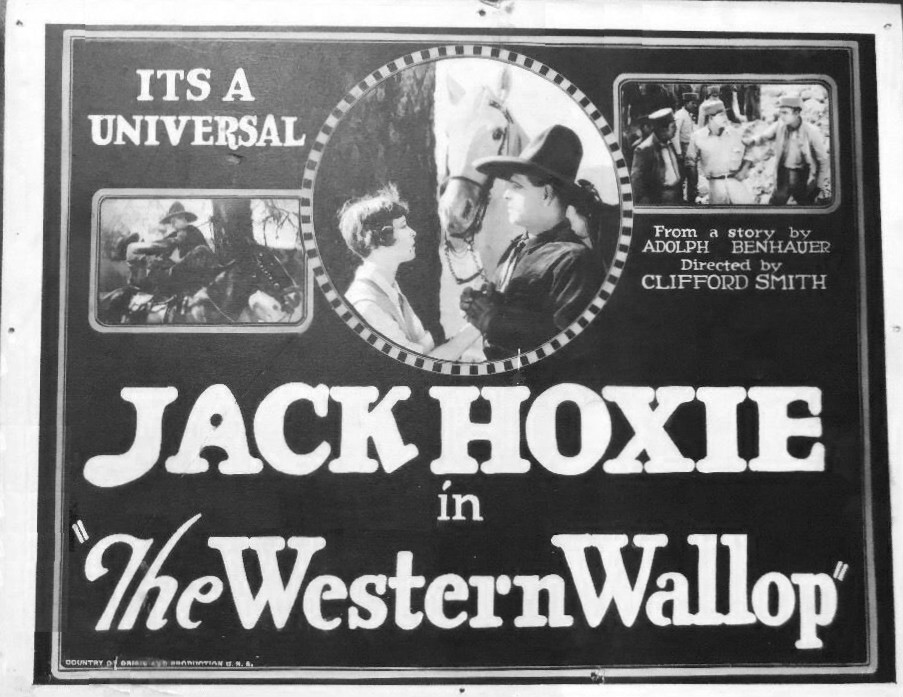
- lobby card
- Directed by: Clifford Smith
- Written by: Wyndham Gittens(scenario); Isadore Bernstein(adaptation)
- Based on: short story On Parole by Adolph Bannauer
- Produced by: Carl Laemmle
- Starring: Jack Hoxie
- Cinematography: Harry Neumann
- Distributed by: Universal Pictures
- Release date: October 10, 1924
- Running time: 5 reels
- Country: United States
- Languages: Silent; English intertitles

The Western Wallop is a lost 1924 American silent Western film directed by Clifford Smith and starring Jack Hoxie. It was produced and released by the Universal Pictures.

== Cast ==
- Jack Hoxie as Bart Tullison
- Margaret Landis as Anita Stilwell
- J. Gordon Russell as Jefferson Bradshaw
- Charles Brinley as Sheriff Malloy
- Duke R. Lee as Bandit
- Fred Burns as Marshal Malloy
- Jack Pratt as Convict Leader
- Herbert Fortier as Jim Stillwell
- Joseph W. Girard as Prison Warden
- William Welsh as Italian Convict
- Scout as Bart's horse
