= Enemies of Society =

1927 film by Ralph Ince

- Directed by: Ralph Ince
- Written by: J.G. Hawks; John Chapman Hilder; Dorothy Yost
- Cinematography: Allen G. Siegler
- Production company: Robertson-Cole Pictures Corporation
- Distributed by: Film Booking Offices of America
- Release date: February 27, 1927
- Country: United States
- Languages: Silent; English intertitles

Enemies of Society is a 1927 American silent film directed by Ralph Ince and starring Conway Tearle, Margaret Morris and Frankie Darro. It is also known by the alternative title of Moulders of Men.

== Cast ==
- Conway Tearle as Dr. William Matthews
- Margaret Morris as Anne Grey
- Frankie Darro as Sandy Barry
- Rex Lease as Jim Barry
- Eugene Pallette as Barney Mulholland
- Jola Mendez as Betty
- William Knight as Detective Mailey

== Preservation status ==
- The film is preserved in the Euro archives, Cineteca Italiana (Milan) and Filmmuseum EYE Institute, Amsterdam, Netherlands.

== Bibliography ==
- Quinlan, David. The Illustrated Guide to Film Directors. Batsford, 1983.
