= The Scarlet Streak =

1925 film

- Directed by: Henry MacRae
- Starring: Jack Dougherty; Lola Todd
- Distributed by: Universal Pictures
- Release date: December 20, 1925
- Running time: 10 episodes
- Country: United States
- Language: Silent with English intertitles

The Scarlet Streak is a 1925 American action film serial directed by Henry MacRae. This is now considered a lost film.

== Cast ==
- Jack Dougherty - Bob Evans (as Jack Daugherty)
- Lola Todd - Mary Crawford
- John Elliott - Professor Richard Crawford
- Albert J. Smith - Count 'K' (as Al Smith)
- Albert Prisco - Monk
- Virginia Ainsworth - Leontine, Monk's accomplice
- Monte Montague - Butler

== See also ==
- List of film serials
- List of film serials by studio
- List of lost films
