= The White Outlaw (1925 film) =

1925 film

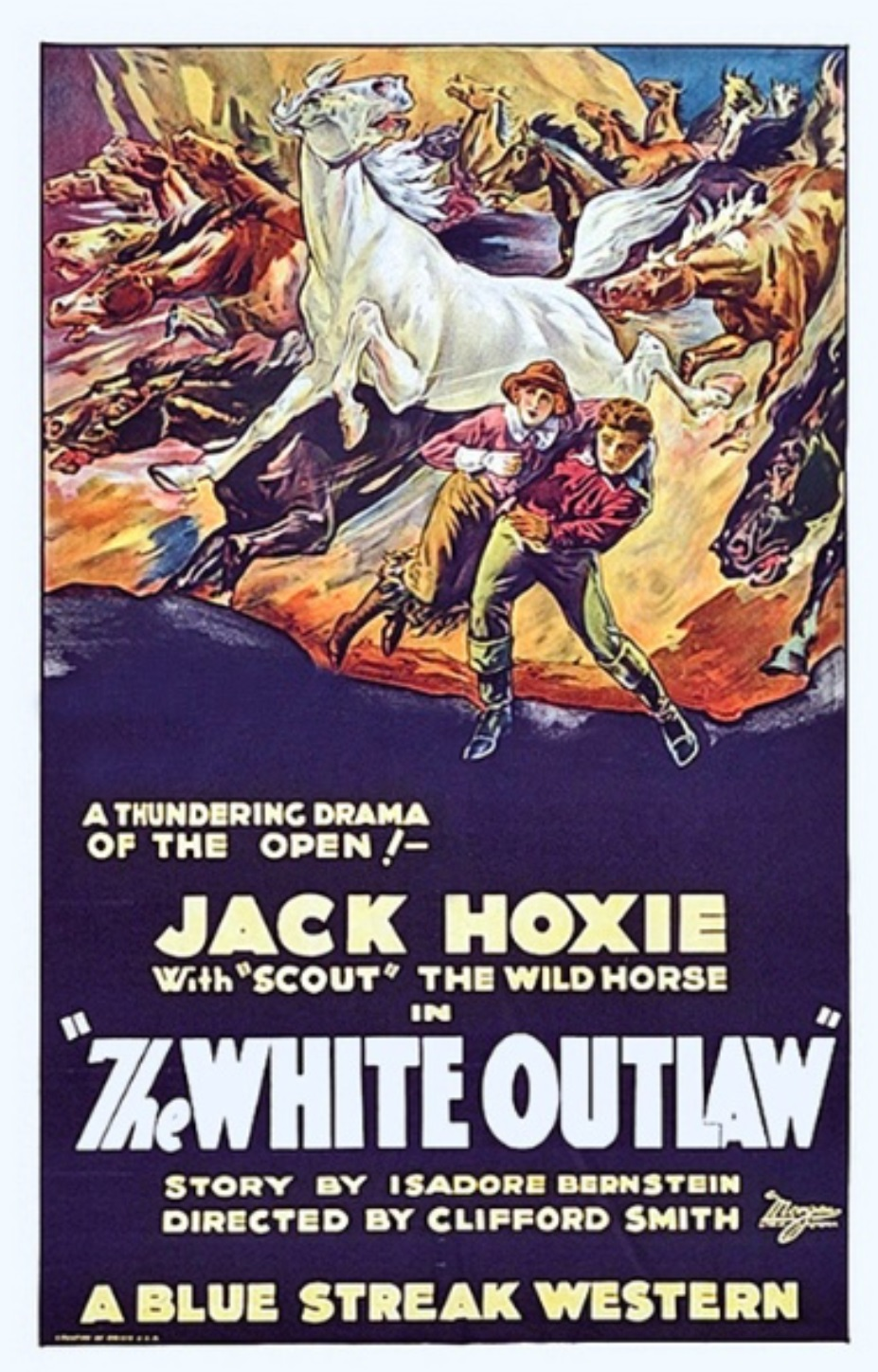
- Theatrical release poster
- Directed by: Clifford Smith
- Screenplay by: Isadore Bernstein
- Starring: Jack Hoxie; Marceline Day; William Welsh; Duke R. Lee; Floyd Shackelford; Charles Brinley
- Cinematography: William Nobles
- Production company: Universal Pictures
- Distributed by: Universal Pictures
- Release date: September 6, 1925
- Running time: 50 minutes
- Country: United States
- Language: Silent (English intertitles)

The White Outlaw is a 1925 American silent Western film directed by Clifford Smith and written by Isadore Bernstein. The film stars Jack Hoxie, Marceline Day, William Welsh, Duke R. Lee, Floyd Shackelford, and Charles Brinley. The film was released on September 6, 1925, by Universal Pictures.

== Plot ==
As described in a film magazine review, when a rancher loses his trick horse, he vows his determination to recover the animal. One of the ranch hands is responsible for the runaway of the horse. The foreman of the ranch accuses the rancher of stealing horses, but it is found that the wild horse had released all the other horses. Jack captures the wild horse and saves a stampede, rescuing his sweetheart Mary. His honor and courage are vindicated, and he wins the young woman.

== Cast ==
- Jack Hoxie as Jack Lupton
- Marceline Day as Mary Gale
- William Welsh as Malcolm Gale
- Duke R. Lee as James Hill
- Floyd Shackelford as George Washington Jr.
- Charles Brinley as Sheriff
- Scout the Horse as Scout
- Rex the Dog as Jack's Dog

== Preservation ==
While The White Outlaw is considered a lost film by the Library of Congress, a print of the film actually survives.

== See also ==
- List of films about horses
