= Terror Trail (1921 film) =

1921 film

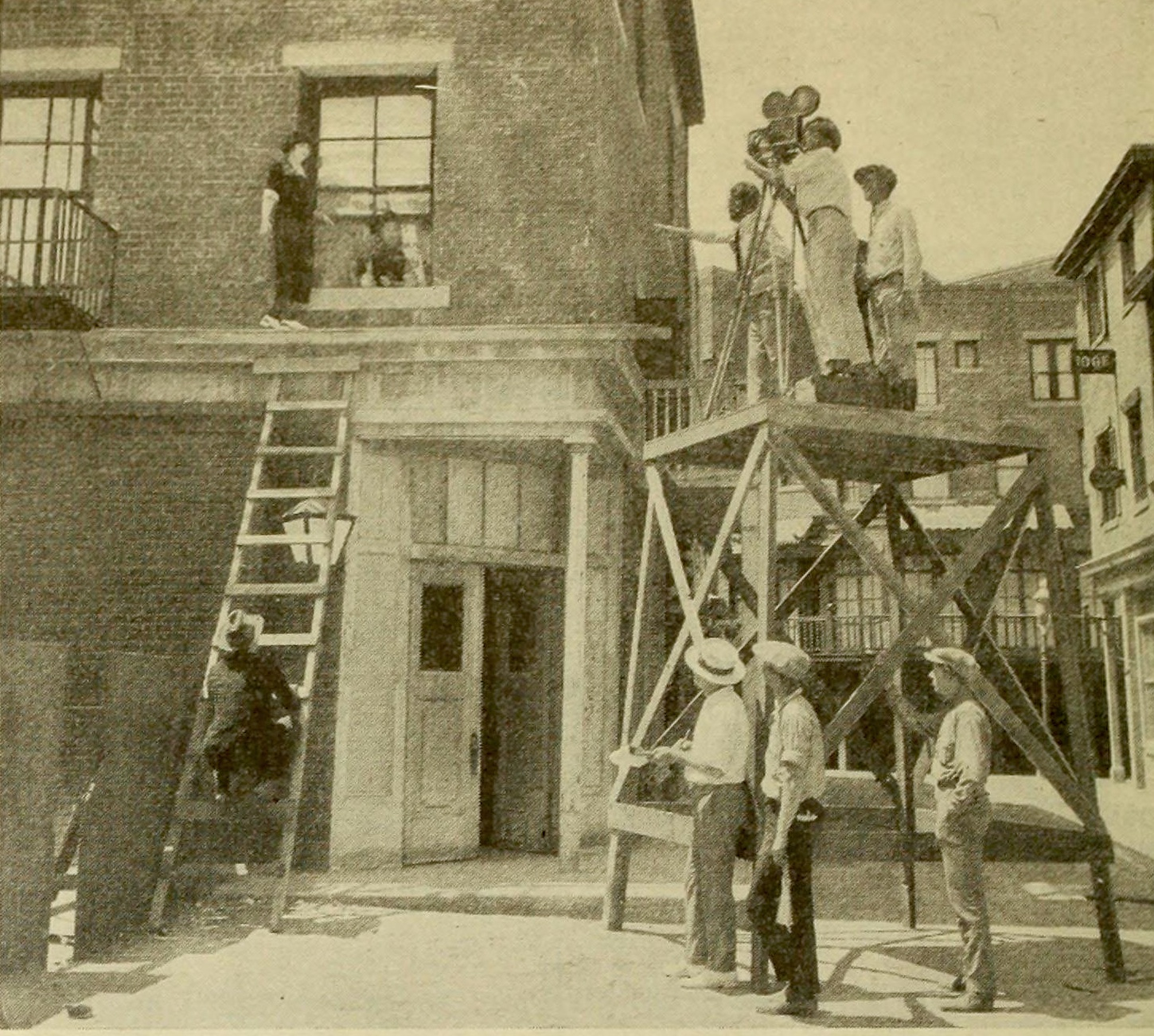
- Still from the production with Sedgwick on the window ledge
- Directed by: Edward A. Kull
- Written by: John Grey; Edward A. Kull; George H. Plympton
- Produced by: Stanley Bergerman; Carl Laemmle, Jr.
- Starring: Eileen Sedgwick; George Larkin
- Distributed by: Universal Film Manufacturing Co.
- Release date: July 21, 1921
- Running time: 18 episodes
- Country: United States
- Languages: Silent; English intertitles

Terror Trail is a 1921 American silent Western film serial directed by Edward A. Kull. It is considered to be a lost film.

Lobby card

Lobby card for episode 10-"Sands of Fate"

== Cast ==
- Eileen Sedgwick as Vera Vernon / Elaine Emerson
- George Larkin as Bruce Barnes
- Theodore Brown as Bertram Russell
- Albert J. Smith as Hunch Henderson
- Barney Furey as Holmes
- Pierre Couderc

== Chapter titles ==
1. The Mystery Girl
2. False Clues
3. The Mine of Menace
4. The Door of Doom
5. The Bridge of Disaster
6. The Ship of Surprise
7. The Palace of Fear
8. The Peril of the Palace
9. The Desert of Despair
10. Sands of Fate
11. The Menace of the Sea
12. The Isle of Eternity
13. The Forest of Fear
14. The Lure of the Jungle
15. The Jaws of Death
16. The Storm of Despair
17. The Arm of the Law
18. The Final Reckoning

== See also ==
- List of film serials
- List of film serials by studio
- List of lost films
