= The Blue Streak =

The Blue Streak may refer to:

- The school newspaper at The Charter School of Wilmington, a high school in Wilmington, Delaware, USA
- Kentucky Blue Streak, a 1935 American film directed by Bernard B. Ray
- The British Blue Streak missile project of the 1950s
- The Blue Streak (1926 film), directed by Noel M. Smith
