= No Defense =

No Defense may refer to:

- No Defense (1929 film), an American romantic drama film
- No Defense (1921 film), an American silent drama film
- Nolo contendere, a legal term sometimes known as no defense
