= Steelheart (disambiguation) =

Steelheart or Steel Heart may refer to:

- Steelheart, an American glam metal band
  - Steelheart (album), their 1990 debut album
- Steelheart (film), a 1912 American silent film
- Steelheart (novel), 2013, by Brandon Sanderson
- Steel Heart (horse), a racehorse
- Steelheart, a character in the American animated television series SilverHawks
