= When Danger Smiles =

1922 film

- Directed by: William Duncan
- Written by: Bradley J. Smollen; John B. Clymer
- Produced by: Albert E. Smith
- Starring: William Duncan; Edith Johnson; James Farley
- Cinematography: George Robinson
- Production company: Vitagraph Company of America
- Distributed by: Vitagraph Company of America
- Release date: October 3, 1922
- Running time: 50 minutes
- Country: United States
- Languages: Silent; English intertitles

When Danger Smiles is a 1922 American silent Western film directed by William Duncan and starring Duncan, Edith Johnson and James Farley.

== Cast ==
- William Duncan as Ray Chapman
- Edith Johnson as Frania Caravelle
- James Farley as Jacob Holmar
- Henry Hebert as Francisco Caravalle
- Charles Dudley as Jim Barker
- William McCall as Marshall

== Bibliography ==
- Langman, Larry. A Guide to Silent Westerns. Greenwood Publishing Group, 1992.
