= William Duncan (actor) =

American actor

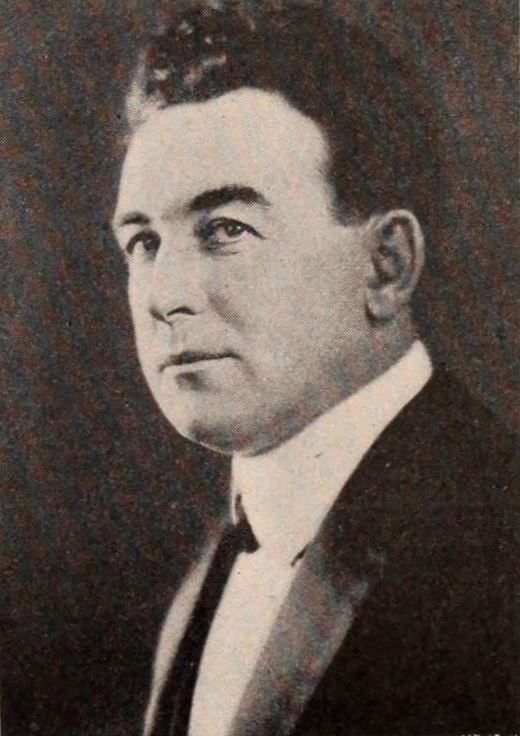
- Duncan in 1920
- Born: 16 December 1879; Dundee, Scotland
- Died: 7 February 1961 (aged 81); Hollywood, California, U.S.
- Resting place: Inglewood Park Cemetery
- Occupations: Actor; Film director
- Years active: 1911 - 1940
- Spouse(s): Edith Johnson (married 1921–1961)

William Duncan (16 December 1879 – 7 February 1961), born in Dundee, Scotland, was known as a major actor, producer, writer, and director of film serials and features in Hollywood. After immigrating to the United States as a child with his family, he became a leading star in the new film industry. Promoted as a Scottish star, he became one of the highest paid actors when under contract to Vitagraph.

Duncan worked with major studios of the day, including the Selig Polyscope Company and Vitagraph. As was typical of many early films, especially the silents, most of his films have not survived to the present day.

== Early life and education ==
Born in the Lochee area of Dundee in 1879, Duncan immigrated as a child to the United States with his family in 1890. They settled in Philadelphia. He attended public school, where he started to play American football. He enrolled at University of Pennsylvania, where he played football and participated in track, but left after two years of study.

== Career ==
Duncan worked as physical director at the McFadden Physical Culture Health Home, and wrote for a magazine about physical culture. He also operated a gymnasium in Philadelphia and was a professional wrestler.

Duncan debuted in vaudeville in 1906 as part of a strongman act. Next he acted in stock theater companies in Philadelphia;, Memphis, Tennessee; and Rochester, New York.

He began to act in silent films, and had roles in hundreds of serial episodes, many of them Westerns. His career spanned the change to "talkies", and he acted from 1911 to 1940. When William Duncan joined Vitagraph, his contract was worth $1,000,000 a year. He was better paid than Mary Pickford and Douglas Fairbanks. He appeared in films with Olympic swimmer Buster Crabbe (who played Flash Gordon in the 1930s). He was also a prolific writer and director of films.

Duncan followed the film industry to California and lived and worked there for most of his life. At his death, he was interred at Inglewood Park Cemetery, Inglewood, California, USA.

== Family ==
Duncan married twice. His second wife was silent film actress Edith Johnson, with whom he had often costarred. They had two sons and one daughter together. The couple were married until Duncan's death in 1961.

== Legacy and honors ==
Duncan is featured as a character in A-Z of Dundee (2019), a musical play written by John and Gerry Kielty. Produced by Dundee Rep, it features notable people associated with Dundee. In addition to playing at venues in that city, it was planned to tour other cities in Scotland.

== Selected filmography ==
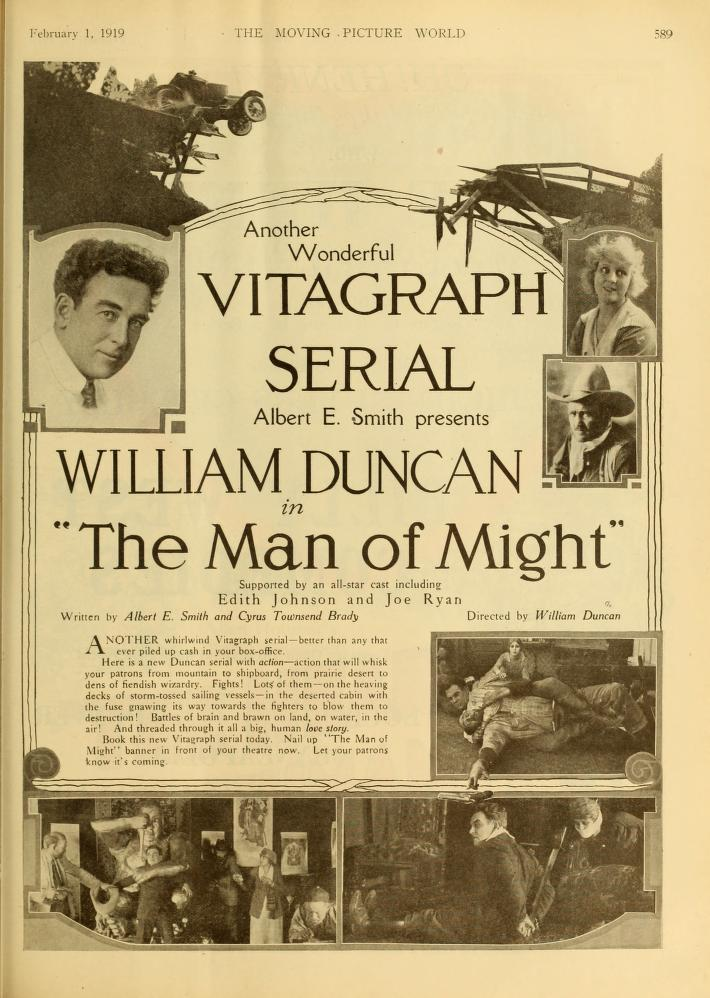
The Man of Might (1919)

- The Telltale Knife (1911)
- The Count of Monte Cristo (1912)
- The Fighting Trail (1917)
- Money Magic (1917)
- Aladdin from Broadway (1917)
- Smashing Barriers (1919)
- Hopalong Rides Again (1921)
- Steelheart (1921)
- Fighting Fate (1921)
- Where Men Are Men (1921)
- No Defense (1921)
- The Silent Vow (1922)
- The Fighting Guide (1922)
- When Danger Smiles (1922)
- The Steel Trail (1923)
- Playing It Wild (1923)
- The Fast Express (1924)
- Wolves of the North (1924)
- Hello, 'Frisco (1924)
- Three on the Trail (1936)
- Forlorn River (1937)
- The Frontiersmen (1938)
- Bar 20 Justice (1938)
- The Farmer's Daughter (1940)
