= Tote Du Crow =

Native American silent film actor

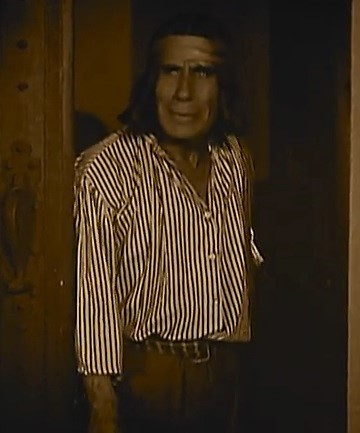
- Du Crow as Bernardo in The Mark of Zorro (1920)
- Born: Watsonville, California, U.S.
- Other name: George Skyrock
- Occupations: Film actor, circus performer, vaudevillian
- Years active: 1915–1926
- Spouse: Florence Ashbrooke

Tote Du Crow (also known as George Skyrock or Shyroch) was a film actor and circus performer who acted in many silent films during the early days of Hollywood.

== Biography ==
Tote was born in Watsonville, California, to parents of Castilian and French origins. According to some accounts, as children, Tote and his brother Daniel ran away from home to join the circus; other sources say their father apprenticed them out to a circus showman.

Tote Du Crow portrayed Bernardo in the silent Zorro films.

He played 36 minor roles from 1915 until his death. His last film is The Blue Streak from 1926. He was married to Florence Ashbrooke from 1889 until 1909, after separating in 1904.

== Selected filmography ==
- The Americano (1916) as Alberto de Castille
- The Fighting Trail (1917)
- Rimrock Jones (1918)
- Treasure of the Sea (1918)
- The Ghost Flower (1918)
- Hugon, The Mighty (1918)
- The Prospector's Vengeance (1920)
- Hair Trigger Stuff (1920)
- The Rattler's Hiss (1920)
- The Moon Riders (1920)
- The Mark of Zorro (1920) as Bernardo, Zorro's deaf / mute assistant
- The White Horseman (1921)
- The Man of the Forest (1921)
- The Vermilion Pencil (1922)
- The Pride of Palomar (1922)
- The Social Buccaneer (1923)
- Thundergate (1923)
- The Thief of Bagdad (1924)
- Little Robinson Crusoe (1924)
- The Saddle Hawk (1925)
- Women and Gold (1925)
- Don Q, Son of Zorro (1925) as Bernardo
- Spook Ranch (1925)
- The Prairie Pirate (1925)
- The Blue Streak (1926)
