= Across the Border (film) =

1922 film

- Directed by: Charles R. Seeling
- Written by: Charles R. Seeling
- Produced by: Charles R. Seeling
- Starring: Guinn 'Big Boy' Williams; Patricia Palmer; William McCall
- Production company: Charles R. Seeling Productions
- Distributed by: Aywon Film Corporation
- Release date: January 15, 1922
- Running time: 50 minutes
- Country: United States
- Languages: Silent; English intertitles

Across the Border is a lost 1922 American silent Western film directed by Charles R. Seeling and starring Guinn 'Big Boy' Williams, Patricia Palmer and William McCall.

== Cast ==
- Guinn 'Big Boy' Williams as Andy Fowler
- Patricia Palmer as Margie Landers
- William McCall as Phillip Landers
- Chet Ryan as Jim
- J. Gordon Russell as The Sheriff

== Preservation ==
With no holdings located in archives, Across the Border is considered a lost film.
