= The Silent Vow =

1922 film

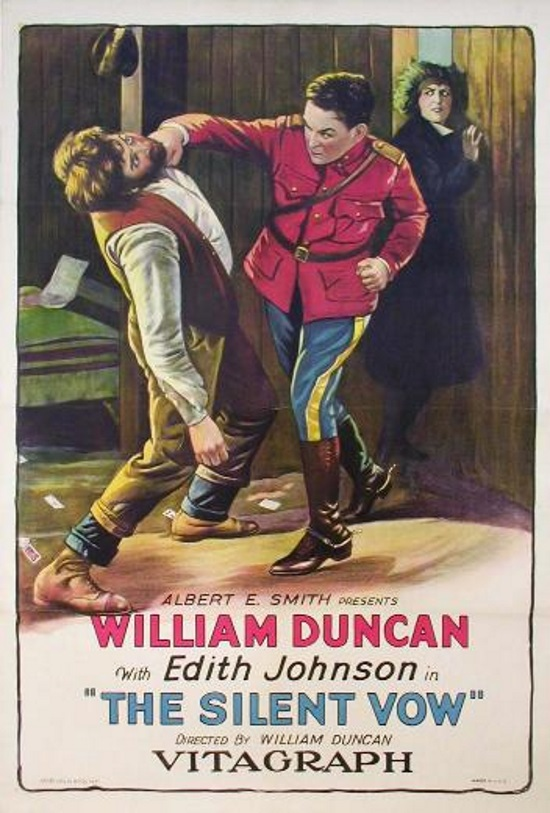
- Directed by: William Duncan
- Written by: Bradley J. Smollen
- Produced by: Albert E. Smith
- Starring: William Duncan; Edith Johnson; Dorothy Dwan
- Cinematography: George Robinson
- Production company: Vitagraph Company of America
- Distributed by: Vitagraph Company of America
- Release date: April 16, 1922
- Running time: 50 minutes
- Country: United States
- Languages: Silent; English intertitles

The Silent Vow is a 1922 American silent Western film directed by William Duncan and starring Duncan, Edith Johnson and Dorothy Dwan. It is a Northern, following the activities of an officer of the Mounties.

== Cast ==
- William Duncan as Richard Richard 'Dick' Stratton
- Edith Johnson as Anne
- Dorothy Dwan as Ethel
- Maude Emory as Elizabeth Stratton
- J. Morris Foster as Doug Gorson
- Henry Hebert as Jim Gorson
- Fred Burley as Bill Gorson
- Jack Curtis as 'Sledge' Morton
- Charles Dudley as The Professor

== Bibliography ==
- Rainey, Buck. Sweethearts of the Sage: Biographies and Filmographies of 258 actresses appearing in Western movies. McFarland & Company, 1992.
