= Smashing Barriers =

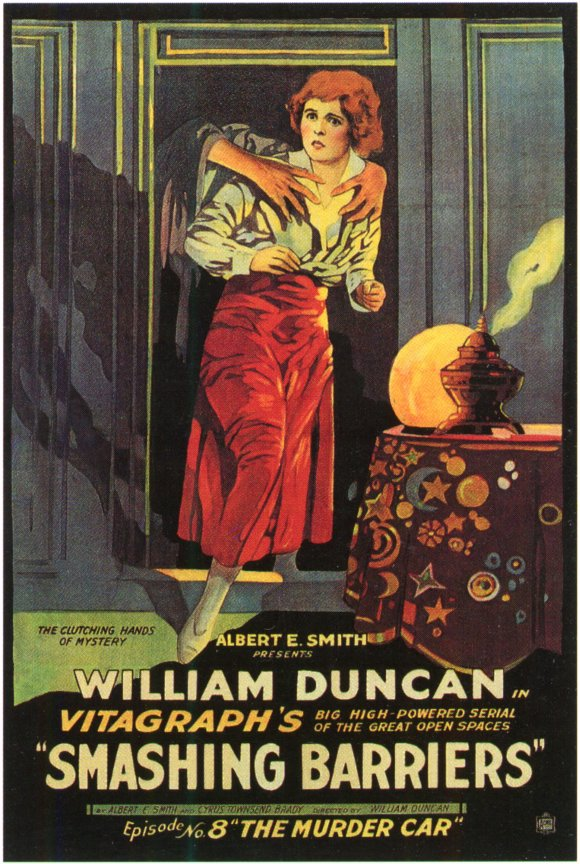
- Film Poster; chapter #8
- Directed by: William Duncan
- Written by: C. Graham Baker; R. Cecil Smith
- Based on: screen story by Albert E. Smith and Cyrus Townsend Brady
- Produced by: Vitagraph Company of America
- Starring: William Duncan; Edith Johnson
- Distributed by: Vitagraph Company of America
- Release date: September 1, 1919 (USA)
- Running time: 15 chapters
- Country: United States
- Language: Silent (English intertitles)

Smashing Barriers is a lost 1919 15-part 1919 American film serial directed by and starring William Duncan. It was produced and distributed by the Vitagraph Company of America.

This serial was condensed down to a 6-reel feature and rereleased by Vitagraph in 1923 under the same title.

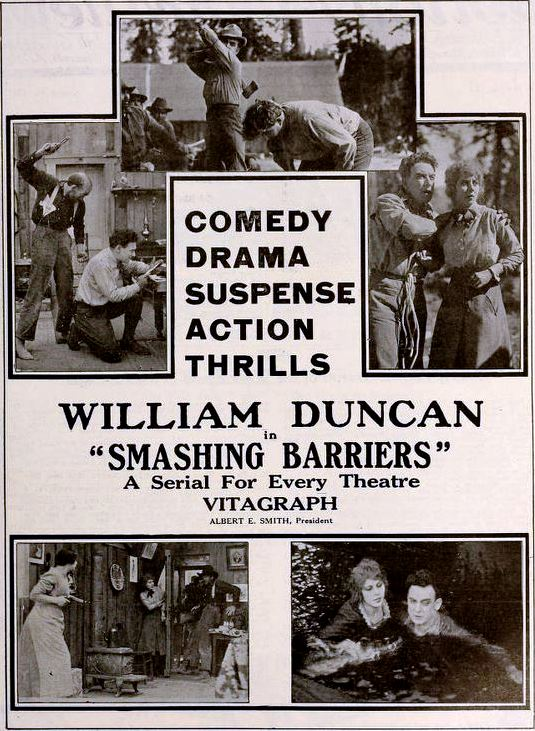
Advertisement

== Cast ==
- William Duncan as Dan Stevens
- Edith Johnson as Helen Cole
- Walter Rodgers as Slicker Williams
- George Stanley as John Stevens
- Fred Darnton as Benjamin Cole
- Slim Cole as Long Tom Brown
- William McCall as Henry Marlin
- Joe Ryan as Wirenail Hedges
- Vincente Howard
- Dorothea Wolbert

== Chapters ==
1. The Test of Courage
2. The Plunge of Death
3. The Tree Hut of Torture
4. The Deed of a Devil
5. The Living Grave
6. Downward to Doom
7. The Fatal Plight
8. The Murder Car
9. The Dynamite Tree
10. Overpowered
11. The Den of Deviltry
12. Explosive Bullets
13. The Deadfall
14. Trapped Like Rats
15. The Human Chain (alternate title: "The Final Barrier")

== Preservation status ==
- The complete original chapter serial is lost. An incomplete abridgement of the 1923 feature version survives with a private collector.
