= Guilty (1916 film) =

1916 film

- Directed by: Henry MacRae
- Written by: Bennett Cohen; William Parker
- Produced by: Universal's "IMP Production" unit
- Starring: Harry Carey
- Distributed by: Universal Pictures
- Release date: November 17, 1916
- Running time: 2 reels
- Country: United States
- Language: Silent with English intertitles

Guilty is a 1916 American silent drama film featuring Harry Carey and Edith Johnson.

== Cast ==
- Harry Carey as Ramon Valentine
- Edith Johnson as Grace
- Lee Shumway as Captain (as Leon C. Shumway)
- Peggy Coudray as Nedra Pagliano
- Lee Hill as Benton
- Mark Fenton as Grace's Uncle
- Edwin Wallock as Copeland (as E.N. Wallack)
- Hector Sarno as Joe Pagliano (as Hector V. Sarno)
