= The Pride of Palomar =

1922 film by Frank Borzage

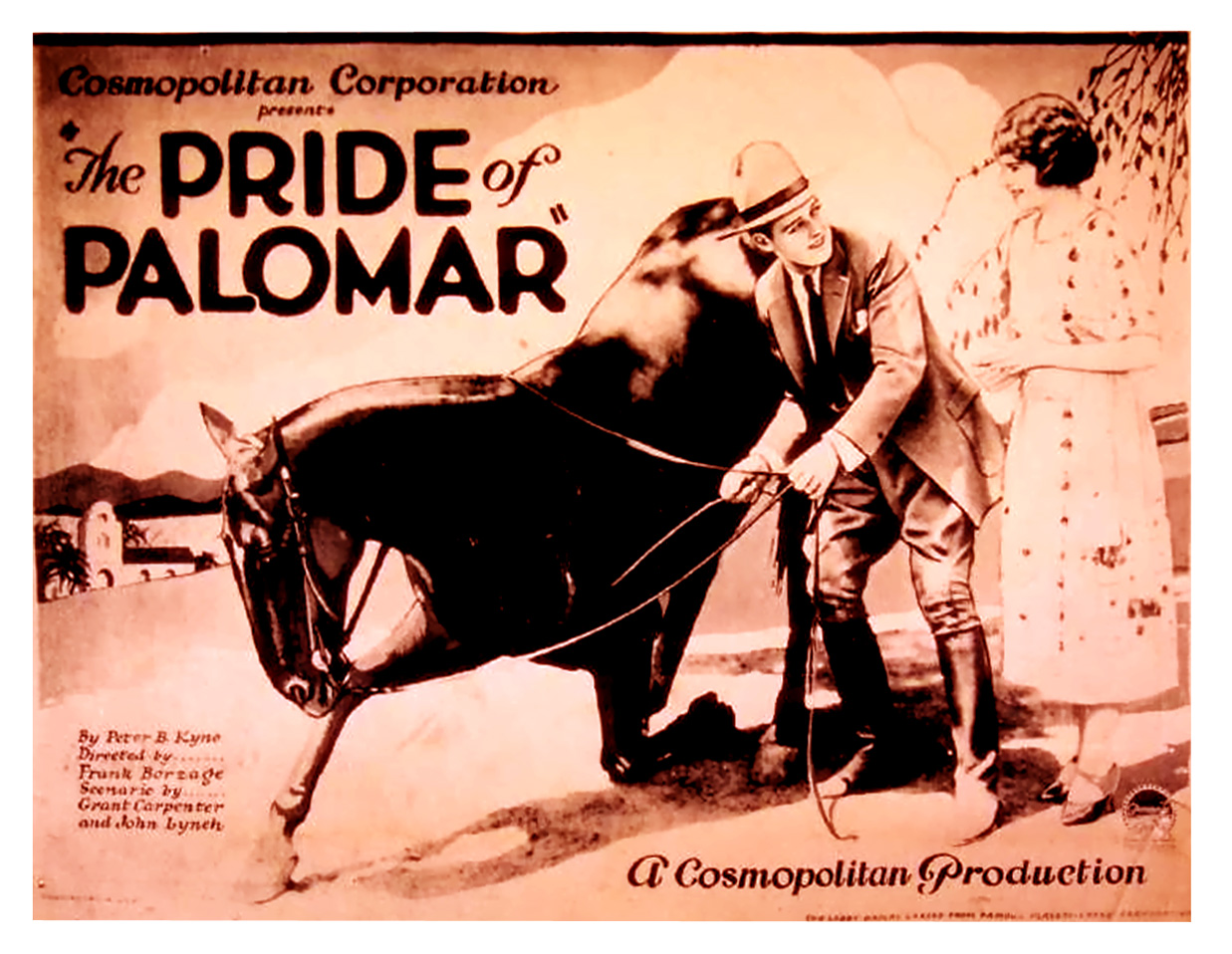
- Lobby card
- Directed by: Frank Borzage
- Screenplay by: Grant Carpenter; Peter B. Kyne; John Lynch
- Starring: Forrest Stanley; Marjorie Daw; Tote Du Crow; James O. Barrows; Joseph J. Dowling; Alfred Allen
- Cinematography: Chester A. Lyons
- Production company: Cosmopolitan Productions
- Distributed by: Paramount Pictures
- Release date: November 26, 1922
- Running time: 80 minutes
- Country: United States
- Language: Silent (English intertitles)

The Pride of Palomar (full film)

The Pride of Palomar is a 1922 American silent drama film directed by Frank Borzage and written by Grant Carpenter, Peter B. Kyne, and John Lynch. The film stars Forrest Stanley, Marjorie Daw, Tote Du Crow, James O. Barrows, Joseph J. Dowling, and Alfred Allen. The film was released on November 26, 1922, by Paramount Pictures.

A print of this film is preserved in the Library of Congress collection.

Set at the "Rancho El Palomar", it was filmed largely at Rancho Guajome and Mission San Luis Rey in Vista and Oceanside, California, respectively. As such, it gives some valuable glimpses of these two historical sites as they were about a century ago (though the back of the ranch building was stuccoed for the movie, which one can still see at Guajome). It also shows a few scenes featuring Pullman porters and dining cars of the 1920s. The movie was unusual in showing some kind of themed background to the intertitles.

== Cast ==
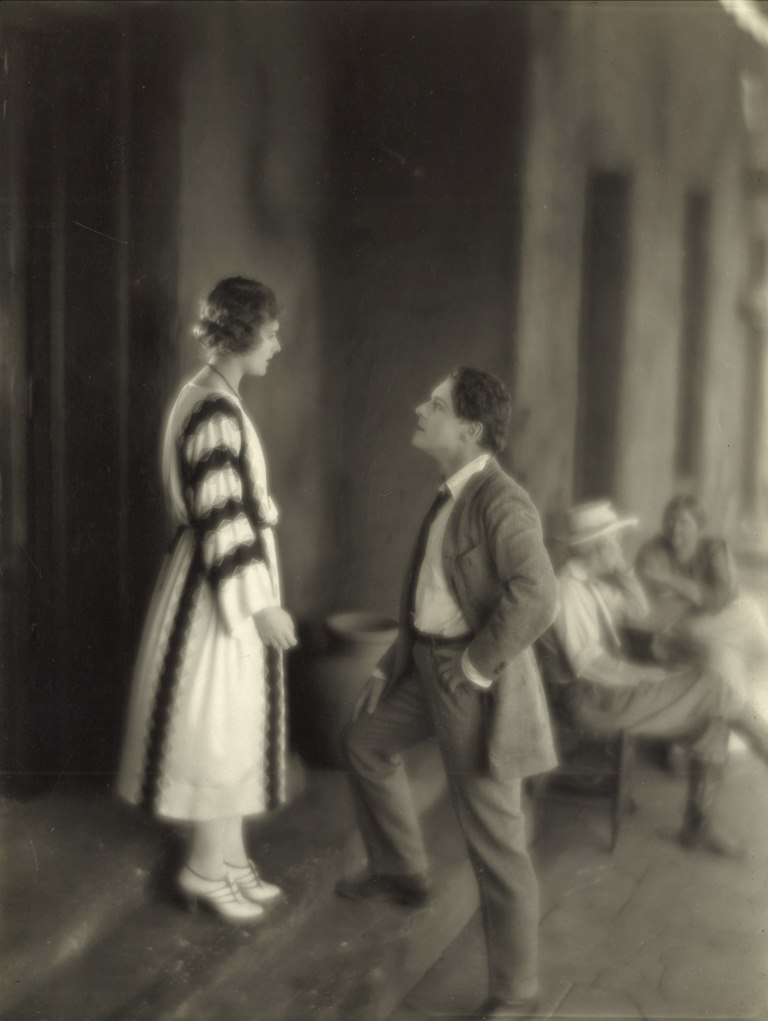
A still of Marjorie Daw and Forrest Stanley

- Forrest Stanley as Don Mike Farrell
- Marjorie Daw as Kay Parker
- Tote Du Crow as Pablo
- James O. Barrows as Father Dominic
- Joseph J. Dowling as Don Miguel
- Alfred Allen as John Parker
- George Nichols as Conway
- Warner Oland as Okada
- Mrs. Jessie Hebbard as Mrs. Parker
- Percy Williams as Butler
- Anna Dodge as Caroline
- Ed Brady as Lossolet
- Carmen Arselle as Anita Supvelda
- Eagle Eye as Nogi
- Most Mattoe as Alexandria
