= Charles Dudley (actor) =

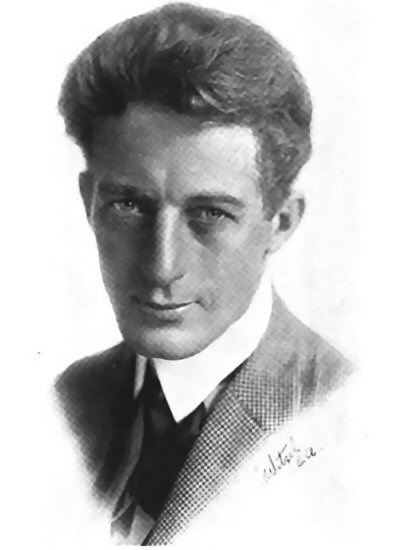
- Who's Who in the Film World, 1914
- Born: Charles Dudley Heaslip; October 1, 1883; Fort Grant, Territory of Arizona, US
- Died: March 9, 1952 (aged 68); Woodland Hills, California, US
- Occupation(s): Actor; studio make-up artist
- Spouse: Frances Dudley

Charles Dudley (October 1, 1883 - March 9, 1952) was an American stage and silent film actor who later had a successful career as a film studio make-up artist.

== Early life ==
Charles Dudley Heaslip was born on October 1, 1883, at Fort Grant, Arizona, the son of Irving Heaslip, a career soldier. His father was from St. Ann's, Ontario, Canada, and served over twenty-five years in the U.S. Army, seeing action at the Battle of Little Big Horn and later in the Philippine War of Independence. Nothing here is known of Dudley's mother other than she may have died young.

== Career ==
Before Dudley broke into film at around the age of thirty, he spent some twelve years performing on stage in comic and grand operas. His initial film work was under Milton H. Faroney, with Universal and later with such studios as Monopol, Keystone, Balboa and Vitagraph. During this period Dudley worked primarily in comedies as a character actor and later with Vitagraph in a number of movie serials. During his tenure with Balboa, Dudley played principal comedic roles under the direction of Bertram Bracken. Dudley was remembered for his portrayal of the blind father in the 1913 feature film Will o' the Wisp and for the serials Neal of the Navy, Who Pays, Hidden Danger, Fighting Fate and Purple Riders.

Sometime around 1925 Charles Dudley gave up acting to work as a studio make-up artist and went on to have a career that would span some twenty-five years or more, Dudley would rise to become head make-up artist at Twentieth Century-Fox where he worked with Shirley Temple for the greater part of her career. He went on to fill out his career with Warner Brothers until his retirement in 1950.

== Death ==
Charles Dudley Heaslip died on March 9, 1952, after an extended illness at the Motion Picture Country Home in Woodland Hills, California. He was survived by his wife Frances and daughter Lucille.

== Partial filmography ==
- Neal of the Navy (1915)
- Pay Dirt (1916)
- The Grip of Evil (1916)
- The Sultana (1916)
- Sold at Auction (1917)
- The Devil's Bait (1917)
- The Butcher Boy (1917)
- The Secret of Black Mountain (1917)
- The Bell Boy (1918)
- Moonshine (1918)
- Where Men Are Men (1921)
- Steelheart (1921)
- No Defense (1921)
- The Silent Vow (1922)
- When Danger Smiles (1922)
- The Purple Riders (1922)
- A Girl's Desire (1922)
- The Fighting Guide (1922)
- Wide Open Spaces (1924)
