= The Blue Fox (1921 film) =

1921 film

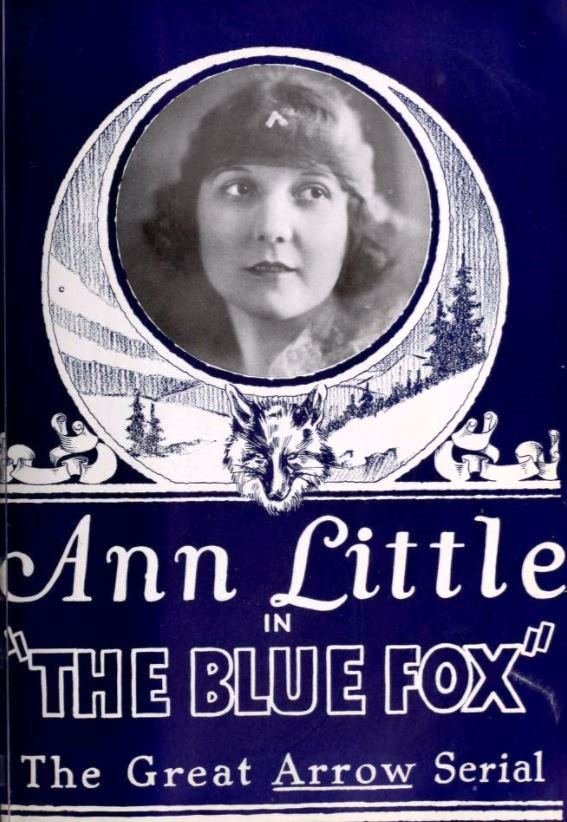
- Advertisement in Exhibitors Herald
- Directed by: Duke Worne
- Written by: Hope Loring
- Starring: Ann Little; J. Morris Foster
- Distributed by: Arrow Film Corporation
- Release date: May 9, 1921
- Running time: 15 episodes
- Country: United States
- Language: Silent (English intertitles)

The Blue Fox is a 1921 American silent adventure film serial directed by Duke Worne. An incomplete print of the film exists at the UCLA Film & Television Archive.

== Cast ==
- Ann Little as Ann Calvin
- J. Morris Foster as John Densmore
- Joseph W. Girard as Hawk Baxter
- Charles Mason as Robert Winslow
- William LaRock as Tarka
- Lon Seefield
- Fred L. Wilson
- Hope Loring

== Chapter titles ==
1. Message of Hate
2. Menace from the Sky
3. Mysterious Prisoner
4. A Perilous Ride
5. A Woman's Wit
6. A Night of Terror
7. Washed Ashore
8. A Perilous Leap
9. Lost Identity
10. In Close Pursuit
11. The Wilds of Alaska
12. The Camp of the Charkas
13. The Secret Skull
14. The Desert Island
15. Home and Happiness

== See also ==
- List of film serials
- List of film serials by studio

== See also ==
- List of partially lost films
