= The Fighting Guide =

1922 film

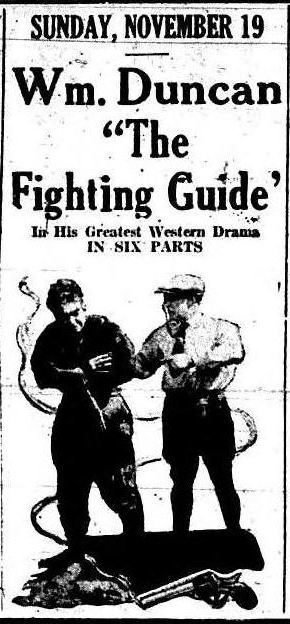
- Directed by: William Duncan
- Written by: Bradley J. Smollen
- Produced by: Albert E. Smith
- Starring: William Duncan; Edith Johnson; Harry Lonsdale
- Cinematography: George Robinson
- Production company: Vitagraph Company of America
- Distributed by: Vitagraph Company of America
- Release date: October 15, 1922
- Running time: 50 minutes
- Country: United States
- Languages: Silent; English intertitles

The Fighting Guide is a 1922 American silent Western film directed by William Duncan and starring Duncan, Edith Johnson and Harry Lonsdale.

== Cast ==
- William Duncan as Ned Lightning
- Edith Johnson as Ethel MacDonald
- Harry Lonsdale as Lord Chumleigh Winston
- William McCall as Tubbs
- Sidney D'Albrook as Grant Knowles
- Charles Dudley as John MacDonald
- Fred DeSilva as Indian Bill
- Dorothy Vernon as Mrs Carmody

== Censorship ==
Before The Fighting Guide could be exhibited in Kansas, the Kansas Board of Review required the removal of an intertitle saying "Tubbs, I've killed twenty-one men with this pistol, etc."

== Preservation ==
With no holdings located in archives, The Fighting Guide is considered a lost film.

== Bibliography ==
- Robert B. Connelly. The Silents: Silent Feature Films, 1910-36, Volume 40, Issue 2. December Press, 1998.
