= Edith Johnson (actress) =

American actress (1894–1961)

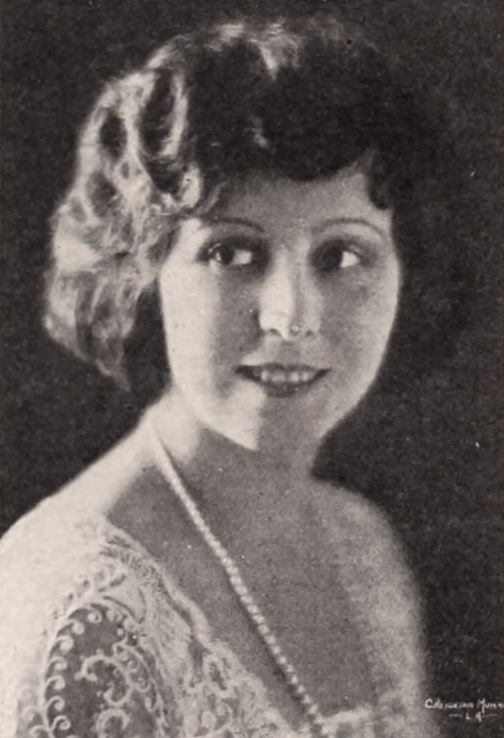
- Johnson in 1922
- Born: August 10, 1894; Rochester, New York City, U.S.
- Died: September 6, 1969 (aged 75); Los Angeles, California, U.S.
- Occupation: Actress
- Years active: 1913–1924
- Spouse: William Duncan (m. 1921; died 1961)

Edith Johnson (August 10, 1894 – September 6, 1969) was an American actress of the silent era. She appeared in more than 60 films between 1913 and 1924, mostly serials, action films and Westerns.

== Biography ==
Johnson was born in Rochester, New York and died in Los Angeles, California. The Eastman Kodak company had its headquarters in Rochester and Edith's first blush with fame came as the "Kodak Girl". She even became known as "the most photographed girl in the world".

Educated at Vassar College, she joined Selig Polyscope Company in 1914, though only after her marriage to actor William Duncan in 1921 did she begin to receive attention as an actress. With Duncan she had two sons and one daughter. They remained married until Duncan's death in 1961. Johnson died in Los Angeles after a fall.

== Career ==
Johnson appeared in her first film The Circular Staircase in 1915. After working on a serial with Duncan in 1918, the pair continued to co-star in films together. The pair became known as "the king and queen of the serial".

== Selected filmography ==
- Sweet Alyssum (1915)
- Behind the Lines (1916)
- The Conspiracy (1916)
- Guilty (1916)
- The Scarlet Crystal (1917)
- The Scarlet Car (1917)
- The Shuttle (1918)
- The Fighting Grin (1918)
- A Fight for Love (1919)
- Smashing Barriers (1919)
- Steelheart (1921)
- No Defense (1921)
- Where Men Are Men (1921)
- The Silent Vow (1922)
- The Fighting Guide (1922)
- When Danger Smiles (1922)
- Playing It Wild (1923)
- Smashing Barriers (1923)
- The Steel Trail (1923)
- The Fast Express (1924)
- Wolves of the North (1924)
- Hello, 'Frisco (1924)
