= Where Men Are Men =

1921 film

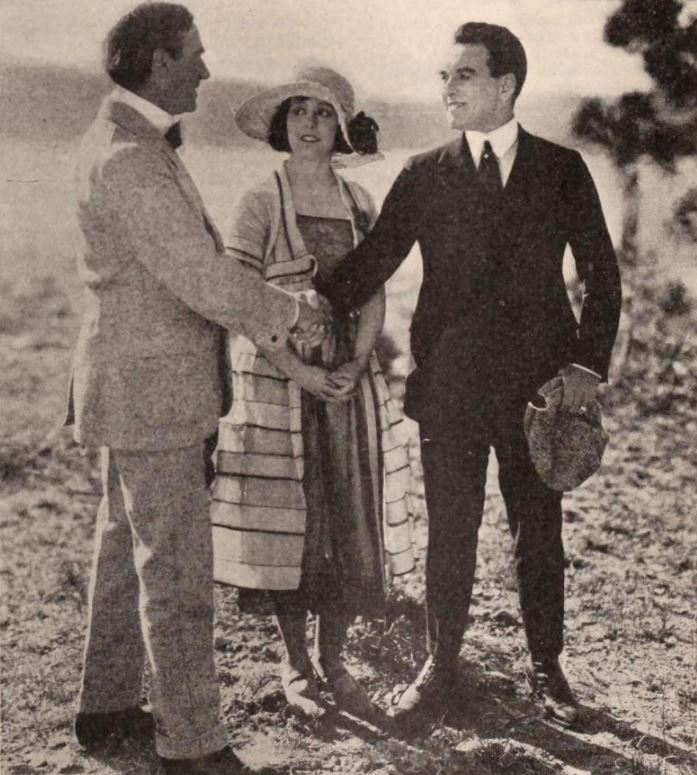
- Directed by: William Duncan
- Written by: Ralph Cummins (story); Thomas Dixon Jr.
- Starring: William Duncan; Edith Johnson; George Stanley
- Cinematography: George Robinson
- Production company: Vitagraph Company of America
- Distributed by: Vitagraph Company of America
- Release date: September 1, 1921
- Running time: 50 minutes
- Country: United States
- Languages: Silent; English intertitles

Where Men Are Men is a 1921 American silent Western film directed by William Duncan and starring Duncan, Edith Johnson and George Stanley.

== Cast ==
- William Duncan as Vic Foster
- Edith Johnson as Eileen aka 'Princess'
- George Stanley as Frank Valone
- Tom Wilson as 'Dutch' Monahan
- Gertrude Wilson as Laura Valone
- Harry Lonsdale as R.C. Cavendish
- George Kunkel as Sheriff Grimes
- William McCall as Mike Regan
- Charles Dudley as Monty Green

== Production ==
Where Men are Men's exteriors were filmed at Big Bear Lake and near Saugus. The film's working title was "The Princess of the Desert Dream" or just "The Desert Dream."

== Bibliography ==
- Rainey, Buck. Sweethearts of the Sage: Biographies and Filmographies of 258 actresses appearing in Western movies. McFarland & Company, 1992.
