= Moonshine (film) =

1918 film

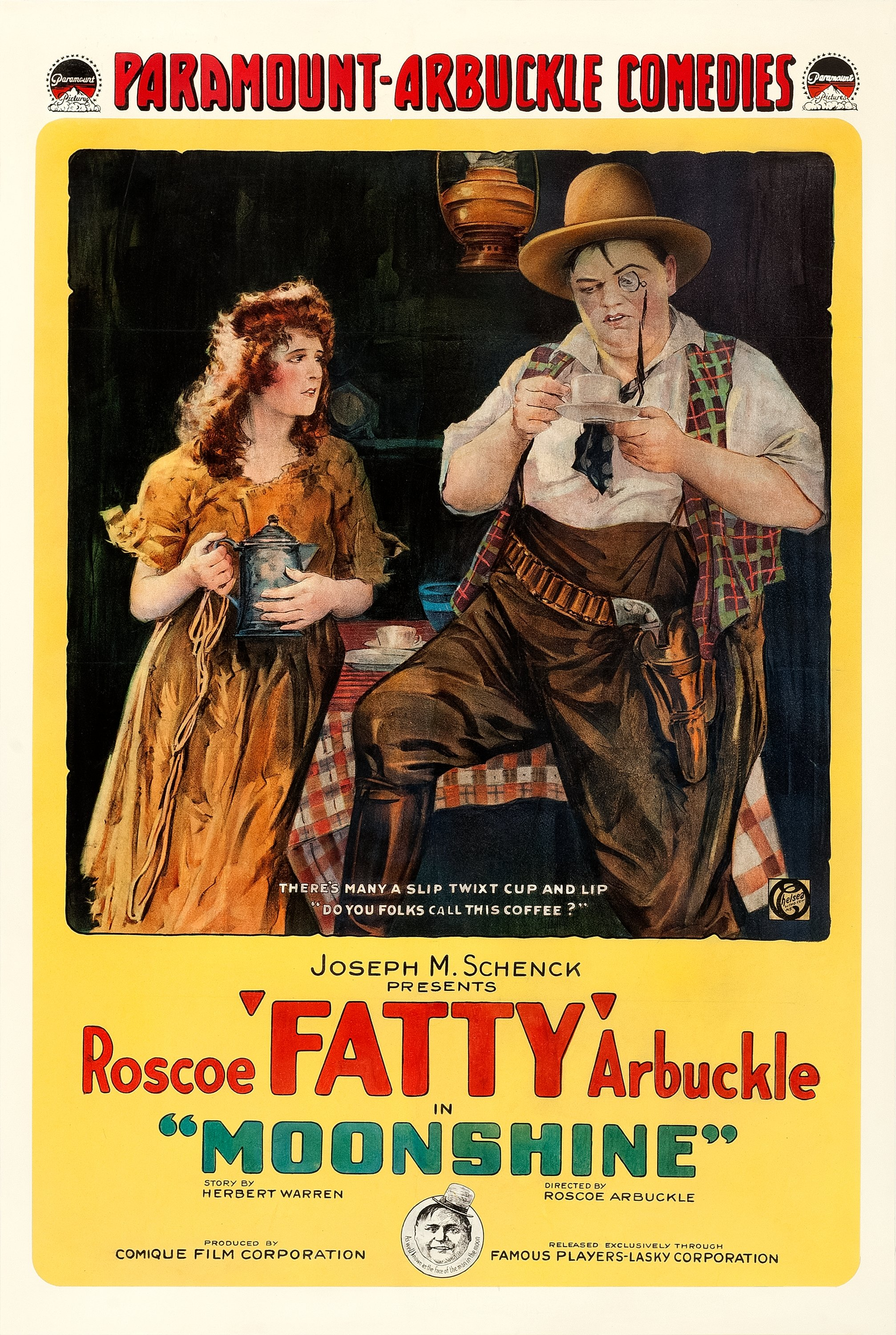
- Film poster
- Directed by: Roscoe Arbuckle
- Written by: Roscoe Arbuckle
- Starring: Roscoe Arbuckle; Buster Keaton
- Cinematography: George Peters
- Edited by: Herbert Warren; Buster Keaton
- Production company: Comique Film Company
- Distributed by: Paramount Pictures
- Release date: May 13, 1918
- Running time: 23 minutes
- Country: United States
- Language: Silent (English intertitles)

Moonshine is a 1918 American two-reel silent comedy film directed by and starring Roscoe "Fatty" Arbuckle and featuring Buster Keaton. The movie is available on YouTube.

== Plot ==
Moonshine (1918)

The setting is the Virginia Hills. Two revenue agents are tasked with hunting down bootleggers and bringing them to justice. The duo, aided by dozens of volunteers (all of whom somehow manage to fit inside Buster's small car), set off to track down the bootleggers. Fatty and Buster get separated from the group and take a tumble down a hill, which leaves their pants dirty. After Fatty washes Buster in a river and leaves him to dry hanging upside down in a tree, he meets Alice, the daughter of Jud Grew, the head bootlegger; they rapidly develop a romance.

After fighting another bootlegger who is madly in love with Alice, Fatty reunites with Buster and the two stumble across the bootlegger's storage space, where they find a stash of illegal moonshine. Fatty is ambushed and taken away by the bootlegger, but Buster gets away and dispatches the love rival bootlegger by pushing him off a cliff.

Fatty is taken back to the bootlegger's hideout, where, taking inspiration from The Count of Monte Cristo by Alexandre Dumas, he escapes by pretending to be dead so that the bootleggers will throw him into the river. He floats downstream before swimming to shore, where he reunites with Buster. The two make a plan to rescue Alice and to take down the bootlegger but realize that their band of volunteers is nowhere to be found. The love rival bootlegger sneaks up on them, knocks out Buster, and with help from his fellow bootleggers takes Fatty to a cabin and lights the fuse to a bomb inside. The cabin explodes, but then reassembles itself (i.e., the same film is run backwards), and he emerges totally unharmed. Fatty takes out the love rival bootlegger by using a gun that he has modified so that it can shoot around corners, and Buster dispatches the remaining bootleggers, except for the leader.

The leader proclaims that Fatty has proven himself worthy and gives him his blessing to marry Alice, but Fatty immediately refuses, revealing that he already has a wife. Buster agrees to marry Alice instead, and Fatty sets off down the hills towards his next adventure.

== Cast ==
- Roscoe "Fatty" Arbuckle as Revenue Agent
- Buster Keaton as Revenue Agent
- Al St. John as Mountain Man
- Alice Lake as Moonshiner's Daughter
- Charles Dudley
- Joe Bordeaux (credited as Joe Bordeau)

== Production ==
It was filmed at the Balboa Amusement Producing Company lot in Long Beach, California.

== Historical significance ==
The film is one of the earliest (if not the earliest) to "break the fourth wall." For example, after Fatty upbraids the heroine and throws her into a river, she emerges and tells him, "I love you!" When her father says, "This is crazy!," Fatty explains, "Look, this is only a two-reeler. We don't have time to build up love scenes."
