= The Fighting Grin =

1918 film

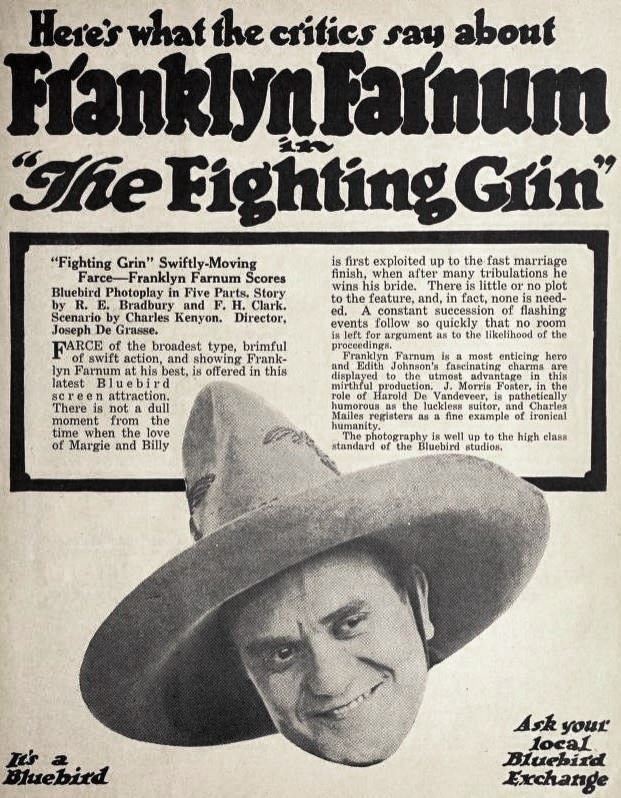
- Directed by: Joseph De Grasse
- Written by: Robert N. Bradbury; Frank Howard Clark; Charles Kenyon
- Starring: Franklyn Farnum; Edith Johnson; J. Morris Foster
- Cinematography: Jack MacKenzie
- Production company: Universal Pictures
- Distributed by: Universal Pictures
- Release date: January 28, 1918
- Running time: 50 minutes
- Country: United States
- Languages: Silent; English intertitles

The Fighting Grin is a 1918 American silent comedy Western film directed by Joseph De Grasse and starring Franklyn Farnum, Edith Johnson and J. Morris Foster.

== Cast ==
- Franklyn Farnum as Billy Kennedy
- Edith Johnson as Margie Meredith
- J. Morris Foster as Harold De Vanderveer
- Charles Hill Mailes as Otis Kennedy
- Fred Montague as Amos Meredith
