= Hello, 'Frisco =

1924 film

- Directed by: Slim Summerville
- Produced by: Carl Laemmle
- Starring: Slim Summerville; Bobby Dunn
- Distributed by: Universal Pictures
- Release date: September 29, 1924
- Running time: 10 minutes
- Country: United States
- Language: Silent (English intertitles)

Hello, 'Frisco is a 1924 American silent short comedy film directed by Slim Summerville and starring Summerville, Bobby Dunn, a host of famous film actors of the era including the canine star Rin Tin Tin. It was produced and distributed by Universal Pictures.

== Plot ==
This summary of the plot was filed with the original copyright application at the Library of Congress:

Unable to find work on the Universal lot, Slim and Bobby gets jobs as camermen to photograph the stars and notables at the Wampas Ball in "Frisco. Slim encounters considerable difficulty with the collapsible legs of the tripod, and Bobby's insistent attempts to horn into the picture with Antonio Moreno, Wanda Wiley Bryant Washbur, William Duncan, Edith Johnson, Norman Kerry, Hoot Gibson, William Desmond, Hobart Hosworth, Jack Hoxie, William S. Hart, Bebe Daniels, Jackie Coogan, Anna Q. Wilson, J. Warren Kerrigan, Syd Chaplin, Ham Hamilton, Bull Montana, Barbar LaMarr, Lew Cody, Fred Niblo, Enid Bennett, Ralph Lewis and Elliott Dexter. Eventually, they find the camera has not been loaded, and, while attempting to put in a roll of negative, the film falls and rolls down hill. Ignited by a carelessly dropped match, it burns up and almost blows the two into midair. Later, the camera slides down the hill, hitting a traffic cop, who chases them into an outwardbound ferry. They return at last to Universal City with nothing to show for their trip but a demolished camera.

== Cast ==
- Slim Summerville as Slim
- Bobby Dunn as Bobby
- James Rolph Jr. as Mayor of San Francisco (as himself)
- Antonio Moreno as himself
- Wanda Wiley as herself
- Bryant Washburn as himself
- William Duncan as himself
- Edith Johnson as herself
- Norman Kerry as himself
- Hoot Gibson as himself
- William Desmond as himself
- Hobart Bosworth as himself
- Jack Hoxie as himself
- William S. Hart as himself
- Bebe Daniels as herself
- Jackie Coogan as himself
- Anna Q. Nilsson as herself
- J. Warren Kerrigan as himself
- Sydney Chaplin as himself
- Lloyd Hamilton as himself
- Barbara La Marr as herself
- Lew Cody as himself
- Fred Niblo as himself
- Belle Bennett as herself
- Ralph Lewis as himself
- Elliott Dexter as himself
- Rin Tin Tin as himself

== See also ==
- A Trip to Paramountown (1922)
- Hollywood (1923)
- Souls for Sale (1923)
- Mary of the Movies (1924)
- Fascinating Youth (1926)
- Show People (1928)
- Hoot Gibson filmography
