= The Fighting Trail =

1917 film

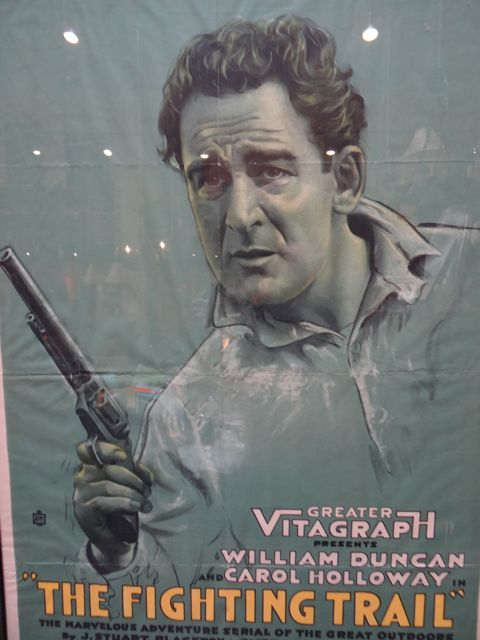
- Film poster
- Directed by: William Duncan
- Written by: Edward J. Montagne; Garfield Thompson
- Based on: screen story by Cyrus Townsend Brady and J. Stuart Blackton
- Produced by: Vitagraph Company of America
- Starring: William Duncan
- Distributed by: Vitagraph Company of America
- Release date: September 10, 1917
- Running time: 15 chapters (31 reels)
- Country: United States
- Languages: Silent; English intertitles

The Fighting Trail is a lost 1917 American silent Western serial film directed by and starring William Duncan. It was produced and distributed by the Vitagraph Company of America. It was released in 15 chapters.

== Plot ==
As described in a film magazine, a valuable mineral, found in only one California mine, is necessary in the manufacture of a new explosive and is desired by the Central Powers. The secret is described in papers held by Nan (Holloway) who is repeatedly captured by the henchmen of German spy Von Bleck (Rogers) and rescued by mining engineer John Gwynn (Duncan).

== Cast ==
- William Duncan as John Gwynn
- Carol Holloway as Nan
- George Holt as "Cut Deep" Rawls
- Joe Ryan as "Shoestring"
- Walter Rodgers as Von Bleck
- Fred Burns

uncredited

- Tote Du Crow
- S. E. Jennings
- George Kunkel
- Otto Lederer
- Charles Wheelock as Don Carlos Yberra

== Chapter titles ==
1. The Priceless Ingredient
2. The Story of Ybarra
3. Will Yaqui Joe Tell?
4. The Other Half
5. Torrent Rush
6. The Ledge of Despair
7. The Lion's Prey
8. The Strands of Doom
9. The Bridge of Death
10. The Sheriff
11. Parched Trails
12. The Desert of Torture
13. The Water Trap
14. The Trestle of Horrors
15. Out of the Flame

== Reception ==
Like many American films of the time, The Fighting Trail was subject to cuts by city and state film censorship boards. The Chicago Board of Censors required these cuts in the following serial chapters:

- Chapter 1: stealing suitcase from Berth, three holdup scenes in Ybarro's house, ransacking chest, and muffling girl
- Chapter 2: shorten two gambling scenes, intertitle "I told her you offered to buy her, because you did not wish to marry her", binding Indian to tree, striking Indian on head, and choking Indian
- Chapter 3: two closeup scenes of threatening Indian with dagger at breast, burning torch near Indian's feet, shooting at Indian, striking Indian on head, Gwynn shooting man, shooting Indian, five scenes of man ransacking house, and intertitle "Ybarro's soul is in hell - let's give his body a taste of the same climate"
- Chapter 4: two closeups of Gwynn binding Von Bleck's head with straps, and five holdup scenes in reel 2
- Chapter 5: attack on old man by Deep Cut's gang, muffling girl and carrying her into room, holdup of Gwynn, and Deep Cut threatening Gwynn with gun
- Chapter 6: no cuts reported
- Chapter 7: three scenes of holdup of Gwynn
- Chapter 8: intertitles "If you forget to serve the warrant your election is assured" and "They have gone to serve the warrant", bribing sheriff, sheriff warning Von Bleck, holdup of Gwynn, binding Gwynn and Casey to post, Deep Cut taking papers from man's pocket, and binding of Nan's hands
- Chapter 9: intertitles "This is where you come in, Sheriff" and "And if you fall down I have sixty bottles of nitroglycerin," two scenes of blocking road, and in reel 2 the shooting of guard in car, taking satchel, throwing nitroglycerin at car, and three holdup scenes;
- Chapter 10: intertitle "Drop that gun - watch the man in that tower bite the dust", three scenes of shooting and man falling from tower, two other scenes of men falling from tower after being shot, three intertitles "I need all the votes you can slip in - straight or crooked", "Don't celebrate - you can blow 'em all up to the moon", and "We've got it planted with dynamite from one end to the other", and all scenes of planting dynamite, crossing wires, and blowing up mines;
- Chapter 11: three closeups of gunfight between Gwynn's men and outlaws, attack on and abduction of girl, three scenes of holdup of driver and wagon, closeup of gun pressed to man's side, outlaw forcing man in wagon to drive faster, closeup of outlaw and Gwynn fighting on floor just before the former is shot, intertitle "I'll drop him in his tracks if you make a sound", man shooting Gwynn, Gwynn shooting man in ambush, binding of girl, binding girl's hands to saddle, shooting Gwynn from horse, binding Gwynn, all scenes of tying Gwynn to tail of horse, horse dragging Gwynn, and intertitle "You've had a hard time coming, but you'll have a harder time going back";
- Chapter 12: Reel 1, three closeups of woman dancing on table, Reel 4, portion of letter referring to young woman's chastity, closeup of silencer on gun, two scenes of armed men outside window, entire scene of jail delivery, the intertitle "Should the guards resist" etc., Reel 3, four scenes of outlaws shooting at dancers in hotel and scene in hotel of dead bodies after shooting, the intertitle "By blowing up the dam" etc., closeup of sticks of dynamite, placing dynamite in wall of bridge, setting wires, two closeups of sawing cables, and pressing the button to set off explosion;
- Chapter 13: the shooting of a man and man falling out of a tower;
- Chapter 14: intertitle "For the price of a few bottles of mescal we can get enough glycerin to blow up the trestle", two views of placing dynamite on trestle, and firing at dynamite on bridge;
- Chapter 15: Reel 1, shooting man from roof, shooting man from horse, two scenes of men falling after shooting, the intertitle "We will clean up the town" etc., shooting up the saloon, Reel 2, the intertitle "This is Deep Cut Rawls talking. We have cleaned up the town." etc., eight riotous scenes between citizens and outlaws and flash the remainder, and five riotous scenes between soldiers and outlaws and flash the remainder.
