= William McCall (actor) =

American actor (1870–1938)

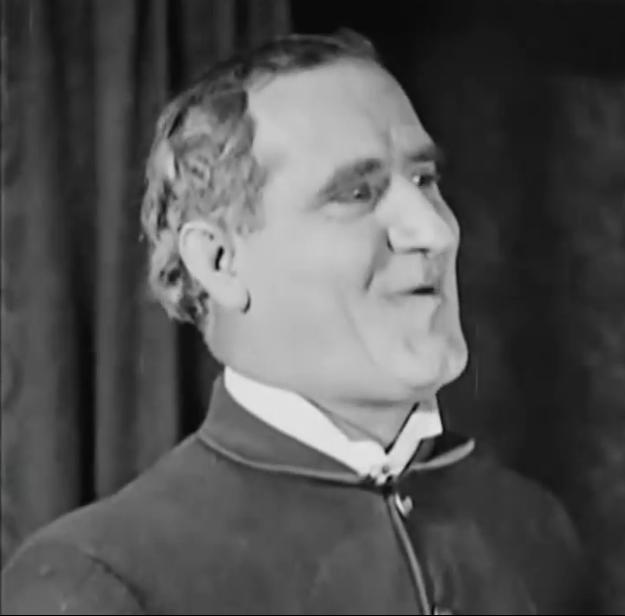
- McCall in Frauds and Frenzies (1918)
- Born: May 19, 1870; Delavan, Illinois, US
- Died: January 10, 1938 (aged 67); Hollywood, California, US
- Years active: 1918–1938

William McCall (May 19, 1870 – January 10, 1938), was an American film actor. He appeared in more than 190 films between 1918 and 1938. He was born in Delavan, Illinois, and died in Hollywood, California.

McCall acted on stage before he began working in film for Vitagraph. During his early film activity he was credited as Billy McCall, and he performed primarily in comic roles in farces, including Huns and Hyphens (1918) and Frauds and Frenzies (1918). Later, as William McCall, he acted in serials and Westerns. He continued in films through the introduction of sound, ending his career in 1937.

== Selected filmography ==
- Huns and Hyphens (1918)
- Bears and Bad Men (1918)
- Frauds and Frenzies (1918)
- Smashing Barriers (1919)
- Flower of the North (1921)
- Where Men Are Men (1921)
- The Flower of the North (1921)
- The Little Minister (1922)
- Fortune's Mask (1922)
- Across the Border (1922)
- The Counter Jumper (1922)
- The Snowshoe Trail (1922)
- The Fighting Guide (1922)
- The Angel of Crooked Street (1922)
- When Danger Smiles (1922)
- The Phantom Horseman (1924)
- Wanted by the Law (1924)
- The Back Trail (1924)
- The Red Rider (1925)
- Ridin' Thunder (1925)
- Flirty Four-Flushers (1926)
- His First Flame (1927)
- Trailing Trouble (1930)
- Under Texas Skies (1930)
- The Lonesome Trail (1930)
- Hidden Valley (1932)
- Circle Canyon (1933)
- Breed of the Border (1933)
- Big Calibre (1935)
- The Last of the Clintons (1935)
- Lightning Triggers (1935)
- The Speed Reporter (1936)
