= The Saddle Hawk =

1925 film directed by Edward Sedgwick

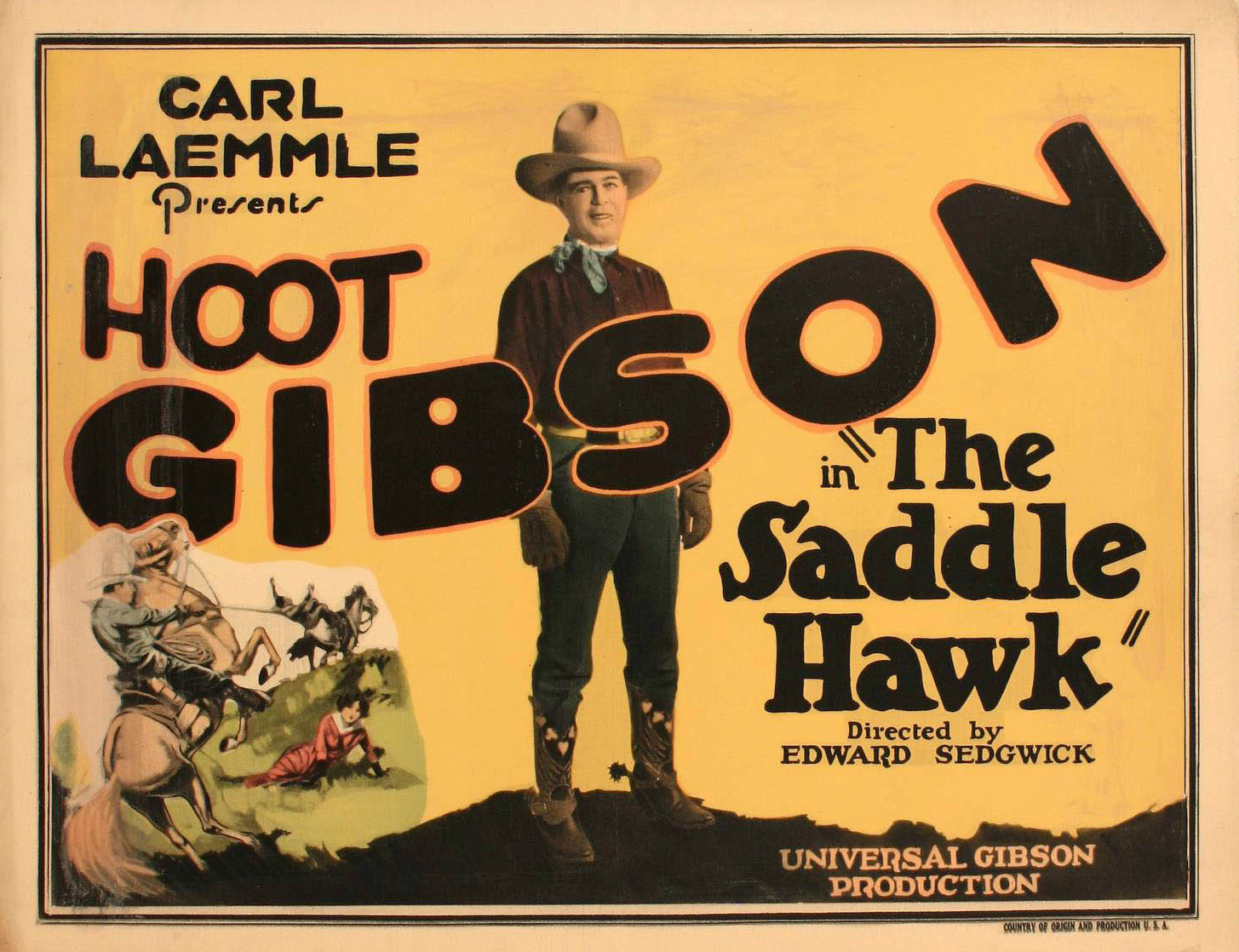
- Lobby card
- Directed by: Edward Sedgwick
- Written by: Eddie Sedgwick and Raymond L. Schrock
- Story by: Eddie Sedgwick and Raymond L. Schrock
- Produced by: Carl Laemmle
- Starring: Hoot Gibson
- Cinematography: Virgil Miller
- Distributed by: Universal Pictures
- Release date: March 8, 1925
- Running time: 6 reels
- Country: United States
- Languages: Silent; English intertitles

The Saddle Hawk is a lost 1925 American silent Western film directed by Edward Sedgwick and starring Hoot Gibson. It was produced and distributed by Universal Pictures.

== Plot ==
As described in a film magazine, Ben Johnson (Gibson), a despised sheepherder, works for an old Mexican, but is unhappy because he loves cattle and wants to be a cowboy. Riding to town one day, he sees a Rena (Nixon) and asks for a drink which she refuses to give him because she is a cattleman's daughter with cattle owners’ prejudices. The next day several men go looking for this young woman from her father's ranch. They visit Ben's employer while Ben is away. When Ben returns, his boss gives him a beautiful golden mare, hat, and other necessities to bedeck him for real riding. Then he tells Ben to visit the very young woman who had slighted him the prior day, and take her to her father. As Ben arrives, a neighboring bad man is wooing her over-strenuously. Ben knocks him out, and drives him off. Rena agrees to go with Ben. The next morning, camping near a stream, Ben is shot at, but gets his attacker, the bad man. Being pursued, they separate and she is found by the first two who originally wanted her. Ben joins up with Buck Brent (Campeau), a bad man who hates the young woman's father, Jim Newhall (French), because he had once sent him to jail. Ben follows the trail and arrives at Brent's place, defying death at every turn. They accept him after putting him to a rigorous test. On a cattle raid to get Newhall's steers, Ben falls and is captured. Once before Newhall, he communicates some interesting information. Immediately, Newhall organizes a raid. Ben rescues Rena and Brent is shot.

== Cast ==
- Hoot Gibson as Ben Johnson
- Marian Nixon as Rena Newhall
- G. Raymond Nye as Zach Marlin
- Josie Sedgwick as Mercedes
- Charles K. French as Jim Newhall
- Tote Du Crow as Vasquez
- Fred Humes as Draw Collins
- William Steele as Steve Kern
- Frank Campeau as Buck Brent

== See also ==
- Hoot Gibson filmography
