= Malvina Polo =

American actress (1903–2000)

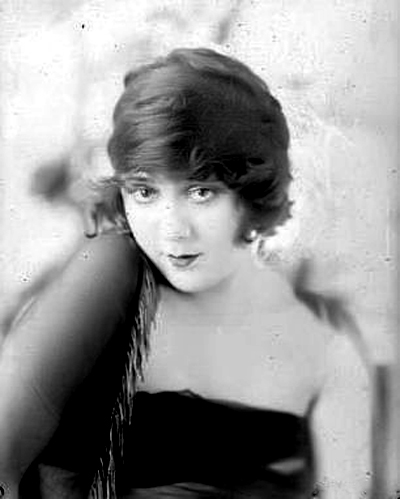
- Polo in the 1920s
- Born: July 26, 1903; U.S.
- Died: January 6, 2000 (aged 96); San Juan Capistrano, California, U.S.
- Occupation: Actress
- Years active: 1921–1924
- Father: Eddie Polo

Malvina Polo (July 26, 1903 – January 6, 2000) was an American film actress and concert pianist. She appeared in five films, all early in the 1920s. Some of her films were made abroad. She also performed on stage.

Polo was the daughter of actor Eddie Polo and actress Alice Finch. She married Jeronimo "Carlos" Quiroga, brother of Alex Romero, whom she met while filming in 1924. Polo gave up her acting career after marriage and supported her husband between his choreography work by sewing costumes for the Ice Follies.

She died in San Juan Capistrano, California.

== Selected filmography ==
Publicity photo with Eileen Sedgwick, Eddie Polo, and Malvina Polo

- The Yellow Streak (1921)
- Foolish Wives (1922)
- Der Fluch der Habgier (1922)
- A Woman of Paris (1923) directed by Charles Chaplin
- Wolves of the North (1924)
