= Wide Open Spaces (1924 film) =

1924 film

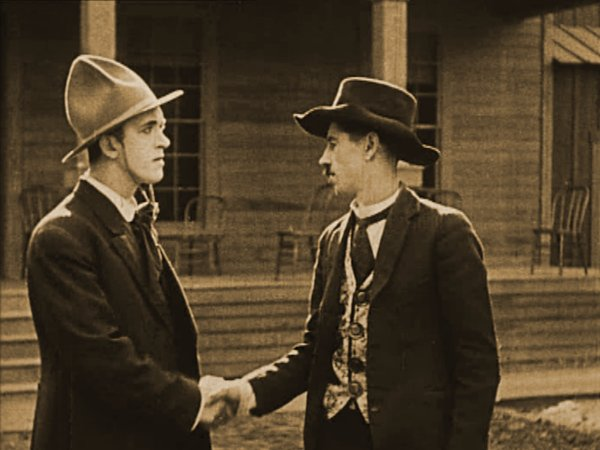
- Stan Laurel And George Rowe in Wide Open Spaces
- Directed by: George Jeske
- Written by: H. M. Walker
- Produced by: Hal Roach
- Starring: Stan Laurel
- Cinematography: Frank Young
- Edited by: Thomas J. Crizer
- Release date: July 6, 1924
- Running time: 20 minutes
- Country: United States
- Language: Silent (English intertitles)

First reel of Wide Open Spaces

Wide Open Spaces is a 1924 American silent comedy film starring Stan Laurel. It is a parody of the 1923 film Wild Bill Hickok and its original title was Wild Bill Hiccough. Gabriel Goober thwarts a stagecoach robbery by Jack McQueen and his gang.

== Cast ==
- Stan Laurel as Gabriel Goober
- Ena Gregory
- James Finlayson as Jack McQueen
- George Rowe
- Noah Young
- Sammy Brooks
- Billy Engle as Phil Sheridan
- Charles Dudley as Abraham Lincoln
- Al Forbes as George Armstrong Custer
- Mae Laurel as Calamity Jane
