= J. Morris Foster =

American actor (1881–1966)

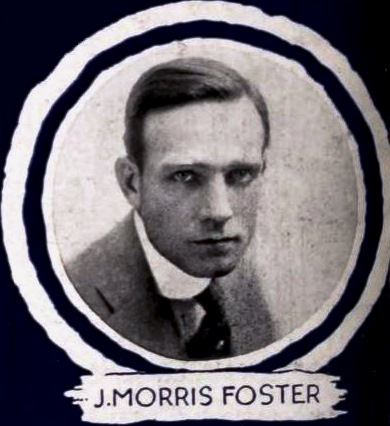
- Exhibitors Herald, 1921
- Born: September 9, 1881; Foxbert, Pennsylvania, United States
- Died: April 24, 1966 (aged 84); Burbank, California, United States
- Years active: 1914-1923
- Spouse: Mignon Anderson (1915-1966)

J. Morris Foster (September 9, 1881 – April 24, 1966) was an American actor of the silent era. He appeared in more than 70 films between 1914 and 1923. He was born in Foxbert, Pennsylvania and died in Burbank, California.

== Selected filmography ==
- The Gray Ghost (1917)
- The Secret Man (1917)
- High Speed (1917)
- Beloved Jim (1917)
- All the World to Nothing (1918)
- The Voice of Destiny (1918)
- The Fighting Grin (1918)
- Who Cares? (1919)
- Overland Red (1920)
- Sundown Slim (1920)
- The Blue Fox (1921)
- Nan of the North (1922)
- The Silent Vow (1922)
- The Gunfighter (1923)
- Two Fisted Justice (1924)
