= Henry Herbert (actor) =

English actor and producer

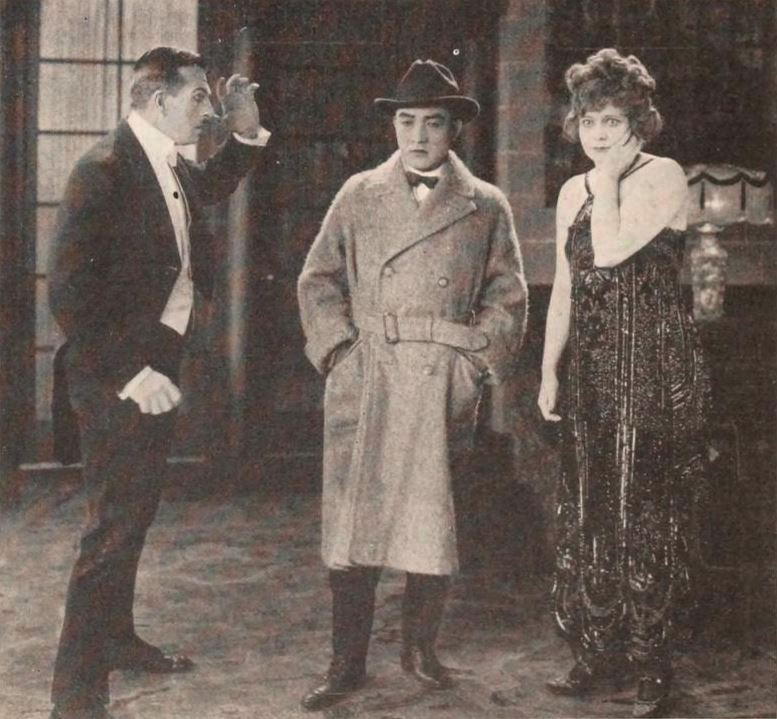
- Still of Herbert (left) with Sessue Hayakawa and Myrtle Stedman in Black Roses, 1921
- Born: 1879
- Died: 20 February 1947
- Occupation(s): film, stage actor and producer

Henry Herbert (c. 1879 – 20 February 1947) was an English film, stage actor and producer, who became well known in the United States.

== Biography ==
Herbert appears to have commenced his early career with Ben Greet's Company, and with Sir Frank Benson; for some years he managed Benson's No.2 Company on tour, as well as playing leading parts. On 22 April 1911, he directed Basil Rathbone in his first appearance on stage at the Theatre Royal, Ipswich, as Hortensio in The Taming of the Shrew.

In 1912 he went to the U.S. and appeared at the Lyceum Theatre (New York) on 9 September as Captain Jeyes in The 'Mind-the-Paint' Girl, and from March to May 1916 he appeared (with Sir Herbert Tree) at the New Amsterdam Theatre, New York, as Griffith and the Jester in Shakespeare's King Henry VIII, Tubal in The Merchant of Venice, and Dr. Caius in The Merry Wives of Windsor.

He took up residence at 16 Gramercy Park, New York City, and became solely engaged on the American stage thereafter both as an actor and a producer, with an impressive career.

Herbert is likely to have also worked in film, credited as Henry Hebert.

== Partial filmography ==
- A Man of Sorrow (1916)
- The Fires of Conscience (1916)
- The Silent Partner (1917)
- The Hidden Children (1917)
- The Ghosts of Yesterday (1918)
- La Tosca (1918)(*as Henry Hebert)
- When Fate Decides (1919)
- Rose of the West (1919)
- The Cyclone (1920)
- Her Elephant Man (1920)
- Twins of Suffering Creek (1920)
- Black Roses (1921)
- Blind Hearts (1921)
- No Defense (1921)
- The Little Minister (1922)
- Little Wildcat (1922)
- My Wild Irish Rose (1922)
- The Silent Vow (1922)
- When Danger Smiles (1922)
- The Day of Faith (1923)
- So Big (1924)
- Stolen Secrets (1924)
- Daughters of Today (1924)
- The Enchanted Hill (1925)
- The Blue Streak (1926)
- The Mystery Club (1926)
- One Chance in a Million (1927)
- The Girl from Rio (1927)
- The Charge of the Gauchos (1928)
- Fangs of Fate (1928)
- Laddie Be Good (1928)
- The Wright Idea (1928)
- Their Own Desire (1929)
- Easy Money (1936)
