= Little Robinson Crusoe =

1924 film by Edward F. Cline

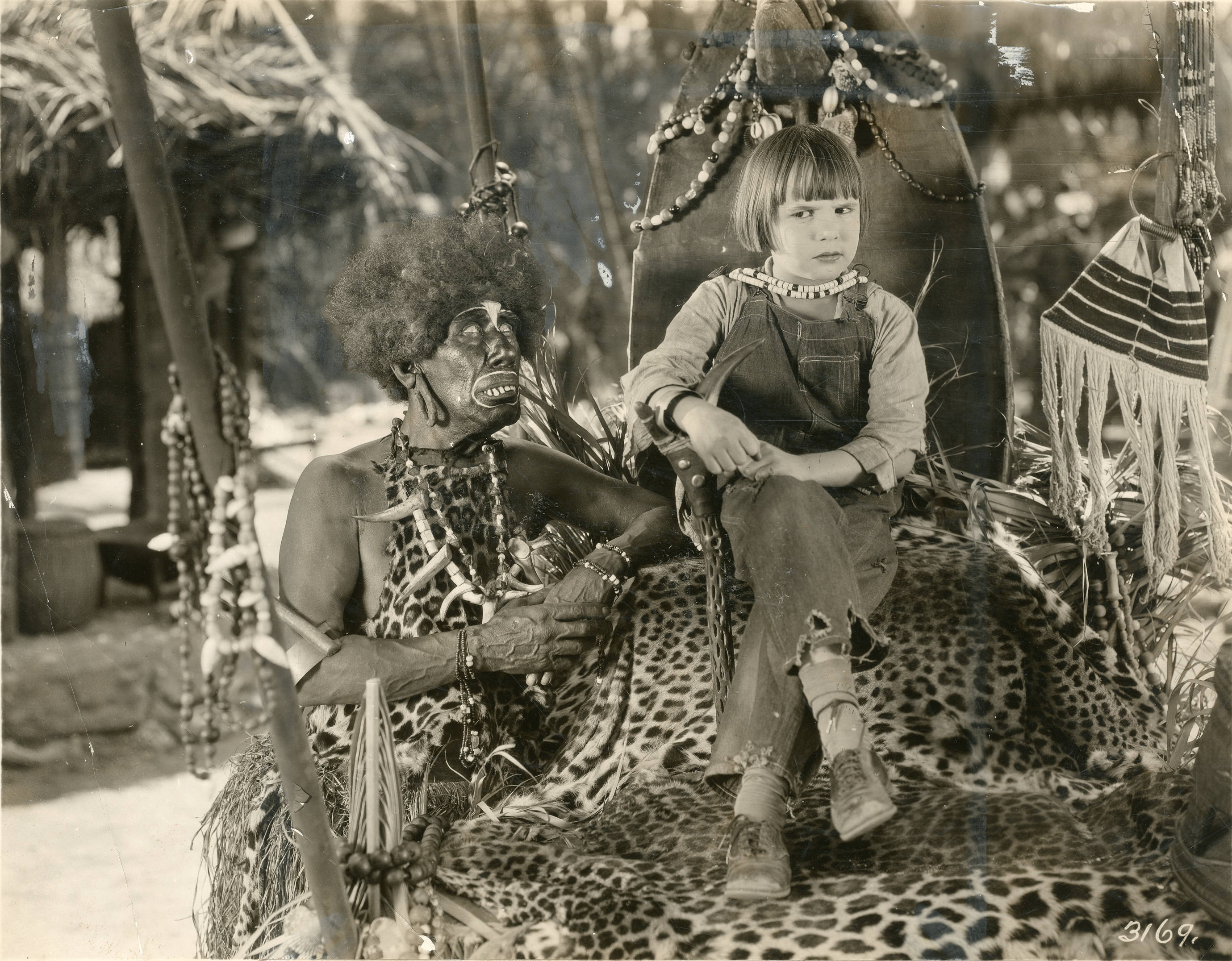
- Still with Tote Du Crow and Jackie Coogan
- Directed by: Edward F. Cline
- Written by: Willard Mack
- Starring: Jackie Coogan
- Cinematography: Frank B. Good; Robert Martin
- Distributed by: Metro-Goldwyn-Mayer
- Release date: August 25, 1924
- Running time: 70 minutes
- Country: United States
- Language: Silent (English intertitles)

Little Robinson Crusoe is a 1924 American silent comedy film starring Jackie Coogan. The film was directed by Edward F. Cline and written by Willard Mack.

== Plot ==
A clip from the film.

Mickey Hogan is an orphan cabin boy on a ship commanded by a cruel captain. His only friend is a black cat, called Man Friday. A storm shipwrecks Mickey on an island, where is made into a captive war god. The next island is run by a white man Adolphe Schmidt, who lives there with his daughter Gretta.

== Cast ==
- Jackie Coogan as Mickey Hogan
- Chief Daniel J. O'Brien as Chief of Police
- Will Walling as Captain of Police
- Tom Santschi as Captain Dynes
- Clarence Wilson as 'Singapore' Scroggs
- Eddie Boland as Wireless Operator
- Noble Johnson as Marimba (cannibal chief)
- Tote Du Crow as Ugandi Medicine Man
- Bert Sprotte as Adolphe Schmidt
- Gloria Grey as Gretta Schmidt

== Preservation ==
A copy of Little Robinson Crusoe is housed at the Gosfilmofond in Moscow.
