= The Fast Express =

1924 film

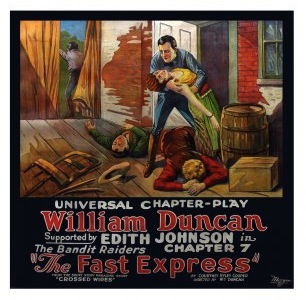
- Film poster
- Directed by: William Duncan
- Written by: Paul M. Bryan; Karl R. Coolidge; Courtney Ryley Cooper; George H. Plympton
- Starring: William Duncan; Edith Johnson
- Distributed by: Universal Pictures
- Release date: March 10, 1924
- Running time: 15 episodes
- Country: United States
- Language: Silent (English intertitles)

The Fast Express is a 1924 American drama film serial directed by and starring William Duncan. The film is considered to be lost, though a "fragmentary print" exists.

== Cast ==
- William Duncan as Brent McAdams
- Edith Johnson as Lucille Worth
- Edward Cecil as Christopher Langley
- Eva Gordon as Rita
- James Welsh as Theobold Mason (as Jim Welsh)
- Albert J. Smith as Edward Winston
- Harry Woods as Tom Boyd
- Joe Dominguez as Black Tony
- John Cossar
- Harry Carter
- Mabel Randall

== Chapter titles ==
1. Facing the Crisis
2. Vanishing Diamonds
3. Woman of Mystery
4. Haunted House
5. Perils of the City
6. Cipher Message
7. Bandit Raiders
8. Impostor's Scheme
9. Falsely Accused
10. Path of Danger
11. The Abduction
12. The Trial Run
13. The False Summons
14. Black Treasure
15. Retribution

== See also ==
- List of American films of 1924
- List of film serials
- List of film serials by studio
