= Playing It Wild =

1923 film

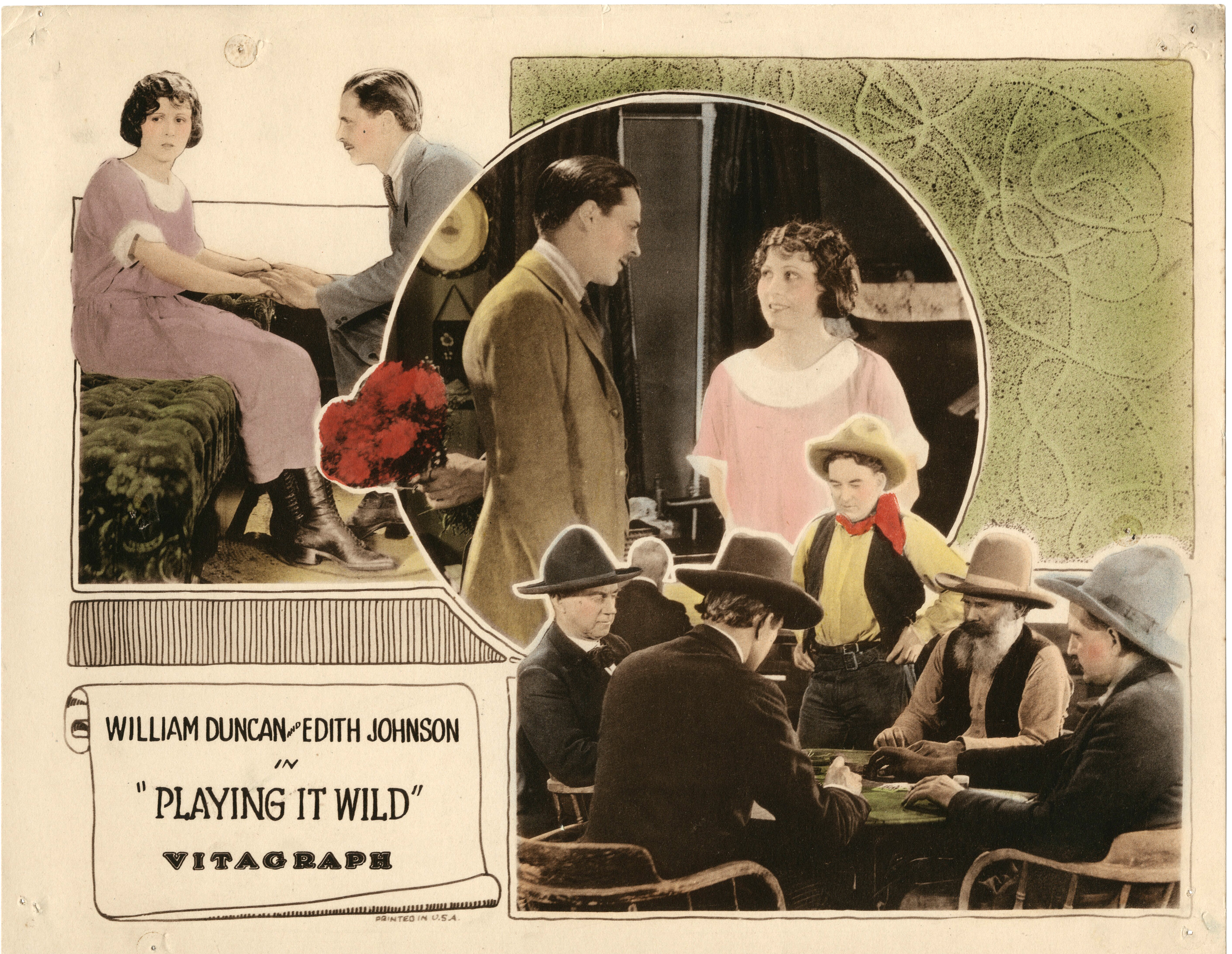
- Directed by: William Duncan
- Written by: C. Graham Baker
- Produced by: Albert E. Smith
- Starring: William Duncan; Edith Johnson; Francis Powers
- Cinematography: George Robinson
- Production company: Vitagraph Company of America
- Distributed by: Vitagraph Company of America
- Release date: April 19, 1923
- Running time: 60 minutes
- Country: United States
- Languages: Silent; English intertitles

Playing It Wild is a 1923 American silent Western film directed by William Duncan and starring Duncan, Edith Johnson and Francis Powers.

== Cast ==
- William Duncan as Jerry Hoskins
- Edith Johnson as Beth Webb
- Francis Powers as Old Man Webb
- Dick La Reno as Sheriff Gideon
- Edmund Cobb as Christ Gideon, His Son
- Frank Beal as Wetherby, a Painter
- Frank Wood as Bill Rucker

== Bibliography ==
- Buck Rainey. Sweethearts of the sage: biographies and filmographies of 258 actresses appearing in western movies. McFarland & Company Incorporated Pub, 1992.
