= George Robinson (cinematographer) =

American cinematographer (1890-1958)

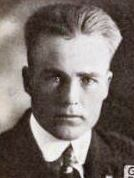
- Born: George Hiram Robinson; April 2, 1890; United States
- Died: August 30, 1958 (aged 68); Los Angeles, California
- Occupations: Cinematographer, actor

George Hiram Robinson (1890-1958) was an American cinematographer from Los Angeles.

== Biography ==
George Robinson was born on April 2, 1890.

He died in Los Angeles on August 30, 1958, and was buried at Pomona Cemetery.

== Selected filmography ==
- Where Men Are Men (1921)
- Steelheart (1921)
- A Guilty Conscience (1921)
- No Defense (1921)
- The Silent Vow (1922)
- Restless Souls (1922)
- When Danger Smiles (1922)
- The Fighting Guide (1922)
- Playing It Wild (1923)
- The Steel Trail (1923)
- The Tie That Binds (1923)
- The Wrong Mr. Wright (1927)
- A Hero for a Night (1927)
- The Irresistible Lover (1927)
- Phyllis of the Follies (1928)
- Hoofbeats of Vengeance (1928)
- Stop That Man! (1928)
- Guardians of the Wild (1928)
- Wild Blood (1928)
- The Charlatan (1929)
- Plunging Hoofs (1929)
- The Harvest of Hate (1929)
- College Love (1929)
- Hell's Heroes (1929)
- La Voluntad del muerto (1930)
- Dracula (1931)
- East of Borneo (1931)
- The Homicide Squad (1931)
- The Spirit of Notre Dame (1931)
- Racing Youth (1932)
- The All American (1932)
- Once in a Lifetime (1932)
- Nagana (1933)
- Horse Play (1933)
- Her First Mate (1933)
- Love, Honor, and Oh Baby! (1933)
- Half a Sinner (1934)
- Cross Country Cruise (1934)
- Glamour (1934)
- Great Expectations (1934)
- Million Dollar Ransom (1934)
- Strange Wives (1934)
- I Give My Love (1934)
- The Poor Rich (1934)
- Gift of Gab (1934)
- The Mystery of Edwin Drood (1935)
- King Solomon of Broadway (1935)
- Mister Dynamite (1935)
- It Happened in New York (1935)
- Diamond Jim (1935)
- Chinatown Squad (1935)
- Three Kids and a Queen (1935)
- The Invisible Ray (1936)
- Postal Inspector (1936)
- Dracula's Daughter (1936)
- Easy to Take (1936)
- Parole! (1936)
- Sutter's Gold (1936)
- When's Your Birthday? (1937)
- Some Blondes Are Dangerous (1937)
- Night Key (1937)
- Carnival Queen (1937)
- Reported Missing! (1937)
- The Road Back (1937)
- You're a Sweetheart (1937)
- The Man Who Cried Wolf (1937)
- The Man in Blue (1937)
- Goodbye Broadway (1938)
- Sinners in Paradise (1938)
- The Road to Reno (1938)
- Wives Under Suspicion (1938)
- Young Fugitives (1938)
- Service de Luxe (1938)
- Little Tough Guys in Society (1938)
- Unexpected Father (1939)
- Son of Frankenstein (1939)
- East Side of Heaven (1939)
- One Hour to Live (1939)
- Charlie McCarthy, Detective (1939)
- Tower of London (1939)
- The Sun Never Sets (1939)
- If I Had My Way (1940)
- The Son of Monte Cristo (1940)
- Treat 'Em Rough (1942)
- Give Out, Sisters (1942)
- Behind the Eight Ball (1942)
- The Mummy's Tomb (1942)
- Eyes of the Underworld (1942)
- The Falcon Takes Over (1942)
- Top Sergeant (1942)
- Madame Spy (1942)
- The Great Impersonation (1942)
- Drums of the Congo (1942)
- Sin Town (1942)
- When Johnny Comes Marching Home (1942)
- Overland Mail (1942)
- It Comes Up Love (1943)
- Frankenstein Meets the Wolf Man (1943)
- Rhythm of the Islands (1943)
- Mister Big (1943)
- Captive Wild Woman (1943)
- Get Going (1943)
- Son of Dracula (1943)
- Ali Baba and the Forty Thieves (1944)
- Cobra Woman (1944)
- The Scarlet Claw (1944)
- Allergic to Love (1944)
- Gypsy Wildcat (1944)
- Murder in the Blue Room (1944)
- House of Frankenstein (1944)
- Destiny (1944)
- Here Come the Co-eds (1945)
- Sudan (1945)
- The Naughty Nineties (1945)
- House of Dracula (1945)
- Frontier Gal (1945)
- The Scarlet Horseman (1946)
- The Cat Creeps (1946)
- Idea Girl (1946)
- The Runaround (1946)
- She Wrote the Book (1946)
- Slightly Scandalous (1946)
- Linda, Be Good (1947)
- The Exile (1947)
- Slave Girl (1947)
- Heading for Heaven (1947)
- Open Secret (1948)
- The Challenge (1948)
- Blonde Ice (1948)
- 13 Lead Soldiers (1948)
- Walk a Crooked Mile (1948)
- The Creeper (1938)
- The Vicious Circle (1948)
- Free for All (1949)
- Abbott and Costello in the Foreign Legion (1950)
- Abbott and Costello Meet the Invisible Man (1951)
- Tales of Robin Hood (1951)
- Comin' Round the Mountain (1951)
- Jack and the Beanstalk (1952)
- Lost in Alaska (1952)
- Ma and Pa Kettle on Vacation (1953)
- Abbott and Costello Meet Dr. Jekyll and Mr. Hyde (1953)
- The Yellow Mountain (1954)
- Destry (1954)
- Black Horse Canyon (1954)
- Ricochet Romance (1954)
- The Square Jungle (1955)
- Abbott and Costello Meet the Mummy (1955)
- Tarantula! (1955)
- The Toy Tiger (1956)
- Rock, Pretty Baby (1956)
- Dance with Me, Henry (1956)
- The Kettles in the Ozarks (1956)
- Francis in the Haunted House (1956)
- Gun for a Coward (1957)
- The Night Runner (1957)
- Joe Dakota (1957)
