= Wolves of the North =

1924 film

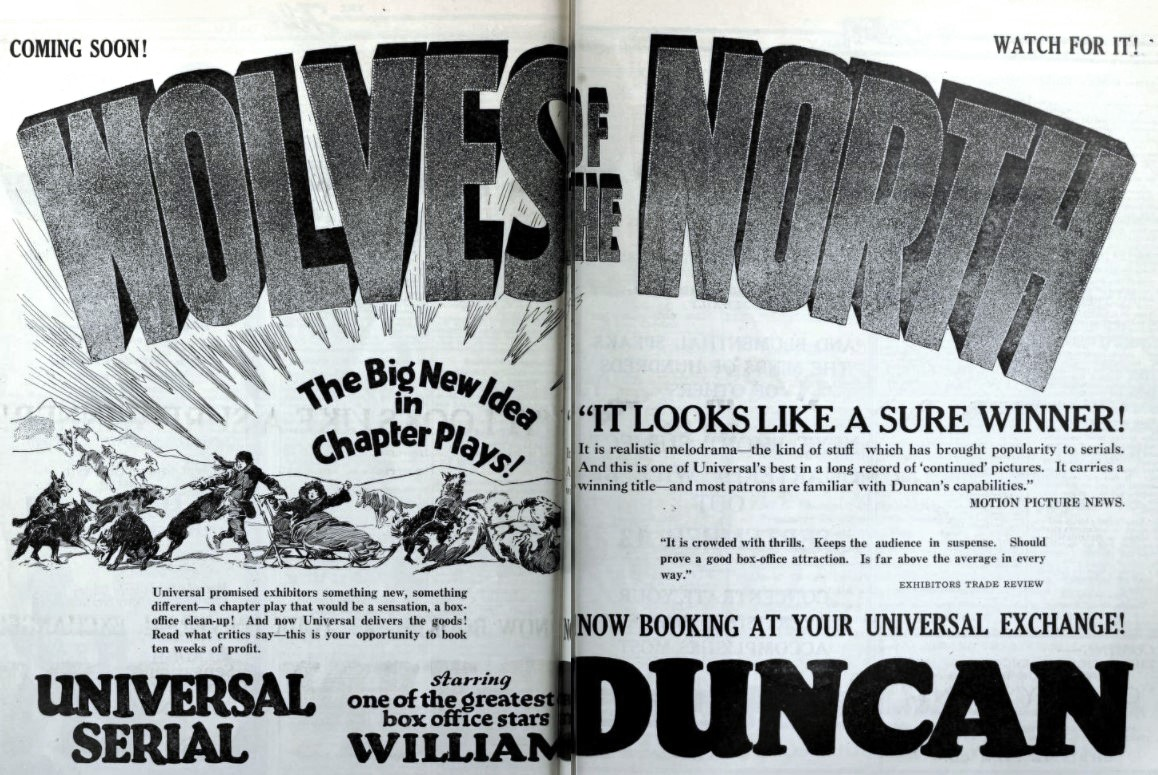
- Advertisement
- Directed by: William Duncan
- Written by: Frank Howard Clark
- Based on: The Free Trader by Katherine Pinkerton and Robert Pinkerton
- Starring: William Duncan; Edith Johnson
- Distributed by: Universal Pictures
- Release date: September 21, 1924
- Running time: 10 episodes
- Country: United States
- Languages: Silent; English intertitles

Wolves of the North is a 1924 American Northern drama film serial directed by and starring William Duncan. This serial is considered to be a lost film.

The working title was The Free Traders and the film featured a polar bear cub named Pluto. Pluto had been “captured by a whaler" and ended up at Los Angeles Harbor where he was acquired by the Universal City Zoo. He played a pet of the "queen of the fur traders" (Esther Ralston).

== Plot ==
As described in a film magazine, Alan Gray (Duncan), free trader, beats up Dan Martin (Rice) and Pierre DuPre (Bonomo), fur pirates, who accuse him of poaching. Grimwood Mears (Comstock), manager of the powerful North Company post, nearly loses his job because of the inroads made on the company's business by the Chester Post, the free trading company operated by Madge Chester (Ralston). Bob Hunter (Woods), manager of the Chester Post, is fired for drunkenness, and tries to abduct Madge, but is beaten up by Alan, whom Madge appoints as Bob's successor. Dan and Pierre rescue Bob from the lockup, steal Madge's furs, take Helen (Johnson), the daughter of Grimwood Mears, and, pursued by Alan, canoe down the rapids. Unable to battle the current, all are hurled over a high waterfall. Alan rescues Helen from the mad torrent after a terrific struggle in the water, and gets her safely ashore. Her father has been reinstated as manager of the post to Henry Allardyce's (Cecil) chagrin. The latter, his repulsive advances having been spurned by Helen, threatens to have his way with her, come what may. Meanwhile, Madge has been unsuccessful in evoking any declaration of love from Alan, but has wormed from him the secret of his mysterious trips to the interior.

Later, Madge accuses Alan of trying to double-cross her by stealing her furs and re-selling them to her. Alan sets out the next day to buy some furs at a distant settlement. Helen hears of the project through underground channels and sets out to beat him to his goal. Her sled overturns and she is attacked by wild wolves. Alan rescues Helen Mears from the wolves and goes on to Eagle Bird's tepee, where he trades for the Indian's furs. Helen has an Indian girl put quinine in the tea Alan has traded for the pelts, the Indians think it is poisoned and attack Alan. Helen, regretting her underhanded trick, saves Alan, and they return to their respective Posts. Alan beats off two fur pirates who have attacked Helen, and they later steal his cached furs in revenge. Joe Peters, accused by Alan's tripper of stealing the furs, stabs his accuser and escapes, pursued by Alan. Helen follows to help Joe escape, but Alan overtakes the fugitive before she catches up. They fight in a small cabin, and, just as Helen arrives, a huge snow slide engulfs the hut. Alan, Joe, and Helen dig their way out of the cabin. Helen accidentally shoots Alan, who fakes a fall and takes her gun away so she cannot rescue Joe. Meanwhile, Madge has told Simon Blake (Homans), a "fence," that Alan Gray is an assumed name. Blake helps her recover the furs stolen from her by pirates. Mears and his men hold-up Alan and release Joe, but Alan pursues him until he loses the trail. He returns to the Post just in time to start off on a race with the rival Post's tripper to get Me Pa See's furs. Alan's sled gets beyond control and he and it top- ple over a steep cliff. Later episodes further describe Alan's adventures and the rivalry between the two trading posts.

== Cast ==
- William Duncan as Alan Gray
- Edith Johnson as Helen Mears
- Joseph W. Girard as John MacLeod
- Clark Comstock as Grimwood Mears
- Esther Ralston as Madge Chester
- Edward Cecil as Henry Allardyce
- Harry Woods as Bob Hunter
- Joe Dominguez as Jerry Snowbird
- Frank Rice as Dan Martin
- Robert Homans as Simon Blake
- Joe Bonomo as Pierre DuPree
- Leo White as Sir Percival Pembroke
- Malvina Polo

== Chapter titles ==
1. The Fur Pirates
2. The Wolf Pack
3. The Avalanche
4. Passions of War
5. The Blizzard
6. Flames of Peril
7. The Man Hunt
8. The Trail of Gold
9. A Trick of Fate
10. The Stolen Map

== See also ==
- List of film serials
- List of film serials by studio
- List of lost films
