= The Steel Trail =

1923 film

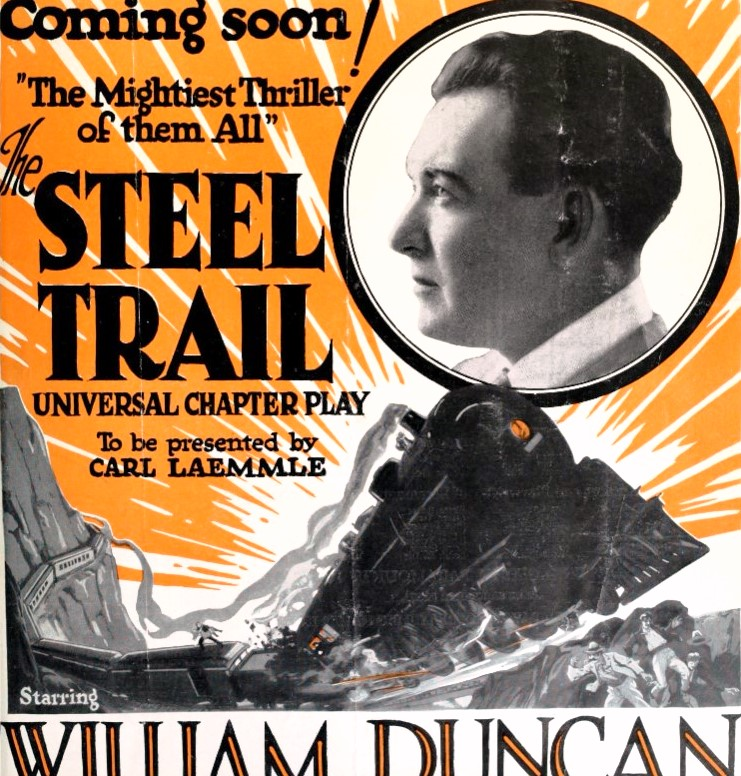
- Advertisement
- Directed by: William Duncan
- Written by: Paul M. Bryan; Karl R. Coolidge; George H. Plympton
- Starring: William Duncan; Edith Johnson
- Cinematography: George Robinson
- Distributed by: Universal Pictures
- Release date: August 27, 1923
- Running time: 15 episodes
- Country: United States
- Language: Silent (English intertitles)

The Steel Trail is a 1923 American drama film serial directed by and starring William Duncan. The serial was produced and distributed by Universal Pictures Corporation The serial was released in Finland beginning 19 May 1929.

== Cast ==
- William Duncan as Bruce Boyd
- Edith Johnson as Judith Armstrong
- Harry Carter as Mark Zabel
- Ralph McCullough as Frank Norton
- Harry Woods as Morris Blake
- John Cossar as Colonel John Armstrong)
- Albert J. Smith as Ralph Dayton
- Janet Ford as Helen Dayton
- Mabel Randall as Anna
- Catherine Doucet as Olga (credited as Catherine Calhoun)

== Chapter titles ==
1. Intrigue
2. Dynamite
3. Wildfire
4. Blown from the Cliff
5. Head On
6. Crushed
7. The Gold Rush
8. Judith's Peril
9. The Dam Bursts
10. The Trap
11. The Fight on the Cliff
12. The Tottering Bridge
13. Between Two Fires
14. Burning Fumes
15. Ten Seconds to Go

== See also ==
- List of film serials
- List of film serials by studio
