= Steelheart (film) =

1921 film

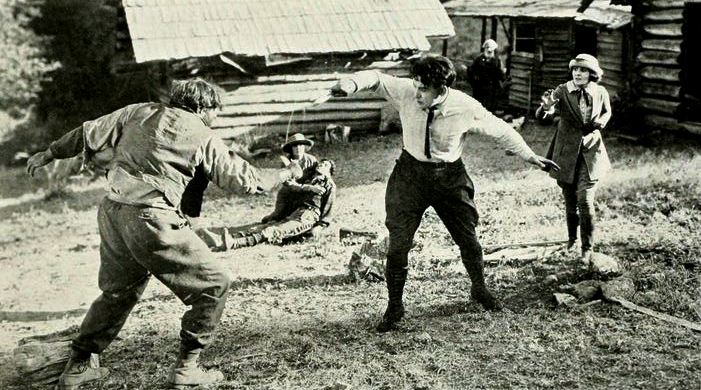
- Theatrical release poster
- Directed by: William Duncan
- Written by: Bradley J. Smollen
- Starring: William Duncan; Edith Johnson; Jack Curtis
- Cinematography: George Robinson
- Production company: Vitagraph Company of America
- Distributed by: Vitagraph Company of America
- Release date: November 6, 1921
- Running time: 60 minutes
- Country: United States
- Languages: Silent; English intertitles

Steelheart is a 1921 American silent Western film directed by William Duncan and starring Duncan, Edith Johnson and Jack Curtis.

== Cast ==
- William Duncan as Frank Worthing
- Edith Johnson as Ethel Kendall
- Jack Curtis as 'Butch' Dorgan
- Walter Rodgers as Steve
- Euna Luckey as Mrs Freeman
- Ardeta Malino as Vera
- Earl Crain as Dick Colter
- Charles Dudley as 'Old Tom' Shelley

== Production ==
Produced under the working title The Superman, exteriors were filmed in Bakersfield, California.

== Bibliography ==
- Langman, Larry. A Guide to Silent Westerns. Greenwood Publishing Group, 1992.
