= The Blue Streak (1926 film) =

1926 film

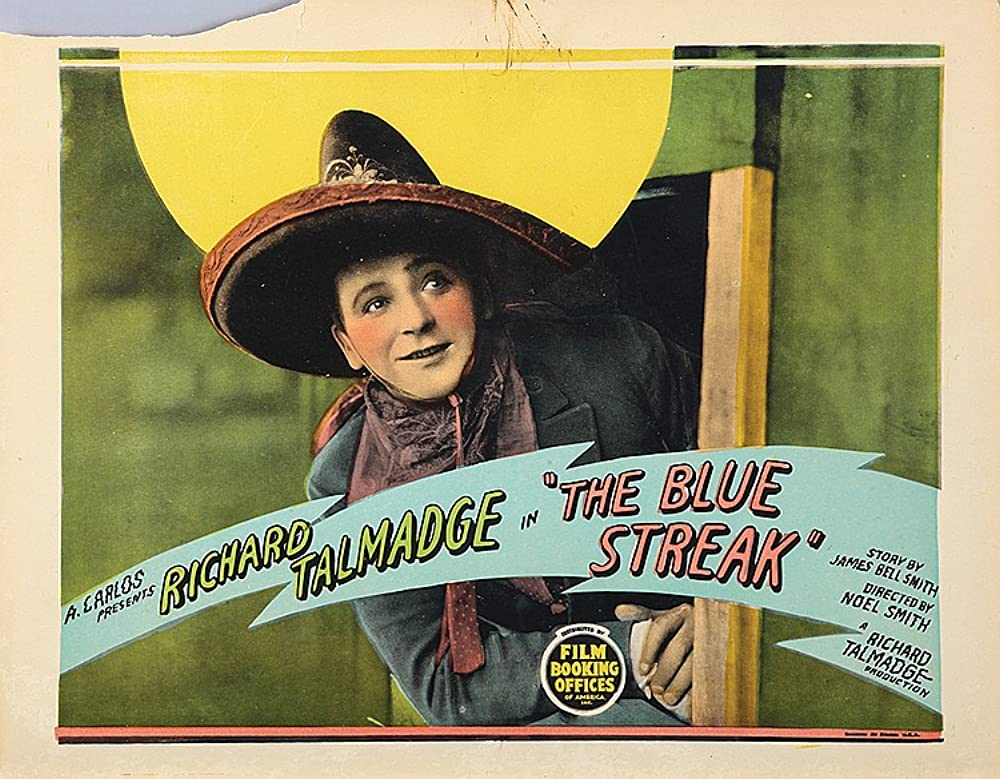
- Lobby card
- Directed by: Noel M. Smith
- Written by: James Bell Smith
- Starring: Richard Talmadge; Charles Clary; Louise Lorraine
- Cinematography: Frank Evans; Jack Stevens
- Edited by: Doane Harrison
- Production companies: Richard Talmadge Productions; Truart Film Corporation
- Distributed by: Film Booking Offices of America
- Release date: January 31, 1926
- Running time: 50 min.
- Country: United States
- Language: Silent (English intertitles)

The Blue Streak is a 1926 American silent romantic adventure film directed by Noel M. Smith and starring Richard Talmadge, Charles Clary, and Louise Lorraine.

== Plot ==
As described in a film magazine review, Richard Manley visits the El Grande mine in Mexico to check his father's interests and renews his acquaintance with Inez Del Rio, a niece of Don Carlos, owner of the mine. Mine superintendent Jack Slade is the rascal responsible for stopping the shipments of ore to Dick's father. Slade plots to remove Dick, who has evidence of Slade's conspiracy, and kidnaps him. However, Dick escapes in time to reach the hacienda and rescue the Don and Inez from Slade. Dick then constitutes himself to be the protector of Inez for life.

== Cast ==
- Richard Talmadge as Richard Manley
- Charles Clary as John Manley
- Louise Lorraine as Inez Del Rio
- Henry Hebert as Jack Slade
- Charles Hill Mailes as Don Carlos
- Victor Dillingham as Slade's Assistant
- Tote Du Crow as Pedro
