= No Defense (1921 film) =

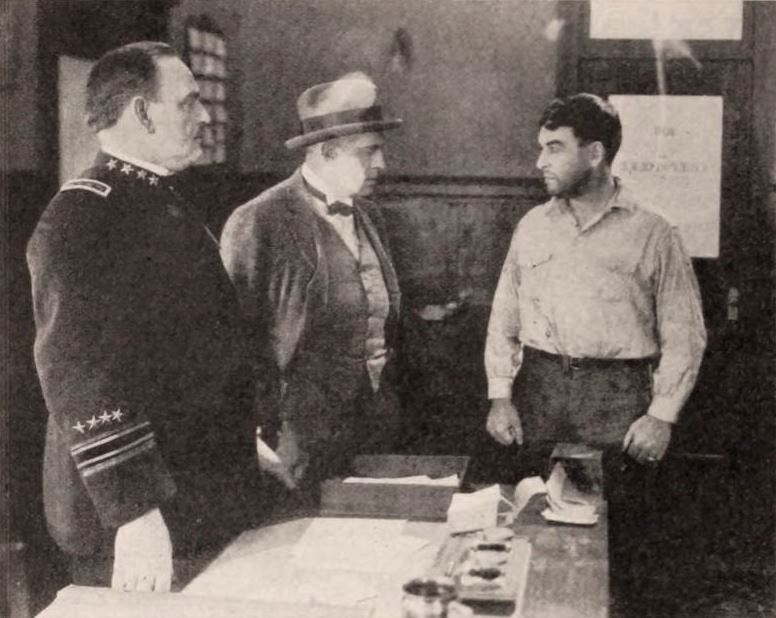
- Directed by: William Duncan
- Written by: C. Graham Baker
- Produced by: Albert E. Smith
- Starring: William Duncan; Edith Johnson; Jack Richardson
- Cinematography: George Robinson
- Production company: Vitagraph Company of America
- Distributed by: Vitagraph Company of America
- Release date: December 25, 1921
- Running time: 60 minutes
- Country: United States
- Languages: Silent; English intertitles

No Defense is a 1921 American silent drama film directed by William Duncan and starring Duncan, Edith Johnson and Jack Richardson.

== Cast ==
- William Duncan as John Manning
- Edith Johnson as Ethel Austin
- Jack Richardson as Frederick Apthorpe
- Henry Hebert as Milton Hulst
- Mathilde Brundage as Mrs. Austin
- Charles Dudley as MacRoberts

== Bibliography ==
- Rainey, Buck. Sweethearts of the Sage: Biographies and Filmographies of 258 actresses appearing in Western movies. McFarland & Company, 1992.
